= List of French Indoor Athletics Championships winners =

This list includes French Indoor Athletics Championships winners.

== Men ==
=== 50 metres ===
- 1972: Michel Limousin
- 1973–1977: not held
- 1978: Gilles Echevin
- 1979–1980: not held
- 1981: Marc Gasparoni

=== 60 metres ===
- 1964: Claude Piquemal
- 1965: Jacquie Bernard
- 1966: Claude Piquemal, Jacquie Bernard
- 1967: Jocelyn Delecour
- 1968: not held
- 1969: Alain Vermuse
- 1970: not held
- 1971: Alain Sarteur
- 1972: not held
- 1973: Alain Sarteur
- 1974: Dominique Chauvelot
- 1975: Alain Sarteur
- 1976: Bernard Petitbois
- 1977: Gabriel Leroy
- 1978: not held
- 1979: Gilles Echevin
- 1980: Gilles Echevin
- 1981: not held
- 1982: Antoine Richard
- 1983: Antoine Richard
- 1984: Antoine Richard
- 1985: Antoine Richard
- 1986: Antoine Richard
- 1987: Bruno Marie-Rose
- 1988: Daniel Darien
- 1989: Bruno Marie-Rose
- 1990: Bruno Marie-Rose
- 1991: Olivier Théophile
- 1992: Daniel Sangouma
- 1993: Olivier Théophile
- 1994: Laurent Nevo
- 1995: Sébastien Carrat
- 1996: Stéphane Cali
- 1997: Stéphane Cali
- 1998: Alex Menal
- 1999: Vincent Caure
- 2000: Stéphane Cali
- 2001: Stéphane Cali
- 2002: Lueyi Dovy
- 2003: Fabrice Caligny
- 2004: Lueyi Dovy
- 2005: Ronald Pognon
- 2006: Ronald Pognon
- 2007: Ronald Pognon
- 2008: Martial Mbandjock
- 2009: Emmanuel Ngom Priso
- 2010: Christophe Lemaitre
- 2011: Christophe Lemaitre
- 2012: Christophe Lemaitre
- 2013: Jimmy Vicaut
- 2014: Christophe Lemaitre
- 2015: Christophe Lemaitre
- 2016: Christophe Lemaitre
- 2017: Christophe Lemaitre
- 2018: Marvin René
- 2019: Marvin René
- 2020: Marvin René
- 2021: Mouhamadou Fall
- 2022: Jimmy Vicaut
- 2023: Jeff Erius
- 2024: Jeff Erius
- 2025: Antoine Thoraval

=== 100 metres ===
- 1968: Jocelyn Delecour
- 1969: not held
- 1970: Alain Sarteur

=== 200 metres ===
- 1982: Joseph Arame
- 1983: Aldo Canti
- 1984: Patrick Barré
- 1985: Pascal Barré
- 1986: Bruno Marie-Rose
- 1987: Bruno Marie-Rose
- 1988: Daniel Sangouma
- 1989: Alain Mazella
- 1990: Gilles Quénéhervé
- 1991: Eric Perrot
- 1992: Daniel Sangouma
- 1993: Stéphane Diagana
- 1994: Daniel Sangouma
- 1995: Marc Foucan
- 1996: Christophe Cheval
- 1997: Christophe Cheval
- 1998: Marc Foucan
- 1999: Marc Foucan
- 2000: Christophe Cheval
- 2001: Joshua Gnoan
- 2002: Leslie Djhone
- 2003: Leslie Djhone
- 2004: Leslie Djhone
- 2005: Idrissa M'Barke
- 2006: not held
- 2007: Idrissa M'Barke
- 2008: Antony Couffe
- 2009: Antony Couffe
- 2010: Imaad Hallay
- 2011: Guy-Elphège Anouman
- 2012: Yannick Fonsat
- 2013: Pierre Vincent
- 2014: Jeffrey John
- 2015: Pierre-Alexis Pessonneaux
- 2016: Christophe Lemaitre
- 2017: Jeffrey John
- 2018: Meba-Mickael Zeze
- 2019: Stuart Dutamby
- 2020: Amaury Golitin
- 2021: Loïc Prévot
- 2022: Ryan Zeze
- 2023: Hachim Maaroufou
- 2024: Hachim Maaroufou
- 2025: Hugo Cerra

=== 300 metres ===
- 1966: Claude Piquemal
- 1967: Jean-Claude Nallet
- 1968: Bernard Devillon
- 1969: Jean-Claude Nallet
- 1970: Gilles Bertould
- 1971: Charles Ducasse

=== 400 metres ===
- 1964: Christian Deloffre
- 1965: Pierre Gaudry
- 1966: Gilbert Iundt
- 1967: Jean-Claude Nallet
- 1968: Jacques Carette, Jean-Pierre Boccardo
- 1969: Bernard Devillon
- 1970: Jean-Paul Barriau, Lionel Malingre
- 1971: Lionel Malingre
- 1972: Michel Dach
- 1973: Francis Kerbiriou
- 1974: Francis Demarthon
- 1975: Francis Kerbiriou
- 1976: Christian Jakiel
- 1977: Hector Llatser
- 1978: Gérard Boutier
- 1979: Maurice Volmar
- 1980: Pascal Barré
- 1981: Paul Bourdin
- 1982: Jacques Fellice
- 1983: Jean-Jacques Février
- 1984: Didier Dubois
- 1985: Didier Chlasta
- 1986: Olivier Gui
- 1987: Pascal Vinet
- 1988: Thierry Diagana
- 1989: Aldo Canti
- 1990: Olivier Noirot
- 1991: Christophe Goris
- 1992: Jean-Louis Rapnouil
- 1993: Olivier Noirot
- 1994: Pierre-Marie Hilaire
- 1995: Jacques Farraudière
- 1996: Pierre-Marie Hilaire
- 1997: Fred Mango
- 1998: Bruno Wavelet
- 1999: Fred Mango
- 2000: Marc Raquil
- 2001: Pierre-Marie Hilaire
- 2002: Marc Foucan
- 2003: Fabrice Zircon
- 2004: Brice Panel
- 2005: Leslie Djhone
- 2006: Brice Panel
- 2007: Fadil Bellaabouss
- 2008: Yoann Décimus
- 2009: Leslie Djhone
- 2010: Leslie Djhone
- 2011: Leslie Djhone
- 2012: Jonathan Vilaine
- 2013: Mamoudou Hanne
- 2014: Angel Chelala
- 2015: Toumany Coulibaly
- 2016: Angel Chelala
- 2017: Thomas Jordier
- 2018: Thomas Jordier
- 2019: Fabrisio Saidy
- 2020: Lorenzo Ricque
- 2021: Thomas Jordier
- 2022: Clément Ducos
- 2023: Gilles Biron
- 2024: Thomas Jordier
- 2025: Jimy Soudril

=== 800 metres ===
- 1964: Gilbert Iundt
- 1965: Gérard Vervoort
- 1966: Maurice Lurot
- 1967: Jean-Pierre Dufresne
- 1968: Gilles Sibon
- 1969: Pierre Toussaint
- 1970: Michel Samper
- 1971: Philippe Meyer
- 1972: Francis Gonzalez
- 1973: Francis Gonzalez
- 1974: Philippe Meyer
- 1975: Gérard Delaire
- 1976: Francis Gonzalez
- 1977: Eric Charron
- 1978: Roger Milhau
- 1979: Roger Milhau
- 1980: Pascal Mille
- 1981: Bruno Tabourin
- 1982: Roger Milhau
- 1983: Didier Le Guillou
- 1984: Thierry Tonnelier
- 1985: Thierry Tonnelier
- 1986: André Lavie
- 1987: Didier Le Guillou
- 1988: André Lavie
- 1989: Claude Diomar
- 1990: Yves Gardes
- 1991: Vincent Terrier
- 1992: Thierry Caquelard
- 1993: Frédéric Sille
- 1994: Bruno Konczylo
- 1995: Jean-Christophe Vialette
- 1996: Jean-Christophe Vialette
- 1997: Ousmane Diarra
- 1998: Nadir Bosch
- 1999: Jimmy Jean-Joseph
- 2000: David Divad
- 2001: Florent Lacasse
- 2002: Nicolas Aissat
- 2003: Nicolas Aissat
- 2004: Florent Lacasse
- 2005: Nicolas Aissat
- 2006: Antoine Martiak
- 2007: Florent Lacasse
- 2008: Jamale Aarrass
- 2009: Jamale Aarrass
- 2010: Kevin Hautcoeur
- 2011: Jeff Lastenet
- 2012: Ismael Kone
- 2013: Brice Leroy
- 2014: Paul Renaudie
- 2015: Brice Leroy
- 2016: Dimitri Pasquereau
- 2017: Clément Dhainault
- 2018: Clément Dhainault
- 2019: Nasredine Khatir
- 2020: Maxence Bruyas
- 2021: Benjamin Robert
- 2022: Benjamin Robert
- 2023: Benjamin Robert
- 2024: Benjamin Robert
- 2025: Louey Ouerrat

=== 1500 metres ===
- 1965: Michel Jazy
- 1966: Michel Jazy
- 1967: Pierre Toussaint
- 1968: Pierre Viaux
- 1969: Marcel Cavatz
- 1970: Pierre Toussaint
- 1971: Pierre Toussaint
- 1972: Jacky Boxberger
- 1973: Jacky Boxberger
- 1974: Jean-Louis Benoit
- 1975: Francis Gonzalez
- 1976: Jean-Louis Benoit
- 1977: Francis Gonzalez
- 1978: Francis Gonzalez
- 1979: Laurent Rutton
- 1980: Didier Begouin
- 1981: Francis Bentz
- 1982: François Burdel
- 1983: Bruno Tabourin
- 1984: Dominique Bouchard
- 1985: Raymond Pannier
- 1986: Pascal Clouvel
- 1987: Yvan Perré
- 1988: Jacky Carlier
- 1989: Hervé Phelippeau
- 1990: Eric Dubus
- 1991: Pascal Thiebaut
- 1992: Christophe Lemonnier
- 1993: Mickaël Damian
- 1994: Mickaël Damian
- 1995: Abdelkader Chekhemani
- 1996: Pascal Blanc
- 1997: Nadir Bosch
- 1998: Bouabdellah Tahri
- 1999: Mickaël Damian
- 2000: Mehdi Baala
- 2001: Alexi Abraham
- 2002: Alexi Abraham
- 2003: Driss Maazouzi
- 2004: Mounir Yemmouni
- 2005: Mokhtar Benhari
- 2006: Mounir Yemmouni
- 2007: Abdelkader Bakhtache
- 2008: Guillaume Eraud
- 2009: Guillaume Eraud
- 2010: Abdelkader Bakhtache
- 2011: Jamale Aarrass
- 2012: Bryan Cantero
- 2013: Simon Denissel
- 2014: Yoann Kowal
- 2015: Bryan Cantero
- 2016: Alexandre Saddedine
- 2017: Sofiane Selmouni
- 2018: Samir Dahmani
- 2019: Samir Dahmani
- 2020: Pierrik Jocteur-Monrozier
- 2021: Djilali Bedrani
- 2022: Azeddine Habz
- 2023: Azeddine Habz
- 2024: Azeddine Habz
- 2025: Paul Anselmini

=== 3000 metres ===
- 1964: Michel Jazy
- 1965: Gilbert Gauthier
- 1966: Gilbert Gauthier
- 1967: Gilbert Gauthier
- 1968: Gérard Vervoort
- 1969: Gilbert Gauthier
- 1970: Jean Levaillant
- 1971: Gérard Vervoort
- 1972: Michel Geraudie
- 1973: Gérard Buchheit
- 1974: Jean-Pierre Dufresne
- 1975: Claude Nicolas
- 1976: Jean-Luc Cherrier
- 1977: Alexandre Gonzalez
- 1978: Jean-Claude Rampon
- 1979: Gérard Pajot
- 1980: Philippe Daniel
- 1981: Alexandre Gonzalez
- 1982: Philippe Daniel
- 1983: Didier Bernard
- 1984: Philippe Legrand
- 1985: Philippe Guilbaud
- 1986: Bertrand Itsweire
- 1987: Bruno Levant
- 1988: Jacky Carlier
- 1989: Jacky Carlier
- 1990: Hervé Phelippeau
- 1991: Pascal Thiebaut
- 1992: Eric Dubus
- 1993: Eric Dubus
- 1994: Pascal Thiebaut
- 1995: Jacky Carlier
- 1996: Eric Dubus
- 1997: Saïd Chebili
- 1998: Halel Taguelmint
- 1999: Saïd Chebili
- 2000: Nadir Bosch
- 2001: Bouabdellah Tahri
- 2002: Irba Lakhal
- 2003: Fouzi El Kholti
- 2004: Vincent Le Dauphin
- 2005: Vincent Le Dauphin
- 2006: Vincent Le Dauphin
- 2007: Bouabdellah Tahri
- 2008: Mohamed-Khaled Belabbas
- 2009–2014: not held
- 2015: Hassan Chahdi
- 2016: Guillaume Adam
- 2017: Yann Schrub
- 2018: Simon Denissel
- 2019: Djilali Bedrani
- 2020: Azeddine Habz
- 2021: Hugo Hay
- 2022: Bastien Augusto
- 2023: Bastien Augusto
- 2024: Romain Mornet
- 2025: Azeddine Habz

=== 50 metres hurdles ===
- 1972: Marc Noé
- 1973–1977: not held
- 1978: Thierry Sellier
- 1979–1980: not held
- 1981: Guy Drut

=== 60 metres hurdles ===
- 1964: Marcel Duriez, Bernard Fournet
- 1965: Marcel Duriez, Marcel Duriez
- 1966: Marcel Duriez, Marcel Duriez
- 1967: Patrick Malrieu, Patrick Malrieu
- 1968: not held
- 1969: Pierre Schoebel
- 1970: not held
- 1971: Guy Drut
- 1972: not held
- 1973: Guy Drut
- 1974: Guy Drut
- 1975: Guy Drut
- 1976: Jean-Pierre Corval
- 1977: Emile Raybois
- 1978: not held
- 1979: Emile Raybois
- 1980: Emile Raybois
- 1981: not held
- 1982: Philippe Hatil
- 1983: Philippe Hatil
- 1984: Pascal Boussemart
- 1985: Philippe Aubert
- 1986: Stéphane Caristan
- 1987: Stéphane Caristan
- 1988: Philippe Tourret
- 1989: Philippe Tourret
- 1990: Philippe Tourret
- 1991: Philippe Tourret
- 1992: Sébastien Thibault
- 1993: Dan Philibert
- 1994: Dan Philibert
- 1995: Sébastien Thibault
- 1996: Dan Philibert
- 1997: Philippe Lamine
- 1998: Vincent Clarico
- 1999: Dan Philibert
- 2000: Sébastien Denis
- 2001: Philippe Lamine
- 2002: Ladji Doucouré
- 2003: Cédric Lavanne
- 2004: Ladji Doucouré
- 2005: Ladji Doucouré
- 2006: Cédric Lavanne
- 2007: Cédric Lavanne
- 2008: Samuel Coco-Viloin
- 2009: Ladji Doucouré
- 2010: Ladji Doucouré
- 2011: Dimitri Bascou
- 2012: Pascal Martinot-Lagarde
- 2013: Pascal Martinot-Lagarde
- 2014: Pascal Martinot-Lagarde
- 2015: Dimitri Bascou
- 2016: Pascal Martinot-Lagarde
- 2017: Pascal Martinot-Lagarde
- 2018: Aurel Manga
- 2019: Pascal Martinot-Lagarde
- 2020: Aurel Manga
- 2021: Wilhem Belocian
- 2022: Wilhem Belocian
- 2023: Just Kwaou-Mathey
- 2024: Wilhem Belocian
- 2025: Wilhem Belocian

=== 110 metres hurdles ===
- 1968: Pierre Schoebel
- 1969: not held
- 1970: Guy Drut

=== 300 metres hurdles ===
- 1964: Robert Poirier
- 1965: Claude Pellier
- 1966: Alain Hebrard
- 1967: Gérard Le Bolch
- 1968: Alain Hebrard
- 1969: Bernard Pollet-Villard
- 1970: Jean-Claude Nallet
- 1971: Jean-Pierre Perrot

=== 5000 metres walk ===
- 1978: Gérard Lelièvre
- 1979: Gérard Lelièvre
- 1980: Gérard Lelièvre
- 1981: Gérard Lelièvre
- 1982: Gérard Lelièvre
- 1983: Gérard Lelièvre
- 1984: Gérard Lelièvre
- 1985: Martial Fesselier
- 1986: Martial Fesselier
- 1987: Martial Fesselier
- 1988: Jean-Claude Corre
- 1989: Jean-Claude Corre
- 1990: Martial Fesselier
- 1991: Jean-Olivier Brosseau
- 1992: Jean-Claude Corre
- 1993: Jean-Claude Corre
- 1994: Jean-Claude Corre
- 1995–1996: not held
- 1997: Jean-Claude Corre
- 1998: Pascal Servanty
- 1999: Eddy Riva
- 2000: Eddy Riva
- 2001: Pascal Servanty
- 2002: Pascal Servanty
- 2003: Pascal Servanty
- 2004: Hervé Davaux
- 2005: Denis Langlois
- 2006: Denis Langlois
- 2007: Hervé Davaux
- 2008: Antonin Boyez
- 2009: Yohann Diniz
- 2010: Antonin Boyez
- 2011: Antonin Boyez
- 2012: Antonin Boyez
- 2013: Antonin Boyez
- 2014: Antonin Boyez
- 2015: Antonin Boyez
- 2016: Jean Blancheteau
- 2017: Yohann Diniz
- 2018: David Kuster
- 2019: Gabriel Bordier
- 2020: Gabriel Bordier
- 2021: Aurélien Quinion
- 2022: not held
- 2023: Aurélien Quinion
- 2024: Aurélien Quinion
- 2025: Gabriel Bordier

=== High jump ===
- 1964: Raymond Dugarreau
- 1965: Robert Sainte-Rose
- 1966: Robert Sainte-Rose
- 1967: Henry Elliott
- 1968: Robert Sainte-Rose
- 1969: Henry Elliott
- 1970: Bernard Gauthier
- 1971: Bernard Gauthier
- 1972: Michel Le Goff
- 1973: Jean-Jacques Foucault
- 1974: Henry Elliott
- 1975: Paul Poaniewa
- 1976: Philippe Darras
- 1977: Paul Poaniewa
- 1978: Paul Poaniewa
- 1979: Francis Agbo
- 1980: Bernard Bachorz
- 1981: Ramon Diaz
- 1982: Franck Bonnet
- 1983: Franck Verzy
- 1984: Dominique Hernandez
- 1985: Vincent Gouzalc'h
- 1986: Vincent Gouzalc'h
- 1987: Dany Dhaneus
- 1988: Dominique Hernandez
- 1989: Dominique Hernandez
- 1990: Jean-Charles Gicquel
- 1991: Jean-Charles Gicquel
- 1992: Xavier Robilliard
- 1993: Jean-Charles Gicquel
- 1994: Jean-Charles Gicquel
- 1995: Didier Detchenique
- 1996: Joël Vincent
- 1997: Didier Detchenique
- 1998: Didier Detchenique
- 1999: Didier Detchenique
- 2000: Didier Detchenique
- 2001: Dieudonné Opota
- 2002: Grégory Gabella
- 2003: Grégory Gabella
- 2004: Joan Charmant
- 2005: Mustapha Raifak
- 2006: Mustapha Raifak
- 2007: Mustapha Raifak
- 2008: Abdoulaye Diarra
- 2009: Abdoulaye Diarra
- 2010: Mickael Hanany
- 2011: Fabrice Saint-Jean
- 2012: Mickael Hanany
- 2013: Mickael Hanany
- 2014: Sébastien Deschamps
- 2015: Florian Labourel
- 2016: Abdoulaye Diarra
- 2017: Abdoulaye Diarra
- 2018: Youssef Benzemia
- 2019: Mathieu Tomassi
- 2020: Loïc Gasch
- 2021: Sébastien Micheau
- 2022: Sébastien Micheau
- 2023: Mathieu Tomassi
- 2024: Taylor Minos
- 2025: Moustapha Diane

=== Pole vault ===
- 1964: Maurice Houvion
- 1965: Hervé d'Encausse
- 1966: Hervé d'Encausse
- 1967: Hervé d'Encausse
- 1968: Hervé d'Encausse
- 1969: Hervé d'Encausse
- 1970: François Tracanelli
- 1971: Jean-Michel Bellot, Michel Olivary
- 1972: Jean-Michel Bellot
- 1973: Serge Lefebvre
- 1974: Guy Drut
- 1975: Jean-Michel Bellot
- 1976: Jean-Michel Bellot
- 1977: Jean-Michel Bellot
- 1978: François Tracanelli
- 1979: Patrick Abada
- 1980: Thierry Vigneron
- 1981: Thierry Vigneron
- 1982: Thierry Vigneron
- 1983: Thierry Vigneron
- 1984: Thierry Vigneron
- 1985: Thierry Vigneron
- 1986: Philippe Collet
- 1987: Ferenc Salbert
- 1988: Philippe Collet
- 1989: Jean-Marc Tailhardat
- 1990: Jean Galfione, Jean-Marc Tailhardat
- 1991: Philippe Collet
- 1992: Jean Galfione
- 1993: Jean Galfione
- 1994: Jean Galfione
- 1995: Jean-Michel Godard
- 1996: Jean Galfione
- 1997: Alain Andji
- 1998: Romain Mesnil
- 1999: Jean Galfione
- 2000: Khalid Lachheb
- 2001: Romain Mesnil
- 2002: Romain Mesnil
- 2003: Nicolas Guigon
- 2004: Jérôme Clavier
- 2006: Romain Mesnil
- 2007: Jérôme Clavier
- 2008: Romain Mesnil
- 2009: Romain Mesnil
- 2010: Renaud Lavillenie
- 2011: Renaud Lavillenie
- 2012: Renaud Lavillenie
- 2013: Renaud Lavillenie
- 2014: Kévin Menaldo
- 2015: Renaud Lavillenie
- 2016: Renaud Lavillenie
- 2017: Kévin Menaldo
- 2018: Renaud Lavillenie
- 2019: Axel Chapelle
- 2020: Renaud Lavillenie
- 2021: Valentin Lavillenie
- 2022: Thibaut Collet
- 2023: Alioune Sene
- 2024: Thibaut Collet
- 2025: Thibaut Collet

=== Long jump ===
- 1964: Alain Levèvre
- 1965: Christian Kaddour
- 1966: Jean Cochard
- 1967: Jack Pani
- 1968: Jack Pani
- 1969: André Vix
- 1970: Christian Tourret
- 1971: Jean-François Bonhème
- 1972: Jean-François Bonhème
- 1973: Jacques Rousseau
- 1974: Jean-François Bonhème
- 1975: Jacques Rousseau
- 1976: Jacques Rousseau
- 1977: Gilbert Zante
- 1978: Gilbert Zante
- 1979: Frédéric Charles
- 1980: Frédéric Charles
- 1981: Claude Morinière
- 1982: Denis Pinabel
- 1983: Denis Pinabel
- 1984: Philippe Deroche
- 1985: Claude Morinière
- 1986: Norbert Brige
- 1987: Norbert Brige
- 1988: Claude Morinière
- 1989: Norbert Brige
- 1990: Serge Helan
- 1991: Rudy Verbecke
- 1992: Serge Helan
- 1993: Dany Dhaneus
- 1994: Olivier Borderan
- 1995: Emmanuel Bangué
- 1996: Emmanuel Bangué
- 1997: Emmanuel Bangué
- 1998: Emmanuel Bangué
- 1999: Cheikh Touré
- 2000: Emmanuel Bangué
- 2001: Mickael Loria
- 2002: Kader Klouchi
- 2003: Salim Sdiri
- 2004: Yann Domenech
- 2005: Salim Sdiri
- 2006: Salim Sdiri
- 2007: Kafetien Gomis
- 2008: Kafetien Gomis
- 2009: Kafetien Gomis
- 2010: Salim Sdiri
- 2011: Salim Sdiri
- 2012: Nicolas Gomont
- 2013: Nicolas Gomont
- 2014: Kafetien Gomis
- 2015: Kafetien Gomis
- 2016: Kafetien Gomis
- 2017: Kafetien Gomis
- 2018: Guillaume Victorin
- 2019: Jean-Pierre Bertrand
- 2020: Augustin Bey
- 2021: Jean-Pierre Bertrand
- 2022: Tom Campagne
- 2023: Jean-Pierre Bertrand
- 2024: Erwan Konaté
- 2025: Mathis Vaitulukina

=== Triple jump ===
- 1964: Alain Romarin
- 1965: Alain Luciano
- 1966: Alain Luciano
- 1967: Alain Luciano, Jean-Marie Agnès
- 1968: Serge Firca
- 1969: Alain Rousselin
- 1970: Bertrand Damoiseau
- 1971: Serge Firca
- 1972: André Rota
- 1973: André Rota
- 1974: Christian Valetudie
- 1975: Christian Valetudie
- 1976: Christian Valetudie
- 1977: Christian Valetudie
- 1978: Jean-Hervé Stievenart
- 1979: Patrick Butel
- 1980: Christian Valetudie
- 1981: Henri Dorina
- 1982: Henri Dorina
- 1983: Christian Valetudie
- 1984: Henri Dorina
- 1985: Pierre Camara
- 1986: Serge Helan
- 1987: Serge Helan
- 1988: Serge Helan
- 1989: Serge Helan
- 1990: Serge Helan
- 1991: Garfield Anselm
- 1992: Serge Helan
- 1993: Serge Helan
- 1994: Serge Helan
- 1995: Serge Helan
- 1996: Kenny Boudine
- 1997: Serge Helan
- 1998: Serge Helan
- 1999: Kenny Boudine
- 2000: Colomba Fofana
- 2001: Jimmy Gabriel
- 2002: Karl Taillepierre
- 2003: Karl Taillepierre
- 2004: Julien Kapek
- 2005: Julien Kapek
- 2006: Karl Taillepierre
- 2007: Karl Taillepierre
- 2008: Teddy Tamgho
- 2009: Teddy Tamgho
- 2010: Colomba Fofana
- 2011: Teddy Tamgho
- 2012: Benjamin Compaoré
- 2013: Harold Correa
- 2014: Gaëtan Saku Bafuanga Baya
- 2015: Jean-Marc Pontvianne
- 2016: Teddy Tamgho
- 2017: Jean-Marc Pontvianne
- 2018: Lamou Martin
- 2019: Yoann Rapinier
- 2020: Melvin Raffin
- 2021: Melvin Raffin
- 2022: Melvin Raffin
- 2023: Benjamin Compaoré
- 2024: Jean-Marc Pontvianne
- 2025: Melvin Raffin

=== Shot put ===
- 1964: André Godard
- 1965: Pierre Colnard
- 1966: Pierre Colnard
- 1967: Pierre Colnard
- 1968: Pierre Colnard
- 1969: Arnjolt Beer
- 1970: Arnjolt Beer
- 1971: Pierre Colnard
- 1972: Yves Brouzet
- 1973: Yves Brouzet
- 1974: Yves Brouzet
- 1975: Arnjolt Beer
- 1976: Yves Brouzet
- 1977: Arnjolt Beer
- 1978: Arnjolt Beer
- 1979: Arnjolt Beer
- 1980: Yves Brouzet
- 1981: Luc Viudès
- 1982: Yves Brouzet
- 1983: Jean-Marie Djébaili
- 1984: Luc Viudès
- 1985: Jean-Marie Djébaili
- 1986: Patrick Journoud
- 1987: Aubert Tréguilly
- 1988: Luc Viudès
- 1989: Aubert Tréguilly
- 1990: Luc Viudès
- 1991: Frédéric Selle
- 1992: Luc Viudès
- 1993: Luc Viudès
- 1994: Serge Mouton
- 1995: Jean-Louis Lebon
- 1996: Jean-Louis Lebon
- 1997: Jean-Louis Lebon
- 1998: Jean-Louis Lebon
- 1999: Yves Niaré
- 2000: Stéphane Vial
- 2001: Yves Niaré
- 2002: Yves Niaré
- 2003: Aukustino Hoatau
- 2004: Gaëtan Bucki
- 2005: Gaëtan Bucki
- 2006: Gaëtan Bucki
- 2007: Gaëtan Bucki
- 2008: Stéphane Szuster
- 2009: Yves Niaré
- 2010: Gaëtan Bucki
- 2011: Gaëtan Bucki
- 2012: Tumatai Dauphin
- 2013: Tumatai Dauphin
- 2014: Gaëtan Bucki
- 2015: Tumatai Dauphin
- 2016: Gaëtan Bucki
- 2017: Frédéric Dagée
- 2018: Gaëtan Bucki
- 2019: Frédéric Dagée
- 2020: Frédéric Dagée
- 2021: Frédéric Dagée
- 2022: Frédéric Dagée
- 2023: Stephen Louis Mailagi
- 2024: Frédéric Dagée
- 2025: Franck Elamba Owaka

=== Weight throw ===
- 1977: Jacques Accambray
- 1978: Jacques Accambray
- 1979: Christophe Gros
- 1980: Philippe Suriray
- 1981: Serge Ramat
- 1982: Jacques Accambray
- 1983: Jacques Accambray
- 1984: Walter Ciofani
- 1985: Walter Ciofani
- 1986: Walter Ciofani
- 1987: Walter Ciofani
- 1988: Walter Ciofani
- 1989: Frédéric Kuhn
- 1990: Frédéric Kuhn
- 1991: Frédéric Kuhn
- 1992: Frédéric Kuhn
- 1993: Frédéric Kuhn

=== Pentathlon ===
- 1981: Philippe Bobin
- 1982: Yves Le Roy
- 1983: Frédéric Sacco
- 1984: Patrick Gellens
- 1985: Stéphane Caristan
- 1986: Frédéric Sacco
- 1987: Alain Blondel
- 1988: Christian Plaziat

=== Heptathlon ===
- 1990: Christian Plaziat
- 1991: Christian Plaziat
- 1992: Christian Plaziat
- 1993: Christian Mandrou
- 1994: Christian Plaziat
- 1995: Christian Plaziat
- 1996: Sébastien Levicq
- 1997: Christian Plaziat
- 1998: Sébastien Levicq
- 1999: Wilfrid Boulineau
- 2000: Laurent Hernu
- 2001: Laurent Hernu
- 2002: Laurent Hernu
- 2003: Laurent Hernu
- 2004: Laurent Hernu
- 2005: Laurent Hernu
- 2006: Rudy Bourguignon
- 2007: Rudy Bourguignon
- 2008: Franck Logel
- 2009: Franck Logel
- 2010: Nadir El Fassi
- 2011: Gaël Quérin
- 2012: Bastien Auzeil
- 2013: Jérémy Lelièvre
- 2014: Bastien Auzeil
- 2015: Gaël Quérin
- 2016: Jérémy Lelièvre
- 2017: Maxime Maugein
- 2018: Maxence Pecatte
- 2019: Basile Rolnin
- 2020: Ludovic Besson
- 2021: Jérémy Lelièvre
- 2022: Valentin Charles
- 2023: Makenson Gletty
- 2024: Bastien Auzeil
- 2025: Téo Bastien

=== Octathlon ===
- 1989: Christian Plaziat

== Women ==
=== 50 metres ===
- 1972: Sylviane Telliez
- 1973–1977: not held
- 1978: Annie Alizé
- 1979–1980: not held
- 1981: Laureen Beckles

=== 60 metres ===
- 1964: Danielle Guéneau
- 1965: Claude Bouix
- 1966: Gabrielle Meyer
- 1967: Sylviane Telliez
- 1968: not held
- 1969: Sylviane Telliez
- 1970: not held
- 1971: Sylviane Telliez
- 1972: not held
- 1973: Sylviane Telliez
- 1974: Nadine Goletto
- 1975: Sylviane Telliez
- 1976: Sylviane Telliez
- 1977: Chantal Rega
- 1978: not held
- 1979: Annie Alizé
- 1980: Laureen Beckles
- 1981: not held
- 1982: Marie-Christine Cazier
- 1983: Marie-France Loval
- 1984: Marie-France Loval
- 1985: Marie-France Loval
- 1986: Laurence Bily
- 1987: Laurence Bily
- 1988: Patricia Girard
- 1989: Laurence Bily
- 1990: Patricia Girard
- 1991: Odile Singa
- 1992: Laurence Bily
- 1993: Patricia Girard
- 1994: Odiah Sidibé
- 1995: Patricia Girard
- 1996: Odiah Sidibé
- 1997: Frédérique Bangué
- 1998: Frédérique Bangué
- 1999: Odiah Sidibé
- 2000: Christine Arron
- 2001: Odiah Sidibé
- 2002: Odiah Sidibé
- 2003: Sylviane Felix
- 2004: Christine Arron
- 2005: Christine Arron
- 2006: Christine Arron
- 2007: Sylviane Felix
- 2008: Christine Arron
- 2009: Ayodele Ikuesan
- 2010: Myriam Soumaré
- 2011: Myriam Soumaré
- 2012: Myriam Soumaré
- 2013: Myriam Soumaré
- 2014: Stella Akakpo
- 2015: Céline Distel-Bonnet
- 2016: Carole Zahi
- 2017: Floriane Gnafoua
- 2018: Carole Zahi
- 2019: Nasrane Bacar
- 2020: Cynthia Leduc
- 2021: Cynthia Leduc
- 2022: Mallory Leconte
- 2023: Cynthia Leduc
- 2024: Orlann Oliere
- 2025: Carole Zahi

=== 100 metres ===
- 1968: Sylviane Telliez
- 1969: not held
- 1970: Sylviane Telliez

=== 200 metres ===
- 1982: Chantal Rega
- 1983: Liliane Gaschet
- 1984: Marie-Christine Cazier
- 1985: Marie-Christine Cazier
- 1986: Fabienne Ficher
- 1987: Marie-Christine Cazier
- 1988: Martine Cassin
- 1989: Marie-José Pérec
- 1990: Marie-Christine Cazier
- 1991: Fabienne Ficher
- 1992: Muriel Leroy
- 1993: Maguy Nestoret
- 1994: Fabienne Ficher
- 1995: Fabé Dia
- 1996: Christine Arron
- 1997: Fabienne Ficher
- 1998: Fabienne Ficher
- 1999: Muriel Hurtis
- 2000: Fabé Dia
- 2001: Fabé Dia
- 2002: Muriel Hurtis
- 2003: Muriel Hurtis
- 2004: Fabienne Beret-Martinel
- 2005: Fabé Dia
- 2006: not held
- 2007: Emilie Gaydu
- 2008: Myriam Soumaré
- 2009: Aurélie Kamga
- 2010: Lina Jacques-Sébastien
- 2011: Emilie Gaydu
- 2012: Myriam Soumaré
- 2013: Johanna Danois
- 2014: Deborah Sananes
- 2015: Brigitte Ntiamoah
- 2016: Stella Akakpo
- 2017: Maroussia Paré
- 2018: Amandine Brossier
- 2019: Maroussia Paré
- 2020: Maroussia Paré
- 2021: Estelle Raffai
- 2022: Sokhna Lacoste
- 2023: Maroussia Paré
- 2024: Pamera Losange
- 2025: Iris Caligiuri

=== 300 metres ===
- 1964: Evelyne Lebret
- 1965: Evelyne Lebret
- 1966: Monique Noirot
- 1967: Monique Noirot
- 1968: Sylviane Telliez
- 1969: Colette Besson
- 1970: Sylviane Telliez

=== 400 metres ===
- 1971: Eliane Jacq
- 1972: Colette Besson
- 1973: Nicole Duclos
- 1974: Eliane Jacq
- 1975: Chantal Leclerc
- 1976: Patricia Darbonville
- 1977: Catherine Delachanal
- 1978: Patricia Darbonville
- 1979: Véronique Rosset
- 1980: Marie-Christine Champenois
- 1981: Sophie Malbranque
- 1982: Sylvie Revaux
- 1983: Viviane Couedriau
- 1984: Fabienne Lise
- 1985: Raymonde Naigre
- 1986: Nadine Debois
- 1987: Fabienne Ficher
- 1988: Fabienne Ficher
- 1989: Fabienne Ficher
- 1990: Ketty Regent-Talbot
- 1991: Viviane Dorsile
- 1992: Francine Landre
- 1993: Marie-Louise Bevis
- 1994: Viviane Dorsile
- 1995: Sophie Domenech
- 1996: Marie-Louise Bevis
- 1997: Marie-France Opheltes
- 1998: Marie-Louise Bevis
- 1999: Marie-France Opheltes
- 2000: Marie-Louise Bevis
- 2001: Sandra Bourgade
- 2002: Peggy Babin
- 2003: Sandrine Thibaud Kangni
- 2004: Virginie Fouquet
- 2005: Phara Anacharsis
- 2006: Aurore Kassambara
- 2007: Solen Désert
- 2008: Dora Jemaa
- 2009: Thelia Sigere
- 2010: Virginie Michanol
- 2011: Muriel Hurtis
- 2012: Marie Gayot
- 2013: Marie Gayot
- 2014: Estelle Perrossier
- 2015: Marie Gayot
- 2016: Marie Gayot
- 2017: Agnès Raharolahy
- 2018: Deborah Sananes
- 2019: Deborah Sananes
- 2020: Amandine Brossier
- 2021: Amandine Brossier
- 2022: Camille Seri
- 2023: Camille Seri
- 2024: Amandine Brossier
- 2025: Amandine Brossier

=== 600 metres ===
- 1964: Maryvonne Dupureur
- 1965: Evelyne Lebret
- 1966: Evelyne Lebret
- 1967: Maryvonne Dupureur
- 1968: Maryvonne Dupureur
- 1969: Colette Besson
- 1970: Colette Besson

=== 800 metres ===
- 1971: Colette Besson
- 1972: Danielle Verriest
- 1973: Colette Besson
- 1974: Monique Authier
- 1975: Madeleine Thomas
- 1976: Madeleine Thomas
- 1977: Chantal Aubry
- 1978: Chantal Aubry
- 1979: Annie-Marie Jossot
- 1980: Anne-Marie Jossot
- 1981: Bernadette Louis
- 1982: Corinne Guillon
- 1983: Bernadette Louis
- 1984: Nathalie Thoumas
- 1985: Catherine Le Breton
- 1986: Catherine Le Breton
- 1987: Catherine Guerrero
- 1988: Nathalie Thoumas
- 1989: Catherine Guerrero
- 1990: Christine Jaunin
- 1991: Nathalie Thoumas
- 1992: Florence Giolitti
- 1993: Catherine Bailleul
- 1994: Patricia Djaté
- 1995: Patricia Djaté
- 1996: Patricia Djaté
- 1997: Patricia Djaté
- 1998: Virginie Fouquet
- 1999: Patricia Djaté
- 2000: Elisabeth Grouselle
- 2001: Laetitia Valdonado
- 2002: Elisabeth Grouselle
- 2003: Matata Sanogo
- 2004: Laetitia Valdonado
- 2005: Laetitia Valdonado
- 2006: Laetitia Valdonado
- 2007: Élodie Guégan
- 2008: Élodie Guégan
- 2009: Linda Marguet
- 2010: Linda Marguet
- 2011: Linda Marguet
- 2012: Clarisse Moh
- 2013: Lisa Blameble
- 2014: Renelle Lamote
- 2015: Renelle Lamote
- 2016: Lore Hoffmann
- 2017: Imane Boukharta
- 2018: Cynthia Anais
- 2019: Charlotte Pizzo
- 2020: Noelie Yarigo
- 2021: Léna Kandissounon
- 2022: Agnès Raharolahy
- 2023: Charlotte Pizzo
- 2024: Anaïs Bourgoin
- 2025: Clara Liberman

=== 1500 metres ===
- 1971: Yvonne Herisson
- 1972: Monique Baulu
- 1973: Nicole Mory
- 1974: Marie-Françoise Dubois
- 1975: Marie-Françoise Dubois
- 1976: Colette Besson
- 1977: Nicole Charron
- 1978: Marie-Françoise Dubois
- 1979: Martine Bouchonneau
- 1980: Maryline Strady
- 1981: Joëlle De Brouwer
- 1982: Patricia Deneuville
- 1983: Patricia Deneuville
- 1984: Maryline Strady
- 1985: Frédérique Lefebvre
- 1986: Patricia Petitbois
- 1987: Christine Hanon
- 1988: Frédérique Lefebvre
- 1989: Odile Gautier
- 1990: Frédérique Lefebvre
- 1991: Véronique Pongérard
- 1992: Céline Martin
- 1993: Véronique Pongérard
- 1994: Frédérique Quentin
- 1995: Frédérique Quentin
- 1996: Frédérique Quentin
- 1997: Frédérique Quentin
- 1998: Frédérique Quentin
- 1999: Latifa Essarokh
- 2000: Patricia Djaté
- 2001: Latifa Essarokh
- 2002: Aurélie Coulaud
- 2003: Aurélie Coulaud
- 2004: Latifa Essarokh
- 2005: Hind Dehiba-Chahyd
- 2006: Maria Martins
- 2007: Jennifer Gueret-Laperte
- 2008: Claire Navez
- 2009: Maria Martins
- 2010: Fanjanteino Felix
- 2011: Hind Dehiba-Chahyd
- 2012: Claire Navez
- 2013: Claire Perraux
- 2014: Ophélie Claude-Boxberger
- 2015: Claire Perraux
- 2016: Elodie Normand
- 2017: Elodie Normand
- 2018: Elodie Normand
- 2019: Ophélie Claude-Boxberger
- 2020: Emma Oudiou
- 2021: Claire Palou
- 2022: Aurore Fleury
- 2023: Bérénice Cleyet-Merle
- 2024: Agathe Guillemot
- 2025: Agathe Guillemot

=== 3000 metres ===
- 1992: Laurence Vivier
- 1993: Laurence Vivier
- 1994: Laurence Vivier
- 1995: Annette Palluy
- 1996: Blandine Ducret
- 1997: Laurence Duquenoy
- 1998: Zahia Dahmani
- 1999: Yamna Belkacem
- 2000: Fatima Yvelain
- 2001: Meriem Mered
- 2002: Carmen Oliveras
- 2003: Maria Martins
- 2004: Margaret Maury
- 2005: Maria Martins
- 2006: Bouchra Ghezielle
- 2007: Elodie Olivares
- 2008: Elodie Olivares
- 2009–2014: not held
- 2015: Fanny Pruvost
- 2016: Emma Oudiou
- 2017: Elodie Normand
- 2018: Claire Perraux
- 2019: Ophélie Claude-Boxberger
- 2020: Bérénice Fulchiron
- 2021: Alice Finot
- 2022: Margaux Sieracki
- 2023: Alice Finot
- 2024: Alice Finot
- 2025: Sarah Madeleine

=== 50 metres hurdles ===
- 1972: Jacqueline André
- 1973–1977: not held
- 1978: Pascale Grolhier
- 1979–1980: not held
- 1981: Michèle Chardonnet

=== 60 metres hurdles ===
- 1964: Marlène Canguio
- 1965: Françoise Masse
- 1966: Françoise Masse
- 1967: Danielle Guéneau
- 1968–1970: not held
- 1971: Jacqueline André
- 1972: not held
- 1973: Jacqueline André
- 1974: Florence Picaut
- 1975: Chantal Rega
- 1976: Nadine Prévost
- 1977: Nadine Prévost
- 1978: not held
- 1979: Michèle Chardonnet
- 1980: Laurence Lebeau
- 1981: not held
- 1982: Michèle Chardonnet
- 1983: Michèle Chardonnet
- 1984: Laurence Elloy
- 1985: Anne Piquereau
- 1986: Anne Piquereau
- 1987: Anne Piquereau
- 1988: Laurence Elloy
- 1989: Christine Hurtlin
- 1990: Anne Piquereau
- 1991: Monique Éwanjé-Épée
- 1992: Monique Éwanjé-Épée
- 1993: Patricia Girard
- 1994: Patricia Girard
- 1995: Patricia Girard
- 1996: Patricia Girard
- 1997: Patricia Girard
- 1998: Patricia Girard
- 1999: Linda Ferga
- 2000: Patricia Girard
- 2001: Linda Ferga
- 2002: Patricia Girard
- 2003: Patricia Girard
- 2004: Nicole Ramalalanirina
- 2005: Reina-Flor Okori
- 2006: Nicole Ramalalanirina
- 2007: Reina-Flor Okori
- 2008: Reina-Flor Okori
- 2009: Cindy Billaud
- 2010: Alice Decaux
- 2011: Alice Decaux
- 2012: Reina-Flor Okori
- 2013: Reina-Flor Okori
- 2014: Cindy Billaud
- 2015: Sandra Gomis
- 2016: Cindy Billaud
- 2017: Sandra Sogoyou
- 2018: Laura Valette
- 2019: Sacha Alessandrini
- 2020: Cyrena Samba-Mayela
- 2021: Laëticia Bapté
- 2022: Laëticia Bapté
- 2023: Laëticia Bapté
- 2024: Cyrena Samba-Mayela
- 2025: Laëticia Bapté

=== 80 metres hurdles ===
- 1968: Françoise Masse

=== 100 metres hurdles ===
- 1970: Florence Picaut

=== 3000 metres walk ===
- 1983: Suzanne Griesbach
- 1984: Viviane Humbert
- 1985: Suzanne Griesbach
- 1986: Suzanne Griesbach
- 1987: Suzanne Griesbach
- 1988: Suzanne Griesbach
- 1989: Anne-Catherine Berthonnaud
- 1990: Anne-Catherine Berthonnaud
- 1991: Nathalie Marchand
- 1992: Nathalie Marchand
- 1993: Anne-Catherine Berthonnaud
- 1994: Nathalie Fortain
- 1995–1996: not held
- 1997: Anne-Catherine Berthonnaud
- 1998: Nora Leksir
- 1999: Nora Leksir
- 2000: Fatiha Ouali
- 2001: Nora Leksir
- 2002: Fatiha Ouali
- 2003: Fatiha Ouali
- 2004: Patricia Garnier
- 2005: Fatiha Ouali
- 2006: Christine Guinaudeau
- 2007: Christine Guinaudeau
- 2008: Christine Guinaudeau
- 2009: Christine Guinaudeau
- 2010: Christine Guinaudeau
- 2011: Sylwia Korzeniowska
- 2012: Sylwia Korzeniowska
- 2013: Émilie Tissot
- 2014: Émilie Tissot
- 2015: Emilie Menuet
- 2016: Enora Trebaul
- 2017: Emilie Menuet
- 2018: Marine Quenehen
- 2019: Clémence Beretta
- 2020: Clémence Beretta
- 2021: Eloise Terrec
- 2022: Camille Moutard
- 2023: Pauline Stey
- 2024: Chloé Le Roch
- 2025: Ana Delahaie

=== High jump ===
- 1964: Geneviève Laureau
- 1965: Monique Parenty
- 1966: Geneviève Laureau
- 1967: Geneviève Laureau
- 1968: Ghislaine Barnay
- 1969: Evelyne Constans
- 1970: Ghislaine Barnay
- 1971: Evelyne Constans
- 1972: Monique Horrent
- 1973: Monique Horrent
- 1974: Gloria Borfiga
- 1975: Marie-Christine Debourse
- 1976: Marie-Christine Debourse
- 1977: Sylvie Prenveille
- 1978: Sylvie Prenveille
- 1979: Sylvie Prenveille
- 1980: Sophie Leruste
- 1981: Brigitte Rougeron
- 1982: Maryse Éwanjé-Épée
- 1983: Maryse Éwanjé-Épée
- 1984: Maryse Éwanjé-Épée
- 1985: Brigitte Rougeron
- 1986: Maryse Éwanjé-Épée
- 1987: Madely Beaugendre
- 1988: Madely Beaugendre
- 1989: Maryse Éwanjé-Épée
- 1990: Maryse Éwanjé-Épée
- 1991: Barbara Mencik
- 1992: Sandrine Fricot
- 1993: Sandrine Fricot
- 1994: Maryse Maury
- 1995: Katell Courgeon
- 1996: Maryse Maury
- 1997: Marie Collonvillé
- 1998: Sandrine Fricot
- 1999: Marie Collonvillé
- 2000: Gaëlle Niaré
- 2001: Christelle Préau
- 2002: Guilaine Graw
- 2003: Gaëlle Niaré
- 2004: Lucie Finez
- 2005: Melanie Skotnik
- 2006: Anne-Gaël Jardin
- 2007: Melanie Skotnik
- 2008: Sandrine Champion
- 2009: Marie Collonvillé
- 2010: Mélanie Melfort
- 2011: Mélanie Melfort
- 2012: Mélanie Melfort
- 2013: Mélanie Melfort
- 2014: Nawal Meniker
- 2015: Nawal Meniker
- 2016: Marine Vallet
- 2017: Marine Vallet
- 2018: Marine Vallet
- 2019: Prisca Duvernay
- 2020: Claire Orcel
- 2021: Solène Gicquel
- 2022: Juliette Perez
- 2023: Solène Gicquel
- 2024: Solène Gicquel
- 2025: Solène Gicquel

=== Pole vault ===
- 1995: Catherine Oberson
- 1996: Caroline Ammel
- 1997: Amandine Homo
- 1998: Pascale Bourguignon
- 1999: Vanessa Boslak
- 2000: Amandine Homo
- 2001: Vanessa Boslak
- 2002: Agnès Livebardon
- 2003: Vanessa Boslak
- 2004: Vanessa Boslak
- 2005: Vanessa Boslak
- 2006: Vanessa Boslak
- 2007: Vanessa Boslak
- 2008: Vanessa Boslak
- 2009: Elisabete Ribeiro Ansel
- 2010: Marion Buisson
- 2011: Marion Lotout
- 2012: Vanessa Boslak
- 2013: Marion Lotout
- 2014: Marion Lotout
- 2015: Marion Fiack
- 2016: Vanessa Boslak
- 2017: Maria Leonor Tavares
- 2018: Ninon Guillon-Romarin
- 2019: Ninon Guillon-Romarin
- 2020: Ninon Guillon-Romarin
- 2021: Elina Giallurachis
- 2022: Margot Chevrier
- 2023: Margot Chevrier
- 2024: Margot Chevrier
- 2025: Marie-Julie Bonnin

=== Long jump ===
- 1964: Ginette Gradel
- 1965: Claude Bouix
- 1966: Marlène Canguio
- 1967: Claude Bouix
- 1968: Anne-Marie Grosse
- 1969: Odette Ducas
- 1970: Odette Ducas
- 1971: Odette Ducas
- 1972: Marie-Pascale Guillet
- 1973: Jacqueline Curtet
- 1974: Danièle Desmier
- 1975: Marie-Annette Leduc
- 1976: Jacqueline Curtet
- 1977: Jacqueline Curtet
- 1978: Jacqueline Curtet
- 1979: Jacqueline Curtet
- 1980: Sylvie Tarlin
- 1981: Jacqueline Frechet
- 1982: Marie-Odile Massard
- 1983: Brigitte Hardel
- 1984: Marie-Odile Legrand
- 1985: Nadine Fourcade
- 1986: Nadine Fourcade
- 1987: Caroline Missoudan
- 1988: Muriel Leroy
- 1989: Muriel Leroy
- 1990: Françoise Cochard
- 1991: Marie-Victoire Preira
- 1992: Corinne Hérigault
- 1993: Sylvie Borda
- 1994: Corinne Hérigault
- 1995: Sarah Gautreau
- 1996: Linda Ferga
- 1997: Corinne Hérigault
- 1998: Linda Ferga
- 1999: Eunice Barber
- 2000: Marie-Noëlle Faulon
- 2001: Aurélie Felix
- 2002: Aurélie Felix
- 2003: Déborah Grapotte
- 2004: Élysée Vesanes
- 2005: Élysée Vesanes
- 2006: Céline Laporte
- 2007: Élysée Vesanes
- 2008: Marie Collonvillé
- 2009: Haoua Kessely
- 2010: Vanessa Gladone
- 2011: Haoua Kessely
- 2012: Haoua Kessely
- 2013: Éloyse Lesueur
- 2014: Cynthia Bizet
- 2015: Haoua Kessely
- 2016: Haoua Kessely
- 2017: Haoua Kessely
- 2018: Éloyse Lesueur-Aymonin
- 2019: Hilary Kpatcha
- 2020: Éloyse Lesueur-Aymonin
- 2021: Hilary Kpatcha
- 2022: Maelly Dalmat
- 2023: Tiphaine Mauchant
- 2024: Angelica Berriot
- 2025: Angelica Berriot

=== Triple jump ===
- 1991: Nathalie Prévot
- 1992: Sylvie Borda
- 1993: Sylvie Borda
- 1994: Valérie Guiyoule
- 1995: Valérie Guiyoule
- 1996: Sylvie Borda
- 1997: Betty Lise
- 1998: Sylvie Borda
- 1999: Betty Lise
- 2000: Marie-Véronique Mazarin
- 2001: Roseline Retel
- 2002: Amy Zongo
- 2003: Teresa Nzola Meso
- 2004: Teresa Nzola Meso
- 2005: Teresa Nzola Meso
- 2006: Teresa Nzola Meso
- 2007: Teresa Nzola Meso
- 2008: Teresa Nzola Meso
- 2009: Teresa Nzola Meso
- 2010: Teresa Nzola Meso
- 2011: Haoua Kessely
- 2012: Nathalie Marie-Nely
- 2013: Nathalie Marie-Nely
- 2014: Jeanine Assani-Issouf
- 2015: Jeanine Assani-Issouf
- 2016: Jeanine Assani-Issouf
- 2017: Jeanine Assani-Issouf
- 2018: Ilionis Guillaume
- 2019: Rouguy Diallo
- 2020: Anne-Suzanna Fosther-Katta
- 2021: Rouguy Diallo
- 2022: Victoria Josse
- 2023: Ilionis Guillaume
- 2024: Ilionis Guillaume
- 2025: Ilionis Guillaume

=== Shot put ===
- 1964: Josiane Bordellier
- 1965: Josiane Bordellier
- 1966: Claudie Cuvelier
- 1967: Claudie Cuvelier
- 1968: Claudie Cuvelier
- 1969: Claudie Cuvelier
- 1970: Marie-Louise Parguel
- 1971: Marie-Louise Parguel
- 1972: Simone Creantor
- 1973: Léone Bertimon
- 1974: Léone Bertimon
- 1975: Simone Creantor
- 1976: Léone Bertimon
- 1977: Simone Creantor
- 1978: Léone Bertimon
- 1979: Simone Creantor
- 1980: Léone Bertimon
- 1981: Léone Bertimon
- 1982: Léone Bertimon
- 1983: Simone Creantor
- 1984: Simone Creantor
- 1985: Simone Creantor
- 1986: Simone Creantor
- 1987: Léone Bertimon
- 1988: Léone Bertimon
- 1989: Martine Jean-Michel
- 1990: Annick Maurice
- 1991: Annick Lefebvre
- 1992: Annick Lefebvre
- 1993: Fabienne Locuty
- 1994: Annick Lefebvre
- 1995: Annick Lefebvre
- 1996: Laurence Manfredi
- 1997: Laurence Manfredi
- 1998: Laurence Manfredi
- 1999: Laurence Manfredi
- 2000: Laurence Manfredi
- 2001: Laurence Manfredi
- 2002: Laurence Manfredi
- 2003: Laurence Manfredi
- 2004: Laurence Manfredi
- 2005: Laurence Manfredi
- 2006: Laurence Manfredi
- 2007: Laurence Manfredi
- 2008: Kelly Closse
- 2009: Laurence Manfredi
- 2010: Laurence Manfredi
- 2011: Jessica Cérival
- 2012: Jessica Cérival
- 2013: Jessica Cérival
- 2014: Jessica Cérival
- 2015: Jessica Cérival
- 2016: Jessica Cérival
- 2017: Jessica Cérival
- 2018: Jessica Cérival
- 2019: Ashley Bologna
- 2020: Jessica Cérival
- 2021: Amanda Ngandu-Ntumba
- 2022: Amanda Ngandu-Ntumba
- 2023: Amanda Ngandu-Ntumba
- 2024: Amanda Ngandu-Ntumba
- 2025: Christine Gavarin

=== Triathlon ===
- 1981: Christine Da Lage
- 1982: Florence Picaut
- 1983: Viviane Antibe
- 1984: Sylvie Levecq

=== Pentathlon ===
- 1985: Sylvie Levecq
- 1986: Nadine Debois
- 1987: Nadine Debois
- 1988: Valérie Tasiemski
- 1989: Odile Lesage
- 1990: Odile Lesage
- 1991: Odile Lesage
- 1992: Sonia Del Prete
- 1993: Valérie Tasiemski
- 1994: Odile Lesage
- 1995: Guilaine Belperin
- 1996: Marie Collonvillé
- 1997: Anne-Sophie Devillier
- 1998: Guilaine Graw
- 1999: Marie Collonvillé
- 2000: Muriel Crozet
- 2001: Sophie Marot
- 2002: Nathalie Teppe
- 2003: Marie Collonvillé
- 2004: Marie Collonvillé
- 2005: Antoinette Nana Djimou
- 2006: Marie Collonvillé
- 2007: Antoinette Nana Djimou
- 2008: Blandine Maisonnier
- 2009: Antoinette Nana Djimou
- 2010: Antoinette Nana Djimou
- 2011: Blandine Maisonnier
- 2012: Blandine Maisonnier
- 2013: Anaelle Nyabeu Djapa
- 2014: Anaelle Nyabeu Djapa
- 2015: Anaelle Nyabeu Djapa
- 2016: Anaelle Nyabeu Djapa
- 2017: Laura Arteil
- 2018: Esther Turpin
- 2019: Solène Ndama
- 2020: Anaelle Nyabeu Djapa
- 2021: Célia Perron
- 2022: Léonie Cambours
- 2023: Léonie Cambours
- 2024: Odile Ahouanwanou
- 2025: Célia Perron

== See also ==
- List of French Athletics Championships winners (men)
- List of French Athletics Championships winners (women)

== External sources ==
- List of French Athletics Championships winners on the Fédération française d'athlétisme's website
- List of French Indoor Athletics Championships winners (1972—2006) on www.gbrathletics.com
