= Mounir Akbache =

French middle-distance runner (born 1999)

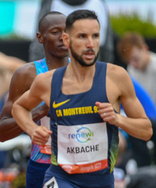
- Akbache pacing the 2022 FBK Games 1500 m

Personal information
- Nationality: France
- Born: 14 March 1986 (age 40)
- Education: Institut national des sciences appliquées de Lyon

Sport
- Sport: Athletics
- Events: 1500 metres 800 metres
- Club: Club Athlétique de Montreuil 93

Achievements and titles
- National finals: 2013 French Indoors; • 800m, 7th; 2014 French Indoors; • 800m, 5th; 2014 French Champs; • 1500m, 13th; 2015 French Indoors; • 1500m, 4th; 2015 French Champs; • 1500m, 9th
- Personal bests: 1500m: 3:39.81 (2014) 800m: 1:49.55 (2021)
- Updated on 6 April 2024

Mounir Akbache (born 14 March 1986) is a French middle-distance runner. After achieving modest success on the national level, he became a pacemaker (also known as a rabbit) for the Diamond League. As a rabbit, Akbache has paced several middle-distance world records in athletics, including for the indoor 3000 metres and outdoor 2000 metres.

== Athletics career ==
Akbache's individual career started as early as 2006, and he raced at several French Athletics Championships with a best placing of 4th at the 2015 indoor edition in the 1500 metres. Despite national-level successes, he was not able to qualify for the highest level of international competition, so he became a pacemaker.

== Pacing career ==
Akbache paced his first world record at the 2023 Meeting Hauts-de-France Pas-de-Calais, leading Lamecha Girma to break a 25-year-old record in the indoor 3000 metres. Speaking in French after the race, Akbache said, "I could feel that [Girma] was hyper-confident. He'd done some crazy sessions in training, he knew he had the world record in his legs".

Akbache is one of Jakob Ingebrigtsen's favorite pacemakers, helping Ingebrigtsen break the 2000 metres world record at the 2023 Memorial Van Damme. At the 2023 Bislett Games, Akbache paced Ingebrigtsen through the first lap in 55.47 seconds, leading Track & Field News to state "the pacing couldn't have been better". Ingebrigtsen would set a best of 3:27.95 in that race, a national record.

== Personal life ==
Akbache is a member of the Club athlétique de Montreuil 93 athletics club in France. He studied at the Institut national des sciences appliquées de Lyon, and he is also an engineer at the Roads Testing and Materials Department for the Centre Expérimental de Recherches et d'Etudes du Bâtiment et des Travaux Publics.

== Statistics ==
=== Personal best progression ===
1500m progression
#	Mark	Pl.	Competition	Venue	Date	Ref.
1	3:52.97	6th (Heat 1-22)	French U23 Championships	Vénissieux, France	19 July 2008	
2	3:47.54	3rd place, bronze medalist(s)		Villefranche-sur-Saone, France	25 June 2010	
3	3:47.37	5th		Chassieu, France	10 June 2011	
4	3:47.28	7th	Meeting National D1 de Besançon	Besançon, France	13 June 2011	
5	3:46.49	8th (Round B)	Meeting National D1 de Metz Moselle Athlelor	Metz, France	26 June 2011	
6	3:44.69	7th	Memorial Leon Buyle, Putbosstadion, Lede-Oordegem	Oordegem, Belgium	1 July 2011	
7	3:42.83	5th (Round B)	Memorial Gert Rasschaert	Ninove, Belgium	20 July 2012	
8	3:42.62	11th	Meeting National de Montbéliard	Montbéliard, France	5 June 2014	
9	3:41.76	7th	Meeting National d'Amiens	Amiens, France	20 June 2014	
10	3:39.81	10th	Meeting Pro Athlé Tour de Montreuil	Montreuil, Seine-Saint-Denis, France	6 July 2014	
