= 2013 French Indoor Athletics Championships =

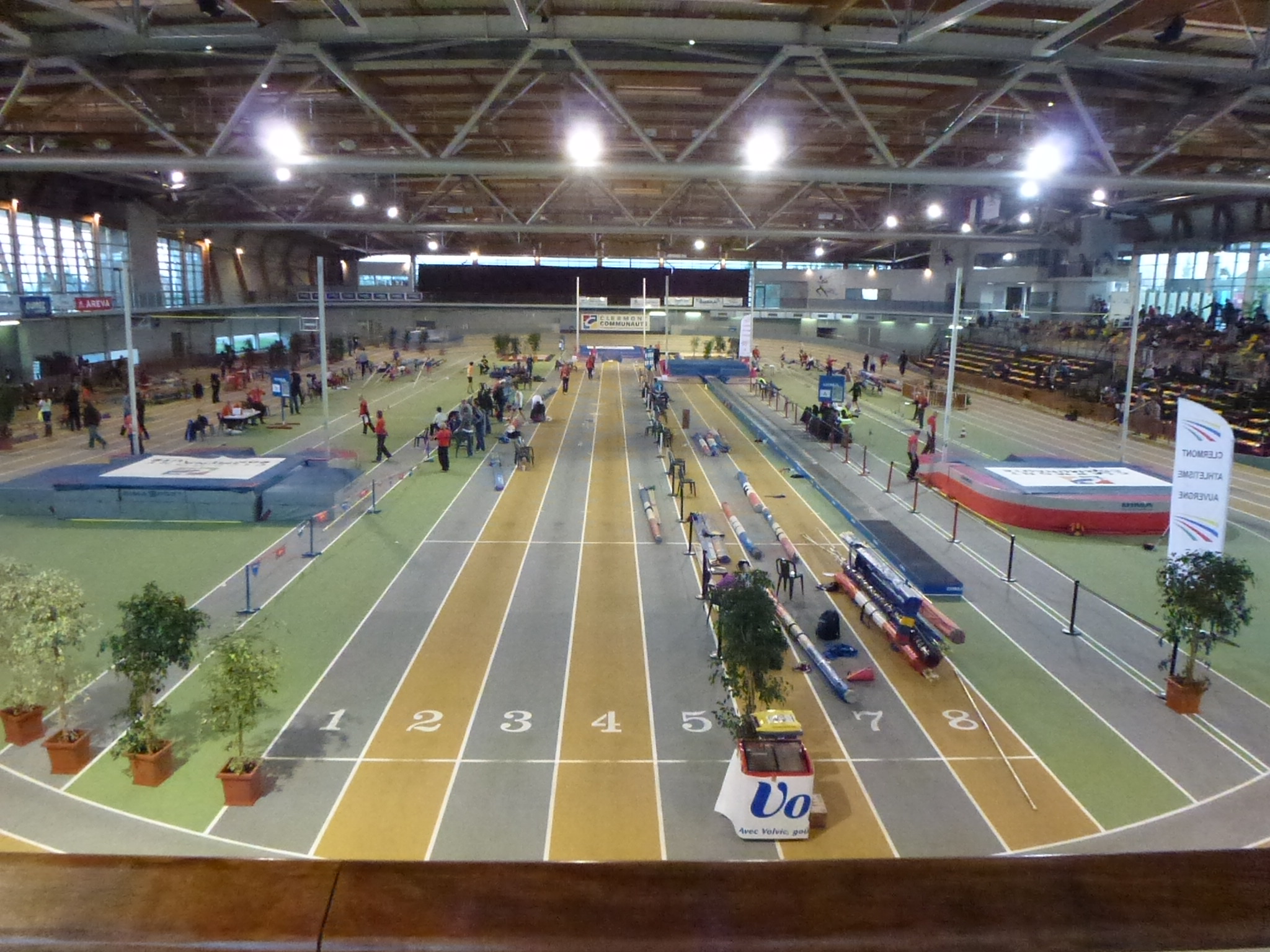
- The host stadium
- Dates: 16–17 February
- Host city: Aubière
- Venue: Jean-Pellez Stadium
- Events: 26

The 2013 French Indoor Athletics Championships was the 42nd edition of the national championship in indoor track and field for France, organised by the French Athletics Federation. It was held on 16–17 February at the Jean-Pellez Stadium in Aubière. A total of 26 events (divided evenly between the sexes) were contested over the two-day competition.

== Results ==
=== Men ===
Event	Gold		Silver		Bronze	
60 metres	Jimmy Vicaut	6.53	Emmanuel Biron	6.63	Christophe Lemaitre	6.69
200 metres	Pierre Vincent	21.17	Teddy Tinmar	21.23	Pierre-Alexis Pessonneaux	21.29
400 metres	Mamoudou Hanne	46.79	Thomas Jordier	46.89	Mame-Ibra Anne	46.91
800 metres	Brice Leroy	1:49.26	Gaëtan Manceaux	1:49.34	Benjamin Herriau	1:49.55
1500 metres	Simon Denissel	3:38.42	Benjamin Pires	3:43.19	Bryan Cantero	3:44.01
5000 m walk	Antonin Boyez	19:06.16	Djamel Selseldeb	20:52.56	Sébastien Delaunay	21:05.38
60 m hurdles	Pascal Martinot-Lagarde	7.53	Dimitri Bascou	7.56	Thomas Martinot-Lagarde	7.75
High jump	Mickaël Hanany	2.27 m	Abdoulaye Diarra	2.24 m	Fabrice Saint-Jean	2.21 m
Pole vault	Renaud Lavillenie	5.93 m WL	Stanley Joseph	5.62 m	Romain Mesnil	5.62 m
Long jump	Nicolas Gomont	7.89 m	Benjamin Compaoré	7.83 m	Salim Sdiri	7.80 m
Triple jump	Harold Correa	16.94 m	Karl Taillepierre	16.83 m	Benjamin Compaoré	16.65 m
Shot put	Tumatai Dauphin	19.06 m	Gaëtan Bucki	18.85 m	Frédéric Dagée	18.18 m
Heptathlon	Jérémy Lelièvre	5997 pts	Kevin Mayer	5983 pts	Gaël Querin	5973 pts

=== Women ===
Event	Gold		Silver		Bronze	
60 metres	Myriam Soumaré	7.24	Céline Distel-Bonnet	7.31	Jennifer Galais	7.31
200 metres	Johanna Danois	22.81	Émilie Gaydu	23.49	Phara Anacharsis	23.62
400 metres	Marie Gayot	51.98	Agnès Raharolahy	53.25	Estelle Perrossier	54.19
800 metres	Lisa Blamèble	2:04.87	Emeline Bauwe	2:05.39	Ophélie Claude-Boxberger	2:05.90
1500 metres	Claire Perraux	4:24.53	Nathalie Reslinger	4:24.67	Athina Bouakira	4:33.70
3000 m walk	Émilie Tissot	13:15.39	Inès Pastorino	13:20.06	Anne-Gaëlle Retout	13:22.03
60 m hurdles	Reïna-Flor Okori	8.03	Alice Decaux	8.04	Cindy Billaud	8.07
High jump	Mélanie Melfort	1.89 m	Diane Barras Sandrine Champion	1.78 m	Not awarded	
Pole vault	Marion Lotout	4.40 m	Marion Fiack	4.35 m	Maria Leonor Tavares	4.30 m
Long jump	Éloyse Lesueur	6.63 m	Darlène Mazeau	6.25 m	Marine Vialle-Taverne	6.15 m
Triple jump	Nathalie Marie-Nely	13.82 m	Jeanine Assani Issouf	13.23 m	Célia-Christelle M'Boua	13.11 m
Shot put	Jessica Cérival	16.81 m	Fabienne Ngoma	15.59 m	Lucie Catouillart	15.14 m
Pentathlon	Camille Le Joly	3995 pts	Gaëlle Le Foll	3966 pts	Anouk Forafo	3953 pts
