= 2016 French Indoor Athletics Championships =

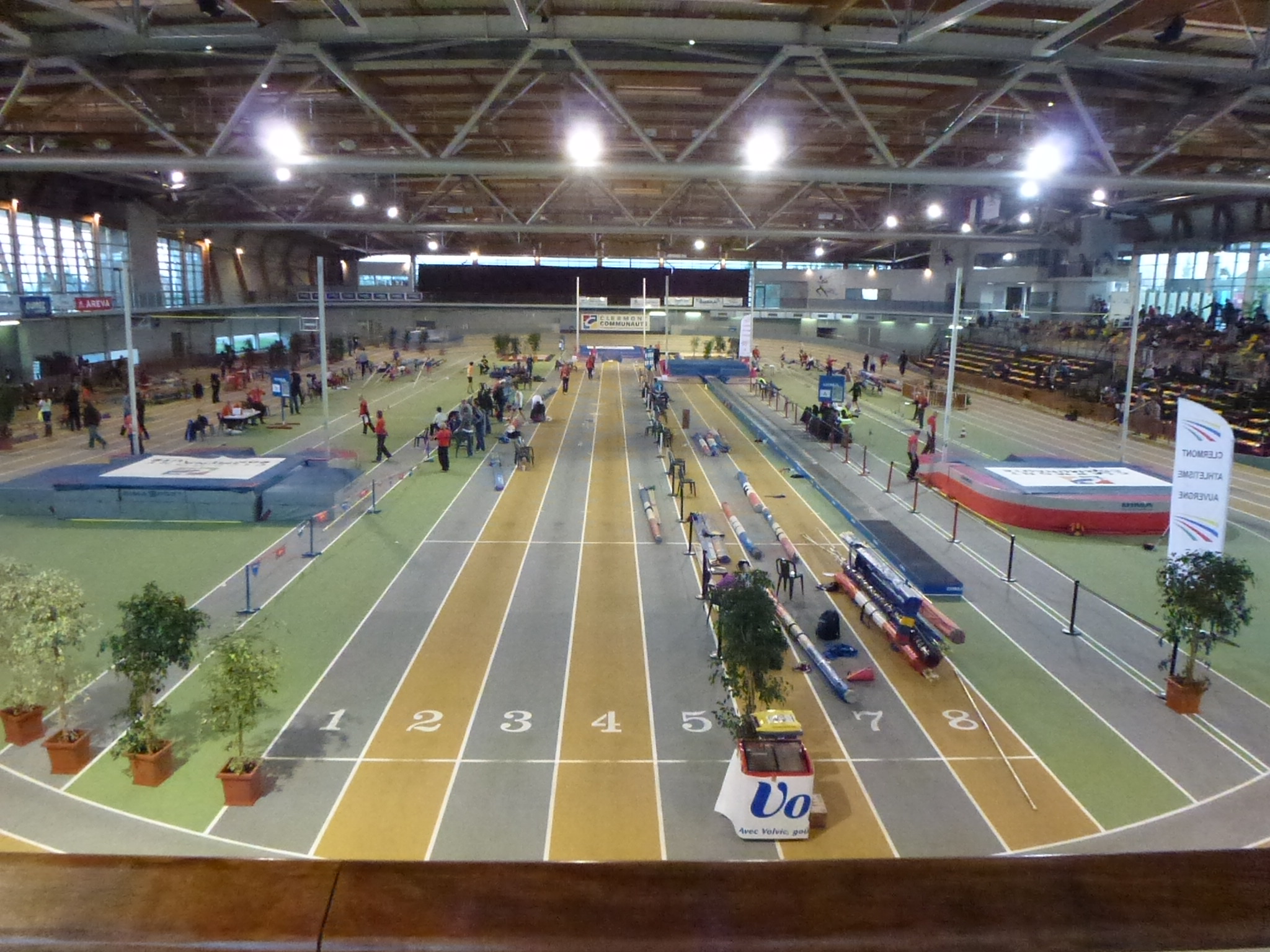
- The host stadium
- Dates: 27–28 February
- Host city: Aubière
- Venue: Jean-Pellez Stadium
- Events: 28

The 2016 French Indoor Athletics Championships was the 45th edition of the national championship in indoor track and field for France, organised by the French Athletics Federation. It was held on 27–28 February at the Jean-Pellez Stadium in Aubière. A total of 28 events (divided evenly between the sexes) were contested over the two-day competition.

== Results ==
=== Men ===
| Event | Gold | | Silver | | Bronze | |
|---|---|---|---|---|---|---|
| 60 metres | Christophe Lemaitre | 6.64 | Christopher Naliali | 6.68 PB | Méba-Mickaël Zeze | 6.73 PB |
| 200 metres | Christophe Lemaitre | 20.43 WLPB | Méba-Mickaël Zeze | 20.54 PB | Pierre-Alexis Pessonneaux | 20.98 |
| 400 metres | Angel Chelala | 47.62 | Patrice Maurice | 47.70 | Yassin Zaoujal | 48.45 |
| 800 metres | Dimitri Pasquereau | 1:48.33 | Renaud Rosière | 1:49.85 | Carl Soudril | 1:49.92 |
| 1500 metres | Alexandre Saddedine | 3:46.76 | Sofiane Selmouni | 3:46.88 | Samir Dahmani | 3:47.17 |
| 3000 metres | Guillaume Adam | 8:07.42 | Djilali Bedrani | 8:07.72 | Florian Théophile | 8:09.51 |
| 5000 m walk | Jean Blancheteau | 19:45.22 | Fabien Bernabe | 20:43.90 | Xavier Le Coz | 20:50.41 |
| 60 m hurdles | Pascal Martinot-Lagarde | 7.47 | Simon Krauss | 7.73 | Thomas Delmestre | 7.74 |
| High jump | Abdoulaye Diarra | 2.21 m | Clément Gicquel | 2.18 m | Fabrice Saint-Jean | 2.14 m |
| Pole vault | Renaud Lavillenie | 5.93 m | Stanley Joseph | 5.63 m PB | Jérôme Clavier | 5.50 m |
| Long jump | Kafétien Gomis | 8.23 m PB | Raihau Maiau | 7.99 m | Salim Sdiri | 7.79 m |
| Triple jump | Teddy Tamgho | 16.98 m | Harold Correa | 16.91 m | Benjamin Compaoré | 16.88 m |
| Shot put | Gaëtan Bucki | 19.30 m | Frédéric Dagée | 19.27 m | Romain Gotteland | 18.51 m PB |
| Heptathlon | Jérémy Lelièvre | 5965 pts | Ruben Gado | 5829 pts | Maxime Maugein | 5811 pts |

=== Women ===
| Event | Gold | | Silver | | Bronze | |
|---|---|---|---|---|---|---|
| 60 metres | Carolle Zahi | 7.18 PB | Jennifer Galais | 7.27 PB | Floriane Gnafoua | 7.31 |
| 200 metres | Stella Akakpo | 23.27 | Élise Trynkler | 23.56 | Caroline Chaillou | 23.89 |
| 400 metres | Marie Gayot | 52.81 | Agnès Raharolahy | 53.20 | Déborah Sananes | 53.89 |
| 800 metres | Lore Hoffman | 2:07.82 | Camille Laplace | 2:07.98 | Athina Bouakira | 2:08.65 |
| 1500 metres | Élodie Normand | 4:26.34 | Johanna Geyer-Carles | 4:27.04 | Aurore Fleury | 4:30.74 |
| 3000 metres | Emma Oudiou | 9:25.51 | Fanny Pruvost | 9:28.12 | Aisse Sow | 9:32.98 |
| 3000 m walk | Enora Trebaul | 13:40.99 | Marine Quennehen | 13:42.54 | Sandra Dupont | 13:57.21 |
| 60 m hurdles | Cindy Billaud | 8.07 | Sandra Gomis | 8.12 | Aisseta Diawara | 8.15 |
| High jump | Marine Vallet | 1.87 m PB | Prisca Duvernay | 1.81 m PB | Solène Gicquel | 1.81 m PB= |
| Pole vault | Vanessa Boslak | 4.60 m | Ninon Guillon-Romarin | 4.35 m | Maria Leonor Tavares | 4.30 m |
| Long jump | Haoua Kessely | 6.42 m | Mathilde Lagarde | 6.07 m | Keshia Willix | 6.07 m |
| Triple jump | Jeanine Assani Issouf | 14.17 m PB | Rouguy Diallo | 14.16 m NJR | Amy Zongo | 13.24 m |
| Shot put | Jessica Cérival | 17.30 m | Rose Sharon Pierre Louis | 16.13 m PB | Antoinette Nana Djimou | 15.28 m |
| Pentathlon | Annaelle Nyabeu Djapa | 4208 pts | Sandra Jacmaire | 4065 pts | Anouk Forafo | 4018 pts |
