= 2022 French Indoor Athletics Championships =

- Edition: 51st
- Dates: 26–27 February
- Host city: Miramas
- Venue: Stadium Miramas Métropole
- Events: 28

The 2022 French Indoor Athletics Championships was the 51st edition of the national championship in indoor track and field for France, organised by the French Athletics Federation. It was held on 26–27 February at the Stadium Miramas Métropole in Miramas. A total of 28 events (divided evenly between the sexes) were contested over the two-day competition.

The finishing times for the men's 5000 m walk were ruled invalid as the competition was ended one lap short, at 4800 m.

== Programme ==
Finals	26 February	27 February
Men	60 m, 3000 m, long jump, shot put	Heptathlon, high jump, pole vault, triple jump, 5000 m walk, 400 m, 800 m, 200 m, 1500 m, 60 m hurdles
Women	60 m, 3000 m, 60 m hurdles, high jump, pole vault, triple jump, shot put	Pentathlon, long jump, 3000 m walk, 800 m, 1500 m, 400 m, 200 m

== Results ==
=== Men ===
Event	Gold		Silver		Bronze	
60 metres	Jimmy Vicaut	6.65	Jeff Erius	6.70	Viktor Contaret	6.71
200 metres	Ryan Zeze	20.99	Hachim Maaroufou	21.20	Paul Tritenne	21.58
400 metres	Clément Ducos	47.27	David Sombé	47.37	Gilles Biron	47.48
800 metres	Benjamin Robert	1:46.89	Gabriel Tual	1:47.35	Clément Dhainaut	1:49.20
1500 metres	Azeddine Habz	3:41.77	Flavien Szot	3:42.02	Benoit Campion	3:43.28
3000 metres	Bastien Augusto	7:59.96	Arthur Gervais	8:00.44	Romain Mornet	8:00.59
5000 m walk	Martin Madeline-Degy	—	Lucas Dreville	—	Alexis Robichon	—
60 m hurdles	Wilhem Belocian	7.53	Pascal Martinot-Lagarde	7.58	Just Kwaou-Mathey	7.72
High jump	Sébastien Micheau	2.18 m	Maxime Dubiez	2.15 m	Matthieu Tomassi	2.15 m
Pole vault	Thibaut Collet	5.81 m	Valentin Lavillenie	5.81 m	Alioune Sène	5.76 m
Long jump	Tom Campagne	7.93 m	Augustin Bey	7.89 m	Yann Randrianasolo	7.60 m
Triple jump	Melvin Raffin	16.76 m	Thomas Gogois	16.63 m	Yoann Rapinier	16.61 m
Shot put	Frédéric Dagée	19.77 m	Itamar Levi	18.50 m	Yann Moisan	18.16 m
Heptathlon	Valentin Charles	5694 pts	Jérémy Lelièvre	5623 pts	Basile Rolnin	5470 pts

=== Women ===
Event	Gold		Silver		Bronze	
60 metres	Mallory Leconte	7.34	Gémima Joseph	7.37	Chloé Galet	7.44
200 metres	Sokhna Lacoste	23.40	Brigitte Ntiamoah	23.63	Chloé Galet	23.90
400 metres	Camille Séri	53.15	Amandine Brossier	53.40	Laurine Xailly	53.86
800 metres	Agnès Raharolahy	2:03.93	Agathe Guillemot	2:06.35	Maeliss Trapeau	2:12.22
1500 metres	Aurore Fleury	4:17.15	Anaïs Bourgoin	4:20.24	Sarah Madeleine	4:20.66
3000 metres	Margaux Sieracki	9:18.23	Alexa Lemitre	9:20.24	Leila Hadji	9:28.63
3000 m walk	Camille Moutard	12:43.45	Marion Manaresi	13:04.97	Émilie Menuet	13:22.94
60 m hurdles	Laëticia Bapté	8.04	Solenn Compper	8.19	Sacha Alessandrini	8.22
High jump	Juliette Perez	1.83 m	Fatoumata Balley	1.80 m	Solène Gicquel	1.80 m
Pole vault	Margot Chevrier	4.65 m	Ninon Chapelle	4.55 m	Albane Dordain	4.30 m
Long jump	Maëlly Dalmat	6.52 m	Yanis David.	6.50 m	Tiphaine Mauchant	6.31 m
Triple jump	Victoria Josse	13.63 m	Sohane Aucagos	13.14 m	Aminata Ndiaye	13.01 m
Shot put	Amanda Ngandu-Ntumba	15.81 m	Rose Sharon Pierre-Louis	15.35 m	Caroline Métayer	15.26 m
Pentathlon	Léonie Cambours	4435 pts	Annaelle Nyabeu Djapa	4334 pts	Esther Turpin	4222 pts
