= 2014 French Indoor Athletics Championships =

- Dates: 22–23 February
- Host city: Bordeaux
- Venue: Vélodrome de Bordeaux
- Events: 26

The 2014 French Indoor Athletics Championships was the 43rd edition of the national championship in indoor track and field for France, organised by the French Athletics Federation. It was held on 22–23 February at the Vélodrome de Bordeaux in Bordeaux. A total of 26 events (divided evenly between the sexes) were contested over the two-day competition.

== Results ==
=== Men ===
Event	Gold		Silver		Bronze	
60 metres	Christophe Lemaitre	6.63	Ben Bassaw	6.72	Aurel Manga	6.80
200 metres	Jeffrey John	20.91	Teddy Tinmar	21.51	Jean-Baptiste Formet	21.59
400 metres	Angel Chelala	47.65	Bastien Mandrou	47.68	Nicolas Courbière	48.07
800 metres	Paul Renaudie	1:48.94	David Verbrugghe	1:49.44	Kévin Gobillard	1:50.04
1500 metres	Yoann Kowal	3:45.32	Guillaume Adam	3:45.81	Benjamin Pires	3:46.35
5000 m walk	Antonin Boyez	20:13.75	Keny Guinaudeau	20:23.21	Xavier Le Coz	20:25.93
60 m hurdles	Pascal Martinot-Lagarde	7.49	Ladji Doucouré	7.76	Thomas Delmestre	7.80
High jump	Sébastien Deschamps	2.22 m	Florian Labourel	2.19 m	Joris Chapon	2.19 m
Pole vault	Kévin Menaldo	5.65 m	Valentin Lavillenie	5.55 m	Stanley Joseph	5.45 m
Long jump	Kafétien Gomis	7.90 m	Salim Sdiri	7.79 m	Raihau Maiau	7.65 m
Triple jump	Gaëtan Saku Bafuanga Baya	16.48 m	Jean-Marc Pontvianne	16.32 m	Aboubacar Bamba	16.27 m
Shot put	Gaëtan Bucki	19.11 m	Frédéric Dagée	19.04 m	Romain Gotteland	17.99 m
Heptathlon	Bastien Auzeil	5910 pts	Romain Martin	5892 pts	Basile Rolnin	5435 pts

=== Women ===
Event	Gold		Silver		Bronze	
60 metres	Stella Akakpo	7.30	Éloyse Lesueur	7.38	Solenn Compper	7.46
200 metres	Déborah Sananes	23.91	Johanna Danois	24.19	Brigitte Ntiamoah	24.54
400 metres	Estelle Perrossier	54.34	Joëllie Baflan	54.55	Djeneba Camara	54.95
800 metres	Rénelle Lamote	2:07.44	Camille Laplace	2:08.79	Aude Korotchansky	2:08.99
1500 metres	Ophélie Claude-Boxberger	4:23.71	Salomé Lecoq	4:30.13	Lisa Blamèble	4:30.59
3000 m walk	Émilie Tissot	12:41.56	Émilie Menuet	13:04.43	Amandine Marcou	13:44.97
60 m hurdles	Cindy Billaud	7.93	Aisseta Diawara	8.15	Alice Decaux	8.17
High jump	Nawal Meniker	1.81 m	Valérie Bonnet	1.81 m	Melanie Skotnik	1.81 m
Pole vault	Marion Lotout	4.58 m	Marion Fiack	4.51 m	Maria Leonor Tavares	4.36 m
Long jump	Cynthia Bizet	6.13 m	Oriane Gérardot	6.10 m	Pauline Lett	6.06 m
Triple jump	Jeanine Assani Issouf	13.73 m	Nathalie Marie-Nely	13.73 m	Mathilde Boateng	13.48 m
Shot put	Jessica Cérival	17.27 m	Fabienne Digard	16.30 m	Yasmine Merkiled	14.02 m
Pentathlon	Anaelle Nyabeu Djapa	4151 pts	Gaëlle Le Foll	4076 pts	Sandra Jacmaire	4045 pts
