= Mondotrack =

Trademarked synthetic track surface

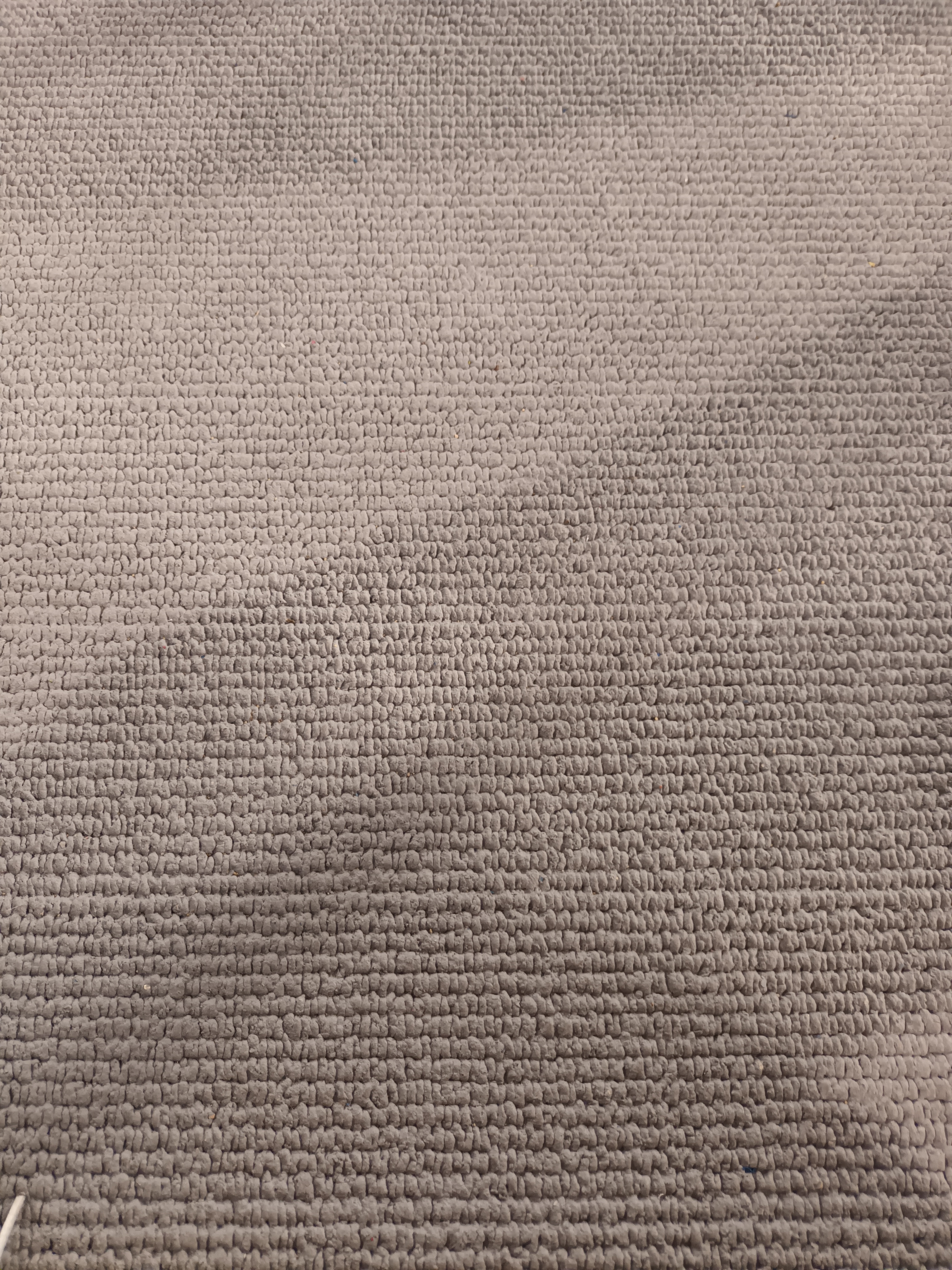
Mondotrack at Stadium Jean-Pellez

Mondotrack is a brand of synthetic surface designed for track and field athletics, produced by the company Mondo. The surface is engineered to provide consistent performance characteristics, with the aim of optimizing athlete speed and reducing injury risk. Mondotrack consists of a vulcanized rubber top layer and a hexagonal base layer, and is produced in various colors. It is used in a range of international athletic facilities and competitions.

== History ==
In 1980, Mondo began research on synthetic materials for athletic track surfaces. The aim of this research was to develop a track surface that could improve performance, reduce injury risk, and provide consistent conditions for athletes. The resulting product, Mondotrack, features a dual-layer structure with a vulcanized rubber top layer and a hexagonal sub-base. Since its commercial introduction, the surface has been installed in various professional and collegiate facilities, including the venue for the 2011 World Athletics Championships. Mondotrack was used for the competition surfaces at the 2012 Olympic Games and 2016 Olympic Games.

== Surface ==
Mondotrack comes in several variations: Mondotrack WS (Championship series), Super X Performance, and Super X 720. The surface is a seamless structure that is created through a vulcanized process. Two distinct layers make up the track: The top layer being a rubber-based soft surface and the bottom layer being a hard elongated hexagonal surface. The thickness is 13.5 mm and is available in eight different colors. Mondotrack comes in rolls no longer than 15 meters in length that are then assembled to make the complete track.

== Spikes ==
Because of the design of the Mondotrack surface, certain spikes for running shoes are required. Compression (Christmas tree) spikes and 6mm (1/4in) pyramid spikes are promoted for use on Mondotracks. These spikes will not damage the track. Needle spikes however, will damage the track. The thin-sharp pointed needle spikes allow the spike to penetrate the surface which can rupture and degrade the track over time.
