= Jean Wadoux =

French middle-distance runner

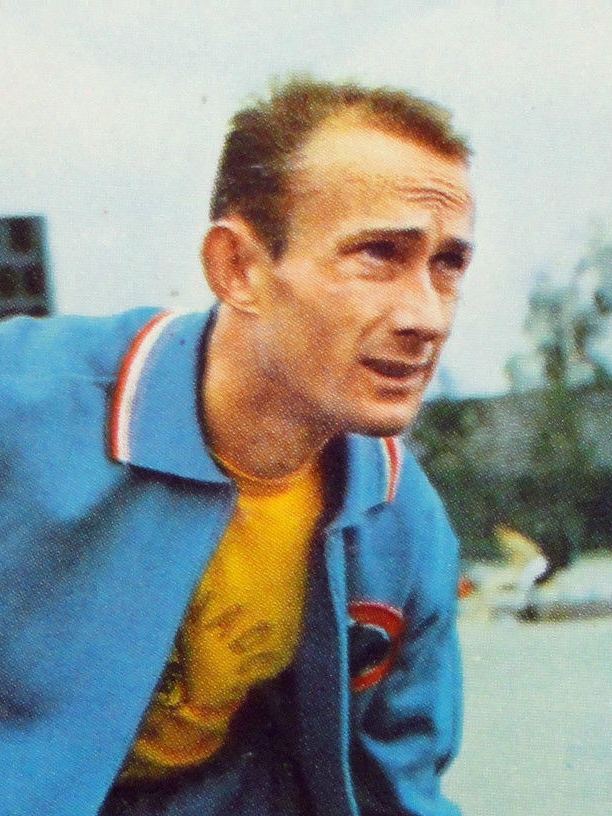

Personal information
- Born: 29 January 1942 (age 84) Saint-Pol-sur-Ternoise, France
- Height: 1.80 m (5 ft 11 in)
- Weight: 60 kg (132 lb)

Sport
- Country: France
- Sport: Athletics
- Event(s): 1500 m, 5000 m
- Club: CA Montreuil; Racing CF, Paris

Achievements and titles
- Personal best(s): 1500 m – 3:34.0 (1970); 5000 m – 13:28.0 (1970)
Medal record
Men's athletics
Representing France
European Championships
Silver medal – second place	1971 Helsinki	5000 m
Mediterranean Games
Gold medal – first place	1963 Naples	1500 m

Jean Wadoux (born 29 January 1942) is a retired French middle-distance runner. He competed at the 1964 Summer Olympics in 1500 m and at the 1968 Summer Olympics in 5000 m and finished in ninth place on both occasions. On 23 July 1970 he set a European record in 1500 m, and next year won a European silver medal in 5000 m.

Wadoux is a former world record holder in the seldom contested 4 × 1500 metres relay, with 14:49.0 minutes in June 1965. His teammates were Michel Jazy, Claude Nicolas and Gérard Vervoort.
