= 2015 French Indoor Athletics Championships =

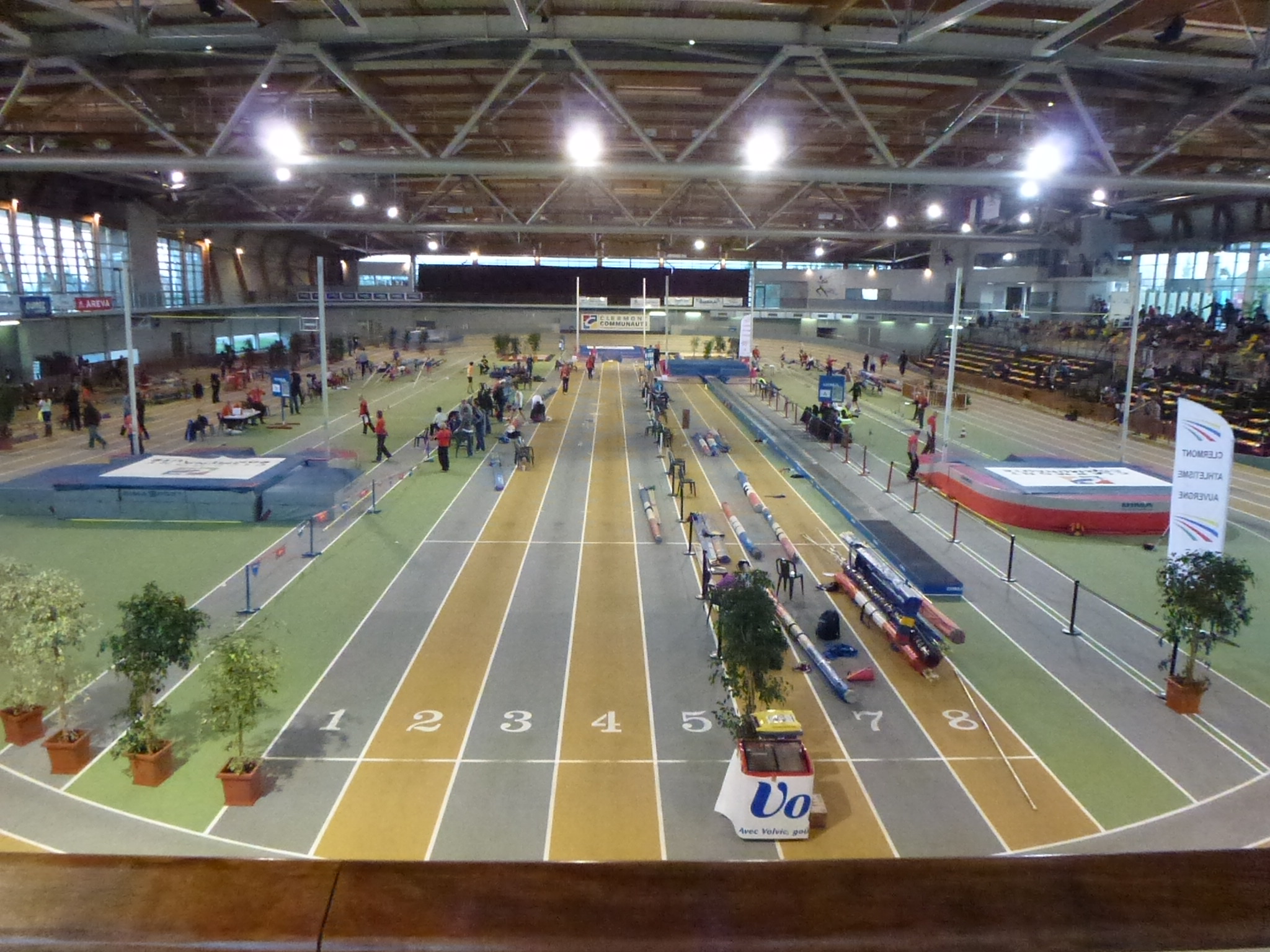
- The host stadium
- Dates: 21–22 February
- Host city: Aubière
- Venue: Jean-Pellez Stadium
- Events: 28

The 2015 French Indoor Athletics Championships was the 44th edition of the national championship in indoor track and field for France, organised by the French Athletics Federation. It was held on 21–22 February at the Jean-Pellez Stadium in Aubière. A total of 28 events (divided evenly between the sexes) were contested over the two-day competition. An indoor 400 metres hurdles was also held as a non-championship demonstration event.

== Results ==
=== Men ===
Event	Gold		Silver		Bronze	
60 metres	Christophe Lemaitre	6.63	Marvin René	6.72	Ben Bassaw	6.75
200 metres	Pierre-Alexis Pessonneaux	20.87	Pierre Vincent	21.02	Jean-Baptiste Formet	21.39
400 metres	Toumany Coulibaly	47.22	Angel Chelala	47.68	Olivier Smug	47.83
800 metres	Brice Leroy	1:51.66	Léo Morgana	1:52.07	Paul Renaudie	1:52.63
1500 metres	Bryan Cantero	3:45.25	Yoann Kowal	3:45.45	Simon Denissel	3:45.88
3000 metres	Hassan Chahdi	8:08.49	Alexandre Saddedine	8:10.15	Mehdi Akaouch	8:10.28
5000 m walk	Antonin Boyez	19:59.28	Guillaume Dujour	20:37.02	Xavier Le Coz	21:00.80
60 m hurdles	Dimitri Bascou	7.48	Wilhem Belocian	7.53	Simon Krauss	7.69
400 m hurdles	Adrien Clemenceau	51.58	Mehdi Omara Besson	52.15	Bruno Bertogal	52.44
High jump	Florian Labourel	2.19 m	Abdoulaye Diarra	2.19 m	Joris Chapon	2.15 m
Pole vault	Renaud Lavillenie	6.01 m	Kévin Menaldo	5.66 m	Valentin Lavillenie	5.66 m
Long jump	Kafétien Gomis	8.18 m	Salim Sdiri	7.80 m	Raihau Maiau	7.78 m
Triple jump	Jean-Marc Pontvianne	16.53 m	Ulrick Bolosier	16.39 m	Martin Lamou	15.85 m
Shot put	Tumatai Dauphin	20.10 m	Gaëtan Bucki	20.09 m	Frédéric Dagée	19.74 m
Heptathlon	Gaël Querin	6065 pts	Bastien Auzeil	5999 pts	Romain Martin	5759 pts

=== Women ===
Event	Gold		Silver		Bronze	
60 metres	Céline Distel-Bonnet	7.27	Stella Akakpo	7.30	Jennifer Galais	7.32
200 metres	Brigitte Ntiamoah	23.57	Elea-Mariama Diarra	23.65	Anaïs Desroses	24.11
400 metres	Marie Gayot	52.14	Agnès Raharolahy	53.45	Déborah Sananes	54.26
800 metres	Rénelle Lamote	2:03.21	Charlotte Mouchet	2:05.31	Clarisse Moh	2:05.64
1500 metres	Claire Perraux	4:22.47	Élodie Normand	4:25.65	Valentine Huze	4:28.20
3000 metres	Fanny Pruvost	9:44.48	Laure Funten-Prévost	9:47.93	Azeline Martino	9:52.40
3000 m walk	Émilie Menuet	13:02.87	Inès Pastorino	13:29.20	Amandine Marcou	13:58.29
60 m hurdles	Sandra Gomis	8.10	Alice Decaux	8.12	Sandra Sogoyou	8.19
High jump	Nawal Meniker	1.85 m	Melanie Skotnik	1.85 m	Sandrine Champion	1.81 m
Pole vault	Marion Fiack	4.60 m	Marion Lotout	4.40 m	Maria Leonor Tavares	4.20 m
Long jump	Haoua Kessely	6.34 m	Antoinette Nana Djimou	6.21 m	Awa Sene	6.18 m
Triple jump	Jeanine Assani-Issouf	14.13 m	Teresa Nzola Meso Ba	13.69 m	Rouguy Diallo	13.59 m
Shot put	Jessica Cérival	16.90 m	Antoinette Nana Djimou	15.30 m	Nadège Mendy	14.73 m
Pentathlon	Anaelle Nyabeu Djapa	4230 pts	Sandra Jacmaire	4138 pts	Gaëlle Le Foll	4108 pts
