= Sylvie Prenveille =

French high jumper

Personal information
- Nationality: France
- Born: 2 September 1958 (age 67) Paris

Sport
- Event: High Jump

Sylvie Prenveille (born 2 September 1958 in Paris) is a former French athlete, who specialized in the high jump.

== Biography ==
She won four championship titles of France in the high jump: one Outdoors in 1980 and three Indoors from 1977 to 1979.

Her personal bests are 1.85 m outdoors (1984), and 1.90 Indoors (1983).

== Events ==
- French Athletics Championships:
  - winner of the high jump in 1980
- French Indoor Athletics Championships:
  - winner of the high jump in 1977, 1978 and 1979

== Records ==
Personal records
Event		Performance	Location	Date
High jump	Outdoors	1.85 m		1984
High jump	Indoors	1.90 m		1983
