= Aurore Fleury =

French middle-distance runner

Personal information
- Nationality: France
- Born: 4 December 1993 (32 years, 241 days old)
- Home town: Meuse, France
- Education: Paris

Sport
- Sport: Athletics
- Events: 1500 metres 3000 metres
- Club: Nancy Athlétisme Métropole

Achievements and titles
- National finals: 2015 French Indoors; • 1500m, 11th; 2015 French Indoor U23s; • 1500m, 3rd (bronze); 2015 French Champs; • 1500m, 7th; 2015 French U23s; • 1500m, 2nd (silver); 2016 French Indoors; • 1500m, 3rd (bronze); 2016 French Champs; • 1500m, 3rd (bronze); 2019 French Champs; • 1500m, 2nd (silver); 2020 French Indoors; • 1500m, 2nd (silver); • 3000m, 5th; 2021 French Indoors; • 1500m, 2nd (silver); 2021 French Champs; • 1500m, 1st (gold); 2022 French Indoors; • 1500m, 1st (gold); 2022 French Champs; • 1500m, 3rd (bronze)
- Personal bests: 1500m: 4:03.35 (2021); 3000m: 9:00.58 (2022)
Medal record
Women's athletics
Representing France
European Cross Country Championships
Bronze medal – third place	2019 Lisbon	Mixed relay
Silver medal – second place	2021 Dublin	Mixed relay
Mediterranean Games
Gold medal – first place	2022 Oran	1500 m
- Updated on 24 December 2023

Aurore Fleury (born 4 December 1993) is a French middle-distance runner. She is the 2021 French Athletics Championships winner at 1500 metres, and the 2022 French Indoor Athletics Championships winner over the same distance.

== Biography ==
Originally from Meuse, Fleury studied in Paris and competes for the Nancy Athlétisme Métropole club. She won medals at both the 2019 and 2021 European Cross Country Championships, both times in the mixed relay.

In 2021, Fleury was considered the top French 1500 m runner, but in 2022 she was sidelined by a knee injury.

At the 2022 Rabat Diamond League, Fleury missed the 2022 World Athletics Championships standard in the 1500 m by just 58 hundredths of a second.

Fleury won her first international gold medal at the 2022 Mediterranean Games, running 4:13 in the 1500 m final.

She was banned by the Athletics Integrity Unit for six months from September 1, 2025 for sports betting and ordered to pay a 3,000 euro fine to charity.

== Statistics ==
=== Personal bests ===
Event	Mark	Place	Competition	Venue	Date
800 metres	2:02.10	1st	Internationales Abendsportfest	Pfungstadt	20 August 2025
1500 metres	4:03.35	8th	Herculis	Monaco	9 July 2021
3000 metres	9:00.58 sh	1st place, gold medalist(s)	Meeting Elite en Salle de Lyon	Lyon, France	21 January 2022
