= Christian Valétudie =

French retired triple jumper (born 1952)

- Born: May 27, 1952 (age 73); Pointe-a-Pitre, Guadeloupe
- Occupation: Jumper

Christian Valétudie (born 27 May 1952 in Pointe-a-Pitre, Guadeloupe) is a French retired triple jumper.

== Career ==
Valétudie finished seventh at the 1974 European Indoor Championships, seventh at the 1975 European Indoor Championships, seventh at the 1976 European Indoor Championships, sixth at the 1977 European Indoor Championships, eleventh at the 1980 European Indoor Championships, and reached the final at the 1980 Summer Olympics without registering a valid mark there. Lastly he won the bronze medal at the 1983 Mediterranean Games.

His personal best jump was 16.80 metres, achieved in September 1979 in Rovereto.
