= Sylvie Borda =

French athlete

Personal information
- Nationality: France
- Born: 4 September 1966 (age 59) Pointe-à-Pitre

Sport
- Event: Triple Jump

Sylvie Borda (born 4 September 1966 in Pointe-à-Pitre) is a French athlete, who specialises in the triple jump.

== Biography ==
She won seven champion of France titles for the triple jump Three outdoor in 1990, 1992 and 1999, and four indoors in 1992, 1993, 1996 and 1998. In 1993 she also became the Indoors champion of France for the Long jump.

She is the first to hold the French record for the triple jump jumping 13.12m on 29 July 1990 in Blois. She improved this record a year later at Dijon with a jump of 13.18m.

=== prize list ===
- French Championships in Athletics :
  - winner of the triple jump 1990, 1992 and 1999
- French Athletics Championships Indoors :
  - winner of the triple jump 1992, 1993, 1996 and 1998
  - winner of the long jump 1993

=== Records ===
personal records
Event	Performance	Location	Date
Triple Jump	14.04 m		1999

== notes and references ==
- Docathlé2003, Fédération française d'athlétisme, 2003, p. 392
