= Claude Nicolas =

French middle-distance runner

Personal information
- Nationality: French
- Born: 21 September 1941 (age 84) Exincourt, France

Sport
- Sport: Middle-distance running
- Event: 1500 metres

Claude Nicolas (born 21 September 1941) is a French middle-distance runner. He competed in the men's 1500 metres at the 1968 Summer Olympics. Nicolas is a former world record holder in the 4 × 1500 metres relay, with 14:49.0 minutes in June 1965. His teammates were Michel Jazy, Gérard Vervoort and Jean Wadoux.
