= Sébastien Thibault =

French hurdler

Personal information
- Born: July 25, 1970 (age 55) Beaupréau, France
- Height: 1.83 m (6 ft 0 in)
- Weight: 75 kg (165 lb)

Sport
- Sport: Track and field
- Events: 110 m hurdles, 60 m hurdles
- Club: Entente des Mauges

Sébastien Thibault (born 25 July 1970 in Beaupréau) is a retired French athlete who specialised in the sprint hurdles. He represented his country at the 1992 Summer Olympics, as well as two outdoor and three indoor World Championships.

His personal bests are 13.45 seconds in the 110 metres hurdles (+1.7 m/s, Narbonne 1992) and 7.65 seconds in the 60 metres hurdles (Valencia 1998).

== Competition record ==
Year	Competition	Venue	Position	Event	Notes
Representing France
1989	European Junior Championships	Varaždin, Yugoslavia	2nd	110 m hurdles	14.14
1990	European Indoor Championships	Glasgow, United Kingdom	20th (h)	60 m hurdles	7.94
1990	European Championships	Split, Yugoslavia	16th (sf)	110 m hurdles	14.19
1991	World Championships	Tokyo, Japan	30th (h)	110 m hurdles	13.92
1992	European Indoor Championships	Genoa, Italy	15th (sf)	60 m hurdles	8.53
1992	Olympic Games	Barcelona, Spain	27th (h)	110 m hurdles	13.94
1993	World Indoor Championships	Toronto, Canada	20th (h)	60 m hurdles	7.91
1995	World Indoor Championships	Barcelona, Spain	23rd (h)	60 m hurdles	7.86
1997	World Indoor Championships	Paris, France	12th (h)	60 m hurdles	7.72
1997	Mediterranean Games	Bari, Italy	–	110 m hurdles	DNF
1997	World Championships	Athens, Greece	21st (qf)	110 m hurdles	13.62
1998	European Indoor Championships	Valencia, Spain	10th (sf)	60 m hurdles	7.65
1998	European Championships	Budapest, Hungary	15th (sf)	110 m hurdles	13.86
