= Michel Jazy =

French runner (1936–2024)

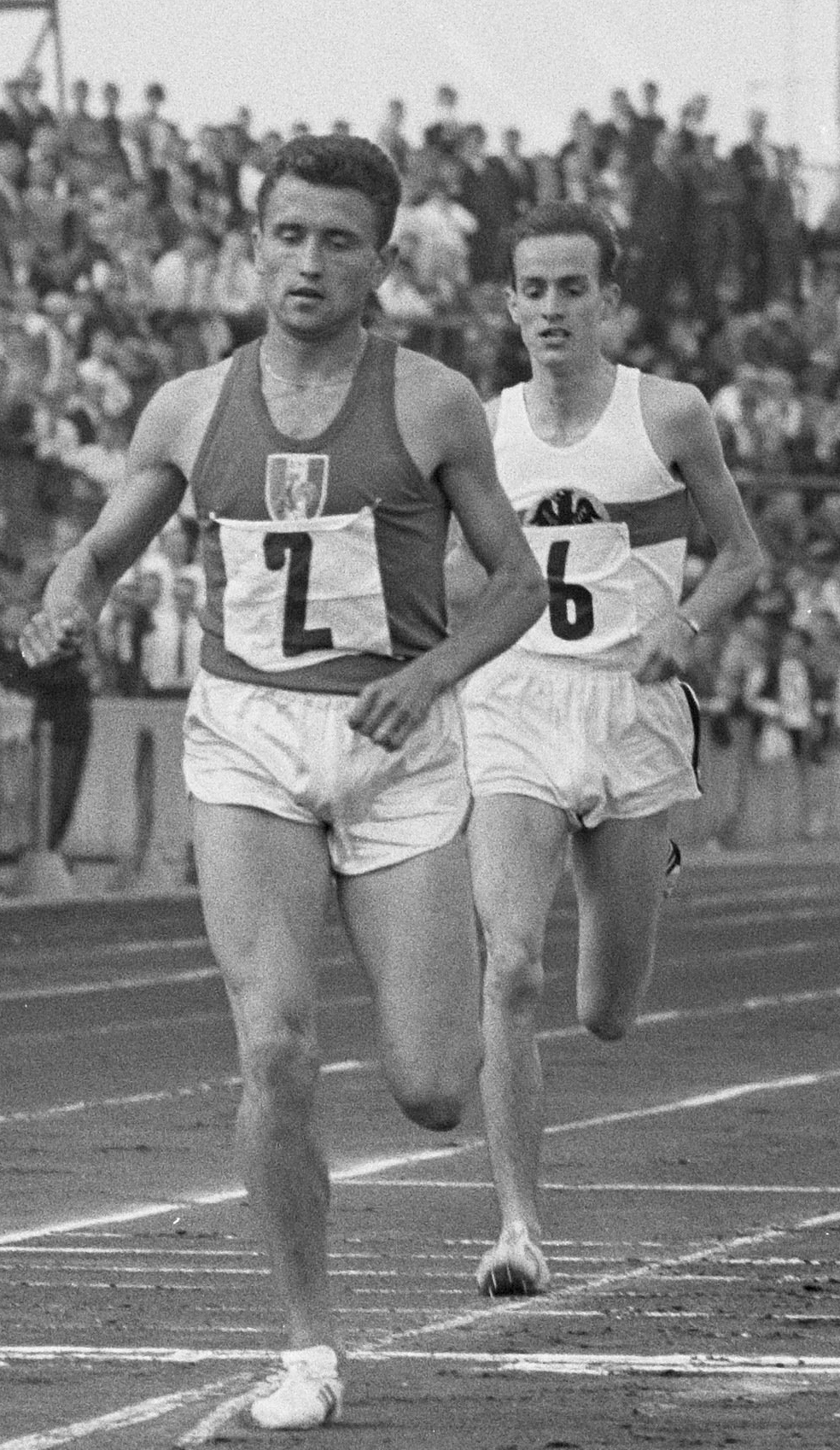
- Jazy (left) in 1963

Personal information
- Nationality: French
- Born: 13 June 1936 Oignies, France
- Died: 1 February 2024 (aged 87) Dax, France
- Height: 1.75 m (5 ft 9 in)
- Weight: 65 kg (143 lb; 10 st 3 lb)

Sport
- Sport: Athletics
- Events: 800–10,000 m, cross-country
- Club: CO Billancourt (1951-1956), CA Montreuil (1956-1968)

Achievements and titles
- Personal bests: 800 m – 1:47.1 (1962); 1500 m – 3:36.3 (1966); 5000 m – 13:27.6 (1965); 10,000 m – 29:03.2 (1965)
Medal record
Men's athletics
Representing France
Olympic Games
Silver medal – second place	1960 Rome	1500 m
European Championships
Gold medal – first place	1962 Belgrade	1500 m
Gold medal – first place	1966 Budapest	5000 m
Silver medal – second place	1966 Budapest	1500 m

Michel Jazy (13 June 1936 – 1 February 2024) was a French middle-distance runner and long-distance runner. He won the 1500 metres silver medal at the 1960 Summer Olympics, as well as two golds (in 1962 and 1966) and one silver (in 1966) at the European Championships. He set nine world records in the mile (once), 2000 metres (twice) and 3000 metres (twice), the two miles (twice) and the 4×1500 metres relay (twice).

== Early life ==
Jazy was born into a poor coal-mining family from Poland. His grandparents along with their daughter, emigrated from Poland to France after World War I. They settled in Oignies. Michel's grandfather worked as a coal miner in nearby Ostricourt. Michel's father was also a coal miner, whereas Michel's mother worked in a brewery in Lille. Michel was raised by his grandmother during much of his childhood. He was 12 years old when his father died of silicosis. When Michel was 14 years old, he, his mother (Marianne Jazy) and his older sister (Alfreda) settled in Paris. Marianne worked as a waitress in a café in Montmartre. Marianne remarried; her new husband, a truck driver, moved the family into a 10-by-12-foot (3 × 4 m), one-room apartment on Rue Rodier in Montmartre. Michel was passionate about football when he was a schoolboy. As a schoolboy, he would spend hours daily playing football. Michel left school at the age of 14 and became a uniformed doorman and elevator operator at a bridge club near the Arc de Triomphe. At 16, he became an apprentice in a neighborhood print shop.

Jazy won his first French national championship title in 1953 – the 1000 m race at the youth level (for those under the age of 18 years). He won his second French national championship title in 1955 – the 1500 m race at the junior level (for those under the age of 20 years). His first coach was René Frassinelli, who, with Charles Poulenard (the coach of the French, middle-distance runner Jules Ladoumègue), quickly saw Jazy's potential. In August 1956, Jazy joined the air force. He did 27 months of military service there, but his running career was not interrupted. He set a national record for the 1,500 meters in 1957. In the same year he married Irène Denis, a secretary from Paris. They had two daughters, Pascale (born 1960) and Véronique (born 1963). After Jazy left the air force at the end of 1958, he worked at a printing plant. His employers there had no sympathy with his athletics training schedule and forced him to work overtime. To his rescue came Gaston Meyer, the editor-in-chief of the French daily sports newspaper L'Équipe. Convinced that Jazy could become a champion, Meyer gave Jazy an afternoon typographer's job, which enabled him to train in the mornings.

== Running career ==
In his first participation at the Olympic Games in Melbourne in 1956, Jazy clocked a time of 3:50.0 in the 1500 metres, which equaled his personal best but was not sufficient to reach the final. Yet, Jazy was pleased with those Games because he was selected to share a room with Alain Mimoun. Jazy later said: “I came to realize down there in Melbourne what glory was and what sacrifices were necessary in the years ahead to obtain it. Alain Mimoun opened my eyes to what I needed to do. I became hungry. I had got the message.”

At the next Olympic Games in Rome in 1960, Jazy won the silver medal in the 1500 metres. In the final, Jazy ran the race of his life to obliterate his personal best time and set a new national record, finishing 18 metres and 2.8 seconds behind Herb Elliott. Elliott won the final in a new world record time.

In the 1964 Olympics 5000 metres final in Tokyo, Jazy took the lead halfway into the first bend of the final lap. He was ahead of the leading runner of the chasing pack by a body length 100 metres from the finish line. However, he faded badly and finished fourth.

On 30 June 1965, Jazy took part in a 5000 metres race held in the Finnish capital, Helsinki. The race, called "the 5000 metres race of the century" by French newspapers, had a world-class field comprising Jazy, Ron Clarke, Jürgen Haase, Kipchoge Keino, Billy Mills and Bob Schul. Jazy won the race in a personal best and new European record time of 13:27.6 minutes, with Keino and Clarke finishing in second and third place, respectively.

On 12 October 1966 in Saint-Maur-des-Fossés, Jazy won a 2000 metres race in 4:56.2 minutes, which was his ninth and last world record.

Between 1961 and 1966, Jazy set nine world records over the mile (once), 2000 metres (twice) and 3000 metres (twice), the two miles (twice) and the 4×1500 metres relay (twice). Four of those records – the mile, the 3000 metres, the two miles and the 4×1500 metres relay – were set in June 1965. He also set 17 European and 47 national records.

Between 1956 and 1966, Jazy won nine national track titles: two over 800 m, six over 1500 m and one over 5000 m, and three national cross-country titles. He was chosen as the French L'Équipe Champion of Champions in 1960, 1962 and 1965, and was awarded the first Trophée Micheline Ostermeyer on 4 November 2004.

== Death ==
Jazy died in Dax on 1 February 2024, at the age of 87.

== World records ==
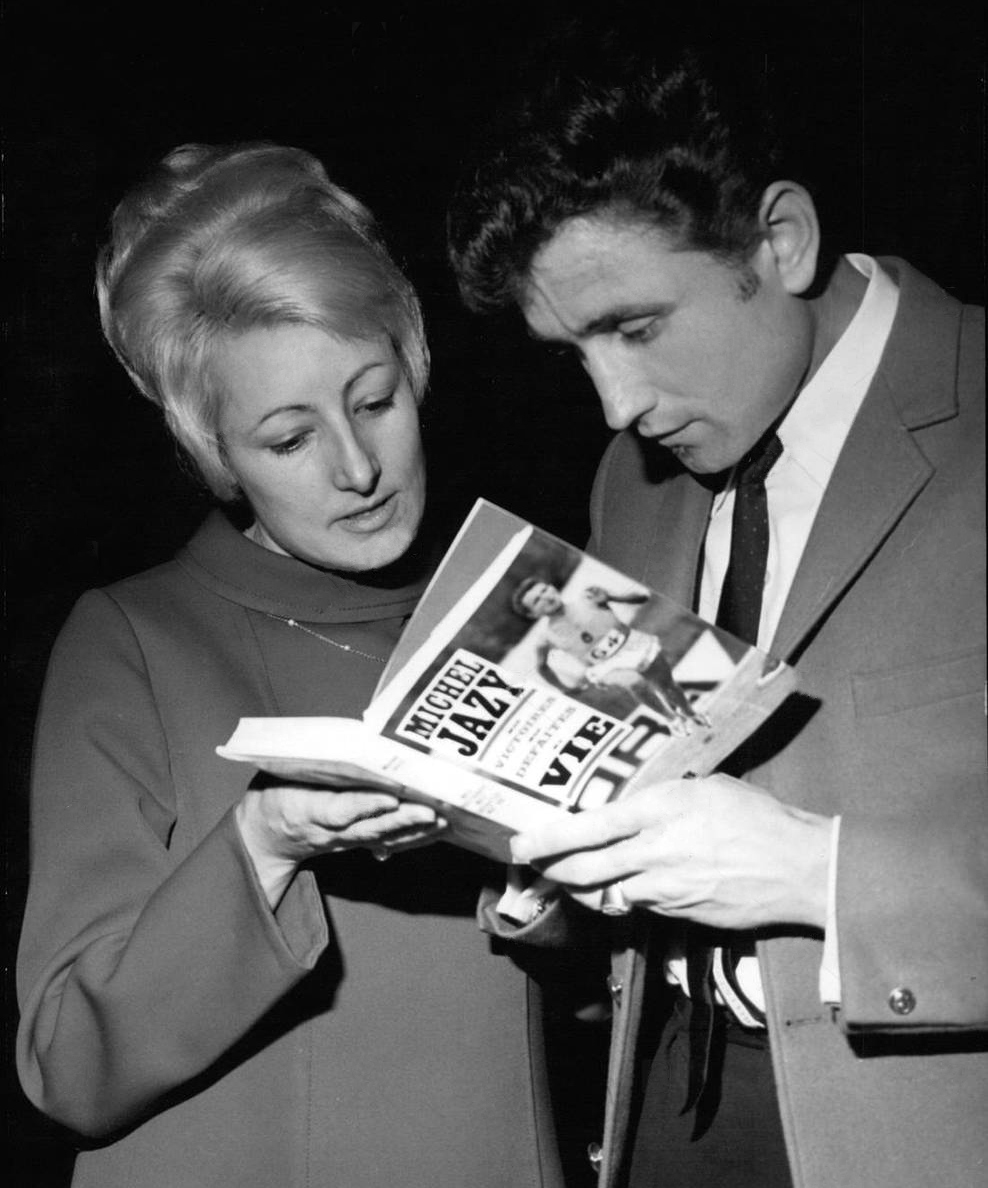
Jazy shows his book Mes victoires, mes défaites, ma vie to wife Irène in 1967

Between 1961 and 1966, Jazy set nine world records over the following distances:

- mile (once)
  - time of 3:53.6 minutes on 9 June 1965 in Rennes
- 2000 metres (twice)
  - time of 5:01.6 minutes on 14 June 1962 in Paris
  - time of 4:56.2 minutes on 12 October 1966 in Saint-Maur-des-Fossés
- 3000 metres (twice)
  - time of 7:49.2 minutes on 27 June 1962 in Saint-Maur-des-Fossés
  - time of 7:49.0 minutes on 23 June 1965 in Melun
- 2 miles (twice)
  - time of 8:29.6 minutes on 6 June 1963 in Paris
  - time of 8:22.6 minutes on 23 June 1965 in Melun
- 4×1500 metres relay (twice)
  - time of 15:04.2 minutes on 28 June 1961 in Versailles (the other members of the relay team were Michel Bernard, Robert Bogey and Jean Clausse)
  - time of 14:49.0 minutes on 25 June 1965 in Saint-Maur-des-Fossés (the other members of the relay team were Claude Nicolas, Gérard Vervoort and Jean Wadoux)

== Personal bests ==
- 800 metres: 1:47.1 minutes (1962)
- 1500 metres: 3:36.3 minutes (1966)
- mile: 3:53.6 minutes in Rennes in 1965 (This was a world record that was broken in July 1966 by Jim Ryun. It remained the European mile record until it was broken by Eamon Coghlan in 1975)
- 2000 metres: 4:56.2 minutes in Saint-Maur-des-Fossés in 1966 (This was a world record that was broken only in June 1976 by John Walker.)
- 3000 metres: 7:49.0 minutes in Melun in 1965 (This was a world record that was broken only six weeks later by Siegfried Herrmann.)
- 2 miles: 8:22.6 minutes in Melun in 1965 (This was a world record that was broken in July 1967 by Ron Clarke.)
- 5000 metres: 13:27.6 minutes (1965)
- 4×1500 metres relay (Michel Jazy, Claude Nicolas, Gérard Vervoort and Jean Wadoux): 14:49.0 minutes in Saint-Maur-des-Fossés in 1965 (This was a world record and Jazy ran the third leg of the relay race.)

== Competition record ==
=== International ===
(only the position and time in the final are indicated, unless otherwise stated)

Year	Competition	Venue	Position	Event	Notes
Representing France
1956	Olympic Games	Melbourne	7th (h)	1500 m	3:50.0
1958	European Championships	Stockholm	10th	1500 m	3:45.4
1960	Olympic Games	Rome	2nd	1500 m	3:38.4
1962	European Championships	Belgrade	1st	1500 m	3:40.9
1964	Olympic Games	Tokyo	4th	5000 m	13:49.8
1966	European Championships	Budapest	1st	5000 m	13:42.8
1966	European Championships	Budapest	2nd	1500 m	3:42.2

=== National ===
- Championnats de France d'athlétisme (French National Athletics Championships)
  - 800 m: 2 titles (1961 and 1962)
  - 1,500 m: 6 titles (1956, 1957, 1958, 1960, 1963 and 1964)
  - 5,000 m: 1 title (1966)
- Championnat de France de cross-country (French National Cross Country Championships)
  - 3 titles (1962, 1965 and 1966)

Records
Preceded by (New Zealand) Peter Snell	Men's Mile World Record Holder; 9 June 1965 – 17 July 1966	Succeeded by (United States) Jim Ryun
Preceded by (England) Gordon Pirie	Men's 3000 m World Record Holder; 27 June 1962 – 5 August 1965	Succeeded by (East Germany) Siegfried Herrmann
Preceded by (Czech Republic) Stanislav Jungwirth	European Record Holder Men's 1500 m 28 July 1963 – 13 July 1965	Succeeded by (West Germany) Jurgen May
Preceded by (West Germany) Jurgen May	European Record Holder Men's 1500 m 25 June 1966 – 22 July 1970	Succeeded by (France) Jean Wadoux
