= Odile Lesage =

French heptathlete

Personal information
- Nationality: France
- Born: 28 June 1969 (age 56)

Sport
- Event: Combined Events

Odile Lesage (born 28 June 1969, in Paris) is a retired French heptathlete.

She finished eighth at the 1988 World Junior Championships, seventeenth at the 1991 World Championships, third at the 1993 Mediterranean Games and twelfth at the 1992 European Indoor Championships.

She is married to Stéphane Diagana with whom she has three children.

== Prize list ==
- World Record Holder in pentathlon in 1991, with 4451 pts
- French junior Record Holder in the heptathlon en 1988, with 5845 pts
- French junior Record Holder in the combined events in 1987, with 5616 pts
- (gold) French Champion in heptathlon for 1989 and 1991
- (gold) French Champion in the Indoor pentathlon in 1989, 1990, 1991, 1994 et 1995
- (gold) French National High Jump Champion in 1990
- (gold) French Junior Champion in the heptathlon for 1988
- (gold) French Junior Champion for the Indoor heptathlon in 1988
- (gold) French Junior Champion for the Combined Events for 1987
- (gold) French Junior Champion for the team heptathlon in 1988
- (gold) French Junior Champion for the team combined events in 1987
- (bronze) 3rd Mediterranean Games en 1993

Sporting positions
Preceded by (France) Madely Beaugendre	French National High Jump Champion; 1990	Succeeded by (Czechoslovakia) Jana Brenkusová
