= Annick Lefebvre =

French shot putter

Personal information
- Other names: Annick Lefebvre-Maurice
- Born: Annick Maurice; 19 September 1965 (age 60) Metz, Franze
- Height: 170 cm (5 ft 7 in)
- Weight: 83 kg (183 lb)

Sport
- Country: France
- Sport: Athletics
- Event: Shot put

Annick Lefebvre (born Maurice on 19 September 1965 in Metz) is a former French athlete who specialised in the shot put.

== Biography ==
Annick won nine French national titles in the shot put, 5 outdoor in 1990, 1991, 1992, 1994 and 1995, and 4 indoors in 1990, 1991, 1992 and 1994.

== Honours ==
- French Championships in Athletics :
  - 5 times winner of the shot put in 1990, 1991, 1992, 1994 and 1995.
- French Indoor Athletics Championships :
  - 4 times winner of the shot put in 1990, 1991, 1992 and 1994

== Records ==
personal records
Event	Performance	Location	Date
Shot Put	16.35m		1991
