= Basile Rolnin =

French decathlete

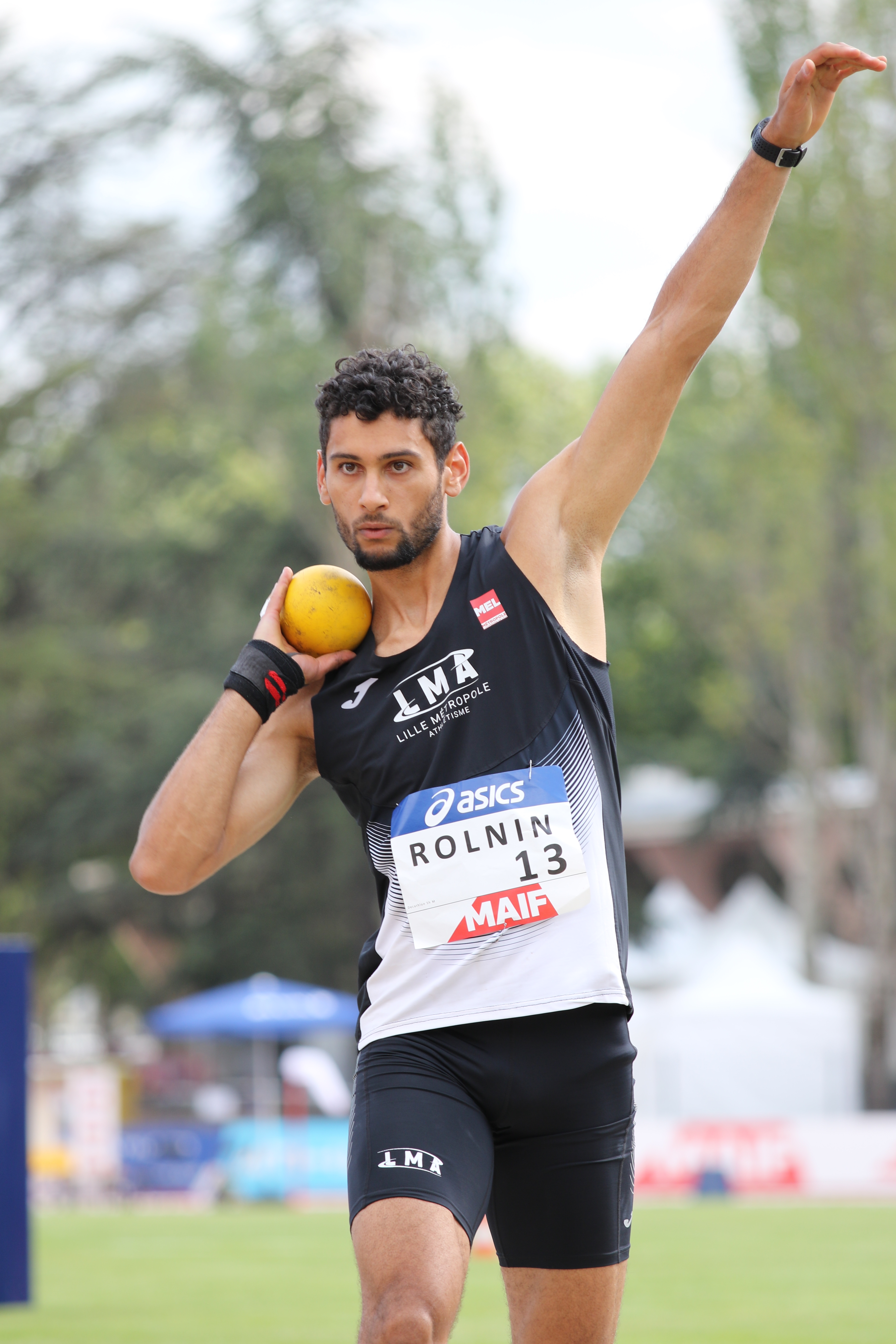
- Rolnin in 2019

Sport
- Country: France
- Sport: Track and field
- Event: Decathlon
Medal record
Men's athletics
French Indoor Championships
| Bronze medal – third place | 2014 Bordeaux | Heptathlon |

Basile Rolnin is a French athletics competitor competing in combined events. In 2019, he competed in the men's decathlon at the 2019 World Athletics Championships held in Doha, Qatar. He competed in the 100 metres and he was not able to compete in the other events due to injury.

In 2014, he won the bronze medal in the heptathlon competition at the 2014 French Indoor Athletics Championships held in Bordeaux, France. The following year, he finished in 8th place in the men's decathlon competition at the 2015 European Athletics U23 Championships held in Tallinn, Estonia.
