= Gérard Vervoort =

Gérard Vervoort (born 6 May 1936) is a retired French runner.

He competed in the 800 metres at the 1958 European Championships without reaching the final. He later finished eighth in the 3000 metres at the 1971 European Indoor Championships.

Vervoort is a former world record holder in the seldom-contested 4 × 1500 metres relay, with 14:49.0 minutes in June 1965. His teammates were Michel Jazy, Claude Nicolas and Jean Wadoux.
