= Évelyne Lebret =

Personal information
- Nationality: France
- Born: 20 February 1938 (age 87) Nîmes

Sport
- Event(s): 400 m, 800 m

Evelyne Lebret (born 20 February 1938 at Nîmes) is a former French athlete, who specialised in the 400 and 800 meters.

== Biography ==
She won three titles French championships : the 400m in 1961 and 1962, and the 800m in 1965.

She improved six times the French record in the 400 meters, bringing it to 54 s 5 in 1964 when she ran 8th in the final of the Tokyo Olympics.

=== Prize list ===
International Awards
Date	Competition	Location	Result	Event	Performance
1964	Olympic Games	Tokyo	8th	400 m	54 s 5

=== Records ===
Personal records
Event	Performance	Location	Date
400 m	54 s 5		1964
800 m	2 min 12 s 0		1965
