= Henry Elliott (athlete) =

French high jumper

Personal information
- Nationality: French
- Born: 15 February 1946 (age 79) Reims, France

Sport
- Sport: Athletics
- Event: High jump

Henry Elliott (born 15 February 1946) is a French athlete. He competed in the men's high jump at the 1968 Summer Olympics and the 1972 Summer Olympics.
