= Patrick Malrieu =

French industrial executive and Breton music historian (1945–2019)

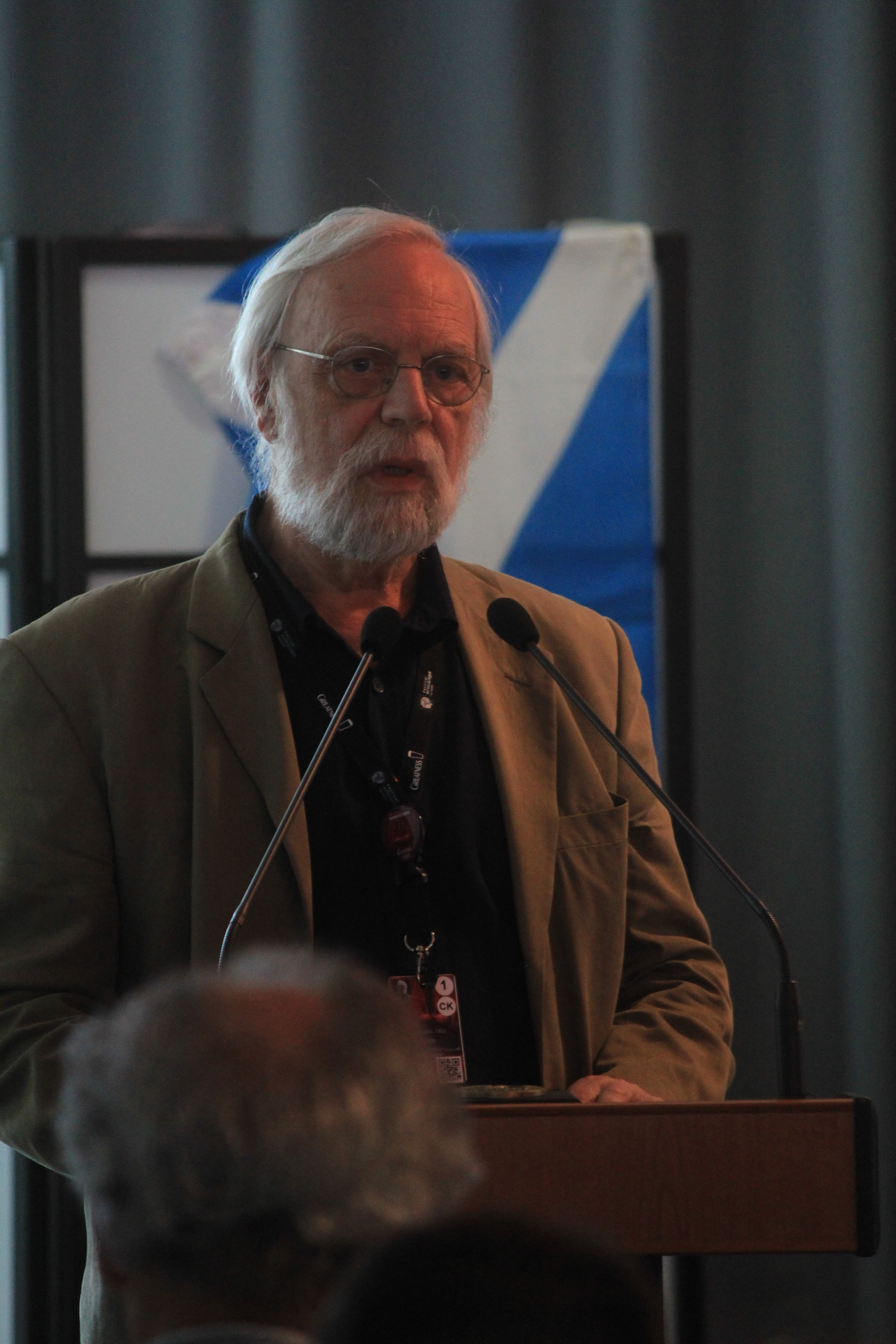
- Alex Salmond conference at the Festival Interceltique Lorient 2017 - 7830
- Born: March 31, 1945; Amboise, France
- Died: 10 January 2019 (aged 73)
- Occupations: Industrial Executive; Music historian

Patrick Malrieu (31 March 1945 – 10 January 2019) was a French industrial executive and a Breton music historian.

== Early life and education ==
Malrieu attended high school in Paris, and went to École Estienne for college.

== Career ==
He worked for the Brodard & Taupin printing office, and was soon promoted to technical director. After 10 years, Malrieu left for Oberthur Fiduciaire, where he would spend only one year. After that, he became head of printing for Ouest-France's Publihebdos SAS. He became president of printing press Auger-Mauger in 1999, and worked there until 2004. He would then retire from the printing industry.

== Other positions ==
In addition to his professional career, Malrieu was also invested in Breton culture. He began to collect traditional Breton music in 1967, and founded Dastum in 1972 to preserve and collect pieces of Breton work. He would preside over the organization for over 23 years. He supported a doctoral thesis on Breton folk music at The University of Rennes 2 in 1998. He was president of the Cultural Council of Brittany from 2003-2009.

From 2011 until his death, he was the president of Institut Culturel de Bretagne.

Malrieu was inducted into the Order of the Ermine in 1999.

== Works ==
- Qui veut faire l’ange fait la bête : De la « gwerz » bretonne de Yann Girin à la légende hagiographique et au mythe, University of Rennes 2, Centre de recherches bretonnes et celtiques, 2010
- La chanson populaire de tradition orale en langue bretonne : contribution à l’établissement d’un catalogue, University of Rennes 2, 1998
- Histoire de la chanson populaire bretonne, Dastum/Skol, 1983
