= Émilie Tissot =

French racewalker

Personal information
- Nationality: French
- Born: 11 April 1993 (age 33) Strasbourg
- Years active: 2010s
- Height: 1.59 m (5 ft 3 in)

Sport
- Event: race walking

Emily Tissot (French: [emili tiso]; born 11 April 1993 in Strasbourg) is a French athlete, who specializes in race walking.

== Biography ==
=== Prize list ===
- French Championships in Athletics:
  - winner of 10 000 m walk 2014
  - winner of the 20 km walk in 2013
- French Indoor Athletics Championships:
  - winner of 3000 m walk 2013 and 2014

=== Records ===
Personal Bests
Event	Performance	Location	Date
20 km walk	1:36.38	Dudince	19 May 2013
