= Jean-Pellez Stadium =

Indoor athletics stadium, next to Clermont-Ferrand, France

Stadium Jean Pellez
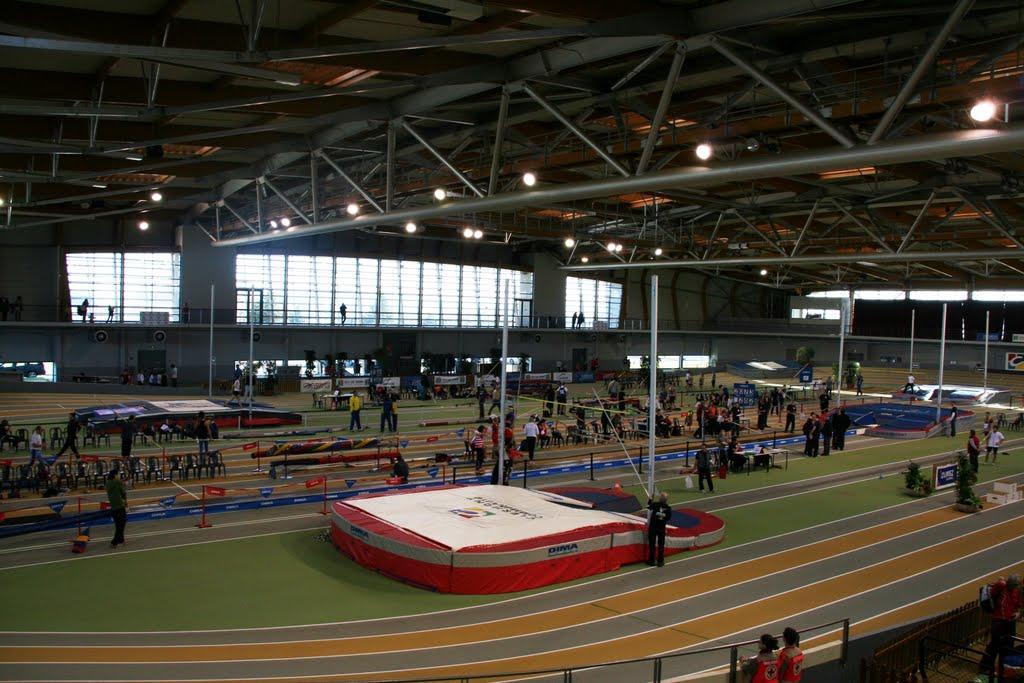

- Location within France
- Coordinates: 45.757°N 3.106°E
- Capacity: 2700 places, 500 seated + 500 telescopic +1750 demountables
- Surface: Mondotrack

Construction
- Built: 2000-2002
- Architect: CRR Architectes Vincent Rivoire

Tenants
- Clermont Athlétisme Auvergne

The Jean-Pellez Stadium is an indoor stadium of athletics of 6 462 m^{2} located in the greater Clermont-Ferrand in the commune of Aubière. It was inaugurated on 28 September 2002 by Serge Godard, Mayor of Clermont-Ferrand. This indoor stadium has hosted several times the Indoor Athletics Championships Of France.

== History ==
The stadium is named for Jean Pellez, an athlete from Auvergne born in 1939 in Valenciennes and who died in September 1998, who ran in several tournaments including the 800 meters in 1963.

== Characteristics ==
It hosts regional, national, and even global athletic competitions, including the Athletics Indoor Championships in France.

Other sports are practiced like gymnastics or fencing.

== Numbers ==
- Its occupancy rate has reached 97% which is the highest for an indoor French stadium
- Capacity 2 700 places

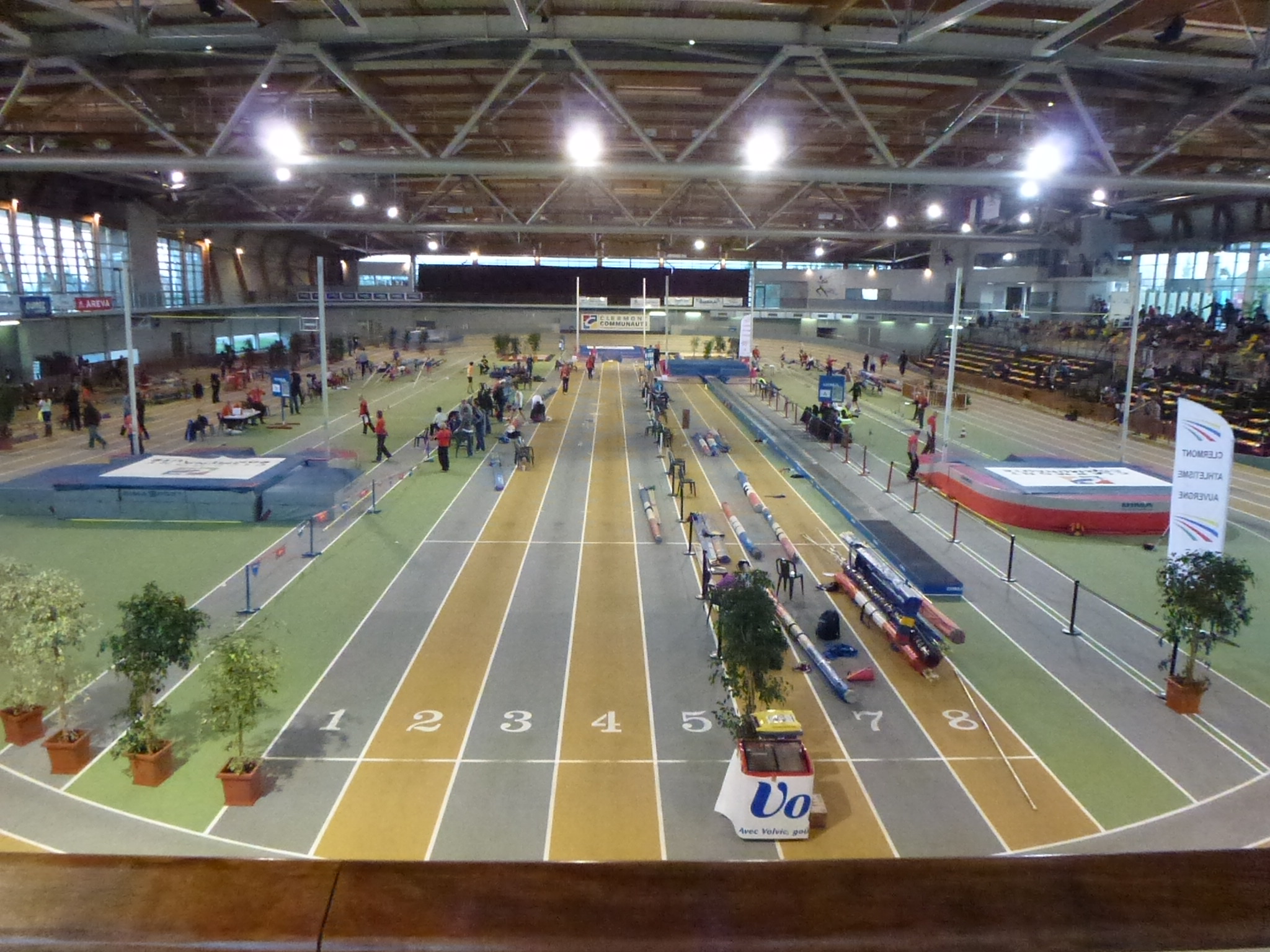
The Stadium Jean-Pellez at the meeting Capital Perche Elite Tour January 14, 2012

== Annexes ==
: document used as a source for writing this article.
