= French Indoor Athletics Championships =

Annual indoor track and field competition

- Sport: Indoor track and field
- Founded: 1972
- Country: France

The French Indoor Athletics Championships (French: Championnats de France d'athlétisme en salle) is an annual indoor track and field competition organised by the Fédération française d'athlétisme (FFA), which serves as the French national championship for the sport. Typically held over two to three days in February during the French winter, it was first added to the national calendar in 1972, supplementing the main outdoor French Athletics Championships held in the summer since 1888.

== Events ==
The following athletics events feature as standard on the French Indoor Championships programme:

- Sprint: 60 m, 200 m, 400 m
- Distance track events: 800 m, 1500 m, 3000 m
- Hurdles: 60 m hurdles
- Jumps: long jump, triple jump, high jump, pole vault
- Throws: shot put
- Racewalking: 5000 m (men), 3000 m (women)
- Combined events: heptathlon (men), pentathlon (women)

== Editions ==
| Edition | Date | Location | Venue |
|---|---|---|---|
| 1972 | 12–13 February | Grenoble | |
| 1973 | 17–18 February | Vittel | |
| 1974 | 16–17 February | Vittel | |
| 1975 | 15–16 February | Orléans | Parc des expositions de la Motte Minsard |
| 1976 | 7–8 February | Orléans | Parc des expositions de la Motte Minsard |
| 1977 | 19–20 February | Orléans | Parc des expositions de la Motte Minsard |
| 1978 | 17–18 February | Grenoble | |
| 1979 | 3–4 February | Paris | INSEP |
| 1980 | 9–10 February | Paris | INSEP |
| 1981 | 7–8 February | Grenoble | |
| 1982 | 20–21 February | Paris | INSEP |
| 1983 | 19–20 February | Paris | INSEP |
| 1984 | 18–19 February | Paris | INSEP |
| 1985 | 16–17 February | Paris | INSEP |
| 1986 | 25–26 February | Liévin | Stade couvert régional |
| 1987 | 7–8 February | Liévin | Stade couvert régional |
| 1988 | 20–21 February | Liévin | Stade couvert régional |
| 1989 | 4–5 February | Liévin | Stade couvert régional |
| 1990 | 17–18 February | Bordeaux | |
| 1991 | 16–17 February | Liévin | Stade couvert régional |
| 1992 | 15–16 February | Bordeaux | |
| 1993 | 27–28 February | Liévin | Stade couvert régional |
| 1994 | 26–27 February | Bordeaux | |
| 1995 | 25–26 February | Liévin | Stade couvert régional |
| 1996 | 10–11 February | Paris | Palais omnisports de Paris-Bercy |
| 1997 | 22–23 February | Bordeaux | |
| 1998 | 14–15 February | Bordeaux | |
| 1999 | 12–14 February | Liévin | Stade couvert régional |
| 2000 | 18–20 February | Liévin | Stade couvert régional |
| 2001 | 16–18 February | Liévin | Stade couvert régional |
| 2002 | 15–17 February | Liévin | Stade couvert régional |
| 2003 | 28 February–2 March | Aubière | Stadium Jean-Pellez |
| 2004 | 20–22 February | Aubière | Stadium Jean-Pellez |
| 2005 | 18–20 February | Liévin | Stade couvert régional |
| 2006 | 24–26 February | Aubière | Stadium Jean-Pellez |
| 2007 | 16–18 February | Aubière | Stadium Jean-Pellez |
| 2008 | 15–17 February | Bordeaux | Stadium de Bordeaux-Lac |
| 2009 | 20–21 February | Liévin | Stade couvert régional |
| 2010 | 27–28 February | Paris | Palais omnisports de Paris-Bercy |
| 2011 | 19–20 February | Aubière | Stadium Jean-Pellez |
| 2012 | 25–26 February | Aubière | Stadium Jean-Pellez |
| 2013 | 16–17 February | Aubière | Stadium Jean-Pellez |
| 2014 | 22–23 February | Bordeaux | Stadium de Bordeaux-Lac |
| 2015 | 21–22 February | Aubière | Stadium Jean-Pellez |
| 2016 | 27–28 February | Aubière | Stadium Jean-Pellez |
| 2017 | 18–19 February | Bordeaux | Stadium de Bordeaux-Lac |
| 2018 | 17–18 February | Liévin | Arena stade couvert |
| 2019 | 16–17 February | Miramas | Stadium Miramas Métropole |
| 2020 | 29 February – 1 March | Liévin | Arena stade couvert |
| 2021 | 19–21 February | Miramas | Stadium Miramas Métropole |
| 2022 | 26–27 February | Miramas | Stadium Miramas Métropole |

== Championship records ==
=== Men ===
| Event | Record | Athlete | Date | Place | Ref. |
|---|---|---|---|---|---|
| 100 m | | | | | |
| 200 m | | | | | |
| Heptathlon | | | | | |
| Heptathlon | 60m / Long jump / Shot put / High jump / 60m H / Pole vault / 1000m | | | | |

=== Women ===
| Event | Record | Athlete | Date | Place | Ref. |
|---|---|---|---|---|---|
| Pole vault | 4.65 m | Margot Chevrier | 26 February 2022 | Miramas | |
| Pentathlon | | | | | |
| Pentathlon | 60m H / High jump / Shot put / Long jump / 800m | | | | |
