= Cyprus at the 2026 European Athletics Championships =

- Flag of Cyprus
- WA code: CYP

in Birmingham, United Kingdom 10–16 August 2026
- Competitors: 12 (6 men and 6 women)
- Medals: Gold 0 Silver 0 Bronze 0 Total 0

European Athletics Championships appearances
- 1974; 1978; 1982; 1986; 1990; 1994; 1998; 2002; 2006; 2010; 2012; 2014; 2016; 2018; 2022; 2024; 2026

Cyprus competed at the 2026 European Athletics Championships in Birmingham, United Kingdom from 10–16 August 2026.

== Results ==
Cyprus entered the following athletes.

Key

- Q = Qualified for the next round
- q = Qualified for the next round as a fastest loser or, in field events, by position without achieving the qualifying target
- NR = National record
- PB = Personal best
- SB = Season best
- N/A = Round not applicable for the event

Track and road events

Athlete	Event	Heat		Semifinal		Final	
Athlete	Event	Result	Rank	Result	Rank	Result	Rank
Milan Trajkovic	Men's 110 m hurdles	13.50	1 q	13.40	2 Q	13.87	8
Kalliopi Kountouri	Women's 400 m	54.45	19	Did not advance			

Field events
Men

Athlete	Event	Qualification		Final	
Athlete	Event	Distance	Position	Distance	Position
Loizos Chrysostomou	High jump	2.10	24	Did not advance	
Antranik Sarkis Ashdjian	Triple jump	15.45	22	Did not advance	
Grigoris Nikolaou	Triple jump	15.77	18	Did not advance	
Petros Michaelides	Shot put	18.78	21	Did not advance	
Iosif Kesidis	Hammer throw	75.48	11 q	72.27	12

Women

Athlete	Event	Qualification		Final	
Athlete	Event	Distance	Position	Distance	Position
Styliana Ioannidou	High jump	1.80	28	Did not advance	
Elena Kulichenko	High jump	1.91 =SB	1 Q	1.88	10
Filippa Fotopoulou	Long jump	6.60	13	Did not advance	
Valentina Savva	Hammer throw	65.50	19	Did not advance	
