= Cyprus at the 2022 European Athletics Championships =

- Flag of Cyprus
- WA code: CYP
- National federation: Amateur Athletic Association of Cyprus

in Munich, Germany 15 August 2022 – 21 August 2022
- Competitors: 7 (3 men and 4 women) in 8 events
- Medals: Gold 0 Silver 0 Bronze 0 Total 0

European Athletics Championships appearances
- 1974; 1978; 1982; 1986; 1990; 1994; 1998; 2002; 2006; 2010; 2012; 2014; 2016; 2018; 2022; 2024

Cyprus competed at the 2022 European Athletics Championships in Munich, Germany, between 15 and 21 August 2022

== Results ==
Cyprus entered the following athletes.

Key

- Q = Qualified for the next round
- q = Qualified for the next round as a fastest loser or, in field events, by position without achieving the qualifying target
- NR = National record
- PB = Personal best
- SB = Season best
- N/A = Round not applicable for the event

Men
Track and road

Athletes	Event	Heats		Semifinal		Final	
Athletes	Event	Result	Rank	Result	Rank	Result	Rank
Milan Trajkovic	110 metres hurdles	Bye		13.54	9	did not advance	

Field events

Athletes	Event	Qualification		Final	
Athletes	Event	Distance	Position	Distance	Position
Apostolos Parellis	Discus throw	61.95	11 q	63.32	8
Alexandros Poursanidis	Hammer throw	70.56	21	did not advance	

Women
Track and road

Athletes	Event	Heats		Semifinal		Final	
Athletes	Event	Result	Rank	Result	Rank	Result	Rank
Natalia Christofi	100 metres hurdles	13.53	18	did not advance			
Olivia Fotopoulou	100 metres	11.62	20	did not advance			
Olivia Fotopoulou	200 metres	23.40	15 Q	23.33	12	did not advance	

Field events

Athletes	Event	Qualification		Final	
Athletes	Event	Distance	Position	Distance	Position
Filippa Fotopoulou	Long jump	6.54	11 q	6.26	12
Androniki Lada	Discus throw	52.80	24	did not advance	
