= Cyprus at the 2016 European Athletics Championships =

- WA code: CYP
- National federation: KOEAS
- Website: www.koeas.org.cy

in Amsterdam
- Competitors: 13 (7 men and 6 women) in 10 events
- Medals: Gold 0 Silver 0 Bronze 0 Total 0

European Athletics Championships appearances
- 1974; 1978; 1982; 1986; 1990; 1994; 1998; 2002; 2006; 2010; 2012; 2014; 2016; 2018; 2022; 2024

Cyprus competed at the 2016 European Athletics Championships in Amsterdam, Netherlands, between 6 and 10 July 2016.

== Results ==
Men

Track & road events

Athlete	Event	Heat		Semifinal		Final	
Athlete	Event	Result	Rank	Result	Rank	Result	Rank
Amine Khadiri	1500 m	3:44.61	25	—		did not advance	
Milan Trajkovic	110 m hurdles	13.39 NR	1 Q	13.40	7 q	13.44	5

Field Events

Athlete	Event	Qualification		Final	
Athlete	Event	Distance	Rank	Distance	Rank
Vasilios Constantinou	High jump	2.25 =SB	8 Q	2.24	=9
Dimitrios Hondrokoukis	High jump	2.25 =SB	6	2.24	=7
Kyriakos Ioannou	High jump	2.25	=10 q	NM	
Apostolos Parellis	Discus throw	61.89	18	did not advance	
Constantinos Stathelakos	Hammer throw	70.20	22	did not advance	

Women

Track & road events

Athlete	Event	Heat		Semifinal		Final	
Athlete	Event	Result	Rank	Result	Rank	Result	Rank
Ramona Papaioannou	100 m	11.36	2 Q	11.55	14	did not advance	
Eleni Artymata	200 m	23.46	12 Q	23.58	20	did not advance	
Natalia Evangelidou	800 m	2:05.73	27 Q	2:03.99	24	did not advance	
Eleni Artymata; Filippa Fotopoulou; Olivia Fotopoulou; Ramona Papaioannou	4 × 100 m relay	43.87 NR	9	—		did not advance	

Field Events

Athlete	Event	Qualification		Final	
Athlete	Event	Distance	Rank	Distance	Rank
Nektaria Panagi	Long jump	6.33	17	did not advance	
