= Cyprus at the 2018 European Athletics Championships =

- WA code: CYP
- National federation: KOEAS
- Website: www.koeas.org.cy

in Berlin
- Competitors: 11 (7 men and 4 women) in 12 events
- Medals: Gold 0 Silver 0 Bronze 0 Total 0

European Athletics Championships appearances
- 1974; 1978; 1982; 1986; 1990; 1994; 1998; 2002; 2006; 2010; 2012; 2014; 2016; 2018; 2022; 2024

Cyprus competed at the 2018 European Athletics Championships in Berlin, Germany, from 6–12 August 2018. A delegation of 11 athletes were sent to represent the country.

The following athletes were selected to compete by the mateur Athletic Association of Cyprus.

== Results ==
Men
Track and road

Athletes	Event	Heats		Semifinal		Final	
Athletes	Event	Result	Rank	Result	Rank	Result	Rank
Paisios Dimitriades	200 metres	21.31	9	did not advance			
Christos Demetriou	800 metres	1.50.62	31	did not advance			
Amine Khadiri	1500 metres	3.45.97	19	—		did not advance	
Milan Trajkovic	110 metres hurdles	Bye		13.57	4	did not advance	

Field events

Athletes	Event	Qualification		Final	
Athletes	Event	Distance	Position	Distance	Position
Vasilios Constantinou	High jump	2.11	26	did not advance	
Nikandros Stylianou	Pole vault	5.36	22	did not advance	
Apostolos Parellis	Discus throw	62.32	10 q	63.62	8

Women
Track and road

Athletes	Event	Heats		Semifinal		Final	
Athletes	Event	Result	Rank	Result	Rank	Result	Rank
Olivia Fotopoulou	100 metres	DQ	–	did not advance			
Natalia Evangelidou	800 metres	2.03.38	7	did not advance			
Natalia Evangelidou	1500 metres	4.25.91	22	—		did not advance	
Natalia Christofi	100 metres hurdles	13.53	18	did not advance			

Field events

Athletes	Event	Qualification		Final	
Athletes	Event	Distance	Position	Distance	Position
Nektaria Panagi	Long jump	6.62 q	11	6.29	11
