= Una Stancev =

Italian athlete (born 2002)

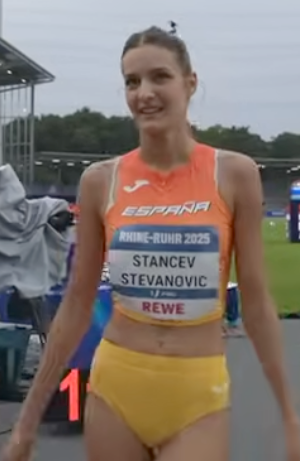
- At the 2025 Summer World University Games

Personal information
- Nationality: Spanish
- Born: Una Stancev Stevanovic; 27 August 2002 (age 23)

Sport
- Sport: Athletics
- Event: High jump

Achievements and titles
- Personal bests: High jump: 1.91 m (Geneva, 2025)
Medal record
Women's athletics
Representing Spain
Summer World University Games
Gold medal – first place	2025 Bochum	High jump

Una Stancev Stevanovic (born 27 August 2002) is a Spanish high jumper. She is a multiple-time winner of the Spanish Athletics Championships and the gold medalist at the University Games in 2025.

== Early life ==
She was born in Serbia, but moved to Spain when she was less than a year-old when her family fled the Balkan conflict. Her father worked as a university sports professor and her mother as a scientist in Serbia. They settled in La Herradura, in the province of Granada, Andalucía. She is a member of Trops-Cueva de Nerja athletics club and started training in high jump from the age of 14 years-old.

== Career ==
She won the Spanish Under-18 Championships in 2019. The following year, she won the Andalusian Under-20 Championships, achieving a height of 1.73 metres.

She won the senior Spanish Athletics Championships in 2022 for the first time, in Nerja, sigh a jump of 1.85 metres. She cleared 1.81 metres to win the Spanish Indoor Athletics Championships in Madrid in February 2023. She defended her national title at the 2023 Spanish Championships, with a personal best 1.86 metres, an Andalusian record. She won Spanish Indoor Athletics Championships again in February 2024 with a jump of 1.84 metres. She cleared 1.87 metres to win the Spanish outdoor title in June 2024.

She jumped a personal best clearance of 1.91 metres in Geneva, Switzerland in June 2025, which moved her to on the Spanish all-time in the event, behind Marta Mendía and Ruth Beitia. She became the first Spanish athlete to win gold in high jump at the World University Games when she won the gold the 2025 Summer World University Games in Bochum, Germany, equalling her personal best of 1.91 metres to finish ahead of Italian Asia Tavernini and Elena Kulichenko, representing Cyprus. She cleared 1.89 metres to win the Spanish Championships title Tarragona in August 2025.

Stancev cleared 1.86 metres to win the 2026 Spanish Indoor Championships in Valencia. In August 2026, she competed at the 2026 European Athletics Championships in Birmingham, England.
