= Cyprus at the 2024 European Athletics Championships =

- Flag of Cyprus
- WA code: CYP

in Rome, Italy 7 June 2024 – 12 June 2022
- Competitors: 8 (4 men and 4 women)

European Athletics Championships appearances
- 1974; 1978; 1982; 1986; 1990; 1994; 1998; 2002; 2006; 2010; 2012; 2014; 2016; 2018; 2022; 2024

Cyprus competed at the 2024 European Athletics Championships in Rome, Italy from 7–12 June 2024.

== Medallists ==
Medal	Name	Event	Date

== Results ==
Cyprus entered the following athletes.

Key

- Q = Qualified for the next round
- q = Qualified for the next round as a fastest loser or, in field events, by position without achieving the qualifying target
- NR = National record
- PB = Personal best
- SB = Season best
- N/A = Round not applicable for the event

=== Men ===
Track and road events

Athlete	Event	Heat		Semifinal		Final	
Athlete	Event	Result	Rank	Result	Rank	Result	Rank
Amine Khadiri	Half marathon	—				DNS	
Milan Trajkovic	110 metres hurdles	Bye		13.47	9	Did not advance	

Field events

Athlete	Event	Qualification		Final	
Athlete	Event	Distance	Position	Distance	Position
Vasilios Konstantinou	High jump	2.17 SB	14	Did not advance	
Apostolos Parellis	Discus throw	62.13	11 q	62.53	9

=== Women ===
Track and road events

Athlete	Event	Heat		Semifinal		Final	
Athlete	Event	Result	Rank	Result	Rank	Result	Rank
Olivia Fotopoulou	100 metres	11.27 SB	6 q	11.40	20	Did not advance	
Olivia Fotopoulou	200 metres	Bye		22.92 SB	10	Did not advance	
Natalia Christofi	100 metres hurdles	Bye		13.20	23	Did not advance	

Field events

Athlete	Event	Qualification		Final	
Athlete	Event	Distance	Position	Distance	Position
Filippa Kviten	Long jump	6.63 SB	12 q	6.58	11
Valentina Savva	Hammer throw	66.58	21	Did not advance	
