= 2026 European Athletics Championships – Women's high jump =

Women's high jump at the 2026 European Athletics Championships
- Venue: Alexander Stadium
- Location: Birmingham, United Kingdom
- Dates: 13 August 2026 (qualification); 15 August 2026 (final)
- Competitors: 30 (target)
- Winning height: 1.97 m

Medalists
gold medal	Yaroslava Mahuchikh	Ukraine
silver medal	Maria Żodzik	Poland
bronze medal	Marija Vuković	Montenegro

The women's high jump at the 2026 European Athletics Championships took place over two rounds at the Alexander Stadium in Birmingham, United Kingdom, on 13 and 15 August 2026.

== Background ==
Records before the 2026 European Athletics Championships
Record	Athlete (nation)	Height	Location	Date
World record	Yaroslava Mahuchikh (UKR)	2.10 m	Paris, France	7 July 2024
European record	Yaroslava Mahuchikh (UKR)	2.10 m	Paris, France	7 July 2024
World leading	Yaroslava Mahuchikh (UKR)	2.03 m	Lviv, Ukraine	17 January 2026
European leading	Yaroslava Mahuchikh (UKR)	2.03 m	Lviv, Ukraine	17 January 2026
Championship record	Tia Hellebaut (BEL)	2.03 m	Gothenburg, Sweden	11 August 2006
Championship record	Venelina Veneva-Mateeva (BUL)	2.03 m	Gothenburg, Sweden	11 August 2006
Championship record	Blanka Vlašić (CRO)	2.03 m	Barcelona, Spain	1 August 2010

== Qualification ==
For the women's high jump, the qualification period was from 27 July 2025 to 26 July 2026. Athletes qualified by achieving the entry standard of 1.94 m or better, by wildcard for the 2024 European Athletics Champion, or by their position on the World Athletics Rankings for the event. The target number was 30 athletes.

Qualification standings per 31 July 2026
QP	CP	Country	Athlete	Status	Details
1	1	Ukraine	Yaroslava Mahuchikh	Qualified by Wild Card	Defending European Champion
2	1	Germany	Christina Honsel	Qualified by Entry Standard	2.00 - Marktplatz, Heilbronn (GER) - 09 AUG 2025
3	1	Great Britain & N.I.	Morgan Lake	Qualified by Entry Standard	2.00 - Sechseläutenplatz, Zürich (SUI) - 27 AUG 2025
4	1	Poland	Maria Żodzik	Qualified by Entry Standard	2.00 - National Stadium, Tokyo (JPN) - 21 SEP 2025
5	1	Serbia	Angelina Topić	Qualified by Entry Standard	2.00 - Športová hala Dukla, Banská Bystrica (SVK) (i) - 24 FEB 2026
6	1	Montenegro	Marija Vuković	Qualified by Entry Standard	1.98 - Filothei Stadium, Athina (GRE) - 03 JUN 2026
7	1	Belgium	Merel Maes	Qualified by Entry Standard	1.97 - Boudewijnstadion, Bruxelles (BEL) - 02 AUG 2025
8	2	Ukraine	Iryna Herashchenko	Qualified by Entry Standard	1.97 - Egret Stadium, Xiamen (CHN) - 23 MAY 2026
9	1	Sweden	Louise Ekman	Qualified by Entry Standard	1.96 - Športová hala Dukla, Banská Bystrica (SVK) (i) - 24 FEB 2026
10	1	Czech Republic	Michaela Hrubá	Qualified by Entry Standard	1.94 - Marktplatz, Heilbronn (GER) - 09 AUG 2025
11	1	France	Solène Gicquel	Qualified by World Rankings	11th - 1189 points
12	1	Cyprus	Elena Kulichenko	Qualified by World Rankings	13th - 1184 points
13	1	Finland	Ella Junnila	Qualified by World Rankings	15th - 1177 points
14	1	Slovenia	Lia Apostolovski	Qualified by World Rankings	16th - 1168 points
15	1	Hungary	Lilianna Bátori	Qualified by World Rankings	18th - 1167 points
16	1	Italy	Idea Pieroni	Qualified by World Rankings	21st - 1147 points
17	1	Spain	Una Stancev	Qualified by World Rankings	22nd - 1146 points
18	2	Sweden	Engla Nilsson	Qualified by World Rankings	25th - 1143 points
19	2	Germany	Dorothea Gantert	Qualified by World Rankings	26th - 1138 points
20	2	Poland	Wiktoria Miąso	Qualified by World Rankings	29th - 1132 points
21	1	Greece	Panagiota Dosi	Qualified by World Rankings	33rd - 1123 points
22	2	Italy	Asia Tavernini	Qualified by World Rankings	35th - 1122 points
23	2	Cyprus	Styliana Ioannidou	Qualified by World Rankings	36th - 1120 points
24	3	Sweden	Ellen Ekholm	Qualified by World Rankings	37th - 1115 points
25	3	Poland	Maja Słodzińska	Qualified by World Rankings	38th - 1115 points
26	3	Italy	Marta Morara	Qualified by World Rankings	40th - 1110 points
27	2	Slovenia	Ela Velepec	Qualified by World Rankings	41st - 1109 points
28	3	Germany	Anna-Elisabeth Ehlers	Qualified by World Rankings	43rd - 1108 points
29	1	Estonia	Karmen Bruus	Qualified by World Rankings	52nd - 1096 points
30	1	Turkey	Berra Aygün	Qualified by World Rankings	58th - 1087 points
reserve	4	Italy	Aurora Vicini	Next best by World Rankings	59th - 1082 points
reserve	1	Bulgaria	Annie Stapleton	Next best by World Rankings	63rd - 1074 points
reserve	2	Hungary	Fédra Fekete	Next best by World Rankings	69th - 1070 points

== Schedule ==
Date	Time	Round
13 August 2026	10:55	Qualification.
15 August 2026	20:07	Final

All times are local times (UTC+1)

== Results ==
=== Qualification ===
The qualification round was held on 11 August 2026, at 10:43 in the morning. All athletes meeting the Qualification Standard (Q) of 1.91 m or at least 12 best performers (q) advanced to the final.

==== Group A ====
Place	Athlete	Nation	1.75	1.80	1.84	1.88	1.91	Result	Notes
1	Louise Ekman	Sweden	o	o	o	o	o	1.91 m	Q
1	Yaroslava Mahuchikh	Ukraine	−	−	−	o	o	1.91 m	Q
1	Marija Vuković	Montenegro	−	−	o	o	o	1.91 m	Q
4	Karmen Bruus	Estonia	o	o	o	o	xo	1.91 m	Q
4	Asia Tavernini	Italy	o	o	o	o	xo	1.91 m	Q
6	Solène Gicquel	France	−	o	o	o	xxo	1.91 m	Q
7	Morgan Lake	Great Britain & N.I.	−	o	o	xo	xxo	1.91 m	Q
8	Lia Apostolovski	Slovenia	o	o	o	o	xxx	1.88 m	
8	Marta Morara	Italy	o	o	o	o	xxx	1.88 m	
10	Wiktoria Miąso	Poland	o	o	o	xo	xxx	1.88 m	
11	Lilianna Bátori	Hungary	−	o	xo	xxo	xxx	1.88 m	
12	Anna-Elisabeth Ehlers	Germany	o	o	o	xxx		1.84 m	
12	Michaela Hrubá	Czech Republic	o	o	o	xxx		1.84 m	
14	Berra Aygün	Turkey	o	o	xxx			1.80 m	
14	Styliana Ioannidou	Cyprus	o	o	xxx			1.80 m	

==== Group B ====
Place	Athlete	Nation	1.75	1.80	1.84	1.88	1.91	Result	Notes
1	Iryna Herashchenko	Ukraine	−	o	o	o	o	1.91 m	Q
1	Christina Honsel	Germany	−	o	o	o	o	1.91 m	Q
1	Elena Kulichenko	Cyprus	−	o	o	o	o	1.91 m	Q, =SB
1	Angelina Topić	Serbia	−	o	o	o	o	1.91 m	Q
1	Maria Żodzik	Poland	−	o	o	o	o	1.91 m	Q
6	Merel Maes	Belgium	o	o	o	o	xo	1.91 m	Q, SB
7	Ella Junnila	Finland	o	xo	o	o	xo	1.91 m	Q, =SB
8	Idea Pieroni	Italy	o	o	o	o	xxo	1.91 m	Q, SB
9	Una Stancev	Spain	o	o	o	o	xxx	1.88 m	
10	Ellen Ekholm	Sweden	o	o	xo	o	xxx	1.88 m	
11	Panagiota Dosi	Greece	o	xxo	o	xxx		1.84 m	
12	Dorothea Gantert	Germany	o	o	xo	xxx		1.84 m	
13	Engla Nilsson	Sweden	o	o	xxo	xxx		1.84 m	
14	Ela Velepec	Slovenia	o	xo	xxo	xxx		1.84 m	
15	Maja Słodzińska	Poland	o	o	xxx			1.80 m	

=== Final ===
The final was held on 15 August 2026, at 20:07 in the evening.

Place	Athlete	Nation	1.83	1.88	1.92	1.95	1.97	1.99	2.01	Result	Notes
1st place, gold medalist(s)	Yaroslava Mahuchikh	Ukraine	−	−	o	xo	o	-	xxx	1.97 m	
2nd place, silver medalist(s)	Maria Żodzik	Poland	xxo	o	xo	o	xxx			1.95 m	
3rd place, bronze medalist(s)	Marija Vuković	Montenegro	o	o	xo	xo	xxx			1.95 m	
4	Christina Honsel	Germany	o	xxo	o	xxx				1.92 m	
5	Iryna Herashchenko	Ukraine	o	xo	xxo	xxx				1.92 m	
6	Louise Ekman	Sweden	o	o	xxx					1.88 m	
7	Asia Tavernini	Italy	xxo	o	xxx					1.88 m	
8	Solène Gicquel	France	o	xo	xxx					1.88 m	
8	Morgan Lake	Great Britain & N.I.	o	xo	xxx					1.88 m	
10	Ella Junnila	Finland	o	xxo	xxx					1.88 m	
10	Elena Kulichenko	Cyprus	o	xxo	xxx					1.88 m	
12	Angelina Topić	Serbia	o	xxx						1.83 m	
13	Karmen Bruus	Estonia	xxo	xxx						1.83 m	
13	Merel Maes	Belgium	xxo	xxx						1.83 m	
13	Idea Pieroni	Italy	xxo	xxx						1.83 m	
