= 2021 World Athletics U20 Championships – Women's high jump =

Women's high jump at the 2021 World Athletics U20 Championships
- Venue: Ratina Stadium
- Dates: 20 August (qualification); 22 August (final)
- Competitors: 17 from 12 nations
- Winning height: 1.91 m

Medalists
gold medal	Natalya Spiridonova	Authorised Neutral Athletes
silver medal	Marithé-Thérèse Engondo	Switzerland
bronze medal	Styliana Ioannidou	Cyprus

The women's high jump at the 2021 World Athletics U20 Championships was held at the Kasarani Stadium on 20 and 22 August.

== Records ==
Standing records prior to the 2021 World Athletics U20 Championships
World U20 Record	Olga Turchak (URS)	2.01	Moscow, Soviet Union	7 July 1986
World U20 Record	Heike Balck (GDR)	2.01	Karl-Marx-Stadt, East Germany	18 June 1989
Championship Record	Alina Astafei (ROM)	2.00	Sudbury, Canada	29 July 1988
World U20 Leading	Mariya Kochanova (ANA)	1.94	Cheboksary, Russia	26 June 2021

== Results ==
=== Qualification ===
The qualification round took place on 20 August, in two groups, both starting at 10:15. Athletes attaining a mark of at least 1.85 metres ( Q ) or at least the 12 best performers ( q ) qualified for the final.

Rank	Group	Name	Nationality	1.64	1.69	1.74	1.78	Result	Note
1	B	Adelina Khalikova	Authorised Neutral Athletes	–	o	o	o	1.78	q
1	B	Elisabeth Pihela	Estonia	–	–	–	o	1.78	q
1	A	Idea Pieroni	Italy	–	o	o	o	1.78	q
1	A	Natalya Spiridonova	Authorised Neutral Athletes	–	–	o	o	1.78	q
1	A	Styliana Ioannidou	Cyprus	–	o	o	o	1.78	q
1	A	Zorana Rokavec	Serbia	o	o	o	o	1.78	q
7	B	Laureen Maxwell	France	–	–	xo	o	1.78	q
7	B	Marithé-Thérèse Engondo	Switzerland	–	xo	o	o	1.78	q
9	B	Alesia Rengle	Romania	o	o	o	xo	1.78	q
9	B	Angelina Topić	Serbia	–	o	o	xo	1.78	q
11	B	Rebecca Mihalescul	Italy	–	o	xo	xo	1.78	q
12	A	Federica Apostol	Romania	o	o	o	xxx	1.74	q
12	A	Merel Maes	Belgium	–	o	o	xxx	1.74	q
14	A	Lāsma Zemīte	Latvia	–	o	xo	xxx	1.74	
15	B	Mariya Aleynikova	Ukraine	–	o	xxo	xxx	1.74	
15	A	Veronika Kramarenko	Ukraine	–	o	xxo	xxx	1.74	
17	A	Zeddy Jesire Chongwo	Kenya	o	xxx			1.64	

=== Final ===
The final was held on 22 August at 15:25.

Rank	Name	Nationality	1.75	1.80	1.84	1.87	1.89	1.91	1.93	1.94	Result	Note
1st place, gold medalist(s)	Natalya Spiridonova	Authorised Neutral Athletes	o	o	xxo	xo	xxo	o	x-	xx	1.91	PB
2nd place, silver medalist(s)	Marithé-Thérèse Engondo	Switzerland	o	xo	o	xo	o	x-	xx		1.89	NU20R
3rd place, bronze medalist(s)	Styliana Ioannidou	Cyprus	o	o	o	o	xxx				1.87	NU20R
4	Elisabeth Pihela	Estonia	o	xo	xo	xxo	xxx				1.87	PB
5	Merel Maes	Belgium	o	o	o	xxx					1.84	
6	Angelina Topić	Serbia	o	xo	o	xxx					1.84	
7	Federica Apostol	Romania	xo	xxo	o	xxx					1.84	PB
8	Adelina Khalikova	Authorised Neutral Athletes	o	xo	xo	xxx					1.84	
9	Idea Pieroni	Italy	o	o	xxx						1.80	
9	Zorana Rokavec	Serbia	o	o	xxx						1.80	
11	Rebecca Mihalescul	Italy	xo	xxo	xxx						1.80	
12	Laureen Maxwell	France	xo	xxx							1.75	
12	Alesia Rengle	Romania	xo	xxx							1.75	
