= Cyprus at the 1978 European Athletics Championships =

- WA code: CYP

in Prague
- Competitors: 1
- Medals: Gold 0 Silver 0 Bronze 0 Total 0

European Athletics Championships appearances
- 1974; 1978; 1982; 1986; 1990; 1994; 1998; 2002; 2006; 2010; 2012; 2014; 2016; 2018; 2022; 2024

Cyprus sent one athlete to the 1978 European Athletics Championships which took place 29 August–3 September 1978 in Prague. Cyprus won no medals at the Championships.
