= Athletics at the 2025 Summer World University Games – Women's high jump =

Women's high jump at the 2025 Summer World University Games
- Venue: Lohrheidestadion
- Location: Bochum, Germany
- Dates: 25 July (qualification); 26 July (final)
- Competitors: 24 from 21 nations
- Winning distance: 1.91 m =PB

Medalists
gold medal	Una Stancev	Spain
silver medal	Asia Tavernini	Italy
bronze medal	Elena Kulichenko	Cyprus

The women's high jump event at the 2025 Summer World University Games was held in Bochum, Germany, at Lohrheidestadion on 25 and 26 July.

== Records ==
Prior to the competition, the records were as follows:

Record	Athlete (nation)	Distance (m)	Location	Date
Games record	Silvia Costa (CUB)	69.82 m	Kobe, Japan	3 September 1985

== Results ==
=== Qualification ===
All athletes over 1.88 m (Q) or at least the 12 best performers (q) advance to the final.

==== Group A ====
Place	Athlete	Nation	1.61	1.66	1.71	1.76	1.81	Result	Notes
1	Elena Kulichenko	Cyprus	-	-	-	-	o	1.81 m	q
1	Una Stancev	Spain	-	-	-	o	o	1.81 m	q
1	Asia Tavernini	Italy	-	-	-	o	o	1.81 m	q
1	Madison Schmidt	United States	-	-	-	o	o	1.81 m	q
1	Kristina Ovchinnikova	Kazakhstan	-	-	o	o	o	1.81 m	q
6	Alexandra Harrison	Australia	-	-	-	o	o	1.81 m	q
7	Halle Ferguson	Great Britain	-	o	o	xo	xxo	1.76 m	
8	Lara Denbow	Canada	-	o	o	xxx	xxx	1.71 m	
9	Ching Lam Cheung	Hong Kong	-	xo	xxo	xxx		1.71 m	
10	Kathrine Fjerbæk Olsen	Denmark	o	xxo	xxo	xxx		1.71 m	
—	Mayerly Rubi Chalan	Ecuador	xxx					NM	
—	Cheng Man Leong	Macau	xxx					NM	

==== Group B ====
Place	Athlete	Nation	1.61	1.66	1.71	1.76	1.81	Result	Notes
1	Styliana Ioannidou	Cyprus	-	-	o	o	o	1.81 m	q
1	Bianca Stichling	Germany	-	-	o	o	o	1.81 m	q
3	Kristi Snyman	South Africa	-	-	o	o	xo	1.81 m	q
3	Patrīcija Jansone	Latvia	-	-	o	o	xo	1.81 m	q
5	Ela Velepec	Slovenia	-	-	o	xo	xo	1.81 m	q
5	Luca Keszthelyi	Hungary	-	o	o	xo	xo	1.81 m	q, SB
5	Karmen Bruus	Estonia	-	o	o	xo	xo	1.81 m	q
8	Claudina Díaz	Mexico	-	o	o	xxx		1.71 m	
8	Celia Markovinovic	Canada	o	o	o	xxx		1.71 m	
10	Pallavi S. Patil	India	xo	xxo	xxo	xxx		1.71 m	
11	Mónica Montero	Chile	o	xxo	xxx			1.66 m	
—	Yelizaveta Matveyeva	Kazakhstan	-	-	-	xr		NM	

=== Final ===
Place	Athlete	Nation	1.71	1.76	1.81	1.84	1.87	1.89	1.91	1.93	Result	Notes
1st place, gold medalist(s)	Una Stancev	Spain	-	o	o	o	o	o	xo	xxx	1.91 m	=PB
2nd place, silver medalist(s)	Asia Tavernini	Italy	-	o	o	o	xxo	xo	xx-	x	1.89 m	
3rd place, bronze medalist(s)	Elena Kulichenko	Cyprus	-	-	o	o	o	xxx			1.87 m	
4	Styliana Ioannidou	Cyprus	o	o	o	xxo	xxx				1.84 m	
4	Kristi Snyman	South Africa	o	o	o	xxo	xxx				1.84 m	
6	Alexandra Harrison	Australia	-	o	o	xxx					1.81 m	
7	Patrīcija Jansone	Latvia	o	o	xo	xxx					1.81 m	
8	Bianca Stichling	Germany	o	o	xxo	xxx					1.81 m	
9	Kristina Ovchinnikova	Kazakhstan	o	o	xxx						1.76 m	
10	Ela Velepec	Slovenia	xo	o	xxx						1.76 m	
11	Karmen Bruus	Estonia	o	xo	xxx						1.76 m	
11	Madison Schmidt	United States	-	xo	xxx						1.76 m	
—	Luca Keszthelyi	Hungary	xxx								NM	
