= Cyprus Papers =

2020 leak of Cypriot government passport program by Al Jazeera

The Cyprus Papers was a leak of government documents related to the Cyprus Investment Program (CIP) obtained by Al Jazeera and released in August 2020. The CIP allows non-citizens to apply and obtain a Cypriot passport by investing at least 2 million Euros in Cyprus. The passports obtained through the CIP are nicknamed "Golden Passports".

Al Jazeera conducted an investigation based on the leaked papers and allegedly found that the Republic of Cyprus provided citizenship through the CIP to several people linked to crime and corruption.

On the 12th of October 2020, Al Jazeera released a video of an under-cover investigation related to the Cyprus Papers. In the video, Al Jazeera reveals how Cypriot lawyers, business people and top-tier politicians are willing to aid and abet convicted criminals to obtain Cypriot citizenship, granting the criminals access to the European Union's internal markets and visa-free travel. People appeared in the video included, among others, Cyprus Speaker of the House of Representatives Demetris Syllouris, Member of Parliament Christakis Giovanis, lawyer Andreas G. Pittadjis and Antonis Antoniou property executive of Giovannis Group. Notably in the video, Demetris Syllouris meets with Al Jazeera's under-cover journalists posing as representatives of an actually non-existing Chinese businessman and convicted money-launderer who seeks to obtain a Cyprus passport via the CIP. In the video footage, Syllouris promises to give his support so that the Chinese businessman receives Cypriot citizenship, even though providing citizenship to convicted criminals is against the requirements of CIP and the Cypriot law.

In response to Al Jazeera's accusations, Syllouris claimed that he was actually playing along with the rest of the people shown in the video to gather more information about the criminal Chinese businessman and to finally report the case to the Cyprus authorities.

Al Jazeera's video sparked protests in the capital of Cyprus, Nicosia. The protesters demanded a full, prompt and transparent investigation and the immediate resignation of President of the House of Representatives Demetris Syllouris and Member of Parliament Christakis Giovanis. As a result, both Demetris Syllouris and Christakis Giovanis resigned from their posts. Furthermore, the Cyprus government announce that it would abolish the CIP from November 2020. In September 2022, the four men that appeared in the Al Jazeera video, were ordered to stand for trial in the criminal court of Nicosia. In October 2023 Andreas G. Pittadjis was cleared from all charges by Cypriot courts.
