= 2026 African Championships in Athletics – Women's high jump =

Women's high jump at the 2026 African Championships in Athletics
- Venue: Legon Sports Stadium
- Location: Accra, Ghana
- Dates: 14 May
- Competitors: 8 from 6 nations
- Winning time: 1.84

Medalists
gold medal	Kristi Snyman	South Africa
silver medal	Esther Obenewaa	Ghana
bronze medal	Betselot Alemayehu	Ethiopia

The women's high jump event at the 2026 African Championships in Athletics was held on 14 May in Accra, Ghana.

== Results ==
Rank	Athlete	Nation	Result	Remark
1st place, gold medalist(s)	Kristi Snyman	South Africa	1.84	
2nd place, silver medalist(s)	Esther Obenewaa	Ghana	1.81	
3rd place, bronze medalist(s)	Betselot Alemayehu	Ethiopia	1.75	
4	Clergy Edet	Nigeria	1.70	
4	Treasure Omosivwe	Nigeria	1.70	
4	Faith Jepkemboi Kipsang	Kenya	1.70	
4	Sara Nyningiew	Ethiopia	1.70	
8	Goitseone Joel	Botswana	1.65	
