= Dacsy Brisón =

Cuban high jumper (born 2002)

Dacsy Adelina Brisón
Personal information
- Born: 26 October 2002 (age 23)

Sport
- Sport: Athletics
- Event: High jump

Achievements and titles
- Personal best: High jump: 1.93 m (2025)
Medal record
Women's athletics
Representing Cuba
NACAC Championships
| Bronze medal – third place | 2025 Freeport | High jump |

Dacsy Adelina Brisón (born 26 October 2002) is a Cuban high jumper. She won the bronze medal at the 2025 NACAC Championships and competed at the 2025 World Athletics Championships.

== Career ==
She cleared a height of 1.90 metre for the first time in February 2025. She then set a new personal best of 1.91 metres competing in June 2025 at the Barrientos Athletics Championships. She won the Cuban Championships later that month, with a new personal best clearance of 1.93 metres.

She won the bronze medal competing for Cuba at the 2025 NACAC Championships in Freeport, The Bahamas finishing behind Sanaa Barnes and Vashti Cunningham of the United States with a jump of 1.88 metres.

She competed at the 2025 World Athletics Championships in Tokyo, Japan, in September 2025, clearing 1.88 metres without advancing to the final.
