= Asia Tavernini =

Italian athlete (born 2002)

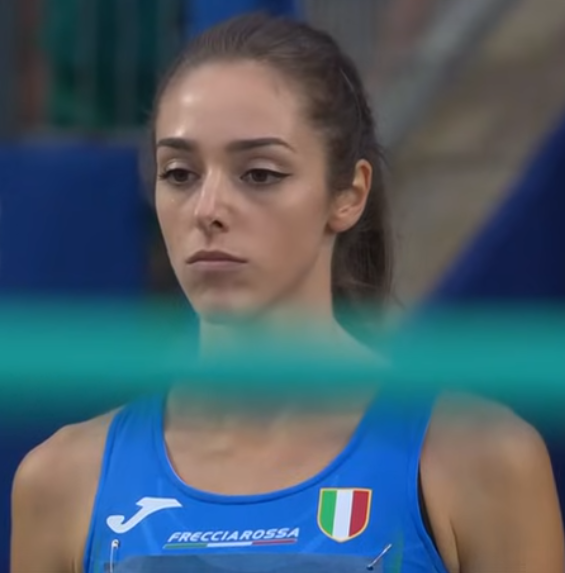
- At the 2025 Summer World University Games

Personal information
- Nationality: Italian
- Born: 18 September 2001 (age 24)

Sport
- Sport: Athletics
- Event: High jump

Achievements and titles
- Personal bests: High jump: 1.92 m (Brescia, 2025)
Medal record
Women's athletics
Representing Italy
Summer World University Games
Silver medal – second place	2025 Bochum	High jump

Asia Tavernini (born 18 September 2001) is an Italian high jumper. She won the Italian Athletics Championships in 2025.

== Biography ==
From Riva del Garda, in the province of Trento in the Trentino Alto Adige region, she is a member of US Quercia Dao Conad and a member of the Fiamme Oro.

She is coached by Silvano Chesani. In 2024, she jumped 1.90 metres for the first time whilst competing in Arco, Trentino. She was runner-up on countback to Idea Pieroni in the high jump competition at the 2024 Italian Athletics Championships in La Spezia, in June 2024, with both athletes clearing 1.88 metres.

She jumped a personal best clearance of 1.92 metres in Brescia in June 2025. She won the silver medal at the 2025 Summer World University Games in Bochum, Germany in the women's high jump, the following month. She won the Italian Athletics Championships in August 2025 with a jump of 1.87 metres in Caorle.

She competed at the 2025 World Athletics Championships in Tokyo, Japan, in September 2025, clearing 1.83 metres without advancing to the final.

In August 2026, she competed at the 2026 European Athletics Championships in Birmingham, England, placing seventh overall.
