= Cyprus Investment Programme =

Cypriot government citizenship programme

The Cyprus Investment Programme (CIP; Greek: Κυπριακό Επενδυτικό Πρόγραμμα, ΚΕΠ) was an immigrant investor programme conceived by the Government of Cyprus in order to attract foreign investors in exchange for Cyprus citizenship. Details of the scheme were made public after a leak of documents, the Cyprus Papers, to Al Jazeera which caused a controversy in Cyprus and led to the end of the programme in 2020. Subsequently the "golden passport" programme has been replaced by the "golden visa" programme.

== Background ==
The programme was initiated in 2007. From 2007 to 1 November 2020, just over 7,000 people received Cypriot citizenship. The minimum investment was 2 million euros and citizenship was extended to the family of the investor as well. In 2013, the required minimum investment for citizenship was lowered from 25 million in 2007 to 2.5 million. Applicants did not need to physically stay in Cyprus or pass a language test to acquire citizenship.

== Corruption and investigations ==
One of the reasons for citizenship by investment is tax evasion and visa-free travel.

An independent inquiry committee (Nikolatou Report) later found that 53% of the passports were illegally issued. On 22 August 2022 a report by the Audit Office of Cyprus revealed that the Ministry of the Interior did not disclose required information about applicants to the Council of Ministers, and that the improper granting of citizenship had resulted in recorded losses of €200 million in taxes and €25 million in non-collection of fees. Furthermore, investment contracts worth €1 billion had been cancelled, while contracts worth €3.5 billion had not yet materialized. Additionally, the Audit Office Report revealed that a number of investors who bought property in order to gain citizenship were leasing the properties to third persons, something that was against the terms of the Cyprus Investment Programme.

Another irregularity discovered by the Audit Office was the application of a reduced VAT rate, a social measure stipulated by an EU Directive, which lowered the rate from 19% to 5% to first time owners of a house in order to help people struggling financially. The reduced rate was given to investors even though they could not qualify for it, there was even a case when a €14.5 million apartment in a tower was granted the social measure of lower VAT rate. This abuse benefited 1,298 investors that bought property amounting to €1.6 billion and the total losses in uncollected taxes were at least €204 million. The violation by Cyprus of EU Directive 2006/112/EC will be investigated by the European Commission.

In July 2021, the European Commission sent a letter of formal notice to Cyprus for its failure to properly apply EU VAT rules for dwellings, giving Cyprus two months to take "appropriate steps." The inspector of taxes in 2020, Giannis Tsagaris, stated that if the European directive concerning VAT for the acquisition of housing is applied incorrectly, Cyprus will be asked to pay lost income from own resources, to cover the difference between reduced and normal VAT rate saved by investors. Based on information available in 2020 investors paid €125 million in VAT while at the standard rate of 19%, they would have paid four times the amount, leaving ordinary taxpayers to pay the €375 million deficit.

In May 2026, the Nicosia district court froze a property in Parekklisia owned by Bangladeshi businessman Mohammed Saiful Alam and his wife, following a request from Bangladeshi authorities investigating an alleged €8 billion money‑laundering operation. Alam, who obtained Cypriot citizenship through the investment programme in 2016, denies any wrongdoing.

In a separate but related development, Bangladesh's Anti‑Corruption Commission filed its largest‑ever case in November 2025 against Alam, his wife, five brothers, and 60 others, alleging the embezzlement of Tk10,479.62 crore (approximately $1 billion) from Islami Bank and the laundering of funds to Singapore, the British Virgin Islands, and Cyprus. S Alam applies again to renounce Bangladeshi citizenship, having previously attempted to do so in 2020 after obtaining a Cypriot passport, while also claiming Singaporean citizenship acquired between 2021 and 2023.

== Court cases ==
Up to 2024 four court cases have been filled in Cypriot courts.

On 12 September 2022, former House of Representatives president Demetris Syllouris, former AKEL MP and real estate developer Christakis Giovani, as well as lawyer Andreas Pittadjis, and Antonis Antoniou, the executive director of the Giovani Group were brought before the court, facing five counts on two charges - conspiracy to defraud the state, and influencing a public official in violation of the law recognizing the Council of Europe Convention on the Criminalization of Corruption. On 11 October 2023 all charges against Pittadjis were dropped. In August 2024, Syllouris, Giovani and Pittadjis, brought a libel suit against Al Jazeera asking for $2 million each.

The fourth case includes ten defendants, one of them is the former Minister of Transport, Communications, and Works, Marios Demetriades. The defendants face 59 charges, including conspiracy to defraud and corruption. The evidence collected includes 200 box files, underscoring the extensive investigative work involved. The trial is set to begin on 30 October 2024.

== Effects on the local population ==
The influx of foreign investors has created a number of problems for the local communities that are priced out from rentals as well as gentrification. Russians have been the top foreign buyers of Cypriot properties. Other studies have shown that there are detrimental effects on the local landscape and environment due to the increase demand of buildings to be sold to foreign investors and especially an increase in inequality between the locals and the rich investors. According to the 2022 Eurobarometer, 94% of the 505 Cypriots surveyed believed corruption to be a widespread problem in the country.

After the imposition of sanctions on mainly Russian companies in the Republic of Cyprus, many investors have moved to the occupied northern part of the island, where there is a growing presence of Russians, 39,000 according to estimates, and Iranians. The area of Trikomo has been especially built up with luxury hotels, apartments and casinos for a foreign clientele including Russians and Israelis, most of the land belongs to Greek Cypriots that were displaced during the 1974 Turkish invasion. The unregulated development has also caused environmental damage to the area, such as the dumping of the waste of these developments on the roadside.

== Revocation of passports ==
By January 2023, 222 holders of so-called "golden passports" had had their citizenship stripped. As of October 2023, 233 have been revoked. From March 2023 until September 2025, the Christodoulides government revoked 150 passports, 41 belonging to investors and 109 to their family members, while Decrees of Deprivation of Citizenship were issued for 69 people. In total from 2021 when the CIP programme was terminated until September 2023, 360 passports were revoked, belonging to 101 investors and 259 to their family members.

After the Russian invasion of Ukraine, Cyprus revoked the passports of some Russians that were blacklisted in the EU for sanctions. Five "golden passport" holders have been targeted by US sanctions for arms dealing. In December 2023 the US Treasury sanctioned two former Afghan officials for misappropriating millions in U.S. government funds designated for Afghan security forces by selling fuel at inflated prices. Mir Rahman Rahmani, member of parliament and speaker of the House and his son Ajmal Rahmani, also an MP. Ajmal Rahmani received a Cypriot passport in 2014 and Mir Rahman Rahmani in 2017, through FidesCorp, a Cypriot corporate service provider owned by Savvas Poyadjis, an ex son-in-law to Demetris Syllouris.

In 2024 two Asian holders of Cypriot passports, Su Haijin, aged 40 and Wang Dehai, 34, were arrested in Singapore in suspicion of money laundering 2.2 billion dollars, it has been the biggest money laundering case in the history of the country. The Cypriot Ministry of Interior announced that its following the case and will revoke the passports if the holders are shown to have violated the citizenship conditions. Cypriot passport holder Su Haijin admitted to one charge of resisting arrest and two money laundering charges, and has been sentenced to 14 months in jail. He has subsequently been deported to Cambodia. Wang Dehai, also pleaded guilty, he is originally from China and was handed 16 months in prison and deported to the UK.

In September 2025, Bulgaria arrested Igor Grechushkin, who holds a Russian and a Cypriot passport, who leased the ship, Moldovan-flagged MV Rhosus, that carried chemicals, ammonium nitrate, to Lebanon which then exploded in the 2020 Beirut explosion, and killed more than 200 people. Grechushkin was arrested in Bulgaria after arriving on a flight from Cyprus.

== Replacement with other programs ==
=== Golden visa programme ===
After the scrapping of the Cyprus Investment Programme in 2020, the Government initiated a golden visa programme. It is a fast-track programme for third country nationals. This programme requires an investment of at least €300,000 plus 19% VAT on newbuilds, in an approved investment category. Until 2023 the Government issued 5,800 golden visas for investors. For the period 2014–2025, golden visas were given to 7,372 people, according to Makis Keravnos, Minister of Finance. The same law firms that previously advertised golden passports are now advertising golden visas.

The Audit Office of Cyprus has cautioned that the system has issues since when they examined the files of 28 investors they discovered that 24 did not have live permanently in Cyprus. The spokesperson of the Audit Office, Marios Petrides, said in an interview that the investors are using the same tactics as previously with CIP, that is, they submitted a document of sale between two parties to the Government, they acquired the golden passport/visa, and then they cancelled the document. He additionally, reminded everyone of the European Commission's recommendations to avoid such programs, due to the inherent risks they entail.

Subsequently, the Audit Office of Cyprus provided the Ministry of Interior with a report on the scheme, advising for corrections and suggesting even it's abolishment. The Ministry commended that they agree on the recommendations for stricter checks but they did not comment on a possible abolishment of the programme. Additionally to the Audit Office, Moneyval, a monitoring body of the Council of Europe, that focuses on money-laundering, also made relevant indications of the risk of abuse that existed due to the weaknesses of the programme.

=== Naturalisation of persons for work in high-skilled employment companies ===
A new programme targeted at third country nationals focuses on people with high-skill job positions was implemented by a new law voted by the Cypriot Parliament in 2024. The target of this legislation is to attract foreign business companies too relocate or create branches in Cyprus. By August 2025 year 208 third country nationals acquired citizenship, as well as 65 members of their families. A further 360 applications are being examined by the Ministry of Interior.

== Investigations ==
=== Cyprus government investigations ===
- Report of the Cyprus Investment Programme by the Audit Office of Cyprus
- Report of the Committee of Investigation of Exceptionally Citizenships to Foreign Investors and Businessmen (Nikolatou Report)

=== Journalist investigations ===
- Reuters, How relatives and allies of Cambodia's leader amassed wealth overseas (16 October 2019).
- Al Jazeera, The Cyprus Papers Undercover.

== See also ==
- Cyprus Papers
- Cyprus Confidential
- Economic citizenship
