= 2025 World Athletics Championships – Women's high jump =

Women's high jump at the 2025 World Athletics Championships
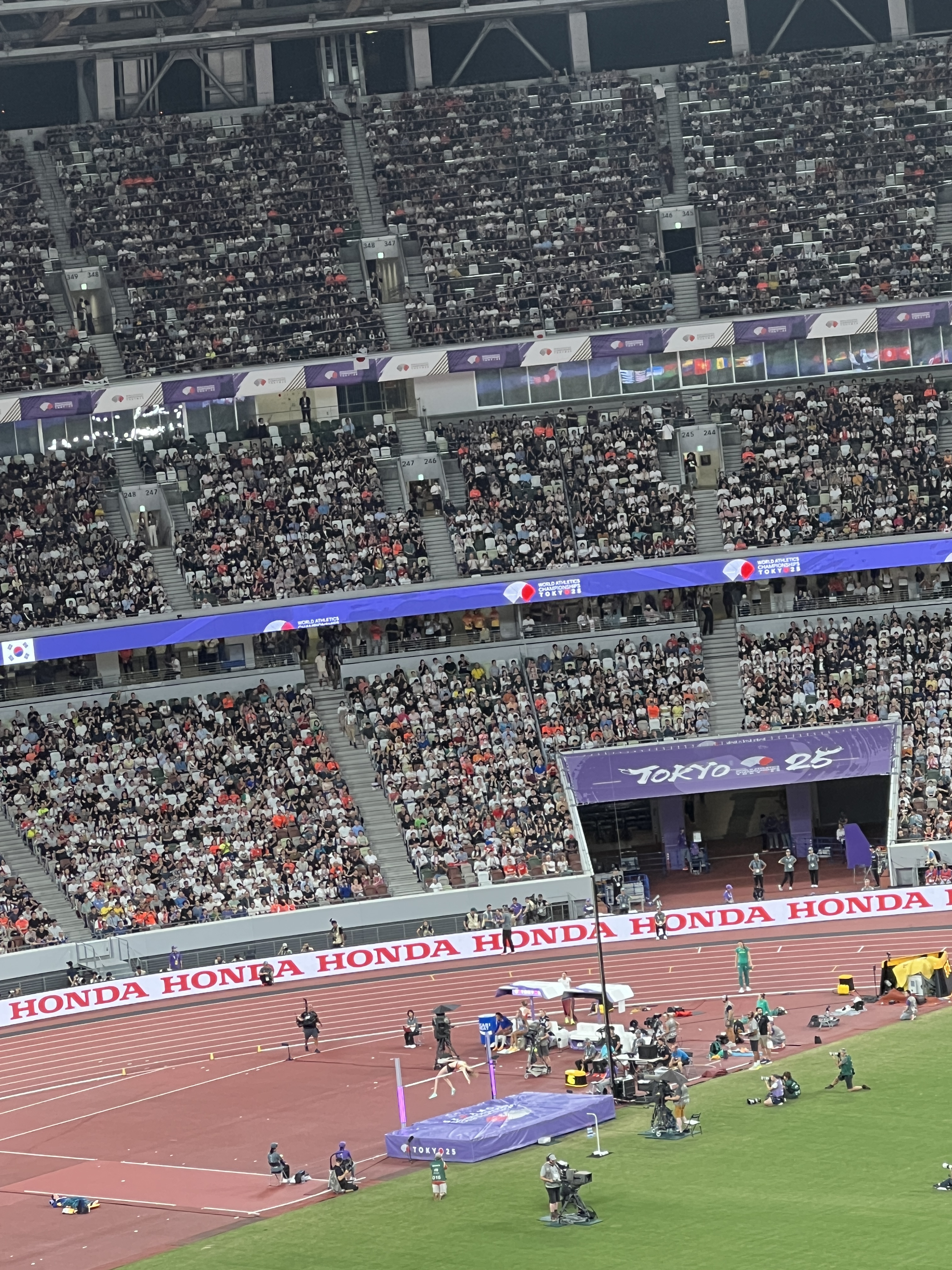
- A competitor at the women's high jump at the 2025 World Athletics
- Venue: National Stadium
- Location: Tokyo, Japan
- Dates: 18 September (qualification); 21 September (final)
- Winning height: 2.00m

Medalists
gold medal	Nicola Olyslagers	Australia
silver medal	Maria Żodzik	Poland
bronze medal	Yaroslava Mahuchikh	Ukraine
bronze medal	Angelina Topić	Serbia

The women's high jump at the 2025 World Athletics Championships was held at the National Stadium in Tokyo on 18 and 21 September 2025.

== Summary ==
Out of a field of 36 athletes, 16 progressed to the final, with the automatic qualifying height of 1.97m unnecessary, with 11 athletes clearing 1.92m and the remaining 5 flawless until 1.92m. All the pre event favourites such as world leader Nicola Olyslagers and world record holder Yaroslava Mahuchikh easily qualified.

The final was marred by rain, with multiple suspensions due to weather, with the competition taking over two and a half hours to complete. Although all but one athlete was able to clear the opening height of 1.87m, an opening miss by Maria Żodzik, threatened to ruin her competition, as she remained otherwise flawless until 2.00m. As the height began to rise, more athletes began to be eliminated, including 2023 silver medalist Eleanor Patterson, with a missed jump at 1.97m, forcing her to have to jump 2.00m to stay in medal contention, although three misses at that height forced her to share 5th place with Ukrainian Yuliya Levchenko. After 1.97m, only three athletes had flawless records, with defending champion Mahuchikh tied with Olyslagers and Serbian Angelina Topić who jumped a seasons best to remain in the hunt, alongside Żodzik whose early miss threatened her chances. After Olyslagers jumped 2.00m, the rain became too heavy to continue, leading to a suspension in the competition.

When it returned, Mahuchikh missed and, now needing 2.02m to take gold, elected to skip 2.00m. Topić was unable to improve on her season best. In a shock, Żodzik set a personal best on her third jump at 2.00m, to keep her in contention for a medal. Two further misses by Mahuchikh at 2.02m ensured she shared Bronze with Topić. Olyslagers and Żodzik swapped misses at the same height, until Olyslagers won her first World Championship on countback, having been flawless until then.

== Records ==
Before the competition records were as follows:

Record	Athlete & Nat.	Perf.	Location	Date
World record	Yaroslava Mahuchikh (UKR)	2.10 m	Paris, France	7 July 2024
Championship record	Stefka Kostadinova (BUL)	2.09 m	Rome, Italy	30 August 1987
World Leading	Nicola Olyslagers (AUS)	2.04 m	Zurich, Switzerland	27 August 2025
African Record	Hestrie Cloete (RSA)	2.06 m	Paris, France	31 August 2003
Asian Record	Nadezhda Dubovitskaya (KAZ)	2.00 m	Almaty, Kazakhstan	8 June 2021
European Record	Yaroslava Mahuchikh (UKR)	2.10 m	Paris, France	7 July 2024
North, Central American and Caribbean record	Chaunte Lowe (USA)	2.05 m	Des Moines, United States	26 June 2010
Oceanian record	Nicola Olyslagers (AUS)	2.04 m	Zurich, Switzerland	27 August 2025
South American Record	Solange Witteveen (ARG)	1.96 m	Oristano, Italy	8 September 1997

== Qualification standard ==
The standard to qualify automatically for entry was 1.97 m.

== Schedule ==
The event schedule, in local time (UTC+9), was as follows:

Date	Time	Round
18 September	19:45	Qualification
21 September	20:00	Final

== Results ==
=== Qualification ===
All athletes over 1.97 m ( Q ) or at least the 12 best performers ( q ) advanced to the final.

==== Group A ====
Place	Athlete	Nation	1.83	1.88	1.92	1.95	1.97	Mark	Notes
1	Morgan Lake	Great Britain & N.I.	-	o	o			1.92 m	q
1	Yaroslava Mahuchikh	Ukraine	-	-	o			1.92 m	q
1	Eleanor Patterson	Australia	-	o	o			1.92 m	q
1	Angelina Topić	Serbia	o	o	o			1.92 m	q
5	Fatoumata Balley	Guinea	o	o	xxx			1.88 m	q
5	Imke Onnen	Germany	o	o	xxx			1.88 m	q
5	Merel Maes	Belgium	o	o	xxx			1.88 m	q
8	Dacsy Adelina Brisón	Cuba	xo	o	xxx			1.88 m	
9	Engla Nilsson	Sweden	o	xo	xxx			1.88 m	
10	Lilianna Bátori	Hungary	xo	xo	xxx			1.88 m	
11	Nagisa Takahashi	Japan	xo	xxo	xxx			1.88 m	
12	Sanaa Barnes	United States	o	xxx				1.83 m	
12	Tatiana Gusin	Greece	o	xxx				1.83 m	
14	Lia Apostolovski	Slovenia	xo	xxx				1.83 m	
15	Idea Pieroni	Italy	xxo	xxx				1.83 m	
—	Ella Junnila	Finland	xxx					NM	
—	Styliana Ioannidou	Cyprus	xxx					NM	
—	Britt Weerman	Netherlands	xxx					NM	

==== Group B ====
Place	Athlete	Nation	1.83	1.88	1.92	1.95	1.97	Mark	Notes
1	Michaela Hrubá	Czech Republic	o	o	o			1.92 m	q
1	Yuliya Levchenko	Ukraine	o	o	o			1.92 m	q
1	Nicola Olyslagers	Australia	-	o	o			1.92 m	q
4	Maria Żodzik	Poland	xo	o	o			1.92 m	q
5	Rose Amoanimaa Yeboah	Ghana	xo	xo	o			1.92 m	q
6	Christina Honsel	Germany	xo	o	xo			1.92 m	q
7	Marija Vuković	Montenegro	o	o	xxo			1.92 m	q, SB
8	Elena Kulichenko	Cyprus	o	o	xxx			1.88 m	q
8	Elisabeth Pihela	Estonia	o	o	xxx			1.88 m	q
10	Vashti Cunningham	United States	xo	o	xxx			1.88 m	
11	Kateryna Tabashnyk	Ukraine	xxo	xo	xxx			1.88 m	
12	Emma Gates	United States	xo	xxo	xxx			1.88 m	
13	Emily Whelan	Australia	xxo	xxo	xxx			1.88 m	
14	Asia Tavernini	Italy	xxo	xxx				1.83 m	
—	Lamara Distin	Jamaica	xxx					NM	
—	Ellen Ekholm	Sweden	xxx					NM	
—	Buse Savaşkan	Turkey	xxx					NM	
—	Hellen Tenorio	Colombia	xxx					NM	

=== Final ===
Place	Athlete	Nation	1.88	1.93	1.97	2.00	2.02	Mark	Notes
1st place, gold medalist(s)	Nicola Olyslagers	Australia	-	o	o	o	xxx	2.00 m	
2nd place, silver medalist(s)	Maria Żodzik	Poland	xo	o	o	xxo	xxx	2.00 m	PB
3rd place, bronze medalist(s)	Yaroslava Mahuchikh	Ukraine	-	o	o	x-	xx	1.97 m	
3rd place, bronze medalist(s)	Angelina Topić	Serbia	o	o	o	xxx		1.97 m	SB
5	Yuliya Levchenko	Ukraine	o	o	xo	xxx		1.97 m	
5	Eleanor Patterson	Australia	o	o	xo	xxx		1.97 m	
7	Christina Honsel	Germany	o	o	xxx			1.93 m	
7	Morgan Lake	Great Britain & N.I.	o	o	xxx			1.93 m	
9	Elena Kulichenko	Cyprus	o	xo	xxx			1.93 m	
10	Merel Maes	Belgium	o	xxo	xxx			1.93 m	
11	Imke Onnen	Germany	xo	xxo	xxx			1.93 m	
12	Michaela Hrubá	Czech Republic	o	xxx				1.88 m	
12	Fatoumata Balley	Guinea	o	xxx				1.88 m	
12	Marija Vuković	Montenegro	o	xxx				1.88 m	
15	Rose Amoanimaa Yeboah	Ghana	xo	xxx				1.88 m	
—	Elisabeth Pihela	Estonia	xxx					NM	
