= Natalya Spiridonova =

Russian high jumper (born 2002)

Personal information
- Nationality: Russian
- Born: 31 July 2002 (age 23)

Sport
- Country: Authorised Neutral Athletes
- Sport: Athletics
- Event: High Jump

Achievements and titles
- Personal bests: Outdoor: 1.92 m (2021); Indoor: 1.91 m (2022)
Medal record
World U20 Championships
| Gold medal – first place | 2021 Nairobi | high Jump |

Natalya Spiridonova (born 31 July 2002) is a Russian athlete who specializes in the high jump, she however competes as part of the authorized neutral athletes. She was the gold medallist at the World Athletics U20 Championships in 2021.
