= Ukraine at the 2025 World Athletics Championships =

- Flag of Ukraine
- WA code: UKR

in Tokyo, Japan 13 September 2025 – 21 September 2025
- Competitors: 23 (13 men and 10 women)
- Medals Ranked 41st: Gold 0 Silver 0 Bronze 1 Total 1

World Athletics Championships appearances
- 1993; 1995; 1997; 1999; 2001; 2003; 2005; 2007; 2009; 2011; 2013; 2015; 2017; 2019; 2022; 2023; 2025

Ukraine competed at the 2025 World Athletics Championships in Tokyo, Japan, from 13 to 21 September 2025.

== Medalists ==
Medal	Athlete	Event	Date
Bronze	Yaroslava Mahuchikh	Women's high jump	21 September

== Results ==
Ukraine entered 23 athletes to the championships: 10 women and 13 men.

Key

- Q = Qualified for the next round
- q = Qualified for the next round as a fastest loser or, in field events, by position without achieving the qualifying target
- NR = National record
- PB = Personal best
- SB = Season best
- N/A = Round not applicable for the event

=== Men ===
Track and road events

Athlete	Event	Heat		Semifinal		Final	
Athlete	Event	Result	Rank	Result	Rank	Result	Rank
Oleksandr Pohorilko	400 metres	45.44	35	Did not advance			
Ihor Hlavan	20 kilometres walk	—N/a				DQ	
Mykola Rushchak	20 kilometres walk	—N/a				1:21:57	26
Serhii Svitlychnyi	20 kilometres walk	—N/a				1:22:24	27
Ivan Banzeruk	35 kilometres walk	—N/a				DNF	
Ihor Hlavan	35 kilometres walk	—N/a				DNF	
Yehor Shelest	35 kilometres walk	—N/a				DQ	

Field events

Athlete	Event	Qualification		Final	
Athlete	Event	Distance	Position	Distance	Position
Oleh Doroshchuk	High jump	2.25	1 q	2.31	4
Vadym Kravchuk	High jump	2.16	29	Did not advance	
Dmytro Nikitin	High jump	2.21	21	Did not advance	
Oleksandr Onufriyev	Pole vault	5.55	18	Did not advance	
Artem Levchenko	Shot put	NM		Did not advance	
Mykhaylo Kokhan	Hammer throw	77.33	8 Q	82.02 PB	4
Artur Felfner	Javelin throw	76.13	33	Did not advance	

=== Women ===
Track and road events

Athlete	Event	Heat		Semifinal		Final	
Athlete	Event	Result	Rank	Result	Rank	Result	Rank
Lyudmyla Olyanovska	20 kilometres walk	—N/a				1:29:16	13
Mariia Sakharuk	20 kilometres walk	—N/a				1:30:38	19
Hanna Shevchuk	20 kilometres walk	—N/a				1:32:15	24
Hanna Shevchuk	35 kilometres walk	—N/a				2:49:44	8

Field events

Athlete	Event	Qualification		Final	
Athlete	Event	Distance	Position	Distance	Position
Yuliya Levchenko	High jump	1.92	1 q	1.97	5
Yaroslava Mahuchikh	High jump	1.92	1 q	1.97	3rd place, bronze medalist(s)
Kateryna Tabashnyk	High jump	1.88	21	Did not advance	
Olha Korsun	Triple jump	13.40	32	Did not advance	
Yana Hladiychuk	Pole vault	NM		Did not advance	
Maryna Kylypko	Pole vault	4.45	21	Did not advance	
Iryna Klymets	Hammer throw	66.58	30	Did not advance	
