= Kristi Snyman =

South African high jumper (born 2000)

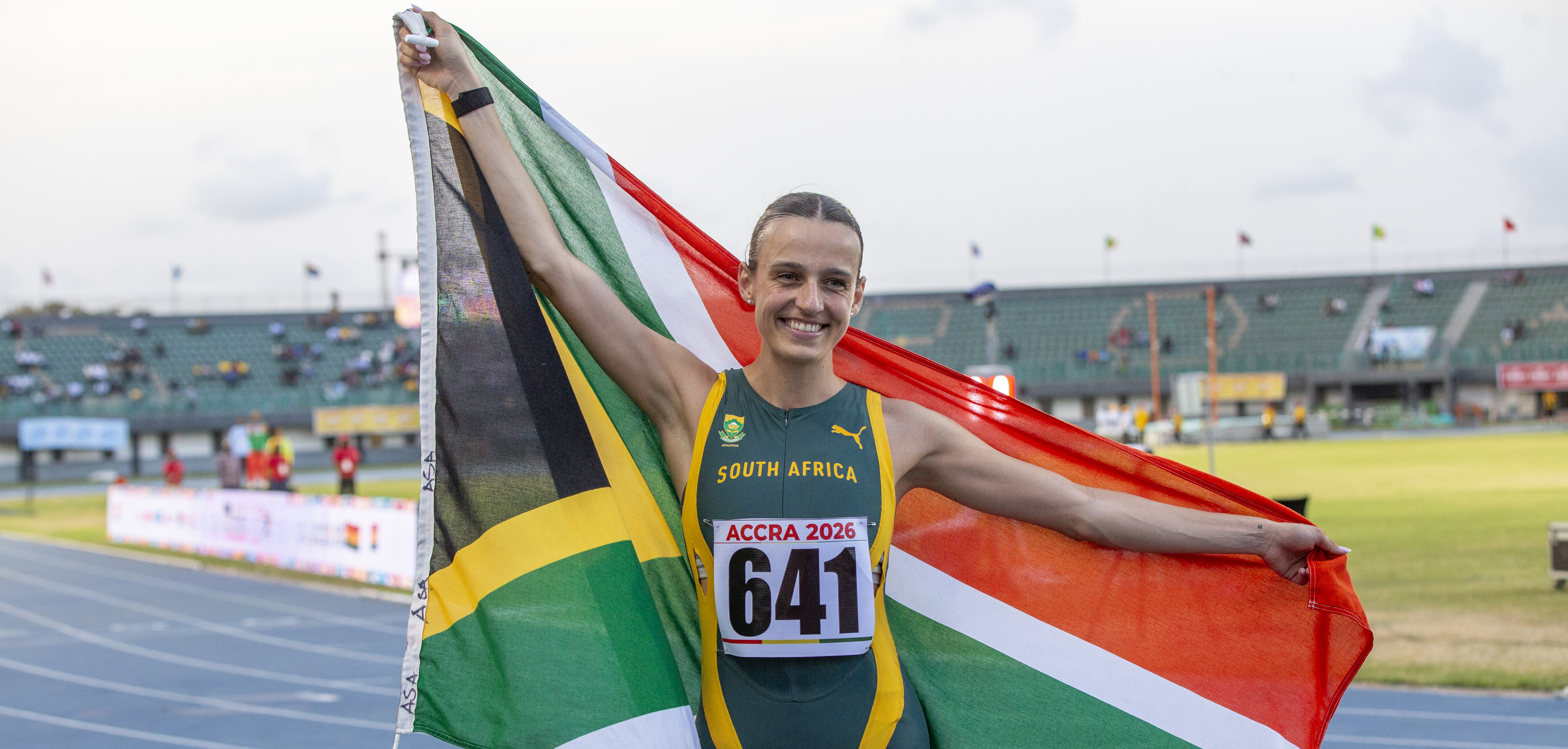
- At the 2026 African Championships

Personal information
- Full name: Kristi Perez-Snyman
- Born: 15 December 2000 (age 25)

Sport
- Sport: Athletics
- Event: High jump

Achievements and titles
- Personal best: High jump: 1.90m (2025)
Medal record
Women's athletics
Representing South Africa
African Championships
Gold medal – first place	2026 Accra	High jump

Kristi Perez-Snyman (born 15 December 2000) is a South African high jumper. She won the gold medal at the 2026 African Championships.

== Biography ==
From Cape Town, Snyman was a bronze medalist at the 2019 African Athletics U20 Championships in Abidjan. She was later educated in the United States at Jacksonville University.

In April 2025, Snyman won her first senior national title at the South African Athletics Championships with a personal best jump of 1.88 metres in Potchefstroom. The following month, she had an upset win clearing a new personal best 1.90 metres to win the SEC Championships for the University of Missouri ahead of two former NCAA champions in Elena Kulichenko and Rachel Glenn, before going on to place sixth overall at the 2025 NCAA Outdoor Championships in Eugene.

Snyman retained her title at the 2026 South African Athletics Championships in Stellenbosch in April 2026, clearing 1.83 metres. The following month, she won the gold medal at the 2026 African Championships in Accra, Ghana, with a jump of 1.84 metres.
