= Cypriot passport =

Passports issued to citizens of Cyprus

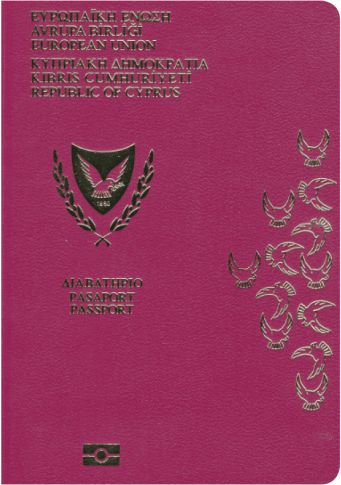
- The front cover of a Cypriot Citizen's biometric passport issued since 2010
- Type: Passport
- Issued by: Ministry of Interior
- First issued: 29 November 2010 (current version)
- Purpose: Identification
- Eligibility: Cypriot citizenship
- Expiration: 10 years (adults); 5 years (minors)
- Cost: €70 (adults); €120 (accelerated adults); €45 (minors); €95 (accelerated minors)

Cypriot passports are issued to citizens of Cyprus. Every Cypriot citizen is also a Commonwealth citizen and a citizen of the European Union. The Cypriot passport, along with the Cypriot identity card, allows for free right of movement and residence in any of the states of the European Union, European Economic Area, and Switzerland. As of October 2024, Cypriot citizens had visa-free or visa on arrival access to 178 countries and territories, ranking the Cypriot passport 13th in terms of travel freedom according to the Henley Passport Index. Cypriot citizens can live and work in any country within the EU as a result of the right of free movement and residence granted in Article 21 of the EU Treaty. The Republic of Cyprus was formed in 1960. All persons who were citizens of the Republic of Cyprus at this time are entitled to renew their citizenship and passport, whether living on the island or abroad within the diaspora. Their descendants, whether living on the island or abroad, are equally entitled to obtain Cypriot citizenship and passport. These citizens include the Greek and Turkish people, as well as the much smaller communities of Jewish and Armenian heritage.

== Language ==
All current and earlier Cypriot passports are inclusive, and so contain text in Greek, Turkish as well as English. Since 1974, the Turkish Cypriot community live mainly in the north of the island where the official language is Turkish (Cypriot dialect) and the Greek Cypriot community live mainly in the south of the island where the official language is Greek (Cypriot dialect). Many people are trilingual. Over 4 decades, many citizens of the Republic of Turkey have moved to Northern Cyprus to contribute to the labour force. As non-citizens of the island in 1960, this generation of workers are not entitled to Citizenship of the Republic of Cyprus.

== Physical appearance ==
Biometric passports have been issued since 13 December 2010 and include text in all official languages of the European Union. They carry a microchip containing biometric data such as fingerprints, a biometric photograph, and a digital signature. Inside, on different pages, there are images of a statue of the goddess Aphrodite on display at the Cyprus Museum, a dove carrying an olive branch, a symbol of peace, and the Cypriot mouflon.

== Visa requirements ==
Visa requirements for Cypriot citizens Cyprus Freedom of movement Visa free Visa issued upon arrival eVisa Visa available both on arrival or online Visa required prior to arrival

As of July 2023 Cypriot citizens had visa-free or visa on arrival access to 179 countries and territories, ranking the Cypriot passport 12th in terms of travel freedom according to the Henley Passport Index.

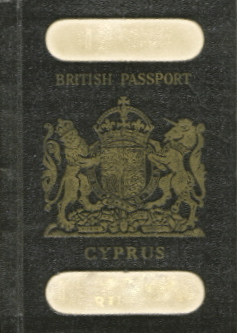
British Cyprus Passport (pre-1960)

== Application ==
The Civil Registry and Immigration Department of the Ministry of the Interior is responsible for issuing and renewing Cypriot passports.

== Revocation ==
Passport revocation took place for 26 individuals in 2019 for the first time after a Reuters investigation on Cyprus citizen-by-investment program, where foreign individuals are granted citizenship after investing €2 million worth of real estate in Cyprus. Simultaneously, the Interior Minister Constantinos Petrides opened an official investigation to all investors granted a Cypriot citizenship prior to 2018.

== See also ==
- Cypriot nationality law
- Visa requirements for Cypriot citizens
- Northern Cypriot passport
- Passports of the European Union
- Henley & Partners Visa Restrictions Index
