= Cypriot identity card =

National identity card of Cyprus

- Type: Compulsory identity document
- Issued by: Cyprus
- First issued: 24 February 2015 (biometric)
- Valid in: EFTA; European Union; United Kingdom (EU Settlement Scheme); Rest of Europe (except Belarus, Moldova (old version), Russia, and Ukraine) Georgia; Montserrat (max. 14 days); Northern Cyprus; Overseas France
- Eligibility: Cypriot citizenship
- Expiration: Adult – 10 years; Child – 5 years
- Cost: Adult – €30; Child – €20

The Cypriot identity card (Greek: Κυπριακό δελτίο ταυτότητας or Κυπριακή ταυτότητα; Turkish: Kimlik kartı) is issued to citizens of Cyprus. It can be used as a travel document when visiting countries in Europe (except Belarus, Moldova (old version), Russia, and Ukraine), as well as French overseas territories, Montserrat, and Georgia. This document is not valid in Turkey.

In February 2015, the Republic of Cyprus started issuing biometric identity cards.

In August 2020, new ID cards conforming to EU standards under Regulation (EU) 2019/1157|Regulation 2019/1157 began to be issued.

== Physical appearance ==
The colour of the current Cypriot identity card is a light shade of cyan. The coat of arms of Cyprus is situated in the centre on both sides of the card. On the top left of the front side, the name of the Republic of Cyprus is printed in English, Greek (Κυπριακή Δημοκρατία, Greek pronunciation: [cipɾiaˈci ðimokɾaˈti.a]), and Turkish (Kıbrıs Cumhuriyeti, Turkish pronunciation: [ˈkɯbɾɯs d͡ʒumhuɾijeˈti]), next to a smaller grayscale coat of arms.

Cards issued according to Regulation 2019/1157 feature the flag of Europe with Cyprus’ two-letter country code “CY” printed in negative under the card number. The card is valid for 10 years (5 years for minors under 18) from the time of issue.

=== Identity information page ===
Cypriot identity cards include the following data:

Front

- Photo of cardholder
- Card number
- Given names
- Surname

Back

- Sex
- Date of birth
- Place of birth
- Nationality
- Father’s name
- Mother’s name
- Mother’s maiden name
- Date of issue
- Date of expiry

The acquisition and possession of an identity card is compulsory for any eligible person aged 12 years and above.

== National Alien’s ID card of Cyprus ==
The Cypriot Alien’s identity card was formerly issued to citizens of other EU Member States and to nationals of third countries who were legally resident in the Republic of Cyprus at the time of application. Although the card could be used within Cyprus for personal identification purposes, it was not valid as a travel document. The government ceased issuing Alien’s identity cards to foreigners in April 2011, after many holders mistakenly believed that the card granted them the right to travel within the European Union. Following the discontinuation, existing cards gradually lost practical relevance and are no longer accepted for official purposes.

In 2011, the Civil Registry and Migration Department announced that the Ministry of Interior was considering the introduction of a new residence document to replace the former non-national identity card. Instead of a national identity card for foreigners, Cyprus subsequently aligned its system with EU residence documentation standards.

Today, foreign residents in Cyprus are issued biometric residence cards or residence permits, depending on their status. EU citizens and their family members receive residence certificates or cards under EU free-movement law, while third-country nationals are issued biometric residence permits under national immigration legislation. These documents serve exclusively as proof of legal residence and do not replace national identity cards.

In line with EU Regulation (EU) 2019/1157, Cyprus is also upgrading its identity and residence documentation to enhanced biometric formats. Older paper-based certificates and legacy documents are being phased out, with full compliance required by August 2026.

== ID cards of citizens of Northern Cyprus ==
ID cards of Northern Cyprus are issued to citizens of the self-declared Turkish Republic of Northern Cyprus, which is recognised only by Turkey. Citizens of Northern Cyprus are those granted citizenship by its government, established following the Turkish invasion of Cyprus in 1974, which divided the island’s Greek and Turkish communities.

Because Northern Cyprus is not internationally recognised, holders of its ID cards or passports do not enjoy rights of free movement. These IDs can, however, be used as travel documents when entering Turkey or the Republic of Cyprus through official checkpoints.

Every Turkish Cypriot is entitled to Turkish citizenship; however, many Turkish Cypriots born in Cyprus who can trace their residence before the partition can apply for and receive Cypriot citizenship.

== See also ==
- National identity cards in the European Economic Area
