= Styliana Ioannidou =

Cupriot high jumper (born 2003)

Personal information
- Born: 17 December 2003 (age 22)

Sport
- Sport: Athletics
- Event: High Jump

Achievements and titles
- Personal bests: High Jump: 1.91m (Bergen, 2025)
Medal record
Women's athletics
Representing Cyprus
World U20 Championships
Bronze medal – third place	2021 Nairobi	high Jump
European Youth Olympic Festival
Bronze medal – third place	2019 Baku	High jump

Styliana Ioannidou (Greek: Στυλιάνα Ιωαννίδου; born 17 December 2003) is a Cypriot high jumper. She is a multiple time national champion, and represented Cyprus at the 2025 World Championships. In 2021, she became the first Cypriot to win a medal at the World Athletics U20 Championships.

== Biography ==
In 2019, Ioannidou won the bronze medal in the high jump at the 2019 European Youth Summer Olympic Festival in Baku, Azerbaijan. The following year, she won the gold medal at the Indoor Balkan U20 Games in Istanbul, with a national youth record jump of 1.82 metres. In August 2020, she became the senior Cypriot national women's champion, with a jump of 1.84m, breaking her own under-18 national record in Nicosia.

In February 2021, she retained her indoor title at the Balkan Indoor Championships in Sofia, Bulgaria, breaking the championship record with a jump of 1.84 metres. Ioannidou placed sixth as a 17-year-old at the 2021 European Athletics U20 Championships in July 2021 in Tallinn, Estonia. The following month, she won the bronze medal at the 2021 World Athletics U20 Championships in Nairobi, Kenya, with a jump of 1.87 metres. It was the first Cypriot medal ever won at the championships and equalled the under-20 Cypriot record set in 2013 by Leontia Kallenou.

Ioannidou jumped a personal best 1.91 metres to place fourth overall at the 2025 European Athletics U23 Championships in Bergen, Norway. That summer, she also placed fourth at the 2025 Summer World University Games in Bochum, Germany in the women's high jump. She represented Cyprus in September at the 2025 World Athletics Championships in Tokyo, Japan.

In July 2026, she placed tenth in the high jump at the 2026 Commonwealth Games in Glasgow, Scotland. In August, she competed at the 2026 European Athletics Championships in Birmingham, England.

== Personal life ==
She studied at the Laniteion Lyceum in Limassol.
