= Dorothea Gantert =

German high jumper (born 2006)

Personal information
- Born: 30 October 2006 (age 19)

Sport
- Sport: Athletics
- Event: High jump

Dorothea Gantert (born 30 October 2006) is a German high jumper. She won the German Athletics Championships in 2026, and represented Germany at the 2026 European Athletics Championships.

== Biography ==
From Laatzen, and a member of SpVg Laatzen, Gantert placed third in Dortmund in the high jump at the 2025 German Youth Indoor Championships. She represented Germany at the 2025 European Athletics U20 Championships, qualifying for the final and placing eleventh overall.

In June 2026, Gantert cleared 1.87 metres to win the Internationales Sparkassenmeeting in Osterode, moving to the top of the German season rankings. Gantert won the German Athletics Championships in Bochum in July 2026, clearing a personal best height of 1.89 metres. In August, she represented Germany at the 2026 European Athletics Championships clearing 1.84 metres without advancing to the final.
