= Anna-Elisabeth Ehlers =

German heptathlete

Personal information
- Nationality: German
- Born: 18 August 2006 (age 20)

Sport
- Sport: Athletics
- Event: Heptathlon

Achievements and titles
- Personal best: Heptathlon: 6374 (2026)

Anna-Elisabeth Ehlers (born 18 August 2006) is a German multi-event athlete and high jumper. She represented Germany at the 2026 European Athletics Championships.

== Biography ==
A member of TSV Bayer 04 Leverkusen since 2024, working with coach Jörg Roos, she had previously been with TSV Glücksburg 09. In 2021, she was German U16 age-group champion in the high jump, later becoming German U18 champion in the discipline in 2023.

Ehlers set a personal best in the heptathlon of 6216 points competing in Tenerife, Spain in June 2026, at the age of 19 years-old. Competing in Ratingen in June 2026, she jumped a personal best 1.90 metres in the high jump, finishing in fourth place overall with 6,193 points. The following week, a jump of 1.89 meters helped her to win the German U23 championships in the high jump.

Ehlers represented Germany at the 2026 European Athletics Championships in Birmingham, England, in August, clearing 1.84 metres without advancing to the final. In September she jumped a personal best 1.91 metres, as part of an overall personal best score of 6374 points, while competing in the heptathlon in at the Décastar in Talence. The score was enough to place second overall behind Nafissatou Thiam. In a breakthrough competition, she recorded six personal bests in seven disciplines, running below 14 seconds for the 100 metes hurdles for the first time, with 13.78 seconds, running a new personal best of 24.30 seconds in the 200 metres on the first day, and recording a wind-legal long jump of 6.48 metres as well as throwing over 40 metres mark for the first time in the javelin with a throw of 40.78 m. She finished the season placed sixth in the 2026 World Athletics Combined Events Tour rankings.

== Personal life ==
A Leverkusen native, after graduating high school she began studying law in Cologne.
