= Cypriot nationality law =

The Republic of Cyprus Citizenship Law, 1967 Ο περί του Πολίτου της Κυπριακής Δημοκρατίας Νόμος του 1967 Kıbrıs Cumhuriyeti Vatandaşlık Kanunu, 1967

House of Representatives
- Long title: A law to make provision for the citizenship of the Republic and for matters connected therewith
- Citation: No. 43 of 1967
- Territorial extent: Cyprus (including Northern Cyprus)
- Enacted by: House of Representatives
- Enacted: 28 July 1967
- Commenced: 28 July 1967
- Status: Amended

The primary law governing nationality of Cyprus is the Republic of Cyprus Citizenship Law, 1967, which came into force on 28 July 1967. The law applies to the entire island of Cyprus, which includes the Republic of Cyprus itself and Northern Cyprus, a breakaway region that is diplomatically recognised only by Turkey as the Turkish Republic of Northern Cyprus (TRNC).

Cyprus is a member state of the European Union (EU) and all Cypriot nationals are EU citizens. They are entitled to free movement rights in EU and European Free Trade Association (EFTA) countries, and may vote in elections to the European Parliament.

Individuals born to at least one Cypriot parent automatically acquire citizenship at birth only if neither parent is considered an illegal migrant. Birth in Cyprus by itself does not make a child eligible for citizenship. Foreign nationals may become Cypriot citizens by naturalisation after completing a residence requirement (normally seven years).

Cyprus was previously a colony of the British Empire and local residents were British subjects. Although Cyprus gained independence in 1960 and Cypriot citizens no longer hold British nationality, they remain Commonwealth citizens under British law. When residing in the United Kingdom, Cypriot citizens are eligible to vote in UK elections and serve in public office there.

== Terminology ==
The distinction between the meaning of the terms citizenship and nationality is not always clear in the English language and differs by country. Generally, nationality refers to a person's legal belonging to a sovereign state and is the common term used in international treaties when addressing members of a country, while citizenship usually means the set of rights and duties a person has in that nation.

In the Cypriot context, citizenship is distinct from communal affiliation. All citizens of the Republic hold the same citizenship. Separately, the 1960 Constitution assigned most citizens to either the Greek Cypriot or Turkish Cypriot community, while three minorities were recognised as specially designated religious groups (Armenians, Maronites, and Latins). Political representation and key constitutional institutions were organised through these communities rather than through a single civic nation, giving the constitutional order a bi-communal character. The Greek and Turkish communities therefore constituted the Republic's primary political communities despite sharing a common citizenship. Following the division of the island in 1974, Turkish Cypriots formally retained full citizenship of the Republic but have often encountered practical obstacles in exercising its associated rights, particularly because the Republic does not recognise civil documents, including birth certificates, issued by the authorities in Northern Cyprus.

== History ==
=== Colonial-era policies ===
The island of Cyprus was conquered by the Ottoman Empire in 1570. Accordingly, Ottoman nationality law applied to the island. Cyprus was governed by the Ottomans for three centuries until it was leased to the British Empire in 1878. While the island remained under nominal Ottoman sovereignty, no authority on Cyprus existed to enforce Ottoman laws. Cypriot residents ostensibly remained Ottoman subjects but travelled using documents that labeled them as "natives of Cyprus" instead of Ottoman passports.

Britain fully annexed the island at the start of the First World War in 1914 after Ottoman entry into the war in support of the Central Powers and British nationality law became applicable to the island, as was the case elsewhere in the British Empire. Cypriots and all other imperial citizens were British subjects; any person born in Cyprus, the United Kingdom, or anywhere else within Crown dominions was a natural-born British subject.

Turkey formally relinquished all claims to Cyprus in the 1923 Treaty of Lausanne and the island became a Crown colony in 1925. Ottoman/Turkish subjects who were ordinarily resident in Cyprus on 5 November 1914 automatically became British subjects on that date. However, any such person had the right to choose Turkish nationality within two years of the treaty's enforcement, provided that they permanently departed Cyprus for Turkey within 12 months of that choice. While about 9,000 Turkish Cypriots elected to become Turkish nationals, most either did not leave or subsequently returned to Cyprus due to poor economic conditions in Anatolia.

Colonial officials adhered to a policy of divide and rule, pitting the Greek and Turkish Cypriot communities against each other to weaken opposition to their own authority. Beginning in 1926, further Turkish migration to Anatolia was restricted by the colonial government seeking to curb high levels of Muslim population outflow. To help retain a sizable Turkish community, the colonial government enacted a law in 1930 that allowed Cypriots who opted for Turkish nationality under Lausanne but had not left the island to regain British nationality. They further claimed that the Cypriots who had chosen Turkish nationality and had already departed for Turkey still remained British subjects (unless they otherwise naturalised) because the terms of the Treaty of Lausanne had not been implemented in domestic law.

Imperial nationality law was comprehensively reformed in 1948. The British Nationality Act 1948 redefined British subject to mean any citizen of the United Kingdom, its colonies, or other Commonwealth countries. Commonwealth citizen was first defined in this Act to have the same meaning. While previously all subjects of the Empire held a common status through allegiance to the Crown, each Commonwealth country under the reformed system became responsible for legislating their own nationality laws and would maintain a common status by voluntary agreement among all the member states. British subjects under the previous meaning who held that status on 1 January 1949, because of a connection with the United Kingdom or a remaining colony (including Cyprus), became Citizens of the United Kingdom and Colonies (CUKC).

=== Independence and a tenuous republic ===
Greek Cypriots wanted enosis (union with Greece) while Turkish Cypriots vehemently opposed this and favoured taksim (partition of the island). Each of these communities held a strong affinity to Greece or Turkey but no particular attachment to the idea of a Cyprus detached from either culture. Greek dissatisfaction with British rule led to open revolt in the 1950s during the Cyprus Emergency, which ultimately resulted in the 1959 London and Zürich Agreements and a multilateral accord between the UK, Greece, and Turkey on Cypriot independence in the following year.

Cyprus became an independent republic on 16 August 1960, although Britain retained control of two military bases in Akrotiri and Dhekelia. The Constitution of Cyprus specified that the requirements for holding Cypriot citizenship after independence would be determined by Annex D of the Treaty of Establishment. Any CUKC born in Cyprus automatically acquired Cypriot citizenship on that date if they were ordinarily resident in the country at any time within the five years immediately preceding independence, as well as any person born overseas to a father who also became a citizen. CUKCs of Cypriot origin who had not resided in Cyprus during the five years before independence did not become Cypriot citizens and retained CUKC status. Former Ottoman subjects of Cypriot origin who had not become British subjects in 1914 were entitled to Cypriot citizenship on application, as well as widowed or divorced women who otherwise would have been married to Cypriot citizens. The Republic of Cyprus Citizenship Law later enacted by the House of Representatives in 1967 provides a full framework detailing citizenship requirements after that point.

=== Divided island ===
Tensions between the Greek and Turkish Cypriot political leadership led to a collapse of cooperative government in 1963 and triggered a period of sustained intercommunal violence that lasted until 1967. While the two communities were able to coexist in relative peace during the subsequent years, the military dictatorship of Greece successfully overthrew the Cypriot government in 1974. Consequently, Turkey invaded the northern part of Cyprus and divided the country, after which the Republic of Cyprus retained control over the southern two-thirds of the island.

While Turkish Cypriots remained citizens of the Republic, their access beyond the border was restricted by the government of the occupied territories, which limited their access to Cypriot citizenship documents. The Turkish Republic of Northern Cyprus was established in 1983 in the northern part of the island and Turkish Cypriots became eligible for TRNC passports. However, because the TRNC is not recognised by any country other than Turkey, these documents have very little practical use outside these two countries and Turkish Cypriots were more inclined to obtain Turkish passports instead. After travel restrictions between the two regions were reduced after introduction of the Annan Plan, TRNC residents more frequently sought to obtain Cypriot passports.

=== Commonwealth citizenship ===
All British subjects/Commonwealth citizens under the reformed structure of nationality created in 1948 initially held an automatic right to settle in the United Kingdom and Ireland. Non-white immigration into the UK was systemically discouraged, but strong economic conditions in Britain following the Second World War attracted an unprecedented wave of colonial migration. In response, the British Parliament imposed immigration controls on any subjects originating from outside the British Islands with the Commonwealth Immigrants Act 1962. Ireland had continued to allow all British subjects free movement despite independence in 1922 as part of the Common Travel Area arrangement, but moved to mirror Britain's restriction in 1962 by limiting this ability only to people born on the islands of Great Britain or Ireland. Britain somewhat relaxed these measures in 1971 for patrials, subjects whose parents or grandparents were born in the United Kingdom, which gave effective preferential treatment to white Commonwealth citizens.

Following Cypriot independence in 1960, Commonwealth citizens of Cypriot descent have remained eligible for facilitated acquisition of citizenship; they may register as Cypriot citizens after 12 months of residence while other persons of Cypriot descent with non-Commonwealth nationality may only naturalise after living in the country for at least five years.

The UK updated its nationality law to reflect the more modest boundaries of its remaining territory and possessions with the British Nationality Act 1981, which redefined British subject to no longer also mean Commonwealth citizen. Cypriot citizens remain Commonwealth citizens in British law and continue to be eligible to vote and stand for public office in the UK. Individuals who did not acquire Cypriot citizenship at independence, retained CUKC status, and lacked right of abode in the United Kingdom became reclassified as British Overseas citizens as part of the 1981 reform.

=== European integration ===
Cyprus joined the European Union as part of the EU's 2004 enlargement. Cypriot citizens have since been able to live and work in other EU/EFTA countries under free movement rights established by the 1992 Maastricht Treaty and participated in their first European Parliament elections in 2004. The scope of these rights includes the entire European Economic Area (EEA), encompassing all EU and EFTA member states other than Switzerland, which concluded a separate free movement agreement with the EU that came into force in 2002. Liechtenstein exceptionally maintains immigration controls on EEA/Swiss citizens despite its EEA membership due to the country's small geographic and population size.

Before the UK's withdrawal from the EU in 2020, Cypriot citizens held a particularly favoured status there. While non-EU Commonwealth citizens continued to need a residence visa to live in the UK, Cypriot citizens were able to settle there and immediately hold full rights to political participation due to their status as both Commonwealth and EU citizens. Cypriot citizens (along with Irish and Maltese citizens) domiciled in the UK were able to vote in the 2016 United Kingdom European Union membership referendum while all other non-British EU citizens were not.

=== Citizenship by investment ===
In 2013, a citizenship by investment pathway was created to attract foreign investment into the country. Through the Cyprus Investment Programme, a foreigner could acquire Cypriot citizenship after investing €2 million in real estate, infrastructure projects, local businesses, or domestic financial assets and maintaining that sum within the Republic for at least five years. Candidates needed to have a clean criminal record, must not have been denied naturalisation in any other EU member state, and were required to purchase a residence in the country valued at least €500,000 that must be retained permanently. A further donation of €150,000 became required in 2019, half of which would go to a scientific research fund and the other half dedicated towards financing affordable housing on the island.

Investors who successfully naturalised are subject to periodic checks that verify their continued ownership of real estate in Cyprus and are liable to have their citizenship revoked if discovered to have divested themselves of that property without a replacement residence. This stipulation was made in violation of Article 63 of the Treaty on the Functioning of the European Union, which prohibits restrictions on the movement of capital.

The European Commission repeatedly condemned this citizenship pathway for its high risks in aiding money laundering, tax evasion, and corruption. A 2019 Reuters publication which reported that eight relatives and associates of Cambodian prime minister Hun Sen had acquired Cypriot citizenship by investment triggered a government investigation into the circumstances under which their citizenship was obtained. Following the release of a video recording showing Cypriot legislators offering to facilitate naturalisation for a fictional convicted investor, the programme was indefinitely suspended on 1 November 2020. In July 2022, the former president of the Cyprus Parliament and three others were charged with corruption for their part in the scandal.

== Acquisition and loss of citizenship ==
=== Entitlement by descent ===
A person born to at least one parent who is a Cypriot citizen usually automatically receives citizenship at birth regardless of birthplace. Citizenship is only granted automatically if neither parent is considered an illegal migrant. Otherwise, it may only be acquired by a Council of Ministers decision. In practice, this makes Cypriot citizenship difficult to obtain for children born to Turkish Cypriots married to Turkish nationals in Northern Cyprus.

=== Registration by descent or marriage ===
British, Irish, and Commonwealth citizens of Cypriot descent are eligible to acquire Cypriot citizenship by registration after residing in the country for 12 months and submit a signed statement of loyalty to the state. They may also qualify to register as citizens if they are employed in Cypriot government service and either intend to live in the Republic or continue service.

Non-citizens who are married to Cypriot citizens may acquire citizenship by registration after three years of marriage and cohabitation. The residence requirement may be waived provided that the couple has been married for at least two years. Widowed spouses may still register for citizenship provided that the acquisition requirements were fulfilled before the Cypriot spouse's death. Underage children of a Cypriot citizen may be registered by their parent with no further requirements. Citizenship by registration is also conditional on legal residence; any person considered to be an illegal migrant is disqualified from registering as a Cypriot citizen.

=== Naturalisation ===
Foreigners who are parents or children of Cypriot citizens may acquire citizenship by naturalisation after residing in the country for at least four of the previous seven years, with an additional 12 months of residence immediately preceding an application, a total of five years. The four-year residence requirement may be partially or completely fulfilled by time employed in government service, but this may not be done for the 12 months immediately preceding a naturalisation application. Individuals without Cypriot descent may naturalise after a total of seven years of residence. Persons who perform extraordinary acts of service to Cyprus may be exceptionally granted Cypriot citizenship without any requirements at the discretion of the Council of Ministers.

=== Relinquishment and deprivation ===
Cypriot citizenship can be relinquished by submitting a declaration of renunciation. Citizenship may be involuntarily removed from naturalised or registered persons who: fraudulently acquired the status, committed an act of disloyalty against the state, aided an enemy nation with which Cyprus is at war, have been sentenced to incarceration for longer than 12 months within five years of acquiring citizenship, or lived overseas (other than those employed in government service) for a continuous period of seven years. After one of these conditions is met, the Council of Ministers must determine that it is not in the national interest for such a person to retain citizenship before it can be stripped.

== See also ==
- Visa policy of the Schengen Area
- Visa requirements for Cypriot citizens
