= Idea Pieroni =

Italian athlete (born 2002)

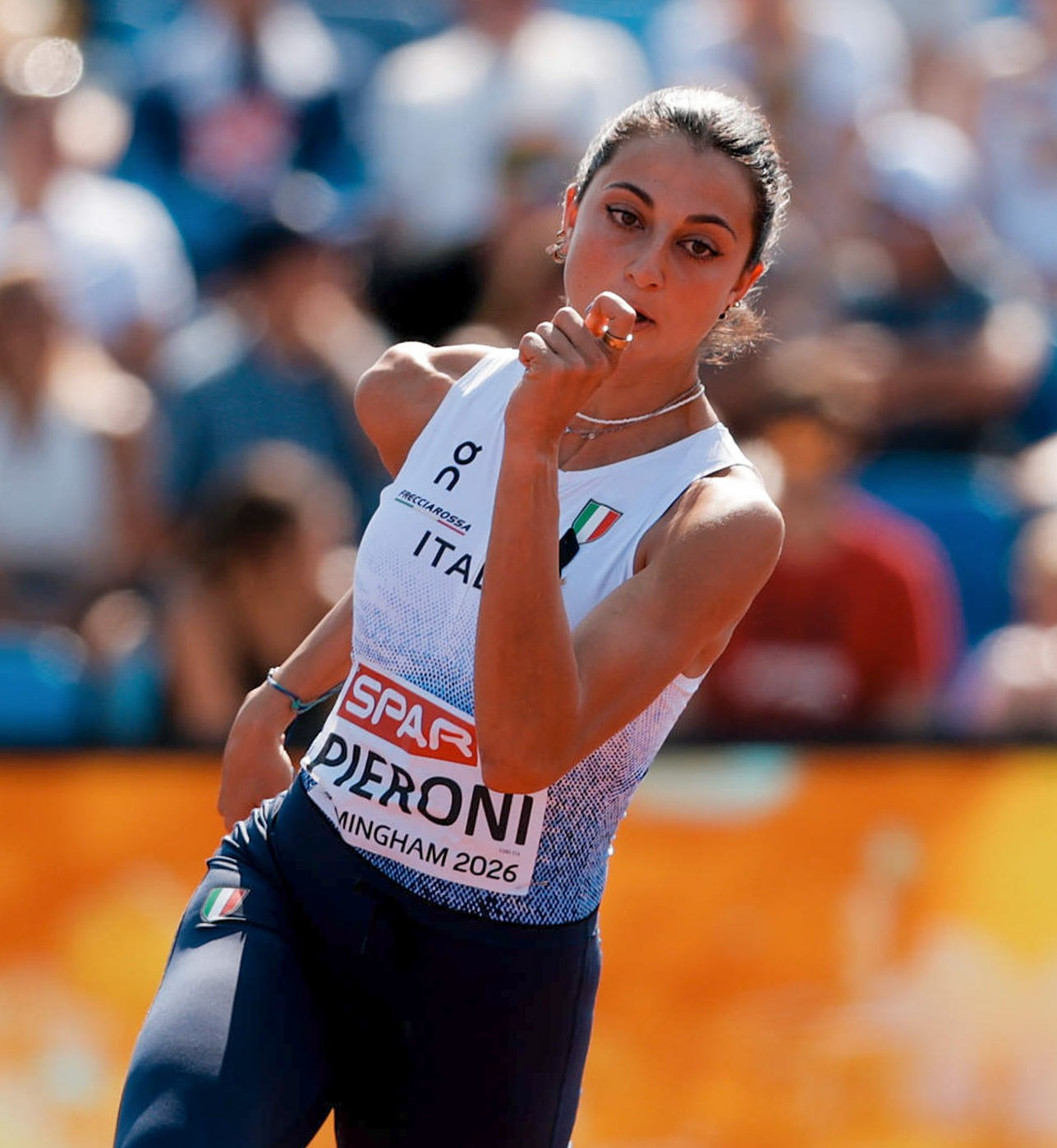

Personal information
- Nationality: Italian
- Born: 18 September 2002 (age 23)

Sport
- Sport: Athletics
- Event: High jump

Achievements and titles
- Personal bests: High jump: 1.93 m (Livorno, 2024)
Medal record
Women's athletics
Representing Italy
Mediterranean Games
Bronze medal – third place	2026 Taranto	High jump

Idea Pieroni (born 18 September 2002) is an Italian high jumper. She has won the Italian Athletics Championships indoors and outdoors. She finished in eighth place in the high jump at the 2025 World Athletics Championships in Nanjing, China.

== Career ==
She is a member of Atletica Virtus Lucca athletics club in Lucca, Tuscany, and Gruppo Marciatori Barga in Barga, Tuscany. She became a member of the Centro Sportivo Carabinieri, the sport section of the Italian armed force Carabinieri, having enlisted in 2020. Despute this, Pieroni continued to train in Lucca with tutelage by the federal coach Stefano Giardi. She set a personal best in the high jump of 1.90 metres in 2020 at the age of 18 years-old, but was just one centimetre away from breaking the Italian junior indoor record (1.91m).

In the summer of 2024 improved her best jump to 1.91 metres, and then later to 1.92 metres whilst competing in Prato, Italy, in July 2024. She won the high jump competition at the Italian Athletics Championships in La Spezia, in June 2024. She later increased her personal best to 1.93 metres in 2024.

She won the high jump at the 2025 Italian Indoor Athletics Championships in Ancona, with a height of 1.91 metres. She was selected for the 2025 European Athletics Indoor Championships in Apeldoorn, Netherlands, but did not progress to the final with her competition ending at 1.89 metres. She was selected for the 2025 World Athletics Indoor Championships in Nanjing, China. in March 2025. At the championships also held in March 2025, she finished in eighth place overall with a best clearance of 1.89 metres.

She competed at the 2025 World Athletics Championships in Tokyo, Japan, in September 2025, clearing 1.83 metres without advancing to the final.

On 1 March 2026, she placed second behind Aurora Vicini with a clearance of 1.87 metres at the senior Italian Indoor Athletics Championships in Ancona. In August 2026, she was a finalist at the 2026 European Athletics Championships in Birmingham, England.

== Personal life ==
She is from Barga, Tuscany.
