= Elena Kulichenko =

Cypriot athlete (born 2002)

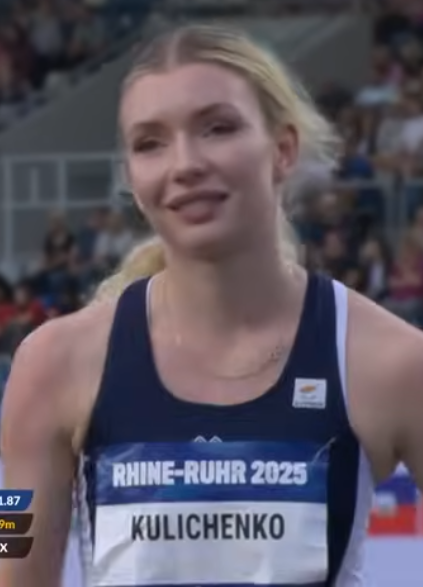
- At the 2025 Summer World University Games

Personal information
- Nationality: Cyprus
- Born: 28 July 2002 (age 24) Odintsovo, Russia

Sport
- Sport: Athletics
- Event: High Jump

Achievements and titles
- Personal bests: High Jump (Indoors): 1.95m (Bryan College Station 2025); High Jump (Outdoors): 1.97m (Eugene, 2024)NR
Medal record
Representing Russia
European Youth Olympic Festival
Silver medal – second place	2017 Győr	High jump
Representing Cyprus
European U23 Championships
Gold medal – first place	2023 Espoo	High jump
Summer World University Games
Silver medal – second place	2023 Chengdu	High jump
Bronze medal – third place	2025 Bochum	High jump
Mediterranean Games
Silver medal – second place	2026 Taranto	High jump

Elena Kulichenko (Russian: Елена Куличенко; Greek: Έλενα Κουλιτσένκο; born 28 July 2002) is a Russian-born Cypriot track and field athlete, a national record holder in the high jump.

== Early and personal life ==
From Odintsovo, she is the daughter of Marina Kulichenko and Alexei Kulichenko. After graduating from high school she studied and competed at a university in Russia, but found she was unhappy and accepted a scholarship to attend the University of Georgia to study International Development and to start competing for the Georgia Bulldogs.

== Career ==
=== Junior career ===
Kulichenko was the 2017 Russia U-18 National Outdoor Champion and was a silver medalist at the 2017 European Youth Olympic Festival in Győr. In 2018, she was granted permission to compete in junior events as a neutral athlete.

=== Cypriot switch ===
In 2019, she was again declared eligible to compete as an authorised neutral athlete by the IAAF Doping Review Board even while the Russian national federation remained suspended. She met the exceptional eligibility criteria to compete in international competition under competition Rule 22.1A(b).

She was able to gain Cypriot citizenship in 2019 because her father works and owns property in the country which had an investment program which allows foreign nationals who invest in the Cypriot economy to apply for passports for themselves and their families. The Amateur Athletic Association of Cyprus gave her the condition that she serve a transition season prior to competing for them internationally. She was quoted in Time as saying “It wasn't a spontaneous decision, I thought about it for a long time”, but that she received “hundreds of messages on Instagram calling me a traitor”.

She began competing on the American collegiate circuit and was named SEC Women's Indoor Freshman Field Athlete of the Year for 2022, and also earned First-Team All-American honors. She won the bronze medal in the high jump at the 2023 NCAA Division I Outdoor Track and Field Championships, held in Austin, Texas in June 2023, finishing behind Lamara Distin and Charity Griffiths.

In July 2023, she won the Cypriot national championships with a 1.90m clearance in Nicosia. Later that month, she cleared 1.91m to win gold at the 2023 European Athletics U23 Championships. It was Cyprus' first ever gold medal at the event.

=== Major championship debut and national records ===
She cleared 1.92m for a new outdoor personal best to qualify for the final on her major championship debut at the World Athletics Championships in Budapest, in August 2023.

She set a new Cypriot national record clearing 1.95 metres to win the SEC Championship in Gainesville, Florida on 9 May 2024. She increased that to 1.97m at the NCAA Championship final in Eugene, Oregon in June 2024, sharing the title with Rose Yeboah.

At the 2024 Olympics in Paris she finished seventh in the high jump event clearing 1.95 metres. She became only the second athlete from Cyprus to reach a Track and Field final at the Olympic games after Milan Trajkovic in 2012.

She tied for victory in the high jump at the 2025 NCAA Indoor Championships in Virginia Beach on 15 March, with Temitope Adeshina. She also won the high jump title at the 2025 NCAA Division I Outdoor Track and Field Championships with a jump of 1.96 metres.

She won the bronze medal at the 2025 Summer World University Games in Bochum, Germany in the women's high jump. She was a finalist in September at the 2025 World Championships in Tokyo, Japan, placing ninth overall with a clearance of 1.93 metres in the final.

In May 2026, she jumped 1.87 metres to place seventh in the 2026 Diamond League meeting in Rabat. She placed fifth in the high jump at the 2026 Commonwealth Games in Glasgow, Scotland. In August, she competed at the 2026 European Athletics Championships in Birmingham, England, placing joint-tenth overall.
