= Amateur Athletic Association of Cyprus =

Sports governing body in Cyprus

- Κυπριακή Ομοσπονδία Ερασιτεχνικού Αθλητισμού Στίβου
- Sport: Athletics
- Abbreviation: KOEAS
- Founded: 1983
- Affiliation: World Athletics
- Regional affiliation: EAA
- Headquarters: Strovolos, Nicosia, Cyprus
- President: Antonios Dracos
- Secretary: Pericles Damaris

Official website
- koeas.org.cy
- (Cyprus)

The Amateur Athletic Association of Cyprus (Greek: Κυπριακή Ομοσπονδία Ερασιτεχνικού Αθλητισμού Στίβου / ΚΟΕΑΣ) is the governing body for the sport of athletics in Cyprus.

KOEAS separated from the Hellenic Amateur Athletic Association (SEGAS) in 1983. Until then, the athletics club were affiliated to SEGAS.

== Affiliations ==
- World Athletics
- European Athletic Association (EAA)
- Cyprus Olympic Committee

== National records ==
KOEAS maintains the Cypriot records in athletics.
