= Filippa Fotopoulou =

Cypriot athlete (born 1996)

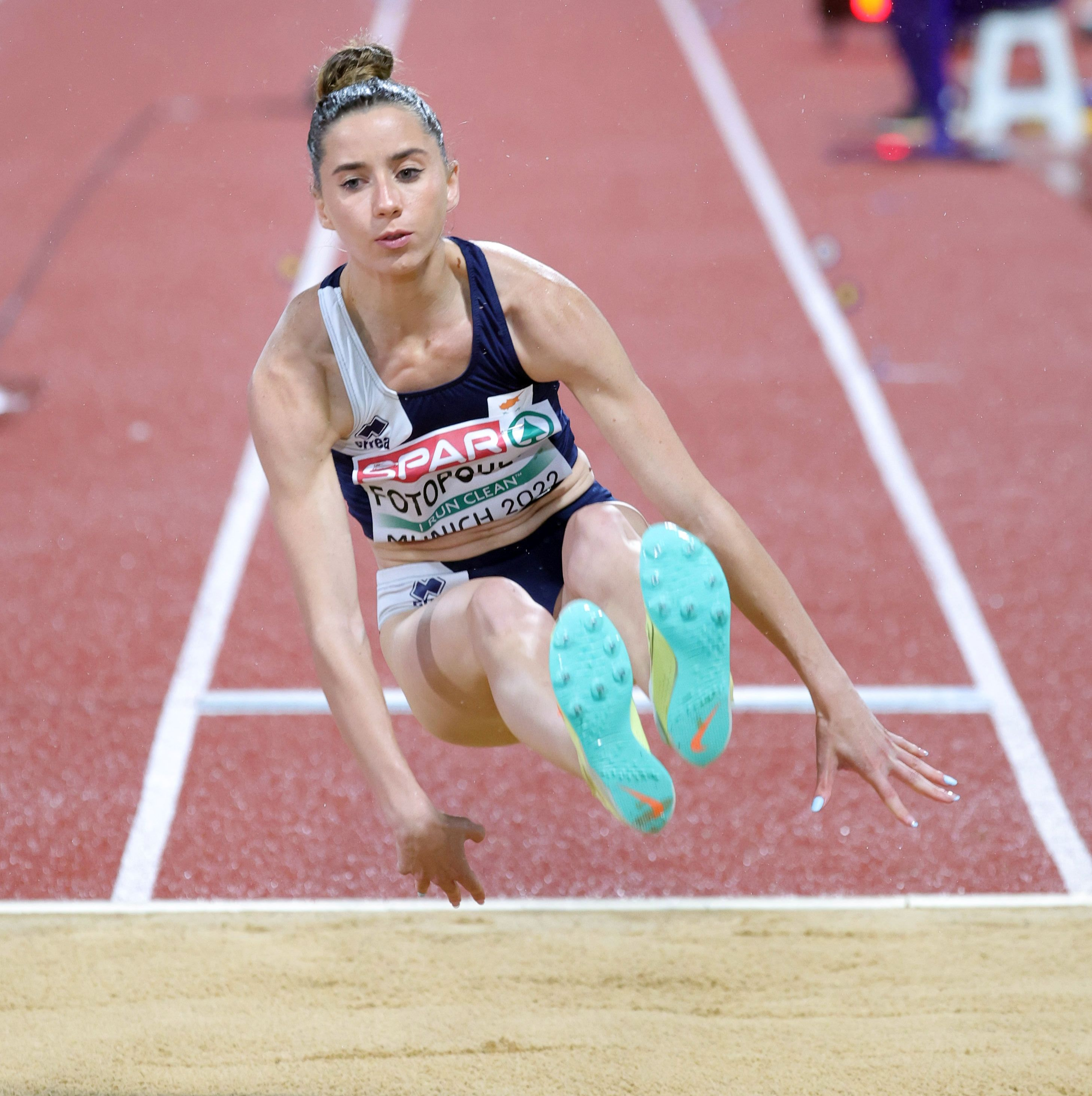

Personal information
- Nationality: Cyprus
- Born: Filippa Fotopoulou; 20 December 1996 (age 29) Limassol, Cyprus

Sport
- Sport: Athletics
- Events: Long jump, 4x100

Achievements and titles
- Personal bests: Long jump: 6.79 (Athens, 2022); Long jump indoor: 6.53 m (Instabul 2021, Dortmund 2025) NR; 4x100: 43.87 (Amsterdam, 2016) NR
Medal record
Women's athletics
Representing Cyprus
Mediterranean Games
Gold medal – first place	2026 Taranto	Long jump
Bronze medal – third place	2022 Oran	4x100 m

Filippa Fotopoulou formerly Filippa Kviten (Greek: Φιλίππα Φωτοπούλου, born 20 December 1996 in Limassol) is a Cypriot track and field athlete who competes as a long jumper.

== Career ==
In May 2022 she made her personal best with 6.79, just one cm less than the national record, which was held by Maroula Lambrou since 1985. The same year she competed in the 2022 European Athletics Championships – Women's long jump and placed 11th with a 6.54 jump and then at the 2022 World Athletics Championships in Eugene, Oregon in where she had three fault attempts during the qualification. She was 7th with a 6.34 jump at the 2022 Mediterranean Games. At the same games she won the bronze medal in the 4x100 relay.

On 22 May 2026 in Kifisia, she made a new personal best with 6.78 metres. Representing Cyprus at the 2026 Commonwealth Games in Glasgow, Scotland, she qualified for the final with a jump of 6.56 metres.

== Personal life ==
Her twin sister Olivia Fotopoulou is also an international athlete, competing in 100- and 200-metre races. Both sisters studied together at the University of Alabama.
