= Cyprus at the 2012 European Athletics Championships =

Cyprus competed at the 2012 European Athletics Championships held in Helsinki, Finland, between 27 June to 1 July 2012. 10 competitors, 8 men and 2 women took part in 11 events.

== Results ==
=== Men ===
Track events

Event	Athletes	Heat		Semifinal		Final	
Event	Athletes	Result	Rank	Result	Rank	Result	Rank
100 m	Panagiotis Ioannou	10.67	28	did not advance			
110 m hurdles	Alexandros Stavrides	14.14	29	did not advance			

Field events

Event	Athletes	Qualification		Final	
Event	Athletes	Result	Rank	Result	Rank
Triple jump	Zacharias Arnos	16.23	17	did not advance	
High jump	Kyriakos Ioannou	2.15	21	did not advance	
Pole vault	Nikandros Stylianou	NM	–	did not advance	
Shot put	Georgios Arestis	18.16	23	did not advance	
Discus throw	Apostolos Parellis	61.79	14	did not advance	
Hammer throw	Konstantinos Stathelakos	68.20	29	did not advance	

=== Women ===
Track events

Event	Athletes	Heat		Semifinal		Final	
Event	Athletes	Result	Rank	Result	Rank	Result	Rank
100 m	Eleni Artymata	11.64	24	did not advance			
200 m	Eleni Artymata	23.35	11 Q	23.21	7 q	23.59	7

Field events

Event	Athletes	Qualification		Final	
Event	Athletes	Result	Rank	Result	Rank
Long jump	Nektaria Panayi	6.31	16	did not advance	
