= Cyprus at the 2010 European Athletics Championships =

Sporting event delegation

Cyprus will be represented by 10 athletes at the 2010 European Athletics Championships held in Barcelona, Spain.

== Participants ==
=== Men ===
==== Track and field events ====
Athlete	Events	Heats		Semifinal		Final	
Athlete	Events	Result	Rank	Result	Rank	Result	Rank
Panayiotis Ioannou	100 m	10.61	25	Did not advance			
Alexandros Stavrides	110 m hurdles	14.04 (SB)	26	Did not advance			

==== Field events ====
Event	Athletes	Qualification		Final	
Event	Athletes	Result	Rank	Result	Rank
Long jump	Zacharias Arnos	7.61	24	Did not advance	
Triple jump	Zacharias Arnos	15.85	24	Did not advance	
Shot put	Georgios Arestis	18.23	23	Did not advance	
Discus throw	Apostolos Parellis	60.57(SB)	17	Did not advance	

=== Women ===
==== Track and road events ====
Athlete	Events	Heat		Semifinal		Final	
Athlete	Events	Result	Rank	Result	Rank	Result	Rank
Eleni Artymata	200 m	23.41	6 Q	23.14	7 q	22.61(NR)	6
Dimitra Arachoviti	100 m hurdles	13.61	25	Did not advance			

==== Field events ====
Event	Athletes	Qualification		Final	
Event	Athletes	Result	Rank	Result	Rank
Pole vault	Mariánna Zachariadi	4.25	15	Did not advance	
Hammer throw	Paraskevi Theodorou	60.16	21	Did not advance	

== Results ==
2010 Barcelona	Gold	Silver	Bronze	Total
Cyprus (CYP)	0	0	0	0
