= 2025 European Athletics U23 Championships – Women's 3000 metres steeplechase =

Women's 3000 metres steeplechase at the 2025 European Athletics U23 Championships
- Venue: Fana Stadion
- Location: Bergen, Norway
- Dates: 18 July (heats); 19 July (final)
- Competitors: 26 from 16 nations
- Winning time: 9:30.49

Medalists
| gold medal | Ilona Mononen | Finland |
| silver medal | Marta Serrano | Spain |
| bronze medal | Adia Budde | Germany |

The women's 3000 metres steeplechase event at the 2025 European Athletics U23 Championships was held in Bergen, Norway, at Fana Stadion on 18 and 19 July.

== Records ==
Prior to the competition, the records were as follows:

| Record | Athlete (nation) | Time (s) | Location | Date |
|---|---|---|---|---|
| European U23 record | Anna Emilie Møller (DEN) | 9:13.46 | Doha, Qatar | 30 September 2019 |
| Championship U23 record | Olivia Gürth (GER) | 9:26.98 | Espoo, Finland | 15 July 2023 |

== Results ==
=== Heats ===
First 5 in each heat (Q) and the next 5 fastest (q) qualified for the final.

==== Heat 1 ====
| Place | Athlete | Nation | Time | Notes |
|---|---|---|---|---|
| 1 | Ilona Mononen | Finland | 9:57.68 | Q |
| 2 | Clara Entresangle | France | 9:57.74 | Q, PB |
| 3 | Emily Parker | Great Britain | 9:57.78 | Q |
| 4 | Adia Budde | Germany | 9:57.82 | Q |
| 5 | Hanna Ackermann | Germany | 9:57.94 | Q |
| 6 | Pelinsu Şahin | Turkey | 9:58.63 | q |
| 7 | Vasiliki Kalimoyanni | Greece | 9:59.96 | q |
| 8 | Thea Charlotte Knutsen | Norway | 10:03.45 | q |
| 9 | Martyna Krawczyńska | Poland | 10:03.82 | q, SB |
| 10 | Petra Santos | Portugal | 10:11.92 | |
| 11 | Alexandra Joyce | Ireland | 10:15.63 | |
| 12 | Francesca Mentasti | Italy | 10:20.06 | |
| 13 | Lowa Branth | Sweden | 10:36.08 | |

==== Heat 2 ====
| Place | Athlete | Nation | Time | Notes |
|---|---|---|---|---|
| 1 | Marta Serrano | Spain | 10:02.55 | Q |
| 2 | Ava O'Connor | Ireland | 10:02.95 | Q |
| 3 | Gréta Varga | Hungary | 10:03.25 | Q |
| 4 | Ebba Cronholm | Sweden | 10:03.85 | Q |
| 5 | Sila Bayir | Turkey | 10:05.59 | Q |
| 6 | Tanya Bouet | France | 10:06.76 | q |
| 7 | Andriana Bontioti | Greece | 10:07.14 | |
| 8 | Carolin Hinrichs | Germany | 10:11.55 | |
| 9 | Saga Hagelin | Sweden | 10:14.36 | |
| 10 | Malin Rahm | Switzerland | 10:31.82 | |
| 11 | Ailish Hawkins | Ireland | 10:44.45 | |
| 12 | Beatriz Rios | Portugal | 10:46.50 | |
| 13 | Mihaela Blaga | Romania | 10:56.43 | |

=== Final ===
| Place | Athlete | Nation | Time | Notes |
|---|---|---|---|---|
| 1st place, gold medalist(s) | Ilona Mononen | Finland | 9:30.49 | |
| 2nd place, silver medalist(s) | Marta Serrano | Spain | 9:30.74 | |
| 3rd place, bronze medalist(s) | Adia Budde | Germany | 9:32.14 | PB |
| 4 | Pelinsu Şahin | Turkey | 9:37.35 | PB |
| 5 | Emily Parker | Great Britain | 9:45.64 | PB |
| 6 | Thea Charlotte Knutsen | Norway | 9:52.93 | PB |
| 7 | Gréta Varga | Hungary | 9:53.34 | PB |
| 8 | Ava O'Connor | Ireland | 9:54.35 | |
| 9 | Hanna Ackermann | Germany | 9:56.94 | |
| 10 | Sila Bayir | Turkey | 9:57.10 | |
| 11 | Clara Entresangle | France | 9:57.48 | PB |
| 12 | Vasiliki Kalimoyanni | Greece | 9:58.13 | |
| 13 | Ebba Cronholm | Sweden | 10:05.52 | |
| 14 | Martyna Krawczyńska | Poland | 10:06.90 | |
| 15 | Tanya Bouet | France | 10:14.87 | |
