= Aude Clavier =

French steeplechaser (born 1999)

Personal information
- Nationality: France
- Born: 5 February 1999 (27 years, 178 days old)
- Height: 172 cm (5 ft 8 in)
- Weight: 54 kg (119 lb)

Sport
- Sport: Sport of athletics
- Events: 3000 metres 3000 metres steeplechase
- Club: Décines Meyzieu Athlétisme; Amiens Université Club Athlétisme

Achievements and titles
- National finals: 2017 French U20 XC; • 5.8km XC, 12th; 2018 French U20s; • 2000m s'chase, 3rd (bronze); 2019 French U23s; • 3000m s'chase, 3rd (bronze); 2019 French Champs; • 3000m s'chase, 8th; 2020 French Indoors; • 3000m, 10th; 2021 French Indoors; • 1500m, 8th; 2021 French Champs; • 3000m s'chase, 4th; 2021 French XC; • 8.62km XC, 11th; 2023 French Indoors; • 3000m, 2nd (silver); • 1500m, DNF; 2023 French XC; • 4.51km XC, 3rd (bronze)
- Personal bests: 3000m: 9:07.92 sh (2023) 3000mSC: 9:34.07 (2023)
Medal record
Women's athletics
Representing France
European Cross Country Championships
| Silver medal – second place | 2021 Dublin | U23 team |
European U23 Championships
| Bronze medal – third place | 2023 Espoo | 3000 m s'chase |
- Updated on 4 April 2024

Aude Clavier (born 10 January 1999) is a French steeplechase runner. She won a bronze medal for France at the 2023 European U23 Championships in the 3000 metres steeplechase, and she finished runner-up behind Alice Finot at the 2023 French Indoor Championships over 3000 metres.

== Career ==
Clavier first represented France at the 2021 European Cross Country Championships in Dublin, where she finished 13th overall in the U23 race and contributed to her team's silver medal.

Clavier achieved her first senior national podium finish at the 2023 French Indoor Athletics Championships, finishing runner-up in the 3000 metres to Alice Finot. She also finished 3rd at the 2023 French Cross Country Championships one month later, though she was the second Frenchwoman as the winner Elise Vanderelst was competing as a foreign national from Belgium.

By virtue of her performances that year, Clavier was selected for the French team at the 2023 European Athletics U23 Championships. She won her first individual international medal, earning bronze in the 3000 metres steeplechase.

== Personal life ==
Clavier was a member of the Décines Meyzieu Athlétisme club in 2020, and she trained with Liv Westphal in Flagstaff, Arizona. In 2023, she became a member of the Amiens Université Club Athlétisme club in Amiens. She enjoys baking, and said that if she had not been an athlete she would have been a baker.

== Statistics ==
=== Personal best progression ===
3000m Steeplechase progression
| # | Mark | Pl. | Competition | Venue | Date | Ref. |
|---|---|---|---|---|---|---|
| 1 | 10:32.62 | 7th (Round B) | IFAM Outdoor, Putbosstadion | Oordegem, Belgium | 24 May 2019 | |
| 2 | 10:28.70 | 3rd place, bronze medalist(s) | Championnats de France Espoirs | Châteauroux, France | 29 Jun 2019 | |
| 3 | 9:59.47 | 4th | Manchester Invitational organised by Bryggen Sports | Manchester, Great Britain | 26 May 2021 | |
| 4 | 9:52.73 | 10th | Meeting National à Thème de Nice | Nice, France | 11 Jun 2021 | |
| 5 | 9:46.60 | 5th | Track Night Vienna | Wien, Austria | 16 Jun 2023 | |
| 6 | 9:34.07 | 4th | Míting Internacional D'Atletisme Ciutat De Barcelona | Barcelona, Spain | 4 Jul 2023 | |
