= 2026 European Athletics Championships – Women's 3000 metres steeplechase =

Women's 3000 metres steeplechase at the 2026 European Athletics Championships
- Venue: Alexander Stadium
- Location: Birmingham, United Kingdom
- Dates: 10 August 2026 (round 1); 13 August 2026 (final)
- Competitors: 34 (target)
- Winning time: 9:12.69

Medalists
gold medal	Gesa Felicitas Krause	Germany
silver medal	Alice Finot	France
bronze medal	Olivia Gürth	Germany

The women's 3000 metres steeplechase at the 2026 European Athletics Championships took place in two round at the Alexander Stadium in Birmingham, United Kingdom, on 10 and 13 August 2026.

== Records ==
Records before the 2026 European Athletics Championships
Record	Athlete (nation)	Time	Location	Date
World record	Beatrice Chepkoech (KEN)	8:44.32	Fontvieille, Monaco	20 July 2018
European record	Alice Finot (FRA)	8:58.67	Saint-Denis, France	6 August 2024
Championship record	Luiza Gega (ALB)	9:11.31	Munich, Germany	20 August 2022
World leading	Peruth Chemutai (UGA)	8:51.06	Xiamen, China	23 May 2026
European leading	Elise Thorner (GBR)	9:05.45	Glasgow, United Kingdom	29 July 2026

== Qualification ==
For the women's 3000 metres steeplechase, the qualification period was from 27 July 2025 to 26 July 2026. Athletes qualified by running the entry standard of 9:28.00 min or faster, by wildcard for the 2024 European Athletics Champion, or by their position on the World Athletics Rankings for the event. The target number was 34 athletes.

Qualification standings per 31 July 2026
QP	CP	Country	Athlete	PB	SB	Status	Details
1	1	France	Alice Finot	8:58.67	9:26.74	Qualified by Wild Card	Defending European Champion
2	1	Great Britain & N.I.	Elise Thorner	9:05.45	9:05.45	Qualified by Entry Standard	9:07.39 - Drake Stadium, Los Angeles, CA (USA) - 23 MAY 2026
3	1	Germany	Gesa Felicitas Krause	9:03.30	9:07.50	Qualified by Entry Standard	9:07.50 - Hayward Field, Eugene, OR (USA) - 04 JUL 2026
4	2	Germany	Lea Meyer	9:09.13	9:09.13	Qualified by Entry Standard	9:09.13 - Hayward Field, Eugene, OR (USA) - 04 JUL 2026
5	2	France	Flavie Renouard	9:14.69	9:21.79	Qualified by Entry Standard	9:14.69 - National Stadium, Tokyo (JPN) - 15 SEP 2025
6	1	Finland	Ilona Mononen	9:15.18	9:15.18	Qualified by Entry Standard	9:15.18 - Olympiastadion, Stockholm (SWE) - 07 JUN 2026
7	3	Germany	Olivia Gürth	9:15.17	9:21.73	Qualified by Entry Standard	9:15.28 - National Stadium, Tokyo (JPN) - 15 SEP 2025
8	3	France	Clara Entresangle	9:17.88	9:17.88	Qualified by Entry Standard	9:17.88 - Stade Raymond Troussier, Decines (FRA) - 04 JUL 2026
9	2	Great Britain & N.I.	Sarah Tait	9:18.66	9:40.92	Qualified by Entry Standard	9:18.66 - Putbosstadion, Oordegem (BEL) - 09 AUG 2025
10	1	Israel	Adva Cohen	9:19.90	9:28.81	Qualified by Entry Standard	9:19.90 - National Stadium, Tokyo (JPN) - 15 SEP 2025
11	1	Spain	Marta Serrano	9:21.00	9:29.44	Qualified by Entry Standard	9:21.00 - National Stadium, Tokyo (JPN) - 15 SEP 2025
12	1	Denmark	Juliane Hvid	9:23.12	9:23.12	Qualified by Entry Standard	9:23.12 - Paavo Nurmen Stadion, Turku (FIN) - 03 JUN 2026
13	1	Turkey	Tuğba Yenigün	9:23.41	9:33.26	Qualified by Entry Standard	9:23.41 - Putbosstadion, Oordegem (BEL) - 09 AUG 2025
14	1	Poland	Kinga Królik	9:22.14	9:31.51	Qualified by Entry Standard	9:24.92 - Zdzisław Krzyszkowiak Stadium, Bydgoszcz (POL) - 22 AUG 2025
15	2	Poland	Alicja Konieczek	9:16.51	9:47.42	Qualified by Entry Standard	9:26.12 - Zdzisław Krzyszkowiak Stadium, Bydgoszcz (POL) - 22 AUG 2025
reserve	4	Germany	Adia Budde	9:26.53	9:26.53	Qualified by Entry Standard	9:26.53 - Stadion De Veen, Heusden-Zolder (BEL) - 18 JUL 2026
16	1	Belgium	Eline Dalemans	9:25.80	10:01.74	Qualified by World Rankings	20th - 1186 points
17	3	Great Britain & N.I.	Stevie Lawrence-Wrist	9:32.03	9:32.03	Qualified by World Rankings	21st - 1185 points
18	3	Poland	Agnieszka Chorzępa	9:33.03	9:33.03	Qualified by World Rankings	23rd - 1180 points
19	2	Turkey	Sümeyye Erol	9:32.93	9:40.63	Qualified by World Rankings	24th - 1178 points
20	1	Moldova	Andreea Stavila-Grosu	9:37.17	9:37.17	Qualified by World Rankings	26th - 1176 points
21	1	Hungary	Zita Urbán	9:35.88	9:35.88	Qualified by World Rankings	27th - 1176 points
22	1	Norway	Andrea Nygård Vie	9:33.19	9:33.19	Qualified by World Rankings	28th - 1173 points
23	1	Sweden	Emilia Lillemo	9:28.99	9:46.23	Qualified by World Rankings	29th - 1169 points
24	3	Turkey	Derya Kunur	9:34.16	9:34.16	Qualified by World Rankings	30th - 1164 points
25	2	Norway	Vilde Våge Henriksen	9:40.58	9:40.58	Qualified by World Rankings	33rd - 1158 points
26	2	Denmark	Anna Mark Helwigh	9:48.58	9:48.58	Qualified by World Rankings	35th - 1154 points
27	1	Portugal	Laura Taborda	9:35.67	9:43.82	Qualified by World Rankings	36th - 1152 points
28	1	Ireland	Abbie Sheridan	9:43.69	9:43.69	Qualified by World Rankings	38th - 1146 points
29	1	Romania	Maria Mihaela Blaga	9:44.16	9:44.16	Qualified by World Rankings	41st - 1139 points
30	1	Switzerland	Shirley Lang	9:45.34	9:45.34	Qualified by World Rankings	42nd - 1139 points
31	1	Estonia	Laura Maasik	9:44.20	9:56.84	Qualified by World Rankings	45th - 1137 points
32	2	Finland	Alisa Virtanen	9:54.83	9:54.83	Qualified by World Rankings	49th - 1127 points
33	2	Sweden	Julia Samuelsson	9:44.36	9:51.75	Qualified by World Rankings	51st - 1126 points
34	1	Italy	Gaia Colli	9:54.06	10:02.03	Qualified by World Rankings	54th - 1124 points
reserve	1	Greece	Andriana Bontioti	9:58.82	9:59.40	Next best by World Rankings	56th - 1122 points
reserve	1	Austria	Lena Millonig	9:46.17	9:55.29	Next best by World Rankings	57th - 1121 points
reserve	2	Greece	Nikoleta Rafailaki	9:58.76	9:58.76	Next best by World Rankings	58th - 1119 points
reserve	2	Italy	Eleonora Curtabbi	9:40.90	10:03.77	Next best by World Rankings	67th - 1102 points
reserve	2	Hungary	Gabriella K. Szabó	10:00.82	10:11.73	Next best by World Rankings	75th - 1094 points
reserve	3	Italy	Maddalena Pizzamano	9:57.55	9:57.55	Next best by World Rankings	76th - 1092 points
reserve	2	Austria	Katharina Pesendorfer	10:00.16	10:05.23	Next best by World Rankings	77th - 1092 points
reserve	4	Italy	Francesca Mentasti	10:07.82	10:07.82	Next best by World Rankings	78th - 1090 points

Bye to semi-finals	Reserve activated	Withdrawal / reserve unused

== Schedule ==
Date	Time	Round
10 August 2026	21:00	Round 1
13 August 2026	20:29	Final

All times are local times (UTC+1)

== Results ==
=== Round 1 ===
Round 1 was held on 10 August 2026, at 21:00 in the evening. First 8 in each heat (Q) advanced to the final.

==== Heat 1 ====
Place	Athlete	Nation	Time	Notes
1	Lea Meyer	Germany	9:32.21	Q
2	Gesa Felicitas Krause	Germany	9:32.27	Q
3	Flavie Renouard	France	9:32.77	Q
4	Agnieszka Chorzępa	Poland	9:33.06	Q
5	Andreea Stavila	Moldova	9:34.40	Q, NR
6	Marta Serrano	Spain	9:34.79	Q
7	Zita Urbán	Hungary	9:35.57	Q, PB
8	Adva Cohen	Israel	9:37.15	Q
9	Juliane Hvid	Denmark	9:37.27	
10	Shirley Lang	Switzerland	9:45.01	PB
11	Emilia Lillemo	Sweden	9:53.20	
12	Sarah Tait	Great Britain & N.I.	9:55.17	
13	Andrea Nygård Vie	Norway	9:55.79	
14	Laura Maasik	Estonia	9:57.06	
15	Alisa Virtanen	Finland	9:57.19	
16	Sümeyre Erol	Turkey	10:05.71	

==== Heat 2 ====
Place	Athlete	Nation	Time	Notes
1	Elise Thorner	Great Britain & N.I.	9:32.40	Q
2	Ilona Mononen	Finland	9:32.55	Q
3	Alice Finot	France	9:32.58	Q
4	Olivia Gürth	Germany	9:32.65	Q
5	Clara Entresangle	France	9:32.89	Q
6	Alicja Konieczek	Poland	9:33.22	Q, SB
7	Tuğba Güvenç Yenigün	Turkey	9:33.27	Q
8	Kinga Królik	Poland	9:35.98	Q
9	Laura Taborda	Portugal	9:37.96	SB
10	Stevie Lawrence-Wrist	Great Britain & N.I.	9:48.66	
11	Vilde Våge Henriksen	Norway	9:49.45	
12	Anna Mark Helwigh	Denmark	9:51.20	
13	Derya Kunur	Turkey	9:54.68	
14	Abbie Sheridan	Ireland	9:57.50	
15	Julia Samuelsson	Sweden	10:04.96	
16	Mihaela Blaga	Romania	10:12.15	
17	Gaia Colli	Italy	10:18.90	

=== Final ===
The final was held on 13 August 2026, at 20:29 in the evening.

Place	Athlete	Nation	Time	Notes
1st place, gold medalist(s)	Gesa Felicitas Krause	Germany	9:12.69	
2nd place, silver medalist(s)	Alice Finot	France	9:14.24	SB
3rd place, bronze medalist(s)	Olivia Gürth	Germany	9:15.33	SB
4	Lea Meyer	Germany	9:17.07	
5	Elise Thorner	Great Britain & N.I.	9:18.14	
6	Clara Entresangle	France	9:21.03	
7	Flavie Renouard	France	9:21.88	
8	Ilona Mononen	Finland	9:25.62	
9	Agnieszka Chorzępa	Poland	9:36.14	
10	Adva Cohen	Israel	9:38.21	
11	Andreea Stavila	Moldova	9:40.71	
12	Marta Serrano	Spain	9:44.92	
13	Kinga Królik	Poland	9:46.06	
14	Alicja Konieczek	Poland	9:46.79	
15	Zita Urbán	Hungary	9:52.49	
16	Tuğba Güvenç Yenigün	Turkey	9:59.15	
