= France at the 2026 European Athletics Championships =

- Flag of France
- WA code: FRA

in Birmingham, United Kingdom 10–16 August 2026
- Competitors: 86 (50 men and 36 women)
- Medals Ranked 19th: Gold 0 Silver 3 Bronze 8 Total 11

European Athletics Championships appearances (overview)
- 1934; 1938; 1946; 1950; 1954; 1958; 1962; 1966; 1969; 1971; 1974; 1978; 1982; 1986; 1990; 1994; 1998; 2002; 2006; 2010; 2012; 2014; 2016; 2018; 2022; 2024; 2026

France competed at the 2026 European Athletics Championships in Birmingham, United Kingdom from 10–16 August 2026.

France finished 19th in the medal table, failing to win a single gold medal and concluding the championships with 3 silver and 8 bronze medals.

== Medallists ==
Medal	Name	Event	Date
Silver	Muhammad Abdallah Kounta	Men's 400 metres	12 August
Silver	Just Kwaou-Mathey	Men's 110 metres hurdles	12 August
Silver	Alice Finot	Women's 3000 metres steeplechase	13 August
Bronze	Etienne Daguinos	Men's 5000 metres	10 August
Bronze	Laëticia Bapté	Women's 100 metres hurdles	11 August
Bronze	Marie-Julie Bonnin	Women's pole vault	13 August
Bronze	Aurélien Quinion	Men's marathon race walk	15 August
Bronze	Baptiste Thiery	Men's pole vault	16 August
Bronze	Hilary Kpatcha	Women's long jump	16 August
Bronze	Jimmy Gressier	Men's 10,000 metres	16 August
Bronze	Valentin Gondouin; Emmanuel Roudolff Levisse; Hassan Chahdi; Felix Bour	Men's Marathon Team	16 August

== Results ==
France entered the following athletes.

Key

- Q = Qualified for the next round
- q = Qualified for the next round as a fastest loser or, in field events, by position without achieving the qualifying target
- NR = National record
- PB = Personal best
- SB = Season best
- N/A = Round not applicable for the event

=== Men ===
Track and road events

Athlete	Event	Heat		Semifinal		Final	
Athlete	Event	Result	Rank	Result	Rank	Result	Rank
Muhammad Abdallah Kounta	400 m	Bye		44.38 PB	1 Q	44.40	2nd place, silver medalist(s)
Yann Spillman	400 m	45.54	4 q	45.56	6	Did not advance	
Samuel Vessat	400 m	Bye		45.40	6	Did not advance	
Corentine Le Clezio	800 m	1:45.43	2 Q	1:43.80 PB	3 Q	1:46.24	7
Yanis Meziane	800 m	1:45.10	1 Q	1:44.03	6	Did not advance	
Louey Ouerrat	800 m	1:47.58	4	Did not advance			
Gabriel Tual	800 m	1:46.33	4 q	1:45.88	6	Did not advance	
Paul Anselmini	1500 m	3:36.84	7	—N/a		Did not advance	
Azeddine Habz	1500 m	3:36.03	3 Q	—N/a			
Romain Mornet	1500 m	3:41.95	6 Q	—N/a			
Etienne Daguinos	5000 m	—N/a				13:16.09	3rd place, bronze medalist(s)
Jimmy Gressier	5000 m	—N/a				13:16.36	4
Simon Bédard	10,000 m	—N/a					
Jimmy Gressier	10,000 m	—N/a					
Baptiste Guyon	10,000 m	—N/a					
Félix Bour	Marathon	—N/a					
Hassan Chahdi	Marathon	—N/a					
Valentin Gondouin	Marathon	—N/a					
Emmanuel Roudolff-Levisse	Marathon	—N/a					
Just Kwaou-Mathey	110 m hurdles	Bye		13.33	1 Q	13.16 SB	2nd place, silver medalist(s)
Theo Pedre	110 m hurdles	Bye		13.31	3 q	13.46	6
Thomas Wilkes	110 m hurdles	Bye		13.40	2 Q	13.36	4
Pierre Boudy	3000 m steeplechase	8:35.82	4 Q	—N/a			
Nicolas-Marie Daru	3000 m steeplechase	8:34.60	2 Q	—N/a			
Baptiste Fourmont	3000 m steeplechase	8:34.64	3 Q	—N/a			
Alexis Miellet	3000 m steeplechase	8:40.18	10	—N/a		Did not advance	
Kilian Lebreton	Half marathon walk	—N/a				1:28:22	13
Martin Madeline-Degy	Marathon walk	—N/a				3:08:12 SB	14
Aurélien Quinion	Marathon walk	—N/a				2:59:29 PB	3rd place, bronze medalist(s)
Jimy Soudril; Predea Manounou; Benoît Moudio Priso; Yann Spillman	4 × 400 m relay	DQ		—N/a		Did not advance	

Field events

Athlete	Event	Qualification		Final	
Athlete	Event	Distance	Position	Distance	Position
Mathieu Collet	Pole vault	5.60	8 q		
Thibaut Collet	Pole vault	NM		Did not advance	
Baptiste Thiery	Pole vault	5.60	5 q		
Erwan Konaté	Long jump	NM		Did not advance	
Thomas Gogois	Triple jump	16.31	7 q		
Jonathan Seremes	Triple jump	16.47	5 q		
Stephen Mailagi	Shot put	19.17	16	Did not advance	
Lolassonn Djouhan	Discus throw	63.10	7 q	62.28	11
Yann Chaussinand	Hammer throw	77.45	3 q	76.19	9
Felise Vaha'i Sosaia	Javelin throw	70.95	29	Did not advance	

Combined events – Decathlon

Athlete	Event	100 m	LJ	SP	HJ	400 m	110H	DT	PV	JT	1500 m	Final	Rank
Antoine Ferranti	Result	11.37	7.39	13.09	2.05	48.22 PB	14.72	39.24	5.00	60.23 SB	4:15.81	8134	10
Antoine Ferranti	Points	780	908	673	850	899	884	649	910	741	840	8134	10
Makenson Gletty	Result	10.80	7.20	15.65	2.02 SB	48.13	14.18	41.60	4.60	60.07	4:26.11 SB	8270	6
Makenson Gletty	Points	906	862	830	822	903	951	697	790	739	770	8270	6

=== Women ===
Track and road events

Athlete	Event	Heat		Semifinal		Final	
Athlete	Event	Result	Rank	Result	Rank	Result	Rank
Gémima Joseph	200 m	Bye		22.68	2 Q	22.63	5
Isabelle Black	400 m	Bye		50.72	3	Did not advance	
Anaïs Bourgoin	800 m	1:59.19	3 Q	1:58.84	2 Q	2:00.65	9
Rénelle Lamote	800 m	1:58.65	5 q	1:59.88	5	Did not advance	
Clara Liberman	800 m	1:58.23 PB	6 Q	1:58.19 PB	5 q	2:01.84	10
Adèle Gay	1500 m	4:10.56	5 Q	—N/a			
Agathe Guillemot	1500 m	4:08.17	3 Q	—N/a			
Augustine Haquet	1500 m	4:08.98	6 Q	—N/a			
Alessia Zarbo	10,000 m	—N/a				33:13.10	21
Sacha Alessandrini	100 m hurdles	Bye		12.89	3 q	12.92	6
Laëticia Bapté	100 m hurdles	Bye		12.77	3 q	12.73	3rd place, bronze medalist(s)
Louise Maraval	400 m hurdles	Bye		54.50	3 q	54.88	8
Méta Tumba	400 m hurdles	56.57	15	Did not advance			
Clara Entresangle	3000 m steeplechase	9:32.89	5 Q	—N/a		9:21.03	6
Alice Finot	3000 m steeplechase	9:32.58	3 Q	—N/a		9:14.21 SB	2nd place, silver medalist(s)
Flavie Renouard	3000 m steeplechase	9:32.77	3 Q	—N/a		9:21.88	7
Clémence Beretta	Half marathon walk	—N/a				1:34.10 PB	7
Ana Delahaie	Half marathon walk	—N/a				1:33:32 PB	6
Pauline Stey	Half marathon walk	—N/a				1:31:12 PB	4
Camille Moutard	Marathon walk	—N/a				3:31:56 PB	6
Isabelle Black; Orianne Chéry; Marina Lasserre; Louise Maraval	4 × 400 m relay	3:26.44	3 Q	—N/a			

Field events

Athlete	Event	Qualification		Final	
Athlete	Event	Distance	Position	Distance	Position
Solène Gicquel	High jump	1.91	13 Q		
Marie-Julie Bonnin	Pole vault	4.50	1 q	4.70	3rd place, bronze medalist(s)
Margot Chevrier	Pole vault	4.50	6 q	4.60 SB	4
Bérénice Petit	Pole vault	4.40	8 q	4.45	7
Rogilia-Chriss Bissemo	Long jump	6.33	23	Did not advance	
Yanis David	Long jump	6.61	12 q		
Hilary Kpatcha	Long jump	6.88	5 Q		
Ilionis Guillaume	Triple jump	13.67	19	Did not advance	
Mélina Robert-Michon	Discus throw	60.89	7 q	60.58	9
Rose Loga	Hammer throw	63.80	25	Did not advance	
Alizée Minard	Javelin throw	58.26	8 q		

=== Mixed ===
Track and road events

Athlete	Event	Final	
Athlete	Event	Result	Rank
Samuel Vessat; Benedetta Kouakou; Benoît Moudio Priso; Isabelle Black	Mixed 4 × 400 m	3:15.85	7
