= Laureen Maxwell =

French high jumper (born 2002)

Personal information
- Nationality: France
- Born: 23 May 2002 (24 years, 71 days old) French Guiana
- Home town: Paris

Sport
- Sport: Athletics
- Events: High jump 100 metres hurdles
- Club: Athle 91; SCA 2000 Evry

Achievements and titles
- World finals: 2021 World U20s; • High jump, T-12th
- National finals: 2019 French Indoors; • High jump, 8th; 2019 French Indoor U18s; • High jump, 3rd (bronze); 2019 French U18s; • High jump, 1st (gold); 2020 French Indoor U20s; • High jump, 1st (gold); • 60m hurdles, 4th; 2020 French Indoors; • High jump, 4th; 2020 French Champs; • High jump, 11th; 2021 French Indoors; • High jump, 3rd (bronze); 2021 French Champs; • High jump, 1st (gold); 2021 French U20s; • 100m hurdles, 1st (gold); • High jump, 3rd (bronze); 2022 French Champs; • High jump, 8th; 2022 French U23s; • 100m hurdles, DQ; 2023 French Indoor U23s; • High jump, 1st (gold); 2023 French Indoors; • High jump, NH; 2023 French U23s; • High jump, 2nd (silver); 2023 French Champs; • High jump, 7th
- Personal bests: HJ: 1.91m (2021); 100mH: 13.61 (+0.2) (2021)
- Updated on 29 December 2023

Laureen Maxwell (born 23 May 2002) is a French high jumper originally from French Guiana. She was the 2021 French Athletics Championships winner in the high jump.

== Biography ==
Maxwell was born in French Guiana, but she later moved to Paris. She trains with the Athlé 91 club and SCA 2000 Évry.

Maxwell won her first senior national title at the 2021 French Athletics Championships in a personal best of 1.91 m, which was also the 3rd-best European U20 performance of the year to date. At the 2021 World U20 Championships, Maxwell qualified for the final and tied for 12th place.

In the winter of 2022, Maxwell fractured her patellar tendon bone. Then later in the fall, she sprained her ankle, having to spend four weeks on crutches.

Despite this, she was able to recover and win the 2023 Meeting National À Thème En Salle D'hirson indoor meeting in Hirson on 28 January 2023. She attempted to clear 1.92 m to set a meeting record, but had to settle with a 1.85 m winning mark. Maxwell went on to win the 2023 French Athletics Indoor U23 championships in Miramas with a jump of 1.81 metres.

During the 2023 outdoor season, Maxwell placed 7th at the 2023 French Athletics Championships and 9th at the European U23 Championships.

== Statistics ==
=== Personal bests ===
Event	Mark	Place	Competition	Venue	Date	Ref
High jump	1.91 m	1st place, gold medalist(s)	French Athletics Championships	Angers, France	27 June 2021	
100 metres hurdles	13.61 (+0.2 m/s)	(bronze) (round B)	Meeting Elite de Cergy-Pontoise	Pontoise, France	16 June 2021	
