= Camille Séri =

French hurdler (born 1999)

Personal information
- Nationality: French
- Born: 1 May 1999 (age 27) Suresnes, France
- Home town: Nice, France
- Height: 155 cm (5 ft 1 in)
- Weight: 49 kg (108 lb)

Sport
- Sport: Athletics
- Events: 400 metres hurdles 400 metres
- Club: Nice Côte d'Azur Athlétisme

Achievements and titles
- National finals: 2015 French U18s; • Long jump, 6th; 2016 French U18s; • Long jump, 2nd (silver); • 400m hurdles, 3rd (bronze); 2017 French U20s; • 400m hurdles, 2nd (silver); • Long jump, 11th; 2018 French U20s; • 400m hurdles, 3rd (bronze); 2019 French U23s; • 400m hurdles, 5th; 2019 French Champs; • 400m hurdles, 4th; 2021 French Champs; • 400m hurdles, 2nd (silver); 2022 French Indoors; • 400m, 1st (gold); 2022 French Champs; • 400m hurdles, 1st (gold); 2023 French Indoors; • 400m, 1st (gold); 2023 French Champs; • 400m hurdles, 2nd (silver)
- Personal bests
Medal record
Women's athletics
Representing France
European U23 Championships
Bronze medal – third place	2021 Tallinn	4 × 400 m relay
Mediterranean Games
Silver medal – second place	2022 Oran	400 m hurdles
- Updated on 15 January 2024

Camille Séri (French pronunciation: [kamij seʁi]; born 1 May 1999) is a French hurdler specializing in the 400 metres hurdles. She was the silver medalist in the 400 m hurdles at the 2022 Mediterranean Games, and finished ninth at the 2023 World Athletics Championships in the 4 × 400 m relay.

== Biography ==
Séri is from Nice, France where she represents the Nice Cote D'azur Athletisme athletics club.

In July 2017, Séri gained her first international championship experience at the U20 European Championships in Grosseto, where she was eliminated in the semifinals of the 400 meters hurdles. In June 2021, Séri took silver in the 400 meters hurdles at the French Championships in Angers. The following month, she was part of France's relay team along with Sokhna Lacoste, Louise Maraval, and Shana Grebo that took silver in the 4×400 meters at the U23 European Championships in Tallinn.

In February 2022, Séri won gold in the 400 meters at the French Indoor Championships in Miramas. In June 2022, she also won gold in the 400 meters hurdles at the French Championships in Caen. The following month, Séri took silver in the 400 meters hurdles at the Mediterranean Games in Oran, finishing behind the Italian Rebecca Sartori. In August 2022, she competed at the European Championships in Munich and reached the semifinals in the 400 meters hurdles.

In February 2023, Séri won her second consecutive gold in the 400 meters at the French Indoor Championships in Aubière. In July 2023, she took silver in the 400 meters hurdles at the French Championships in Albi, being defeated by Louise Maraval. In August 2023, at the World Championships in Budapest, Séri was part of the French relay team that finished ninth in the 4×400 meters.

== Statistics ==
=== Best performances ===
Event	Mark	Place	Competition	Venue	Date	Ref
400 metres hurdles	55.79	(gold) (Round B)	IFAM Oordegem	Oordegem, Belgium	28 May 2022	
400 metres	52.48 sh	1st place, gold medalist(s)	French Indoor Athletics Championships	Aubière, France	19 February 2023	
