= Athletics at the 2025 Summer World University Games – Women's 3000 metres steeplechase =

Women's 3000 metres steeplechase at the 2025 Summer World University Games
- Venue: Lohrheidestadion
- Location: Bochum, Germany
- Dates: 25 July (heats); 27 July (final)
- Competitors: 22 from 14 nations
- Winning time: 9:31.86

Medalists
gold medal	Ilona Mononen	Finland
silver medal	Ankita Dhyani	India
bronze medal	Adia Budde	Germany

The women's 3000 metres steeplechase event at the 2025 Summer World University Games was held in Bochum, Germany, at Lohrheidestadion on 25 and 27 July.

== Records ==
Prior to the competition, the records were as follows:

Record	Athlete (nation)	Time (s)	Location	Date
Games record	Ekaterina Sokolenko (RUS)	9:25.77	Gwangju, South Korea	10 July 2015

== Results ==
=== Heats ===
First 8 in each heat (Q) qualified for the final.

==== Heat 1 ====
Place	Athlete	Nation	Time	Notes
1	Ankita Dhyani	India	9:54.79	Q
2	Ayana Yamashita	Japan	9:57.09	Q
3	Ruken Tek	Turkey	10:05.17	Q
4	Andreea Stavila	Moldova	10:05.72	Q
5	Ilona Mononen	Finland	10:07.94	Q
6	Gabriella K. Szabó	Hungary	10:09.20	Q
7	Carolin Hinrichs	Germany	10:09.98	Q
8	Amelia Wills	Great Britain	10:14.15	Q
9	Eva Pringle	New Zealand	10:19.59	
10	Synne Engebretsen	Norway	10:27.01	
11	Georgia Bernhard	Canada	10:34.56	PB

==== Heat 2 ====
Place	Athlete	Nation	Time	Notes
1	Ava O'Connor	Ireland	9:50.21	Q
2	Andrea Modin Engesæth	Norway	9:58.23	Q, SB
3	Maisie Grice	Great Britain	9:59.05	Q, SB
4	Zita Urbán	Hungary	9:59.09	Q
5	Adia Budde	Germany	9:59.52	Q
6	Pelinsu Şahin	Turkey	10:00.65	Q
7	Alisa Virtanen	Finland	10:07.94	Q
8	Mihaela Blaga	Romania	10:12.95	Q
9	Marisha Thompson	Canada	10:21.23	
10	Manju Yadav	India	11:24.71	
11	Berit Guzas	Estonia	11:29.68	SB

=== Final ===
Place	Athlete	Nation	Time	Notes
1st place, gold medalist(s)	Ilona Mononen	Finland	9:31.86	
2nd place, silver medalist(s)	Ankita Dhyani	India	9:31.99	PB
3rd place, bronze medalist(s)	Adia Budde	Germany	9:33.34	
4	Ruken Tek	Turkey	9:36.89	PB
5	Pelinsu Şahin	Turkey	9:44.19	
6	Zita Urbán	Hungary	9:44.62	PB
7	Andreea Stavila	Moldova	9:47.66	SB
8	Maisie Grice	Great Britain	9:50.56	SB
9	Ava O'Connor	Ireland	9:51.07	
10	Ayana Yamashita	Japan	9:54.49	PB
11	Andrea Modin Engesæth	Norway	9:55.67	PB
12	Carolin Hinrichs	Germany	9:57.09	
13	Alisa Virtanen	Finland	9:57.29	PB
14	Amelia Wills	Great Britain	10:07.14	PB
15	Gabriella K. Szabó	Hungary	10:07.23	
16	Mihaela Blaga	Romania	10:34.84	
