= 2021 European Athletics U23 Championships – Women's 3000 metres steeplechase =

Women's 3000 metres steeplechase at the 2021 European Athletics U23 Championships
- Venue: Kadriorg Stadium, Tallinn
- Dates: 8, 10 July
- Competitors: 31 from 16 nations
- Winning time: 9:51.02

Medalists
gold medal	Flavie Renouard	France
silver medal	Kinga Królik	Poland
bronze medal	Aude Clavier	France

The women's 3000 metres steeplechase event at the 2021 European Athletics U23 Championships was held in Tallinn, Estonia, at Kadriorg Stadium on 8 and 10 July.

== Records ==
Prior to the competition, the records were as follows:

European U23 record	Anna Emilie Møller (DEN)	9:13.46	Doha, Qatar	30 September 2019
Championship U23 record	Anna Emilie Møller (DEN)	9:27.31	Gävle, Sweden	13 July 2019

== Results ==
=== Round 1 ===
Qualification rule: First 5 in each heat (Q) and the next 5 fastest (q) advance to the Final.

Rank	Heat	Name	Nationality	Time	Notes
1	2	Claire Palou	France	10:03.89	Q
2	2	Aude Clavier	France	10:03.92	Q
3	2	June Arbeo	Spain	10:04.13	Q
4	1	Flavie Renouard	France	10:04.44	Q
5	1	Kinga Królik	Poland	10:04.61	Q
6	1	Andrea Modin Engesæth	Norway	10:05.22	Q
7	1	Greta Karinauskaitė	Lithuania	10:05.22	Q
8	2	Sibylle Häring	Switzerland	10:05.92	Q
9	2	Laura Taborda	Portugal	10:06.42	Q, PB
10	1	Sarah Tait	Great Britain	10:06.71	Q
11	2	Paula Schneiders	Germany	10:08.00	q
12	2	Julia Samuelsson	Sweden	10:09.58	q, PB
13	2	Elise Thorner	Great Britain	10:11.28	q
14	1	Emilia Lillemo	Sweden	10:12.70	q
15	2	Vilde Våge Henriksen	Norway	10:13.75	q, PB
16	1	Carmen Viciosa	Spain	10:13.95	
17	1	Lisa Vogelgesang	Germany	10:15.04	
18	2	Anna Helwigh-Mark	Denmark	10:16.42	
19	1	Derya Kunur	Turkey	10:19.79	
20	1	Kristin Svendby Otervik	Norway	10:20.42	PB
21	2	Lotte Seiler	Austria	10:24.52	PB
22	2	Ruken Tek	Turkey	10:30.87	
23	1	Karin Gošek	Slovenia	10:31.03	PB
24	1	Kader Güvenç	Turkey	10:33.45	
25	1	Laura Astrup	Denmark	10:34.30	
26	1	Boglárka Mógor	Hungary	10:34.62	
27	2	Linda Palumbo	Italy	10:35.89	
28	2	Emilia Mikszuta	Poland	10:36.10	
29	2	Maite González	Spain	10:39.34	
30	1	Bárbara Neiva	Portugal	10:39.51	
31	1	Katharina Pesendorfer	Austria	10:44.81	

=== Final ===
Rank	Name	Nationality	Time	Notes
1st place, gold medalist(s)	Flavie Renouard	France	9:51.02	
2nd place, silver medalist(s)	Kinga Królik	Poland	9:52.59	
3rd place, bronze medalist(s)	Aude Clavier	France	9:58.58	
4	Andrea Modin Engesæth	Norway	10:03.50	
5	Sarah Tait	Great Britain	10:04.53	
6	Greta Karinauskaitė	Lithuania	10:05.84	
7	Paula Schneiders	Germany	10:11.67	
8	Elise Thorner	Great Britain	10:12.41	
9	Sibylle Häring	Switzerland	10:16.94	
10	Julia Samuelsson	Sweden	10:19.76	
11	Laura Taborda	Portugal	10:23.39	
12	June Arbeo	Spain	10:24.08	
13	Emilia Lillemo	Sweden	10:26.34	
	Claire Palou	France	DNF	
	Vilde Våge Henriksen	Norway	DNF	
