= 2021 French Indoor Athletics Championships =

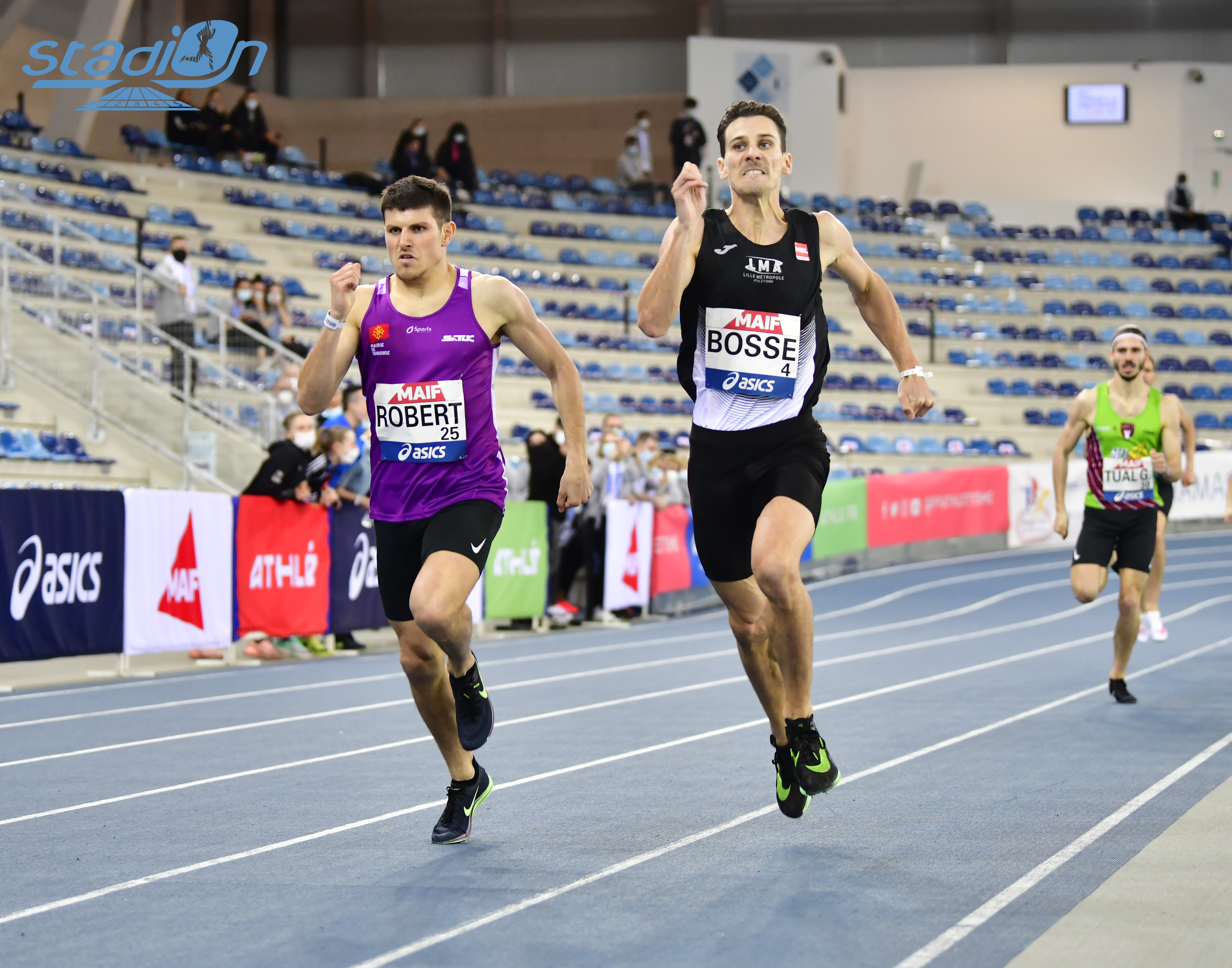
- Benjamin Robert and Pierre-Ambroise Bosse compete in the 800 m
- Edition: 50th
- Dates: 19–21 February
- Host city: Miramas
- Venue: Stadium Miramas Métropole
- Events: 28

The 2021 French Indoor Athletics Championships was the 50th edition of the national championship in indoor track and field for France, organised by the French Athletics Federation. It was held on 19–21 February at the Stadium Miramas Métropole in Miramas. A total of 28 events (divided evenly between the sexes) were contested over the three-day competition.

Due to restrictions following the COVID-19 pandemic, the championships was not held before the public and only professional and nationally listed athletes were allowed to compete.

== Programme ==
Finals	19 February	20 February	21 February
Men	3000 m, 5000 m walk, long jump	Heptathlon, triple jump, high jump, shot put, 400 m, 800 m, 60 m	Heptathlon, pole vault, 1500 m, 60 m hurdles, 200 m
Women	3000 m, 3000 m walk	60 m, 400 m, 800 m, long jump, pole vault, shot put, 60 m hurdles	Pentathlon, triple jump, high jump, 1500 m, 200 m

== Results ==
=== Men ===
Event	Gold		Silver		Bronze	
60 metres	Mouhamadou Fall	6.64	Amaury Golitin	6.64	Jeremy Leroux	6.69
200 metres	Loïc Prévot	21.37	Gautier Dautremer	21.45	Pablo Matéo	21.46
400 metres	Thomas Jordier	46.13	Nicolas Courbière	46.94	Téo Andant	47.03
800 metres	Benjamin Robert	1:46.06	Pierre-Ambroise Bosse	1:46.16	Gabriel Tual	1:47.54
1500 metres	Djilali Bedrani	3:40.27	Azeddine Habz	3:40.30	Baptiste Mischler	3:40.31
3000 metres	Hugo Hay	7:52.42	Yann Schrub	7:55.13	Mehdi Belhadj	7:58.09
5000 m walk	Aurélien Quinion	19:51.20	David Kuster	20:07.49	Matteo Duc	20:18.46
60 m hurdles	Wilhem Belocian	7.46	Aurel Manga	7.58	Matteo Ngo	7.72
High jump	Sébastien Micheau	2.19 m	Matthieu Tomassi	2.16 m	Taylor Minos	2.16 m
Pole vault	Valentin Lavillenie	5.77 m	Ethan Cormont	5.72 m	Renaud Lavillenie	5.66 m
Long jump	Jean-Pierre Bertrand	7.83 m	Yann Randrianasolo	7.68 m	Julien Pauthonnier	7.55 m
Triple jump	Melvin Raffin	17.09 m	Enzo Hodebar	16.66 m	Yoann Rapinier	16.48 m
Shot put	Frédéric Dagée	19.39 m	Antoine Duponchel	18.27 m	Jordan Guehaseim	16.89 m
Heptathlon	Jérémy Lelièvre	5863 pts	Romain Martin	5805 pts	Tristan Marcy	5630 pts

=== Women ===
Event	Gold		Silver		Bronze	
60 metres	Cynthia Leduc	7.24	Nasrane Bacar	7.41	Eloïse de la Taille	7.42
200 metres	Estelle Raffai	23.63	Brigitte Ntiamoah	23.64	Wided Atatou	23.66
400 metres	Amandine Brossier	52.74	Kalyl Amaro	53.27	Shana Grebo	53.29
800 metres	Léna Kandissounon	2:05.56	Noélie Yarigo	2:05.56	Charlotte Mouchet	2:08.45
1500 metres	Claire Palou	4:12.62	Aurore Fleury	4:13.69	Alexa Lemitre	4:13.94
3000 metres	Alice Finot	9:12.33	Manon Trapp	9:14.87	Leila Hadji	9:23.59
3000 m walk	Eloïse Terrec	12:46.12	Pauline Stey	12:48.98	Camille Moutard	12:51.89
60 m hurdles	Laëticia Bapté	7.93	Cyréna Samba-Mayela	7.94	Fanny Quenot	8.07
High jump	Solène Gicquel	1.86 m	Claire Orcel	1.84 m	Laureen Maxwell Aicha Moumin	1.82 m
Pole vault	Elina Giallurachis	4.41 m	Margot Chevrier	4.21 m	Thiziri Daci	4.11 m
Long jump	Hilary Kpatcha	6.54 m	Rougui Sow	6.32 m	Maëlly Dalmat	6.30 m
Triple jump	Rougui Sow	13.96 m	Jeanine Assani Issouf	13.73 m	Anne-Suzanna Fosther-Katta	13.00 m
Shot put	Amanda Ngandu-Ntumba	16.24 m	Caroline Métayer	15.55 m	Antoinette Nana Djimou	14.53 m
Pentathlon	Célia Perron	4434 pts	Diane Marie-Hardy	4380 pts	Annaelle Nyabeu Djapa	4337 pts
