= Flavie Renouard =

French steeplechase runner (born 2000)

- At the 2026 Weltklasse Zürich

Personal information
- Born: 10 September 2000 (age 26) Caen, France
- Home town: Caen, Calvados, France
- Education: University of Caen Normandy (Institut d'Administration des Entreprises)
- Height: 169 cm (5 ft 7 in)
- Weight: 53 kg (117 lb)

Sport
- Country: France
- Sport: Athletics
- Events: 3000 metres steeplechase 2000 metres steeplechase
- Club: Entente Athletic Mondeville-Hérouville; Caen Athletic Club
- Coached by: Tim Moriau

Achievements and titles
- National finals: 2017 French U18s; • 1500m, 4th; 2018 French U20s; • 1500m, 10th; 2019 French U20s; • 2000m s'chase, 5th; 2020 French Indoors; • 1500m, 7th; 2020 French Champs; • 3000m s'chase, 2nd (silver); 2021 French Indoors; • 3000m, 8th; 2021 French Champs; • 3000m s'chase, 1st (gold); 2021 French XC; • 8.62km XC, 3rd (bronze); 2022 French Champs; • 3000m s'chase, 2nd (silver); 2023 French Champs; • 3000m s'chase, 2nd (silver)
- Personal bests: 3000mSC: 9:19.07 (2023) 2000mSC: 6:16.74 (2023)
Medal record
Women's athletics
Representing France
European Cross Country Championships
Bronze medal – third place	2019 Lisbon	U20 team
Silver medal – second place	2021 Dublin	U23 team
Bronze medal – third place	2022 Turin	U23 team
European U23 Championships
Gold medal – first place	2021 Tallinn	3000 m steeplechase
Mediterranean U23 Championships
Gold medal – first place	2022 Pescara	3000 m steeplechase
- Updated on 20 February 2024

Flavie Renouard (born 10 September 2000) is a French steeplechase runner specializing in the 3000 metres steeplechase. She is the 2021 French Athletics Championships winner and a gold medallist at the 2022 Mediterranean Athletics U23 Championships and 2021 European U23 Championships. Her time of 9:19.07 at the 2023 Anniversary Games qualified her for the 2024 Summer Olympics.

== Career ==
Renouard's athletics career began in 2016 as a 1500 metres runner. In 2017, she finished 4th at the French U18 Championships in that event, followed by finishing 10th at the 2018 French U20 Championships. She improved back to 5th at the 2019 French U20 Championships, and a 2nd-place finish at the Cross National du Val-de-Marne - Ile de France earned her selection to represent France at the 2019 European Cross Country Championships in the U20 race. At the championships, she finished 10th overall and contributed to her team's bronze medal.

After finishing 7th in the 1500 m at the 2020 French Indoor Athletics Championships, Renouard debuted in the 3000 m steeplechase in August 2020 and quickly improved, finishing 2nd at the 2020 French Athletics Championships. She won her first national title at the 2021 French Athletics Championships in the steeplechase – her fifth ever – qualifying her for the 2021 European Athletics U23 Championships. At the championships, she won her semi-final and then won the gold medal in the final, beating Kinga Królik by one second. She stayed in third or fourth place for most of the race, and accelerated with 800 metres to go. She finished the season by placing 18th at the 2021 European Cross Country Championships U23 race, earning her team a silver medal.

In 2022, Renouard finished runner-up at the French Championships and represented France at the 2022 Mediterranean Games, where she finished 6th. Though she did not advance to the finals at her first European Championships, she qualified for the 2022 Mediterranean Athletics U23 Championships where she won the gold medal by 15 seconds. In her final U23 race at the 2022 European Cross Country Championships, she finished 17th and contributed to a French bronze medal.

Renoard's 2023 indoor season was cut short by a knee injury, delaying her start to racing by five months. Renouard finished 2nd at the 2023 European Athletics Team Championships First Division, though because her time was slower than the Super League 3rd-placer, she did not win a 2023 European Games medal which the competition doubled as. With a new personal best of 9:19.07 at the 2023 Anniversary Games, she qualified for her first World Championships later that summer. The time also surpassed the qualifying standard for the 2024 Summer Olympics, guaranteeing her a spot assuming three other French women do not meet the standard ahead of her. At the Worlds steeplechase, Renouard finished 9th in her semi-final and did not advance.

== Personal life ==
After initially playing basketball for ten years, Renouard discovered athletics by running cross country at the Cross Scolaire organized by the Département du Calvados, which she won in 2015. She is from Caen, France and she attends the University of Caen Normandy, where she studied STAPS through the Institut d'Administration des Entreprises program and is currently studying for her master's degree. Once a member of Entente Athletic Mondeville-Hérouville, by 2022 she had changed her club membership to Caen AC.

== Statistics ==
=== Personal best progression ===
3000m Steeplechase progression
#	Mark	Pl.	Competition	Venue	Date	Ref.
1	9:56.64	3rd place, bronze medalist(s)	Meeting National á Thème de L'est Lyonnais	Décines-Charpieu, France	28 Aug 2020	
2	9:45.08	1st place, gold medalist(s)	Meeting National á Thème de L'est Lyonnais	Décines-Charpieu, France	18 Jun 2021	
3	9:36.59	3rd place, bronze medalist(s)	BoXX United Manchester World Athletics Continental Tour	Manchester, Great Britain	2 Jun 2022	
4	9:29.10	3rd place, bronze medalist(s)	Míting Internacional D'Atletisme Ciutat De Barcelona	Barcelona, Spain	4 Jul 2023	
5	9:19.07	5th	London Athletics Meet	London, Great Britain	22 Jul 2023	
