= 2023 European Athletics U23 Championships – Women's 3000 metres steeplechase =

Women's 3000 metres steeplechase at the 2023 European Athletics U23 Championships
- Venue: Leppävaara Stadium
- Location: Espoo, Finland
- Dates: 13 July (heats); 15 July (final)
- Competitors: 29 from 16 nations
- Winning time: 9:26.98

Medalists
gold medal	Olivia Gürth	Germany
silver medal	Greta Karinauskaitė	Lithuania
bronze medal	Marta Serrano	Spain

The women's 3000 metres steeplechase event at the 2023 European Athletics U23 Championships was held in Espoo, Finland, at Leppävaara Stadium on 13 and 15 July.

== Records ==
Prior to the competition, the records were as follows:

European U23 record	Anna Emilie Møller (DEN)	9:13.46	Doha, Qatar	30 September 2019
Championship U23 record	Anna Emilie Møller (DEN)	9:27.31	Gävle, Sweden	13 July 2019

== Results ==
=== Heats ===
Qualification rules: First 8 in each heat (Q) will qualify for the final.

Rank	Heat	Name	Country	Time	Notes
1	1	Elise Thorner	Great Britain	9:52.95	Q
2	1	Agnieszka Chorzępa	Poland	9:54.14	Q, PB
3	1	Soňa Kouřilová	Czech Republic	9:56.25	Q, PB
4	1	Julia Koralewska	Poland	9:57.56	Q
5	1	Marta Serrano	Spain	9:59.81	Q
6	1	Shirley Lang	Switzerland	10:00.96	Q, PB
7	1	Ava O'Connor	Ireland	10:02.92	Q, PB
8	2	Ruken Tek	Turkey	10:04.96	Q
9	2	Greta Karinauskaitė	Lithuania	10:05.27	Q
10	2	Olivia Gürth	Germany	10:06.11	Q
11	2	Sarah Tait	Great Britain	10:06.35	Q
12	2	Nara Elipe	Spain	10:06.62	Q, PB
13	2	Iraia Mendia	Spain	10:06.74	Q
14	2	Emilia Mikszuta	Poland	10:07.59	Q, PB
15	2	Anna Málková	Czech Republic	10:07.59	Q
16	2	Şevval Özdoğan	Turkey	10:10.14	
17	1	Kim Bödi	Germany	10:13.81	Q
18	2	Janette Vänttinen	Finland	10:16.79	PB
19	1	Gréta Varga	Hungary	10:18.73	SB
20	2	Sara Busic	Norway	10:18.98	PB
21	2	Agnese Carcano	Italy	10:19.17	PB
22	1	Maddalena Pizzamano	Italy	10:20.26	PB
23	1	Kristin Svendby Otervik	Norway	10:23.34	
24	2	Tetiana Kohut	Ukraine	10:27.14	SB
25	1	Pelinsu Şahin	Turkey	10:31.36	
26	1	Evelīna Krista Sitnika	Latvia	10:33.34	
27	1	Lotte Seiler	Austria	10:42.81	
28	2	Silvia Gradizzi	Italy	10:45.71	
29	1	Sigrid Alvik	Norway	10:50.95	

=== Final ===
Rank	Name	Country	Time	Notes
1st place, gold medalist(s)	Olivia Gürth	Germany	9:26.98	CR
2nd place, silver medalist(s)	Greta Karinauskaitė	Lithuania	9:30.96	
3rd place, bronze medalist(s)	Marta Serrano	Spain	9:41.47	
4	Elise Thorner	Great Britain	9:47.85	
5	Julia Koralewska	Poland	9:54.16	
6	Sarah Tait	Great Britain	9:54.74	PB
7	Agnieszka Chorzępa	Poland	9:56.08	
8	Ava O'Connor	Ireland	10:01.34	PB
9	Ruken Tek	Turkey	10:02.35	
10	Soňa Kouřilová	Czech Republic	10:06.21	
11	Iraia Mendia	Spain	10:14.55	
12	Nara Elipe	Spain	10:16.77	
13	Shirley Lang	Switzerland	10:18.27	
14	Anna Málková	Czech Republic	10:19.89	
15	Emilia Mikszuta	Poland	10:23.67	
16	Kim Bödi	Germany	10:47.90	
