= Aleksandra Formella =

Polish athlete (born 2001)

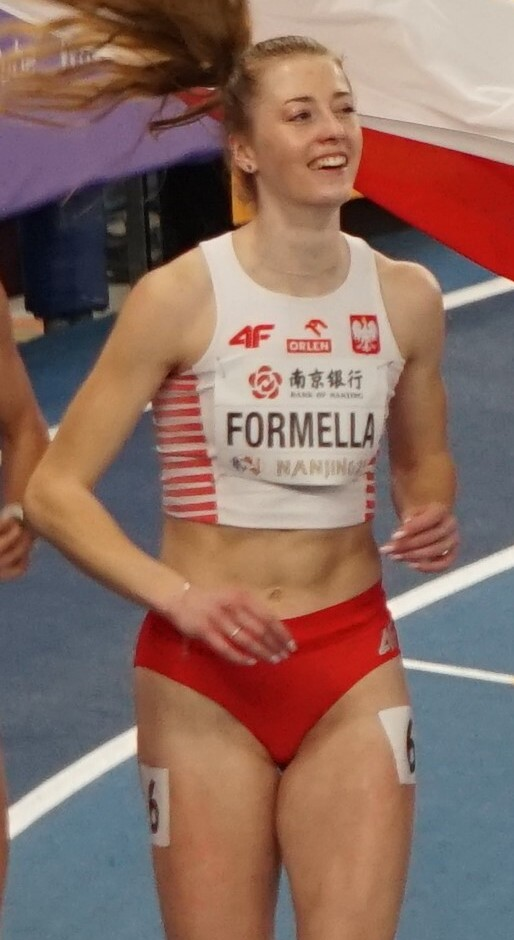
- Aleksandra Formella in 2025

Personal information
- Nationality: Polish
- Born: 27 October 2001 (age 24)

Sport
- Sport: Athletics
- Event: Sprint

Achievements and titles
- Personal bests: 400 m 52.10 (Sopot, 2024); 800 m: 2:01.53 (Toruń, 2025)
Medal record
Women's athletics
Representing Poland
World Indoor Championships
Silver medal – second place	2025 Nanjing	4×400 m relay
European U23 Championships
Bronze medal – third place	2021 Tallinn	4×400 m relay
European U20 Championships
Bronze medal – third place	2019 Borås	4×400 m relay
World University Games
Gold medal – first place	2021 Chengdu	4×400 m relay
Gold medal – first place	2025 Bochum	4×400 m relay mixed
Silver medal – second place	2025 Bochum	4×400 m relay

Aleksandra Formella (born 27 October 2001) is a Polish sprinter and middle-distance runner.

== Biography ==
She is a member of SKLA Sopot. She won bronze medals in the 4 x 400 metres relays at the 2019 European Athletics U20 Championships and the 2021 European Athletics U23 Championships.

She won gold in the 4 x 400 metres relay at the 2021 Summer World University Games held in China in 2023, where she also reached the final of the individual 400 metres.

She placed seventh in the mixed 4x400 metres relay with the Polish team at the 2024 European Athletics Championships in Rome. She competed in the women's 4 x 400 metres relay at the 2024 Paris Olympics.

She made her debut over 800 metres in Olsztyn in the autumn of 2024, running a time of 2:04.89. She finished third at the Polish Indoor Championships over 800 metres finishing behind only the experienced pair of Anna Wielgosz and Angelika Sarna, running 2:01.53. She was selected for the 800 metres at the 2025 European Athletics Indoor Championships. She was selected for the 4x400m relay team for the 2025 World Athletics Indoor Championships in Nanjing in March 2025. She competed at the 2025 World Athletics Relays in China in the Women's 4 × 400 metres relay in May 2025.

She was a gold medalist in the mixed 4 × 400 m relay at the 2025 Summer World University Games in Germany. She was selected for the Polish team for the 2025 World Athletics Championships in Tokyo, Japan, where she ran as part of the women's 4 x 400 metres team which qualified for the final.

In August, she competed at the 2026 European Athletics Championships in Birmingham, England, in the women's 800 metres.
