= 2023 French Indoor Athletics Championships =

- Edition: 51st
- Dates: 18–19 February
- Host city: Aubière
- Venue: Stadium Jean-Pellez
- Events: 26

The 2023 French Indoor Athletics Championships was the 52nd edition of the national championship in indoor track and field for France, organised by the French Athletics Federation. It was held on 18–19 February at the Stadium Jean-Pellez in Aubière. A total of 26 events (divided evenly between the sexes) were contested over the two-day competition.

== Programme ==
Finals	18 February	19 February
Men	60 m, 3000 m, long jump, shot put	200 m, 400 m, 800 m, 1500 m, 60 m hurdles, high jump, pole vault, triple jump, heptathlon
Women	60 m, 3000 m, 60 m hurdles, high jump, pole vault, triple jump, shot put, pentathlon	200 m, 400 m, 800 m, 1500 m, long jump

== Results ==
=== Men ===
Event	Gold		Silver		Bronze	
60 metres	Jeff Erius	6.62 PB NJR	Méba-Mickaël Zeze	6.63 PB	William Aguessy	6.64 PB
200 metres	Hachim Maaroufou	21.02 PB	Harold Achi-Yao	21.04 PB	Paul Tritenne	21.04 PB
400 metres	Gilles Biron	46.11 PB	Muhammad Abdallah Kounta	46.28 PB	Téo Andant	46.63 PB
800 metres	Benjamin Robert	1:47.84	Clément Dhainaut	1:48.36	Corentin Le Clezio	1:49.42
1500 metres	Azeddine Habz	3:40.93	Louis Gilavert	3:41.37	Benoit Campion	3:41.66
3000 metres	Bastien Augusto	7:57.56	Simon Denissel	7:58.22	Romain Mornet	7:58.89
60 m hurdles	Just Kwaou-Mathey	7.53 PB	Pascal Martinot-Lagarde	7.58	Dimitri Bascou	7.58
High jump	Matthieu Tomassi	2.15 m	Raphaël Moudoulou	2.15 m PB	Kristen Biyengui	2.12 m
Pole vault	Alioune Sene	5.60 m	Valentin Lavillenie	5.60 m	Thibaut Collet	5.50 m
Long jump	Jean-Pierre Bertrand	7.83 m	Jules Pommery	7.74 m	Romain Didelot	7.72 m
Triple jump	Benjamin Compaoré	16.95 m	Kevin Drila	15.93 m	Enzo Hodebar	15.87 m
Shot put	Stephen Mailagi	19.07 m PB	Yann Moisan	18.28 m	Alexandre Henrat	17.12 m
Heptathlon	Makenson Gletty	6090 pts PB	Téo Bastien	5744 pts PB	Bastien Auzeil	5723 pts

=== Women ===
Event	Gold		Silver		Bronze	
60 metres	Cynthia Leduc	7.25	Mallory Leconte	7.33	Ange Hilary Gode	7.34 PB
200 metres	Maroussia Paré	23.49	Orane Doumbé	23.62 PB	Marie-Ange Rimlinger	23.92
400 metres	Camille Séri	52.48 PB	Louise Maraval	52.85 PB	Marjorie Veyssiere	53.01 PB
800 metres	Charlotte Pizzo	2:05.59	Léna Kandissounon	2:05.82	Agathe Guillemot	2:05.97
1500 metres	Bérénice Cleyet-Merle	4:15.41	Sarah Madeleine	4:15.78	Anaïs Bourgoin	4:17.32 PB
3000 metres	Alice Finot	9:05.08	Aude Clavier	9:13.51	Leila Hadji	9:14.29
60 m hurdles	Laëticia Bapté	7.95	Cyréna Samba-Mayela	7.98	Judy Chalcou	7.99 PB
High jump	Solène Gicquel	1.92 m PB	Nawal Meniker	1.92 m PB	Juliette Perez	1.83 m
Pole vault	Margot Chevrier	4.61 m	Ninon Chapelle	4.40 m	Alix Dehaynain	4.40 m
Long jump	Tiphaine Mauchant	6.56 m	Éloyse Lesueur-Aymonin	6.41 m	Rougui Sow	6.40 m
Triple jump	Ilionis Guillaume	13.48 m	Clémence Rougier	13.24 m	Aminata Ndiaye	13.00 m
Shot put	Amanda Ngandu-Ntumba	16.10 m	Christine Gavarin	15.73 m PB	Naomie Wuta	15.40 m PB
Pentathlon	Léonie Cambours	4603 pts PB	Célia Perron	4341 pts	Annaelle Nyabeu Djapa	4326 pts
