= Andrea Nygård Vie =

Norwegian runner (born 2006)

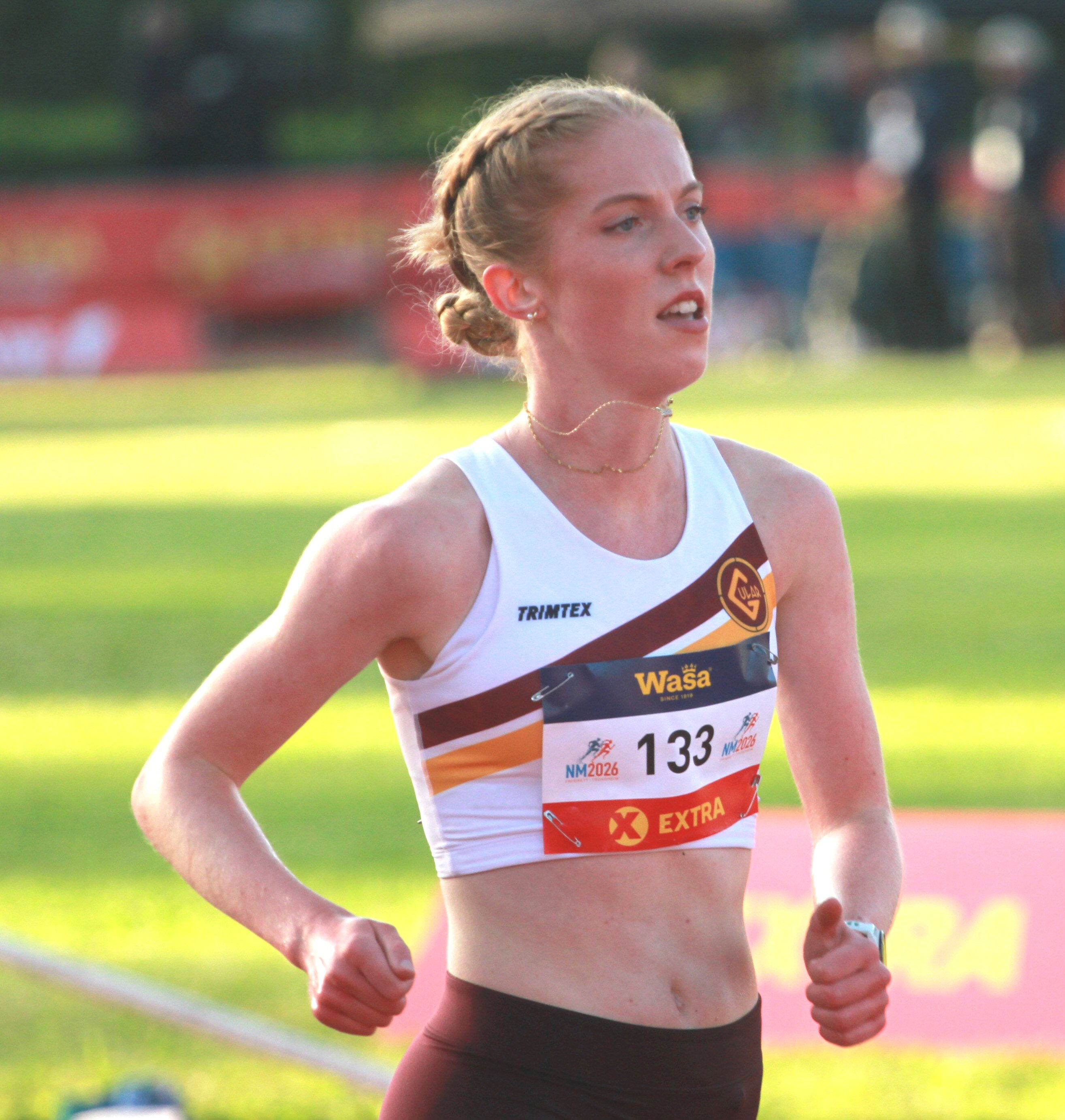

Personal information
- Born: 4 July 2006 (age 20)

Sport
- Sport: Athletics
- Events: Steeplechase, Cross country running
Medal record
Women's athletics
Representing Norway
European U20 Championships
Gold medal – first place	2025 Tampere	3000 m s'chase
European Youth Olympic Festival
Silver medal – second place	2023 Maribor	2000m s'chase

Andrea Nygård Vie (born 4 July 2006) is a Norwegian steeplechase and cross country runner. She won the gold medal in the 3000m steeplechase at the 2025 European Athletics U20 Championships.

== Biography ==
From Fløksand in Vestland, Vie placed fifth in the 2000m steeplechase at the 2022 European Athletics U18 Championships and trained as a member of Aks 77 athletics club.

Vie later became a member of IL Norna-Salhus. She placed second in the 2000 metres steeplechase at the 2023 European Youth Summer Olympic Festival in Maribor, Slovenia. She was selected to compete for Norway at the 2024 World Athletics U20 Championships in Lima, Peru.

Vie placed second over 3000 metres at the 2025 Norwegian Indoor Athletics Championships in February 2025. Vie ran a personal best for the 3000 metres steeplechase at the 9:51.72 in Gothenburg on 26 July 2025. She won the 3000m steeplechase at the 2025 European Athletics U20 Championships in Tampere, Finland in August 2025 in 9:57.19.

Vie won the women's U20 race at the Nordic Cross Country Championships in Kastrup, Denmark, on 9 November 2025, leading a Norwegian 1-2 with Venus Abraham Teffera, with Norway also winning the team title.

In August 2026, she competed at the 2026 European Athletics Championships in Birmingham, England, in the 3000 metres steeplechase.

== Personal life ==
Vie was diagnosed with type 1 diabetes in May 2025.
