= Marta Serrano =

Spanish athlete

Marta Serrano Azpiazu
Personal information
- Born: 5 April 2003 (age 23)

Sport
- Sport: Athletics
- Events: 3000m, 5000m, 3000m steeplechase

Achievements and titles
- Personal bests: 3000m: 8:53.97 (Valencia, 2025); 5000m: 15:27.06 (Nerja, 2023); 3000m Steeplechase: 9:21.00 (Tokyo, 2025)
Medal record
Women's athletics
Representing Spain
European U23 Championships
Silver medal – second place	2025 Bergen	3000m steeplechase
Bronze medal – third place	2023 Espoo	3000 m steeplechase
European Cross Country Championships
Bronze medal – third place	2025 Lagoa	U23 team
Bronze medal – third place	2023 Brussels	U23 team

Marta Serrano Azpiazu (born 5 April 2003) is a Spanish track and field athlete who competes as a long-distance runner and a steeplechaser.

== Biography ==
Serrano is a member of Valencia Athletics Club, having joined the club in 2017. She initially competed in combined events before focusing on steeplechase in 2021. She broke the Spanish U20 record for the 3000m steeplechase in 2022 at the L'Hospitalet de Llobregat, running 9:59.97. In May 2023, Serrano set a new national U23 record for the 5000m when she clocked 15:27.06 in Málaga. Two weeks later, she lowered her personal best for the 3000m steeplechase, and broke the Spanish U23 record when she ran 9:27.07 in Budapest.

Serrano won a bronze medal in the 3000m steeplechase at the European Athletics U23 Championships in Espoo in July 2023. She became the national champion by winning the Spanish Athletics Championships in July 2023, and in doing so lowered the national U23 record again, recording a time of 9:26.35. At the age of 20 years-old, she also became the youngest ever winner of the title.

Competing in the 3000m steeplechase at the 2023 World Athletics Championships in Budapest, she finished ninth in her heat, running 9:31.82.

She competed in the U23 race at the 2024 European Cross Country Championships, helping Spain to finish fourth overall in the team race. She ran an indoors personal best over 3000 meters, running 8:53.97 in Valencia in February 2025.

In May 2025, she ran a new personal best for the 3000 metres steeplechase of 9:25.74 at the World Athletics Continental Tour Gold meeting in Bydgoszcz. She competed for Spain at the 2025 European Athletics Team Championships First Division in Madrid on 29 June 2025, finishing in fourth place. She finished 0.25 seconds behind Ilona Mononen to win the silver medal in the 3000 metres steeplechase at the 2025 European Athletics U23 Championships in Bergen, Norway. She won the 3000 metres steeplechase at the Spanish Athletics Championships in August 2025.

She was selected for the Spanish team for the 2025 World Athletics Championships in Tokyo, Japan where she ran a personal best 9:21.00 but did not qualify for the final of the 3000 metres steeplechase. She had a top-ten finish at the Cross Internacional de Itálica in Spain, in November 2025, a World Athletics Cross Country Tour Gold race. Competing in the under-23 category at the 2025 European Cross Country Championships in Portugal, Serrano won the bronze medal with Spain in the team event, placing sixth individually. Serrano won the bronze medal in the short course race at the World University Cross Country Championships in March 2026, also winning the silver medal in the team competition alongside María Forero. In August, she competed at the 2026 European Athletics Championships in Birmingham, England, in the 3000 metres steeplechase, placing twelfth overall.

== Personal life ==
She was born in Madrid. She is the daughter of Spanish international runners Natalia Azpiazu and Antonio Serrano, who represented Spain at the 1988 and 1992 Olympic Games.
