= Adia Budde =

German athlete (born 2005)

Personal information
- Born: 29 July 2005 (age 20)

Sport
- Sport: Athletics
- Event(s): Middle-distance running, Steeplechase

Achievements and titles
- Personal best(s): 800m: 2:05.07 (Tübingen, 2025); 1500m: 4:15.42 (Dortmund, 2026); 3000m: 9:22.11 (Rostock, 2023); 5000m: 16:14.32 (Wassenburg, 2024); 3000m s'chase: 9:32.14 (Bergen, 2025)
Medal record
Women's athletics
Representing Germany
European Athletics U23 Championships
| Bronze medal – third place | 2025 Bergen | 3000 m s'chase |
World University Games
| Bronze medal – third place | 2025 Rhine-Ruhr | 3000 m steeplechase |
European U20 Championships
| Silver medal – second place | 2023 Jerusalem | 3000 m S'chase |
European U18 Championships
| Silver medal – second place | 2022 Jerusalem | 2000 m S'chase |

Adia Budde (born 29 July 2005) is a German middle-distance runner and steeplechaser. She won the 3000 metres steeplechase at the 2025 German Athletics Championships.

== Career ==
From Schleswig-Holstein, she began in athletics at seven years-old at TSV Altenholz near Kiel. She trained as a young athlete under the guidance of coach Karsten Ralfs. initially a multi-event athlete, she led the German under-15 standings in pentathlon in 2020. The following year, she won a medal in the 2000 metres steeplechase in the U18 age group at the German Youth Championships

In July 2022, she won the silver medal behind compatriot Jolanda Kallabis in the 2000 metres steeplechase at the 2022 European Athletics U18 Championships, in Jerusalem, Israel running 6:28.09 to finish ahead of Denmark's Sofia Thøgersen, with all three inside the previous championship record. In August 2023, she won the silver medal in Jerusalem at the 2023 European Athletics U20 Championships, running 10:07.34 for the 3000 metres steeplechase.

Budde became the 2024 German U20 5000 metres champion. She placed sixth in the final of the 3000 metres steeplechase at the 2024 World Athletics U20 Championships in Lima, Peru, running a personal best time of 9:49.11. At the end of that year, she moved from Schleswig-Holstein to Tübingen with LAV Stadtwerke Tübingen.

The following spring in Brussels, she lowered her personal best for the 3000 metres steeplechase by more than 16 seconds to 9:32.47 minutes. This moved her on the German all-time list into the top six. Budde lowered her personal best again to 9:32.14 as she won the bronze medal in the 3000 metres steeplechase at the 2025 European Athletics U23 Championships in Bergen, Norway, behind Ilona Mononen of Finland and Spaniard Marta Serrano. She also won the bronze medal behind Mononen at the 2025 World Summer University Games in Bochum, over 3000 metres. Budde won the 3000 metres steeplechase at the 2025 German Athletics Championships in Dresden in 9:45.48.

Competing indoors over 1500 metres she was runner-up to defending champion Majtie Kolberg at the 2026 German Indoor Athletics Championships in Dortmund. Competing for Germany in the Short Mixed Relay at the World University Cross Country Championships in March 2026, Budde won the bronze medal.
