= Ankita Dhyani =

Indian athlete

Personal information
- Nationality: Indian
- Born: 5 February 2002 (age 24) Maroda, Pauri Garhwal district, Uttarakhand, India

Sport
- Sport: Track and field
- Events: 2000 m SC, 3000 m SC, 3000 m, 5000 m

Achievements and titles
- Personal bests: 2000mSC: 6:13.92 NR (2025)
Medal record
Women's athletics
Representing India
Asian Championships
Bronze medal – third place	2023 Bangkok	5000 m
Asian Indoor Championships
Silver medal – second place	2024 Tehran	3000 m
World University Games
Silver medal – second place	2025 Rhine-Ruhr	3000 m steeplechase

Ankita Dhyani (born 5 February 2002) is an Indian middle-distance and long-distance runner. She has represented India at major international competitions, including the 2022 Asian Games and the 2024 Paris Olympics. She is the current national record holder in the women's 2000 m steeplechase event, clocking 6:13.92 in August 2025.

== Early life ==
Dhyani hails from Maroda village in the Pauri Garhwal district, Uttarakhand. She used to run with the big boys training for Army selections in her village which is at a high altitude of 1400 m.

== Career ==
=== International ===
On 14 August 2025, Dhyani came first in the grand slam Jerusalem tournament, a World Athletics continental tour silver category B track and field athletics event, clocking 6 minutes, 13.92 seconds beating the 6:14.38 time held by Parul Chaudhary in the women's 2000 metre steeplechase event. She defeated Israel's Adva Cohen (6:15.20) and Denmark's Juliane Hvid (6:17.80) who took second and third places, respectively.

In July 2025, she won a silver clocking her personal best time of 9:31.99 in the women's 3000m steeplechase event at the FISU World University Games in Germany.

She qualified for the 2024 Olympic Games at Paris in 5000m event and got a last minute entry in the 3000m steeplechase events through world ranking quota. She clocked her season's best time of 15:10.58 in the 5000m to finish 20th in her heat and an overall 40th. On 4 August 2024, she finished 8th in her heat in the 3000m steeplechase, also her season's best, with a time of 9:33.39. She did not advance further in both the events at the Summer Olympics.

In Asian Athletics Championships 2025 held in Gumi, Republic of South Korea, she finished fifth in the women's 3000m steeplechase while compatriot Parul won silver.

In May 2023, she won a bronze medal in the Asian Athletics championships in Bangkok, Thailand after her victory in the 3000 m steeplechase event in March at Mangrum Invitational meet. In August 2021, she took part in 1500 m and 5000 m at the World Under-20 championships at Nairobi, Kenya.

=== Domestic ===
In January 2021, she won gold in both 1500 m and 5000 m at the Federation Cup Junior u-20 Athletics Championships at Sangrur, Punjab. In 2021, she also won gold in both 1500 m and 5000 m at the Junior National Championships in Guwahati. In 5000 m she clocked 16:21.19, to set a Junior National record erasing the 16:21.59 mark set by Sunita Rani 23 back.

In 2018, she won the gold in the 200 m at the Youth Nationals in Vijayawada, Andhra Pradesh. In 2019, she won the 1500 m in the Junior Nationals at Ranchi. She won gold in 1500 m and 5000 m at the Khelo India Youth games at Pune, also in 2019.

In 2020, she won gold in 1500 m and 5000 m at the Khelo India Youth games at Guwahati.
