= 2023 European Athletics U23 Championships – Women's high jump =

Women's high jump at the 2023 European Athletics U23 Championships
- Venue: Leppävaara Stadium
- Location: Espoo, Finland
- Dates: 14 July (qualification); 16 July (final)
- Competitors: 19 from 16 nations
- Winning height: 1.91 m

Medalists
| gold medal | Elena Kulichenko | Cyprus |
| silver medal | Panagiota Dosi | Greece |
| bronze medal | Wiktoria Miąso | Poland |

The women's high jump event at the 2023 European Athletics U23 Championships was held in Espoo, Finland, at Leppävaara Stadium on 14 and 16 July.

== Records ==
Prior to the competition, the records were as follows:

| European U23 record | Stefka Kostadinova (BUL) | 2.09 m | Rome, Italy | 30 August 1987 |
| Championship U23 record | Yaroslava Mahuchikh (UKR) | 2.00 m | Tallinn, Estonia | 10 July 2021 |

== Results ==
=== Qualification ===
Qualification rules: All athletes over 1.87 m (Q) or at least 12 best (q) will advance to the final.

| Rank | Group | Name | Nationality | 1.68 | 1.73 | 1.77 | 1.81 | 1.84 | 1.87 | Mark | Notes |
|---|---|---|---|---|---|---|---|---|---|---|---|
| 1 | A | Elena Kulichenko | Cyprus | – | – | o | o | | | 1.81 | q |
| 1 | A | Idea Pieroni | Italy | – | o | o | o | | | 1.81 | q |
| 1 | B | Venla Pulkkanen | Finland | – | o | o | o | | | 1.81 | q |
| 1 | A | Denisa Pešová | Czech Republic | o | o | o | o | | | 1.81 | q |
| 1 | B | Asia Tavernini | Italy | – | o | o | o | | | 1.81 | q |
| 1 | B | Blessing Enatoh | Germany | o | o | o | o | | | 1.81 | q |
| 1 | A | Yorunn Ligneel | Belgium | o | o | o | o | | | 1.81 | q |
| 8 | B | Wiktoria Miąso | Poland | – | o | xo | o | | | 1.81 | q |
| 9 | A | Una Stancev | Spain | o | xxo | o | o | | | 1.81 | q |
| 10 | B | Kathrine Fjerbæk Olsen | Denmark | xo | xxo | xxo | o | | | 1.81 | q, PB |
| 11 | B | Panagiota Dosi | Greece | – | – | o | xo | | | 1.81 | q |
| 11 | A | Laureen Maxwell | France | – | o | o | xo | | | 1.81 | q |
| 13 | B | Federica Gabriela Apostol | Romania | o | o | xo | xo | | | 1.81 | q |
| 14 | A | Lilian Turban | Estonia | – | o | o | xxx | | | 1.77 | |
| 14 | B | Nina Borger | Netherlands | o | o | o | xxx | | | 1.77 | |
| 16 | B | Marithe-Thérèse Engondo | Switzerland | o | o | xo | xxx | | | 1.77 | |
| 16 | B | Veronika Kramarenko | Ukraine | o | o | xo | xxx | | | 1.77 | |
| 18 | A | Johanna Nieminen | Finland | xo | o | xo | xxx | | | 1.77 | |
| 19 | A | Santi-Danai Papakosta | Greece | xo | xxo | xxx | | | | 1.73 | |

=== Final ===
| Rank | Name | Nationality | 1.76 | 1.80 | 1.84 | 1.87 | 1.89 | 1.91 | 1.94 | Mark | Notes |
|---|---|---|---|---|---|---|---|---|---|---|---|
| 1st place, gold medalist(s) | Elena Kulichenko | Cyprus | o | o | o | o | o | xo | xxx | 1.91 | |
| 2nd place, silver medalist(s) | Panagiota Dosi | Greece | o | o | o | o | xxo | xxxx | | 1.89 | PB |
| 3rd place, bronze medalist(s) | Wiktoria Miąso | Poland | o | o | xxo | o | xxx | | | 1.87 | SB |
| 4 | Venla Pulkkanen | Finland | o | o | o | xxo | xxx | | | 1.87 | =PB |
| 4 | Denisa Pešová | Czech Republic | o | o | o | xxo | xxx | | | 1.87 | PB |
| 6 | Idea Pieroni | Italy | o | o | xo | xxo | xxx | | | 1.87 | SB |
| 7 | Asia Tavernini | Italy | o | o | o | xxx | | | | 1.84 | |
| 7 | Yorunn Ligneel | Belgium | o | o | o | xxx | | | | 1.84 | |
| 9 | Laureen Maxwell | France | o | xxo | o | xxx | | | | 1.84 | |
| 10 | Blessing Enatoh | Germany | o | o | xo | xxx | | | | 1.84 | |
| 11 | Una Stancev | Spain | o | xo | xxx | | | | | 1.80 | |
| 12 | Federica Gabriela Apostol | Romania | o | xxx | | | | | | 1.75 | |
| | Kathrine Fjerbæk Olsen | Denmark | xxx | | | | | | | NM | |
