= Olivia Gürth =

German athlete (born 2002)

- At the 2026 Weltklasse Zürich

Personal information
- Nationality: German
- Born: 31 May 2002 (age 24)

Sport
- Sport: Athletics
- Event: 3000 m steeplechase

Achievements and titles
- Personal bests: 800 m: 2:03.70 (Pfungstadt, 2023); 1500 m: 4:14.86 (Rehlingen, 2023); 3000 m: 9:12.76 (Regensburg, 2023); 3000 m Steeplechase: 9:15.17 (Rome, 2024)
Medal record
Women's athletics
Representing Germany
European Championships
Bronze medal – third place	2026 Birmingham	3000 m steeplechase
European U23 Championships
Gold medal – first place	2023 Espoo	3000 m steeplechase
European Athletics U20 Championships
Gold medal – first place	2021 Tallinn	3000 m steeplechase

Olivia Gürth (born 31 May 2002) is a German track and field athlete. In 2023, she became the European U23 champion in the 3000 m steeplechase. She competed at the 2024 Olympic Games.

== Biography ==
Gürth runs for Diezer TSK Oranien in Diez, Germany. She won gold at the 2021 European Athletics U20 Championships in Tallinn, in the 3000 m steeplechase. In the autumn of 2022, she began training in Frankfurt under Wolfgang Heinig, alongside the likes of Gesa Krause and Maruša Mišmaš.

=== 2023 ===
Gürth won the gold medal at the 2023 European Athletics U23 Championships in Espoo in July 2023, recording a championship record time of 9:26.98 in the Women's 3000 metres steeplechase. She is only the fifth German woman in history to run under 9:30.00 for the event.

Competing in the 3000 m steeplechase at the 2023 World Athletics Championships in Budapest, she qualified for the final, running a 9:24.28 personal best in her heat. In the final she ran another personal best, finishing fourteenth in 9:20.08. She made her Diamond League debut in August 2023, in Zürich.

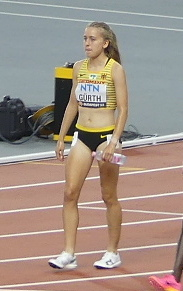
Gürth at the 2023 World Championships

=== 2024 ===
In May 2024, she was selected for the 2024 European Athletics Championships in Rome, Italy, where she qualified for the final and placed eleventh overall in a time of 9:31.98. She competed at the 2024 Summer Olympics in the Women's 3000 metres steeplechase, running a personal best time of 9:16.47. She broke that personal best again at the end of that month in Rome, at the 2024 Golden Gala, running a time of 9:15.17. She then set a personal best of 6:00.50 for the 2000 m steeplechase in finishing runner-up at the ISTAF Berlin meeting on 1 September 2024.

=== 2025 ===
She competed, finishing eleventh overall, in the 3000 metres steeplechase in May 2025 at the 2025 Doha Diamond League. In August, she placed third in the mile steeplechase at the 2025 Memorial Van Damme behind Winfred Yavi and Angelina Ellis, with a time of 4:51.87. She was selected for the German team for the 2025 World Athletics Championships in Tokyo, Japan, where she ran a season's best 9:15.28 but did not qualify for the final of the 3000 metres steeplechase.

=== 2026 ===
In August 2026, she won the bronze medal at the 2026 European Athletics Championships in Birmingham, England in the 3000 metres steeplechase finishing in 9:15.33 behind compatriot Gesa Krause and defending champion Alice Finot.
