= Panagiota Dosi =

Greek athlete

Personal information
- Nationality: Greek
- Born: 1 April 2001 (age 25)

Sport
- Sport: Athletics
- Event: High Jump

Achievements and titles
- Personal bests: High jump: 1.91m (Kraljevo, 2023)
Medal record
European U23 Championships
Silver medal – second place	2023 Espoo	High jump

Panagiota Dosi (Παναγιώτα Δόση, born 1 April 2001) is a Greek track and field athlete who competes in the high jump. In 2023, she became a two-time Greek national champion. She competed at the 2024 Olympic Games.

== Early and personal life ==
Born in Athens, Dosi was brought up on the island of Corfu after her family moved there when she was three months old. She took up track and field athletics at the age of 13 yesrs-old. She is coached by her father, who is a former high jump competitor himself.

== Career ==
In 2017, in Kifissia, Athens she jumped a personal best 1.83 metres. In August 2020, Dosi won the National title at the Greek Athletics Championships in the high jump for the first time. In February 2021, Dosi came second in the Greek Indoor Athletics Championships.

Dosi won silver behind Elena Kulichenko at the U23 European Athletics Championships in Espoo in July 2023 with a new personal best clearance of 1.89m. Shortly after, competing at the Balkan Athletics Championships, Dosi cleared a new personal best height of 1.91m in Kraljevo.

She was selected as part of the Greek squad for the 2023 World Athletics Championships in Budapest in August 2023, where she cleared 1.80 metres but did not proceed to the final.

In February 2024, she cleared 1.86 metres to finish third on countback behind Daniela Stanciu and event winner Mirela Demireva at the 2024 Balkan Indoor Athletics Championships. At the 2024 European Athletics Championships in Rome, she jumpwed 1.81 metres and did not reach the final. She competed in the high jump at the 2024 Paris Olympics, but she failed to record a successful jump and did not proceed to the final.

In August 2026, she competed at the 2026 European Athletics Championships in Birmingham, England.

== International competitions ==
Year	Competition	Venue	Position	Notes
Representing Greece
2023	European U23 Championships	Espoo, Finland	2nd	1.89 m PB
2023	World Championships	Budapest, Hungary	34th (q)	1.80 m
2024	European Championships	Rome, Italy	28th (q)	1.81 m
2024	Olympic Games	Paris, France	— (q)	NM
2026	European Championships	Birmingham, United Kingdom	24th (q)	1.84 m
2026	Mediterranean Games	Taranto, Italy	6th	1.87 m
