= 2021 European Athletics U23 Championships – Women's 4 × 400 metres relay =

Event at 2021 European Athletics

Women's 4 × 400 metres relay at the 2021 European Athletics U23 Championships
- Venue: Kadriorg Stadium, Tallinn
- Dates: 11 July
- Competitors: 68 from 15 nations
- Winning time: 3:30.11

Medalists
| gold medal | Lada Vondrová; Nikoleta Jíchová; Barbora Veselá; Barbora Malíková; Věra Holubářová* | Czech Republic |
| silver medal | Sokhna Lacoste; Louise Maraval; Camille Seri; Shana Grebo; Agathe Guillemot* | France |
| bronze medal | Natalia Wosztyl; Aleksandra Formella; Karolina Łozowska; Kinga Gacka; Aleksandra Wsołek*; Anna Gryc* | Poland |

The women's 4 × 400 metres relay event at the 2021 European Athletics U23 Championships was held in Tallinn, Estonia, at Kadriorg Stadium on 11 July.

== Records ==
Prior to the competition, the records were as follows:

| European U23 record | Russia (RUS) | 3:26.58 | Debrecen, Hungary | 15 July 2007 |
| Championship U23 record | Russia (RUS) | 3:26.58 | Debrecen, Hungary | 15 July 2007 |

== Results ==
=== Round 1 ===
Qualification rule: First 3 in each heat (Q) and the next 2 fastest (q) advance to the Final.

| Rank | Heat | Nation | Athletes | Time | Notes |
|---|---|---|---|---|---|
| 1 | 2 | Poland | Aleksandra Wsołek, Aleksandra Formella, Anna Gryc, Karolina Łozowska | 3:34.07 | Q, EU23L |
| 2 | 2 | France | Agathe Guillemot, Louise Maraval, Camille Seri, Shana Grebo | 3:34.41 | Q |
| 3 | 2 | Spain | Ángela García, Andrea Jiménez, Carla García, Sara Gallego | 3:34.64 | Q, NU23R |
| 4 | 1 | Germany | Brenda Cataria-Byll, Lisa Sophie Hartmann, Luna Thiel, Mona Mayer | 3:34.77 | Q |
| 5 | 1 | Italy | Alessandra Bonora, Anna Polinari, Eleonora Ricci, Samantha Zago | 3:34.97 | Q |
| 6 | 2 | Great Britain | Hannah Kelly, Jade O'Dowda, Yasmin Liverpool, Zoe Pollock | 3:34.99 | q |
| 7 | 1 | Czech Republic | Nikoleta Jíchová, Věra Holubářová, Barbora Veselá, Lada Vondrová | 3:35.35 | Q |
| 8 | 1 | Switzerland | Lena Wernli, Veronica Vancardo, Giulia Senn, Silke Lemmens | 3:35.76 | q, NU23R |
| 9 | 1 | Ukraine | Olena Radiuk-Kucuk, Tetyana Bezshyyko, Mariya Buryak, Maryana Shostak | 3:37.00 | |
| 10 | 2 | Belgium | Eline Claeys, Fiebe Tengrootenhuysen, Nina Hespel, Helena Ponette | 3:37.47 | |
| 11 | 2 | Belarus | Katsiaryna Zhyvayeva, Valiantsina Chymbar, Palina Kiberava, Asteria Uzo Limai | 3:37.65 | |
| 12 | 1 | Finland | Frida Hämäläinen, Nea Mattila, Mette Baas, Viola Westling | 3:38.83 | |
| 13 | 1 | Hungary | Hanna Répássy, Sára Mátó, Tamara Erdei, Janka Molnár | 3:40.38 | |
| 14 | 2 | Slovakia | Viktoria Strýčková, Gabriela Gajanová, Lenka Predajnianska, Natália Bučičová | 3:45.02 | NU23R |
| 15 | 2 | Norway | Ingrid Pernille Rismark, Solveig Vråle, Hanne Arstein, Josefine Tomine Eriksen | 3:47.93 | |

=== Final ===
| Rank | Nation | Athletes | Time | Notes |
|---|---|---|---|---|
| 1st place, gold medalist(s) | Czech Republic | Lada Vondrová, Nikoleta Jíchová, Barbora Veselá, Barbora Malíková | 3:30.11 | EU23L |
| 2nd place, silver medalist(s) | France | Sokhna Lacoste, Louise Maraval, Camille Seri, Shana Grebo | 3:30.33 | NU23R |
| 3rd place, bronze medalist(s) | Poland | Natalia Wosztyl, Aleksandra Formella, Karolina Łozowska, Kinga Gacka | 3:30.38 | |
| 4 | Germany | Brenda Cataria-Byll, Lisa Sophie Hartmann, Luna Thiel, Mona Mayer | 3:30.72 | |
| 5 | Great Britain | Hannah Kelly, Zoe Pollock, Holly Mills, Isabelle Boffey | 3:33.06 | |
| 6 | Italy | Alessandra Bonora, Eloisa Coiro, Anna Polinari, Samantha Zago | 3:33.52 | |
| 7 | Spain | Ángela García, Andrea Jiménez, Carla García, Sara Gallego | 3:33.54 | NU23R |
| 8 | Switzerland | Silke Lemmens, Veronica Vancardo, Giulia Senn, Yasmin Giger | 3:34.14 | NU23R |
