= Sarah Tait (runner) =

British athlete (born 2001)

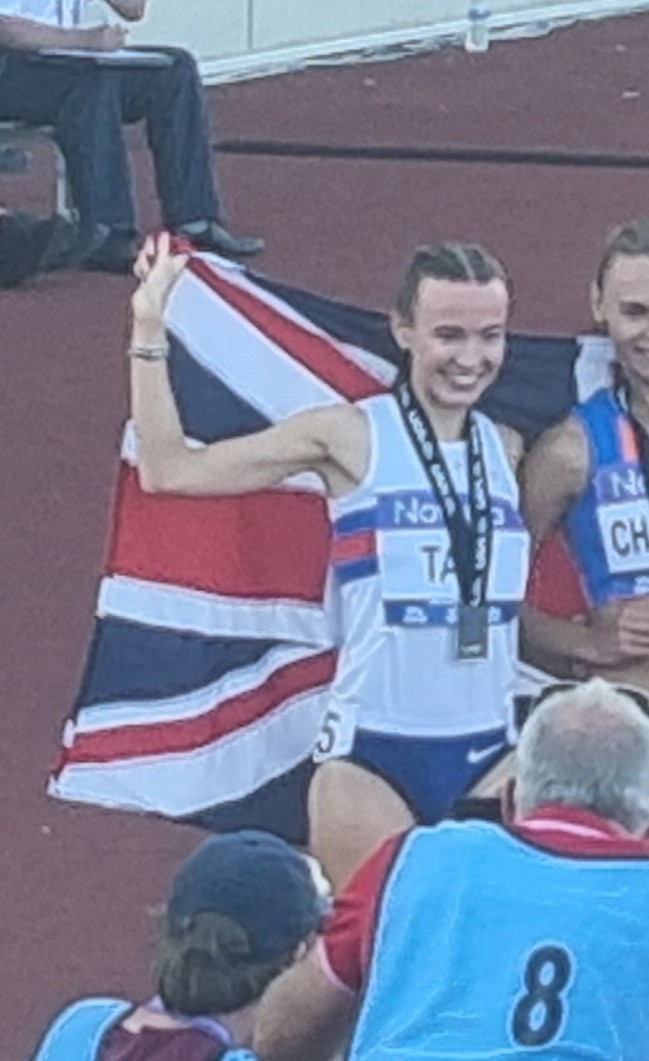
- Sarah Tait at the 2025 UK Athletics Championships

Personal information
- Nationality: British (Scottish)
- Born: 26 March 2001 (age 25)

Sport
- Sport: Athletics
- Event: Steeplechase
- Club: Lasswade/West Virginia Uni

Achievements and titles
- Personal bests: 3000m: 8:59.73 (Boston, 2025); 3000m s'chase: 9:18.66 (Oordegem, 2025) NRS

Sarah Tait (born 26 March 2001) is a Scottish steeplechase runner. In 2025, she broke Eilish McColgan's Scottish record for the 3000 metres steeplechase and represented Great Britain at the 2025 World Championships.

== Early life ==
Tait is from Fairmilehead. She graduated with a BA (Hons) degree in Sports Studies in 2023 from the University of Stirling before later studying at the University of West Virginia.

== Career ==
Tait is a member of Lasswade Athletics Club where she is coached by Linda and Kirk Smith.

In June 2021, she broke her personal best three times for the 3000 metres steeplechase and had a victory at the England Athletics Under-23 Championships. She was subsequently selected for the 2021 European Athletics U23 Championships in Tallinn, Estonia, placing fifth in the final of the 3000 metres steeplechase.

Tait won the British Universities and Colleges Sport (BUCS) title in 2023. That year, she also won the Scottish Student Sport (SSS) title, as she also had in 2020 and 2022. She finished sixth in the final of the 3000 metres steeplechase at the 2023 European Athletics U23 Championships in Espoo, Finland. She had a fourth-place at the 2024 British Athletics Championships in the 3000m steeplechase, with a personal best time of 9:49.88.

Competing in the United States, she set a 3000 metres indoors personal best in Boston, Massachusetts in February 2025, running 8:59.73 to move to eleventh on the Scottish all-time list. She set a new personal best of 9:37.62 for the 3000m steeplechase in 2025 at the Bryan Clay Invitational and later qualified for the 2025 NCAA Championships. She lowered her personal best to 9:37.06 in qualifying for the final of the 2025 NCAA Outdoor Championships. In the final, she ran a new personal best of 9:27.80 to place fourth overall. The time also broke the Eilish McColgan Scottish record set 12 years previously.

Tait was selected for the British team to compete at the 2025 European Athletics Team Championships in Madrid in June 2025 for her senior international debut, finishing second in the 3000 metres steeplechase, 0.03 seconds behind Finland's Ilona Mononen. On 2 August, she set a new Scottish record to finish second behind Elise Thorner at the 2025 UK Athletics Championships in Birmingham in 9:25.17. Later that month, she lowered her personal best for the 3000m steeplechase to 9:18.66 whilst running in Oordegem, Belgium. She competed as part of the British team for the 2025 World Athletics Championships in Tokyo, Japan. However, a difficult landing from a water jump at the championships caused ruptured and torn ankle ligaments with bone bruising. In 2026, Tait joined On Athletics Club Oceania under Head Coach Craig Mottram. In June, she placed third in the 3000 metres steeplechase at the 2026 UK Championships, her first steeplechase race of the year.

Tait placed tenth competing for Scotland in the 3000 m steeplechase at the 2026 Commonwealth Games in Glasgow. In August, she competed at the 2026 European Athletics Championships in Birmingham, England, in the 3000 metres steeplechase.

== Personal life ==
She has been a beneficiary of the Give Back to the Track initiative founded by Eilish McColgan.
