= Teuraiterai Tupaia =

French Polynesian athlete (born 2000)

Teura’itera’i Tupaia
Personal information
- Nickname: Teura Tupaia
- Born: 6 February 2000 (age 26) Papeete, French Polynesia
- Height: 1.93 m (6 ft 4 in)
- Weight: 98 kg (216 lb)

Sport
- Country: French Polynesia
- Sport: Athletics
- Event: Javelin throw
Medal record
Men's athletics
Representing France
European Throwing Cup
Gold medal – first place	2022 Leiria	U23 Javelin
Gold medal – first place	2021 Split	U23 Javelin
French Athletics Championships
Gold medal – first place	2021 Angers	Javelin
Silver medal – second place	2020 Albi	Javelin

Teura’itera’i Tupaia (born 6 February 2000) is a French Polynesian athlete specialising in the Javelin throw.

== Biography ==
Tupaia was born in Papeete in French Polynesia, and began athletics at the age of 11. He participated in the athletics section of A.S. Aorai in French Polynesia until 2019. In 2020 he moved to France where he competed with the Entente de Haute-Alsace.

In 2020, he won silver at the 2020 French Athletics Championships in Albi with a throw of 73.07 m (personal record).

He won gold in the under-23 category at the 2021 European Throwing Cup in Split with a throw of 80.46m, a mark above 80 meters that had not been reached by a French thrower since 2010 and 30 centimeters from the French record held by Stéphane Laporte. He withdrew from the 2021 European team championships due to an elbow injury.

He won gold in the javelin competition at the 2021 French Athletics Championships in Angers.

He won gold at the 2022 European Throwing Cup in Leiria.
