= 2021 French Athletics Championships =

- Edition: 133rd
- Dates: 25–27 June
- Host city: Albi
- Venue: Stade du Lac de Maine
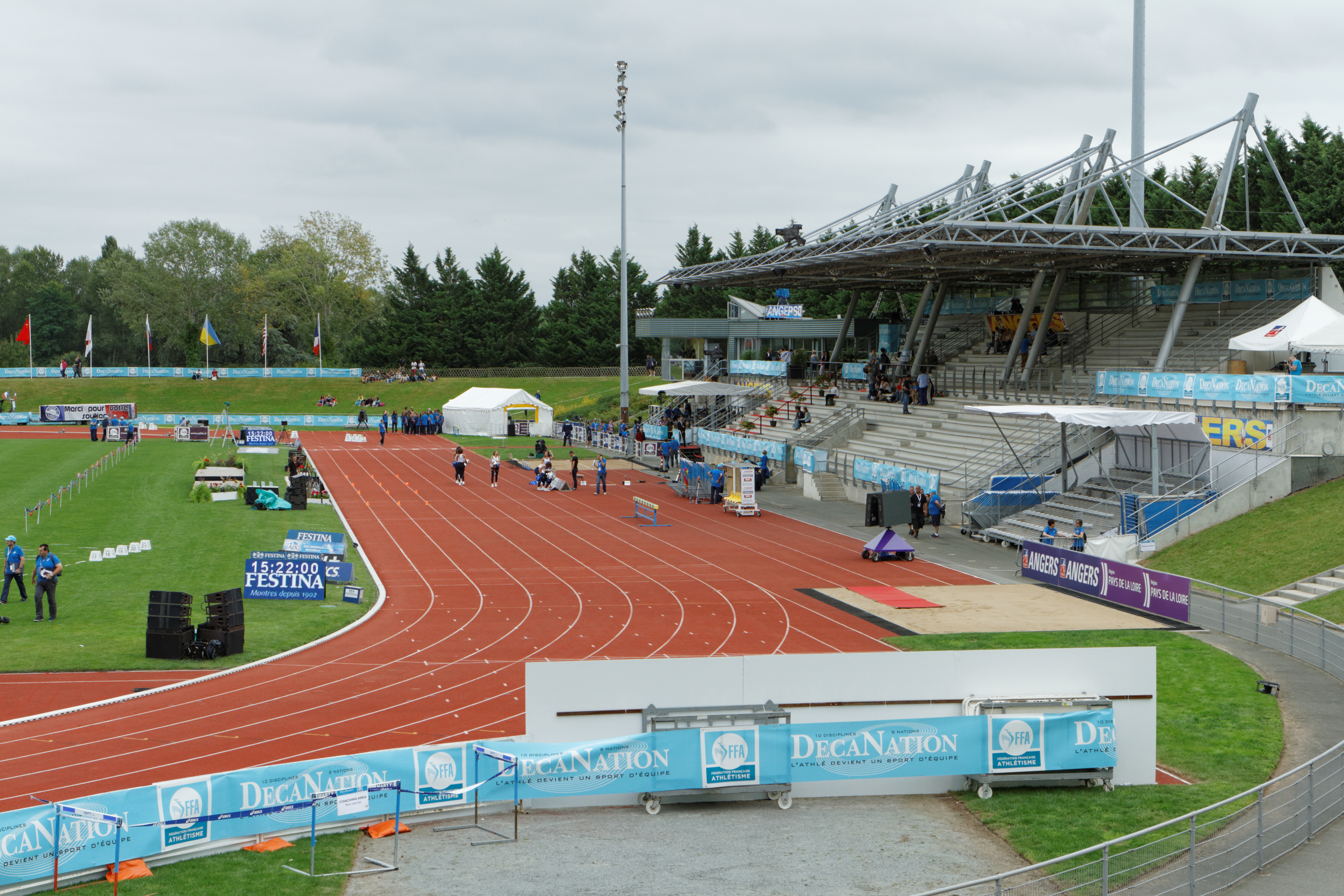
- Events: 38
- Participation: 658 athletes

The 2021 French Athletics Championships was the 133rd edition of the national championship in outdoor track and field for France. It was held on 25–27 June at Stade du Lac de Maine in Angers. A total of 38 events (divided evenly between the sexes) were contested over the two-day competition.

== Results ==
=== Men ===
Event	Gold		Silver		Bronze	
100 metres	Mouhamadou Fall	10.29	Méba-Mickaël Zeze	10.40	Ryan Zeze	10.49
200 metres	Mouhamadou Fall	20.61	Ryan Zeze	21.09	Jeff Erius	21.22
400 metres	Gilles Biron	45.99	Muhammad Abdallah Kounta	46.05 PB	Mame-Ibra Anne	46.27
800 metres	Benjamin Robert	1:48.46	Gabriel Tual	1:48.86	Hugo Houyez	1:49.52
1500 metres	Baptiste Mischler	3:42.57	Alexis Miellet	3:43.06	Azeddine Habz	3:43.25
5000 metres	Hugo Hay	13:34.08	Jimmy Gressier	13:35.94	Yann Schrub	13:37.22 PB
100 m hurdles	Wilhem Belocian	13.15 PB	Aurel Manga	13.24 PB	Just Kwaou-Mathey	13.40
400 m hurdles	Wilfried Happio	49.50	Ludvy Vaillant	50.05	Nicolas-Jean Moulin	50.98 PB
3000 m s'chase	Alexis Phelut	8:21.22	Djilali Bedrani	8:21.62	Louis Gilavert	8:24.55
10,000 m walk	Gabriel Bordier	39:31.61 PB	Kévin Campion	39:40.70	Aurélien Quinion	40:57.03 PB
High jump	Nathan Ismar	2.19 m	Maxime Dubiez	2.13 m	Sébastien Micheau Dorian Tharaud	2.13 m
Pole vault	Ethan Cormont	5.70 m	Renaud Lavillenie	5.70 m	Valentin Lavillenie	5.65 m
Long jump	Augustin Bey	7.90 m	Yann Randrianasolo	7.81 m	Jules Pommery	7.79 m
Triple jump	Jean-Marc Pontvianne	16.88 m	Benjamin Compaoré	16.79 m	Melvin Raffin	16.78 m
Shot put	Frédéric Dagée	20.75 m PB, NR CR	Yann Moisan	18.17 m PB	Antoine Duponchel	18.14 m
Discus throw	Tom Reux	60.68 m PB	Lolassonn Djouhan	60.33 m	Lael Tirnan	54.09 m PB
Hammer throw	Hugo Tavernier	72.80 m	Yann Chaussinand	72.58 m	Jean-Baptiste Bruxelle	70.33 m
Javelin throw	Teuraiterai Tupaia	79.05 m	Rémi Conroy	74.12 m	Lenny Brisseault	70.18 m
Decathlon	Ruben Gado	7627 pts	Arthur Prévost	7354 pts PB	Valentin Charles	7232 pts

=== Women ===
Event	Gold		Silver		Bronze	
100 metres	Orlann Ombissa-Dzangue	11.29	Cynthia Leduc	11.30 PB	Carolle Zahi	11.34
200 metres	Carolle Zahi	23.24	Gémima Joseph	23.37	Wided Atatou	23.38
400 metres	Amandine Brossier	51.47	Floria Gueï	51.77	Brigitte Ntiamoah	52.21 PB
800 metres	Rénelle Lamote	2:00.35	Charlotte Pizzo	2:01.40	Mériem Sahnoune	2:01.75 PB
1500 metres	Aurore Fleury	4:11.39	Charlotte Mouchet	4:11.90 PB	Bérénice Cleyet-Merle	4:11.97
5000 metres	Leila Hadji	15:48.74 PB	Alessia Zarbo	15:53.02	Susan Jeptooo Kipsang	15:54.84
110 m hurdles	Cyréna Samba-Mayela	12.80	Laura Valette	12.89	Fanny Quenot	12.97
400 m hurdles	Shana Grebo	56.84 PB	Camille Séri	57.14 PB	Agnès Raharolahy	57.16 PB
3000 m s'chase	Flavie Renouard	9:46.81	Alexa Lemitre	9:49.18 PB	Claire Palou	9:49.43
10,000 m walk	Clémence Beretta	44:47.78 PB	Pauline Stey	45:03.76 PB	Eloïse Terrec	45:29.48 PB
High jump	Laureen Maxwell	1.91 m PB	Solène Gicquel	1.89 m PB	Juliette Perez	1.82 m
Pole vault	Margot Chevrier	4.51 m PB	Jade Vigneron	4.30 m PB	Elina Giallurachis	4.30 m
Long jump	Yanis David	6.63 m	Marie-Jeanne Ourega	6.51 m	Rougui Sow	6.46 m
Triple jump	Victoria Josse	13.71 m PB	Jeanine Assani Issouf	13.66 m	Ilionis Guillaume	13.31 m
Shot put	Amanda Ngandu-Ntumba	16.28 m PB	Caroline Métayer	15.68 m	Nadège Mendy	15.01 m
Discus throw	Mélina Robert-Michon	60.88 m	Irène Donzelot	55.72 m	Amanda Ngandu-Ntumba	55.69 m
Hammer throw	Alexandra Tavernier	73.85 m	Rose Loga	69.48 m	Loreleï Taillandier	62.18 m
Javelin throw	Jöna Aigouy	56.64 m	Alizée Minard	54.00 m	Evelina Mendes	50.45 m
Heptathlon	Esther Turpin	5806 pts	Antoinette Nana Djimou	5738 pts	Annaelle Nyabeu Djapa	5729 pts
