= 2020 French Indoor Athletics Championships =

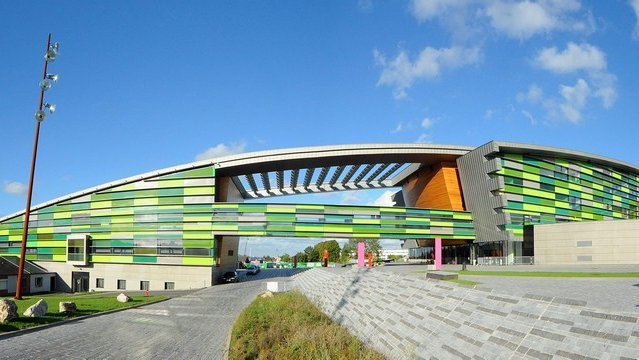
- The host stadium
- Dates: 29 February – 1 March
- Host city: Liévin
- Venue: Arena Stade Couvert de Liévin
- Events: 28

The 2020 French Indoor Athletics Championships was the 49th edition of the national championship in indoor track and field for France, organised by the French Athletics Federation. It was held on 29 February – 1 March at the Arena Stade Couvert de Liévin in Liévin. A total of 28 events (divided evenly between the sexes) were contested over the two-day competition. It was to serve as preparation for the 2020 World Athletics Indoor Championships, which was postponed due to the COVID-19 outbreak in China before the French championships.

== Results ==
=== Men ===
Event	Gold		Silver		Bronze	
60 metres	Marvin René	6.66	Amaury Golitin	6.74	Ryan Zeze	6.75
200 metres	Amaury Golitin	20.99	Gautier Dautremer	21.12	Pablo Mateo	21.34
400 metres	Lorenzo Ricque	47.28	Gilles Biron	47.29	Bastien Mandrou	47.54
800 metres	Maxence Bruyas	1:53.36	Hugo Houyez	1:53.44	Alexandre Selles	1:53.58
1500 metres	Pierrik Jocteur-Monrozier	3:48.16	Quentin Tison	3:49.68	Arthur Gervais	3:50.37
3000 metres	Azeddine Habz	7:57.20	Hugo Hay	7:58.48	Louis Gilavert	7:59.63
5000 m walk	Gabriel Bordier	19:03.49	David Kuster	19:54.65	Kyrian Vallée	20:46.97
60 m hurdles	Aurel Manga	7.65	Jeanice Laviolette	7.80	Matteo Ngo	7.85
High jump	Loïc Gasch	2.24 m	William Aubatin	2.18 m	Sébastien Micheau	2.18 m
Pole vault	Renaud Lavillenie	5.80 m	Valentin Lavillenie	5.70 m	Alioune Sene	5.60 m
Long jump	Augustin Bey	8.06 m	Jules Pommery	7.62 m	Tom Campagne	7.60 m
Triple jump	Melvin Raffin	16.80 m	Jonathan Seremes	16.39 m	Quentin Mouyabi	16.38 m
Shot put	Frédéric Dagée	19.07 m	Antoine Duponchel	18.20 m	Yann Moisan	17.97 m
Heptathlon	Ludovic Besson	5799 pts	Maxence Pecatte	5625 pts	Gaël Querin	5577 pts

=== Women ===
Event	Gold		Silver		Bronze	
60 metres	Cynthia Leduc	7.29	Nasrane Bacar	7.38	Marie-Ange Rimlinger	7.45
200 metres	Maroussia Paré	23.44	Hélène Parisot	23.93	Wided Atatou	23.97
400 metres	Amandine Brossier	53.83	Sounkamba Sylla	54.05	Farah Clerc	54.08
800 metres	Noélie Yarigo	2:06.79	Charlotte Pizzo	2:07.38	Léna Kandissounon	2:08.46
1500 metres	Emma Oudiou	4:21.61	Aurore Fleury	4:25.98	Coraline Maamouri	4:27.68
3000 metres	Bérénice Fulchiron	9:23.29	Alice Finot	9:23.75	Élodie Normand	9:24.72
3000 m walk	Clémence Beretta	12:30.52	Émilie Menuet	12:38.13	Marine Quennehen	13:07.56
60 m hurdles	Cyréna Samba-Mayela	8.06	Solenn Comper	8.14	Awa Sene	8.15
High jump	Claire Orcel	1.91 m	Solène Gicquel	1.84 m	Fanny Pinteau	1.81 m
Pole vault	Ninon Guillon-Romarin	4.65 m	Marion Lotout	4.55 m	Alice Moindrot	4.30 m
Long jump	Éloyse Lesueur-Aymonin	6.55 m	Hilary Kpatcha	6.36 m	Maelly Dalmat	6.33 m
Triple jump	Anne-Suzanna Fosther-Katta	13.57 m	Jeanine Assani Issouf	13.54 m	Nathalie Marie-Nely	12.86 m
Shot put	Jessica Cérival	16.36 m	Caroline Metayer	15.85 m	Amanda Ngandu-Ntumba	15.41 m
Pentathlon	Anaelle Nyabeu Djapa	4389 pts	Cassandre Aguessy Thomas	4359 pts	Esther Turpin	4330 pts
