= Sokhna Lacoste =

French sprinter

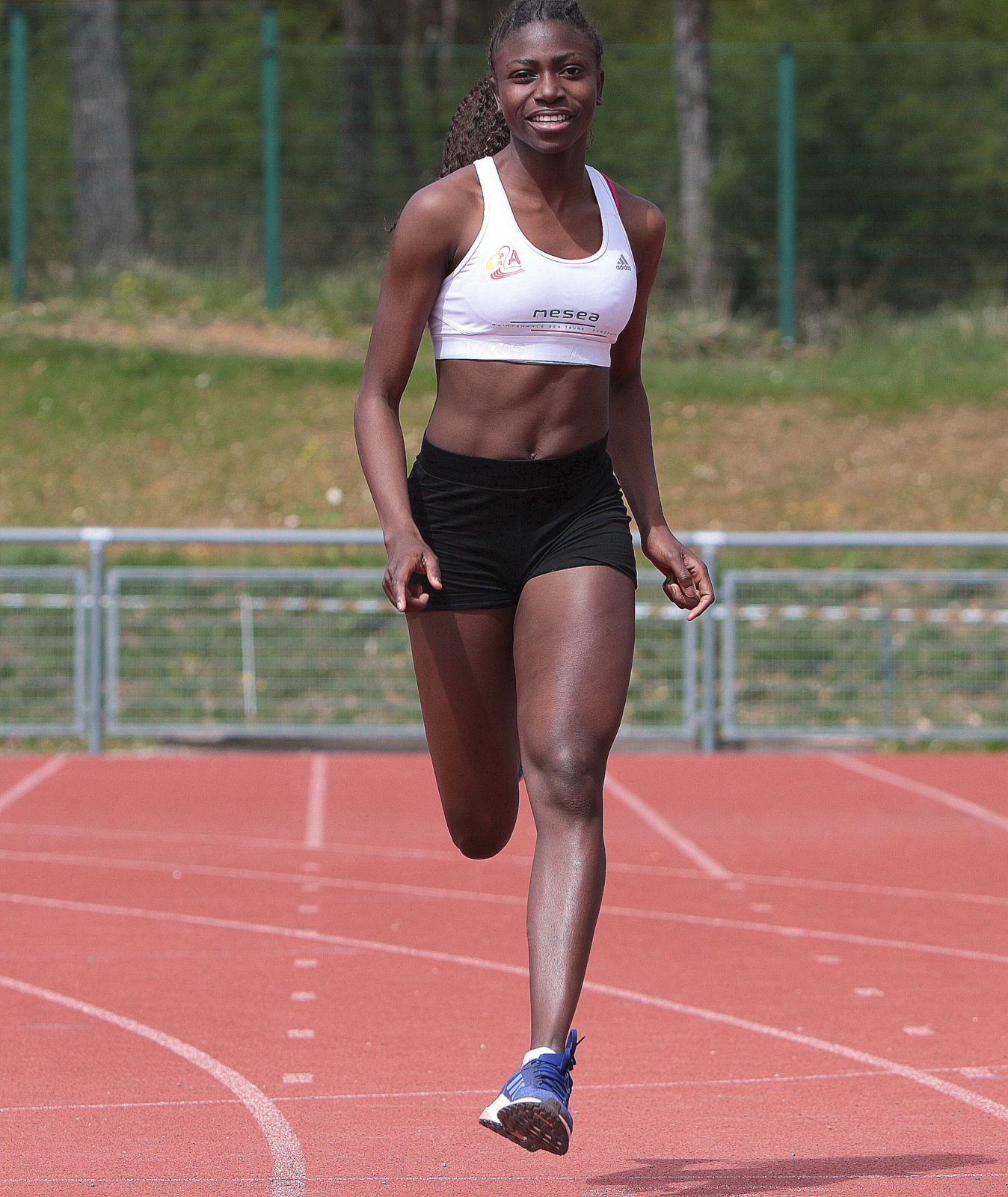
- Sokhna Lacoste

Personal information
- Nationality: French
- Born: Sokhna Diop; 25 August 2000 (age 26) Kaolack, Senegal
- Height: 172 cm (5 ft 8 in)
- Weight: 55 kg (121 lb)

Sport
- Country: France
- Sport: Athletics
- Event: Sprint
- Club: Grand Angoulême Athlétisme
- Coached by: Bastien Lacoste
Medal record
European U23 Championships
Silver medal – second place	2021 Tallinn	4 x 400 m relay

Sokhna Lacoste (née Diop, born 25 August 2000) is a French track and field sprinter. She represented France at the 2020 Summer Olympics in Tokyo 2021, competing in women's 4 × 400 metres relay.
