= Kinga Królik =

Polish steeplechase runner (born 1999)

Personal information
- Nationality: Poland
- Born: 26 September 1999 (age 26)
- Home town: Pabianice
- Height: 181 cm (5 ft 11 in)
- Weight: 52 kg (115 lb)

Sport
- Sport: Athletics
- Events: 3000 metres steeplechase 2000 metres steeplechase
- Club: UKS Azymut Pabianice

Achievements and titles
- National finals: 2016 Polish U18s; • 2000m s'chase, 1st (gold); 2018 Polish U20s; • 2000m s'chase, 1st (gold); • 1500m, 1st (gold); 2018 Polish Champs; • 1500m, 12th; 2019 Polish U23s; • 1500m, 5th; • 3000m s'chase, 3rd (bronze); 2019 Polish Champs; • 1500m, 10th; 2021 Polish Indoors; • 3000m, 2nd (silver); 2021 Polish Champs; • 3000m s'chase, 3rd (bronze); • 5000m, DNF; 2021 Polish U23s; • 3000m s'chase, 1st (gold); • 1500m, 5th; 2022 Polish Indoors; • 1500m, 6th; • 3000m, 2nd (silver); 2022 Polish Champs; • 10,000m, 4th; 2022 Polish Champs; • 3000m s'chase, 1st (gold); 2023 Polish Champs; • 3000m s'chase, 2nd (silver)
- Personal bests
Medal record
Women's athletics
Representing Poland
European U23 Championships
Silver medal – second place	2021 Tallinn	3000 m steeplechase
- Updated on 15 January 2024

Kinga Królik (born 26 September 1999) is a Polish steeplechase runner. She won the silver medal in the steeplechase at the 2021 European U23 Championships.

== Biography ==
Krolik is from Pabianice, Poland, where she competes representing the UKS Azymut Pabianice club.

Królik saw her first international success at the 2021 European Athletics U23 Championships, taking the silver medal in the steeplechase behind Flavie Renouard. She was in 2nd place at the halfway point as France led early on, but with 800 metres to go three French women took to the lead pack alongside Królik. On the final lap, Królik took the lead running at 19.1 kilometres per hour (11.9 mph) soon before Renouard surged ahead, leaving Królik to settle for silver. Her medal was said to be the greatest athletics success by a woman from Pabianice since Jadwiga Wajs.

By virtue of winning the 2022 Polish Athletics Championships, Królik won her first global championship berth at the 2022 World Athletics Championships steeplechase. She ran 9:44.74 in her heat, placing 36th overall and not qualifying for the finals.

Królik ran her personal best of 9:31.84 to finish runner-up at the 2023 Polish Athletics Championships.

== Statistics ==
=== Personal bests ===
Event	Mark	Place	Competition	Venue	Date	Ref
3000 metres steeplechase	9:31.84	2nd place, silver medalist(s)	Polish Athletics Championships	Gorzów Wielkopolski, Poland	27 July 2023	
2000 metres steeplechase	6:10.50	2nd place, silver medalist(s)	Volksbank Trier-Flutlichtmeeting	Trier, Germany	8 September 2023	
