= Greta Karinauskaitė =

Lithuanian athlete (born 2001)

Personal information
- Born: 11 February 2001 (age 25)

Sport
- Sport: Athletics
- Event: 3000 metres steeplechase
- Club: Šiauliai „Stadija“
- Coached by: Justinas Beržanskis

Achievements and titles
- Personal bests: 5000m: 15:36.86 (Palo Alto, 2023); 10,000m: 33:27.59 (Fullerton, 2023); 3000m Steeplechase: 9:26.88 (Sacramento, 2023) NR
Medal record
Women's athletics
Representing Lithuania
European Games
Bronze medal – third place	2023 Kraków-Małopolska	3000 m s'chase
European U23 Championships
Silver medal – second place	2023 Espoo	3000 m steeplechase

Greta Karinauskaitė (born 11 February 2001) is a Lithuanian athlete specialising in steeplechase running. She is a multiple-time national champion and in 2023, became Lithuanian national record holder for the 3000m steeplechase.

== Early life ==
From Šiauliai, Lithuania, she attended was educated at the Siauliai Didzdvaris gimnazium. She began to attend California Baptist University in the United States in 2021.

== Career ==
=== 2023 ===
On 27 May 2023, she broke Lithuanian national record for women's 3000m steeplechase with her new personal best of 9:26.88 whilst competing at the NCAA qualifiers in Sacramento, California. She beat the previous best mark set by Rasa Troup in 2008. Karinauskaitė won the bronze medal at the 2023 European Games in Silesia in the 3000m steeplechase event in June of that year. She then won a silver medal at the 2023 European Athletics U23 Championships in the 3000m steeplechase in Espoo, Finland in July 2023.

Competing in the 3000m steeplechase at the 2023 World Athletics Championships in Budapest, she finished sixth in her heat, running 9:30.28.

She competed at the 2023 European Cross Country Championships in Brussels, Belgium, where she finished in fifth place in the women's under-23 race, achieving the highest finish by a Lithuanian athlete in the history of the championships.

=== 2024 ===
She finished in fourth place in the 3000m steeplechase at the 2024 NCAA Division I Outdoor Track and Field Championships in Eugene, Oregon in June 2024, running a time of 9:36.54. Later that month, she won the Lithuanian Athletics Championships in the 3000m steeplechase.

She competed at the 2024 European Cross Country Championships in Antalya, Turkey.

=== 2025 ===
She set a new personal best for the 3000 metres running 9:08.35 indoors in Boston, Massachusetts in February 2025.

== International competitions ==
Year	Competition	Venue	Position	Event	Notes
Representing Lithuania
2019	European U20 Cross Country Championships	Lisbon, Portugal	40	Cross country	
2021	European U23 Championships	Tallinn, Estonia	6	3000m st	10:05.84
2022	European Championships	Munich, Germany	18	3000m st	9:55.11
2023	European Games	Chorzów, Poland	3	3000m st	9:28.48
