= Anne-Suzanna Fosther-Katta =

Franco-Cameroonian athlete (born 1998)

Anne-Suzanna Fosther-Katta (born November 13, 1998, in Paris) is a Franco- Cameroonian athlete, specializing in triple jump.

== Biography ==
Born on 13 November 1998, She has participated in various tournaments in and around Cameroon.

== Career ==
Bronze medalist at the 2018 French Athletics Championships in Albi, Anne-Suzanna Fosther-Katta was crowned French indoor triple jump champion in 2020 in Liévin and finished third at the 2021 French Indoor Athletics Championships in Miramas. She was crowned French triple jump champion in 2023 in Albi.

She represented Cameroon at the 2024 African athletes championship in Douala, winning the silver medal in the triple jump.

== See also ==
- French Athletics Federation
- Track & Field
- World Athletics
