= Ava O'Connor =

Irish athlete

Personal information
- Nationality: Ireland
- Born: 19 September 2003 (age 22)

Sport
- Sport: Athletics
- Event(s): Middle distance, Steeplechase, Cross-country

Achievements and titles
- Personal best(s): 1500m: 4:15.31 (Azusa, 2025); 3000m: 9:10.48 (Boston, 2023); 5000m: 15:49.65 (Azusa, 2025); 3000m Steeplechase: 9:45.00 (Lahti, 2025)

Ava O'Connor (born 19 September 2003) is an Irish track and field athlete and cross country runner.

== Early life ==
From Mountmellick in County Laois, the daughter of Liam and Sinead O'Connor, she started running for her local club Emo/Rath T a young age. She attended school at Scoil Chriost Rí, in Portlaoise. An Irish Dancer, she competed in the World Irish Dancing Championships. In 2017, she won three national track medals for her age group and was awarded the Athletics Ireland Star Award in February 2018. In 2020, she earned a scholarship to Adams State University in the United States.

== Career ==
She won the Junior 1500m title at the Irish U23 Outdoor Track and Field Championships in Tullamore in 2019. She was chosen to represent Ireland in the 1500m at the 2019 European Youth Summer Olympic Festival in Baku. She also won the Youth Nations Cup in Santry Stadium over 1500 metres in 2019.

In 2022, she began to compete at longer distances, competing over 3000m she ran a personal best at NCAA Indoors Track and Field Championships in Virginia Beach of 9.16.59 in February 2023. That year, she also began to run the 3000m steeplechase and ran a personal best in Azusa, California of 10.07.96. At the same event in Azusa she lowered her 1500m personal best to 4:20.04.

She made her senior international debut for Ireland at the 2023 European Athletics Team Championships. She finished third in the 3000m steeplechase to help Ireland win the Division Three title in Kraków.

She competed at the 2023 European Athletics U23 Championships in the women's 3000 metres steeplechase in Espoo in July 2023 and ran a personal best of 10:01.34.

She competed at the 2023 European Cross Country Championships in Brussels. In December 2023, she lowered her 3000m personal best to 9:10.48 in Boston, Massachusetts.

In April 2025, she set a new Irish U23 3000m Steeplechase record at the Bryan Clay Invitational in California, running a time of 9:46.22 to break by three seconds the previous record of Fionnuala McCormack that had stood since 2006.

She placed third in the 3000m Steeplechase competing for Ireland at the 2025 European Athletics Team Championships Second Division in Maribor in June 2025.
