= Clara Entresangle =

French steeplechase runner (born 2004)

Personal information
- Nationality: French
- Born: 23 November 2004 (age 21)
- Height: 160 cm (5 ft 3 in)
- Weight: 45 kg (99 lb)

Sport
- Country: France
- Sport: Athletics
- Events: Steeplechase, Cross country running
Medal record
Women's athletics
Representing France
Mediterranean Games
Bronze medal – third place	2026 Taranto	3000 m s'chase

Clara Entresangle (born 23 November 2004) is French steeplechaser and cross country runner.

== Biography ==
From Robion, and later Apt, Vaucluse, and a member of AS Cavaillon, Entresangle was French under 20 (U20) champion in the 2000 metres steeplechase in 2023. She participated at the 2023 European Cross Country Championships in Brussels, Belgium, where she finished 24th individually in the U20 race, and fourth with the French team in the U20 team event.

Having recovered from injury, Entresangle broke the ten-minute barrier for the 3000 metres steeplechase in 2025 for the first time, and reached the final of the 3000 metres steeplechase at the 2025 European Athletics U23 Championships in Bergen, Norway, finishing eleventh overall.

In March 2026, she won the gold medal in the short course race at the World University Cross Country Championships in Cassino, Italy. In July 2026, Entresangle ran a new 3000 metres personal best time of 9:17.88 at the Meeting National Est Lyonnais. She was runner-up that month over 1500 metres at the French U23 Championships, and also finished runner-up the following week behind Alice Finot in the 3000 metres steeplechase at the senior 2026 French Athletics Championships. She then placed sixth overall in the final of the 3000 metres steeplechase at the 2026 European Athletics Championships in Birmingham, England, in August 2026, finishing in 9:21.03. Later that month, Entresangle won the bronze medal in the 3000 metres steeplechase at the 2026 Mediterranean Games in Taranto, Italy.
