= Ilona Mononen =

Finnish athlete (born 2003)

- Mononen in 2026

Personal information
- Nationality: Finnish
- Born: 18 December 2003 (age 22)

Sport
- Sport: Athletics
- Events: Long distance running, Steeplechase

Achievements and titles
- Personal bests: 1500m: 4:14.79 (Joensuu, 2023); 3000m: 9:02.00 (Kuortane, 2023); 5000m: 15:41.82 (Tallinn, 2023); 3000m s'chase: 9:15.18 (Stockholm, 2026) NR
Medal record
Women's athletics
Representing Finland
European Athletics U23 Championships
Gold medal – first place	2025 Bergen	3000 m s'chase
European Athletics U20 Championships
Gold medal – first place	2021 Tallinn	3000 m
European Cross Country Championships
Silver medal – second place	2023 Brussels	U23 race
Silver medal – second place	2025 Lagoa	U23 race
Bronze medal – third place	2022 Turin	U20 race
Bronze medal – third place	2024 Antalya	U23 race
World University Games
Gold medal – first place	2025 Rhine-Ruhr	3000 m steeplechase

Ilona Mononen (born 18 December 2003) is a Finnish runner. She has won national indoor championship titles over 3000 metres and 5000 metres. She is the Finnish national record holder in the 3000 metres steeplechase.

== Biography ==
Mononen won the gold medal at the 2021 European Athletics U20 Championships in Tallinn over 3000 metres aged 17 years-old. At the 2021 World Athletics U20 Championships in Nairobi, she finished eighth in the 1500 metres and fourth in the 3000 metres.

At the 2022 World Athletics U20 Championships in Cali, Colombia she finished seventh in the 1500 metres and fifth over 3000 metres. She competed in the 5000 metres at the 2022 European Athletics Championships in Munich. At the 2022 European Cross Country Championships in Turin she won bronze in the U20 category in December 2022.

At the 2023 European Cross Country Championships she won silver in the under-23 category in Brussels. In February 2024, she ran a national record over 3000 metres to win the Nordic Championship.

Mononen ran a national record of 9:23.28 in the 3000m steeplechase at the 2024 European Athletics Championships in Rome in June 2024. She competed at the 2024 Summer Olympics in the Women's 3000 metres steeplechase. In December 2024, she won the bronze medal in the U23 race at the European Cross Country Championships in Antalya, Turkey.

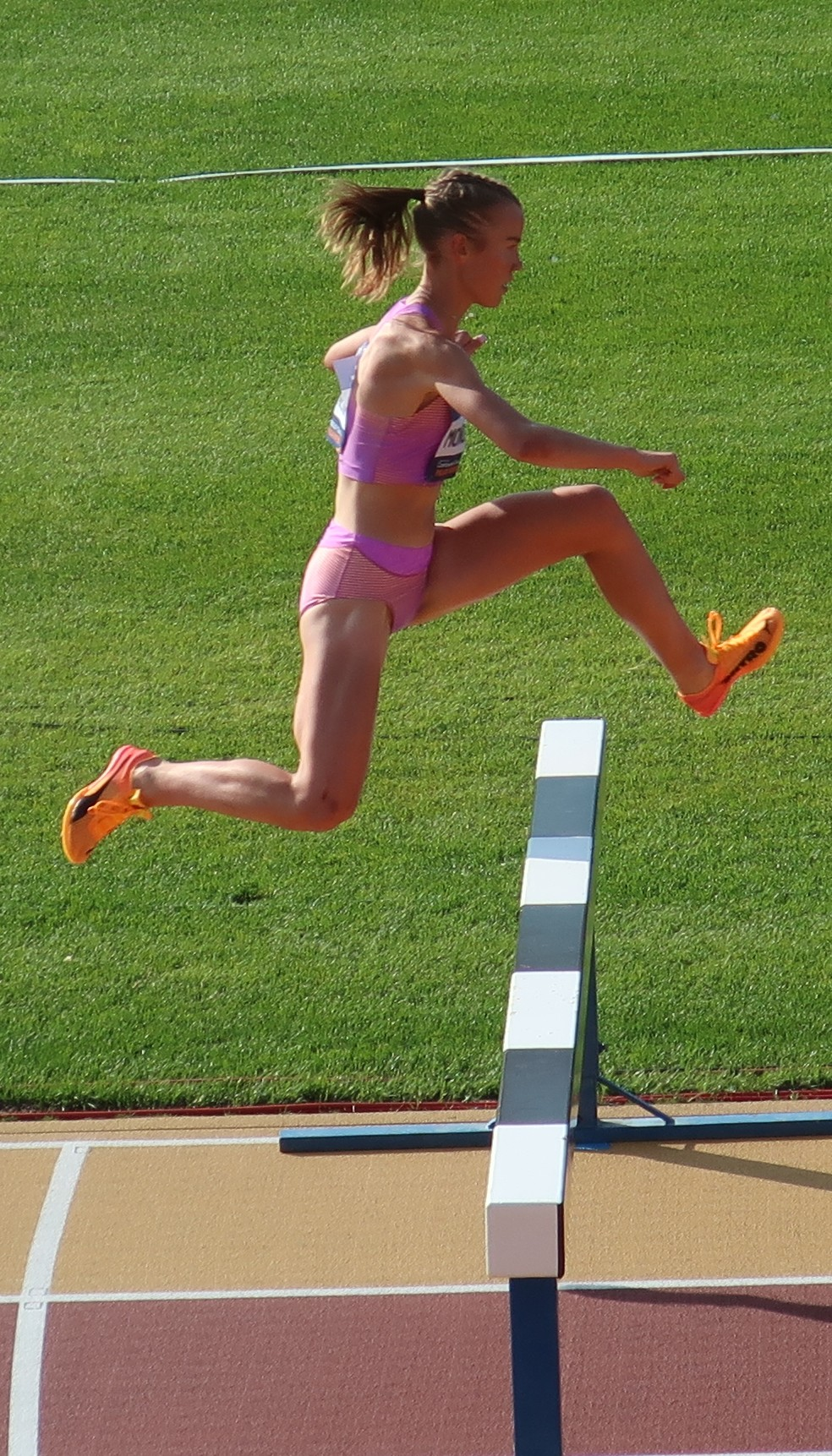
Mononen in Turku in 2025

Mononen won the 3000 metres at the Finnish Indoor Athletics Championships in February 2025, running a time of 9:14.06. She was selected to compete for Finland at the 2025 European Running Championships in Belgium in April 2025. Competing at the 2025 European Athletics Team Championships in Madrid on 29 June 2025, she won the 3000 metres steeplechase by 0.03 seconds from Sarah Tait of Great Britain. She ran 9:30.49 to win the gold medal in the 3000 metres steeplechase at the 2025 European Athletics U23 Championships in Bergen, Norway. That month, she also won the gold medal at the 2025 World Summer University Games in Bochum, over 3000 metres. Selected for the Finnish team for the 2025 World Athletics Championships in Tokyo, Japan, she lowered her national record to 9:21.02 but did not qualify for the final of the 3000 metres steeplechase.

On 14 December, she was silver medalist behind Maria Forero in the under-23 category at the 2025 European Cross Country Championships in Portugal. On 1 March 2026, she won the 3000 metres in 8.55.17 ahead of Nathalie Blomqvist at the Finish Indoor Championships in Espoo. She lowered her own 3000 m steeplechase national record to 9:18.50 finishing third behind Alemnat Walle and Gracie Hyde at the Paavo Nurmi Games in Turku on 3 June. On 7 June, she lowered it again with 9:15.18 at the Diamond League event in Stockholm. In August, she competed at the 2026 European Athletics Championships in Birmingham, England, in the 3000 metres steeplechase, qualifying for the final and placing eighth overall.
