= Shana Grebo =

French sprinter (born 2000)

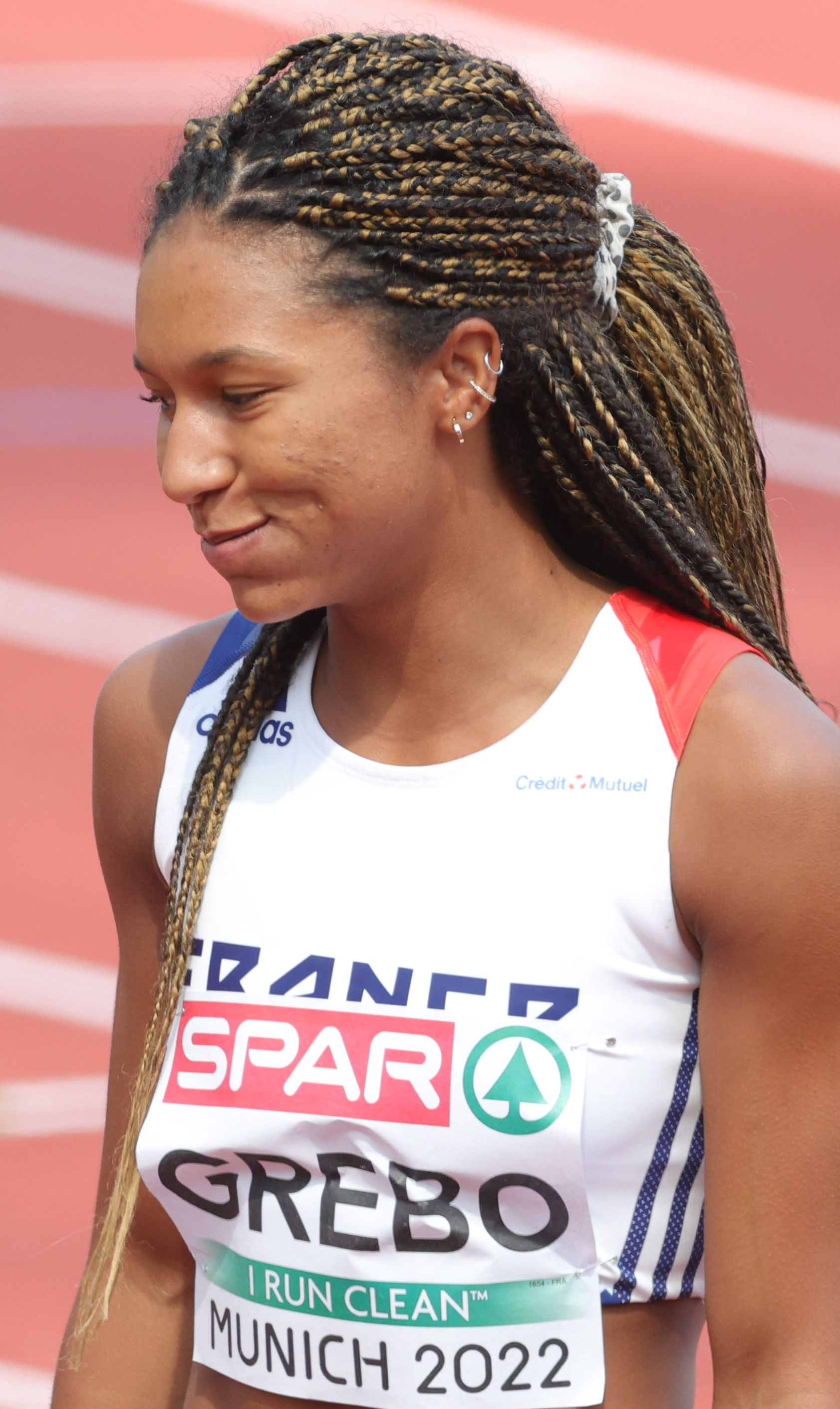
- Grebo in 2022

Personal information
- Born: 9 November 2000 (age 25) Rennes, France
- Height: 168 cm (5 ft 6 in)
- Weight: 60 kg (132 lb)

Sport
- Country: France
- Sport: Athletics
- Event: 400 m hurdles
- Club: Haute Bretagne Athlétisme
- Coached by: Ketty Cham
Medal record
European U23 Championships
Silver medal – second place	2021 Tallinn	4 x 400 m relay

Shana Grebo (born 9 November 2000) is a French athlete specialising in the 400 m hurdles.

Grebo won the gold medal at the 400 m hurdles at the 2021 French Athletics Championships in Angers with a time of 56.841. She won a silver medal in the 4 x 400 meters relay at the 2021 European Athletics U23 Championships in Tallinn.

Since September 2021, Grebo has been training with the University of Oregon in Eugene in the United States where she also studies.

== Biography ==
Shana Grebo won the 400-meter hurdles final at the 2021 French Track and Field Championships in Angers with a time of 56.84 seconds.

She won a silver medal in the 4 x 400-meter relay at the 2021 European Athletics U23 Championships in Tallinn.

She has been training since September 2021, while also pursuing her studies at the University of Oregon in Eugene, Oregon, United States.
