= Alice Finot =

French middle-distance runner (born 1991)

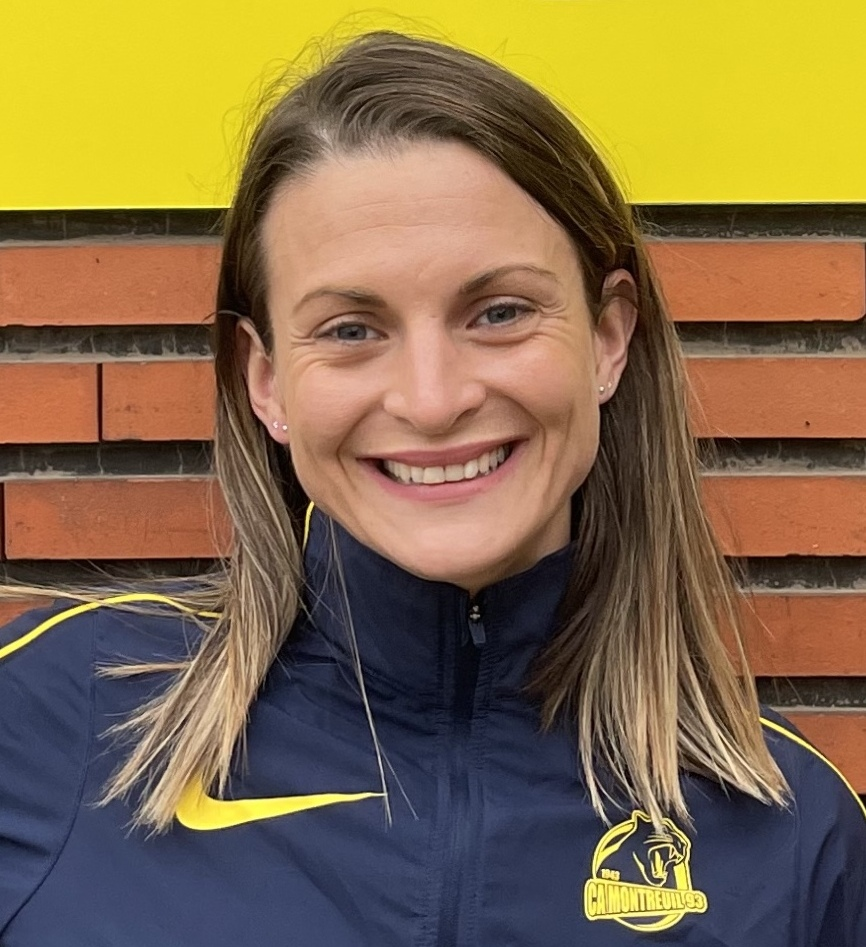

Personal information
- Nationality: French
- Born: 9 February 1991 (age 35) Montbéliard, France
- Height: 1.72 m (5 ft 8 in)
- Weight: 58 kg (128 lb)

Sport
- Sport: Athletics
- Event: 3000 metres
- Coached by: Manuel Ageito Martinez
Medal record
Women's athletics
Representing France
Event	1st	2nd	3rd
European Championships	1	1	0
European Indoor Championships	0	1	0
Total	1	2	0
European Championships
Gold medal – first place	2024 Rome	3000 m steeplechase
Silver medal – second place	2026 Birmingham	3000 m steeplechase
European Indoor Championships
Silver medal – second place	2021 Toruń	3000 m

Alice Finot (born 9 February 1991) is a French athlete. She was the 2024 European Champion in the 3000 metres steeplechase She is also the current European record holder in the distance.

== Career ==
In 2022 Finot had a breakthrough year, improving her personal best in the 3000 metres steeplechase by 31 seconds to 9:14.34, which she ran in the heats of the World Championships in Eugene, she went on to place tenth in the final.

Finot won the 3000 m steeplechase at the 2023 French Championships, securing her spot at the 2023 World Championships. At the Championships, she placed fifth (later upgraded to fourth) and improved her French national record to 9:06.15.

At the 2024 European Championships, Finot won gold with a time of 9:16.22. On August 6th 2024, Finot broke the European record in the 3000 m steeplechase at the Paris Olympics, running 8:58.67 in finishing fourth.

To celebrate her Olympic achievement, Finot proposed to her longtime partner, Bruno Martínez Bargiela, with a pin that read, "Love is in Paris". According to Connexion France, Finot told reporters that she planned to propose after completing the steeplechase in under nine minutes, with nine being her "lucky number" and the number of years she's been with Bargiela.

Finot won the silver medal in the 3000 metres steeplechase at the 2026 European Championships in Birmingham, England.
