= 2017 French Athletics Championships =

- Dates: 14–16 July
- Host city: Marseille
- Venue: Pierre-Delort Stadium
- Events: 38

The 2017 French Athletics Championships was the 129th edition of the national championship in outdoor track and field for France. It was held on 14–16 July at the Pierre-Delort Stadium in Marseille. A total of 38 events (divided evenly between the sexes) were contested over the three-day competition.

== Results ==
=== Men ===
Event	Gold		Silver		Bronze	
100 metres (wind: -1.4 m/s)	Christophe Lemaitre	10.34	Ben Bassaw	10.37	Emmanuel Biron	10.43
200 metres (wind: -0.8 m/s)	Jeffrey John	20.66	Christophe Lemaitre	20.70	Ismael Dop	21.28
400 metres	Teddy Atine-Venel	45.39	Mamoudou Hanne	45.82	Thomas Jordier	46.27
800 metres	Paul Renaudie	1:46.72	Carl Soudril	1:46.84	Hamid Oualich	1:47.28
1500 metres	Sofiane Selmouni	3:39.78	Florian Carvalho	3:40.61	Benjamin Rubio	3:43.53
5000 metres	François Barrer	14:23.12	Benjamin Choquert	14:27.55	Yann Schrub	14:30.92
110 m hurdles (wind: -0.9 m/s)	Aurel Manga	13.41	Simon Krauss	13.75	Nicolas Borome	13.84
400 m hurdles	Mamadou Kassé Hann	49.22	Thomas Delmestre	50.30	Stéphane Yato	50.32
3000 m s'chase	Yoann Kowal	8:39.19	Bouabdellah Tahri	8:43.70	Djiali Bedrani	8:43.78
5000 m walk	Kévin Campion	19:42.14	Antonin Boyez	20:21.26	Aurélien Quinion	21:03.81
High jump	Mickaël Hanany	2.24 m	Clément Gicquel	2.16 m	Abdoulaye Diarra Fabrice Saint-Jean	2.16 m
Pole vault	Renaud Lavillenie	5.80 m	Kévin Menaldo	5.70 m	Stanley Joseph	5.50 m
Long jump	Raihau Maiau	8.22 m (+ 3.4 m/s)	Kafétien Gomis	8.17 m (+ 2.3 m/s)	Jean-Pierre Bertrand	7.97 m (+ 1.6 m/s)
Triple jump	Jean-Marc Pontvianne	17.13 m (+ 2.1 m/s)	Benjamin Compaoré	16.94 m (+ 4.7 m/s)	Yoann Rapinier	16.86 m (+ 1.5 m/s)
Shot put	Frédéric Dagée	19.70 m	Stéphane Szuster	18.03 m	Gaëtan Bucki	17.89 m
Discus throw	Jordan Guehaseim	56.64 m	Stéphane Marthély	56.12 m	Dean-Nick Allen	52.97 m
Hammer throw	Quentin Bigot	77.87 m	Frederick Pouzy	67.29 m	Aymeric Joseph	61.94 m
Javelin throw	Jean-Baptiste Collet	70.00 m	Jérémy Nicollin	68.62 m	Ali-Hamidou Soultoini	67.96 m
Decathlon	Jérémy Lelièvre	7843 pts	Bastien Auzeil	7827 pts	Ruben Gado	7777 pts

=== Women ===
Event	Gold		Silver		Bronze	
100 metres (wind: +0.1 m/s)	Carolle Zahi	11.13	Orlann Ombissa-Dzangue	11.30	Orphée Néola	11.31
200 metres (wind: -3.1 m/s)	Jennifer Galais	23.82	Elise Trynkler	24.05	Eva Berger	24.26
400 metres	Elea-Mariama Diarra	51.92	Floria Gueï	52.08	Estelle Perrossier	52.18
800 metres	Manon Fage	2:05.10	Cynthia Anaïs	2:05.40	Clarisse Moh	2:06.32
1500 metres	Élodie Normand	4:16.56	Lucie Lerebourg	4:18.63	Maeva Danois	4:20.04
5000 metres	Liv Westphal	16:08.51	Samira Mezeghrane	16:20.23	Mélanie Doutart	16:36.07
100 m hurdles (wind: -1.2 m/s)	Pauline Lett	13.37	Awa Sene	13.39	Sandra Sogoyou	13.50
400 m hurdles	Maëva Contion	56.56	Aurélie Chaboudez	56.93	Anais Lufutucu	57.88
3000 m s'chase	Maeva Danois	10:01.65	Anne-Sophie Vittet	10:16.15	Ophélie Claude-Boxberger	10:23.42
5000 m walk	Amandine Marcou	23:38.55	Amélie Bourhis	24:47.38	Lucie Auffret	25:00.61
High jump	Prisca Duvernay	1.87 m	Marine Vallet	1.83 m	Solène Gicquel	1.83 m
Pole vault	Marion Lotout	4.30 m	Marion Buisson	4.30 m	Jade Vigneron Maria Leonor Tavares	4.30 m
Long jump	Éloyse Lesueur	6.93 m (+ 4.3 m/s)	Haoua Kessely	6.54 m (+ 2.6 m/s)	Pauline Lett	6.19 m (+ 2.8 m/s)
Triple jump	Jeanine Assani Issouf	14.48 m (+ 2.6 m/s)	Éloyse Lesueur	14.04 m (+ 0.5 m/s)	Nathalie Marie-Nely	13.64 m (+ 1.1 m/s)
Shot put	Jessica Cérival	16.38 m	Christine Gavarin	15.54 m	Caroline Metayer	15.18 m
Discus throw	Mélina Robert-Michon	60.46 m	Pauline Pousse	59.95 m	Irène Donzelot	55.42 m
Hammer throw	Alexandra Tavernier	64.76 m	Alice Delmer	61.76 m	Lætitia Bambara	59.70 m
Javelin throw	Alexia Kogut-Kubiak	55.90 m	Mathilde Andraud	53.82 m	Alexie Alaïs	53.51 m
Heptathlon	Laura Arteil	5896 pts	Lise Bara	5285 pts	Léa Fleury	5240 pts
