= 2018 French Athletics Championships =

- Dates: 6–8 July
- Host city: Albi
- Venue: Stadium Municipal d'Albi
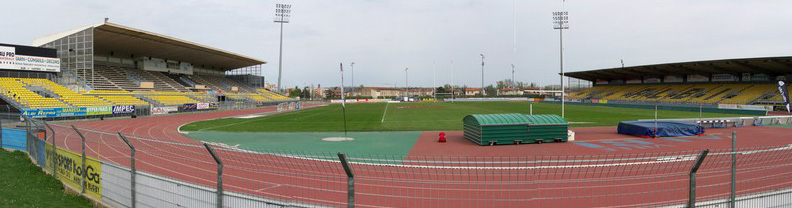
- Events: 38

The 2018 French Athletics Championships was the 130th edition of the national championship in outdoor track and field for France. It was held on 6–8 July at Stadium Municipal d'Albi in Albi. It was the third time that the city hosted the competition, following previous editions in 2008 and 2011. A total of 38 events (divided evenly between the sexes) were contested over the three-day competition.

Carolle Zahi took a women's sprint double in the 100 metres and 200 metres. Ninon Guillon-Romarin broke the French record for the women's pole vault with a height of 4.73 m (15 ft 6 in). On the men's side, Renaud Lavillenie won his eighth outdoor pole vault national title. Several non-French national athletes competed as guests and their performances were excluded for the purposes of the French Championships.

== Medal summary ==
=== Men ===
Event	Gold		Silver		Bronze	
100 metres	Marvin René	10.18	Méba-Mickaël Zézé	10.18	Mouhamadou Fall	10.22
200 metres	Méba-Mickaël Zézé	20.33	Jeffrey John	20.56	Ilies Tano	20.76
400 metres	Christopher Naliali	46.23	Thomas Jordier	46.41	Mame-Ibra Anne	46.63
800 metres	Pierre-Ambroise Bosse	1:46.66	Aymeric Lusine	1:47.91	Gabriel Tual	1:48.32
1500 metres	Alexis Miellet	3:43.77	Baptiste Mischler	3:44.86	Alexandre Saddedine	3:45.16
5000 metres	Florian Carvalho	13:41.91	Arsène Guillorel	13:50.47	Yann Schrub	13:56.12
110 m hurdles	Pascal Martinot-Lagarde	13.33	Garfield Darien	13.35	Simon Krauss	13.68
400 m hurdles	Ludvy Vaillant	49.04	Muhamad Kounta	49.41 PB	Victor Coroller	49.88
3000 m s'chase	Mahiedine Mekhissi-Benabbad	8:33.59	Djilali Bedrani	8:35.27	Yoann Kowal	8:35.71
5000 m walk	Gabriel Bordier	19:38.19	Keny Guinaudeau	20:41.88 PB	Antonin Boyez	21:24.17
High jump	Mickaël Hanany	2.19 m	Quentin Aboukir	2.16 m PB	Clément Gicquel	2.16 m
Pole vault	Renaud Lavillenie	5.80 m	Axel Chapelle	5.50 m	Baptiste Boirie	5.50 m
Long jump	Kafétien Gomis	8.13 m	Guillaume Victorin	8.00 m PB	Jean-Pierre Bertrand	7.96 m
Triple jump	Harold Correa	17.05 m	Kevin Luron	16.97 m	Yoann Rapinier	16.74 m
Shot put	Frédéric Dagée	20.01 m	Willy Vicaut	18.16 m	Antoine Duponchel	17.70 m
Discus throw	Lolassonn Djouhan	59.84 m	Jordan Guehaseim	55.22 m	Benoît Lallican	52.08 m
Hammer throw	Quentin Bigot	74.23 m	Yann Chaussinand	67.46 m	Frédérick Pouzy	66.91 m
Javelin throw	Jérémy Nicollin	73.86 m	Lukas Moutarde	69.40 m	Victor Vernede	69.24 m
Decathlon	Ruben Gado	8126 pts PB	Axel Hubert	7683 pts	Damien Berthenet	7573 pts

=== Women ===
Event	Gold		Silver		Bronze	
100 metres	Carolle Zahi	11.01 PB	Orlann Ombissa-Dzangue	11.06 PB	Orphée Néola	11.15 PB
200 metres	Carolle Zahi	22.92	Amandine Brossier	23.13	Jennifer Galais	23.27
400 metres	Floria Gueï	51.52	Elea-Mariama Diarra	52.27	Déborah Sananes	52.37
800 metres	Rénelle Lamote	2:00.37	Cynthia Anaïs	2:00.60 PB	Claudia Sanders	2:01.07
1500 metres	Élodie Normand	4:16.20	Lucie Lerebourg	4:20.00	Alice Finot	4:23.50
5000 metres	Liv Westphal	16:02.04	Mathilde Sénéchal	16:06.42	Emily de la Bruyère	16:15.39
100 m hurdles	Awa Sene	13.04	Laura Valette	13.10	Rosvitha Okou	13.20
400 m hurdles	Aurélie Chaboudez	56.62	Anaïs Lufutucu	56.95 PB	Maëva Contion	57.48
3000 m s'chase	Ophélie Claude-Boxberger	9:48.21	Emma Oudiou	9:59.22	Marie Bouchard	10:10.63
5000 m walk	Clémence Beretta	22:05.25	Émilie Menuet	22:36.24	Marine Quennehen	22:49.97 PB
High jump	Prisca Duvernay	1.85 m	Solène Gicquel	1.83 m	Laura Salin-Eyike	1.81 m
Pole vault	Ninon Guillon-Romarin	4.73 m NR	Marion Lotout	4.45 m	Marion Buisson	4.40 m
Long jump	Rougui Sow	6.49 m	Daniella Sacama-Isidore	6.32 m	Anne-Suzanna Fosther-Katta	6.28 m
Triple jump	Jeanine Assani Issouf	14.43 m PB	Yanis David	14.14 m	Rouguy Diallo	13.97 m
Shot put	Jessica Cérival	16.70 m	Caroline Métayer	16.29 m PB	Rose Sharon Pierre Louis	15.68 m
Discus throw	Pauline Pousse	58.09 m	Mélanie Pingeon	55.61 m	Marie-Francine Mvoto Abeng	54.79 m PB
Hammer throw	Alexandra Tavernier	73.72 m	Audrey Ciofani	68.57 m	Camille Sainte-Luce	67.48 m
Javelin throw	Alexie Alaïs	59.54 m	Evelina Mendes	55.14 m PB	Mathilde Andraud	53.74 m
Heptathlon	Esther Turpin	6100 pts	Diane Marie-Hardy	6015 pts	Cassandre Aguessy	5837 pts
