= 2019 French Athletics Championships =

- Dates: 26–28 July
- Host city: Saint-Étienne
- Venue: Stade Henri-Lux
- Events: 38

The 2019 French Athletics Championships was the 131st edition of the national championship in outdoor track and field for France. It was held on 26–28 July at Stade Henri-Lux in Saint-Étienne. A total of 38 events (divided evenly between the sexes) were contested over the three-day competition.

== Results ==
=== Men's ===
Event	Gold		Silver		Bronze	
100 metres	Amaury Golitin	10.45	François-Xavier Collatin	10.55	Jérémy Leroux	10.60
200 metres	Mouhamadou Fall	20.34 PB	Méba-Mickaël Zeze	20.44 PB	Jeffrey John	20.56
400 metres	Christopher Naliali	46.11 PB	Mame-Ibra Anne	46.17	Loïc Prévot	46.44
800 metres	Pierre-Ambroise Bosse	1:48.82	Gabriel Tual	1:49.13	Aymeric Lusine	1:50.25
1500 metres	Alexis Miellet	3:43.26	Rabii Doukkana	3:44.24	Pierrik Jocteur-Monrozier	3:45.28
5000 metres	Hugo Hay	14:10.65	Azeddine Habz	14:12.28	François Barrer	14:13.62
110 m hurdles	Wilhem Belocian	13.14	Pascal Martinot-Lagarde	13.41	Ludovic Payen	13.42
400 m hurdles	Wilfried Happio	49.26	Ludvy Vaillant	49.35	Victor Coroller	50.00
3000 m s'chase	Djilali Bedrani	8:34.00	Yoann Kowal	8:36.91	Abdelhamid Zerrifi	8:43.76
10 km walk	Kévin Campion	39:44	Gabriel Bordier	39:53 PB	Aurélien Quinion	43:26
High jump	William Aubatin	2.16 m	Sébastien Micheau	2.16 m PB	Youssef Benzamia	2.16 m
Pole vault	Renaud Lavillenie	5.85 m	Alioune Sene	5.51 m	Thibaut Collet	5.51 m
Long jump	Augustin Bey	8.08 m	Yann Randrianasolo	7.98 m	Guillaume Victorin	7.97 m
Triple jump	Benjamin Compaoré	16.94 m	Harold Correa	16.82 m	Yoann Rapinier	16.63 m
Shot put	Frédéric Dagée	19.69 m	Antoine Duponchel	18.82 m	Itamar Levi	17.54 m
Discus throw	Lolassonn Djouhan	60.64 m	Tom Reux	56.69 m	Dean-Nick Allen	54.78 m
Hammer throw	Quentin Bigot	75.73 m	Yann Chaussinand	69.41 m	Enguerrand Decroix Têtu	67.86 m
Javelin throw	Lukas Moutarde	78.53 m PB	Jérémy Nicollin	73.46 m	Rémi Conroy	72.81 m PB
Decathlon	Bastien Auzeil	7656 pts	Gaël Querin	7556 pts	Axel Hubert	7382 pts

=== Women's ===
Event	Gold		Silver		Bronze	
100 metres	Carolle Zahi	11.29	Orlann Ombissa-Dzangue	11.31	Orphée Néola	11.53
200 metres	Sarah Richard-Mingas	23.24	Maroussia Paré	23.28	Estelle Raffai	23.47
400 metres	Déborah Sananes	52.52	Amandine Brossier	52.89	Diana Iscaye	53.03
800 metres	Rénelle Lamote	2:02.49	Justine Fedronic	2:04.51	Charlotte Mouchet	2:05.52
1500 metres	Élodie Normand	4:22.68	Aurore Fleury	4:24.23	Lucie Lerebourg	4:26.22
5000 metres	Liv Westphal	15:55.58	Mathilde Sénéchal	16:10.99	Leila Hadji	16:18.13
100 m hurdles	Laura Valette	12.87 PB	Fanny Quenot	12.96 PB	Coralie Comte	12.98 PB
400 m hurdles	Aurélie Chaboudez	58.02	Farah Clerc	58.71	Camille Seri	58.84
3000 m s'chase	Emma Oudiou	9:51.80	Marie Bouchard	9:57.16	Ophélie Claude-Boxberger	10:06.15
10 km walk	Clémence Beretta	47:32	Laury Cerantola	49:40 PB	Maeva Casale	50:25 PB
High jump	Claire Orcel	1.94 m PB	Solène Gicquel	1.88 m PB	Prisca Duvernay	1.83 m
Pole vault	Ninon Guillon-Romarin	4.60 m	Marion Lotout	4.20 m	Alice Moindrot	4.20 m
Long jump	Hilary Kpatcha	6.44 m	Rougui Sow	6.25 m	Diane Mouillac	6.05 m
Triple jump	Rouguy Diallo	13.61 m	Maeva Phesor	13.39 m	Sokhna Galle	13.35 m
Shot put	Caroline Métayer	16.47 m PB	Rose Sharon Pierre-Louis	15.80 m	Ashley Bologna	15.57 m
Discus throw	Mélina Robert-Michon	60.55 m	Pauline Pousse	56.98 m	Irène Donzelot	56.29 m
Hammer throw	Alexandra Tavernier	69.75 m	Camille Sainte-Luce	64.22 m	Lætitia Bambara	60.91 m
Javelin throw	Alexie Alaïs	61.49 m CR PB	Alexia Kogut Kubiak	55.64 m	Evelina Mendes	54.20 m
Heptathlon	Antoinette Nana Djimou	5944 pts	Esther Turpin	5781 pts	Annaelle Nyabeu Djapa	5763 pts
