= 2016 French Athletics Championships =

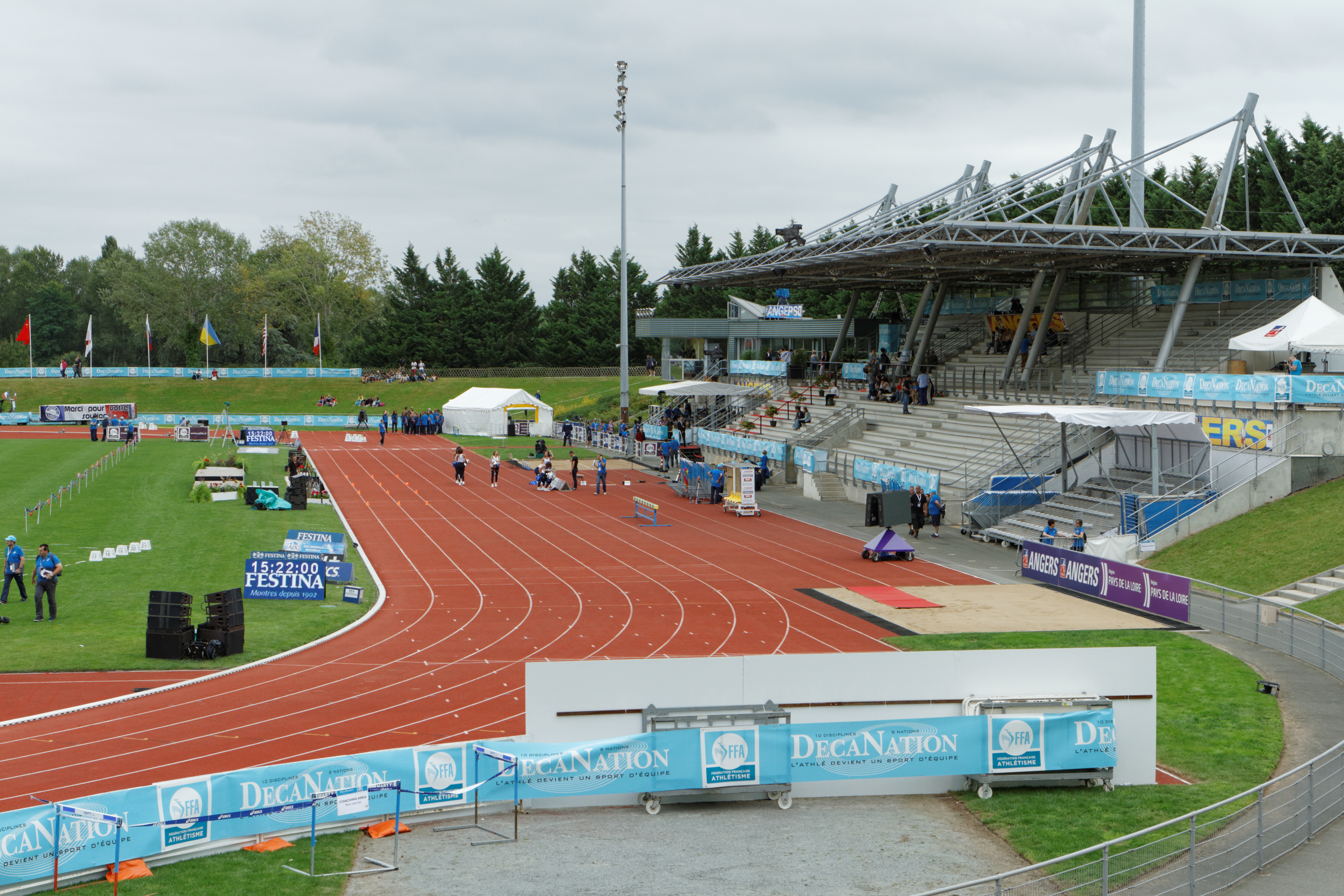
- The host stadium
- Dates: 24–26 July
- Host city: Angers
- Venue: Stade du Lac de Maine
- Events: 38

The 2016 French Athletics Championships was the 128th edition of the national championship in outdoor track and field for France. It was held on 24–26 July at the Stade du Lac de Maine in Angers. A total of 38 events (divided evenly between the sexes) were contested over the three-day competition.

== Results ==
=== Men ===
Event	Gold		Silver		Bronze	
100 metres	Jimmy Vicaut	9.88	Stuart Dutamby	10.12 PB	Méba-Mickaël Zézé	10.21 PB
200 metres	Jimmy Vicaut	20.62	Méba-Mickaël Zézé	20.69	Gautier Dautremer	20.96
400 metres	Thomas Jordier	45.72	Mame-Ibra Anne	46.07	Alexandre Divet	46.13
800 metres	Aymeric Lusine	1:50.16	Sofiane Selmouni	1:50.16	Nasredine Khatir	1:50.26
1500 metres	Florian Carvalho	3:44.70	Bryan Cantero	3:44.87	Martin Casse	3:45.58
5000 metres	Morhad Amdouni	14:12.33	Benjamin Pires	14:17.32	Valentin Pepiot	14:18.92
110 m hurdles	Dimitri Bascou	13.05	Wilhem Belocian	13.15	Aurel Manga	13.32
400 m hurdles	Mamadou Kassé Hann	50.26	Ludvy Vaillant	50.64	Thomas Delmestre	51.02
3000 m s'chase	Mahiedine Mekhissi-Benabbad	8:29.01	Djilali Bedrani	8:36.30	Valentin Pépiot	8:36.62
5000 m walk	Kévin Campion	18:59.46	Antonin Boyez	19:45.47	Jean Blancheteau	20:05.82
High jump	Mickaël Hanany	2.21 m	Abdoulaye Diarra	2.12 m	Clément Gicquel Sébastien Deschamps Florian Labourel	2.12 m
Pole vault	Renaud Lavillenie	5.95 m WL	Kévin Menaldo	5.80 m SB	Stanley Joseph	5.75 m PB
Long jump	Jean-Pierre Bertrand	8.01 m	Kafétien Gomis	7.93 m	Salim Sdiri	7.89 m
Triple jump	Teddy Tamgho	17.15 m SB	Harold Correa	16.95 m	Kevin Luron	16.89 m
Shot put	Frédéric Dagée	19.21 m	Gaëtan Bucki	19.02 m	Willy Vicaut	18.05 m
Discus throw	Lolassonn Djouhan	60.81 m	Stéphane Marthely	56.13 m	Dean-Nick Allen	55.08 m
Hammer throw	Jérôme Bortoluzzi	72.81 m	Frédérick Pouzy	67.43 m	Kévin Nabialek	63.75 m
Javelin throw	Killian Durechou	75.35 m	Jérémy Nicollin	74.24 m	Lukas Moutarde	70.12 m
Decathlon	Bastien Auzeil	8191 pts	Florian Geffrouais	8073 pts	Jérémy Lelièvre	7807 pts

=== Women ===
Event	Gold		Silver		Bronze	
100 metres	Stella Akakpo	11.17 PB	Floriane Gnafoua	11.20 PB	Céline Distel-Bonnet	11.32
200 metres	Jennifer Galais	23.36	Maroussia Paré	23.54	Elise Trinkler	23.71
400 metres	Floria Gueï	51.21	Marie Gayot	52.29	Brigitte Ntiamoah	52.31
800 metres	Rénelle Lamote	2:02.09	Justine Fedronic	2:02.79	Corane Gazeau	2:04.03
1500 metres	Élodie Normand	4:13.39	Lucie Lerebourg	4:16.27	Aurore Fleury	4:19.56
5000 metres	Alice Rocquain	16:20.28	Lucie Picard	16:28.52	Samira Mezeghrane-Saad	16:34.28
100 m hurdles	Cindy Billaud	12.83 SB	Sandra Gomis	13.01	Aïsseta Diawara	13.17
400 m hurdles	Phara Anacharsis	57.01	Maëva Contion	57.53	Anaïs Lufutucu	57.66
3000 m s'chase	Aisse Sow	9:54.18	Maeva Danois	9:54.36	Claire Perraux	10:02.79
5000 m walk	Émilie Menuet	21:51.91	Violaine Averous	22:56.69	Amandine Marcou	23:10.21
High jump	Marine Vallet	1.88 m PB	Nawal Meniker	1.84 m	Solène Gicquel	1.80 m
Pole vault	Ninon Guillon-Romarin	4.40 m	Vanessa Boslak	4.30 m	Maria Leonor Tavares	4.20 m
Long jump	Haoua Kessely	6.41 m	Rougui Sow	6.39 m	Éloyse Lesueur	6.34 m
Triple jump	Jeanine Assani Issouf	14.40 m PB	Nathalie Marie-Nely	14.01 m	Rouguy Diallo	13.88 m
Shot put	Jessica Cérival	17.47 m	Rose Sharon Pierre Louis	15.81 m	Caroline Metayer	15.21 m
Discus throw	Mélina Robert-Michon	63.40 m	Pauline Pousse	62.68 m PB	Mélanie Pingeon	52.79 m
Hammer throw	Alexandra Tavernier	66.73 m	Lætitia Bambara	66.65 m	Amy Sène	64.10 m
Javelin throw	Mathilde Andraud	54.05 m	Séphora Bissoly	53.90 m	Alexie Alaïs	53.89 m
Heptathlon	Annaelle Nyabeu Djapa	5768 pts	Laura Arteil	5735 pts	Sandra Jacmaire	5626 pts
