= 2014 French Athletics Championships =

- Dates: 11–13 July
- Host city: Reims
- Venue: Stade Georges-Hébert
- Events: 38

The 2014 French Athletics Championships was the 126th edition of the national championship in outdoor track and field for France. It was held on 11–13 July at the Stade Georges-Hébert in Reims. A total of 38 events (divided evenly between the sexes) were contested over the three-day competition.

== Results ==
=== Men ===
Event	Gold		Silver		Bronze	
100 metres	Christophe Lemaitre	10.14	Ben Bassaw	10.34	Ken Romain	10.42
200 metres	Christophe Lemaitre	20.53	Teddy Tinmar	20.79 PB	Pierre Vincent	20.84
400 metres	Mame-Ibra Anne	45.80	Teddy Atine-Venel	45.94	Thomas Jordier	46.00 PB
800 metres	Pierre-Ambroise Bosse	1:45.57 CR	Paul Renaudie	1:47.36	Sofiane Selmouni	1:47.96
1500 metres	Mahiedine Mekhissi-Benabbad	3:46.75	Florian Carvalho	3:46.98	Bouabdellah Tahri	3:47.14
5000 metres	Bouabdellah Tahri	14:20.66	Yassine Mandour	14:23.41	Hassan Chahdi	14:24.23
10,000 m walk	Yohann Diniz	38:08.13 WL PB	Kévin Campion	40:01.50	Antonin Boyez	40:58.12
110 m hurdles	Pascal Martinot-Lagarde	13.10	Dimitri Bascou	13.44	Simon Krauss	13.53
400 m hurdles	Adrien Clémenceau	50.05	Stéphane Yato	50.40	Medhi Omara Besson	50.60
3000 m s'chase	Yoann Kowal	8:49.14	Tanguy Pepiot	8:50.07	Romain Collenot-Spriet	8:50.17
4 × 100 m relay	EFS Reims Athlétisme	39.79	Val-de-Reuil AC	40.98	Montpellier Agglo Athletic Club	41.61
High jump	Mickaël Hanany	2.25 m	Florian Labourel	2.22 m =PB	Sébastien Deschamps	2.13 m
Pole vault	Renaud Lavillenie	5.80 m	Damiel Dossévi	5.60 m	Alexandre Marchand	5.55 m PB
Long jump	Salim Sdiri	7.96 m	Kafétien Gomis	7.75 m	Yann Randrianasolo	7.72 m
Triple jump	Yoann Rapinier	17.16 m	Benjamin Compaoré	16.89 m	Karl Taillepierre	16.54 m
Shot put	Gaëtan Bucki	20.01 m	Tumatai Dauphin	19.01 m	Frédéric Dagée	18.50 m
Discus throw	Lolassonn Djouhan	57.90 m	Stéphane Marthély	55.67 m	Jean-François Aurokiom	54.32 m
Hammer throw	Jérôme Bortoluzzi	74.01 m	Frédérick Pouzy	72.24 m	Aurélien Boisrond	70.26 m
Javelin throw	Jérémy Nicollin	74.41 m PB	Killian Duréchou	73.29 m	Lucas Leroy	69.49 m
Decathlon	Florian Geffrouais	8164 pts PB	Gaël Querin	8124 pts	Maxime Maugein	7764 pts

=== Women ===
Event	Gold		Silver		Bronze	
100 metres (wind: +2.1 m/s)	Myriam Soumaré	11.08 w	Ayodelé Ikuesan	11.16 w	Céline Distel-Bonnet	11.18 w
200 metres (wind: +1.6 m/s)	Céline Distel-Bonnet	24.09	Jennifer Galais	24.19	Brigitte Ntiamoah	24.40
400 metres	Marie Gayot	52.27	Floria Gueï	52.58	Estelle Perrossier	52.99
800 metres	Rénelle Lamote	2:02.01	Justine Fedronic	2:02.69	Clarisse Moh	2:02.78
1500 metres	Clémence Calvin	4:16.21 PB	Charlène Puel	4:16.34 PB	Sandra Beuvière	4:17.11
5000 metres	Laila Traby	15:59.60	Christine Bardelle	16:03.52	Sophie Duarte	16:04.64
10,000 m walk	Emilie Tissot	46:36.92 PB	Violaine Averous	46:51.40 PB	Émilie Menuet	47:27.48 PB
100 m hurdles	Cindy Billaud	12.58	Reïna-Flor Okori	13.01	Aisseta Diawara	13.13
400 m hurdles	Aurélie Chaboudez	57.36	Maëva Contion	57.68 =PB	Phara Anacharsis	57.85
3000 m s'chase	Claire Perraux	9:58.09	Aisse Sow	10:07.54 PB	Fanjanteino Félix	10:10.39
4 × 100 m relay	Sud Oise Athlétisme	46.27	Athlé Sud 77	47.31	Entente Athlétique Grenoble 38	47.32
High jump	Mélanie Melfort	1.85 m	Marine Vallet	1.82 m	Nawal Meniker Dior Delophont	1.82 m
Pole vault	Vanessa Boslak	4.45 m	Marion Fiack	4.40 m	Marion Lotout	4.40 m
Long jump	Éloyse Lesueur	6.86 m CR	Marquilu Nervilus	6.30 m	Amandine Raffin	6.23 m
Triple jump	Nathalie Marie-Nely	13.91 m	Teresa Nzola Meso Ba	13.57 m	Jeanine Assani Issouf	13.55 m
Shot put	Jessica Cérival	17.02 m	Fabienne Digard	16.04 m	Rose Pierre-Louis	14.86 m
Discus throw	Mélina Robert-Michon	61.42 m	Pauline Pousse	55.05 m	Mélanie Pigeon	51.40 m
Hammer throw	Alexandra Tavernier	66.99 m	Jessika Guehaseim	65.46 m	Lætitia Bambara	65.23 m
Javelin throw	Mathilde Andraud	58.25 m =PB	Sephora Bissoly	55.22 m	Alexia Kogut-Kubiak	54.77 m
Heptathlon	Yasmina Omrani	5629 pts	Marisa De Aniceto	5556 pts	Sandra Jacmaire	5466 pts
