= 2015 French Athletics Championships =

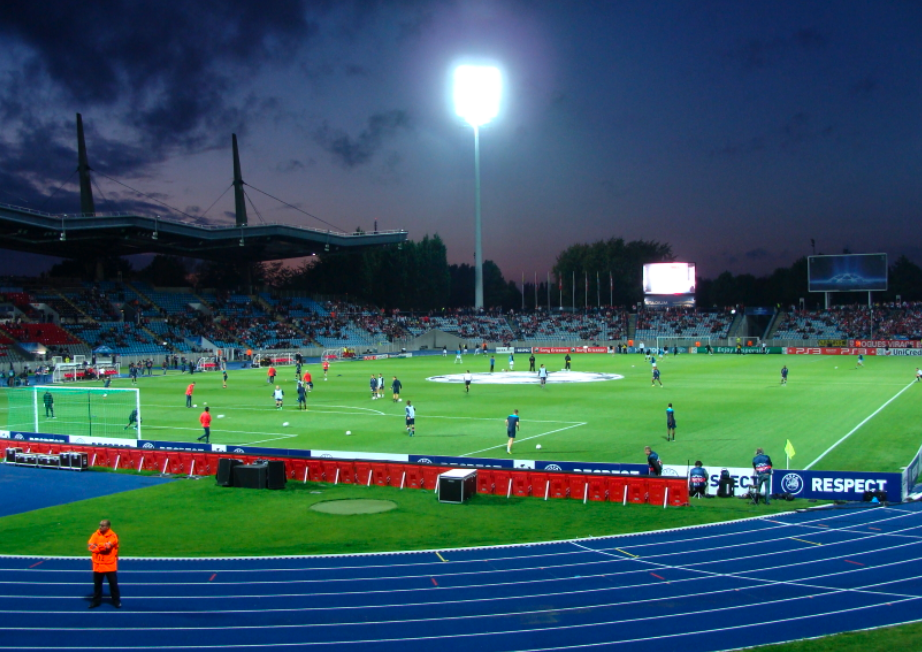
- The host stadium
- Dates: 10–12 July
- Host city: Villeneuve-d'Ascq
- Venue: Stadium Lille Métropole
- Events: 38

The 2015 French Athletics Championships was the 127th edition of the national championship in outdoor track and field for France. It was held on 10–12 July at the Stadium Lille Métropole in Villeneuve-d'Ascq. A total of 38 events (divided evenly between the sexes) were contested over the three-day competition.

== Results ==
=== Men ===
Event	Gold		Silver		Bronze	
100 metres	Jimmy Vicaut	9.92	Christophe Lemaitre	10.07	Emmanuel Biron	10.20
200 metres	Christophe Lemaitre	20.28	Jimmy Vicaut	20.42	Jeffrey John	20.61
400 metres	Teddy Atine-Venel	45.72	Mamoudou Hanne	45.80	Mame-Ibra Anne	45.97
800 metres	Pierre-Ambroise Bosse	1:46.69	Julien Duchateau	1:48.13	Mounir Hsain	1:48.32
1500 metres	Morhad Amdouni	3:48.58	Bryan Cantero	3:49.64	Samir Dahmani	3:50.19
5000 metres	Benjamin Choquert	14:10.41	Michael Gras	14:12.37	Pierre Urruty	14:20.49
10,000 m walk	Kévin Campion	41:11.73	Cédric Houssaye	43:21.88	Hugo Andrieu	44:44.33
110 m hurdles	Garfield Darien	13.17	Pascal Martinot-Lagarde	13.27	Dimitri Bascou	13.38
400 m hurdles	Mickaël François	50.29	Stéphane Yato	50.33	Martin Carrère	50.44
3000 m s'chase	Yoann Kowal	8:37.41	Mathieu Bazin	8:41.61	Tanguy Pepiot	8:42.30
4 × 100 m relay	EFS Reims	39.90	Montpellier agglo athlétic med	40.76	ES Montgeron	40.99
High jump	Mickaël Hanany	2.24 m	Gaël Rotardier Fabrice Saint-Jean	2.12 m	Not awarded	
Pole vault	Renaud Lavillenie	5.85 m	Kévin Menaldo	5.75 m	Stanley Joseph	5.55 m
Long jump	Kafétien Gomis	7.78 m	Raihau Maiau	7.69 m	Salim Sdiri	7.59 m
Triple jump	Harold Correa	16.78 m	Louis-Grégory Occin	16.41 m	Kévin Luron	16.25 m
Shot put	Gaëtan Bucki	19.72 m	Frédéric Dagée	19.36 m	Tumatai Dauphin	19.33 m
Discus throw	Lolassonn Djouhan	59.54 m	Dean-Nick Allen	54.30 m	Loic Fournet	53.85 m
Hammer throw	Jérôme Bortoluzzi	73.65 m	Nicolas Figère	70.32 m	Frédérick Pouzy	69.84 m
Javelin throw	Jérôme Haeffler	70.40 m	Killian Duréchou	69.31 m	Ali Hamidou Soultoini	67.48 m
Decathlon	Gaël Querin	7738 pts	Théo Mancheron	7260 pts	Franck Logel	7172 pts

=== Women ===
Event	Gold		Silver		Bronze	
100 metres	Véronique Mang	11.59	Céline Distel-Bonnet	11.59	Sarah Goujon	11.60
200 metres	Lénora Guion-Firmin	23.64	Mathlde Lagui	24.03	Hélène Parisot	24.09
400 metres	Floria Gueï	51.06 PB	Marie Gayot	51.27 PB	Estelle Perrossier	52.27
800 metres	Lisa Blamèble	2:05.00	Imane Boukharta	2:05.43	Clarisse Moh	2:05.74
1500 metres	Élodie Normand	4:19.23	Ophélie Claude-Boxberger	4:21.81	Christine Bardelle	4:21.96
5000 metres	Clémence Calvin	16:16.73	Christine Bardelle	16:27.92	Aurore Guérin	16:30.04
10,000 m walk	Émilie Menuet	44:58.06	Corinne Baudoin	46:53.75	Violaine Averous	48:46.45
100 m hurdles	Cindy Billaud	12.89	Alice Decaux	13.02	Sandra Gomis	13.18
400 m hurdles	Maëva Contion	56.03	Fanny Lefevre	57.45	Merryl Mbeng	57.75
3000 m s'chase	Ophélie Claude-Boxberger	9:59.86	Marie Bouchard	10:09.47	Fanjanteino Félix	10:17.95
4 × 100 m relay	Athlé Sud 77	45.76	Entente Oise athlétisme	45.94	Haute-Bretagne athlétisme	45.97
High jump	Sandrine Champion	1.85 m	Laura Salin-Eyike	1.82 m	Marine Vallet	1.79 m
Pole vault	Marion Lotout	4.40 m	Sophie Dangla Anaïs Poumarat	4.05 m	Not awarded	
Long jump	Haoua Kessely	6.13 m	Diane Barras	6.17 m	Rouguy Sow	6.14 m
Triple jump	Teresa Nzola Meso Ba	13.69 m	Jeanine Assani Issouf	13.63 m	Amy Zongo	13.60 m
Shot put	Jessica Cérival	17.29 m	Rose Sharon Pierre-Louis	15.67 m	Myriam Lixfe	14.96 m
Discus throw	Mélina Robert-Michon	62.57 m	Pauline Pousse	57.94 m	Lucie Catouillart	53.70 m
Hammer throw	Lætitia Bambara	66.40 m	Jessika Guehaseim	66.30 m	Amy Sène	65.24 m
Javelin throw	Mathilde Andraud	59.05 m	Alexia Kogut Kubiak	53.64 m	Sephora Bissoly	53.62 m
Heptathlon	Gaëlle Le Foll	5848 pts	Annaelle Nyabeu Djapa	5738 pts	Sandra Jacmaire	5569 pts
