= 2020 French Athletics Championships =

- Edition: 132nd
- Dates: 12–13 September
- Host city: Albi
- Venue: Stadium Municipal d'Albi
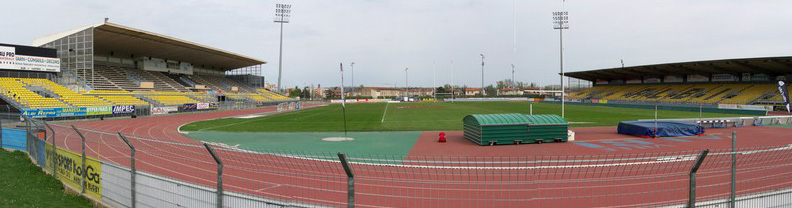
- Events: 36

The 2020 French Athletics Championships was the 132nd edition of the national championship in outdoor track and field for France. It was held on 12–13 September at Stadium Municipal d'Albi in Albi. A total of 36 events (divided evenly between the sexes) were contested over the two-day competition. The combined track and field events were held separately on 19–20 September at the Stade de Lattre-de-Tassigny in Aubagne.

On 3 April the French Athletics Federation declared that the competition would be postponed from its original setting in Angers from 19 to 21 June, due to the COVID-19 pandemic.

The event was broadcast live on television via L'Équipe. Claire Bricogne, François-Xavier de Châteaufort, Bouabdellah Tahri and Jimmy Vicaut provided commentary and analysis.

== Programme ==
Finals	12 September	13 September
Men	100 m, 5000 m, 3000 m s'chase high jump, pole vault, triple jump, shot put, hammer throw, javelin throw	200 m, 400 m, 800 m, 1500 m, 10,000 m walk, 110 m hurdles, 400 m hurdles long jump, discus throw
Women	100 m, 1500 m, 5000 m, 100 m hurdles long jump, shot put, javelin throw	200 m, 400 m, 800 m, 400 m hurdles, 3000 m s'chase, 10,000 m walk high jump, pole vault, triple jump, hammer throw, discus throw

== Results ==
=== Men ===
Event	Gold		Silver		Bronze	
100 metres	Mouhamadou Fall	10.16	Amaury Golitin	10.19	Dylan Rigot	10.30
200 metres	Amaury Golitin	20.67 PB	Sasha Zhoya	20.68 PB	Pablo Mateo	20.99
400 metres	Ludvy Vaillant	45.46	Téo Andant	46.80 PB	Dylan Chesneau	47.08 PB
800 metres	Benjamin Robert	1:48.68	Renaud Rosière	1:48.89	Julian Ranc	1:49.23
1500 metres	Alexis Miellet	3:40.92	Baptiste Mischler	3:40.97	Quentin Tison	3:41.17
5000 metres	Jimmy Gressier	13:33.08	Fabien Palcau	13:35.61 PB	Dorian Coninx	13:40.11 PB
110 m hurdles	Wilhem Belocian	13.20	Jeanice Laviolette	13.52 PB	Just Kwaou-Mathey	13.61 PB
400 m hurdles	Wilfried Happio	49.97	Edgar Levard	51.46 PB	Rayan Duperme	51.67 PB
3000 m s'chase	Djilali Bedrani	8:35.39	Mehdi Belhadj	8:40.89	Louis Gilavert	8:41.27
10,000 m walk	Gabriel Bordier	39:17 PB	David Kuster	42:01	Dimitri Durand	42:26 PB
High jump	Sébastien Micheau	2.18 m	Raphael Moudoulou	2.15 m PB	Dorian Tharaud	2.12 m
Pole vault	Renaud Lavillenie	5.80 m	Valentin Lavillenie	5.70 m	Ethan Cormont	5.58 m
Long jump	Yann Randrianasolo	7.91 m	Al-Assane Fofana	7.83 m PB	Tom Campagne	7.80 m
Triple jump	Jean-Marc Pontvianne	16.85 m	Enzo Hodebar	16.72 m PB	Benjamin Compaoré	16.38 m
Shot put	Frédéric Dagée	19.74 m	Antoine Duponchel	18.02 m	Yann Moisan	17.79 m
Discus throw	Lolassonn Djouhan	60.07 m	Tom Reux	56.23 m	Dean-Nick Allen	53.00 m
Hammer throw	Quentin Bigot	76.42 m	Yann Chaussinand	73.61 m PB	Enguerrand Decroix Têtu	69.83 m
Javelin throw	Lukas Moutarde	75.71 m	Teuraiterai Tupaia	73.07 m PB	Rémi Conroy	71.76 m
Decathlon	Axel Hubert	8260 pts WL PB	Ruben Gado	7738 pts	Théo Rouai	7313 pts

=== Women ===
Event	Gold		Silver		Bronze	
100 metres	Carolle Zahi	11.28	Wided Atatou	11.38 PB	Jessie Saint-Marc	11.46 PB
200 metres	Carolle Zahi	22.98	Wided Atatou	23.12 PB	Maroussia Paré	23.50
400 metres	Sokhna Lacoste	52.48 PB	Amandine Brossier	52.66	Diana Iscaye	52.93
800 metres	Noélie Yarigo	2:04.76	Cynthia Anaïs	2:05.28	Léna Kandissounon	2:05.30
1500 metres	Bérénice Fulchiron	4:23.66	Bérénice Cleyet-Merle	4:24.02	Marine Houel	4:24.97
5000 metres	Alessia Zarbo	15:56.46	Aude Korotchansky	15:58.58 PB	Emeline Delanis	16:02.54 PB
100 m hurdles	Cyréna Samba-Mayela	12.73 PB	Solenn Compper	13.20	Fanny Quenot	13.36
400 m hurdles	Farah Clerc	57.91	Shana Grebo	58.00	Meriem Sahnoune	58.32 PB
3000 m s'chase	Alice Finot	10:01.58	Flavie Renouard	10:02.39	Claire Palou	10:02.54
10,000 m walk	Eloïse Terrec	45:35 PB	Émilie Menuet	46:55	Camille Moutard	47:28 PB
High jump	Solène Gicquel	1.87 m	Claire Orcel	1.87 m	Léonie Cambours	1.83 m
Pole vault	Marion Lotout	4.55 m	Margot Chevrier	4.30 m	Mallaury Sautereau	4.20 m
Long jump	Éloyse Lesueur-Aymonin	6.44 m	Yanis David	6.35 m	Rougui Sow	6.28 m
Triple jump	Jeanine Assani Issouf	13.59 m	Ilionis Guillaume	13.55 m	Sohane Aucagos	13.34 m PB
Shot put	Amanda Ngandu-Ntumba	16.01 m PB	Caroline Métayer	15.02 m	Alexandra Aubry	13.83 m
Discus throw	Mélina Robert-Michon	60.06 m	Irène Donzelot	54.74 m	Amanda Ngandu-Ntumba	52.59 m
Hammer throw	Alexandra Tavernier	72.76 m	Lorelei Taillandier	64.32 m PB	Rose Loga	63.98 m
Javelin throw	Alexie Alaïs	58.11 m	Jona Aigouy	56.09 m PB	Evelina Mendes	54.10 m
Heptathlon	Cassandre Aguessy-Thomas	5542 pts WL PB	Célia Perron	5421 pts	Sabrina Gros	4912 pts
