= 2017 French Indoor Athletics Championships =

- Dates: 18–19 February
- Host city: Bordeaux
- Venue: Vélodrome de Bordeaux
- Events: 28

The 2017 French Indoor Athletics Championships was the 46th edition of the national championship in indoor track and field for France, organised by the French Athletics Federation. It was held on 18–19 February at the Vélodrome de Bordeaux in Bordeaux. A total of 28 events (divided evenly between the sexes) were contested over the two-day competition.

== Results ==
=== Men ===
Event	Gold		Silver		Bronze	
60 metres	Christophe Lemaitre	6.60	Ben Bassaw	6.79	Méba-Mickaël Zeze	6.81
200 metres	Jeffrey John	21.33	Alan Alais	21.78	Ismael Diop	21.98
400 metres	Thomas Jordier	47.56	Azir Inoussa	47.89	Nicolas Courbière	47.91
800 metres	Clément Dhainaut	1:50.37	Paul Renaudie	1:50.60	Benjamin Robert	1:52.24
1500 metres	Sofiane Selmouni	3:55.04	Samir Dahmani	3:55.20	Alexandre Saddedine	3:56.90
3000 metres	Yann Schrub	8:16.79	Florian Arnould	8:18.41	Julien Samson	8:18.49
5000 m walk	Yohann Diniz	19:14.41	Jean Blancheteau	19:14.41	Damien Molmy	20:29.79
60 m hurdles	Pascal Martinot-Lagarde	7.52	Aurel Manga	7.53	Wilhem Belocian	7.73
High jump	Abdoulaye Diarra	2.22 m	Matthieu Tomassi	2.19 m	Florian Labourel	2.15 m
Pole vault	Kévin Menaldo	5.78 m	Stanley Joseph	5.50 m	Jérôme Clavier	5.35 m
Long jump	Kafétien Gomis	7.84 m	Cédric Dufag	7.61 m	Augustin Bey	7.52 m
Triple jump	Jean-Marc Pontvianne	17.13 m	Kévin Luron	16.72 m	Benjamin Compaoré	16.62 m
Shot put	Frédéric Dagée	19.66 m	Romain Gotteland	17.90 m	Stéphane Szuster	17.16 m
Heptathlon	Maxime Maugein	5902 pts	Jérémy Lelièvre	5858 pts	Florian Geffrouais	5833 pts

=== Women ===
Event	Gold		Silver		Bronze	
60 metres	Floriane Gnafoua	7.21	Stella Akakpo	7.33	Orlann Ombissa-Dzangue	7.37
200 metres	Maroussia Paré	23.71	Solenn Compper	24.36	Hélène Parisot	24.74
400 metres	Agnès Raharolahy	:52.97	Estelle Perrossier	:53.52	Louise-Anne Bertheau	:54.55
800 metres	Imane Boukharta	2:09.19	Charlotte Mouchet	2:09.39	Lore Hoffmann	2:10.74
1500 metres	Élodie Normand	4:22.94	Manon Fage	4:25.75	Élodie Mathien	4:26.24
3000 metres	Élodie Normand	9:23.76	Lucie Lerebourg	9:25.76	Ophélie Claude-Boxberger	9:33.34
3000 m walk	Émilie Menuet	12:38.31	Clémence Beretta	12:57.30	Marine Quennehen	13:13.78
60 m hurdles	Sandra Sogoyou	8.15	Laura Valette	8.15	Antoinette Nana Djimou	8.22
High jump	Marine Vallet	1.86 m	Prisca Duvernay	1.84 m	Solène Gicquel	1.82 m
Pole vault	Maria Leonor Tavares	4.35 m	Ninon Guillon-Romarin	4.30 m	Marion Lotout	4.30 m
Long jump	Haoua Kessely	6.32 m	Angelica Berriot	6.19 m	Mona Crinière	6.12 m
Triple jump	Jeanine Assani Issouf	13.92 m	Rouguy Diallo	13.20 m	Amy Zongo-Filet	13.20 m
Shot put	Jessica Cérival	17.62 m	Antoinette Nana Djimou	15.17 m	Caroline Metayer	14.94 m
Pentathlon	Laura Arteil	4180 pts	Esther Turpin	4160 pts	Sandra Jacmaire	4119 pts
