= 2011 French Athletics Championships =

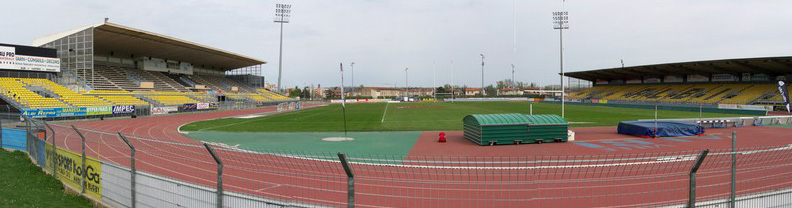
- The host stadium
- Dates: 28–30 July
- Host city: Albi
- Venue: Stadium Municipal d'Albi
- Events: 38

The 2011 French Athletics Championships was the 123rd edition of the national championship in outdoor track and field for France. It was held on 28–30 July at the Stadium Municipal d'Albi in Albi. A total of 38 events (divided evenly between the sexes) were contested over the three-day competition. Christophe Lemaitre broke the French record in the men's 100 metres with a time of 9.92 seconds.

== Results ==
=== Men ===
Event	Gold		Silver		Bronze	
100 metres	Christophe Lemaitre	9.92 NR	Jimmy Vicaut	10.07 PB	Martial Mbandjock	10.17
200 metres	Christophe Lemaitre	20.08	Martial Mbandjock	20.59	Teddy Tinmar	20.62
400 metres	Yannick Fonsat	46.00	Teddy Venel	46.15	Nicolas Fillon	46.16
800 metres	Jeff Lastennet	1:50.03	Pierre-Ambroise Bosse	1:50.25	Brice Panel	1:50.50
1500 metres	Florian Carvalho	3:54.35	Yohan Durand	3:54.59	Jamale Aarrass	3:54.63
5000 metres	Hassan Hirt	13:58.11	Denis Mayaud	13:59.38	Stéphane Lefrand	14:01.63
10,000 m walk	Yohann Diniz	38:44.97	Kévin Campion	40:14.14	Cédric Houssaye	40:59.97
110 m hurdles	Dimitri Bascou	13.26	Bano Traoré	13.68	Thomas Delmestre	13.74
400 m hurdles	Adrien Clemenceau	50.15	Héni Kechi	50.19	Hugo Grillas	50.22
3000 m s'chase	Bouabdellah Tahri	8:34.29	Vincent Zouaoui-Dandrieux	8:35.34	Noureddine Gezzar	8:37.96
4 × 100 m relay	Athlétique sport aixois Manuel Reynaert; Christophe Lemaitre; Pierre-Alexis Pessonneaux; Ryan Aifa	39.55	ES Montgeron	40.60	Grand Angoulême Athlétisme	40.77
High jump	Mickaël Hanany	2.26 m	Fabrice Saint-Jean	2.22 m	Mathias Cianci	2.22 m
Pole vault	Romain Mesnil	5.73 m	Jérôme Clavier	5.53 m	Damiel Dossévi	5.53 m
Long jump	Kafétien Gomis	8.22 m w (+4.0 m/s)	Salim Sdiri	8.13 m w (+3.7 m/s)	Benoit Maxwell	8.06 m w (+3.8 m/s)
Triple jump	Karl Taillepierre	17.01 m	Gaëtan Saku Bafuanda	16.82 m	Colomba Fofana	16.76 m
Shot put	Gaëtan Bucki	19.53 m	Tumatai Dauphin	19.19 m	Frédéric Dagée	17.92 m
Discus throw	Jean-François Aurokiom	59.04 m	Stéphane Marthely	58.01 m	Lolassonn Djouhan	57.66 m
Hammer throw	Frederick Pouzy	74.31 m	Jérôme Bortoluzzi	73.63 m	Quentin Bigot	71.79 m
Javelin throw	Laurent Dorique	72.98 m	Jérôme Haeffler	72.72 m	Jean-Baptiste Arnaud	72.06 m
Decathlon	Romain Barras	8117 pts	Florian Geffrouais	7932 pts	Jérémy Lelièvre	7444 pts

=== Women ===
Event	Gold		Silver		Bronze	
100 metres	Véronique Mang	11.11	Myriam Soumaré	11.17	Carima Louami	11.28
200 metres	Myriam Soumaré	22.86	Lina Jacques-Sébastien	22.99	Johanna Danois	23.00
400 metres	Elea-Mariama Diarra	53.01	Marie Gayot	53.04	Muriel Hurtis	53.40
800 metres	Clarisse Moh	2:03.61	Fanjanteino Félix	2:03.67	Jennifer Lozano	2:03.79
1500 metres	Hind Dehiba	4:08.17	Fanjanteino Félix	4:19.87	Jennifer Lozano	4:21.39
5000 metres	Christelle Daunay	16:03.64	Clémence Calvin	16:10.27	Christine Bardelle	16:27.22
10,000 m walk	Sylwia Korzeniowska	46:21.67	Christine Guinaudeau	46:45.47	Émilie Menuet	49:17.14
100 m hurdles	Sandra Gomis	12.93	Cindy Billaud	13.05	Adrianna Lamalle	13.07
400 m hurdles	Phara Anacharsis	57.61	Sylvaine Derycke	58.37	Cécile Bernaleau	58.80
3000 m s'chase	Sophie Duarte	10:00.70	Élodie Olivarès	10:07.35	Hassna Taboussi	10:20.33
4 × 100 m relay	AC Paris-Joinville	46.62	EA Cergy-Pontoise athlétisme	46.70	Grand Angoulême athlétisme	47.10
High jump	Melanie Melfort	1.89 m	Nina Manga	1.80 m	Sandrine Champion Lucie Morand	1.77 m
Pole vault	Maria Ribeiro-Tavares	4.50 m	Marion Lotout	4.50 m	Télie Mathiot	4.30 m
Long jump	Éloyse Lesueur	6.62 m	Élysée Vesanes	6.52 m	Antoinette Nana Djimou	6.47 m
Triple jump	Nathalie Marie-Nely	14.18 m	Amy Zongo-Filet	13.77 m	Vanessa Gladone	13.70 m
Shot put	Jessica Cérival	16.92 m	Marie-Patrice Calabre	14.87 m	Coralie Glatre	14.64 m
Discus throw	Mélina Robert-Michon	57.37 m	Irène Donzelot	54.93 m	Christelle Bornil	53.02 m
Hammer throw	Manuela Montebrun	69.06 m	Jessika Guehaseim	67.42 m	Stéphanie Falzon	67.04 m
Javelin throw	Nadia Vigliano	55.59 m	Sephora Bissoly	55.00 m	Alexia Kogut-Kubiak	54.87 m
Heptathlon	Blandine Maisonnier	5870 pts	Gabriela Kouassi	5706 pts	Aurélie Chaboudez	5660 pts
