= 2022 French Athletics Championships =

- Edition: 134th
- Dates: 24–26 June
- Host city: Caen
- Venue: Stade Hélitas
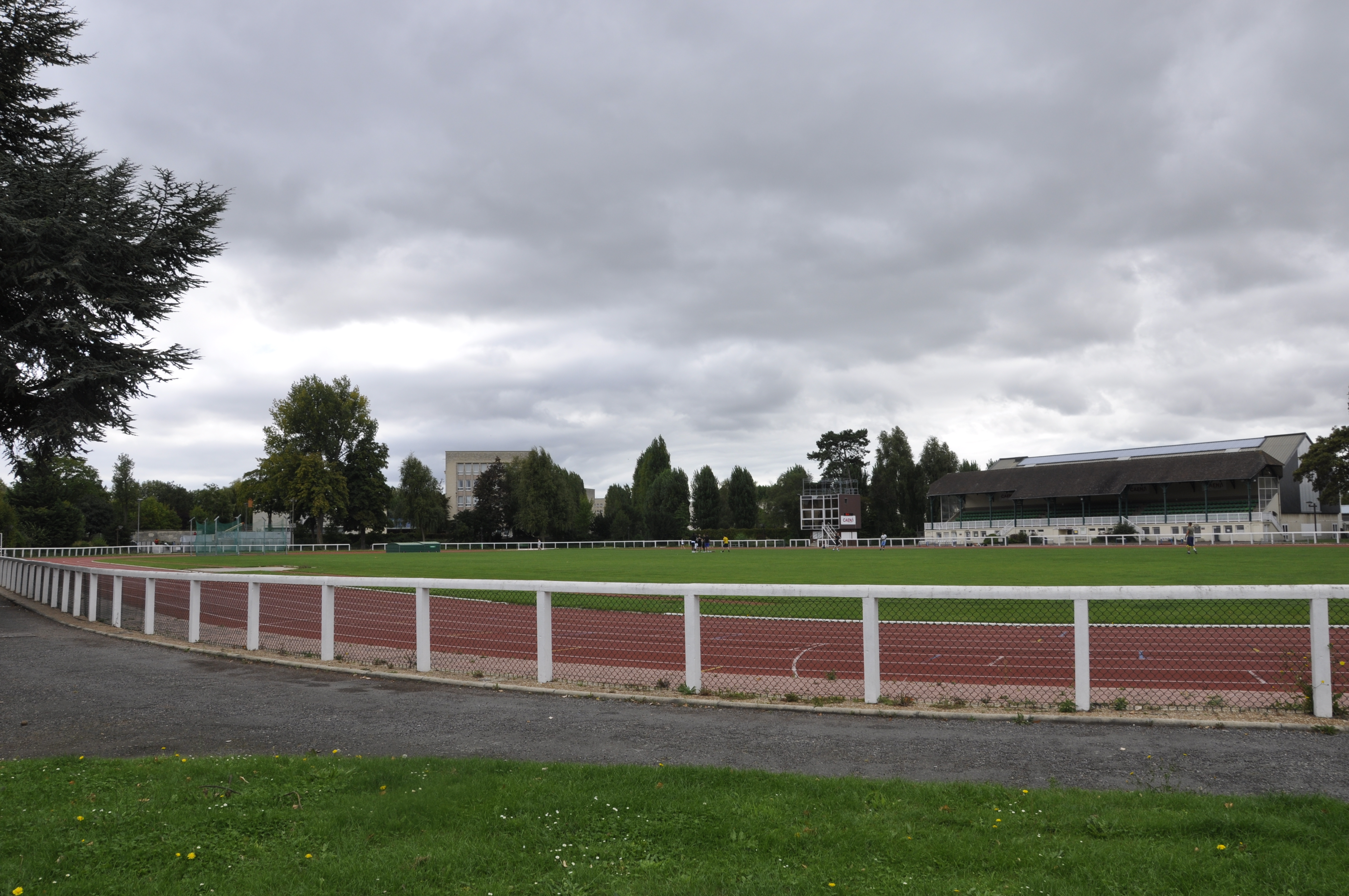
- Events: 38

The 2022 French Athletics Championships was the 134th edition of the national championship in outdoor track and field for France. It was held on 24–26 June at Stade Hélitas in Caen. A total of 38 events (divided evenly between the sexes) were contested over the three-day competition.

== Programme ==
Finals	24 June	25 June	26 June
Men	Discus throw, Hammer throw, 5000 m, decathlon	High jump, triple jump, 800 m, decathlon, 100 m, 400 m hurdles, 110 m hurdles	10,000 m walk, javelin throw, shot put, pole vault, long jump, 400 m, 3000 m steeple, 200 m, 1500 m
Women	Hammer throw, 5000 m, heptathlon	Long jump, javelin throw, shot put, 3000 m steeple, pole vault, heptathlon, 400 m, 100 m, 1500 m, 800 m	10,000 m walk, triple jump, high jump, discus throw, 800 m, 400 m hurdles, 200 m, 100 m hurdles

== Results ==
=== Men ===
Event	Gold		Silver		Bronze	
100 metres	Mouhamadou Fall	10.19	Méba-Mickaël Zeze	10.20	Jimmy Vicaut	10.24
200 metres	Méba-Mickaël Zeze	20.41 PB	Ryan Zeze	20.46 PB	Mouhamadou Fall	20.50
400 metres	Thomas Jordier	45.71	Téo Andant	45.99 PB	Simon Boypa	46.01 PB
800 metres	Benjamin Robert	1:48.58	Gabriel Tual	1:48.89	Pierre-Ambroise Bosse	1:49.17
1500 metres	Azeddine Habz	3:40.25	Alexis Miellet	3:40.40	Romain Mornet	3:40.50
5000 metres	Hugo Hay	13:54.04	Félix Bour	13:54.33	Fabien Palcau	13:55.49
100 m hurdles	Sasha Zhoya	13.17 PB	Aurel Manga	13.41	Just Kwaou-Mathey	13.51
400 m hurdles	Wilfried Happio	48.57 PB	Ludvy Vaillant	49.74	Victor Coroller	50.04
3000 m s'chase	Mehdi Belhadj	8:24.25	Louis Gilavert	8:24.82	Djilali Bedrani	8:26.18
10,000 m walk	Gabriel Bordier	38:18.55 PB	Aurélien Quinion	39:28.56 PB	Kévin Campion	39:54.30
High jump	Nathan Ismar	2.19 m	Sébastien Micheau	2.16 m	Kristen Biyengui	2.16 m
Pole vault	Thibaut Collet	5.75 m	Renaud Lavillenie	5.75 m	Anthony Ammirati	5.70 m
Long jump	Jules Pommery	7.86 m	Augustin Bey	7.75 m	Jean-Pierre Bertrand	7.74 m
Triple jump	Enzo Hodebar	17.05 m PB	Jean-Marc Pontvianne	17.04 m	Melvin Raffin	16.94 m
Shot put	Frédéric Dagée	19.58 m	Yann Moisan	18.16 m	Stephen Mailagi	18.01 m
Discus throw	Lolassonn Djouhan	60.04 m	Tom Reux	58.71 m	Willy Vicaut	56.86 m PB
Hammer throw	Quentin Bigot	78.15 m	Jean-Baptiste Bruxelle	72.70 m	Earwyn Abdou	68.53 m
Javelin throw	Felise Vahai Sosaia	77.02 m PB	Lukas Moutarde	74.64 m	Rémi Conroy	72.10 m
Decathlon	Baptiste Thiery	7966 pts PB	Arthur Prevost	7774 pts PB	Jérémy Lelièvre	7495 pts

=== Women ===
Event	Gold		Silver		Bronze	
100 metres	Mallory Leconte	11.43	Leelou Martial-Ehoulet	11.54	Floriane Gnafoua	11.62
200 metres	Shana Grebo	22.98 PB	Paméra Losange	23.23 PB	Brigitte Ntiamoah	23.32
400 metres	Amandine Brossier	52.02	Shana Grebo	52.42	Sounkamba Sylla	52.87
800 metres	Rénelle Lamote	1:58.71	Agnès Raharolahy	1:59.59 PB	Cynthia Anaïs	2:01.33
1500 metres	Charlotte Mouchet	4:20.58	Anaïs Bourgoin	4:20.60	Aurore Fleury	4:21.21
5000 metres	Manon Trapp	15:48.79	Leila Hadji	15:54.08	Méline Rollin	15:55.11
110 m hurdles	Laura Valette	12.99	Awa Sene	13.06 PB	Solenn Compper	13.06
400 m hurdles	Camille Séri	56.50	Emma Montoya	58.72	Farah Clerc	59.33
3000 m s'chase	Alice Finot	9:48.00	Flavie Renouard	9:53.52	Alexa Lemitre	9:57.94
10,000 m walk	Clémence Beretta	44:08.73 NR PB	Eloïse Terrec	44:38.72 PB	Laury Cerantola	47:20.98 PB
High jump	Solène Gicquel	1.85 m	Nawal Meniker	1.82 m	Fatoumata Balley	1.79 m
Pole vault	Margot Chevrier	4.50 m	Marie-Julie Bonnin	4.50 m PB	Elina Giallurachis	4.40 m
Long jump	Yanis David	6.80 m	Maelly Dalmat	6.44 m	Rougui Sow	6.41 m
Triple jump	Victoria Josse	13.49 m	Sohane Aucagos	13.19 m	Maeva Dorsile	13.06 m
Shot put	Amanda Ngandu-Ntumba	15.44 m	Naomie Wuta	15.32 m PB	Rose Sharon Pierre-Louis	14.94 m
Discus throw	Mélina Robert-Michon	58.82 m	Amanda Ngandu-Ntumba	55.55 m	Pauline Pousse	54.48 m
Hammer throw	Alexandra Tavernier	68.34 m	Xena Ngomateke	65.23 m	Rose Loga	63.74 m
Javelin throw	Alizée Minard	57.17 m	Margaux Nicollin	54.05 m	Evelina Mendes	51.90 m
Heptathlon	Léonie Cambours	6046 pts	Esther Turpin	5951 pts	Elisa Pineau	5854 pts PB
