= 2018 French Indoor Athletics Championships =

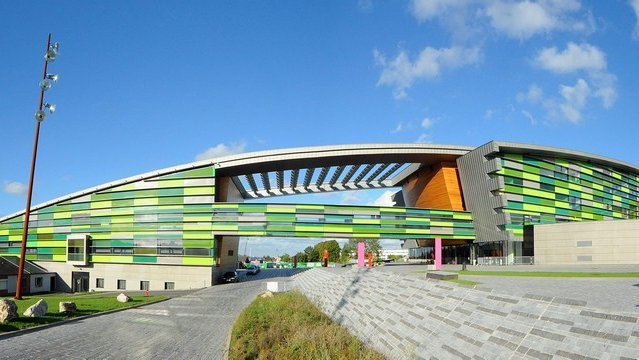
- The host stadium
- Dates: 17–18 February
- Host city: Liévin
- Venue: Arena Stade Couvert de Liévin
- Events: 28

The 2018 French Indoor Athletics Championships was the 47th edition of the national championship in indoor track and field for France, organised by the French Athletics Federation. It was held on 17–18 February at the Arena Stade Couvert de Liévin in Liévin. A total of 28 events (divided evenly between the sexes) were contested over the two-day competition.

== Results ==
=== Men ===
Event	Gold		Silver		Bronze	
60 metres	Marvin René	6.65	Méba-Mickaël Zeze	6.68	Amaury Golitin	6.69
200 metres	Méba-Mickaël Zeze	20.65	Ilies Tano	21.34	Ismael Bedel	21.47
400 metres	Thomas Jordier	46.85	Victor Coroller	47.51	Muhammad Kounta	47.55
800 metres	Clément Dhainaut	1:50.99	Valentin Robert	1:51.11	Thibaut Dambricourt	1:51.17
1500 metres	Samir Dahmani	3:46.12	Quentin Tison	3:47.14	Yann Schrub	3:48.65
3000 metres	Simon Denissel	7:54.85	Guillaume Adam	8:07.68	Mehdi Frère	8:08.77
5000 m walk	David Kuster	19:46.73	Fabien Bernabé	20:12.26	Kenny Guinaudeau	20:17.44
60 m hurdles	Aurel Manga	7.53	Pascal Martinot-Lagarde	7.54	Simon Krauss	7.72
High jump	Youssef Benzamia	2.18 m	Abdoulaye Diarra	2.14 m	Quentin Pladys	2.10 m
Pole vault	Renaud Lavillenie	5.83 m	Valentin Lavillenie	5.72 m	Kévin Menaldo	5.72 m
Long jump	Guillaume Victorin	7.65 m	Jonathan Drack	7.57 m	Jean-Pierre Bertrand	7.56 m
Triple jump	Martin Lamou	16.89 m	Kévin Luron	16.50 m	Benjamin Compaoré	16.39 m
Shot put	Gaëtan Bucki	18.80 m	Willy Vicaut	18.09 m	Romain Gotteland	17.95 m
Heptathlon	Maxence Pécatte	5864 pts	Bastien Auzeil	5810 pts	Gaël Querin	5713 pts

=== Women ===
Event	Gold		Silver		Bronze	
60 metres	Carolle Zahi	7.17	Orlann Ombissa-Dzangue	7.26	Estelle Raffai	7.42
200 metres	Amandine Brossier	23.44	Jennifer Galais	23.57	Brigitte Ntiamoah	23.60
400 metres	Déborah Sananes	52.83	Kellya Pauline	52.89	Marine Mignon	53.97
800 metres	Cynthia Anaïs	2:04.43	Charlotte Pizzo	2:09.33	Anaïs Seiller	2:09.80
1500 metres	Élodie Normand	4:18.00	Ophélie Claude-Boxberger	4:18.13	Lucie Lerebourg	4:26.14
3000 metres	Claire Perraux	9:15.22	Fanny Pruvost	9:27.34	Mélanie Doutart	9:29.40
3000 m walk	Marine Quennehen	13:21.68	Maud Delhors	13:42.60	Amélie Bourhis	13:48.45
60 m hurdles	Laura Valette	8.14	Fanny Quenot	8.22	Karel Zyketh	8.23
High jump	Marine Vallet	1.87 m	Solène Gicquel	1.85 m	Coralie Arcuby	1.83 m
Pole vault	Ninon Guillon-Romarin	4.60 m	Mallaury Sautereau	4.31 m	Marion Fiack-Sidéa Solène Guiloineau Jade Vigneron	4.21 m
Long jump	Éloyse Lesueur	6.69 m	Antoinette Nana Djimou	6.16 m	Charlotte Pierre	5.96 m
Triple jump	Ilionis Guillaume	14.07 m	Jeanine Assani-Issouf	14.06 m	Sokhna Gallé	13.36 m
Shot put	Jessica Cérival	16.47 m	Rose-Sharon Pierre-Louis	16.14 m	Antoinette Nana Djimou	15.42 m
Pentathlon	Esther Turpin	4364 pts	Solène Ndama	4272 pts	Anaelle Nyabeu Djapa	4208 pts
