= French Athletics Championships =

Annual track and field competition

- Sport: Track and field
- Founded: 1888
- Country: France

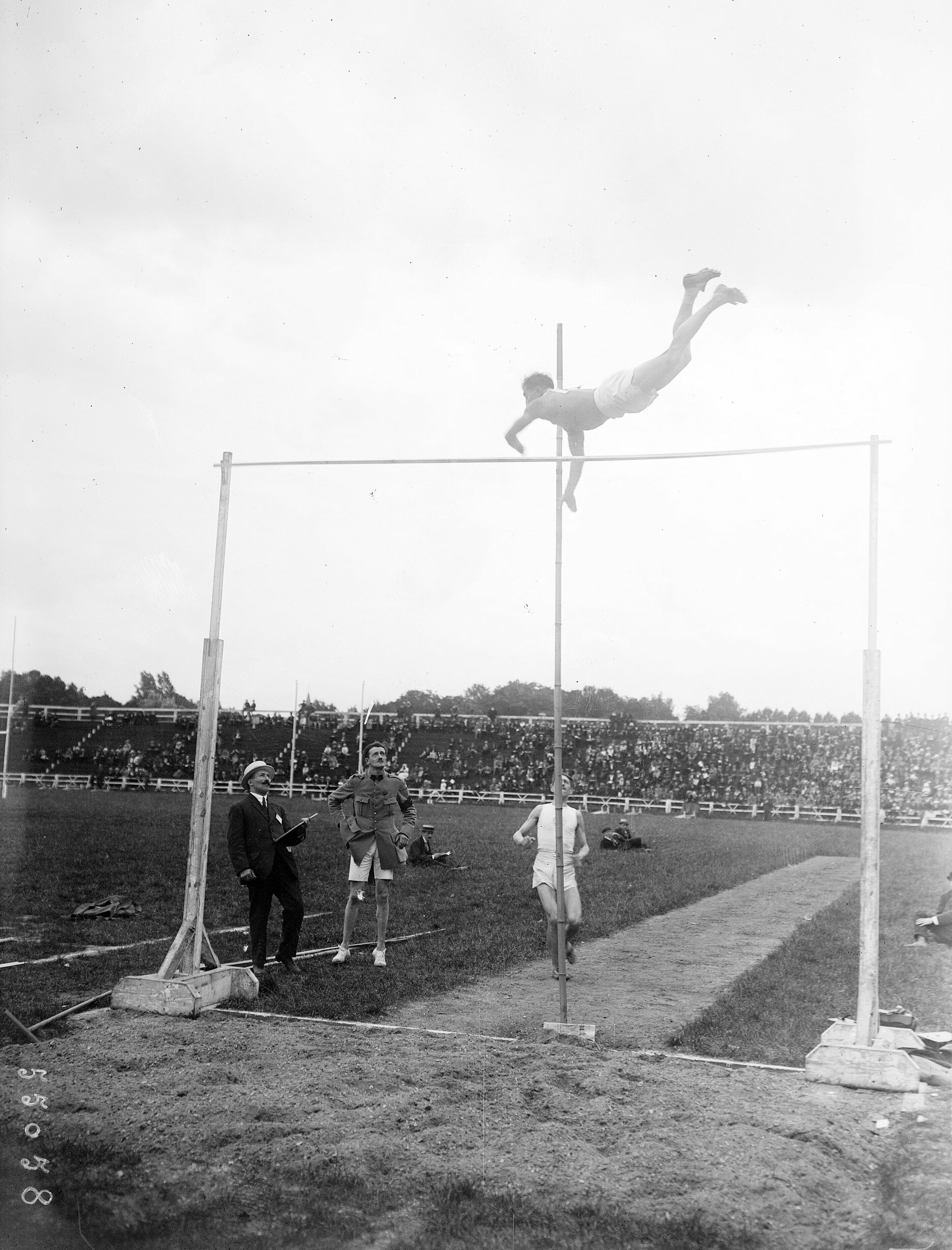
The pole vault at the 1919 French Championships

The French Athletics Championships (French: Championnats de France d'athlétisme) is an annual outdoor track and field competition organised by the Fédération française d'athlétisme (FFA; French Athletics Federation), which serves as the French national championships for the sport. The three-day event is typically held in early or mid-summer and the venue varies on an annual basis. It is open to adults of all ages and is thus referred to as the senior or élite championships.

The championships were first held in 1888 and were organised by the Union des Sociétés Françaises de Sports Athlétiques (USFSA; Union of French Athletics Sports Societies). The USFSA declined in favour of specialised national sports bodies early in the 20th century and FFA has organised the championships since 1921. The championships have been held every year since their inauguration with the exception of four inter-war years: 1915, 1916, 1940, and 1944.

== Events ==
On the current programme a total of 38 individual French Championship athletics events are contested, divided evenly between men and women. For each of the sexes, there are six track running events, three obstacle events, four jumps, four throws, a racewalk and a combined track and field event.

Track running

- 100 metres, 200 metres, 400 metres, 800 metres, 1500 metres, 5000 metres

Obstacle events

- 100 metres hurdles (women only), 110 metres hurdles (men only), 400 metres hurdles, 3000 metres steeplechase

Jumping events

- Pole vault, high jump, long jump, triple jump

Throwing events

- Shot put, discus throw, javelin throw, hammer throw

Walking events

- 5000 metres race walk

Combined events

- Decathlon (men only), heptathlon (women only)

In addition to the individual championship events, clubs are entered into team championship events which include relays over four distances:

- 4 × 100 metres relay, 4 × 200 metres relay, 4 × 400 metres relay and 4 × 1500 metres relay.

Until 1995, the long-distance women's event was over 3000 metres. This was matched to the men's distance of 5000 m in line with changes in the Olympic programme. Though fewer events were initially on offer in the women's track and field programme for the French championships, this was gradually expanded, with the 1500 m being introduced in 1969, the 3000 m in 1972, the 400 m hurdles in 1976, the triple jump in 1990, the hammer throw in 1994, and the pole vault in 1995. The introduction of a women's 3000 m steeplechase in 2000 finally brought the men's and women's programmes to parity.

Separate championship events are held for the 10,000 metres, road running and walks, and cross country running.

== Editions ==
Year	Date	Venue	Stadium
Organised by the USFSA
1888	29 April	Paris	Croix-Catelan
1889	30 June	Paris	Croix-Catelan
1890	18 May	Paris	Tuileries
1891	3 May	Paris	Croix-Catelan
1892	22 May	Paris	Croix-Catelan
1893	21 & 28 May	Paris	Croix-Catelan
1894	27 May	Paris	Croix-Catelan
1895	26 May	Paris	Croix-Catelan
1896	28 June	Paris	Croix-Catelan
1897	27 June	Paris	Croix-Catelan
1898	26 June	Paris	Croix-Catelan
1899	18 June	Paris	Croix-Catelan
1900	17 June	Paris	Croix-Catelan
1901	23 June	Paris	Croix-Catelan
1902	22 June	Paris	Croix-Catelan
1903	28 June	Paris	Croix-Catelan
1904	26 June	Paris	Croix-Catelan
1905	18 June	Paris	Croix-Catelan
1906	1 July	Paris	Parc de Saint Cloud
1907	30 June	Paris	Croix-Catelan
1908	5 July	Paris	Parc de Saint Cloud
1909	27 June	Colombes	
1910	26 June	Paris	Croix-Catelan
1911	18 June	Colombes	
1912	16 June	Colombes	
1913	22 June	Colombes	
1914	21 June	Colombes	
1915	Not held		
1916	Not held		
1917	24 June	Paris	Croix-Catelan
1918	30 June	Saint-Cloud	
1919	20 July	Colombes	
1920	17–18 July	Paris	Stade Pershing
Organised by the FFA
1921	10-11 July	Colombes	Stade Olympique Yves-du-Manoir
1922	16-17 July	Colombes	Stade Olympique Yves-du-Manoir
1923	14-15 July	Paris	Stade Pershing
1924	21-22 June	Colombes	Stade Olympique Yves-du-Manoir
1925	4-5 July	Colombes	Stade Olympique Yves-du-Manoir
1926	10-11 July	Colombes	Stade Olympique Yves-du-Manoir
1927	6-7 August	Colombes	Stade Olympique Yves-du-Manoir
1928	14-15 July	Colombes	Stade Olympique Yves-du-Manoir
1929	6-7 July	Colombes	Stade Olympique Yves-du-Manoir
1930	19-20 July	Colombes	Stade Olympique Yves-du-Manoir
1931	18–19 July	Colombes	Stade Olympique Yves-du-Manoir
1932	25-26 June	Colombes	Stade Olympique Yves-du-Manoir
1933	15–16 July	Colombes	Stade Olympique Yves-du-Manoir
1934	7–8 July	Colombes	Stade Olympique Yves-du-Manoir
1935	6-7 July	Colombes	Stade Olympique Yves-du-Manoir
1936	11–12 July	Colombes	Stade Olympique Yves-du-Manoir
1937	10–11 July	Colombes	Stade Olympique Yves-du-Manoir
1938	23-24 July	Colombes	Stade Olympique Yves-du-Manoir
1939	22–23 July	Colombes	Stade Olympique Yves-du-Manoir
1940	Not held		
1941	19-20 July	Colombes	Stade Olympique Yves-du-Manoir
1942	25-26 July	Bordeaux	Stade municipal
1943	24-25 July	Lyon	Stade municipal
1944	Not held		
1945	28-29 July	Bordeaux	Stade municipal
1946	20-21 July	Colombes	Stade Olympique Yves-du-Manoir
1947	2-3 August	Colombes	Stade Olympique Yves-du-Manoir
1948	10–11 July	Colombes	Stade Olympique Yves-du-Manoir
1949	9-10 July	Colombes	Stade Olympique Yves-du-Manoir
1950	22-23 July	Colombes	Stade Jean Bouin
1951	21-22 July	Colombes	Stade Jean Bouin
1952	28-29 June	Colombes	Stade Olympique Yves-du-Manoir
1953	18-19 July	Colombes	Stade Olympique Yves-du-Manoir
1954	7-8 August	Colombes	Stade Olympique Yves-du-Manoir
1955	6-7 August	Colombes	Stade Olympique Yves-du-Manoir
1956	4-5 August	Colombes	Stade Olympique Yves-du-Manoir
1957	14–15 September	Colombes	Stade Olympique Yves-du-Manoir
1958	26-27 July	Colombes	Stade Olympique Yves-du-Manoir
1959	25-26 July	Colombes	Stade Olympique Yves-du-Manoir
1960	23-24 July	Colombes	Stade Olympique Yves-du-Manoir
1961	22-23 July	Colombes	Stade Olympique Yves-du-Manoir
1962	28–29 July	Colombes	Stade Olympique Yves-du-Manoir
1963	27-28 July	Colombes	Stade Olympique Yves-du-Manoir
1964	24-25 July	Colombes	Stade Olympique Yves-du-Manoir
1965	24-25 July	Colombes	Stade Olympique Yves-du-Manoir
1966	23-24 July	Colombes	Stade Olympique Yves-du-Manoir
1967	29-30 July	Colombes	Stade Jean Bouin
1968	27–28 July	Colombes	Stade Olympique Yves-du-Manoir
1969	18-20 July	Colombes	Stade Olympique Yves-du-Manoir
1970	17-19 July	Colombes	Stade Olympique Yves-du-Manoir
1971	23-25 July	Colombes	Stade Olympique Yves-du-Manoir
1972	21-23 July	Colombes	Stade Olympique Yves-du-Manoir
1973	20-22 July	Colombes	Stade Olympique Yves-du-Manoir
1974	26-28 July	Nice	
1975	27–29 June	Saint-Étienne	
1976	25–27 June	Villeneuve-d'Ascq	Stadium Lille Métropole
1977	22–24 July	Nevers	
1978	21–23 July	Paris	Stade Sébastien Charléty
1979	10-12 August	Orléans	
1980	27-29 June	Villeneuve-d'Ascq	Stadium Lille Métropole
1981	17–19 July	Mulhouse	
1982	6-8 August	Colombes	Stade Olympique Yves-du-Manoir
1983	22-24 July	Bordeaux	
1984	29 June-1 July	Villeneuve-d'Ascq	Stadium Lille Métropole
1985	19–21 July	Colombes	Stade Olympique Yves-du-Manoir
1986	8-10 August	Aix-les-Bains	
1987	7-9 August	Annecy	Parc des Sports
1988	11-13 August	Tours	
1989	12-14 August	Tours	
1990	27-29 July	Blois	
1991	26-28 July	Dijon	
1992	26-28 June	Narbonne	Parc des Sports Et de l'Amitié
1993	23-25 July	Annecy	Parc des sports
1994	22-24 July	Annecy	Parc des sports
1995	21-23 July	Paris	Stade Sébastien Charléty
1996	21-23 June	Bondoufle	Stade Robert Bobin
1997	4-6 July	Fort-de-France	Stade Pierre-Aliker
1998	3–5 July	Dijon	
1999	30 July-1 August	Niort	Stade René Gaillard
2000	4-6 August	Nice	Stade Charles-Ehrmann
2001	1–3 July	Saint-Étienne	Stade Henri-Lux
2002	13–15 July	Saint-Étienne	Stade Henri-Lux
2003	24–26 July	Narbonne	Parc des Sports Et de l'Amitié
2004	16–18 July	Sotteville-lès-Rouen	Jean-Adret Stadium
2005	14–16 July	Angers	Stade du Lac de Maine
2006	20–22 July	Tomblaine	Stade Raymond-Petit
2007	3–5 August	Niort	Stade René Gaillard
2008	24–26 July	Albi	Stadium Municipal d'Albi
2009	23–25 July	Angers	Lac de Maine Stadium
2010	3–4 July	Valence, Drôme	Stade Georges Pompidou
2011	28–30 July	Albi	Stadium Municipal d'Albi
2012	15–17 June	Angers	Stade du Lac de Maine
2013	12–14 July	Paris	Stade Sébastien Charléty
2014	11–13 July	Reims	Stade Georges Hebert
2015	10–12 July	Villeneuve-d'Ascq	Stadium Lille Métropole
2016	24–26 June	Angers	Stade du Lac de Maine
2017	14–16 July	Marseille	Stade Delort
2018	6–8 July	Albi	Stadium Municipal d'Albi
2019	26–28 July	Saint-Étienne	Stade Henri-Lux
2020	12–13 September	Albi	Stadium Municipal d'Albi
2021	25–27 June	Angers	Stade du Lac de Maine
2022	24–26 June	Caen	Stade Hélitas
2023	28–30 July	Albi	Stadium Municipal d'Albi
2024	29–30 June	Angers	Stade Josette et Roger Mikulak
2025	1–3 August	Talence	Stade Pierre Paul Bernard
2026	24–26 July	Albi	Stadium Municipal d'Albi

== Championships records ==
=== Men ===
Event	Record	Athlete/Team	Date	Championships	Place	Ref.
100 m	9.88 (+1.9 m/s)	Jimmy Vicaut	July 2016	2016 Championships	Angers	
200 m	20.16	Christophe Lemaitre	July 2010	2010 Championships	Valence	
400 m	44.24 NR	Samuel Vessat	26 July 2026	2026 Championships	Albi	
800 m	1:45.57	Pierre-Ambroise Bosse	July 2014	2014 Championships	Reims	
Shot put	20.75 m	Frederic Dagee	26 June 2021	2021 Championships	Angers	
10000m walk (track)	37:23.99 WB	Gabriel Bordier	2 August 2025	2025 Championships	Talence	

=== Women ===
Event	Record	Athlete/Team	Date	Championships	Place	Ref.
400 m	50.47	Isabelle Black	24 July 2026	2026 Championships	Albi	
800 m	1:58.71	Rénelle Lamote	26 June 2022	2022 Championships	Caen	
100 m hurdles	12.56 (+1.2 m/s) NR	Cindy Billaud	12 July 2014	2014 Championships	Reims	
400 m hurdles	53.71	Louise Maraval	30 June 2024	2024 Championships	Angers	
3000 m steeplechase	9:29.78	Alice Finot	29 June 2024	2024 Championships	Angers	
Pole vault	4.73 m	Ninon Guillon-Romarin	July 2018	2018 Championships	Albi	
Long jump	6.98 m (+0.9 m/s)	Hilary Kpatcha	24 July 2026	2026 Championships	Albi	
Hammer throw	73.85 m	Alexandra Tavernier	26 June 2021	2021 Championships	Angers	
Javelin throw	61.49 m	Alexie Alaïs	27 July 2019	2019 Championships	Saint-Étienne	
10,000 m walk (track)	44:08.73	Clémence Beretta	26 June 2022	2022 Championships	Caen	
