= 1992 French Athletics Championships =

- Dates: 26-28 June 1992
- Host city: Narbonne
- Venue: Parc des sports et de l'amitié
- French Athletics Championships

The 1992 French Athletics Championships took place from 26-28 June 1992 at the Parc des sports et de l'amitié in Narbonne.

== Titles ==
Discipline	Men		Women	
100 m	Jean-Charles Trouabal	10 s 58	Laurence Bily	11 s 45
200 m	Jean-Charles Trouabal	20 s 51	Marie-José Pérec	22 s 55
400 m	Stéphane Diagana	45 s 18	Elsa Devassoigne	52 s 34
800 m	Frédéric Cornette	1 min 46 s 66	Viviane Dorsile	1 min 59 s 29
1 500 m	Pascal Thiébaut	3 min 39 s 08	Frédérique Quentin	4 min 12 s 93
3 000 m	-	-	Marie-Pierre Duros	8 min 45 s 96
5 000 m	Tony Martins	13 min 33 s 98	-	-
10 000 m	Thierry Pantel	28 min 13 s 92	Rosario Murcia	33 min 15 s 05
100 m hurdles	-	-	Anne Piquereau	12 s 85
110 m hurdles	Dan Philibert	13 s 35	-	-
400 m hurdles	Stéphane Caristan	49 s 55	Carole Nelson	57 s 65
3000 m steeplechase	Joseph Mahmoud	8 min 26 s 58	-	-
Long jump	Jean-Luc Poussin	7,81 m	Caroline Missoudan	6,31 m
Triple jump	Pierre Camara	17,06 m	Sylvie Borda	13,24 m
High jump	Joël Vincent	2,24 m	Sandrine Fricot	1,93 m
Pole vault	Philippe Collet	5,70 m	-	-
Shot put	Luc Viudès	18,77 m	Annick Lefebvre	15,96 m
Discus	Jean-Claude Retel	57,06 m	Isabelle Devaluez	55,82 m
Hammer	Raphaël Piolanti	75,86 m	-	-
Javelin	Pascal Lefevre	79,14 m	Martine Bègue	55,16 m
Decathlon / Heptathlon	Alain Blondel	8109 pts	Nathalie Teppe	6145 pts
