= Michael Gras =

French long-distance runner

Personal information
- Born: 15 September 1991 (age 34)

Sport
- Country: France
- Sport: Long-distance running

Michael Gras (born 15 September 1991) is a French long-distance runner.

In 2015, he won the silver medal in the men's 5000 metres event at the 2015 French Athletics Championships.

In 2019, he competed in the senior men's race at the 2019 IAAF World Cross Country Championships held in Aarhus, Denmark. He finished in 71st place.

In 2024, he won the French national cross country.
