= Claire Orcel =

Belgian high jumper

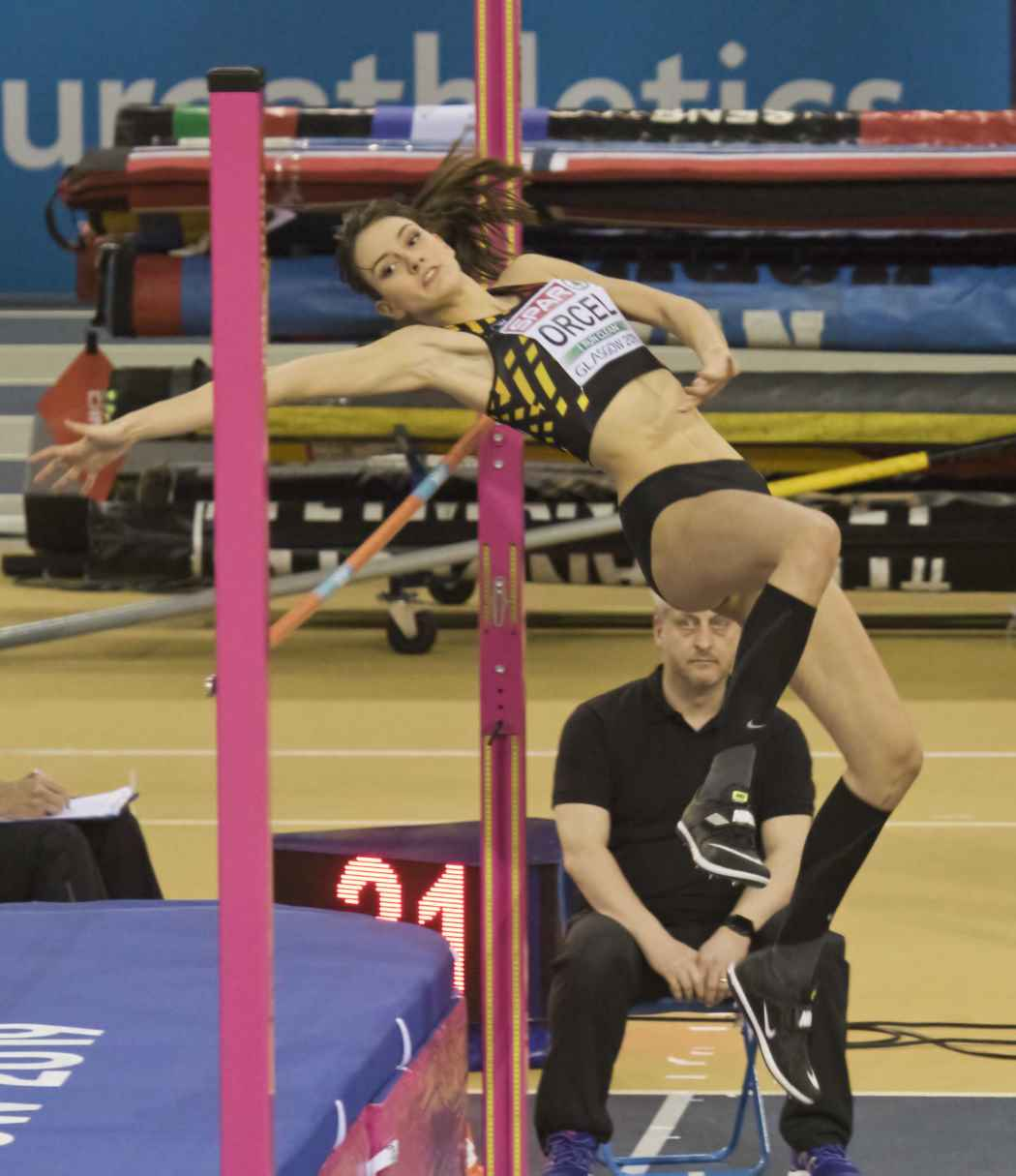

Claire Orcel (born 2 December 1997 in Uccle) is a French and Belgian high jumper who competes for Belgium.

She won the silver medal at the 2017 Jeux de la Francophonie in Abidjan. She won the 2019 French championships in Saint-Étienne with 1.94 m, her personal best. She finished second at the 2019 European Team Championships. She qualified for the final at the 2019 World Athletics Championships.
