= Jean-Adret Stadium =

Athletics stadium in Sotteville-lès-Rouen, France

Stade Jean-Adret
- Location within France
- Address: 31 avenue du 14-Juillet; 76300 Sotteville-lès-Rouen
- Coordinates: 49.241°N 01.054°E
- Capacity: 1300 places seated

Tenants
- Stade sottevillais 76

The Jean-Adret Stadium is the main Stadium for athletics in the Rouen area. It is the stadium for the resident club Stadium Sottevillais 76.

== Historical ==
The France Championships in Athletics took place there in July 2004.

The Sotteville-lès-Rouen international athletics meeting is held at the stadium every year in June.

== Access ==
- Public transport Rouen:
- By car: Access by the A13
- By train: Rouen station
- By plane: Rouen Seine Valley Airport
