= Stade Henri-Lux =

Athletics complex in Saint-Étienne, France

- Location within France
- Address: 5, allée des Frères-Gauthier 42000 Saint-Étienne
- Coordinates: 45.463°N 4.388°E
- Elevation: 515 m (1,690 ft)
- Capacity: 2,700

Tenants
- Coquelicot 42 (CASE - Athletic Club of Saint-Étienne)

The Henri-Lux Stadium, located in Saint-Étienne, is a sports complex exclusively dedicated to the practice of athletics. It is named after Henri Lux, a notable local figure who played a significant role in the development of sports in the region.

== Track and Stands ==
The standout feature of the stadium is its eight-lane track, recognized for its speed, providing optimal conditions for high-level athletic performances. This characteristic makes it a sought-after venue for both national and international competitions.

The stadium stands have a seating capacity for up to 2,700 spectators.

== National and International Sporting Events ==
The Henri-Lux Stadium has hosted various significant sporting events, both nationally and internationally. Among these competitions are the World Para Athletics Championships, a major event showcasing the athletic achievements of athletes with disabilities. The stadium has also been the venue for the UNSS Games in 2000.

Furthermore, the Henri-Lux Stadium has been selected to host the French Athletics Championships on multiple occasions, including in 2001, 2002, and 2019.
