= Violaine Averous =

French athlete

Personal information
- Nationality: French
- Born: 15 March 1985 (age 40) Toulouse, France
- Height: 1.66 m (5 ft 5 in)

Sport
- Event: Racewalking

Violaine Averous (born 15 March 1985) is a French athlete who specializes in racewalking.

== Biography ==
Violaine Averous started racewalking at the age of 14 as a way to train between sports seasons in school. In 2009, she was listed as the director of a nursery school in Launaguet. Averous won the 2013 French Athletics Championships in the 10,000 metre walk, and placed 3rd in the discipline at the same event in 2015, with a time of 48:46.45.

== Personal life ==
Averous' father was a German teacher. She has two sisters, both of whom are teachers as well. She is a Toulouse FC supporter.
