= Augustin Bey =

French long jumper (born 1995)

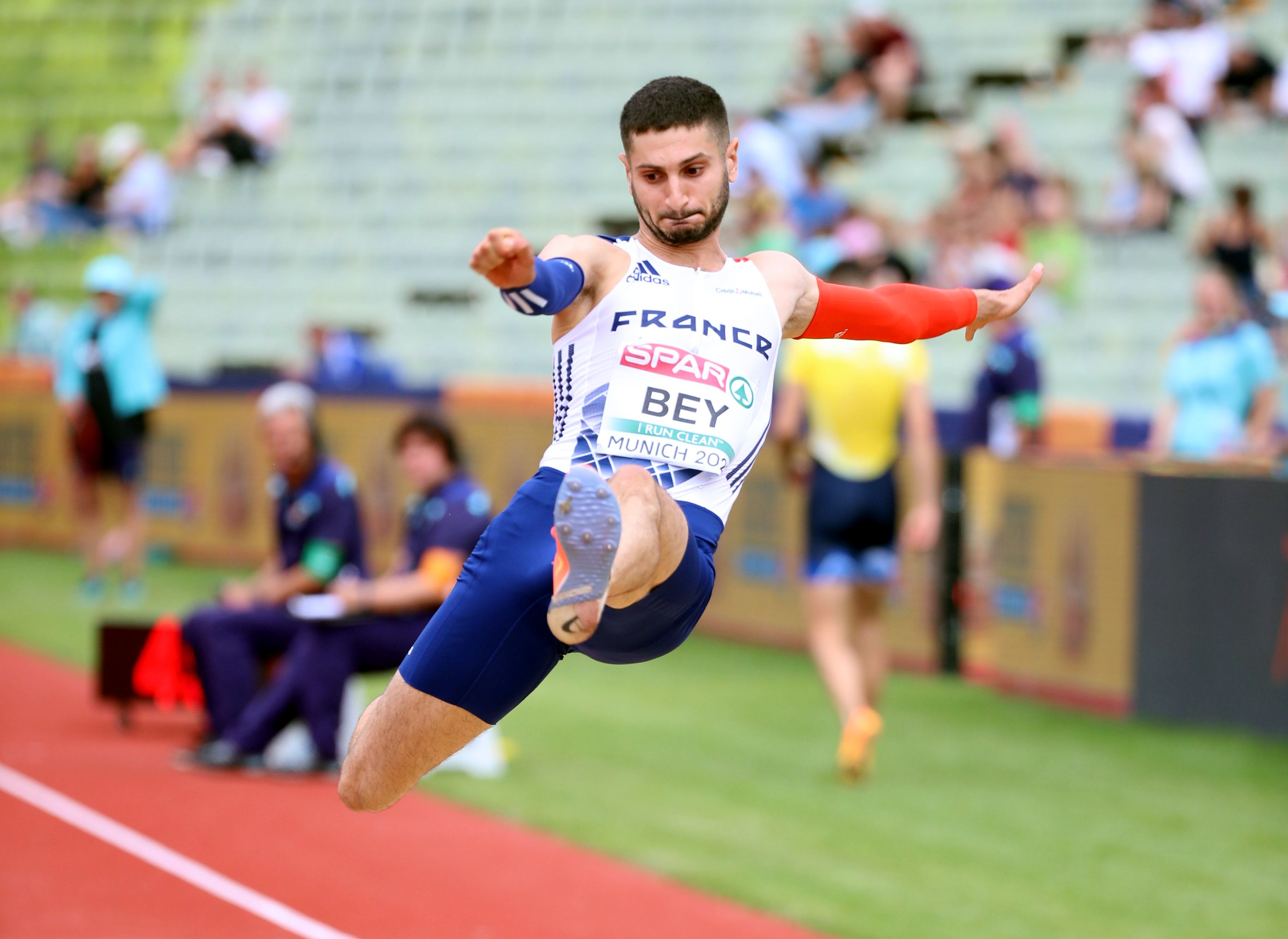
- Bey in 2022

Personal information
- Born: 6 June 1995 (age 31) Sarrebourg, France
- Height: 182 cm (6 ft 0 in)
- Weight: 67 kg (148 lb)

Sport
- Country: France
- Sport: Athletics
- Event: Long jump
- Club: Athlétisme Metz Métropole
- Coached by: Robert Emmiyan

Achievements and titles
- Personal best: Long jump: 8.16 m (26 ft 9 1/4 in) (Hengelo 2021)

Augustin Bey (born 6 June 1995) is a French track and field athlete who competes in the long jump. He qualified for the long jump at the 2020 Summer Olympics. He also won the event at the 2019 and 2021 French Athletics Championships, as well as at the 2020 French Indoor Athletics Championships. He also tied for the bronze medal with Eusebio Cáceres at the 2021 European Athletics Team Championships.
