= Marion Buisson =

French pole vaulter (born 1988)

Personal information
- Nationality: France
- Born: 19 February 1988 (age 38) Mende, Lozère, France
- Height: 1.76 m (5 ft 9 1/2 in)
- Weight: 55 kg (121 lb)

Sport
- Sport: Athletics
- Event: Pole vault
- Club: Clermont Athlétisme Auvergne
- Coached by: Joel Bailly

Achievements and titles
- Personal best: Pole vault: 4.50 m (2008)
Medal record
Women's Athletics
Representing France
Mediterranean Games
Bronze medal – third place	Mersin 2013	Pole vault

Marion Buisson (born 19 February 1988 in Mende, Lozère) is a French pole vaulter. She set her personal best height of 4.50 metres by upsetting her teammate Vanessa Boslak, and by winning the women's pole vault at the 2008 French Athletics Championships in Albi.

Buisson represented France at the 2008 Summer Olympics in Beijing, where she successfully cleared a height of 4.15 metres in the women's pole vault, an event which was later dominated by world-record holder Yelena Isinbayeva of Russia. Buisson, however, failed to advance into the final, as she placed twenty-third overall in the qualifying rounds, tying her position with Iceland's Thórey Edda Elisdóttir.
