= Liv Westphal =

French long-distance runner

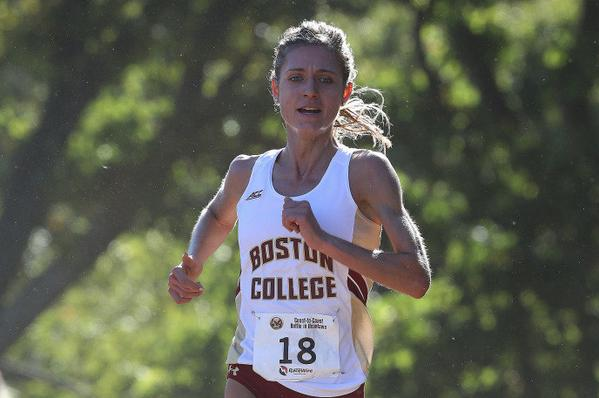
- Liv Westphal at a cross country competition in Boston

Personal information
- Nationality: French
- Born: December 22, 1993 (age 31) Milan, Italy
- Height: 1.68 m (5 ft 6 in)

Sport
- Sport: Track and Field
- Event(s): 5000 m, 10 km, cross-country

Liv Westphal (born December 22, 1993, in Milan, Italy) is a French long-distance runner. She is the current French record holder for the 10 km and the 5000m indoor. She is a four-time national champion.

She earned a bachelor's degree in communications from Boston College in May 2015, a Master of Science in leadership and administration from Boston College in May 2016, and a Master of Arts in Romance languages from Boston College in May 2018.

She earned a master's degree in sport management from the RCS MediaGroup Academy, in Milan, Italy, in March 2023.

== Biography ==
Westphal was born in Milan, Italy, in 1993, but grew up in Limoges, France. She has dual French and Italian citizenships.

Westphal competed for Boston College from 2011 to 2016, where she was a two-time NCAA Division I cross country All-American honoree by the USTFCCCA (2013 and 2014) and one time NCAA Division I outdoor track and field All-American honoree for the 5,000m (2015).

She was named ACC Cross-country performer of the year in 2014.

She was inducted into the Boston College Varsity Club Athletic Hall of Fame on October 7, 2022.

In the meantime, Westphal is a two-time French Junior champion in the 3000 m. She finished twelfth in the junior race at the 2012 European Cross-country Championships, in Budapest, Hungary, and eleventh in the 3000 m at the 2012 World Junior Championships in Barcelona, Spain.

She finished 6th in the Under-23 race at the 2013 European Cross-Country Championships in Belgrade, Serbia, and 5th in the 5000 m at the 2013 European Athletics Under-23 Championships in Tampere, Finland. In March 2017, Westphal's 5th place was upgraded to a bronze medal due to the disqualifications of Gamze Bulut and Tsehainesh Tsale.

On December 6, 2014, in Boston, she broke the French record for the 5000 m indoor in a time of 15 min 31 s 62. In February 2015, she ran 9 min 08 s 99 for 3000 m indoor and broke the Under-23 French record. Three months later, at the ACC Championship in Tallahassee, Florida, she ran 33 min 42 s 03 in the first 10,000 meters of her career and broke her third Under-23 French record of the 2015 season.

On July 12, 2015, she won the 5000 meters at the European Under-23 Championship in Tallinn, Estonia, and broke the Under-23 French record in 15 min 30 s 61. Two weeks later, she took part in the 5000m at the Salinsbury Games in London, Great Britain, and lowered, for the third time, the Under-23 French record to 15 min 28 s 61.

On October 12, 2015, she took part in her first 10k road race at the Tufts Health Plan 10k for Women and broke the Under-23 French 10k road race record in the time of 33 min 26 s.

On December 13, 2015, aged 21, she competed in the senior race at the European Cross Country Championship in Hyères, France. She finished 20th, while the French senior women team won the silver medal.

On October 23, 2016, she won the Mayor's Cup Cross Country meet in 16 min 53 s ahead of Amy Van Alstine and Mary Cain in historic Franklin Park, hosted by B.A.A. and USATF New England.

On December 11, 2016, she competed in the senior race at the European Cross Country Championship in Chia, Italy, and finished 9th.

In 2019, she competed in the senior women's race at the 2019 IAAF World Cross Country Championships held in Aarhus, Denmark. She finished in 22nd place.

On December 5, 2019, she competed in the senior race at the European Cross Country Championship in Lisbon, Portugal, and finished 5th.

On December 29, 2019, she broke the French record of the 10 km with a time of 31 min 15 s during the Corrida de Houilles.

On February 15, 2020, she broke the 5 km French record with a time of 15 min 31 s at the Monaco Run in Monaco.

=== Records ===
Personal Bests
Event	Performance	Location	Date
5 000 m	15:28.71	London	July 25, 2015
5 000 m (Indoors)	15:31.62 (NR)	Boston	December 6, 2014
10 000 m	32:2.50	London	July 6, 2019
10 km	31:15 (NR)	Houilles	December 29, 2019

=== Achievements ===
International rankings
Date	Competition	Location	Result	Event	Performance
2013	European Championship U23s	Tampere	3rd	5 000 m	16:08.85
2015	European Championship U23s	Tallinn	1st	5 000 m	15:30.61
2015	European Cross Country Championships	Hyères	20th		
2016	European Cross Country Championships	Chia	9th		
2019	European Cross Country Championships	Lisbon	5th		
2019	World Cross Country Championships	Aarhus	22nd		
