= Fanny Quenot =

French hurdler (born 1990)

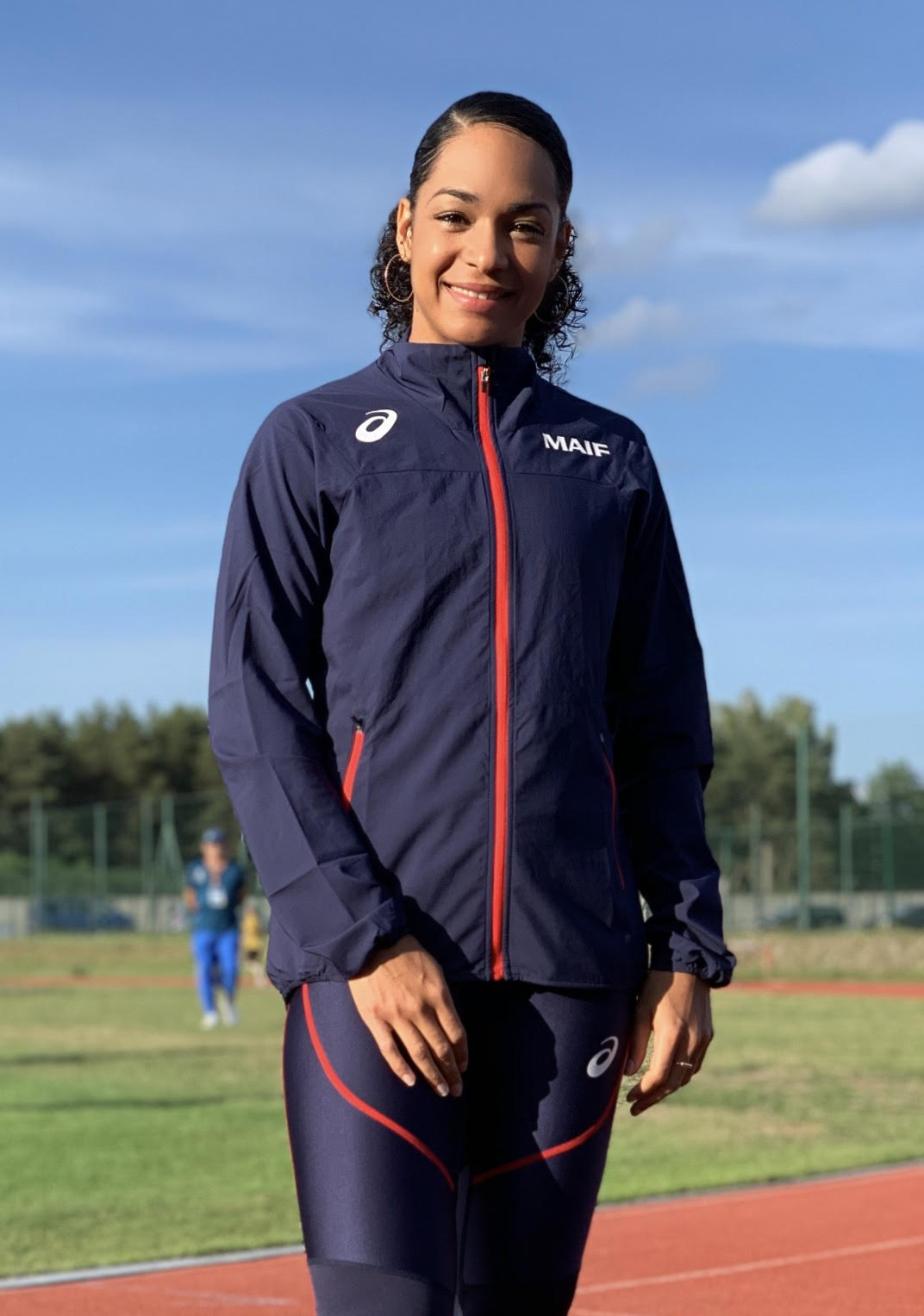
- Fanny Quenot in 2019

Personal information
- Nationality: French
- Born: 2 October 1990 (age 35)

Sport
- Sport: Athletics
- Event: Hurdles

Fanny Quenot (born 2 October 1990) is a French former athlete. She competed in the women's 100 metres hurdles event at the 2019 World Athletics Championships.
