= Clarisse Moh =

French middle-distance runner

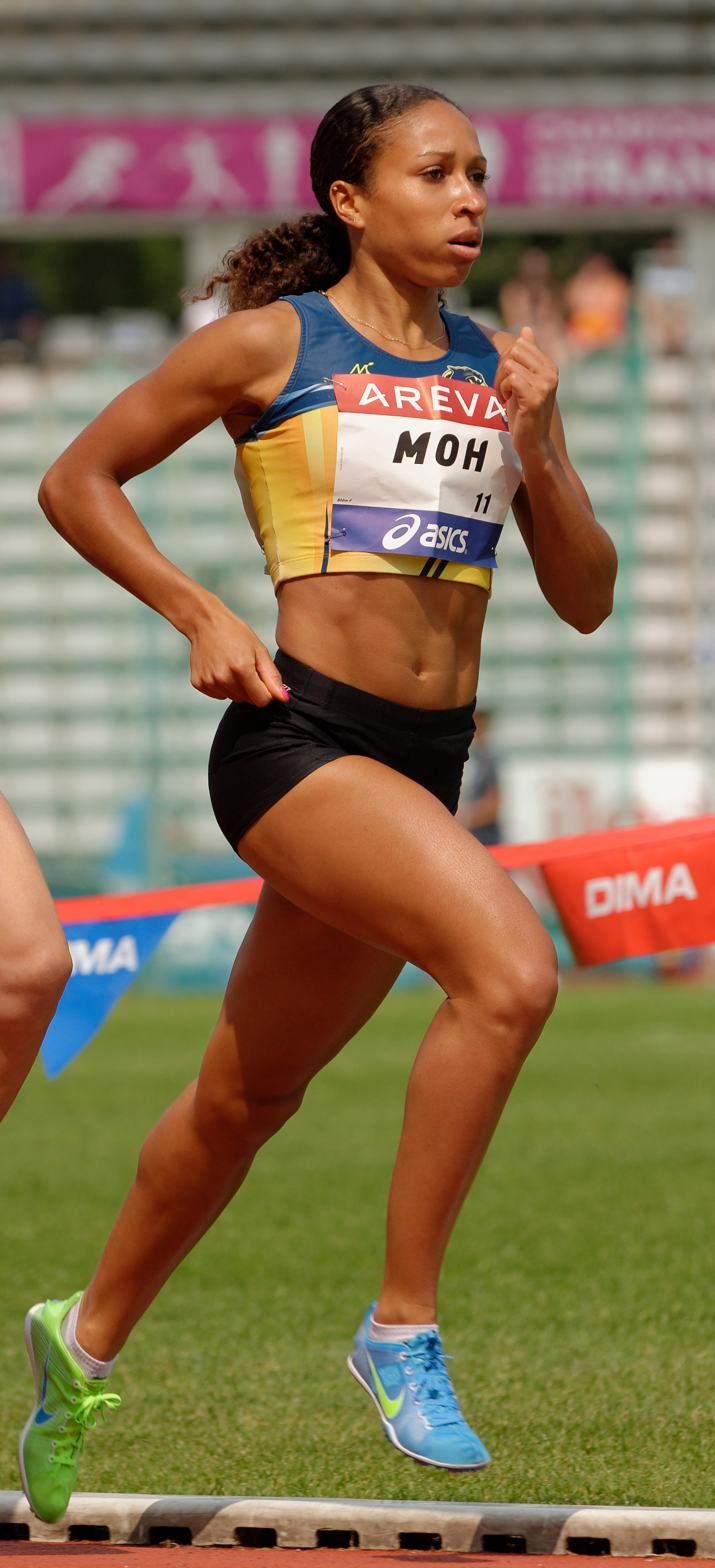
- Clarisse Moh in 2013

Personal information
- Nationality: French
- Born: 6 December 1986 (age 39) Paris
- Years active: 2010s

Sport
- Event: 800 m
- Club: CA Montreuil 93

Clarisse Moh (born 6 December 1986 in Paris) is a French athlete who specializes in the 800 metres.

== Biography ==
She won the 800 metres at the French Championships in 2011 and 2013. During the 2013 Mediterranean Games, in Myrtle, she won the bronze medal in the 4 × 400 m relay.

Moh competed for the Seton Hall Pirates track and field team in the NCAA.

=== Prize list ===
International Awards
Date	Competition	Location	Result	Event	Performance
2013	Mediterranean Games	Mersin	3rd	4 × 400 m	3 min 35 s 20
2013	DecaNation	Valence	2nd	800 m	2 min 04 s 82
2014	World relays	Nassau	6th	4 × 800 m	8 min 17 s 54 (NR)
2015	World relays	Nassau	6th	Medley Relay	11 min 06 s 33

=== Records ===
Personal Bests
Event	Performance	Location	Date
800 m	2:01.43	Oordegem-Lede	6 July 2013
