= Mathilde Andraud =

French javelin thrower

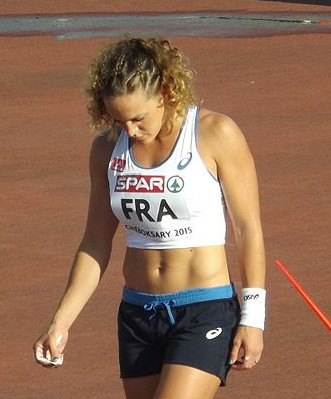
- Andraud in 2015

Personal information
- Born: 28 April 1989 (age 37) Montpellier, France
- Height: 173 cm (5 ft 8 in)
- Weight: 73 kg (161 lb)

Sport
- Country: France
- Sport: Athletics
- Event: Javelin throw

Mathilde Andraud (born 28 April 1989, in Montpellier) is a French athlete who is a specialist in the javelin throw.

She was French junior champion in 2008, then Under-21 champion in 2011. She won five national titles in the javelin at the French Athletics Championships, in 2012, 2013, 2014, 2015 and 2016.

She set a personal best of 59.80 m (196 ft 2 1/4 in) on 18 July 2014 in Monaco, but this distance did not reach the minimum distance (60 m) to participate in the Zurich European Championships. In 2015, she improved her personal best under disastrous weather conditions disastrous to 60.60 m (198 ft 9 3/4 in). However, she missed qualifying for the World championships in Beijing by 40 centimetres.

At the end of the 2016 season, she quit her coach, Magali Brisseault, to train at Montpellier with Jean-Yves Cochand and at Offenbourg with Werner Daniels, the coach of the legendary Christina Obergföll.

== International competitions ==
Year	Competition	Venue	Position	Notes
2010	European Team Championships	Bergen, Norway	10th	48.54 m
2014	European Cup throws	Leiria, Portugal	9th	54.75 m
2015	European Cup throws	Leiria, Portugal	5th	58.75 m
2015	European Team Championships	Cheboksary, Russia	11th	52.93 m
2016	Olympic Games	Rio de Janeiro, Brazil	24th (q)	56.61 m

== National titles ==
- French Athletics Championships
  - Javelin throw: 2012, 2013, 2014, 2015, 2016

=== Records ===
Event	Performance	Location	Date
Javelin throw	63.54m (NR)	Halle	21 May 2016
