= Estelle Perrossier =

French sprinter

Personal information
- Born: 12 January 1990 (age 35) Lyon, France
- Height: 1.63 m (5 ft 4 in)

Sport
- Sport: Athletics
- Event: 400 metres

Estelle Perrossier (born 12 January 1990) is a French sprinter specialising in the 400 metres. She competed in the 4 × 400 metres relay event at the 2015 World Championships in Athletics in Beijing. Her personal bests in the event are 52.25 seconds outdoors (Saint-Étienne 2015) and 53.67 seconds indoors (Ghent 2016).

== International competitions ==
Year	Competition	Venue	Position	Event	Notes
Representing France
2014	World Relays	Nassau, Bahamas	6th (h)	4 × 400 m relay	3:28.93
2014	European Championships	Zürich, Switzerland	4th (h)	4 × 400 m relay	3:28.58
2015	World Championships	Beijing, China	7th	4 × 400 m relay	3:26.45
2017	World Relays	Nassau, Bahamas	6th	4 × 200 m relay	1:35.11
2017	World Championships	London, United Kingdom	4th	4 × 400 m relay	3:26.56
2018	European Championships	Berlin, Germany	4th (h)	4 × 400 m relay	3:28.61
2019	World Relays	Yokohama, Japan	8th	4 × 400 m relay	3:36.28
