= Sofiane Selmouni =

French middle-distance runner

Personal information
- Born: 22 September 1989 (age 36) Oran, Algeria
- Height: 1.93 m (6 ft 4 in)
- Weight: 76 kg (168 lb)

Sport
- Sport: Athletics
- Event(s): 800 m, 1500 m
- Club: Ac Illzach Kingersheim; Entente Grand Mulhouse Athlé
- Coached by: Alain Lignier

Sofiane Selmouni (born 22 September 1989 in Oran) is an Algerian-born French middle-distance runner. He finished sixth at the 2017 European Indoor Championships.

== International competitions ==
Year	Competition	Venue	Position	Event	Notes
Representing France
2014	European Championships	Zürich, Switzerland	15th (sf)	800 m	1:51.01
2016	European Championships	Amsterdam, Netherlands	27th (h)	800 m	1:51.32
2017	European Indoor Championships	Belgrade, Serbia	6th	1500 m	3:46.70

== Personal bests ==
Outdoor

- 400 metres – 49.21 (Mulhouse 2013)
- 600 metres – 1:23.29 (Illzach 2011)
- 800 metres – 1:45.94 (Montreuil-sous-Bois 2014)
- 1000 metres – 2:21.44 (Schifflange 2012)
- 1500 metres – 3:40.01 (Brussels 2015)

Indoor

- 800 metres – 1:53.80 (Metz 2012)
- 1000 metres – 2:21.98 (Metz 2015)
- 1500 metres – 3:39.88 (Karlsruhe 2017)
