= Nathalie Marie-Nely =

French triple jumper

Personal information
- Nationality: France
- Born: 24 November 1986 (age 38) Le Lamentin
- Height: 1.75 m (5 ft 9 in)

Sport
- Event: Triple Jump
- Club: CA Montreuil 93
- Coached by: Georges Sainte-Rose

Nathalie Marie-Nely (born 24 November 1986 at Lamentin) is a French athlete, who specializes in the triple jump.

== Biography ==
Nathalie was Junior Champion of France in the triple jump in 2004 and 2005 and Under 21s champion of France in 2006. She won the elite Triple Jump National titles in 2011 and 2014. She also won two National titles Indoors, in 2012 and 2013.

Her personal record, set on 5 June 2012 at Montreuil-sous-Bois, is 14.03 m.

=== Prize list ===
- French Championships in Athletics :
  - winner of the triple jump 2011 and 2014
- French Indoor Athletics Championships:
  - winner of the triple jump 2012 and 2013

=== Records ===
Personal records
Event	Performance	Location	Date
Triple jump	14.03 m	Montreuil-sous-Bois	5 June 2012
