= Carolle Zahi =

French sprinter

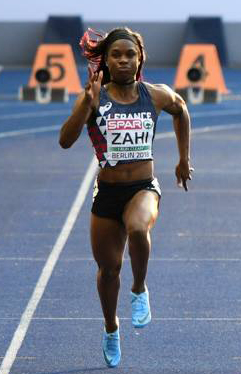
- Zahi in 2018

Personal information
- Nationality: French
- Born: 12 June 1994 (age 32) Bingerville, Ivory Coast
- Height: 1.70 m (5 ft 7 in)
- Weight: 66 kg (146 lb)

Sport
- Country: France
- Sport: Athletics (Sprinting)
- Event: 100 metres

Carolle Zahi (born 12 June 1994) is an Ivorian-French sprinter. She obtained French nationality and began representing France internationally in 2015. She had already been the 2011 French Youth champion in the 100 meters. She was the French national champion and fastest non-qualifier in the 60 meters at the 2016 World Indoor Championships. Later that year, she was an alternate for the French Olympic 4 × 100 relay team, but never took the track.

She was the 2017 French champion in the 100 meters. She won the 2017 European Team Championships and later competed in the women's 100 metres at the 2017 World Championships in Athletics. In 2018 she returned to the World Indoor Championships, running a personal best 7.11 to be the top qualifier in the heats.
