= Alexie Alaïs =

French javelin thrower (born 1994)

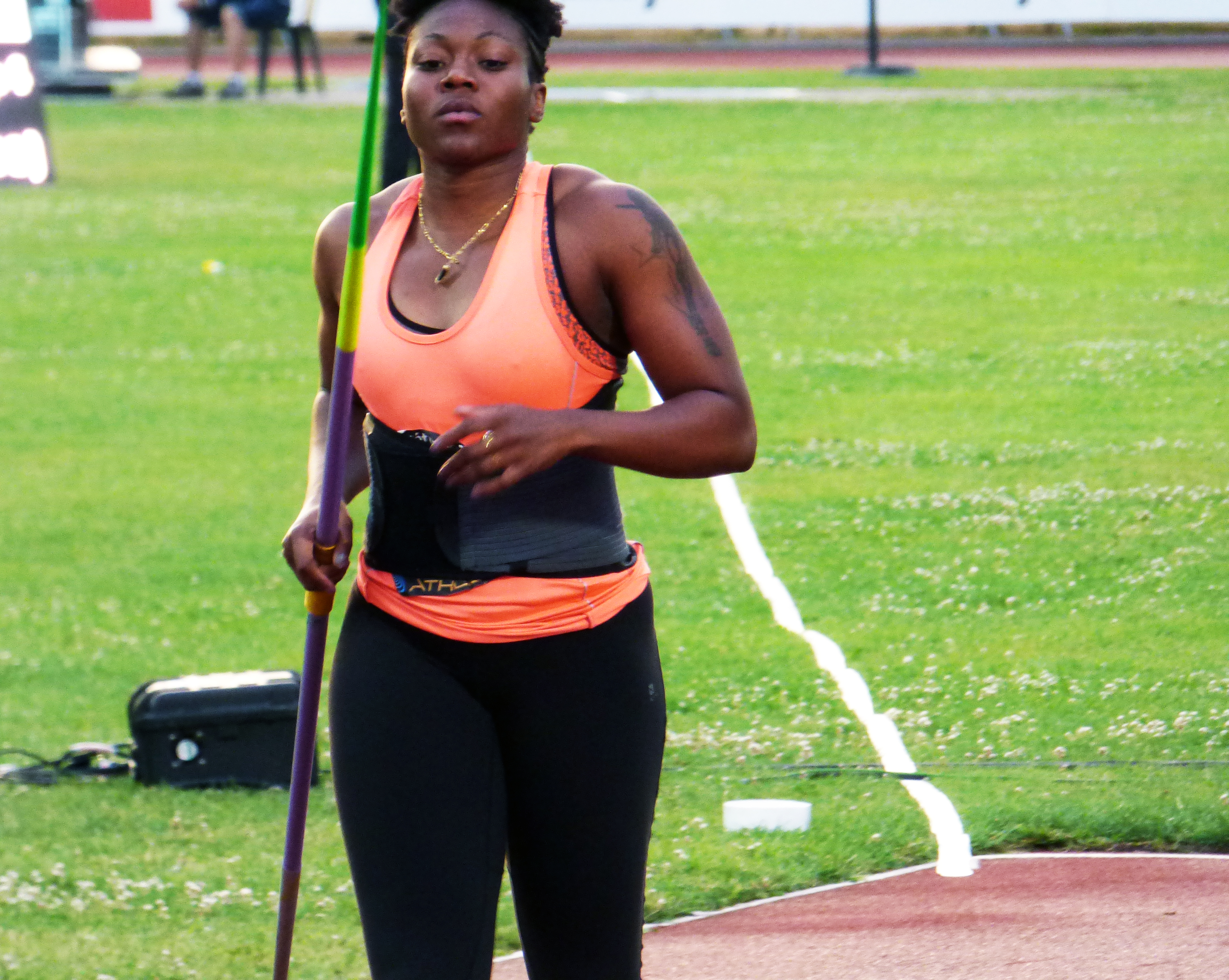
- Alaïs in 2017

Personal information
- Born: 9 October 1994 (age 31) Kourou, French Guiana
- Height: 1.69 m (5 ft 7 in)
- Weight: 70 kg (154 lb)

Sport
- Sport: Athletics
- Event: Javelin throw
- Club: C.A. Montreuil 93
- Coached by: Brisseault Waldet Magali (2015–)

Alexie Alaïs (born 9 October 1994 in Kourou, French Guiana) is a French athlete specialising in the javelin throw. She finished sixth at the 2018 European Championships.

Her personal best in the event is 63.46 metres set in Bydgoszcz in 2019.

Alaïs served an 18-month competition ban from January 2025 to July 2025 for an anti-doping rule violation after testing positive for sibutramine.

== International competitions ==
| Year | Competition | Venue | Position | Event | Notes |
Representing France and French Guiana
| 2009 | CARIFTA Games (U17) | Vieux Fort, Saint Lucia | 20th (h) | 100m | 12.63s |
| 2009 | CARIFTA Games (U17) | Vieux Fort, Saint Lucia | 1st | Javelin throw | 38.08 m |
| 2011 | CARIFTA Games (U20) | Montego Bay, Jamaica | 1st | Javelin throw | 47.24 m |
| 2011 | World Youth Championships | Lille, France | 6th | Javelin throw | 49.33 m |
| 2011 | European Youth Olympic Festival | Trabzon, Turkey | 3rd | Javelin throw | 50.94 m |
| 2012 | CARIFTA Games (U20) | Hamilton, Bermuda | 1st | Javelin throw | 47.17 m |
| 2012 | World Junior Championships | Barcelona, Spain | 13th (q) | Javelin throw | 50.52 m |
| 2013 | European Junior Championships | Rieti, Italy | 22nd (q) | Javelin throw | 40.83 m |
| 2014 | Mediterranean U23 Championships | Aubagne, France | 1st | Javelin throw | 56.30 m |
| 2018 | World Cup | London, United Kingdom | 5th | Javelin throw | 53.36 m |
| 2018 | European Championships | Berlin, Germany | 6th | Javelin throw | 60.01 m |
| 2019 | World Championships | Doha, Qatar | 14th (q) | Javelin throw | 60.46 m |
