= Ninon Chapelle =

French pole vaulter (born 1995)

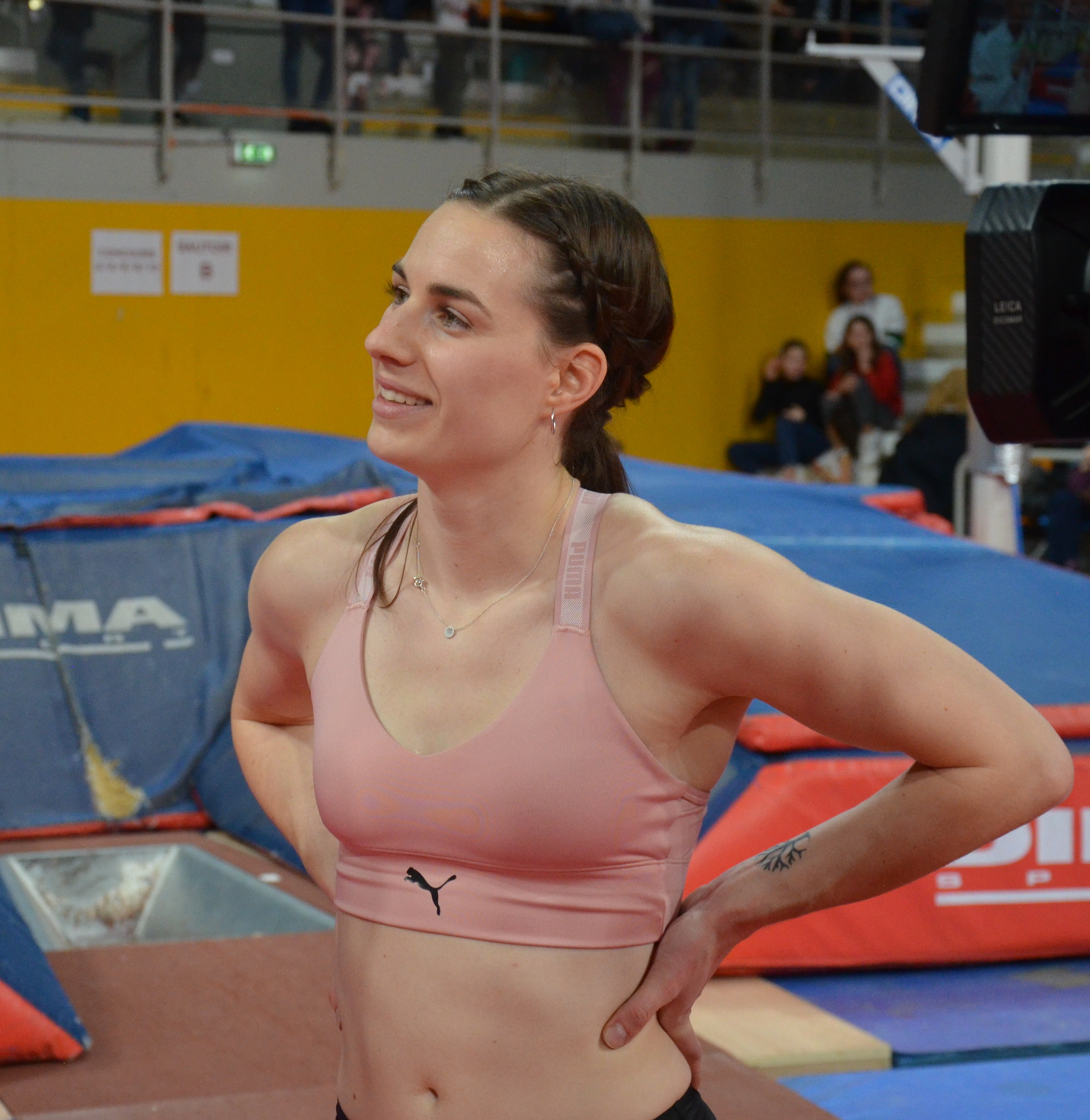
- Ninon Chapelle in 2020

Personal information
- Born: 15 April 1995 (age 31) Metz, France
- Height: 1.63 m (5 ft 4 in)
- Weight: 53 kg (117 lb)

Sport
- Country: France
- Sport: Athletics
- Event: Pole vault
- Club: EA Cergy-Pontoise Athlétisme
- Coached by: Axel Chapelle

Ninon Chapelle (née Guillon-Romarin, born 15 April 1995) is a French pole vaulter. She competed in the women's pole vault at the 2017 World Championships in Athletics. She represented France in 2017 European Team Championships, where she was 3rd with a jump of 4.45m in Lille. At the 2017 European Athletics U23 Championships she finished in 5th place with a jump of 4.35m.

She holds the French indoor record with a jump of 4.72 m, set on 25 February 2018 in Clermont-Ferrand.

She married fellow French pole vaulter Axel Chapelle, they have a boy named Oscar, born in 2022.
