= Ophélie Claude-Boxberger =

French middle-distance runner

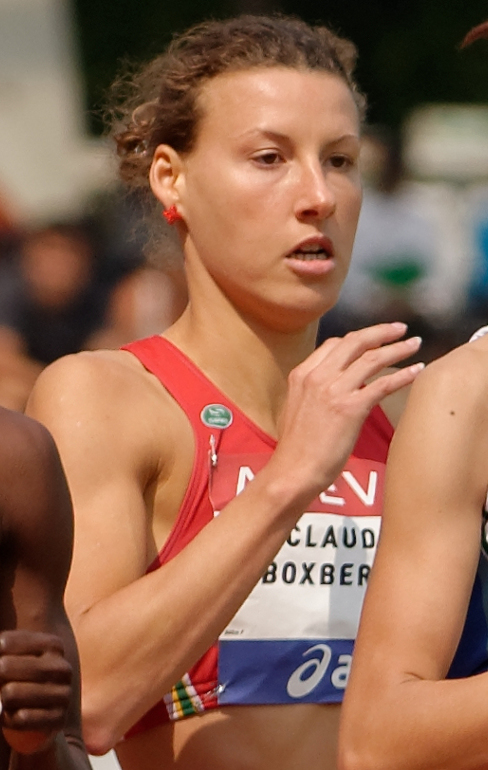
- Claude-Boxberger in 2013

Personal information
- Nationality: French
- Born: 18 October 1988 (age 37) Montbéliard
- Years active: 2010s
- Height: 1.70 m (5 ft 7 in)
- Weight: 53 kg (117 lb)

Sport
- Events: 800m, 1500m, 3000m steeplechase
- Club: Montbéliard Belfort Athlétisme
- Coached by: Laurent Fleury

Ophélie Claude-Boxberger, born 18 October 1988 at Montbéliard is a French athlete running for club Belfort Montbeliard Athletics. A specialist in the middle-distance races, she won 4 French Under 23s national championship titles in the 800 m and the 1,500 m and ran internationally twice for France before becoming champion of France Indoors in the 1,500 m and outdoors champion in the 3000m steeplechase.

She is the daughter of the distance runner: Jacky Boxberger.

== Biography ==
She started athletics in September 2001 after practicing several sports: Dance, horseback riding, tennis, climbing and gymnastics nationally. Among the best French youngsters at 1,000 m (3:03), she focused more on her studies which caused a slow progression in her running. In 2007, she met Laurent Fleury, during a training camp, who became her coach. She had strong progress in 2008 which enabled her to win her first cap for France for an international meet in the 800 m at Lingolsheim.

After spending her early career running the 800 m and having a semi-finalist placing at the 2009 Under 23s European Athletics Championships at kaunas, she changed tack in 2014 deciding to go for longer distances, allowing her to obtain her first French Indoor athletic championship with a record of 4:13.23 in the 1,500 m, at the international meeting of Karlsruhe, just missing out on qualification for the World Indoor Championships. In 2015, she won the title of champion of France for the 3000m steeplechase and became the fourth fastest French runner in history running 9:35.56 at the Ninove meeting on 1 August.

After earning a bachelor of science with honors in 2006, she became professor of physical education after successfully gaining a CAPEPS and a masters in language and speech in 2010 at the University of Besançon.

She was tested positive for erythropoietin (EPO) during a test carried out on 28 September 2019, just before the world athletics championships in Doha where she revealed her affair with the doctor of the French team, Jean -Michel Serra.

== Prize list ==
=== National ===
Date	Competition	Location	Result	Event	Temps
2012	France Indoor Championships	Aubière	2nd	800 m	2:08.76
2013	France Indoor Championships	Aubière	3rd	800 m	2:05.90
2013	France Championships	Paris-Charléty	2nd	800m	2:06.64
2014	France Indoor Championships	Bordeaux	1st	1,500 m	4:23.71
2015	France Championships	Villeneuve-d'Ascq	1st	3,000 m steeplechase	9:59.86
2015	France Championships	Villeneuve-d'Ascq	2nd	1500m	4:21.81
