= Quentin Bigot =

French hammer thrower (born 1992)

Personal information
- Born: 1 December 1992 (age 33) Hayange, France
- Height: 178 cm (5 ft 10 in)
- Weight: 101 kg (223 lb)

Sport
- Country: France
- Sport: Athletics
- Event: Hammer throw
- Club: Athlétisme Metz Métropole; Florange Olympic Club Athlétisme
- Coached by: Pierre-Jean Vazel
Medal record
World Championships
Silver medal – second place	2019 Doha	Hammer throw

Quentin Bigot (French: [kɑ̃tɛ̃ biɡo]; born 1 December 1992) is a French athlete specialising in the hammer throw. He won the silver medal at the 2019 World Championships.

In July 2014 he was suspended for 4 years (2 on probation) for doping.

On 22 May 2021, he did his personal best with 78.99 m at Polideportivo Municipal, Andújar (ESP), improved on 8 June 2021 with 79.70 m at Paavo Nurmi Games in Turku.

== Competition record ==
Year	Competition	Venue	Position	Event	Notes
Representing France
2009	World Youth Championships	Brixen, Italy	13th (q)	Hammer (5 kg)	65.33 m
2010	World Junior Championships	Moncton, Canada	7th	Hammer (6 kg)	71.51 m
2011	European Junior Championships	Tallinn, Estonia	1st	Hammer	78.45 m
2012	European Championships	Helsinki, Finland	24th (q)	Hammer	70.78 m
2012	Olympic Games	London, United Kingdom	24th (q)	Hammer	72.42 m
2013	European Cup Winter Throwing (U23)	Castellón, Spain	1st	Hammer	71.79 m
2013	Mediterranean Games	Moscow, Russia	4th	Hammer	73.83 m
2013	European U23 Championships	Tampere, Finland	3rd	Hammer	74.00 m
2013	World Championships	Moscow, Russia	13th (q)	Hammer	74.98 m
2013	Jeux de la Francophonie	Nice, France	2nd	Hammer	74.60 m
2017	World Championships	London, United Kingdom	4th	Hammer	77.67 m
2018	European Championships	Berlin, Germany	16th (q)	Hammer	72.73 m
2019	World Championships	Doha, Qatar	2nd	Hammer	78.19 m
2021	Olympic Games	Tokyo, Japan	5th	Hammer	79.39 m
2022	World Championships	Eugene, United States	4th	Hammer	80.24 m
2022	European Championships	Munich, Germany	7th	Hammer	77.48 m
2024	European Championships	Rome, Italy	9th	Hammer	73.81 m
