= Solène Gicquel =

French athlete

Personal information
- Born: 1 December 1994 (age 31) Rennes, France
- Height: 189 cm (6 ft 2 in)
- Weight: 69 kg (152 lb)

Sport
- Country: France
- Sport: Athletics
- Event: High jump

Achievements and titles
- Personal bests: High jump: Outdoors 1.90m (Sotteville-lès-Rouen, 2021); High jump: Indoors 1.92m (Aubiére, 2023)

Solène Gicquel (born 1 December 1994) is a French track and field athlete. She is a multiple time French national champion in the high jump. She competed at the 2024 Olympic Games.

== Biography ==
From Rennes, Gicquel is a member of Stade Rennais. She won her first French Athletics Championships title in St Étienne in July 2019 with a clearance of 1.89 metres. The following February she won her first French Indoor Athletics Championships title in Liévin.

Gicquel won the French national title in Caen in June 2022, jumping 1.85 metres. She competed at the 2022 European Athletics Championships in Munich, Germany, clearing 1.87 metres to qualify for the final where she placed thirteenth overall.

Gicquel cleared a personal best height of 1.92m to win the French Indoor Championships title in Aubiére in February 2023. Making her World Championship debut in August 2023, she qualified for the high jump final at the 2023 World Athletics Championships in Budapest with a successful clearance of 1.89 metres. She placed fifteenth overall in the final.

Gicquel finished eighth in the high jump at the 2024 Diamond League event 2024 Meeting International Mohammed VI d'Athlétisme in Rabat in May 2024. The following month she competed at the 2024 European Athletics Championships in Rome. She competed in the high jump at the 2024 Paris Olympics, making a successful clearance of 1.88 metres but did not progress to the final.

Gicquel won the high jump with 1.92 metres at the 2026 French Indoor Athletics Championships in Aubiere. On 25 July 2026, she won the high jump with a clearance of 1.92 metres at the 2026 French Championships. On 15 August, she placed joint-eighth with a clearance of 1.88 metres at the 2026 European Championships in Birmingham, England.

== Personal life ==
From a family of athletes, her father Jean-Charles Gicquel, is himself a former French high jump champion. Her younger sister Lucille represents France at Volleyball. Her brother Clement Gicquel is also a high jumper.
