= Émilie Menuet =

French racewalker

Personal information
- Born: 27 September 1991 (age 35) Blois, France
- Height: 155 cm (5 ft 1 in)
- Weight: 44 kg (97 lb)

Sport
- Country: France
- Sport: Athletics (track and field)
- Event: Race walking
- Coached by: Pascal Chirat

Émilie Menuet (born 27 September 1991) is a female race walker from France. She competed in the Women's 20 kilometres walk event at the 2015 World Championships in Athletics in Beijing, China.

== Biography ==
On 1 July 2015, at Blois, she established a new record of France for the 5000m walk (21:41.72). She has held equally since 2010 the junior record of France at the 10 km walk (47:26).

In May 2015, when at the European Walking Cup at Murcie, elle bettered her personal record at the 20 km walk (1:32.20) and gained the minimum qualifier for the 2015 World Championships. She placed 31st at these World Championships

Champion of France at the 20 km walk in 2014, she won the title at the 10000m walk at the 2015 French Athletic Championships.

=== Prize list ===
- French Athletic Championships :
  - winner of 10 000 m walk in 2015
  - winner of 20 km walk in 2014
- French Indoor Athletic Championships :
  - winner of 3,000 m walk in 2015

=== Records ===
Personal Bests
Event	Performance	Location	Date
20 km walk	1:32.20	Murcie	17 May 2015

== See also ==
- France at the 2015 World Championships in Athletics
