= Pauline Pousse =

French discus thrower

Personal information
- Born: 17 September 1987 (age 39) Longjumeau, France
- Height: 1.84 m (6 ft 0 in)
- Weight: 84 kg (185 lb)

Sport
- Sport: Athletics
- Event: Discus throw
- Club: Athlé 91
- Coached by: Patrick Malliet

Pauline Pousse (born 17 September 1987) is a French athlete specialising in the discus throw. She won the bronze medal at the 2013 Jeux de la Francophonie.

Her personal best in the event is 62.68 metres set in Angers in 2016.

Five times Vice Champion of France from 2010 to 2015 (excepting 2011), Pauline Pousse improved in 2016 where she advanced her personal best almost 3 metres, throwing 62.68m in the 2016 French national championships where she qualified for the 2016 Rio Olympics and for the European Championships at Amsterdam.

On 10 July 2016, she placed 8th at the European Championships at Amsterdam with a throw of 59.62m.

== International competitions ==
Year	Competition	Venue	Position	Event	Notes
Representing France
2009	European U23 Championships	Kaunas, Lithuania	10th	Discus throw	48.90 m
2013	Mediterranean Games	Mersin, Turkey	4th	Discus throw	53.37 m
2013	Jeux de la Francophonie	Nice, France	3rd	Discus throw	53.07 m
2016	European Championships	Amsterdam, Netherlands	8th	Discus throw	59.62 m
2016	Olympic Games	Rio de Janeiro, Brazil	13th (q)	Discus throw	58.98 m
