= Kévin Campion =

French racewalker (born 1988)

Kévin Campion OLY
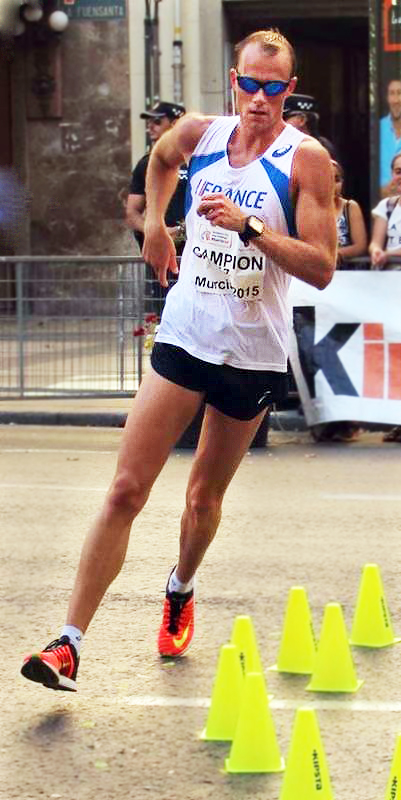
- Campion at the 2015 European Cup Race Walking

Personal information
- Born: 23 May 1988 (age 38) Vénissieux, France
- Height: 183 cm (6 ft 0 in)
- Weight: 68 kg (150 lb)

Sport
- Country: France
- Sport: Track and field
- Event: Race walking
- Club: Stade Dieppois
- Coached by: Martin Gauchet
Medal record
Jeux de la Francophonie
Gold medal – first place	2013 Nice	20 km walk
European Race Walking Cup
Bronze medal – third place	2011 Olhão	20 km walk team
Bronze medal – third place	2007 Royal Leamington Spa	10 km walk team junior

Kévin Campion (born 23 May 1988) is a male French racewalker. He competed in the 20 kilometres walk event at the 2015 World Championships in Athletics in Beijing, China. In 2019, he competed in the men's 20 kilometres walk at the 2019 World Athletics Championships held in Doha, Qatar. He finished in 16th place.

== See also ==
- France at the 2015 World Championships in Athletics
