= Frédéric Dagée =

French shot putter

Personal information
- Born: 11 December 1992 (age 33) Montargis, Loiret, France
- Height: 1.92 m (6 ft 4 in)
- Weight: 120 kg (265 lb)

Sport
- Sport: Athletics
- Event: Shot put
- Club: Nice Côte d'Azur Athlétisme
- Coached by: Jacques Pelgas

Frédéric Dagée (born 11 December 1992 in Montargis, Loiret) is a French athlete specialising in the shot put. He won the U23 category at the 2014 European Cup Winter Throwing.

His personal bests in shot put are 20.75 metres outdoors (Angers 2021, national record) and 20.36 metres indoors (Nice 2018).

== International competitions ==
Year	Competition	Venue	Position	Event	Notes
Representing France
2009	World Youth Championships	Brixen, Italy	17th (q)	Shot put (5 kg)	18.03 m
2010	World Junior Championships	Moncton, Canada	8th	Shot put (6 kg)	18.49 m
2011	European Junior Championships	Tallinn, Estonia	6th	Shot put (6 kg)	19.53 m
2013	Jeux de la Francophonie	Nice, France	8th	Shot put	17.08 m
2014	European Cup Winter Throwing (U23)	Leiria, Portugal	1st	Shot put	19.05 m
2014	Mediterranean U23 Championships	Aubagne, France	3rd	Shot put	18.22 m
2017	European Indoor Championships	Belgrade, Serbia	10th (q)	Shot put	19.97 m
2018	World Cup	London, United Kingdom	5th	Shot put	19.62 m
2018	European Championships	Berlin, Germany	17th (q)	Shot put	19.56 m
