= Athletics at the 2007 Games of the Small States of Europe =

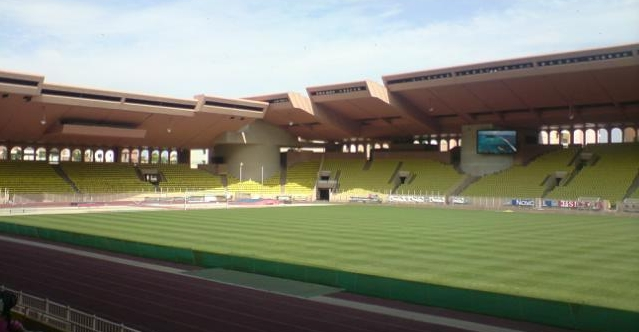
- Host stadium in Monaco
- Dates: 4 – 9 June
- Host city: Fontvieille, Monaco
- Venue: Stade Louis II
- Events: 34
- Participation: 164 athletes from 8 nations

Athletics competition at the 2007 Games of the Small States of Europe was held from 4–9 June 2007 in Fontvieille, Monaco, at Stade Louis II.

== Medal summary ==
=== Men ===
Event	Gold		Silver		Bronze	
100 metres	Prodromos Katsantonis (CYP)	10.66	Darren Gilford (MLT)	10.69	Daniel Abenzoar-Foulé (LUX)	10.71
200 metres	Daniel Abenzoar-Foulé (LUX)	21.42	Ioannis Georgallis (CYP)	21.66	Sveinn Elías Elíasson (ISL)	21.83
400 metres	Stephanos Hadjinicolaou (CYP)	47.94	Marios Mardas (CYP)	48.02	Nikolai Portelli (MLT)	48.72
800 metres	Brice Etès (MON)	1:51.29	Víctor Martínez (AND)	1:52.47	David Karonei (LUX)	1:53.18
1500 metres	Brice Etès (MON)	3:53.95	Mike Schumacher (LUX)	3:53.96	Christian Thielen (LUX)	3:55.15
5000 metres	Toni Bernadó (AND)	14:17.08	Kári Steinn Karlsson (ISL)	14:22.29	Marcos Sanza (AND)	14:32.71
10,000 metres	Zouahir Ouardi (MON)	30:05.67	Toni Bernadó (AND)	30:12.61	Kári Steinn Karlsson (ISL)	30:40.37
110 metres hurdles	Stefanos Ioannou (CYP)	13.92	Panagiotis Ioannou (CYP)	14.00	Claude Godart (LUX)	14.02
400 metres hurdles	Sveinn Elías Elíasson (ISL)	53.54	Kostas Pochanis (CYP)	53.87	Panagiotis Yiapatos (CYP)	55.08
3000 metres steeplechase	Zouahir Ouardi (MON)	9:04.27	Panagiotis Kyprianou (CYP)	9:07.88	Roger Königs (LUX)	9:21.17
4 x 100 metres relay	Cyprus; Stefanos Ioannou; Panagiotis Ioannou; Ioannis Georgallis; Prodromos Katsantonis	40.69	Malta; Nicolai Portelli; Rachid Chouhal; Mario Bonello; Darren Gilford	41.08	Iceland; Óli Tómas Freysson; Arnór Jónsson; Sveinn Elías Elíasson; Thorsteinn Ingvarsson	41.37
4 x 400 metres relay	Cyprus; Panagiotis Yiapotos; Konstantini Konstantinou; Marios Mardas; Stephanos Hadjinicolaou	3:12.86	Iceland; Halldór Lárusson; Thorsteinn Ingvarsson; Einar Dadi Larusson; Sveinn Elías Elíasson	3:18.06	Luxembourg; Yoann Bebon; David Karonei; Patrick Hansen; Claude Godart	3:18.65
Pole vault	Stefanos Demosthenous (CYP)	4.90	Mike Gira (LUX)	4.80	Nikandros Stylianou (CYP)	4.70
Long jump	Andrei Mikhalkevitch (LUX)	7.43	Patrick Hansen (LUX)	7.35	Rachid Chouhal (MLT)	7.26
Triple jump	Andrei Mikhalkevitch (LUX)	15.29	Chrysovalantis Theouli (CYP)	15.28	Patrick Hansen (LUX)	14.84
Javelin throw	René Michlig (LIE)	71.68	Moïse Louisy-Louis (MON)	68.80	Ioannis Stylianou (CYP)	68.15

=== Women ===
Event	Gold		Silver		Bronze	
100 metres	Eleni Artymata (CYP)	11.58	Charlene Attard (MLT)	11.97	Melina Menelaou (CYP)	12.26
200 metres	Eleni Artymata (CYP)	23.39	Alissa Kallinikou (CYP)	24.05	Charlene Attard (MLT)	24.54
400 metres	Alissa Kallinikou (CYP)	53.54	Francesca Xuereb (MLT)	55.72	Martina Xuereb (MLT)	56.48
800 metres	Stella Christoforou (CYP)	2:13.44	Caroline Mangion (MON)	2:13.97	Nancy Reuland (LUX)	2:14.34
1500 metres	Marilena Sofokleous (CYP)	4:28.86	Elpida Christodoulidou (CYP)	2:13.97	Caroline Mangion (MON)	2:14.34
5000 metres	Elpida Christodoulidou (CYP)	17:16.58	Pascale Schmoetten (LUX)	17:18.09	Frida Run Thordardottir (ISL)	17:21.45
10,000 metres	Frida Run Thordardottir (ISL)	36:23.79	Pascale Schmoetten (LUX)	37:21.97	Carol Walsh-Galea (MLT)	37:31.07
100 metres hurdles	Polyxeni Irodotou (CYP)	14.20	Martine Bomb (LUX)	14.38	Mandy Charlet (LUX)	14.62
400 metres hurdles	Silja Úlfarsdóttir (ISL)	59.10	Martine Bomb (LUX)	1:00.72	Florence Baudet (MON)	1:01.31
4 x 100 metres relay	Cyprus; Despo Athanasiades; Melina Menelaou; Eve Menelaou; Eleni Artymata	46.45	Malta; Lara Scerri; Therese Mallia; Charlene Attard; Diane Borg	46.65	Iceland; Linda Björk Lárusdóttir; Sigurbjörg Olafsdóttir; Silja Úlfarsdóttir; Helga Margrét Þorsteinsdóttir	47.15
4 x 400 metres relay	Cyprus; Nikoleta Ignatiou; Gabriella Sofokleous; Anna Ramona Papaioannou; Alissa Kallinikou	3:45.17	Iceland; Stefanía Hákonardóttir; Helga Hardardóttir; Sigurbjörg Olafsdóttir; Silja Úlfarsdóttir	3:46.42	Malta; Diane Borg; Charlene Attard; Martina Xuereb; Francesca Xuereb	3:47.92
High jump	Ioulia Farmaka (CYP)	1.85	Savia Palate (CYP)	1.71	Liz Kuffer (LUX)	1.71
Pole vault	Anna Fitidou (CYP)	4.20	Þórey Edda Elísdóttir (ISL)	4.10	Gina Reuland (LUX)	3.50
Long jump	Nektaria Panagi (CYP)	5.81	Helga Margrét Þorsteinsdóttir (ISL)	5.77	Montserrat Pujol (AND)	5.58
Triple jump	Thomaida Polydorou (CYP)	12.74	Sonia Delprete (MON)	12.59	Panayiota Riga (CYP)	11.92
Shot put	Olympiada Menelaou (CYP)	14.43	Kim Schartz (LUX)	14.06	Zacharoula Georgiadou (CYP)	13.54
Discus throw	Alexandra Klatsia (CYP)	47.84	Ásdís Hjálmsdóttir (ISL)	46.73	Zacharoula Georgiadou (CYP)	46.08
Javelin throw	Alexandra Tsissiou (CYP)	54.48	Eleni Mavroudi (CYP)	46.17	Helga Margrét Þorsteinsdóttir (ISL)	42.41

== Men's results ==
=== 100 metres ===
Heats – June 5
Wind:
Heat 1: 0.0 m/s, Heat 2: -1.0 m/s

Rank	Heat	Name	Nationality	Time	Notes
1	2	Sébastien Gattuso	Monaco	10.64	Q
2	1	Prodromos Katsantonis	Cyprus	10.73	Q
3	1	Michel Arlanda	Monaco	10.78	Q
3	2	Andreas Pafitis	Cyprus	10.78	Q
5	2	Daniel Abenzoar-Foulé	Luxembourg	10.81	q
6	1	Darren Gilford	Malta	10.82	q
7	2	Sveinn Elías Elíasson	Iceland	10.94	q
8	2	José Aguilera	Andorra	10.98	q
9	1	Arnór Jónsson	Iceland	11.05	
10	1	Festus Geraldo	Luxembourg	11.05	
11	2	Neal Borg	Malta	11.17	
12	1	Ángel Miret	Andorra	11.27	

Final – June 5
Wind:
+0.5 m/s

Rank	Name	Nationality	Time	Notes
1st place, gold medalist(s)	Prodromos Katsantonis	Cyprus	10.66	
2nd place, silver medalist(s)	Darren Gilford	Malta	10.69	
3rd place, bronze medalist(s)	Daniel Abenzoar-Foulé	Luxembourg	10.71	
4	Michel Arlanda	Monaco	10.72	
5	Andreas Pafitis	Cyprus	10.74	
6	Sébastien Gattuso	Monaco	10.76	
7	José Aguilera	Andorra	10.90	
8	Sveinn Elías Elíasson	Iceland	10.97	

=== 200 metres ===
June 9
Wind: +0.3 m/s

Rank	Name	Nationality	Time	Notes
1st place, gold medalist(s)	Daniel Abenzoar-Foulé	Luxembourg	21.42	
2nd place, silver medalist(s)	Ioannis Giorgallis	Cyprus	21.66	
3rd place, bronze medalist(s)	Sveinn Elías Elíasson	Iceland	21.83	
4	José Aguilera	Andorra	21.91	
5	Darren Gilford	Malta	22.11	
6	Arnór Jónsson	Iceland	22.87	
	Mario Bonello	Malta	DQ	
	Andreas Pafitis	Cyprus	DNS	

=== 400 metres ===
Heats – June 5

Rank	Heat	Name	Nationality	Time	Notes
1	2	Marios Mardas	Cyprus	48.71	Q
2	1	Stephanos Hadjinicolaou	Cyprus	48.83	Q
3	2	Nikolai Portelli	Malta	48.93	Q
4	1	Ivano Bucci	San Marino	49.30	Q
5	2	Yoann Bebon	Luxembourg	49.36	q
6	1	Einar Dadi Larusson	Iceland	50.14	q
7	1	Mario Debono	Malta	50.16	q
8	1	Jeff Reuter	Luxembourg	50.93	q
9	2	Marc De Marino	Monaco	51.13	
10	1	Florent Battistel	Monaco	51.23	
	2	Sveinn Elías Elíasson	Iceland	DNS	

Final – June 7

Rank	Name	Nationality	Time	Notes
1st place, gold medalist(s)	Stephanos Hadjinicolaou	Cyprus	47.94	
2nd place, silver medalist(s)	Marios Mardas	Cyprus	48.02	
3rd place, bronze medalist(s)	Nikolai Portelli	Malta	48.72	
4	Ivano Bucci	San Marino	48.96	
5	Yoann Bebon	Luxembourg	48.98	
6	Einar Dadi Larusson	Iceland	49.52	
7	Mario Debono	Malta	50.07	
8	Jeff Reuter	Luxembourg	50.43	

=== 800 metres ===
June 5

Rank	Name	Nationality	Time	Notes
1st place, gold medalist(s)	Brice Etès	Monaco	1:51.29	
2nd place, silver medalist(s)	Víctor Martínez	Andorra	1:52.37	
3rd place, bronze medalist(s)	David Karonei	Luxembourg	1:53.18	
4	Mario Debono	Malta	1:53.32	
5	Dimitris Filippou	Cyprus	1:53.92	
6	François Kauffman	Luxembourg	1:54.04	
7	Neofytos Lemonaris	Cyprus	1:54.30	
8	Sigurbjörn Arngrímsson	Iceland	1:55.97	
9	Mark Herrera	Malta	1:57.55	
10	Rémy Charpentier	Monaco	1:57.78	

=== 1500 metres ===
June 5

Rank	Name	Nationality	Time	Notes
1st place, gold medalist(s)	Brice Etès	Monaco	3:53.95	
2nd place, silver medalist(s)	Mike Schumacher	Luxembourg	3:53.96	
3rd place, bronze medalist(s)	Christian Thielen	Luxembourg	3:55.15	
4	Víctor Martínez	Andorra	3:55.15	
5	Sigurbjörn Arngrímsson	Iceland	3:58.63	
6	Kais Adli	Monaco	4:00.00	
7	Mark Herrera	Malta	4:00.31	
8	Neofytos Lemonaris	Cyprus	4:04.99	

=== 5000 metres ===
June 5

Rank	Name	Nationality	Time	Notes
1st place, gold medalist(s)	Toni Bernadó	Andorra	14:17.08	GR
2nd place, silver medalist(s)	Kári Steinn Karlsson	Iceland	14:22.29	
3rd place, bronze medalist(s)	Marcos Sanza	Andorra	14:32.71	
4	Vincent Nothum	Luxembourg	15:29.06	
5	Marcel Tschopp	Liechtenstein	15:41.58	
6	Antoine Berlin	Monaco	16:45.62	
	Jean-Marc Léandro	Monaco	DNF	
	Panagiotis Kyprianou	Cyprus	DNF	

=== 10,000 metres ===
June 9

Rank	Name	Nationality	Time	Notes
1st place, gold medalist(s)	Zouahir Ouardi	Monaco	30:05.67	
2nd place, silver medalist(s)	Toni Bernadó	Andorra	30:12.61	
3rd place, bronze medalist(s)	Kári Steinn Karlsson	Iceland	30:40.37	
4	Pascal Groben	Luxembourg	31:14.75	
5	Vincent Nothum	Luxembourg	31:32.98	
6	Marcel Tschopp	Liechtenstein	32:32.81	
	Manuel Alves	Andorra	DNF	
	Jean-Marc Léandro	Monaco	DNF	
	Stefan Gudmundsson	Iceland	DNF	

=== 110 metres hurdles ===
June 7
Wind: -0.4 m/s

Rank	Name	Nationality	Time	Notes
1st place, gold medalist(s)	Stefanos Ioannou	Cyprus	13.92	
2nd place, silver medalist(s)	Panagiotis Ioannou	Cyprus	14.00	
3rd place, bronze medalist(s)	Claude Godart	Luxembourg	14.02	
4	Þorsteinn Ingvarsson	Iceland	15.20	
5	Julien Hirtzig	Monaco	15.28	
6	Moïse Louisy-Louis	Monaco	15.35	
7	Einar Daði Lárusson	Iceland	15.36	

=== 400 metres hurdles ===
June 7

Rank	Name	Nationality	Time	Notes
1st place, gold medalist(s)	Sveinn Elías Elíasson	Iceland	53.54	
2nd place, silver medalist(s)	Kostas Pochanis	Cyprus	53.87	
3rd place, bronze medalist(s)	Panagiotis Yiapatos	Cyprus	55.08	
4	Anthony Jarrier-Martin	Monaco	56.85	

=== 3000 metres steeplechase ===
June 7

Rank	Name	Nationality	Time	Notes
1st place, gold medalist(s)	Zouahir Ouardi	Monaco	9:04.27	
2nd place, silver medalist(s)	Panagiotis Kyprianou	Cyprus	9:07.88	
3rd place, bronze medalist(s)	Roger Koenigs	Luxembourg	9:21.17	
4	Stefan Gudmundsson	Iceland	9:22.77	
5	Jamal Baaziz	Monaco	9:34.99	
6	Sofoklis Sofokleous	Cyprus	9:46.43	
	Josep Sansa	Andorra	DNF	

=== 4 x 100 meters relay ===
June 9

Rank	Nation	Competitors	Time	Notes
1st place, gold medalist(s)	Cyprus	Stefanos Ioannou, Panagiotis Ioannou, Ioannis Giorgallis, Prodromos Katsantonis	40.69	
2nd place, silver medalist(s)	Malta	Nikolai Portelli, Rachid Chouhal, Mario Bonello, Darren Gilford	41.08	
3rd place, bronze medalist(s)	Iceland	Óli Tómas Freysson, Arnór Jónsson, Sveinn Elías Elíasson, Thorsteinn Ingvarsson	41.37	
4	San Marino	Marcello Carattoni, Federico Gorrieri, Fabrizio Righi, Ivano Bucci	42.48	
5	Monaco	Anthony De Sevelinges, Sébastien Gattuso, Moïse Louisy-Louis, Michel Arlanda	42.52	
6	Andorra	José Aguilera, Ángel Miret, Oriol Guillem, Marc Medina	43.06	
	Luxembourg	Festus Geraldo, Daniel Abenzoar-Foulé, Patrick Hansen, Yoann Bebon	DNF	

=== 4 x 400 meters relay ===
June 9

Rank	Nation	Competitors	Time	Notes
1st place, gold medalist(s)	Cyprus	Panagiotis Yiapotos, Konstantini Konstantinou, Marios Mardas, Stephanos Hadjinicolaou	3:12.86	
2nd place, silver medalist(s)	Iceland	Halldór Lárusson, Thorsteinn Ingvarsson, Einar Dadi Larusson, Sveinn Elías Elíasson	3:18.06	
3rd place, bronze medalist(s)	Luxembourg	Yoann Bebon, David Karonei, Patrick Hansen, Claude Godart	3:18.65	
4	Monaco	Marc De Marino, Florent Battistel, Rémy Charpentier, Brice Etès	3:18.82	
5	Malta	Karl Farrugia, Mario Bonello, Mario Debono, Nikolai Portelli	3:18.90	
6	San Marino	Fabrizio Righi, Marcello Carattoni, Federico Gorrieri, Ivano Bucci	3:24.00	

=== Pole vault ===
June 5

Rank	Athlete	Nationality	3.60	3.80	4.00	4.20	4.30	4.40	4.50	4.60	4.70	4.80	4.90	5.10	Result	Notes
1st place, gold medalist(s)	Stefanos Demosthenous	Cyprus	–	–	–	–	–	–	–	xxo	o	xo	xo	xxx	4.90	
2nd place, silver medalist(s)	Mike Gira	Luxembourg	–	–	–	–	–	o	–	o	xxo	o	xxx		4.80	
3rd place, bronze medalist(s)	Nikandros Stylianou	Cyprus	–	–	–	–	–	o	–	o	o	xxx			4.70	
4	Laurent Pater	Luxembourg	–	–	–	–	o	–	xo	o	o	x			4.70	
5	Bernat Vilella	Andorra	–	–	–	–	o	–	xo	xxo	xxx				4.60	
6	Sveinn Elías Elíasson	Iceland	o	xo	–	xo	xxx								4.20	
7	Nourredine Metiri	Monaco	–	–	o	xxx									4.00	
8	Þorsteinn Ingvarsson	Iceland	o	xxx											3.60	

=== Long jump ===
June 7

Rank	Athlete	Nationality	Result	Notes
1st place, gold medalist(s)	Andrei Mikhalkevitch	Luxembourg	7.43	
2nd place, silver medalist(s)	Patrick Hansen	Luxembourg	7.35	
3rd place, bronze medalist(s)	Rachid Chouhal	Malta	7.26	
4	Þorsteinn Ingvarsson	Iceland	7.17	
5	Konstantinos Proestos	Cyprus	7.09	
6	Halldór Lárusson	Iceland	6.85	
7	Filippo Gorrieri	San Marino	6.80	
8	Federico Gorrieri	San Marino	6.71	
9	Matthaios Volou	Cyprus	6.68	
10	Moïse Louisy-Louis	Monaco	6.62	
11	Anthony de Sevelinges	Monaco	6.59	

=== Triple jump ===
June 9

Rank	Athlete	Nationality	Result	Notes
1st place, gold medalist(s)	Andrei Mikhalkevitch	Luxembourg	15.29	
2nd place, silver medalist(s)	Chrysovalantis Theouli	Cyprus	15.28	
3rd place, bronze medalist(s)	Patrick Hansen	Luxembourg	14.84	
4	Federico Gorrieri	San Marino	14.42	
5	Rachid Chouhal	Malta	14.35	
6	Arnór Jónsson	Iceland	12.42	

=== Javelin throw ===
June 5

Rank	Athlete	Nationality	#1	#2	#3	#4	#5	#6	Result	Notes
1st place, gold medalist(s)	René Michlig	Liechtenstein	71.68	x	67.39	66.16	x	65.45	71.68	NR
2nd place, silver medalist(s)	Moïse Louisy-Louis	Monaco	66.22	66.89	65.00	x	64.92	68.80	68.80	
3rd place, bronze medalist(s)	Ioannis Stylianou	Cyprus	66.82	66.61	66.63	66.99	x	68.15	68.15	
4	Gabriele Mazza	San Marino	x	65.49	62.68	65.92	66.18	63.43	66.18	
5	Jean-Paul Callus	Malta	53.23	60.75	59.37	63.89	x	60.67	63.89	NR
6	Guðmundur Hólma Jónsson	Iceland	57.67	x	61.08	63.64	x	x	63.64	
7	Andrew Floudiotis	Cyprus	63.55	60.65	61.83	61.43	63.56	62.81	63.56	
8	Fannar Gíslason	Iceland	55.89	56.21	61.01	54.07	x	x	61.01	

== Women's results ==
=== 100 metres ===
June 5
Wind: +0.6 m/s

Rank	Name	Nationality	Time	Notes
1st place, gold medalist(s)	Eleni Artymata	Cyprus	11.58	
2nd place, silver medalist(s)	Charlene Attard	Malta	11.97	
3rd place, bronze medalist(s)	Melina Menelaou	Cyprus	12.26	
4	Sigurbjörg Olafsdóttir	Iceland	12.26	
5	Chantal Hayen	Luxembourg	12.26	
6	Diane Borg	Malta	12.46	
7	Helga Margrét Þorsteinsdóttir	Iceland	12.54	

=== 200 metres ===
June 9
Wind: +1.3 m/s

Rank	Name	Nationality	Time	Notes
1st place, gold medalist(s)	Eleni Artymata	Cyprus	23.39	
2nd place, silver medalist(s)	Alissa Kallinikou	Cyprus	24.05	
3rd place, bronze medalist(s)	Charlene Attard	Malta	24.54	
4	Silja Úlfarsdóttir	Iceland	24.76	
5	Therese Mallia	Malta	25.20	
6	Sandra Frisch	Luxembourg	25.38	
7	Helga Margrét Þorsteinsdóttir	Iceland	25.43	

=== 400 metres ===
June 7

Rank	Name	Nationality	Time	Notes
1st place, gold medalist(s)	Alissa Kallinikou	Cyprus	53.54	
2nd place, silver medalist(s)	Francesca Xuereb	Malta	55.72	
3rd place, bronze medalist(s)	Martina Xuereb	Malta	56.48	
4	Martine Bomb	Luxembourg	56.67	
5	Irene Augier	Monaco	56.73	
6	Nikoleta Ignatiou	Cyprus	57.02	
7	Stefanía Hákonardóttir	Iceland	58.01	
8	Katrijn Van Damme	Luxembourg	59.95	

=== 800 metres ===
June 5

Rank	Name	Nationality	Time	Notes
1st place, gold medalist(s)	Stella Christoforou	Cyprus	2:13.44	
2nd place, silver medalist(s)	Caroline Mangion	Monaco	2:13.97	
3rd place, bronze medalist(s)	Nancy Reuland	Luxembourg	2:14.34	
4	Gabriella Sofokleous	Cyprus	2:15.13	
5	Stefanía Hákonardóttir	Iceland	2:16.04	
6	Helga Hardardóttir	Iceland	2:16.31	
7	Natalia Gallego	Andorra	2:17.98	

=== 1500 metres ===
June 7

Rank	Name	Nationality	Time	Notes
1st place, gold medalist(s)	Marilena Sofokleous	Cyprus	4:28.86	
2nd place, silver medalist(s)	Elpida Christodoulidou	Cyprus	4:34.18	
3rd place, bronze medalist(s)	Caroline Mangion	Monaco	4:34.75	
4	Iris Anna Skúladóttir	Iceland	4:39.08	
5	Natalia Gallego	Andorra	4:42.16	
6	Lisa Bezzina	Malta	4:46.01	
7	Silvia Felipo	Andorra	4:48.05	
8	Caroline Scavini	Monaco	4:52.74	

=== 5000 metres ===
June 9

Rank	Name	Nationality	Time	Notes
1st place, gold medalist(s)	Elpida Christodoulidou	Cyprus	17:16.58	
2nd place, silver medalist(s)	Pascale Schmoetten	Luxembourg	17:18.09	
3rd place, bronze medalist(s)	Frida Run Thordardottir	Iceland	17:21.45	
4	Iris Anna Skúladóttir	Iceland	17:43.53	
5	Marilena Sofokleous	Cyprus	18:05.28	
6	Silvia Felipo	Andorra	18:41.04	
7	Lisa Bezzina	Malta	18:58.10	
	Carol Walsh-Galea	Malta	DNF	

=== 10,000 metres ===
June 5

Rank	Name	Nationality	Time	Notes
1st place, gold medalist(s)	Frida Run Thordardottir	Iceland	36:23.79	
2nd place, silver medalist(s)	Pascale Schmoetten	Luxembourg	37:21.97	
3rd place, bronze medalist(s)	Carol Walsh-Galea	Malta	37:31.07	
4	Lisa Bezzina	Malta	38:52.03	
	Kerstin Metzler	Liechtenstein	DNF	

=== 100 metres hurdles ===
June 9
Wind: +1.4 m/s

Rank	Name	Nationality	Time	Notes
1st place, gold medalist(s)	Polyxeni Irodotou	Cyprus	14.20	
2nd place, silver medalist(s)	Martine Bomb	Luxembourg	14.38	
3rd place, bronze medalist(s)	Mandy Charlet	Luxembourg	14.62	
4	Helga Margrét Þorsteinsdóttir	Iceland	14.83	
5	Linda Björk Lárusdóttir	Iceland	15.50	

=== 400 metres hurdles ===
June 7

Rank	Name	Nationality	Time	Notes
1st place, gold medalist(s)	Silja Úlfarsdóttir	Iceland	59.10	GR
2nd place, silver medalist(s)	Martine Bomb	Luxembourg	1:00.72	
3rd place, bronze medalist(s)	Florence Baudet	Monaco	1:01.31	
4	Anna Ramona Papaioannou	Cyprus	1:02.29	
5	Mandy Charlet	Luxembourg	1:03.36	
6	Polyxeni Irodotou	Cyprus	1:03.73	

=== 4 x 100 meters relay ===
June 9

Rank	Nation	Competitors	Time	Notes
1st place, gold medalist(s)	Cyprus	Despo Athanasiades, Melina Menelaou, Eve Menelaou, Eleni Artymata	46.45	
2nd place, silver medalist(s)	Malta	Lara Scerri, Therese Mallia, Charlene Attard, Diane Borg	46.65	
3rd place, bronze medalist(s)	Iceland	Linda Björk Lárusdóttir, Sigurbjörg Olafsdóttir, Silja Úlfarsdóttir, Helga Margrét Þorsteinsdóttir	47.15	
4	Luxembourg	Chantal Hayen, Kim Schartz, Martine Bomb, Sandra Frisch	47.46	
5	San Marino	Eleonora Rossi, Barbara Rustignoli, Sara Maroncelli, Martina Pretelli	49.96	

=== 4 x 400 meters relay ===
June 9

Rank	Nation	Competitors	Time	Notes
1st place, gold medalist(s)	Cyprus	Nikoleta Ignatiou, Gabriella Sofokleous, Anna Ramona Papaioannou, Alissa Kallinikou	3:45.17	
2nd place, silver medalist(s)	Iceland	Stefanía Hákonardóttir, Helga Hardardóttir, Sigurbjörg Olafsdóttir, Silja Úlfarsdóttir	3:46.42	
3rd place, bronze medalist(s)	Malta	Diane Borg, Charlene Attard, Martina Xuereb, Francesca Xuereb	3:47.92	
4	Monaco	Sonia Delprete, Caroline Mangion, Florence Baudet, Irene Augier	3:48.94	
5	Luxembourg	Carole Frisch, Nancy Reuland, Mandy Charlet, Martine Bomb	3:49.15	

=== High jump ===
June 9

Rank	Athlete	Nationality	Result	Notes
1st place, gold medalist(s)	Ioulia Farmaka	Cyprus	1.85	
2nd place, silver medalist(s)	Savia Palate	Cyprus	1.71	
3rd place, bronze medalist(s)	Liz Kuffer	Luxembourg	1.71	
4	Tammy Kieffer	Luxembourg	1.68	
5	Sonia Delprete	Monaco	1.68	
6	Margarida Moreno	Andorra	1.65	
7	Ágústa Tryggvadóttir	Iceland	1.65	
8	Milena Tura	San Marino	1.60	
9	Barbara Rustignoli	San Marino	1.55	

=== Pole vault ===
June 7

Rank	Athlete	Nationality	Result	Notes
1st place, gold medalist(s)	Anna Fitidou	Cyprus	4.20	
2nd place, silver medalist(s)	Þórey Edda Elísdóttir	Iceland	4.10	
3rd place, bronze medalist(s)	Gina Reuland	Luxembourg	3.50	
4	Stephanie Vieillevoye	Luxembourg	3.50	
5	Eleonora Rossi	San Marino	3.20	

=== Long jump ===
June 7

Rank	Athlete	Nationality	Result	Notes
1st place, gold medalist(s)	Nektaria Panagi	Cyprus	5.81	
2nd place, silver medalist(s)	Helga Margrét Þorsteinsdóttir	Iceland	5.77	
3rd place, bronze medalist(s)	Montserrat Pujol	Andorra	5.58	
4	Sonia Delprete	Monaco	5.48	
5	Barbara Rustignoli	San Marino	5.48	
6	Thomaida Polydorou	Cyprus	5.41	
7	Ágústa Tryggvadóttir	Iceland	5.29	

=== Triple jump ===
June 5

Rank	Athlete	Nationality	#1	#2	#3	#4	#5	#6	Result	Notes
1st place, gold medalist(s)	Thomaida Polydorou	Cyprus	12.60	12.48	12.58	12.74	12.29	x	12.74	
2nd place, silver medalist(s)	Sonia Delprete	Monaco	12.48	12.57	12.59	x	12.12	12.27	12.59	
3rd place, bronze medalist(s)	Panayiota Riga	Cyprus	11.72w	x	x	11.86	x	11.92	11.92	
4	Montserrat Pujol	Andorra	x	x	11.85w	11.67	11.83	11.91	11.91	
5	Ágústa Tryggvadóttir	Iceland	11.40	x	x	11.18	11.46	x	11.46	

=== Shot put ===
June 9

Rank	Athlete	Nationality	Result	Notes
1st place, gold medalist(s)	Olympia Menelaou	Cyprus	14.43	
2nd place, silver medalist(s)	Kim Schartz	Luxembourg	14.06	NR
3rd place, bronze medalist(s)	Zacharoula Georgiadou	Cyprus	13.54	
4	Helga Margrét Þorsteinsdóttir	Iceland	12.63	
5	Vanessa Bignoli	Luxembourg	11.99	
6	Antonella Chouhal	Malta	10.26	

=== Discus throw ===
June 7

Rank	Athlete	Nationality	Result	Notes
1st place, gold medalist(s)	Alexandra Klatsia	Cyprus	47.84	
2nd place, silver medalist(s)	Ásdís Hjálmsdóttir	Iceland	46.73	
3rd place, bronze medalist(s)	Zacharoula Georgiadou	Cyprus	46.08	
4	Vanessa Bignoli	Luxembourg	39.67	
5	Antonella Chouhal	Malta	36.88	

=== Javelin throw ===
June 5

Rank	Athlete	Nationality	#1	#2	#3	#4	#5	#6	Result	Notes
1st place, gold medalist(s)	Alexandra Tsissiou	Cyprus	54.48	x	51.90	53.89	x	x	54.48	
2nd place, silver medalist(s)	Eleni Mavroudi	Cyprus	43.49	43.64	43.62	44.60	46.17	45.00	46.17	
3rd place, bronze medalist(s)	Helga Margrét Þorsteinsdóttir	Iceland	x	x	37.67	42.41	41.18	x	42.41	
4	Olivia Giesecke	Monaco	34.29	35.13	38.43	x	36.36	36.43	38.43	
5	Sonia Delprete	Monaco	31.59	–	–	–	–	–	31.59	

== Medal table ==
Rank	Nation	Gold	Silver	Bronze	Total
1	Cyprus	22	10	7	39
2	Monaco	4	3	2	9
3	Luxembourg	3	8	11	22
4	Iceland	3	6	6	15
5	Andorra	1	2	2	5
6	Liechtenstein	1	0	0	1
7	Malta	0	5	6	11
8	San Marino	0	0	0	0
Totals (8 entries)		34	34	34	102

== Participating nations ==
- Andorra (14)
- Cyprus (44)
- Iceland (22)
- Liechtenstein (3)
- Luxembourg (30)
- Malta (18)
- Monaco (22) (Host team)
- San Marino (11)
