= Athletics at the 2005 Games of the Small States of Europe =

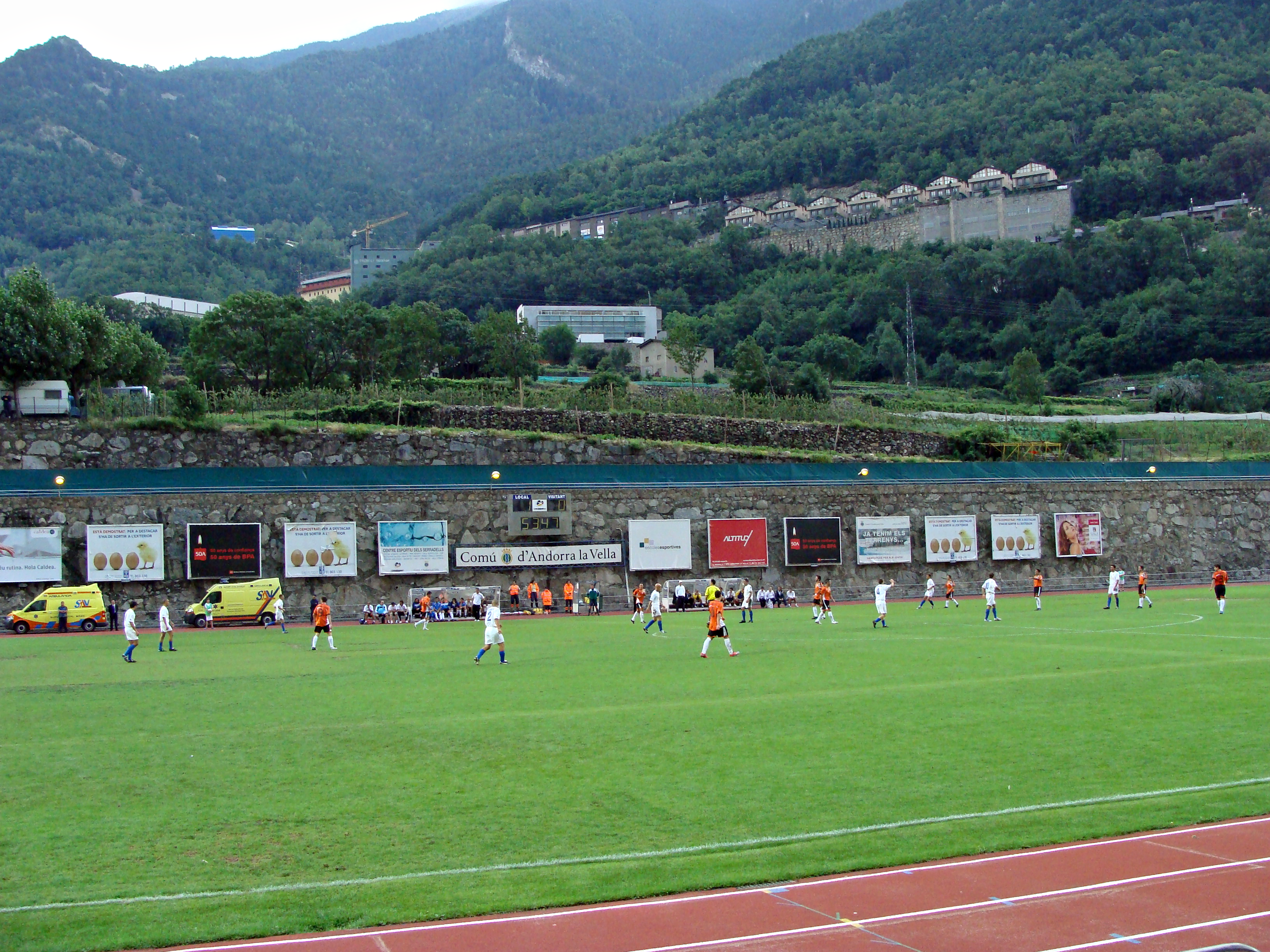
- Dates: 30 May – 4 June
- Host city: Andorra la Vella, Andorra
- Venue: Estadi Comunal d'Andorra la Vella
- Events: 37
- Participation: 164 athletes from 8 nations

Athletics at the 2005 Games of the Small States of Europe were held at the Estadi Comunal in Andorra la Vella, Andorra between 30 May – 4 June.

The event took place at altitude which is believed to have a positive effect on the performance in some events.

== Medal summary ==
=== Men ===
Event	Gold		Silver		Bronze	
100 metres	Daniel Abenzoar-Foulé (LUX)	10.42	Michael Neophytou (CYP)	10.61	Darren Gilford (MLT)	10.63
200 metres	Daniel Abenzoar-Foulé (LUX)	21.38	Michael Neophytou (CYP)	21.91	Mario Bonello (MLT)	21.95
400 metres	Johan Mordijck (LUX)	48.23	Marios Mardas (CYP)	48.39	Nikolai Portelli (MLT)	48.66
800 metres	Brice Etes (MON)	1:54.71	Víctor Martínez (AND)	1:55.40	Zafer Sukuşu (CYP)	1:55.57
1500 metres	Víctor Martínez (AND)	3:58.01	Christian Thielen (LUX)	3:58.36	Zafer Sukuşu (CYP)	3:59.32
5000 metres	Toni Bernadó (AND)	14:39.46	Mustapha Tantan (MON)	14:58.97	Alexandros Kalogerogiannis (CYP)	15:05.86
10,000 metres	Mustapha Tantan (MON)	31:30.69	Toni Bernadó (AND)	31:40.85	Thierry Hübsch (LUX)	32:24.37
110 metres hurdles	Claude Godart (LUX)	14.54	Jón Arnar Magnússon (ISL)	15.13	Ólafur Guðmundsson (ISL)	15.37
400 metres hurdles	Björgvin Víkingsson (ISL)	53.49	Constantinos Constantinou (CYP)	53.86	Ioannis Kostikiadis (CYP)	54.21
3000 metres steeplechase	Pascal Groben (LUX)	9:15.1	Josep Sansa (AND)	9:17.6	Jamal Baaziz (MON)	9:34.1
4 × 100 metres relay	Malta; Mario Bonello; Rachid Chouhal; Darren Gilford; Jeandre Mallia	40.63	Luxembourg; Johan Mordijck; Daniel Abenzoar-Foulé; Claude Godart; Christian Kemp	41.32	Iceland; Þorsteinn Ingvarsson; Ólafur Guðmundsson; Halldór Lárusson; Jón Arnar Magnússon	42.90
4 × 400 metres relay	Cyprus; Prokopis Andreou; Marios Mardas; Stefanos Nearchou; Christos Christou	3:15.85	Malta; Mario Bonello; Ivan Borg; Karl Farrugia; Nikolai Portelli	3:18.74	San Marino; Ivano Bucci; Luca Buscarini; Glauco Martini; Fabrizio Righi	3:20.33
High jump	Kyriakos Ioannou (CYP)	2.18	Ioannis Constantinou (CYP)	2.15	Asmir Mirascic (LUX)	2.03
Pole vault	Stefanos Demosthenous (CYP)	5.00	Bernat Vilella (AND); Laurent Pater (LUX)	4.70	Not awarded	
Long jump	Andrei Mikhalkevitch (LUX)	7.62	Rachid Chouhal (MLT)	7.61	Jón Arnar Magnússon (ISL)	7.30
Triple jump	Panayotis Papavarnavas (CYP)	15.11	Rachid Chouhal (MLT)	14.57	Þorstein Ingvarsson (ISL)	14.43
Shot put	Óðinn Björn Þorsteinsson (ISL)	17.15	Georges Aresti (CYP)	16.26	Petros Mitsides (CYP)	16.06
Discus throw	Georges Aresti (CYP)	53.70	Óðinn Björn Þorsteinsson (ISL)	51.23	Petros Mitsides (CYP)	50.82
Javelin throw	Ioannis Stylianou (CYP)	64.06	Moïse Louisy-Louis (MON)	58.75	Jean-Paul Callus (MLT)	58.12

=== Women ===
Event	Gold		Silver		Bronze	
100 metres	Eleni Artymata (CYP)	11.67	Marilia Grigoriou (CYP)	11.79	Chantal Hayen (LUX)	12.03
200 metres	Eleni Artymata (CYP)	23.98	Marilia Grigoriou (CYP)	23.99	Charlene Attard (MLT)	25.14
400 metres	Alissa Kallinikou (CYP)	55.04	Martina Xuereb (MLT)	57.89	Ramona Papaioannou (CYP)	58.10
800 metres	Anny Christofidou (CYP)	2:09.57	Gavriela Sofokleous (CYP)	2:12.10	Lisa Bezzina (MLT)	2:16.76
1500 metres	Anna Christofidou (CYP)	4:31.27	Gavriela Sofokleous (CYP)	4:38.25	Íris Anna Skúladóttir (ISL)	4:45.28
5000 metres	Íris Anna Skúladóttir (ISL)	17:55.39	Carol Galea (MLT)	17:58.66	Fríða Rún Þórðardóttir (ISL)	18:15.70
10,000 metres	Carol Galea (MLT)	37:40.36	Lisa Bezzina (MLT)	38:35.51	Fríða Rún Þórðardóttir (ISL)	38:49.87
100 metres hurdles	Morfo Baourda (CYP)	14.05	Kim Reuland (LUX)	14.48	Mandy Charlet (LUX)	14.77
4 × 100 metres relay	Cyprus; Morfo Paourda; Melini Hadjitheori; Eleni Artymata; Melin Menelaou	45.40	Malta; Charlene Attard; Diane Borg; Therese Mallia; Lara Scerri	47.21	Luxembourg; Chantal Hayen; Kim Reuland; Laurence Kipgen; Sandra Frisch	47.48
4 × 400 metres relay	Cyprus; Anne Christofidou; Gavriela Sofokleous; Nikoletta Ignatiou; Alissa Kalinikou	3:49.15	Malta; Charlene Attard; Diane Borg; Lara Scerri; Martina Xuereb	3:50.29	Luxembourg; Mandy Charlet; Carole Frisch; Katrijn Van Damme; Kim Reuland	3:55.86
High jump	Ioulia Farmaka (CYP)	1.75	Tammy Kieffer (LUX)	1.65	Margarita Proestou (CYP)	1.65
Pole vault	Þórey Edda Elísdóttir (ISL)	4.40	Anna Fitidou (CYP)	4.10	Stéphanie Vieillevoye (LUX)	3.20
Long jump	Irene Charalambous (CYP)	6.17	Rebecca Camilleri (MLT)	5.94	Montserrat Pujol (AND)	5.75
Triple jump	Maria Diikiti (CYP)	12.82	Montserrat Pujol (AND)	12.20	Jóhanna Ingadóttir (ISL)	11.61
Shot put	Christina Strovolidou (CYP)	14.07	Kim Schartz (LUX)	13.69	Ásdís Hjálmsdóttir (ISL)	12.74
Discus throw	Ásdís Hjálmsdóttir (ISL)	46.07	Alexandra Klatsia (CYP)	44.41	Charikilia Odysseos (CYP)	42.28
Hammer throw	Paraskevi Theodorou (CYP)	53.09	Vilborg Jóhannsdóttir (ISL)	37.10	Elena Villalón (AND)	36.24
Javelin throw	Ásdís Hjálmsdóttir (ISL)	57.05	Vigdís Guðjónsdóttir (ISL)	52.68	Eleni Mavroudi (CYP)	46.67

== Men's results ==
=== 100 metres ===
Heats – May 31
Wind:
Heat 1: -1.2 m/s, Heat 2: 0.0 m/s

Rank	Heat	Name	Nationality	Time	Notes
1	2	Daniel Abenzoar-Foulé	Luxembourg	10.57	Q
2	2	Michael Neophytou	Cyprus	10.69	Q
3	2	Michel Arlanda	Monaco	10.73	q
4	1	Sébastien Gattuso	Monaco	10.77	Q
5	1	Darren Gilford	Malta	10.78	Q
6	1	Ioannis Georgallis	Cyprus	10.80	q
7	2	Jeandre Mallia	Malta	10.95	
8	2	Halldór Lárusson	Iceland	11.29	
9	1	Þorsteinn Ingvarsson	Iceland	11.49	
10	2	Oriol Guillem	Andorra	11.66	

Final – May 31
Wind:
+0.3 m/s

Rank	Name	Nationality	Time	Notes
1st place, gold medalist(s)	Daniel Abenzoar-Foulé	Luxembourg	10.42	PB
2nd place, silver medalist(s)	Michael Neophytou	Cyprus	10.61	
3rd place, bronze medalist(s)	Darren Gilford	Malta	10.63	
4	Sébastien Gattuso	Monaco	10.66	
5	Ioannis Georgallis	Cyprus	10.70	
6	Michel Arlanda	Monaco	10.97	

=== 200 metres ===
June 4
Wind: -2.2 m/s

Rank	Name	Nationality	Time	Notes
1st place, gold medalist(s)	Daniel Abenzoar-Foulé	Luxembourg	21.38	
2nd place, silver medalist(s)	Michael Neophytou	Cyprus	21.91	
3rd place, bronze medalist(s)	Mario Bonello	Malta	21.95	
4	Ioannis Georgallis	Cyprus	22.13	
5	Halldór Lárusson	Iceland	23.18	
6	Rachid Chouhal	Malta	23.18	

=== 400 metres ===
Heats – May 31

Rank	Heat	Name	Nationality	Time	Notes
1	2	Johan Mordijck	Luxembourg	48.74	Q
2	1	Marios Mardas	Cyprus	49.47	Q
3	2	Christos Christou	Cyprus	49.70	Q
4	1	Nikolai Portelli	Malta	49.85	Q
5	2	Karl Farrugia	Malta	50.04	q
6	1	Florent Battistel	Monaco	50.08	q
7	1	Ivano Bucci	San Marino	50.08	
8	2	Björgvin Vikingsson	Iceland	50.50	
9	1	Jeff Reuter	Luxembourg	50.60	
10	2	Marc De Marino	Monaco	52.88	

Final – June 2

Rank	Name	Nationality	Time	Notes
1st place, gold medalist(s)	Johan Mordijck	Luxembourg	48.23	
2nd place, silver medalist(s)	Marios Mardas	Cyprus	48.39	
3rd place, bronze medalist(s)	Nikolai Portelli	Malta	48.66	
4	Christos Christou	Cyprus	49.17	
5	Karl Farrugia	Malta	49.76	
6	Florent Battistel	Monaco	50.00	

=== 800 metres ===
May 31

Rank	Name	Nationality	Time	Notes
1st place, gold medalist(s)	Brice Etès	Monaco	1:54.71	
2nd place, silver medalist(s)	Víctor Martínez	Andorra	1:55.40	
3rd place, bronze medalist(s)	Zafer Sukuşu	Cyprus	1:55.57	
4	Christian Thielen	Luxembourg	1:55.67	
5	Mike Schumacher	Luxembourg	1:56.12	
6	Gauti Jóhannesson	Iceland	1:56.91	
7	Angelos Ioannou	Cyprus	1:57.05	
8	Jean-Marc Leandro	Monaco	1:57.33	
9	Florian Hilti	Liechtenstein	1:57.38	
10	Mark Herrera	Malta	1:57.97	
11	Glauco Martini	San Marino	2:02.56	

=== 1500 metres ===
June 4

Rank	Name	Nationality	Time	Notes
1st place, gold medalist(s)	Víctor Martínez	Andorra	3:58.01	
2nd place, silver medalist(s)	Christian Thielen	Luxembourg	3:58.36	
3rd place, bronze medalist(s)	Zafer Sukuşu	Cyprus	3:59.32	
4	Jean-Marc Leandro	Monaco	3:59.82	
5	Josep Sansa	Andorra	4:02.14	
6	Mark Herrera	Malta	4:02.36	
7	Florian Hilti	Liechtenstein	4:03.69	
8	Kaïs Adli	Monaco	4:06.89	
9	Pascal Groben	Luxembourg	4:08.18	
10	Yiannakis Klenthous	Cyprus	4:09.19	

=== 5000 metres ===
June 4

Rank	Name	Nationality	Time	Notes
1st place, gold medalist(s)	Toni Bernadó	Andorra	14:39.49	
2nd place, silver medalist(s)	Mustapha Tantan	Monaco	14:58.97	
3rd place, bronze medalist(s)	Alexandros Kalogerogiannis	Cyprus	15:05.86	
4	Thierry Hübsch	Luxembourg	15:15.51	
5	Vincent Nothum	Luxembourg	15:21.91	
6	Stefan Guðmundsson	Iceland	15:31.07	
7	Kári Steinn Karlsson	Iceland	15:52.21	
	Joan Moya	Andorra	DNF	

=== 10,000 metres ===
May 31

Rank	Name	Nationality	Time	Notes
1st place, gold medalist(s)	Mustapha Tantan	Monaco	31:30.69	
2nd place, silver medalist(s)	Toni Bernadó	Andorra	31:40.85	
3rd place, bronze medalist(s)	Thierry Hübsch	Luxembourg	32:24.37	
4	Kári Steinn Karlsson	Iceland	33:21.64	
	Joan Moya	Andorra	DNF	

=== 110 metres hurdles ===
Heats – June 2
Wind:
Heat 1: -3.5 m/s, Heat 2: -3.2 m/s

Rank	Heat	Name	Nationality	Time	Notes
1	1	Claude Godart	Luxembourg	14.47	Q
2	1	Gregoris Georgiou	Cyprus	14.80	Q
3	1	Ólafur Guðmundsson	Iceland	15.52	q
4	2	Jón Arnar Magnússon	Iceland	16.25	Q
5	1	Sébastien Rousset	Monaco	16.54	q
	2	Sergi Raya	Andorra	DQ	
	2	Moïse Louisy-Louis	Monaco	DQ	

Final – June 4
Wind:
-3.8 m/s

Rank	Name	Nationality	Time	Notes
1st place, gold medalist(s)	Claude Godart	Luxembourg	14.54	
2nd place, silver medalist(s)	Jón Arnar Magnússon	Iceland	15.13	
3rd place, bronze medalist(s)	Ólafur Guðmundsson	Iceland	15.37	
	Sébastien Rousset	Monaco	DQ	
	Gregoris Georgiou	Cyprus	DQ	

=== 400 metres hurdles ===
June 2

Rank	Name	Nationality	Time	Notes
1st place, gold medalist(s)	Björgvin Vikingsson	Iceland	53.49	
2nd place, silver medalist(s)	Constantinos Constantinou	Cyprus	53.86	
3rd place, bronze medalist(s)	Ioannis Kostikiadis	Cyprus	54.21	
4	Marcello Carattoni	San Marino	57.93	

=== 3000 metres steeplechase ===
June 2

Rank	Name	Nationality	Time	Notes
1st place, gold medalist(s)	Pascal Groben	Luxembourg	9:15.1	
2nd place, silver medalist(s)	Josep Sansa	Andorra	9:17.6	
3rd place, bronze medalist(s)	Jamal Baaziz	Monaco	9:34.1	
4	Stefán Guðmundsson	Iceland	9:41.3	
	Joan Moya	Andorra	DNF	
	Panayiotis Kyprianou	Cyprus	DNF	

=== 4 x 100 metres relay ===
Heats – June 2

Rank	Heat	Nation	Competitors	Time	Notes
1	1	Malta	Mario Bonello, Darren Gilford, Rachid Chouhal, Jeandre Mallia	40.63	Q, NR
2	1	Cyprus	Michael Neophytou, Ioannis Georgallis, Christos Kaimakliotis, Georgio Lavinthis	40.69	Q
3	2	Luxembourg	Johan Mordijck, Daniel Abenzoar-Foulé, Claude Godart, Christian Kemp	41.22	Q
4	2	San Marino	Luca Buscarini, Marcello Carattoni, Federico Gorrieri, Fabrizio Righi	42.30	Q
5	1	Iceland	Þorsteinn Ingvarsson, Ólafur Guðmundsson, Halldór Lárusson, Jónas Hallgrímsson	42.40	q
6	2	Monaco	Michel Arlanda, Sébastien Gattuso, Sébastien Rousset, Frédéric Vidal	43.55	q
7	2	Andorra	Oriol Guillem, Josep Mazón, Bernat Vilella, Ignas Villamayor	44.58	

Final – June 4

Rank	Nation	Competitors	Time	Notes
1st place, gold medalist(s)	Malta	Mario Bonello, Rachid Chouhal, Darren Gilford, Jeandre Mallia	40.63	=NR
2nd place, silver medalist(s)	Luxembourg	Johan Mordijck, Daniel Abenzoar-Foulé, Claude Godart, Christian Kemp	41.32	
3rd place, bronze medalist(s)	Iceland	Þorsteinn Ingvarsson, Ólafur Guðmundsson, Halldór Lárusson, Jón Arnar Magnússon	42.90	
4	Monaco	Moise Louisy-Louis, Marc De Marino, Sébastien Rousset, Frédéric Vidal	43.93	
	San Marino	Luca Buscarini, Marcello Carattoni, Federico Gorrieri, Fabrizio Righi	DQ	
	Cyprus	Michael Neophytou, Ioannis Georgallis, Christos Kaimakliotis, Georgio Lavinthis	DQ	

=== 4 x 400 metres relay ===
June 4

Rank	Nation	Competitors	Time	Notes
1st place, gold medalist(s)	Cyprus	Prokopis Andreou, Marios Mardas, Stefanos Nearchou, Christos Christou	3:15.85	
2nd place, silver medalist(s)	Malta	Mario Bonello, Ivan Borg, Karl Farrugia, Nikolai Portelli	3:18.74	
3rd place, bronze medalist(s)	San Marino	Ivano Bucci, Luca Buscarini, Glauco Martini, Fabrizio Righi	3:20.33	
4	Monaco	Kaïs Adli, Florent Battistel, Brice Etès, Jean-Marc Leandro	3:21.66	
5	Iceland	Ólafur Guðmundsson, Halldór Lárusson, Jón Arnar Magnússon, Björgvin Vikingsson	3:23.79	
	Luxembourg	Raoul Petit, Johan Mordijck, Claude Godart, Daniel Abenzoar-Foulé	DQ	

=== High jump ===
June 2

Rank	Name	Nationality	Result	Notes
1st place, gold medalist(s)	Kyriacos Ioannou	Cyprus	2.18	
2nd place, silver medalist(s)	Ioannis Constantinou	Cyprus	2.15	
3rd place, bronze medalist(s)	Asmir Mirascic	Luxembourg	2.03	
4	Þorsteinn Ingvarsson	Iceland	1.80	

=== Pole vault ===
May 31

Rank	Name	Nationality	Result	Notes
1st place, gold medalist(s)	Stefanos Demosthenous	Cyprus	5.00	
2nd place, silver medalist(s)	Bernat Vilella	Andorra	4.70	
2nd place, silver medalist(s)	Laurent Pater	Luxembourg	4.70	
4	Jón Arnar Magnússon	Iceland	4.60	
5	Mike Gira	Luxembourg	4.30	
6	Xavier Consegal	Andorra	4.10	

=== Long jump ===
June 2

Rank	Name	Nationality	Result	Notes
1st place, gold medalist(s)	Andrei Mikhalkevitsch	Luxembourg	7.62	
2nd place, silver medalist(s)	Rachid Chouhal	Malta	7.61	
3rd place, bronze medalist(s)	Jón Arnar Magnússon	Iceland	7.30	
4	Luca Maccapani	San Marino	7.09	
5	Þorsteinn Ingvarsson	Iceland	7.02	
6	Federico Gorrieri	San Marino	6.99	
7	Moïse Louisy-Louis	Monaco	6.89	
8	Andreas Efstathiou	Cyprus	6.85	

=== Triple jump ===
June 4

Rank	Name	Nationality	Result	Notes
1st place, gold medalist(s)	Panayotis Papavarnavas	Cyprus	15.11	
2nd place, silver medalist(s)	Rachid Chouhal	Malta	14.57	NR
3rd place, bronze medalist(s)	Þorsteinn Ingvarsson	Iceland	14.43	
4	Federico Gorrieri	San Marino	14.30w	
5	Ólafur Guðmundsson	Iceland	14.29	

=== Shot put ===
June 2

Rank	Name	Nationality	Result	Notes
1st place, gold medalist(s)	Óðinn Björn Þorsteinsson	Iceland	17.15	
2nd place, silver medalist(s)	Georgios Arestis	Cyprus	16.26	
3rd place, bronze medalist(s)	Petros Mitsides	Cyprus	16.06	
4	Jón Arnar Magnússon	Iceland	15.25	
5	Ángel Moreno	Andorra	12.64	

=== Discus throw ===
May 31

Rank	Name	Nationality	Result	Notes
1st place, gold medalist(s)	Georgios Arestis	Cyprus	53.70	
2nd place, silver medalist(s)	Óðinn Björn Þorsteinsson	Iceland	51.23	
3rd place, bronze medalist(s)	Petros Mitsides	Cyprus	50.82	
4	Ángel Moreno	Andorra	43.80	

=== Javelin throw ===
June 4

Rank	Name	Nationality	Result	Notes
1st place, gold medalist(s)	Ioannis Stylianou	Cyprus	64.06	
2nd place, silver medalist(s)	Moïse Louisy-Louis	Monaco	58.75	
3rd place, bronze medalist(s)	Jean-Paul Callus	Malta	58.12	
4	Jón Arnar Magnússon	Iceland	56.96	
5	Adria Pérez	Andorra	51.83	

== Women's results ==
=== 100 metres ===
Heats – May 31
Wind:
Heat 1: 0.0 m/s, Heat 2: +1.7 m/s

Rank	Heat	Name	Nationality	Time	Notes
1	2	Marilia Grigoriou	Cyprus	11.83	Q
2	1	Eleni Artymata	Cyprus	11.90	Q
3	2	Chantal Hayen	Luxembourg	12.09	Q
4	2	Sigurbjörg Olafsdóttir	Iceland	12.21	q
5	1	Charlene Attard	Malta	12.35	Q
6	2	Therese Mallia	Malta	12.51	q
7	1	Sandra Frisch	Luxembourg	12.55	
8	1	Martina Walser	Liechtenstein	12.78	
9	1	Maïllis Bouchard	Monaco	12.91	
10	2	Roser Mazón	Andorra	13.13	

Final – May 31
Wind:
+0.1 m/s

Rank	Name	Nationality	Time	Notes
1st place, gold medalist(s)	Eleni Artymata	Cyprus	11.67	
2nd place, silver medalist(s)	Marilia Grigoriou	Cyprus	11.79	
3rd place, bronze medalist(s)	Chantal Hayen	Luxembourg	12.03	
4	Sigurbjörg Olafsdóttir	Iceland	12.05	
5	Charlene Attard	Malta	12.27	
6	Therese Mallia	Malta	12.32	

=== 200 metres ===
Heats – June 2
Wind:
Heat 1: -3.8 m/s, Heat 2: -4.1 m/s

Rank	Heat	Name	Nationality	Time	Notes
1	2	Marilia Grigoriou	Cyprus	24.43	Q
2	1	Eleni Artymata	Cyprus	24.52	Q
3	2	Charlene Attard	Malta	25.44	Q
4	1	Chantal Hayen	Luxembourg	25.53	Q
5	2	Sigurbjörg Olafsdóttir	Iceland	25.71	q
6	1	Therese Mallia	Malta	25.81	q
7	1	Martina Walser	Liechtenstein	25.91	
8	2	Sandra Frisch	Luxembourg	26.21	
9	1	Maïlis Bouchard	Monaco	26.84	
10	2	Roser Mazón	Andorra	27.61	

Final – June 4
Wind:
-3.3 m/s

Rank	Name	Nationality	Time	Notes
1st place, gold medalist(s)	Eleni Artymata	Cyprus	23.98	
2nd place, silver medalist(s)	Marilia Grigoriou	Cyprus	23.99	
3rd place, bronze medalist(s)	Charlene Attard	Malta	25.14	
4	Sigurbjörg Olafsdóttir	Iceland	25.16	
5	Chantal Hayen	Luxembourg	25.31	
6	Therese Mallia	Malta	25.73	

=== 400 metres ===
Heats – May 31

Rank	Heat	Name	Nationality	Time	Notes
1	2	Alissa Kallinikou	Cyprus	56.42	Q
2	1	Ramona Papaioannou	Cyprus	58.10	Q
3	2	Martina Xuereb	Malta	58.72	Q
4	1	Lara Scerri	Malta	58.75	Q
5	1	Kristín Birna Ólafsdóttir	Iceland	58.80	q
6	2	Lucille Maes	Monaco	59.66	q
7	2	Roser Mazón	Andorra	1:00.65	

Final – June 2

Rank	Name	Nationality	Time	Notes
1st place, gold medalist(s)	Alissa Kallinikou	Cyprus	55.04	
2nd place, silver medalist(s)	Martina Xuereb	Malta	57.89	
3rd place, bronze medalist(s)	Ramona Papaioannou	Cyprus	58.10	
4	Lara Scerri	Malta	58.44	
5	Kristín Birna Ólafsdóttir	Iceland	58.71	
6	Lucille Maes	Monaco	1:00.05	

=== 800 metres ===
May 31

Rank	Name	Nationality	Time	Notes
1st place, gold medalist(s)	Anny Christofidou	Cyprus	2:09.57	
2nd place, silver medalist(s)	Gavriela Sofokleous	Cyprus	2:12.10	
3rd place, bronze medalist(s)	Lisa Bezzina	Malta	2:16.76	
4	Eygerður Hafþórsdóttir	Iceland	2:17.81	
5	Natalia Gallego	Andorra	2:22.64	
6	Eva Iglesias	Andorra	2:25.96	

=== 1500 metres ===
June 2

Rank	Name	Nationality	Time	Notes
1st place, gold medalist(s)	Anny Christofidou	Cyprus	4:31.27	
2nd place, silver medalist(s)	Gavriela Sofokleous	Cyprus	4:38.25	
3rd place, bronze medalist(s)	Íris Anna Skúladóttir	Iceland	4:45.28	
4	Lisa Bezzina	Malta	4:49.93	
5	Maryse Scheller	Luxembourg	4:52.32	
6	Eygerður Hafþórsdóttir	Iceland	4:55.69	
7	Eva Iglesias	Andorra	5:00.98	

=== 5000 metres ===
May 31

Rank	Name	Nationality	Time	Notes
1st place, gold medalist(s)	Íris Anna Skúladóttir	Iceland	17:55.39	
2nd place, silver medalist(s)	Carol Galea	Malta	17:58.66	
3rd place, bronze medalist(s)	Fríða Rún Þórðardóttir	Iceland	18:15.70	
4	Silvia Felipo	Andorra	18:19.38	
5	Kerstin Mennenga	Liechtenstein	19:13.68	
	Mariana Weber	Monaco	DNF	

=== 10,000 metres ===
June 4

Rank	Name	Nationality	Time	Notes
1st place, gold medalist(s)	Carol Galea	Malta	37:40.36	
2nd place, silver medalist(s)	Lisa Bezzina	Malta	38:35.51	
3rd place, bronze medalist(s)	Fríða Rún Þórðardóttir	Iceland	38:49.87	
4	Silvia Felipo	Andorra	39:59.91	
5	Kerstin Mennenga	Liechtenstein	40:05.89	

=== 100 metres hurdles ===
June 4
Wind: -1.0 m/s

Rank	Name	Nationality	Time	Notes
1st place, gold medalist(s)	Morfo Baourda	Cyprus	14.05	
2nd place, silver medalist(s)	Kim Reuland	Luxembourg	14.48	
3rd place, bronze medalist(s)	Mandy Charlet	Luxembourg	14.77	
4	Kristín Birna Ólafsdóttir	Iceland	14.97	
5	Vilborg Jóhannsdóttir	Iceland	15.00	
6	Barbara Rustignoli	San Marino	15.49	

=== 4 x 100 metres relay ===
June 4

Rank	Nation	Competitors	Time	Notes
1st place, gold medalist(s)	Cyprus	Morfo Paourda, Melini Hadjitheori, Eleni Artymata, Melin Menelaou	45.40	GR, NR
2nd place, silver medalist(s)	Malta	Charlene Attard, Diane Borg, Therese Mallia, Lara Scerri	47.21	
3rd place, bronze medalist(s)	Luxembourg	Chantal Hayen, Kim Reuland, Laurence Kipgen, Sandra Frisch	47.48	
4	Iceland	Vilborg Jóhannsdóttir, Sigurbjörg Olafsdóttir, Kristín Birna Ólafsdóttir, Jóhanna Ingadóttir	48.63	
5	San Marino	Martina Pretelli, Eleonora Rossi, Barbara Rustignoli, Milen Tura	50.99	
6	Andorra	Lorena Álvarez, María Fernández, Roser Mazón, Montserrat Pujol	51.17	NR

=== 4 x 400 metres relay ===
June 4

Rank	Nation	Competitors	Time	Notes
1st place, gold medalist(s)	Cyprus	Anne Christofidou, Gavriela Sofokleous, Nikoletta Ignatiou, Alissa Kalinikou	3:49.15	
2nd place, silver medalist(s)	Malta	Charlene Attard, Diane Borg, Lara Scerri, Martina Xuereb	3:50.29	
3rd place, bronze medalist(s)	Luxembourg	Mandy Charlet, Carole Frisch, Katrijn Van Damme, Kim Reuland	3:55.86	
4	Iceland	Sigurbjörg Olafsdóttir, Kristín Birna Ólafsdóttir, Eygerður Hafþórsdóttir, Jóhanna Ingadóttir	4:02.04	

=== High jump ===
June 4

Rank	Name	Nationality	Result	Notes
1st place, gold medalist(s)	Ioulia Farmaka	Cyprus	1.75	
2nd place, silver medalist(s)	Tammy Kieffer	Luxembourg	1.65	
3rd place, bronze medalist(s)	Margarita Proestou	Cyprus	1.65	
4	Margarida Moreno	Andorra	1.65	
5	Dagrún Þorsteinsdóttir	Iceland	1.60	
6	Barbara Rustignoli	San Marino	1.60	
6	Milena Tura	San Marino	1.60	
8	Carole Kieffer	Luxembourg	1.55	
9	Lorena Álvarez	Andorra	1.55	

=== Pole vault ===
June 2

Rank	Name	Nationality	Result	Notes
1st place, gold medalist(s)	Þórey Edda Elísdóttir	Iceland	4.40	GR
2nd place, silver medalist(s)	Anna Fitidou	Cyprus	4.10	
3rd place, bronze medalist(s)	Stéphanie Vieillevoye	Luxembourg	3.20	
4	Eleonora Rossi	San Marino	3.00	
5	María Martínez	Andorra	2.60	
6	Sara Guerra	Andorra	2.40	

=== Long jump ===
June 2

Rank	Name	Nationality	Result	Notes
1st place, gold medalist(s)	Irene Charalambous	Cyprus	6.17	
2nd place, silver medalist(s)	Rebecca Camilleri	Malta	5.94	
3rd place, bronze medalist(s)	Montserrat Pujol	Andorra	5.75	NR
4	Jóhanna Ingadóttir	Iceland	5.69	
5	Laurence Kipgen	Luxembourg	5.68	
6	Georgia Papaconstantinou	Cyprus	5.46	
7	Laura Rossell	Andorra	4.90	

=== Long jump ===
May 31

Rank	Name	Nationality	Result	Notes
1st place, gold medalist(s)	Maria Diikiti	Cyprus	12.71	
2nd place, silver medalist(s)	Montserrat Pujol	Andorra	12.20	
3rd place, bronze medalist(s)	Jóhanna Ingadóttir	Iceland	11.61	
4	Lorena Álvarez	Andorra	11.22	

=== Shot put ===
May 31

Rank	Name	Nationality	Result	Notes
1st place, gold medalist(s)	Christina Strovolidou	Cyprus	14.07	
2nd place, silver medalist(s)	Kim Schartz	Luxembourg	13.69	
3rd place, bronze medalist(s)	Ásdís Hjálmsdóttir	Iceland	12.74	
4	Antonella Chouhal	Malta	10.38	

=== Discus throw ===
June 4

Rank	Name	Nationality	Result	Notes
1st place, gold medalist(s)	Ásdís Hjálmsdóttir	Iceland	46.07	
2nd place, silver medalist(s)	Alexandra Klatsia	Cyprus	44.41	
3rd place, bronze medalist(s)	Charikilia Odysseos	Cyprus	42.28	
4	Antonella Chouhal	Malta	34.50	

=== Hammer throw ===
June 2

Rank	Name	Nationality	Result	Notes
1st place, gold medalist(s)	Paraskevi Theodorou	Cyprus	53.09	GR
2nd place, silver medalist(s)	Vilborg Jóhannsdóttir	Iceland	37.10	
3rd place, bronze medalist(s)	Elena Villalón	Andorra	36.24	
4	Laura Rossell	Andorra	28.44	

=== Javelin throw ===
June 2

Rank	Name	Nationality	Result	Notes
1st place, gold medalist(s)	Ásdís Hjálmsdóttir	Iceland	57.05	
2nd place, silver medalist(s)	Vigdís Guðjónsdóttir	Iceland	52.68	
3rd place, bronze medalist(s)	Eleni Mavroudi	Cyprus	46.67	
4	Elena Villalón	Andorra	7.20	

== Medal table ==
Rank	Nation	Gold	Silver	Bronze	Total
1	Cyprus	19	12	10	41
2	Luxembourg	6	6	7	19
3	Iceland	6	4	9	19
4	Malta	2	9	6	17
5	Andorra	2	5	2	9
6	Monaco	2	2	1	5
7	San Marino	0	0	1	1
8	Liechtenstein	0	0	0	0
Totals (8 entries)		37	38	36	111

== Participating nations ==
- Andorra (24) (Host team)
- Cyprus (45)
- Iceland (21)
- Liechtenstein (3)
- Luxembourg (27)
- Malta (18)
- Monaco (15)
- San Marino (11)
