= Athletics at the 2009 Games of the Small States of Europe =

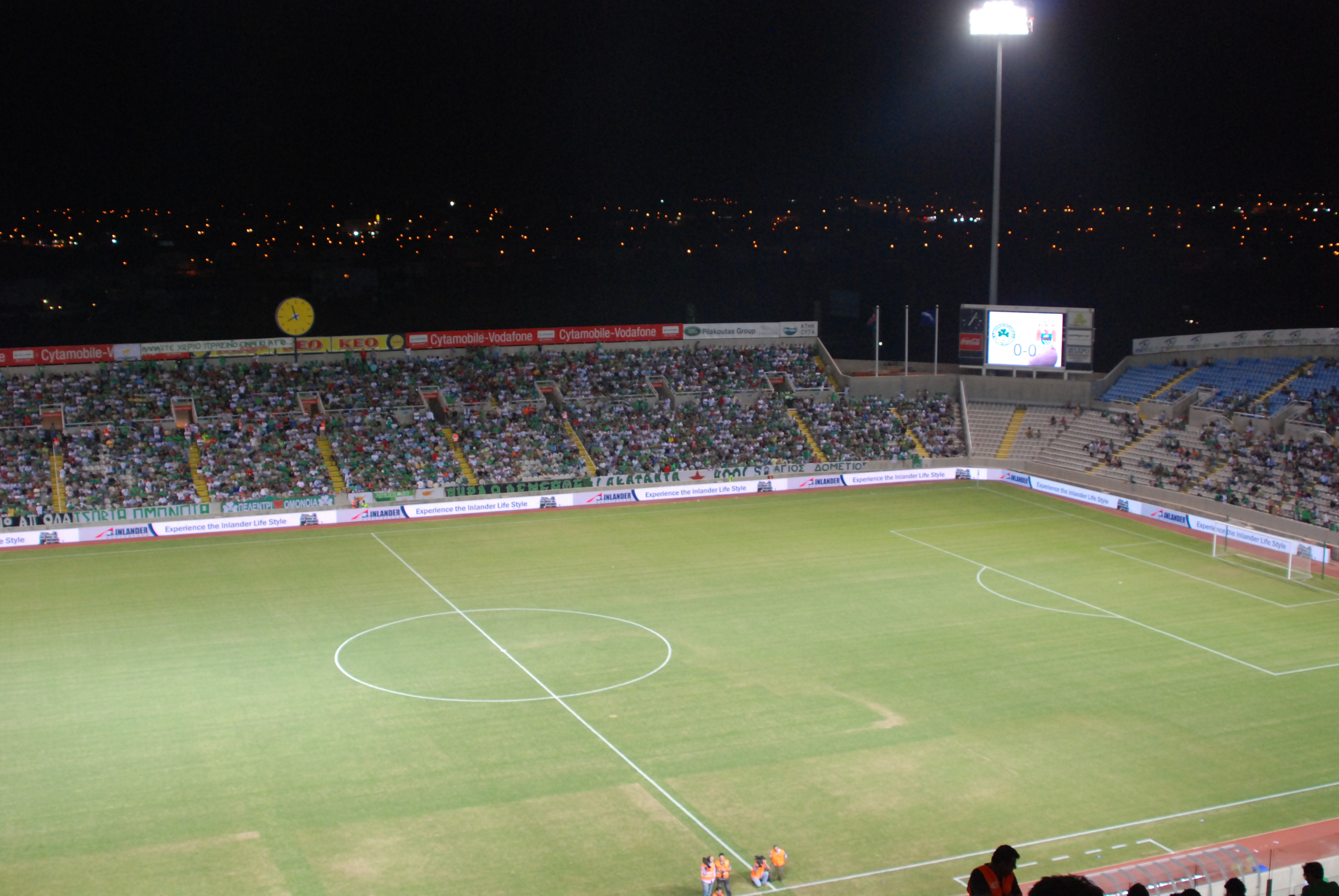
- Host stadium in Nicosia
- Dates: 2–6 June
- Host city: Nicosia, Cyprus
- Venue: GSP Stadium
- Events: 37
- Participation: 161 athletes from 8 nations

Athletics competition at the 2009 Games of the Small States of Europe was held from 2–6 June 2009 in Nicosia, Cyprus.

== Medal summary ==
=== Men ===
Event	Gold		Silver		Bronze	
100 metres	Panagiotis Ioannou (CYP)	10.38	Filipos Spastris (CYP)	10.61	Yoann Bebon (LUX)	10.74
200 metres	Stefanos Hadjinikolaou (CYP)	21.35	Nicolai Portelli (MLT)	21.63	Andreas Pafitis (CYP)	21.64
400 metres	Stefanos Hadjinikolaou (CYP)	48.46	James D'Alfonso (MLT)	49.07	Ivano Bucci (SMR)	49.29
800 metres	Mike Schumacher (LUX)	1:51.70	Demetris Filippou (CYP)	1:52.89	Christophe Bestgen (LUX)	1:53.64
1500 metres	Mike Schumacher (LUX)	3:52.24	Christian Thielen (LUX)	3:52.65	Alexandros Kalogerogiann (CYP)	3:59.83
5000 metres	Kári Steinn Karlsson (ISL)	14:45.71	Marcos Sanza (AND)	15:06.59	Jean-Marc Léandro (MON)	15:22.07
10,000 metres	Kári Steinn Karlsson (ISL)	31:13.29	Omar Bachir (MON)	31:30.19	Marcos Sanza (AND)	31:58.71
110 metres hurdles	Alexandros Stavridis (CYP)	13.88	Claude Godart (LUX)	14.22	Nourredine Metiri (MON)	16.22
400 metres hurdles	Minas Alozidis (CYP)	51.40	Jacques Frisch (LUX)	53.44	Bjorgvin Vikingsson (ISL)	53.79
3000 metres steeplechase	Panayiotis Kyprianou (CYP)	9:35.95	Jamal Baaziz (MON)	9:42.04	Kais Adli (MON)	10:14.35
4 × 100 metres relay	Cyprus; Andreas Pafitis; Filipos Spastris; Vasilis Polykarpou; Panagiotis Ioannou	41.55	Malta; Mario Bonello; Rachid Chouhal; Karl Farrugia; Nicolai Portelli	41.86	Luxembourg; Yoann Bebon; Marc Debanck; Claude Godart; Tom Hutmacher	42.25
4 × 400 metres relay	Cyprus; Riginos Menelaou; Stefanos Anastasiou; Antonis Aresti; Minas Alozidis	3:16.82	Luxembourg; Marc Debanck; Christian Thielen; Mike Schumacher; Jacques Frisch	3:16.90	Malta; Mario Bonello; Mario Debono; Nicolai Portelli; James Dalfonso	3:18.57
High jump	Kyriakos Ioannou (CYP)	2.25 (=GR)	Marios Nicolaou (CYP)	2.20	Einar Dadi Larusson (ISL)	1.95
Pole vault	Nikandros Stylianou (CYP)	4.80	Nourredine Metiri (MON)	4.60	Andreas Efstathiou (CYP)	4.50
Long jump	Kristinn Torfason (ISL)	7.60w	Mathaios Volou (CYP)	7.51	Zacharias Arnos (CYP)	7.32
Triple jump	Zacharias Arnos (CYP)	15.40	Panagiotis Volou (CYP)	15.21w	Kristinn Torfason (ISL)	14.79w
Shot put	Georgios Arestis (CYP)	18.14	Bjorn Thorsteinsson (ISL)	17.38	Jon Asgrimsson (ISL)	16.13
Discus throw	Apostolos Parellis (CYP)	60.55 (GR)	Savvas Aresti (CYP)	55.34	Bjorn Thorsteinsson (ISL)	54.11
Hammer throw	Bergur Ingi Petursson (ISL)	70.60 (GR)	Petros Sofianos (CYP)	64.38	Michael Kolokotronis (CYP)	56.76
Javelin throw	Jon Asgrimsson (ISL)	72.28	Ioannis Stylianou (CYP)	71.26	René Michlig (LIE)	69.56

=== Women ===
Event	Gold		Silver		Bronze	
100 metres	Eleni Artymata (CYP)	11.40 (GR)	Anna Ramona Papaioannou (CYP)	11.91	Chantal Hayen (LUX)	12.15
200 metres	Eleni Artymata (CYP)	23.34 (GR)	Anna Ramona Papaioannou (CYP)	24.65	Hrafnhild Eir Hermodsdot (ISL)	25.39
400 metres	Antroula Shialou (CYP)	56.38	Hafdis Sigurdardottir (ISL)	58.39	Julia Christodoulou (CYP)	59.09
800 metres	Stella Christoforou (CYP)	2:11.91	Martine Nobili (LUX)	2:13.25	Charline Mathias (LUX)	2:13.65
1500 metres	Stella Christoforou (CYP)	4:38.91	Martine Mellina (LUX)	4:43.76	Meropi Panayiotou (CYP)	4:44.88
5000 metres	Pascale Schmoetten (LUX)	17:36.77	Arndis Yr Hafthorsdottir (ISL)	17:51.37	Giselle Camilleri (MLT)	18:00.43
10,000 metres	Pascale Schmoetten (LUX)	37:09.65	Frida Run Thordardottir (ISL)	37:20.76	Carol Walsh (MLT)	37:39.13
100 metres hurdles	Evmorfia Baourda (CYP)	13.25 (GR, NR)	Polyxeni Irodotou (CYP)	13.92	Kim Reuland (LUX)	13.96
400 metres hurdles	Antroula Shialou (CYP)	59.99	Kim Reuland (LUX)	1:00.80	Panagiota Hadjigianni (CYP)	1:03.73
4 × 100 metres relay	Cyprus; Maria Savva; Anna Ramona Papaioannou; Evmorfia Baourda; Eleni Artymata	45.98	Luxembourg; Chantal Hayen; Laurence Thill; Kim Reuland; Laura Khol	47.29	Iceland; Linda Bjork Larusdottir; Helga Thorsteinsdottir; Hafdis Sigurdardottir; Hrafnhild Eir Hermodsdot	47.33
4 × 400 metres relay	Luxembourg; Chantal Hayen; Charline Mathias; Martine Nobili; Kim Reuland	3:49.07	Cyprus; Julia Christodoulou; Stella Christoforou; Panagiota Hadjigianni; Irene Tsiarta	3:53.96	Iceland; Hrafnhild Eir Hermodsdot; Hafdis Sigurdardottir; Helga Thorsteinsdottir; Agusta Tryggvadottir	4:00.10
High jump	Efrosyni Drosou (CYP)	1.78	Helga Thorsteinsdottir (ISL)	1.75	Liz Kuffer (LUX)	1.72
Pole vault	Marianna Zachariadi (CYP)	4.00	Stéphanie Vieillevoye (LUX)	3.60	Maria Aristotelous (CYP)	3.20
Long jump	Nektaria Panayi (CYP)	6.05	Johanna Ingadottir (ISL)	5.99	Irene Charalampous (CYP)	5.97
Triple jump	Johanna Ingadottir (ISL)	13.26	Thomaida Polydorou (CYP)	12.54	Eleftheria Christofi (CYP)	12.37
Shot put	Olympia Menelaou (CYP)	14.70	Florentia Kappa (CYP)	14.55	Helga Thorsteinsdottir (ISL)	13.60
Javelin throw	Ásdís Hjálmsdóttir (ISL)	58.93 (GR)	Eleni Mavroudi (CYP)	51.57	Helga Thorsteinsdottir (ISL)	48.56

== Men's results ==
=== 100 metres ===
June 2
Wind: +1.2 m/s

Rank	Name	Nationality	Time	Notes
1st place, gold medalist(s)	Panagiotis Ioannu	Cyprus	10.38	
2nd place, silver medalist(s)	Filipos Spastris	Cyprus	10.61	
3rd place, bronze medalist(s)	Yoann Bebon	Luxembourg	10.74	
4	Nicolai Portelli	Malta	10.79	
5	Michel Arlanda	Monaco	10.86	
6	Kristinn Torfason	Iceland	10.95	
7	Karl Farrugia	Malta	11.05	
8	Magnus Valgeir Gislason	Iceland	11.06	
9	Anas Adoui	Monaco	11.29	

=== 200 metres ===
June 6
Wind: +0.1 m/s

Rank	Name	Nationality	Time	Notes
1st place, gold medalist(s)	Stefanos Hadjinikolaou	Cyprus	21.35	PB
2nd place, silver medalist(s)	Nicolai Portelli	Malta	21.63	
3rd place, bronze medalist(s)	Andreas Pafitis	Cyprus	21.64	
4	Yoann Bebon	Luxembourg	21.65	
5	Mario Bonello	Malta	21.78	
6	Ivano Bucci	San Marino	22.00	
7	Trausti Stefansson	Iceland	22.19	
8	Tom Hutmacher	Luxembourg	22.37	

=== 400 metres ===
Heats – June 2

Rank	Heat	Name	Nationality	Time	Notes
1	2	Stefanos Hadjinikolaou	Cyprus	48.68	Q
2	2	James D'Alfonso	Malta	49.28	Q
3	2	Trausti Stefansson	Iceland	49.45	Q
4	2	Marc Debanck	Luxembourg	49.84	q
5	1	Kyriakos Antoniou	Cyprus	50.53	Q
6	1	Ivano Bucci	San Marino	50.68	Q
7	1	Hugo Ribas	Monaco	51.16	Q
8	1	Florent Battistel	Monaco	52.49	q
	1	Mario Debono	Malta	DNS	

Final – June 4

Rank	Name	Nationality	Time	Notes
1st place, gold medalist(s)	Stefanos Hadjinikolaou	Cyprus	48.46	
2nd place, silver medalist(s)	James D'Alfonso	Malta	49.07	
3rd place, bronze medalist(s)	Ivano Bucci	San Marino	49.29	
4	Trausti Stefansson	Iceland	49.36	PB
5	Kyriakos Antoniou	Cyprus	49.84	
6	Marc Debanck	Luxembourg	50.04	
7	Hugo Ribas	Monaco	51.01	PB
8	Florent Battistel	Monaco	52.30	

=== 800 metres ===
June 2

Rank	Name	Nationality	Time	Notes
1st place, gold medalist(s)	Mike Schumacher	Luxembourg	1:51.70	
2nd place, silver medalist(s)	Demetris Filippou	Cyprus	1:52.89	PB
3rd place, bronze medalist(s)	Christophe Bestgen	Luxembourg	1:53.64	
4	Brice Etes	Monaco	1:53.93	PB
5	Rémy Charpentier	Monaco	1:54.22	
6	Marios Markides	Cyprus	1:56.38	
7	Mark Herrera	Malta	1:56.55	
8	Thorbergur Ingi Jonsson	Iceland	1:58.15	
9	Mario Debono	Malta	1:59.22	

=== 1500 metres ===
June 6

Rank	Name	Nationality	Time	Notes
1st place, gold medalist(s)	Mike Schumacher	Luxembourg	3:52.24	PB
2nd place, silver medalist(s)	Christian Thielen	Luxembourg	3:52.65	
3rd place, bronze medalist(s)	Alexandros Kalogerogiann	Cyprus	3:59.83	
4	Thorbergur Ingi Jonsson	Iceland	4:00.09	
5	Kais Adli	Monaco	4:05.30	
6	Stefan Gudmundsson	Iceland	4:05.53	
7	Orestis Sofokleous	Cyprus	4:11.20	
8	Mark Herrera	Malta	4:16.31	
9	Samuel Malik Diaz	Monaco	4:18.66	

=== 5000 metres ===
June 2

Rank	Name	Nationality	Time	Notes
1st place, gold medalist(s)	Kári Steinn Karlsson	Iceland	14:45.71	
2nd place, silver medalist(s)	Marcos Sanza	Andorra	15:06.59	
3rd place, bronze medalist(s)	Jean-Marc Léandro	Monaco	15:22.07	
4	Antoine Berlin	Monaco	15:54.22	
5	Pol Mellina	Luxembourg	16:04.02	
	Christofer Boast	Cyprus	DNF	
	Chrysanthos Chrysanthou	Cyprus	DNF	
	Stefan Gudmundsson	Iceland	DNS	

=== 10,000 metres ===
June 6

Rank	Name	Nationality	Time	Notes
1st place, gold medalist(s)	Kári Steinn Karlsson	Iceland	31:13.29	
2nd place, silver medalist(s)	Omar Bachir	Monaco	31:30.19	PB
3rd place, bronze medalist(s)	Marcos Sanza	Andorra	31:58.71	
4	Vincent Nothum	Luxembourg	32:22.73	
5	Christoforos Protopapas	Cyprus	34:48.41	
	Christofer Boast	Cyprus	DNF	
	Jean-Marc Léandro	Monaco	DNS	

=== 110 metres hurdles ===
June 4
Wind: +0.8 m/s

Rank	Name	Nationality	Time	Notes
1st place, gold medalist(s)	Alexandros Stavridis	Cyprus	13.88	GR
2nd place, silver medalist(s)	Claude Godart	Luxembourg	14.22	
3rd place, bronze medalist(s)	Nourredine Metiri	Monaco	16.22	
4	Neofytos Georgiou	Cyprus	16.39	
5	Einar Dadi Larusson	Iceland	17.95	
	Moïse Louisy-Louis	Monaco	DNF	
	Bjorgvin Vikingsson	Iceland	DNF	

=== 400 metres hurdles ===
June 4

Rank	Name	Nationality	Time	Notes
1st place, gold medalist(s)	Minas Alozidis	Cyprus	51.40	
2nd place, silver medalist(s)	Jacques Frisch	Luxembourg	53.44	
3rd place, bronze medalist(s)	Bjorgvin Vikingsson	Iceland	53.79	
4	Aris Xoufaridis	Cyprus	54.07	

=== 3000 metres steeplechase ===
June 4

Rank	Name	Nationality	Time	Notes
1st place, gold medalist(s)	Panayiotis Kyprianou	Cyprus	9:35.95	
2nd place, silver medalist(s)	Jamal Baaziz	Monaco	9:42.04	
3rd place, bronze medalist(s)	Kais Adli	Monaco	10:14.35	
4	Kyriacos Aristotelous	Cyprus	10:26.32	
	Stefan Gudmundsson	Iceland	DNF	

=== 4 × 100 meters relay ===
June 6

Rank	Nation	Competitors	Time	Notes
1st place, gold medalist(s)	Cyprus	Andreas Pafitis, Filipos Spastris, Vasilis Polykarpou, Panagiotis Ioannou	41.55	
2nd place, silver medalist(s)	Malta	Mario Bonello, Rachid Chouhal, Karl Farrugia, Nicolai Portelli	41.86	
3rd place, bronze medalist(s)	Luxembourg	Yoann Bebon, Marc Debanck, Claude Godart, Tom Hutmacher	42.25	
4	Iceland	Magnus Valgeir Gislason, Einar Dadi Larusson, Trausti Stefansson, Kristinn Torfason	42.87	
5	Monaco	Florent Battistel, Hugo Ribas, Rémy Charpentier, Brice Etes	44.00	

=== 4 × 400 meters relay ===
June 6

Rank	Nation	Competitors	Time	Notes
1st place, gold medalist(s)	Cyprus	Riginos Menelaou, Stefanos Anastasiou, Antonis Aresti, Minas Alozidis	3:16.82	
2nd place, silver medalist(s)	Luxembourg	Marc Debanck, Christian Thielen, Mike Schumacher, Jacques Frisch	3:16.90	
3rd place, bronze medalist(s)	Malta	Mario Bonello, Mario Debono, Nicolai Portelli, James D'Alfonso	3:18.57	
4	Monaco	Hugo Ribas, Florent Battistel, Rémy Charpentier, Brice Etes	3:18.82	
5	Iceland	Einar Dadi Larusson, Thorbergur Ingi Jonsson, Kristinn Torfason, Bjorgvin Vikingsson	3:23.37	

=== High jump ===
June 2

Rank	Athlete	Nationality	1.70	1.80	1.90	1.95	2.00	2.05	2.15	2.25	2.30	Result	Notes
1st place, gold medalist(s)	Kyriakos Ioannou	Cyprus	–	–	o	–	–	o	o	xo	xxx	2.25	=GR
2nd place, silver medalist(s)	Marios Nicolaou	Cyprus	–	–	xo	o	xo	xxx				2.00	
3rd place, bronze medalist(s)	Einar Dadi Larusson	Iceland	–	o	o	o	xxx					1.95	
4	Sergi Raya	Andorra	xo	xxx								1.70	

=== Pole vault ===
June 2

Rank	Athlete	Nationality	3.80	4.00	4.20	4.30	4.50	4.60	4.70	4.80	Result	Notes
1st place, gold medalist(s)	Nikandros Stylianou	Cyprus	o	x–	o	o	o	xo	o	o	4.80	
2nd place, silver medalist(s)	Nourredine Metiri	Monaco	–	o	xo	xxo	xo	xo	xx–	x	4.60	
3rd place, bronze medalist(s)	Andreas Efstathiou	Cyprus	o	o	o	o	xxo	xxx			4.50	
4	Einar Dadi Larusson	Iceland	o	o	xxo	xxx					4.20	
	Moïse Louisy-Louis	Monaco	xxx								NM	

=== Long jump ===
June 4

Rank	Athlete	Nationality	#1	#2	#3	#4	#5	#6	Result	Notes
1st place, gold medalist(s)	Kristinn Torfason	Iceland	7.06	7.11	7.31	x	7.60w	7.46w	7.60w	
2nd place, silver medalist(s)	Mathaios Volou	Cyprus	7.31w	7.43	7.51	7.45	x	x	7.51	PB
3rd place, bronze medalist(s)	Zacharias Arnos	Cyprus	7.10	7.32w	7.31w	x	x	7.06	7.32w	
4	Luca Maccapani	San Marino	7.07w	7.25	x	7.24w	5.36w	6.61w	7.25	NR
5	Andy Grech	Malta	6.92w	6.84	x	6.83	6.77	6.78	6.92w	
	Rachid Chouhal	Malta							DNS	
	Moïse Louisy-Louis	Monaco							DNS	

=== Triple jump ===
June 6

Rank	Athlete	Nationality	#1	#2	#3	#4	#5	#6	Result	Notes
1st place, gold medalist(s)	Zacharias Arnos	Cyprus	14.76w	–	–	15.08	x	15.40	15.40	
2nd place, silver medalist(s)	Panagiotis Volou	Cyprus	14.92w	x	15.21	15.21w	x	15.13	15.21	
3rd place, bronze medalist(s)	Kristinn Torfason	Iceland	x	14.24	–	13.86	–	14.79w	14.79w	
4	Federico Gorrieri	San Marino	14.08w	14.00	13.97	x	14.13	x	14.13	

=== Shot put ===
June 6

Rank	Athlete	Nationality	#1	#2	#3	#4	#5	#6	Result	Notes
1st place, gold medalist(s)	Georgios Arestis	Cyprus	x	x	x	16.84	18.14	x	18.14	
2nd place, silver medalist(s)	Bjorn Thorsteinsson	Iceland	17.00	16.86	17.37	17.38	x	x	17.38	
3rd place, bronze medalist(s)	Jon Asgrimsson	Iceland	15.42	15.92	16.13	15.92	x	x	16.13	
4	Petros Mitsides	Cyprus	14.90	15.96	x	15.39	15.56	15.19	15.96	
5	Carlos Jorge Queiros	Andorra	14.54	x	x	14.83	x	14.64	14.83	
	René Michlig	Liechtenstein							DNS	

=== Discus throw ===
June 4

Rank	Athlete	Nationality	#1	#2	#3	#4	#5	#6	Result	Notes
1st place, gold medalist(s)	Apostolos Parellis	Cyprus	60.55	x	58.56	59.00	59.23	57.84	60.55	GR
2nd place, silver medalist(s)	Savvas Aresti	Cyprus	54.97	55.34	x	x	53.76	54.10	55.34	PB
3rd place, bronze medalist(s)	Bjorn Thorsteinsson	Iceland	52.48	52.38	50.23	50.72	54.11	50.89	54.11	
4	Bergur Ingi Petursson	Iceland	40.84	40.34	x	45.74	45.74	46.21	46.21	

=== Hammer throw ===
June 2

Rank	Athlete	Nationality	#1	#2	#3	#4	#5	#6	Result	Notes
1st place, gold medalist(s)	Bergur Ingi Petursson	Iceland	70.60	x	69.47	x	x	65.51	70.60	GR
2nd place, silver medalist(s)	Petros Sofianos	Cyprus	61.10	64.38	x	x	62.13	x	64.38	
3rd place, bronze medalist(s)	Michael Kolokotronis	Cyprus	55.90	56.76	56.40	55.97	x	x	56.76	

=== Javelin throw ===
June 2

Rank	Athlete	Nationality	#1	#2	#3	#4	#5	#6	Result	Notes
1st place, gold medalist(s)	Jon Asgrimsson	Iceland	70.03	71.41	72.28	72.00	71.50	68.26	72.28	
2nd place, silver medalist(s)	Ioannis Stylianou	Cyprus	64.15	71.26	68.24	64.87	x	x	71.26	
3rd place, bronze medalist(s)	René Michlig	Liechtenstein	63.95	66.97	66.40	x	66.54	69.56	69.56	
4	Antoine Wagner	Luxembourg	61.79	60.78	64.56	66.62	62.62	61.33	66.62	PB
5	Panagiotis Kalogirou	Cyprus	62.72	65.19	x	63.41	65.29	61.85	65.29	
6	Moïse Louisy-Louis	Monaco	x	55.17	–	–	–	–	55.17	

== Women's results ==
=== 100 metres ===
Heats – June 2
Wind:
Heat 1: -1.0 m/s, Heat 2: +3.6 m/s

Rank	Heat	Name	Nationality	Time	Notes
1	1	Eleni Artymata	Cyprus	11.55	Q
2	2	Anna Ramona Papaioannou	Cyprus	12.00	Q
3	1	Chantal Hayen	Luxembourg	12.17	Q
4	1	Lara Scerri	Malta	12.33	Q
5	2	Hrafnhild Eir Hermodsdottir	Iceland	12.45	Q
6	2	Diane Borg	Malta	12.50	Q
7	1	Sara Maroncelli	San Marino	12.57	q
7	2	Martina Pretelli	San Marino	12.57	q
9	1	Linda Bjork Larusdottir	Iceland	12.67	
9	2	Laurence Thill	Luxembourg	12.67	
11	2	Marie Juanita Paulen	Monaco	13.22	
	1	Montserrat Pujol	Andorra	DNS	

Final – June 2
Wind:
-0.7 m/s

Rank	Name	Nationality	Time	Notes
1st place, gold medalist(s)	Eleni Artymata	Cyprus	11.40	GR
2nd place, silver medalist(s)	Anna Ramona Papaioannou	Cyprus	11.91	PB
3rd place, bronze medalist(s)	Chantal Hayen	Luxembourg	12.15	PB
4	Hrafnhild Eir Hermodsdottir	Iceland	12.39	
5	Diane Borg	Malta	12.41	
6	Martina Pretelli	San Marino	12.49	NR
7	Lara Scerri	Malta	12.51	
8	Sara Maroncelli	San Marino	12.63	PB

=== 200 metres ===
June 6
Wind: -0.3 m/s

Rank	Name	Nationality	Time	Notes
1st place, gold medalist(s)	Eleni Artymata	Cyprus	23.34	GR
2nd place, silver medalist(s)	Anna Ramona Papaioannou	Cyprus	24.65	
3rd place, bronze medalist(s)	Hrafnhild Eir Hermodsdottir	Iceland	25.39	
4	Martina Pretelli	San Marino	25.48	NR
5	Hafdis Sigurdardottir	Iceland	25.60	
6	Lara Scerri	Malta	25.73	
7	Dorianne Micallef	Malta	26.93	
	Montserrat Pujol	Andorra	DNS	

=== 400 metres ===
June 4

Rank	Name	Nationality	Time	Notes
1st place, gold medalist(s)	Antroula Shialou	Cyprus	56.38	
2nd place, silver medalist(s)	Hafdis Sigurdardottir	Iceland	58.39	
3rd place, bronze medalist(s)	Julia Christodoulo	Cyprus	59.09	
4	Francesca Xuereb	Malta	1:01.93	
	Céline Pace	Malta	DNS	

=== 800 metres ===
June 2

Rank	Name	Nationality	Time	Notes
1st place, gold medalist(s)	Stella Christoforou	Cyprus	2:11.91	
2nd place, silver medalist(s)	Martine Nobili	Luxembourg	2:13.25	
3rd place, bronze medalist(s)	Charline Mathias	Luxembourg	2:13.65	
4	Aurélie Glowacz	Monaco	2:18.29	PB
5	Gavriella Sophocleous	Cyprus	2:19.04	
6	Arndis Yr Hafthorsdottir	Iceland	2:21.76	
7	Caroline Mangion	Monaco	2:25.12	
	Céline Pace	Malta	DNS	

=== 1500 metres ===
June 4

Rank	Name	Nationality	Time	Notes
1st place, gold medalist(s)	Stella Christoforou	Cyprus	4:38.91	
2nd place, silver medalist(s)	Martine Mellina	Luxembourg	4:43.76	
3rd place, bronze medalist(s)	Meropi Panayiotou	Cyprus	4:44.88	PB
4	Arndis Yr Hafthorsdottir	Iceland	4:44.93	
5	Aurélie Glowacz	Monaco	4:47.51	
6	Jil Gloesener	Luxembourg	4:56.67	
	Caroline Mangion	Monaco	DNF	

=== 5000 metres ===
June 6

Rank	Name	Nationality	Time	Notes
1st place, gold medalist(s)	Pascale Schmoetten	Luxembourg	17:36.77	PB
2nd place, silver medalist(s)	Arndis Yr Hafthorsdottir	Iceland	17:51.37	
3rd place, bronze medalist(s)	Giselle Camilleri	Malta	18:00.43	
4	Frida Run Thordardottir	Iceland	18:35.00	
5	Silvia Felipo	Andorra	19:06.95	
6	Eleni Ioannou	Cyprus	19:49.31	
	Evgenia Korkokiou	Cyprus	DNF	
	Carol Walsh	Malta	DNF	

=== 10,000 metres ===
June 2

Rank	Name	Nationality	Time	Notes
1st place, gold medalist(s)	Pascale Schmoetten	Luxembourg	37:09.65	
2nd place, silver medalist(s)	Frida Run Thordardottir	Iceland	37:20.76	
3rd place, bronze medalist(s)	Carol Walsh	Malta	37:39.13	
4	Giselle Camilleri	Malta	38:08.47	
5	Marilena Shophokleous	Cyprus	40:13.58	
6	Ioulia Kannava	Cyprus	44:49.85	
	Silvia Felipo	Andorra	DNF	

=== 100 metres hurdles ===
June 6
Wind: -0.9 m/s

Rank	Name	Nationality	Time	Notes
1st place, gold medalist(s)	Evmorfia Baourda	Cyprus	13.25	GR, NR
2nd place, silver medalist(s)	Polyxeni Irodotou	Cyprus	13.92	
3rd place, bronze medalist(s)	Kim Reuland	Luxembourg	13.96	
4	Helga Thorsteinsdottir	Iceland	14.39	
5	Barbara Rustignoli	San Marino	14.77	NR
6	Linda Bjork Larusdottir	Iceland	14.82	
7	Martine Bomb	Luxembourg	15.11	
8	Marija Sciberras	Malta	15.78	

=== 400 metres hurdles ===
June 4

Rank	Name	Nationality	Time	Notes
1st place, gold medalist(s)	Antroula Shialou	Cyprus	59.99	
2nd place, silver medalist(s)	Kim Reuland	Luxembourg	1:00.80	
3rd place, bronze medalist(s)	Panagiota Hadjigianni	Cyprus	1:03.73	
4	Martine Bomb	Luxembourg	1:04.67	

=== 4 × 100 meters relay ===
June 6

Rank	Nation	Competitors	Time	Notes
1st place, gold medalist(s)	Cyprus	Maria Savva, Anna Ramona Papaioannou, Evmorfia Baourda, Eleni Artymata	45.98	
2nd place, silver medalist(s)	Luxembourg	Chantal Hayen, Laurence Thill, Kim Reuland, Laura Khol	47.29	
3rd place, bronze medalist(s)	Iceland	Linda Bjork Larusdottir, Helga Thorsteinsdottir, Hafdis Sigurdardottir, Hrafnhild Eir Hermodsdottir	47.33	
4	Malta	Charlene Attard, Diane Borg, Lara Scerri, Angie Mangion	48.30	
5	San Marino	Eleonora Rossi, Martina Pretelli, Sara Maroncelli, Barbara Rustignoli	50.53	

=== 4 × 400 meters relay ===
June 6

Rank	Nation	Competitors	Time	Notes
1st place, gold medalist(s)	Luxembourg	Chantal Hayen, Charline Mathias, Martine Nobili, Kim Reuland	3:49.07	
2nd place, silver medalist(s)	Cyprus	Julia Christodoulou, Stella Christoforou, Panagiota Hadjigianni, Irene Tsiarta	3:53.96	
3rd place, bronze medalist(s)	Iceland	Hrafnhild Eir Hermodsdottir, Hafdis Sigurdardottir, Helga Thorsteinsdottir, Agusta Tryggvadottir	4:00.10	
4	Malta	Diane Borg, Céline Pace, Lara Scerri, Francesca Xuereb	4:01.64	
5	Monaco	Rachel Rominger, Sonia Del Prete, Caroline Mangion, Aurélie Glowacz	4:02.21	
6	San Marino	Sara Maroncelli, Barbara Rustignoli, Martina Pretelli, Eleonora Rossi	4:07.75	NR

=== High jump ===
June 6

Rank	Athlete	Nationality	1.50	1.55	1.60	1.64	1.68	1.72	1.75	1.78	1.82	Result	Notes
1st place, gold medalist(s)	Efrosyni Drosou	Cyprus	–	–	o	o	o	xo	o	xo	xxx	1.78	
2nd place, silver medalist(s)	Helga Thorsteinsdottir	Iceland	–	–	o	o	o	xo	o	xxx		1.75	
3rd place, bronze medalist(s)	Liz Kuffer	Luxembourg	–	–	o	o	xo	o	xxx			1.72	PB
4	Agusta Tryggvadottir	Iceland	–	o	o	o	o	xo	xxx			1.72	PB
5	Stefani Razi	Cyprus	–	–	o	o	o	xxo	xxx			1.72	
6	Sonia Del Prete	Monaco	o	o	o	xxx						1.60	

=== Pole vault ===
June 4

Rank	Athlete	Nationality	2.80	3.00	3.20	3.30	3.50	3.60	3.70	4.00	4.20	Result	Notes
1st place, gold medalist(s)	Marianna Zachariadi	Cyprus	–	–	–	–	–	–	–	o	xxx	4.00	
2nd place, silver medalist(s)	Stéphanie Vieillevoye	Luxembourg	–	–	–	xo	xo	xxo	xxx			3.60	
3rd place, bronze medalist(s)	Maria Aristotelous	Cyprus	o	o	xxo	xxx						3.20	
	Eleonora Rossi	San Marino	xxx									NM	

=== Long jump ===
June 4

Rank	Athlete	Nationality	#1	#2	#3	#4	#5	#6	Result	Notes
1st place, gold medalist(s)	Nektaria Panayi	Cyprus	5.80w	5.62w	5.96	5.87	6.05	5.86w	6.05	
2nd place, silver medalist(s)	Johanna Ingadottir	Iceland	x	5.97w	5.98	5.85w	5.99	5.72	5.99	
3rd place, bronze medalist(s)	Irene Charalampous	Cyprus	x	5.81	x	x	5.97	5.87	5.97	
4	Sonia Del Prete	Monaco	5.42w	5.80	x	5.58w	x	5.63	5.80	PB
5	Alessandra Pace	Malta	5.68w	5.61w	5.54w	5.66w	5.58w	5.72	5.72	
6	Barbara Rustignoli	San Marino	5.47	5.55w	5.39	5.51	5.52	5.69	5.69	NR
7	Hafdis Sigurdardottir	Iceland	5.20w	5.48	x	x	x	x	5.48	
8	Montserrat Pujol	Andorra	5.29w	x	x	5.40	5.25w	5.26	5.40	
9	Angie Mangion	Malta	5.16	4.76w	5.22w	–	–	–	5.22w	

=== Triple jump ===
June 2

Rank	Athlete	Nationality	#1	#2	#3	#4	#5	#6	Result	Notes
1st place, gold medalist(s)	Johanna Ingadottir	Iceland	12.66	13.26w	x	12.61	12.75	12.69	13.26w	PB
2nd place, silver medalist(s)	Thomaida Polydorou	Cyprus	x	12.54	12.37	12.08	12.29	12.32	12.54	
3rd place, bronze medalist(s)	Eleftheria Christofi	Cyprus	12.37	12.09	12.02	–	–	–	12.37	
4	Sonia Del Prete	Monaco	11.84	x	11.72	12.08	x	x	12.08	
5	Agusta Tryggvadottir	Iceland	11.74w	x	11.75	11.81	x	11.99	11.99	PB
6	Montserrat Pujol	Andorra	x	11.58	x	11.66	11.82	11.89	11.89	

=== Shot put ===
June 6

Rank	Athlete	Nationality	#1	#2	#3	#4	#5	#6	Result	Notes
1st place, gold medalist(s)	Olympia Menelaou	Cyprus	14.32	14.70	x	x	14.25	x	14.70	
2nd place, silver medalist(s)	Florentia Kappa	Cyprus	13.46	14.55	13.93	14.02	14.28	14.55	14.55	
3rd place, bronze medalist(s)	Helga Thorsteinsdottir	Iceland	13.21	13.25	x	x	x	13.60	13.60	
4	Agusta Tryggvadottir	Iceland	12.10	11.95	12.12	12.46	x	x	12.46	

=== Javelin throw ===
June 2

Rank	Athlete	Nationality	#1	#2	#3	#4	#5	#6	Result	Notes
1st place, gold medalist(s)	Ásdís Hjálmsdóttir	Iceland	54.04	54.59	58.93	57.30	54.64	53.70	58.93	GR
2nd place, silver medalist(s)	Eleni Mavroudi	Cyprus	48.72	51.57	x	x	49.13	49.48	51.57	PB
3rd place, bronze medalist(s)	Helga Thorsteinsdottir	Iceland	39.76	39.53	40.55	48.56	x	39.28	48.56	
4	Noémie Pleimling	Luxembourg	41.83	44.36	42.90	x	42.28	43.48	44.36	NR
5	Anastasia Mouratidou	Cyprus	x	37.18	43.22	43.04	x	x	43.22	

== Medal table ==
Rank	Nation	Gold	Silver	Bronze	Total
1	Cyprus	25	15	11	51
2	Iceland	7	6	10	23
3	Luxembourg	5	9	7	21
4	Malta	0	3	3	6
4	Monaco	0	3	3	6
6	Andorra	0	1	1	2
7	Liechtenstein	0	0	1	1
7	San Marino	0	0	1	1
Totals (8 entries)		37	37	37	111

== Participating nations ==
- Andorra (5)
- Cyprus (65) (Host team)
- Iceland (21)
- Liechtenstein (1)
- Luxembourg (24)
- Malta (19)
- Monaco (19)
- San Marino (7)
