= 2006 European Athletics Championships – Men's 100 metres =

Men's 100 metres at the 2006 European Athletics Championships
- Venue: Ullevi
- Location: Gothenburg
- Dates: 7 August (heats & quarterfinals); 8 August (semifinals & final)
- Competitors: 44 from 23 nations
- Winning time: 9.99

Medalists
| gold medal | Francis Obikwelu | Portugal |
| silver medal | Andrey Yepishin | Russia |
| bronze medal | Matic Osovnikar | Slovenia |

The men's 100 metres at the 2006 European Athletics Championships were held at the Ullevi on August 7 and August 8. Portugal's Francis Obikwelu added the European title to his Olympic Games silver medal in Athens. The 27-year-old was all but last out of the blocks but showed his class with a brilliant surge of pace to finish in 9.99 seconds - the first time the European title has been won with a sub-10 second time. Poland's Dariusz Kuć delayed the drama with a nervy false start.

== Schedule ==
| Date | Time | Round |
|---|---|---|
| August 7, 2006 | 10:40 | Round 1 |
| August 7, 2006 | 18:35 | Round 2 |
| August 8, 2006 | 18:10 | Semifinals |
| August 8, 2006 | 19:40 | Final |

== Results ==
| KEY: | Q | Automatic qualifiers | q | Non-automatic qualifiers | NR | National record | PB | Personal best | SB | Seasonal best |

=== Round 1 ===
Qualification: First 4 in each heat (Q) and the next 8 fastest (q) advance to the Round 2.

| Rank | Heat | Name | Nationality | Time | Notes |
|---|---|---|---|---|---|
| 1 | 4 | Dwain Chambers | United Kingdom | 10.24 | Q |
| 2 | 6 | Francis Obikwelu | Portugal | 10.25 | Q |
| 3 | 2 | Ronald Pognon | France | 10.26 | Q |
| 4 | 4 | Matic Osovnikar | Slovenia | 10.29 | Q |
| 5 | 1 | Tyrone Edgar | United Kingdom | 10.32 | Q |
| 6 | 2 | Anatoliy Dovhal | Ukraine | 10.33 | Q |
| 7 | 5 | Andrey Yepishin | Russia | 10.36 | Q |
| 8 | 3 | Mark Lewis-Francis | United Kingdom | 10.37 | Q |
| 8 | 5 | Dariusz Kuć | Poland | 10.37 | Q |
| 10 | 6 | Roland Németh | Hungary | 10.39 | Q |
| 11 | 6 | Oudéré Kankarafou | France | 10.40 | Q |
| 12 | 1 | Łukasz Chyła | Poland | 10.42 | Q |
| 13 | 1 | Ronny Ostwald | Germany | 10.42 | Q |
| 14 | 4 | Orkatz Beitia | Spain | 10.43 | Q |
| 15 | 3 | Marcin Jędrusiński | Poland | 10.45 | Q |
| 16 | 3 | Jarkko Ruostekivi | Finland | 10.47 | Q |
| 16 | 6 | Mikhail Yegorychev | Russia | 10.47 | Q |
| 18 | 2 | Nghi Tran | Finland | 10.50 | Q |
| 18 | 3 | Jan Žumer | Slovenia | 10.50 | Q |
| 18 | 4 | Daniel Abenzoar-Foulé | Luxembourg | 10.50 | Q |
| 18 | 5 | Simo Sipilä | Finland | 10.50 | Q, PB |
| 22 | 1 | Aleksandr Smirnov | Russia | 10.51 | Q |
| 22 | 4 | Markus Lüthi | Switzerland | 10.51 | q, SB |
| 22 | 4 | Dimitri Demonière | France | 10.51 | q |
| 25 | 1 | Gergely Németh | Hungary | 10.52 | q |
| 25 | 3 | Martin Rypdal | Norway | 10.52 | q |
| 27 | 6 | Iván Mocholí | Spain | 10.53 | q |
| 28 | 2 | Erik Wijmeersch | Belgium | 10.55 | Q |
| 28 | 3 | Massimiliano Donati | Italy | 10.55 | q |
| 30 | 5 | Ángel David Rodríguez | Spain | 10.57 | Q |
| 30 | 2 | Luca Verdecchia | Italy | 10.57 | q |
| 32 | 1 | Andreas Baumann | Switzerland | 10.58 | q |
| 33 | 5 | Neophytos Michael | Cyprus | 10.60 | |
| 34 | 5 | John Ertzgaard | Norway | 10.62 | |
| 34 | 5 | Maurizio Checcucci | Italy | 10.62 | |
| 36 | 6 | Daniel Persson | Sweden | 10.66 | |
| 37 | 6 | Vojtěch Šulc | Czech Republic | 10.67 | |
| 38 | 3 | İsmail Aslan | Turkey | 10.71 | |
| 39 | 3 | Darren Gilford | Malta | 10.73 | |
| 40 | 2 | Matjaž Borovina | Slovenia | 10.74 | |
| 41 | 2 | Tal Mor | Israel | 10.78 | |
| 42 | 1 | Naum Mitreski | Macedonia | 11.12 | |
| 43 | 4 | Valentinos Athanasiou | Cyprus | 11.25 | |
| | 1 | Kostyantyn Vasyukov | Ukraine | DQ | |

=== Round 2 ===
Qualification: First 4 in each heat (Q) advance to the semifinals.

| Rank | Heat | Name | Nationality | Time | Notes |
|---|---|---|---|---|---|
| 1 | 2 | Ronald Pognon | France | 10.19 | Q |
| 2 | 3 | Francis Obikwelu | Portugal | 10.28 | Q |
| 3 | 1 | Dariusz Kuć | Poland | 10.32 | Q |
| 4 | 1 | Ángel David Rodríguez | Spain | 10.32 | Q |
| 5 | 2 | Mark Lewis-Francis | United Kingdom | 10.33 | Q |
| 6 | 1 | Anatoliy Dovhal | Ukraine | 10.37 | Q |
| 6 | 3 | Matic Osovnikar | Slovenia | 10.37 | Q |
| 8 | 1 | Dwain Chambers | United Kingdom | 10.39 | Q |
| 9 | 4 | Andrey Yepishin | Russia | 10.40 | Q |
| 10 | 2 | Łukasz Chyła | Poland | 10.42 | Q |
| 11 | 4 | Oudéré Kankarafou | France | 10.45 | Q |
| 12 | 4 | Marcin Jędrusiński | Poland | 10.47 | Q |
| 12 | 1 | Markus Lüthi | Switzerland | 10.47 | SB |
| 14 | 2 | Ronny Ostwald | Germany | 10.48 | Q |
| 14 | 4 | Jan Žumer | Slovenia | 10.48 | Q |
| 14 | 1 | Jarkko Ruostekivi | Finland | 10.48 | |
| 17 | 3 | Erik Wijmeersch | Belgium | 10.49 | Q |
| 18 | 4 | Tyrone Edgar | United Kingdom | 10.51 | |
| 19 | 2 | Massimiliano Donati | Italy | 10.52 | |
| 20 | 3 | Orkatz Beitia | Spain | 10.53 | Q |
| 21 | 3 | Roland Németh | Hungary | 10.55 | |
| 22 | 3 | Luca Verdecchia | Italy | 10.58 | |
| 23 | 3 | Dimitri Demonière | France | 10.59 | |
| 23 | 4 | Daniel Abenzoar-Foulé | Luxembourg | 10.59 | |
| 25 | 1 | Mikhail Yegorychev | Russia | 10.62 | |
| 26 | 2 | Gergely Németh | Hungary | 10.63 | |
| 27 | 2 | Aleksandr Smirnov | Russia | 10.65 | |
| 27 | 4 | Andreas Baumann | Switzerland | 10.65 | |
| 29 | 1 | Martin Rypdal | Norway | 10.66 | |
| 30 | 2 | Nghi Tran | Finland | 10.67 | |
| 30 | 4 | Iván Mocholí | Spain | 10.67 | |
| 32 | 3 | Simo Sipilä | Finland | 10.73 | |

=== Semifinals ===
First 4 of each Semifinal will be directly qualified (Q) for the Final.

==== Semifinal 1 ====
| Rank | Lane | Name | Nationality | React | Time | Notes |
|---|---|---|---|---|---|---|
| 1 | 5 | Andrey Yepishin | Russia | 0.168 | 10.12 | Q, PB |
| 2 | 3 | Ronald Pognon | France | 0.152 | 10.14 | Q |
| 3 | 6 | Dariusz Kuć | Poland | 0.191 | 10.23 | Q |
| 4 | 1 | Dwain Chambers | United Kingdom | 0.140 | 10.25 | Q |
| 5 | 7 | Anatoliy Dovhal | Ukraine | 0.142 | 10.27 | SB |
| 6 | 2 | Łukasz Chyła | Poland | 0.135 | 10.30 | SB |
| 7 | 4 | Ángel David Rodríguez | Spain | 0.169 | 10.33 | |
| 8 | 8 | Jan Žumer | Slovenia | 0.160 | 10.43 | |

==== Semifinal 2 ====
| Rank | Lane | Name | Nationality | React | Time | Notes |
|---|---|---|---|---|---|---|
| 1 | 5 | Francis Obikwelu | Portugal | 0.205 | 10.19 | Q |
| 2 | 4 | Matic Osovnikar | Slovenia | 0.179 | 10.23 | Q, SB |
| 3 | 3 | Mark Lewis-Francis | United Kingdom | 0.149 | 10.30 | Q |
| 4 | 2 | Ronny Ostwald | Germany | 0.131 | 10.40 | Q |
| 5 | 7 | Marcin Jędrusiński | Poland | 0.166 | 10.43 | |
| 6 | 6 | Oudéré Kankarafou | France | 0.169 | 10.43 | |
| 7 | 1 | Erik Wijmeersch | Belgium | 0.144 | 10.47 | |
| 8 | 8 | Orkatz Beitia | Spain | 0.167 | 10.52 | |

=== Final ===
| Rank | Lane | Name | Nationality | React | Time | Notes |
|---|---|---|---|---|---|---|
| 1st place, gold medalist(s) | 5 | Francis Obikwelu | Portugal | 0.183 | 9.99 | CR, EL |
| 2nd place, silver medalist(s) | 6 | Andrey Yepishin | Russia | 0.148 | 10.10 | NR |
| 3rd place, bronze medalist(s) | 3 | Matic Osovnikar | Slovenia | 0.167 | 10.14 | NR |
| 4 | 4 | Ronald Pognon | France | 0.184 | 10.16 | |
| 5 | 1 | Mark Lewis-Francis | United Kingdom | 0.142 | 10.16 | SB |
| 6 | 7 | Dariusz Kuć | Poland | 0.171 | 10.21 | |
| 7 | 8 | Dwain Chambers | United Kingdom | 0.146 | 10.24 | |
| 8 | 2 | Ronny Ostwald | Germany | 0.126 | 10.38 | |
