= Ásdís Hjálmsdóttir =

Icelandic javelin thrower

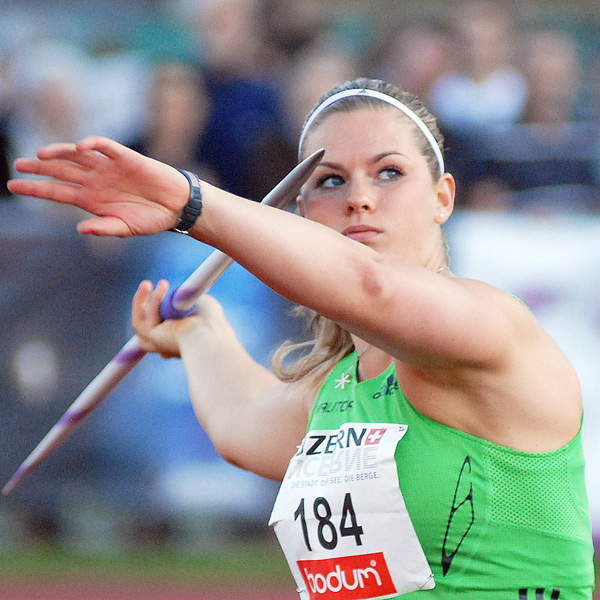
- Asdis Hjalmsdottir in 2012 at Spitzen Leichtathletik Luzern in Lucerne, Switzerland.

Personal information
- Born: 28 October 1985 (age 40) Reykjavík, Iceland

Sport
- Country: Iceland
- Sport: Athletics
- Event: Javelin
Medal record
Games of the Small States of Europe
Gold medal – first place	Andorra 2005	Discus throw
Gold medal – first place	Andorra 2005	Javelin throw
Gold medal – first place	Cyprus 2009	Javelin throw
Gold medal – first place	Luxembourg 2013	Javelin throw
Gold medal – first place	Iceland 2015	Javelin throw
Gold medal – first place	San Marino 2017	Javelin throw
Silver medal – second place	Monaco 2007	Discus throw
Silver medal – second place	Iceland 2015	Discus throw
Silver medal – second place	San Marino 2017	Shot put
- Updated on 6 June 2017

Ásdís Hjálmsdóttir (born 28 October 1985) is an Icelandic former javelin thrower.

== Biography ==
She represented her country at both 2008, 2012, and 2016 Olympic Games and has also competed at the 2006, 2010, 2012, 2014, 2016 European Championships and 2009, 2011, 2013, 2015 and 2017 World Championships.

Her personal best is 63.43 metres, achieved on 12 July 2017 in Joensuu, Finland. She is the current Icelandic record holder.

== Competition record ==
Year	Competition	Venue	Position	Event	Notes
Representing Iceland
2001	World Youth Championships	Debrecen, Hungary	14th	Javelin throw	36.39 m
2003	European Junior Championships	Tampere, Finland	19th	Javelin throw	42.23 m
2004	World Junior Championships	Grosseto, Italy	6th	Javelin throw	54.05 m
2005	Games of the Small States of Europe	Andorra la Vella, Andorra	3rd	Shot put	12.74 m
2005	Games of the Small States of Europe	Andorra la Vella, Andorra	1st	Discus throw	46.07 m
2005	Games of the Small States of Europe	Andorra la Vella, Andorra	1st	Javelin throw	57.05 m
2005	European U23 Championships	Erfurt, Germany	4th	Javelin throw	53.78 m
2006	European Championships	Gothenburg, Sweden	25th (q)	Javelin throw	51.33 m
2007	Games of the Small States of Europe	Fontvieille, Monaco	2nd	Discus throw	46.73 m
2008	Olympic Games	Beijing, China	50th (q)	Javelin throw	48.59 m
2009	Games of the Small States of Europe	Nicosia, Cyprus	1st	Javelin throw	58.93 m (GR)
2009	World Championships	Berlin, Germany	24th (q)	Javelin throw	55.86 m
2010	European Championships	Barcelona, Spain	10th	Javelin throw	54.32 m
2011	World Championships	Daegu, South Korea	13th (q)	Javelin throw	59.15 m
2012	European Championships	Helsinki, Finland	13th (q)	Javelin throw	55.29 m
2012	Olympic Games	London, United Kingdom	11th	Javelin throw	59.08 m
2013	Games of the Small States of Europe	Luxembourg, Luxembourg	1st	Javelin throw	56.15 m
2013	World Championships	Moscow, Russia	21st (q)	Javelin throw	57.65 m
2014	European Championships	Zürich, Switzerland	13th (q)	Javelin throw	56.36 m
2015	Games of the Small States of Europe	Reykjavík, Iceland	2nd	Discus throw	42.13 m
2015	Games of the Small States of Europe	Reykjavík, Iceland	1st	Javelin throw	58.85 m
2015	World Championships	Beijing, China	29th (q)	Javelin throw	56.72 m
2016	European Championships	Amsterdam, Netherlands	8th	Javelin throw	60.37 m
2016	Olympic Games	Rio de Janeiro, Brazil	30th (q)	Javelin throw	54.92 m
2017	Games of the Small States of Europe	Serravalle, San Marino	2nd	Shot put	15.39 m
2017	Games of the Small States of Europe	Serravalle, San Marino	1st	Javelin throw	60.93 m (GR)
2017	World Championships	London, United Kingdom	11th	Javelin throw	60.16 m
2018	European Championships	Berlin, Germany	13th (q)	Javelin throw	58.64 m

== Personal life ==
In end of 2020, Ásdís was infected with COVID-19 and was hospitalised for a week where she was put on a ventilator.

Olympic Games
Preceded by Örn Arnarson	Flagbearer for Iceland; London 2012	Succeeded by Thormodur Jonsson
