= Daniel Abenzoar-Foulé =

French-born athlete (born 1981)

Daniel Abenzoar-Foule (born 4 September 1981) is a retired French-born athlete who competed internationally for Luxembourg in the sprinting events. He represented that country at the 2005 World Championships and 2006 World Indoor Championships without qualifying for the second round.

He holds the Luxembourgian records in the 100 metres, as well as the indoor 60 and 200 metres.

== Competition record ==
Year	Competition	Venue	Position	Event	Notes
Representing France
2000	World Junior Championships	Santiago, Chile	20th (qf)	200 m	21.45 (wind: +0.5 m/s)
2000	World Junior Championships	Santiago, Chile	4th (h)	4 × 100 m relay	39.91
Representing Luxembourg
2003	Games of the Small States of Europe	Marsa, Malta	2nd	200 m	21.15
2003	Games of the Small States of Europe	Marsa, Malta	2nd	4 × 400 m	3:15.53
2003	European U23 Championships	Bydgoszcz, Poland	15th (h)	200 m	21.47 (wind: 0.3 m/s)
2005	Games of the Small States of Europe	Andorra la Vella, Andorra	1st	100 m	10.42
2005	Games of the Small States of Europe	Andorra la Vella, Andorra	1st	200 m	21.38
2005	Games of the Small States of Europe	Andorra la Vella, Andorra	2nd	4 × 100 m	41.32
2005	Games of the Small States of Europe	Andorra la Vella, Andorra	–	4 × 400 m	DQ
2005	World Championships	Helsinki, Finland	39th (h)	200 m	21.10
2005	Jeux de la Francophonie	Niamey, Niger	8th (sf)	100 m	10.57
2005	Jeux de la Francophonie	Niamey, Niger	5th	200 m	21.39
2006	World Indoor Championships	Moscow, Russia	25th (h)	60 m	6.76
2006	European Championships	Gothenburg, Sweden	23rd (qf)	100 m	10.59
2006	European Championships	Gothenburg, Sweden	17th (qf)	200 m	20.96
2007	Games of the Small States of Europe	Monaco	3rd	100 m	10.71
2007	Games of the Small States of Europe	Monaco	1st	200 m	21.42
2007	Games of the Small States of Europe	Monaco	–	4 × 100 m	DNF

== Personal bests ==
Outdoor

- 100 metres – 10.41 (+1.7 m/s) (Tomblaine 2006) =NR
- 200 metres – 20.89 (0.0 m/s) (Tomblaine 2006)

Indoor

- 60 metres – 6.76 (Moscow 2006) NR
- 200 metres – 21.12 (Luxembourg 2006) NR
