= Claude Godart =

Luxembourgish hurdler

Personal information
- Born: 20 October 1980 (age 44) Luxembourg City, Luxembourg
- Height: 1.86 m (6 ft 1 in)

Sport
- Sport: Athletics
- Event: 110 metres hurdles
- Club: CS Luxembourg
- Coached by: Marc Dollendorf

Claude Godart (born 20 October 1980) is a Luxembourgish athlete specialising in the sprint hurdles. He won multiple medals at the Games of the Small States of Europe.

His personal bests are 13.95 seconds in the 110 metres hurdles (+1.3 m/s, Dudelange 2007) and 8.03 seconds in the 60 metres hurdles (Kirchberg 2007). Both are current national records.

== International competitions ==
Year	Competition	Venue	Position	Event	Notes
Representing Luxembourg
1998	World Junior Championships	Annecy, France	25th (h)	110 m hurdles	14.75
1999	Games of the Small States of Europe	Liechtenstein	1st	4 × 400 m relay	3:19.29
1999	European Junior Championships	Riga, Latvia	17th (h)	400 m hurdles	54.97
2001	European U23 Championships	Amsterdam, Netherlands	22nd (h)	400 m hurdles	52.90
2003	Games of the Small States of Europe	Marsa, Malta	2nd	4 × 400 m relay	3:15.53
2005	Games of the Small States of Europe	Andorra la Vella, Andorra	1st	110 m hurdles	14.54
2005	Games of the Small States of Europe	Andorra la Vella, Andorra	2nd	4 × 100 m relay	41.32
2005	Games of the Small States of Europe	Andorra la Vella, Andorra	–	4 × 400 m relay	DQ
2007	European Indoor Championships	Birmingham, United Kingdom	26th (h)	60 m hurdles	8.13
2007	Games of the Small States of Europe	Fontvieille, Monaco	3rd	110 m hurdles	14.02
2007	Games of the Small States of Europe	Fontvieille, Monaco	3rd	4 × 400 m relay	3:18.65
2007	Universiade	Bangkok, Thailand	15th (h)	110 m hurdles	14.14
2009	Games of the Small States of Europe	Nicosia, Cyprus	2nd	110 m hurdles	14.22
2009	Games of the Small States of Europe	Nicosia, Cyprus	3rd	4 × 100 m relay	42.25
2009	Jeux de la Francophonie	Beirut, Lebanon	4th	110 m hurdles	14.21
2013	Games of the Small States of Europe	Luxembourg, Luxembourg	2nd	110 m hurdles	14.20
2013	Jeux de la Francophonie	Nice, France	6th	110 m hurdles	14.72
2015	Games of the Small States of Europe	Reykjavík, Iceland	3rd	400 m hurdles	14.72
