= Rachid Chouhal =

Personal information
- Nationality: Morocco
- Born: 14 February 1975 (age 51) Meknès, Morocco

Sport
- Country: Malta
- Sport: Athletics
- Events: long jump, 100 m, 200 m
Medal record
Games of the Small States of Europe
Silver medal – second place	2013 Luxembourg	4×100 metres relay
- Updated on 1 June 2013

Rachid Chouhal (born 14 February 1975 in Meknès, Morocco) is a Moroccan-born athlete representing Malta internationally who competes in the long jump and sprinting events. He came 4th in Heat 4 of the 100 metres Preliminaries at the 2012 Summer Olympics. He has won multiple medals for Malta at the Games of the Small States of Europe.

== Competition record ==
Year	Competition	Venue	Position	Event	Notes
Representing Malta
1999	Games of the Small States of Europe	Schaan, Liechtenstein	3rd	4 × 400 m relay	3:20.40
1999	World Championships	Seville, Spain	46th (h)	400 m	48.32 (NR)
2000	European Indoor Championships	Ghent, Belgium	30th (h)	60 m	6.85 (iNR)
2000	European Indoor Championships	Ghent, Belgium	23rd (q)	Long jump	7.10 m
2001	World Indoor Championships	Lisbon, Portugal	34th (h)	60 m	6.87
2001	Games of the Small States of Europe	Serravalle, San Marino	2nd	100 m	10.59
2001	Games of the Small States of Europe	Serravalle, San Marino	3rd	200 m	21.63
2001	Games of the Small States of Europe	Serravalle, San Marino	2nd	4 × 100 m relay	41.13
2001	World Championships	Edmonton, Canada	51st (h)	100 m	10.71
2001	Mediterranean Games	Radès, Tunisia	14th (h)	100 m	10.58
2001	Mediterranean Games	Radès, Tunisia	14th (q)	Long jump	7.34 m
2002	European Indoor Championships	Vienna, Austria	31st (h)	60 m	6.89
2002	European Indoor Championships	Vienna, Austria	27th (q)	Long jump	7.35 m (iNR)
2002	Commonwealth Games	Manchester, United Kingdom	11th	Long jump	NM
2002	European Championships	Munich, Germany	–	Long jump	NM
2003	Games of the Small States of Europe	Marsa, Malta	8th	100 m	11.33
2003	Games of the Small States of Europe	Marsa, Malta	6th	200 m	22.20
2003	Games of the Small States of Europe	Marsa, Malta	2nd	4 × 100 m relay	41.00
2003	Games of the Small States of Europe	Marsa, Malta	3rd	4 × 400 m relay	3:16.18
2003	Games of the Small States of Europe	Marsa, Malta	1st	Long jump	7.50 m
2005	European Indoor Championships	Madrid, Spain	29th (q)	Long jump	6.80 m
2005	Games of the Small States of Europe	Andorra la Vella, Andorra	6th	200 m	23.18
2005	Games of the Small States of Europe	Andorra la Vella, Andorra	1st	4 × 100 m relay	40.63
2005	Games of the Small States of Europe	Andorra la Vella, Andorra	2nd	Long jump	7.61 m
2005	Games of the Small States of Europe	Andorra la Vella, Andorra	2nd	Triple jump	14.57 m
2005	Mediterranean Games	Almería, Spain	7th	4 × 100 m relay	41.63
2005	Mediterranean Games	Almería, Spain	15th	Long jump	7.22 m
2007	Games of the Small States of Europe	Fontvieille, Monaco	2nd	4 × 100 m relay	41.08
2007	Games of the Small States of Europe	Fontvieille, Monaco	3rd	Long jump	7.26 m
2007	Games of the Small States of Europe	Fontvieille, Monaco	5th	Triple jump	14.35 m
2009	Games of the Small States of Europe	Nicosia, Cyprus	2nd	4 × 100 m relay	41.86
2011	Games of the Small States of Europe	Schaan, Liechtenstein	7th (h)	100 m	11.06
2011	Games of the Small States of Europe	Schaan, Liechtenstein	2nd	4 × 100 m relay	41.72
2011	Games of the Small States of Europe	Schaan, Liechtenstein	3rd	Long jump	6.97 m
2012	European Championships	Helsinki, Finland	30th (h)	100 m	10.86
2012	European Championships	Helsinki, Finland	–	200 m	DNF
2012	Olympic Games	London, United Kingdom	12th (p)	100 m	10.83
2013	Games of the Small States of Europe	Luxembourg, Luxembourg	2nd	4 × 100 m relay	41.91
2013	Games of the Small States of Europe	Luxembourg, Luxembourg	4th	Long jump	6.88 m
2015	European Indoor Championships	Prague, Czech Republic	35th (h)	60 m	7.06
