= Federico Gorrieri =

Sammarinese sprinter, triple jumper and long jumper

Federico Gorrieri (born 4 October 1985) is an athlete from San Marino who competes primarily in the horizontal jumps and sprinting events. He represented his country at one outdoor and three indoor World Championships.

== Competition record ==
Year	Competition	Venue	Position	Event	Notes
Representing San Marino
2001	Games of the Small States of Europe	Serravalle, San Marino	–	4 × 100 m relay	DQ
2001	Games of the Small States of Europe	Serravalle, San Marino	7th	Long jump	6.29 m
2001	World Youth Championships	Debrecen, Hungary	33rd (q)	Long jump	6.35 m
2003	Games of the Small States of Europe	Marsa, Malta	3rd	4 × 100 m relay	41.71 s
2003	Games of the Small States of Europe	Marsa, Malta	5th	Long jump	6.86 m
2003	Games of the Small States of Europe	Marsa, Malta	4th	Triple jump	14.71 m
2003	European Junior Championships	Tampere, Finland	16th (q)	Triple jump	14.08 m
2004	World Junior Championships	Grosseto, Italy	27th (q)	Long jump	6.78 m
2005	Games of the Small States of Europe	Andorra la Vella, Andorra	-	4 × 100 m relay	DQ
2005	Games of the Small States of Europe	Andorra la Vella, Andorra	6th	Long jump	6.99 m
2005	Games of the Small States of Europe	Andorra la Vella, Andorra	4th	Triple jump	14.30 m (w)
2007	European Indoor Championships	Birmingham, United Kingdom	19th (q)	Long jump	6.70 m
2007	Games of the Small States of Europe	Fontvieille, Monaco	4th	4 × 100 m relay	42.48 s
2007	Games of the Small States of Europe	Fontvieille, Monaco	6th	4 × 400 m relay	3:24.00
2007	Games of the Small States of Europe	Fontvieille, Monaco	8th	Long jump	6.71 m
2007	Games of the Small States of Europe	Fontvieille, Monaco	4th	Triple jump	14.42 m
2007	European U23 Championships	Debrecen, Hungary	20th (q)	Long jump	6.49 m
2007	Universiade	Bangkok, Thailand	35th (q)	Long jump	6.66 m
2008	World Indoor Championships	Valencia, Spain	56th (h)	60 m	7.49 s
2009	Games of the Small States of Europe	Nicosia, Cyprus	4th	Triple jump	14.13 m
2010	World Indoor Championships	Doha, Qatar	41st (h)	60 m	7.31 s
2011	European Indoor Championships	Paris, France	34th (h)	60 m	7.13 s
2011	Games of the Small States of Europe	Schaan, Liechtenstein	5th	100 m	11.04 s
2011	Games of the Small States of Europe	Schaan, Liechtenstein	3rd	4 × 100 m relay	42.21 s
2011	World Championships	Daegu, South Korea	18th (p)	100 m	11.42 s
2012	World Indoor Championships	Istanbul, Turkey	52nd (h)	60 m	7.54 s
2013	Games of the Small States of Europe	Luxembourg, Luxembourg	8th (h)	100 m	11.65 s
2013	Games of the Small States of Europe	Luxembourg, Luxembourg	4th	4 × 100 m relay	42.72 s
2015	Games of the Small States of Europe	Reykjavík, Iceland	5th	Long jump	6.83 m
2015	Games of the Small States of Europe	Reykjavík, Iceland	4th	Triple jump	13.52 m

== Personal bests ==
Outdoor

- 100 metres – 10.98 (2011)
- Long jump – 7.03 (+1.4 m/s) (Rieti 2004)
- Triple jump – 14.71 (+2.0 m/s) (Marsa 2003) NR

Indoor

- 60 metres – 7.04 (Ancona 2011)
- Long jump – 6.70 (Birmingham 2007)
- Triple jump – 14.59 (Ancona 2007)
