= Minas Alozidis =

Greek and Cypriot hurdler (born 1984)

Minás Alozídis (born 7 July 1984) is a Greek and Cypriot hurdler. He competes in the 200m and 400m hurdles events. Representing Greece, he finished 7th in the 400m hurdles final at the 2006 European Athletics Championships in Gothenburg. At the 2009 Games of the Small States of Europe, he won gold medals in the 400 metres hurdles and 4 x 400 metres relay, while representing Cyprus.
