= Ramona Papaioannou =

Cypriot sprinter (born 1989)

Personal information
- Nationality: Cypriot/Greek
- Born: 15 June 1989 (age 37) Cholargos, Greece
- Height: 1.72 m (5 ft 8 in)
- Weight: 60 kg (132 lb)

Sport
- Sport: Athletics
- Event(s): 100m, 200m

Anna Ramona Papaioannou (Greek: Άννα Ραμόνα Παπαϊωάννου, born 15 June 1989) is a Greek Cypriot sprinter. She competed in the 60 metres event at the 2014 IAAF World Indoor Championships. Her father is the Greek-Brazilian football player Pavlos Papaioannou.

Papaioannou is currently serving a three year competition ban to a doping violation after testing positive for anabolic steroids in June 2021. The ban is due to last until January 2025.

== International competitions ==
Year	Competition	Venue	Position	Event	Notes
Representing Cyprus
2005	Games of the Small States of Europe	Andorra la Vella, Andorra	3rd	400 m	58.10
2007	Games of the Small States of Europe	Fontvieille, Monaco	4th	400 m hurdles	62.29
2007	Games of the Small States of Europe	Fontvieille, Monaco	1st	4 × 400 m relay	3:45.17
2007	European Junior Championships	Hengelo, Netherlands	23rd (h)	400 m hurdles	63.52
2009	Games of the Small States of Europe	Nicosia, Cyprus	2nd	100 m	11.91
2009	Games of the Small States of Europe	Nicosia, Cyprus	2nd	200 m	24.65
2009	Games of the Small States of Europe	Nicosia, Cyprus	1st	4 × 100 m relay	45.98
2009	European U23 Championships	Kaunas, Lithuania	30th (h)	100 m	12.57
2011	Games of the Small States of Europe	Schaan, Liechtenstein	1st	100 m	11.86
2011	Games of the Small States of Europe	Schaan, Liechtenstein	2nd	200 m	24.27
2011	Games of the Small States of Europe	Schaan, Liechtenstein	2nd	4 × 100 m relay	47.08
2011	European U23 Championships	Ostrava, Czech Republic	12th (sf)	100 m	11.94
2011	European U23 Championships	Ostrava, Czech Republic	17th (h)	200 m	24.41
2013	European Indoor Championships	Gothenburg, Sweden	21st (h)	60 m	7.48
2013	Games of the Small States of Europe	Luxembourg, Luxembourg	1st	100 m	11.57
2013	Games of the Small States of Europe	Luxembourg, Luxembourg	1st	200 m	23.40
2013	Games of the Small States of Europe	Luxembourg, Luxembourg	1st	4 × 100 m relay	46.02
2013	Mediterranean Games	Mersin, Turkey	7th	100 m	11.89
2013	Mediterranean Games	Mersin, Turkey	5th	200 m	23.66
2013	Mediterranean Games	Mersin, Turkey	2nd	4 × 100 m relay	44.79
2014	World Indoor Championships	Sopot, Poland	30th (h)	60 m	7.43
2014	Commonwealth Games	Glasgow, United Kingdom	17th (sf)	100 m	11.61
2014	Commonwealth Games	Glasgow, United Kingdom	15th (sf)	200 m	23.87
2014	European Championships	Zürich, Switzerland	27th (h)	100 m	11.64
2014	European Championships	Zürich, Switzerland	23rd (h)	200 m	23.70^{1}
2015	World Championships	Beijing, China	24th (sf)	100 m	11.38
2015	World Championships	Beijing, China	34th (h)	200 m	23.30
2016	European Championships	Amsterdam, Netherlands	14th (sf)	100 m	11.55
2016	European Championships	Amsterdam, Netherlands	9th (h)	4 × 100 m relay	43.87
2016	Olympic Games	Rio de Janeiro, Brazil	45th (h)	100 m	11.61
2016	Olympic Games	Rio de Janeiro, Brazil	35th (h)	200 m	23.10
2017	European Indoor Championships	Belgrade, Serbia	24th (h)	60 m	7.48
2018	Commonwealth Games	Gold Coast, Australia	16th (sf)	100 m	11.67

^{1}Did not finish in the semifinals

== Personal bests ==
Outdoor

- 100 metres – 11.25 (+1.1 m/s, Nicosia 2016) NR
- 200 metres – 23.10 (+0.0 m/s, Rio de Janeiro 2016)

Indoor

- 60 metres – 7.33 (Piraeus 2014) NR
