= Ivan Borg =

Maltese sprinter

Ivan Borg (born 20 June 1984) is a retired Maltese track & field sprinter. He represented his country at GSSE, FISU and IAAF competitions from 2005 to 2013. At the 2006 GSSE, he was part of the Maltese 4 × 400 m team that won a silver medal.

His 10.71s 100m performance in Niort, France led the nation in 2010, and remains one of the fastest times clocked by a Maltese athlete over the distance.

He last competed in the 2013 Irish Collegiate Indoor Championships, for NUIG. Since his retirement from competition, Borg sporadically covers the sport in the media.
