= Bergur Ingi Pétursson =

Icelandic hammer thrower

Personal information
- Nationality: Iceland
- Born: 5 October 1985 (age 41) Reykjavík, Iceland
- Height: 1.91 m (6 ft 3 in)
- Weight: 125 kg (276 lb)

Sport
- Sport: Athletics
- Event: Hammer throw
- Club: FH Hafnarfjörður (ISL)
- Coached by: Eggert Bogason

Achievements and titles
- Personal best: Hammer throw: 74.48 m (2008)

Bergur Ingi Pétursson (born 3 October 1985 in Reykjavík) is an Icelandic hammer thrower. Petursson represented Iceland at the 2008 Summer Olympics in Beijing, where he competed for the men's hammer throw. He performed the best throw of 71.63 metres on his third and final attempt, finishing twenty-fifth overall in the qualifying rounds.
