= Alissa Kallinikou =

Cypriot sprinter (born 1985)

Personal information
- Nationality: Cyprus
- Born: 24 May 1985 (age 41) Hartlepool, Great Britain
- Height: 1.70 m (5 ft 7 in)
- Weight: 54 kg (119 lb)

Sport
- Sport: Athletics
- Event: Sprint
- Club: GSK Club

Achievements and titles
- Personal best: 400 m: 52.05 s (2008)

Alissa Kallinikou (Greek: Αλίσσα Καλλινίκου; born 24 May 1985) is a Cypriot sprinter, who specialized in the 400 metres. She set a personal best time of 52.05 seconds, by winning the women's 400 metres at the 2008 Greek National Championships in Athens, Greece, earning her a spot on the Cypriot team for the Olympics.

Kallinikou represented Cyprus at the 2008 Summer Olympics in Beijing, where she competed for the women's 400 metres. She ran in the seventh and final heat against seven other athletes, including Jamaica's Shericka Williams and Russia's Tatiana Firova. She finished the race in fifth place by four tenths of a second (0.40) ahead of Poland's Monika Bejnar, with a time of 52.40 seconds. Kallinikou, however, failed to advance into the semi-finals, as she placed twenty-sixth overall, and was ranked below three mandatory slots for the next round.

== Doping ban ==
Kallinkou tested positive for testosterone in July 2008, and was subsequently handed a two-year ban from sports. The analyse of the positive sample wasn't completed until after she had competed in the Olympic Games. Her results from the Olympics were annulled due to the anti-doping rule violation.
