= Ivano Bucci =

Sammarinese sprinter (born 1986)

Personal information
- Nationality: San Marino
- Born: 1 December 1986 (age 39)
- Height: 1.80 m (5 ft 11 in)
- Weight: 80 kg (176 lb)

Sport
- Sport: Athletics
- Event: 400 metres
- Club: La Fratellanza 1874 (ITA)

Achievements and titles
- Personal bests: 100 m: 10.93 s (2009); 400 m: 48.07 s (2007)
Medal record
Games of the Small States of Europe
Bronze medal – third place	2005 Andorra	4×400 metres relay

Ivano Bucci (born 1 December 1986) is a Sammarinese sprinter, who specialized in the 400 metres. Bucci participated in the 2008 Summer Olympics in Beijing. His sole medal was achieved in the 2005 Games of the Small States of Europe, when he was part of the San Marino team which won bronze in the 4 × 400 metres relay.

== Career ==
Bucci participated in the 2003 World Youth Championships in Athletics, held in Canada, at the start of his career. He was part of the San Marino team which won a bronze medal in the 4 × 400 metres relay at the 2005 Games of the Small States of Europe, held in Andorra. Bucci also took part in the 2007 Games, held in June of that year in Monaco. In September 2007 Bucci won the 400 metres in the San Marino national championship, crossing the line with a time of 49.35 seconds.

At the 2008 Summer Olympics, Bucci ran in the second heat of the men's 400 metres, against seven other athletes, including top favorite Chris Brown of the Bahamas, and Sweden's Johan Wissman. He finished the race in seventh place by two seconds behind Dominican Republic's Arismendy Peguero, with a seasonal best of 48.57 seconds. Bucci, however, failed to advance into the semi-finals, as he placed fifty-third overall, and was ranked farther below three mandatory slots for the next round.

Bucci was one of two Sammarinese athletes to take part in the 2010 European Athletics Championships in Barcelona. He ran a time of 49.03 seconds in the 400 metres qualifying, which wasn't enough to advance.

Bucci is a graduate of electrical engineering at the University of Modena, and also, a full-time member of La Fratellanza 1874 Track Club in his current residence Modena, Italy.
