= Mandy Charlet =

Luxembourgish sportsperson (born 1986)

Personal information
- Date of birth: 14 July 1986 (age 40)

International career
Years	Team	Apps	(Gls)
2011–2013	Luxembourg	9	(0)

Mandy Charlet (born 14 July 1986) is a Luxembourgish footballer and athlete.

As an athlete she won the bronze medal in the 100 metres hurdles and 4 × 400 metres relay at the 2005 Games of the Small States of Europe and also the bronze medal in the 100 metres hurdles at the 2007 Games of the Small States of Europe. She is the Luxembourgish national record holder in the Heptathlon with 5036 points set on 10–11 June 2006 in France, and in the Pentathlon with 3603 points set on 7 February 2006 in Switzerland. She has also competed in the javelin throw, shot put, long jump, high jump, 200 m, 800 m, and 60 m hurdles.

She was a member of the Luxembourg national team from 2011 to 2013. She played her first match on 5 March 2011.
