= Stella Christoforou =

Cypriot long-distance runner (born 1992)

Personal information
- Born: 2 March 1992 (age 33)

Sport
- Country: Cyprus
- Sport: Long-distance running

Stella Christoforou (born 2 March 1992) is a Cypriot long-distance runner. In 2020, she competed in the women's half marathon at the 2020 World Athletics Half Marathon Championships held in Gdynia, Poland.
