= Charlene Attard =

Maltese sprinter (born 1987)

Personal information
- Born: January 31, 1987 (age 39) Pietà, Malta

Sport
- Country: Malta
- Sport: Track and field
Medal record
Sprint
Representing Malta
Games of the Small States of Europe
| Silver medal – second place | 2007 Monaco | 100 m |

Charlene Maria Attard (born 31 January 1987 in Pietà) is a track and field sprint athlete who competes internationally for Malta. She represented Malta at the 2008 Summer Olympics in Beijing and is the first Maltese woman to run the 100m in under 12 seconds. Since 2021, she has been the Maltese Olympic Committee's Director of Sport.

== Early life and education ==
Attard was introduced to sports in 1991, at age four, through the organization Skolasport (now called #OnTheMove). She continued to be involved with the organization until she was a pre-teen, trying different sports like gymnastics and swimming. She was encouraged to take up athletics after a primary school teacher told Attard's parents she was a fast runner.

== Career ==
Attard began competing as a child "in long-distance events and road races", but at age 13 began competing in sprinting events.

Attard was a member of the Malta National Team from 2002 to 2015.

She has competed in the Games of the Small States of Europe six times, winning in total two gold, five silver and three bronze medals.

In 2007, Attard won four medals at the GSSE, including a silver medal in the women's 100m

Attard represented Malta at the 2008 Summer Olympics in Beijing. She competed at the 100 metres sprint and placed sixth in her heat without advancing to the second round. She ran the distance in a time of 12.20 seconds.

As of 2018, Attard worked as a PE teacher at a senior school in Sliema.

In 2021, Attard was nominated for the role of Director of Sport of the Maltese Olympic Committee. As of 2025, she continues to hold the position.

== Recognition and honours ==
The Malta Amateur Athletics Association named Attard Athlete of the Year in 2006, 2007, and 2008.

Personal life and family

Attard's older brother, Mark, is one of the leading sports journalists, football commentators and TV personalities in Malta, working for the Public Broadcasting Services, the company of the National TV Stations. He was also the Head of Communications at the Malta Football Association and the Press Officer of the Malta National A Football Team.
