= Mark Herrera =

Maltese born athlete (born 1984)

Personal information
- Born: 20 March 1984 (age 42) St. Venera, Malta
- Education: University of Malta
- Height: 172 cm (5 ft 8 in)
- Weight: 75 kg (165 lb)

Sport
- Country: Malta
- Sport: Sprinting, javelin throwing, steeplechasing, track and field
- Event(s): 400 metres, 800 metres, 1500 metres, 3000 metres, 3000 metres steeplechase, Javelin Throw
- Club: Pembroke Athleta

Mark Herrera (born 20 March 1984) is a Maltese born athlete who competes on behalf of the Republic of Malta. He is the Maltese 3000 metre steeplechase record holder. Herrera attended the University of Malta from which he graduated in 2006 with a B.Sc.(Hons) Information Technology.

== Personal bests ==
Outdoor

- 400 metres – 53.48 (Marsa, 25 June 2016)
- 400 metres Hurdles – 64.03 (Marsa, 26 June 2016)
- 800 metres – 1:54.43 (Marsa, 23 April 2005)
- 1500 metres – 3:56.20 (Erfurt, 15 July 2005)
- 3000 metres – 8:53.60 (Marsa, 25 February 2006)
- 3000 metres steeplechase – 9:31.78 (Marsa, 13 May 2015)
- Javelin Throw – 32.25 (Marsa, 25 June 2017)
