= Darren Gilford =

Maltese sprinter

Darren Gilford (born 11 December 1982) is a Maltese former sprinter who specialized in the 100 metres.

Participating in the 2004 Summer Olympics, he achieved fifth place in his 100 metres heat, thus failing to make it through to the second round.

His personal best time is 10.54 seconds, achieved in May 2005 in Marsa. He was coached by Jivko Jetchev.
