= Nikolai Portelli =

Maltese sprinter

Nikolai Portelli (born 17 December 1981) is a Maltese athlete. He competed in the 200 meters at the 2008 Summer Olympics failing to qualify for the second round. He finished 8th in Heat 4 with a time of 22.31 seconds.
