= Mike Schumacher =

Luxembourgish athletics competitor

Mike Schumacher (born May 21, 1986) is a track and field athlete who competed for Luxembourg in the 800 metres run at the 2009 World Championships in Athletics.
