= Silvia Felipo =

Andorran middle-distance runner

Personal information
- Full name: Silvia Felipo Suñe
- Nationality: Andorran
- Born: 4 February 1967 (age 59) Barcelona, Spain
- Height: 162 cm (5 ft 4 in)

Sport
- Country: Andorra
- Sport: Middle-distance running
- Event: 1500 metres

Silvia Felipo Suñe (Note: In this Catalan name, the first or paternal surname is Felipo and the second or maternal family name is Suñe; both are generally joined by the conjunction "i".) (born 4 February 1967) is an Andorran middle-distance runner. She competed in the 1500 metres at the 2000 Summer Olympics and the 2004 Summer Olympics.
