= List of 2013 Games of the Small States of Europe medal winners =

The 2013 Games of the Small States of Europe, also known as the XV Games of the Small States of Europe, were held in Luxembourg City and surrounding areas.

== Athletics ==
=== Men ===
Event	Gold		Silver		Bronze	
100 metres	Christos Chatziangelidis (CYP)	10.77	Michail Charalampous (CYP)	10.83	Kolbeinn Hödur Gunnarsson (ISL)	10.84
200 metres	Ivar Kristinn Jasonarson (ISL)	21.88	Christos Chatziangelidis (CYP)	21.89	Kriton Kyriakidis (CYP)	22.11
400 metres	Kevin Arthur Moore (MLT)	47.53	Ivar Kristinn Jasonarson (ISL)	48.05	Kolbeinn Hödur Gunnarsson (ISL)	48.21
800 metres	Amine Khadiri (CYP)	1:53.15	Brice Etès (MON)	1:54.05	Christophe Bestgen (LUX)	1:55.42
1500 metres	Amine Khadiri (CYP)	3:54.20	David Karonei (LUX)	3:54.80	Kais Adli (MON)	3:57.94
5000 metres	Pol Mellina (LUX)	14:29.82	Kári Steinn Karlsson (ISL)	14:33.41	Marcos Sanza (AND)	14:38.38
10,000 metres	Marcos Sanza (AND)	30:17.47	Pol Mellina (LUX)	30:26.46	Kári Steinn Karlsson (ISL)	30:41.14
110 metres hurdles	Milan Trajkovic (CYP)	14.03	Claude Godart (LUX)	14.20	Moïse Louisy-Louis (MON)	16.43
400 metres hurdles	Jacques Frisch (LUX)	52.28	Aris Xoufaridis (CYP)	54.28	Jamal Baaziz (MON)	58.08
3000 metres steeplechase	Zouhair Ouredi (MON)	9:18.71	Pascal Groben (LUX)	9:21.74	Josep Sansa (AND)	9:27.59
4×100 metres relay	Cyprus; Michail Charalampous; Christos Chatziangelidis; Vasilis Polykarpou; Filippos Spastris	41.71	Iceland; Kristinn Torfason; Kolbeinn Hödur Gunnarsson; Ivar Kristinn Jasonarson; Thorsteinn Ingvarsson	41.91	Malta; Luke Bezzina; Steve Camilleri; Rachid Chouhal; Andy Grech	41.98
4×400 metres relay	Cyprus; Kyriakos Antoniou; Georgios Avraam; Kriton Kyriakidis; Riginos Menelaou	3:13.55	Luxembourg; Jacques Frisch; Vincent Karger; Bob Lallemang; Tom Scholer	3:14.45	Malta; Neil Brimmer; Steve Camilleri; Matthew Croker; Kevin Arthur Moore	3:18.39
High jump	Vasilios Konstantinou (CYP)	2.12 m	Eugenio Rossi (SMR)	2.06 m	Kevin Rutare (LUX)	2.06 m
Pole vault	Nikandros Stylianou (CYP)	5.15 m	Sebastien Hoffelt (LUX)	5.00 m	Mark Johnson (ISL)	4.90 m
Long jump	Christodoulos Theofilou (CYP)	7.28 m	Kristinn Torfason (ISL)	7.27 m	Thorsteinn Ingvarsson (ISL)	7.14 m
Triple jump	Panagiotis Volou (CYP)	15.93 m	Zacharias Arnos (CYP)	15.53 m	Andy Grech (MLT)	15.05 m
Shot put	Danijel Furtula (MNE)	18.43 m	Óðinn Björn Þorsteinsson (ISL)	18.22 m	Bob Bertemes (LUX)	17.65 m
Discus throw	Danijel Furtula (MNE)	62.83 m GR	Apostolos Parellis (CYP)	59.11 m	Sven Forster (LUX)	50.30 m
Javelin throw	Gudmundur Sverrisson (ISL)	74.38 m	Örn Davidsson (ISL)	69.34 m	Antoine Wagner (LUX)	67.83 m

=== Women ===
Event	Gold		Silver		Bronze	
100 metres	Anna Ramona Papaioannou (CYP)	11.57	Tiffany Tshilumba (LUX)	11.99	Hafdis Sigurdardottir (ISL)	12.00
200 metres	Anna Ramona Papaioannou (CYP)	23.40	Hafdis Sigurdardottir (ISL)	23.82	Dimitra Kyriakidou (CYP)	24.37
400 metres	Aníta Hinriksdóttir (ISL)	54.29	Charline Mathias (LUX)	54.93	Kalliopi Kountouri (CYP)	56.46
800 metres	Aníta Hinriksdóttir (ISL)	2:04.60	Charline Mathias (LUX)	2:05.80	Martine Nobili (LUX)	2:06.57
1500 metres	Martine Nobili (LUX)	4:27.08	Natalia Evangelidou (CYP)	4:27.27	Jenny Gloden (LUX)	4:58.54
5000 metres	Slađana Perunović (MNE)	16:53.20	Elpida Christodoulidou (CYP)	17:36.07	Giselle Camilleri (MLT)	17:39.44
10,000 metres	Slađana Perunović (MNE)	35:21.21	Pascale Schmoetten (LUX)	37:04.37	Giselle Camilleri (MLT)	37:24.22
100 metres hurdles	Natalia Christofi (CYP)	14.32	Fjola Signy Hannesdóttir (ISL)	14.41	Barbara Rustignoli (SMR)	14.84
400 metres hurdles	Kim Reuland (LUX)	59.80	Stefanía Valdimarsdóttir (ISL)	1:00.86	Fjola Signy Hannesdóttir (ISL)	1:02.26
4×100 metres relay	Cyprus; Paraskevi Andreou; Dimitra Kyriakidou; Nikoletta Nikolettou; Anna Ramona Papaioannou	46.02	Iceland; Hrafnhild Eir Hermodsdottir; Maria Run Gunnlaugsdóttir; Hafdis Sigurdardottir; Sveinbjorg Zophoniasdottir	46.43	Luxembourg; Analis Bauer; Laurence Jones; Shanilla Mutumba; Tiffany Tshilumba	46.98
4×400 metres relay	Iceland; Fjola Signy Hannesdóttir; Aníta Hinriksdóttir; Hafdis Sigurdardottir; Stefanía Valdimarsdóttir	3:40.97	Luxembourg; Frédérique Hansen; Laurence Jones; Charline Mathias; Kim Reuland	3:44.38	Malta; Francesca Borg; Nicole Gatt; Janet Richard; Lara Scerri	3:54.97
High jump	Marija Vuković (MNE)	1.77 m	Elodie Tshilumba (LUX)	1.74 m	Stefani Razi (CYP)	1.71 m
Pole vault	Gina Reuland (LUX)	4.00 m	Edna Mari Semedo Monteiro (LUX); Maria Aristotelous (CYP)	3.60 m	not awarded	
Long jump	Nektaria Panayi (CYP)	6.07 m	Hafdis Sigurdardottir (ISL)	6.06 m	Eleftheria Christofi (CYP)	5.96 m
Triple jump	Eleftheria Christofi (CYP)	13.20 m	Rebecca Sare (MLT)	12.08 m	Malory Malgherini (MON)	11.40 m
Shot put	Florentia Kappa (CYP)	15.36 m	Stéphanie Krumlovsky (LUX)	12.97 m	Sveinbjorg Zophoniasdottir (ISL)	12.49 m
Javelin throw	Ásdís Hjálmsdóttir (ISL)	56.15 m	Inga Stasiulionytė (MON)	46.83 m	Maria Run Gunnlaugsdóttir (ISL)	46.44 m

== Basketball ==
Event	Gold	Silver	Bronze
Men	Cyprus	Luxembourg	Iceland
Women	Luxembourg	Iceland	Cyprus

== Cycling ==
=== Men ===
Event	Gold		Silver		Bronze	
Road race	Joël Zangerle (LUX)	3:07:41.852	Hans Burkhard (LIE)	3:14:51.087	Tom Thill (LUX)	3:14:52.632
Time trial	Stefan Küng (LIE)	26:41.31	Alex Kirsch (LUX)	27:43.74	Christian Helmig (LUX)	28:08.93
Mountain bike	Christian Helmig (LUX)	1:15:36	Marios Athanasiadis (CYP)	1:16:37	Christos Loizou (CYP)	1:19:10

=== Women ===
Event	Gold		Silver		Bronze	
Road race	Christine Majerus (LUX)	2:21:22.229	Nathalie Lamborelle (LUX)	2:21:53.554	Chantal Hoffmann (LUX)	2:21:54.150
Time trial	Christine Majerus (LUX)	15:02	Daniela Veronesi (SMR)	15:26	Antri Christoforou (CYP)	15:28
Mountain bike	Christine Majerus (LUX)	1:12:33	Isabelle Klein (LUX)	1:13:20	Daniela Veronesi (SMR)	1:14:50

== Gymnastics ==
=== Men ===
Event	Gold		Silver		Bronze	
Team All-around	Monaco; Julien Gobaux; Kévin Crovetto; Frédéric Unternaehr; Benjamin Niel; Lilian Piotte	233.495	Cyprus; Xenios Papaevripidou; Panagiotis Aristotelous; Michalis Krasias; Georgios Spanos; Herodotos Giorgallas	230.761	Iceland; Ólafur Gardar Gunnarsson; Robert Kristmannsson; Valgard Reinhardsson; Jón Sigurdur Gunnarsson; Pálmi Rafn Steindorsson	227.661
Parallel bars	Julien Gobaux (MON)	13.800	Sascha Palgen (LUX)	13.750	Vladimir Klimenko (LUX)	13.650
Floor	Sascha Palgen (LUX)	14.500	Vladimir Klimenko (LUX)	14.100	Robert Kristmannsson (ISL)	13.400
High bar	Vladimir Klimenko (LUX)	14.150	Julien Gobaux (MON)	13.850	Panagiotis Aristotelous (CYP)	13.500
Pommel horse	Vladimir Klimenko (LUX)	13.450	Julien Gobaux (MON)	13.150	Ólafur Gardar Gunnarsson (ISL)	12.550
Rings	Herodotos Georgallas (CYP)	14.750	Sascha Palgen (LUX)	14.400	Georgios Spanos (CYP)	14.100
Vault	Julien Gobaux (MON)	14.050	Vladimir Klimenko (LUX)	13.525	Kévin Crovetto (MON)	13.475

=== Women ===
Event	Gold		Silver		Bronze	
Team All-around	Iceland; Dominiqua Belanyi; Thelma Rut Hermannsdóttir; Norma Dogg Robertsdottir; Hildur Ólafsdóttir; Johanna Rakel Jónasdóttir	143.500	Luxembourg; Aline Bernar; Cindy Staar; Lisa Pastoret; Maite Baum; Christelle Timis	138.550	Cyprus; Lefki Louka; Rafaella Zannettou; Anastasia Theocharous; Coral Lee Dimitriadou; Eleni Eliades	135.950
Uneven bars	Dominiqua Belanyi (ISL)	12.300	Christelle Timis (LUX)	10.650	Thelma Rut Hermannsdóttir (ISL)	10.100
Beam	Ali Bernar (LUX)	12.600	Suzanne Buttigieg (MLT)	12.100	Norma Dogg Robertsdottir (ISL); Dominiqua Belanyi (ISL)	12.000
Floor	Dominiqua Belanyi (ISL)	12.250	Lefki Louka (CYP)	12.150	Aline Bernar (LUX)	12.050
Vault	Norma Dogg Robertsdottir (ISL)	13.625	Rafaella Zannettou (CYP)	13.225	Hildur Ólafsdóttir (ISL)	13.125

== Judo ==
=== Men ===
Event	Gold	Silver	Bronze
Extra-lightweight (60 kg)	Irodotos Kelpis (CYP)	Cédric Siccardi (MON)	not awarded
Half-lightweight (66 kg)	Nikola Gusić (MNE)	Jeremy Saywell (MLT)	Guillaume Ereseo (MON)
Lightweight (73 kg)	Daniel García González (AND)	Paolo Persoglia (SMR)	Murman Korchilava (MLT)
Lightweight (73 kg)	Daniel García González (AND)	Paolo Persoglia (SMR)	Matthias Rietzler (LIE)
Half-middleweight (81 kg)	Srđan Mrvaljević (MNE)	Sveinbjorn Jun Iura (ISL)	Jerome Mas (MON)
Half-middleweight (81 kg)	Srđan Mrvaljević (MNE)	Sveinbjorn Jun Iura (ISL)	Jean-Luc Muller (LUX)
Middleweight (90 kg)	Denis Leider (LUX)	Mirko Kaiser (LIE)	Isaac Bezzina (MLT)
Middleweight (90 kg)	Denis Leider (LUX)	Mirko Kaiser (LIE)	Þorvaldur Blondal (ISL)
Half-heavyweight (100 kg)	Karim Gharbi (SMR)	David Buchel (LIE)	Georges Simon (LUX)
Team	Luxembourg	Malta	Iceland
Team	Luxembourg	Malta	Monaco

=== Women ===
Event	Gold	Silver	Bronze
Half-lightweight (52 kg)	Marie Muller (LUX)	Nadine Thoeny (LIE)	Yamina Allag (MON)
Lightweight (57 kg)	Tanja Božović (MNE)	Judith Biedermann (LIE)	Joanna Camilleri (MLT)
Half-middleweight (63 kg)	Taylor King (LUX)	Laura Salles Lopez (AND)	Marcon Bezzina (MLT)
Middleweight (70 kg)	Lynn Mossong (LUX)	Tatjana Buchel (LIE)	not awarded
Team	Luxembourg	Liechtenstein	Malta

== Shooting ==
=== Men ===
Event	Gold		Silver		Bronze	
Air Pistol	Tomas Videro (ISL)	201.7	Ásgeir Sigurgeirsson (ISL)	197.4	Paolo Cecchini (SMR)	172.7
Air Rifle	Marc-Andre Kessler (LIE)	201.3	Eric Lanza (MON)	195.9	Gudmundur Christensen (ISL)	172.5
Trap	Adonis Mylonas (CYP)		Marios Sophocleous (CYP)		Lyndon Sosa (LUX)	

=== Women ===
Event	Gold		Silver		Bronze	
Air Pistol	Eleanor Bezzina (MLT)	191.2	Jorunn Hardardóttir (ISL)	187.6	Nancy Jans (LUX)	165.7
Air Rifle	Artemis Panteli (CYP)	203.3	Julia Berginz (LIE)	199.7	Carole Calmes (LUX)	178.1

== Swimming ==
=== Men ===
Event	Gold		Silver		Bronze	
50 m freestyle	Alexandre Bakhtiarov (CYP)	23.45	Andrew Chetcuti (MLT)	23.50	Omiros Zagkas (CYP)	23.54
100 m freestyle	Jean-François Schneiders (LUX)	50.88	Omiros Zagkas (CYP)	51.37	Andrew Chetcuti (MLT)	51.61
200 m freestyle	Jean-François Schneiders (LUX)	1:53.06	Anton Sveinn McKee (ISL)	1:54.27	Iacovos Hadjiconstantinou (CYP)	1:55.50
400 m freestyle	Anton Sveinn McKee (ISL)	3:59.25	Pit Brandenburger (LUX)	4:03.41	Iacovos Hadjiconstantinou (CYP)	4:05.58
1500 m freestyle	Anton Sveinn McKee (ISL)	16:11.97	Christophe Meier (LIE)	16:17.76	Amor Stefánsson (ISL)	16:22.90
100 m backstroke	Jean-François Schneiders (LUX)	56.33	David Hildiberg Dalsteinsson (ISL)	57.91	Sebastian Konnaris (CYP)	58.86
200 m backstroke	Jean-François Schneiders (LUX)	2:01.71	Kristinn Thorarinsson (ISL)	2:09.34	Kolbeinn Hfrafnkelsson (ISL)	2:10.64
100 m breaststroke	Anton Sveinn McKee (ISL)	1:03.17	Hrafn Traustason (ISL)	1:05.21	Francois-Xavier Paquot (MON)	1:05.35
200 m breaststroke	Anton Sveinn McKee (ISL)	2:16.97	Hrafn Traustason (ISL)	2:19.56	Christophe Meier (LIE)	2:21.06
100 m butterfly	Alexandre Bakhtiarov (CYP)	55.12	Andrew Chetcuti (MLT)	55.58	Daníel Hannes Pálsson (ISL)	57.14
200 m butterfly	Christophe Meier (LIE)	2:05.44	Daníel Hannes Pálsson (ISL)	2:06.61	Louis Gloesener (LUX)	2:09.10
200 m individual medley	Anton Sveinn McKee (ISL)	2:05.94	Christophe Meier (LIE)	2:06.46	Thomas Tsiopanis (CYP)	2:09.32
400 m individual medley	Anton Sveinn McKee (ISL)	4:27.29	Christophe Meier (LIE)	4:27.97	Laurent Carnol (LUX)	4:34.01
4×100 m freestyle relay	Luxembourg; Pit Brandenburger; Julien Henx; Jean-François Schneiders; Raphaël Stacchiotti	3:24.75	Cyprus; Alexandre Bakhtiarov; Thomas Tsiopanis; Sebastian Konnaris; Omiros Zagkas	3:28.81	Iceland; David Hildiberg Adalsteinsson; Anton Sveinn McKee; Alexander Johannesson; Aron Örn Stefánsson	3:29.00
4×200 m freestyle relay	Luxembourg; Pit Brandenburger; Julien Henx; Jean-François Schneiders; Raphaël Stacchiotti	7:34.08	Iceland; David Hildiberg Adalsteinsson; Anton Sveinn McKee; Daníel Hannes Pálsson; Aron Örn Stefánsson	7:39.15	Cyprus; Alexandre Bakhtiarov; Iacovos Hadjiconstantinou; Sebastian Konnaris; Omiros Zagkas	8:00.53
4×100 m medley relay	Luxembourg; Pit Brandenburger; Julien Henx; Jean-François Schneiders; Raphaël Stacchiotti	3:47.61	Iceland; David Hildiberg Adalsteinsson; Anton Sveinn McKee; Daníel Hannes Pálsson; Aron Örn Stefánsson	3:47.72	Cyprus; Alexandre Bakhtiarov; Sebastian Konnaris; Lefkios Xanthhou; Omiros Zagkas	3:54.76

=== Women ===
Event	Gold		Silver		Bronze	
50 m freestyle	Julie Meynen (LUX)	25.59	Ingibjorg Kristin Jansdottir (ISL)	26.08	Karen Sif Vilhjálmsdóttir (ISL)	26.39
100 m freestyle	Julie Meynen (LUX)	56.19	Ingibjorg Kristin Jansdottir (ISL)	57.39	Julia Hassler (LIE)	57.77
200 m freestyle	Eygló Ósk Gústafsdóttir (ISL)	2:02.44	Julia Hassler (LIE)	2:02.57	Julie Meynen (LUX)	2:03.16
400 m freestyle	Julia Hassler (LIE)	4:17.71	Monique Olivier (LUX)	4:20.44	Inga Elin Cryer (ISL)	4:24.73
800 m freestyle	Julia Hassler (LIE)	8:45.09	Monique Olivier (LUX)	8:59.50	Inga Elin Cryer (ISL)	9:09.35
100 m backstroke	Eygló Ósk Gústafsdóttir (ISL)	1:02.89	Ingibjorg Kristin Jansdottir (ISL)	1:04.47	Sarah Rolko (LUX)	1:05.51
200 m backstroke	Eygló Ósk Gústafsdóttir (ISL)	2:15.21	Jóhanna Gústafsdóttir (ISL)	2:18.04	Sarah Rolko (LUX)	2:19.11
100 m breaststroke	Hrafnhildur Lúthersdóttir (ISL)	1:11.11	Theresa Banzer (LIE)	1:13.40	Irene Chrysostomou (CYP)	1:13.42
200 m breaststroke	Hrafnhildur Lúthersdóttir (ISL)	2:31.28	Theresa Banzer (LIE)	2:34.91	Irene Chrysostomou (CYP)	2:38.88
100 m butterfly	Julia Hassler (LIE)	1:02.28	Julie Meynen (LUX)	1:02.51	Johanna Gerda Gústafsdóttir (ISL)	1:02.92
200 m butterfly	Julia Hassler (LIE)	2:15.96	Inga Elín Cryer (ISL)	2:21.45	Jasmin Buechel (LIE)	2:29.76
200 m individual medley	Hrafnhildur Lúthersdóttir (ISL)	2:17.27	Eygló Ósk Gústafsdóttir (ISL)	2:20.99	Monique Olivier (LUX)	2:23.47
400 m individual medley	Johanna Gerda Gústafsdóttir (ISL)	4:54.57	Eygló Ósk Gústafsdóttir (ISL)	4:55.17	Julia Hassler (LIE)	5:02.55
4×100 m freestyle relay	Iceland; Eygló Ósk Gústafsdóttir; Ingibjorg Kristin Jansdottir; Hrafnhildur Lúthersdóttir; Karen Sif Vilhjálmsdóttir	3:49.75	Luxembourg; Jacqueline Banky; Julie Meynen; Monique Olivier; Sarah Rolko	3:52.69	Liechtenstein; Theresa Banzer; Jasmin Buechel; Julia Hassler; Tamara Vetsch	4:00.69
4×200 m freestyle relay	Iceland; Inga Elin Cryer; Eygló Ósk Gústafsdóttir; Johanna Gerda Gústafsdóttir; Hrafnhildur Lúthersdóttir	8:25.24	Luxembourg; Jacqueline Banky; Julie Meynen; Monique Olivier; Christina Roch	8:28.24	Liechtenstein; Theresa Banzer; Jasmin Buechel; Julia Hassler; Celina Kind	8:43.34
4×100 m medley relay	Iceland; Eygló Ósk Gústafsdóttir; Johanna Gerda Gústafsdóttir; Ingibjorg Kristin Jansdottir; Hrafnhildur Lúthersdóttir	4:12.96	Luxembourg; Jil Einhorn; Julie Meynen; Christina Roch; Sarah Rolko	4:23.22	Cyprus; Irene Chrysostomou; Sofina Neofytou; Chrysoula Karamanou; Sofia Papadopoulou	4:23.78

== Table Tennis ==
=== Men ===
Event	Gold	Silver	Bronze
Singles	Irfan Ćekić (MNE)	Traian Ciociu (LUX)	Marios Yiangou (CYP)
Singles	Irfan Ćekić (MNE)	Traian Ciociu (LUX)	Anthony Peretti (MON)
Doubles	Luxembourg; Mike Bast; Gilles Michely	Monaco; Anthony Peretti; David Samson	Montenegro; Irfan Ćekić; Viktor Rogić
Team	Luxembourg; Mike Bast; Traian Ciociu; Gilles Michely	Monaco; Anthony Peretti; David Samson; Martin Tiso	Malta; Daniel Bajada; Simon Gerada

=== Women ===
Event	Gold	Silver	Bronze
Singles	Sarah de Nutte (LUX)	Letizia Giardi (SMR)	Kouiza Kourea (CYP)
Singles	Sarah de Nutte (LUX)	Letizia Giardi (SMR)	Tessy Gonderinger (LUX)
Doubles	Luxembourg; Ni Xialian; Sarah de Nutte	Malta; Viktoria Lucenkova; Lu Pengfei	Monaco; Ulrika Quist; Lauren Riley
Team	Luxembourg; Ni Xialian; Sarah de Nutte; Tessy Gonderinger	Malta; Viktoria Lucenkova; Lu Pengfei; Jessica Pace	Monaco; Ulrika Quist; Lauren Riley

== Tennis ==
Event	Gold	Silver	Bronze
Men's Singles	(Monaco) Thomas Oger	(Cyprus) Petros Chrysochos	(Luxembourg) Mike Scheidweiler
Men's Singles	(Monaco) Thomas Oger	(Cyprus) Petros Chrysochos	(Luxembourg) Ugo Nastasi
Women's Singles	(Liechtenstein) Stephanie Vogt	(Liechtenstein) Kathinka von Deichmann	(Luxembourg) Tiffany Cornelius
Women's Singles	(Liechtenstein) Stephanie Vogt	(Liechtenstein) Kathinka von Deichmann	(Luxembourg) Laura Correia
Men's Doubles	(Monaco) Guillaume Couillard (Monaco) Thomas Oger	(Luxembourg) Ugo Nastasi (Luxembourg) Mike Scheidweiler	(Cyprus) Petros Chrysochos (Cyprus) Sergis Kyratzis
Men's Doubles	(Monaco) Guillaume Couillard (Monaco) Thomas Oger	(Luxembourg) Ugo Nastasi (Luxembourg) Mike Scheidweiler	(San Marino) Marco de Rossi (San Marino) Stefano Galvani
Women's Doubles	(Liechtenstein) Stephanie Vogt (Liechtenstein) Kathinka von Deichmann	(Malta) Roseanne Dimech (Malta) Elaine Genovese	(Luxembourg) Laura Correia (Luxembourg) Sharon Pesch
Mixed Doubles	(Liechtenstein) Stephanie Vogt (Liechtenstein) Timo Kranz	(Malta) Elaine Genovese (Malta) Matthew Asciak	(Luxembourg) Tiffany Cornelius (Luxembourg) Laurent Bram
Mixed Doubles	(Liechtenstein) Stephanie Vogt (Liechtenstein) Timo Kranz	(Malta) Elaine Genovese (Malta) Matthew Asciak	(Monaco) Louise-Alice Gambarini (Monaco) Benjamin Balleret

== Volleyball ==
=== Indoor ===
Event	Gold	Silver	Bronze
Men	Cyprus	Luxembourg	Monaco
Women	Cyprus	Luxembourg	San Marino

=== Beach ===
Event	Gold	Silver	Bronze
Men	Liechtenstein	Cyprus	Andorra
Women	Cyprus	Luxembourg	Liechtenstein

== See also ==
- List of 2015 Games of the Small States of Europe medal winners
