= Athletics at the 2011 Games of the Small States of Europe =

- Dates: 1 – 4 June
- Host city: Schaan, Liechtenstein
- Venue: Sportplatz Rheinwiese
- Events: 36
- Participation: 135 athletes from 9 nations

Athletics at the 2011 Games of the Small States of Europe were held from 1 – 4 June 2011 at the Rheinwiese Schaan.

== Medal summary ==
=== Men ===
Event	Gold		Silver		Bronze	
100 metres	Panagiotis Ioannou (CYP)	10.60	Yoann Bebon (LUX)	10.82	Anthos Christofides (CYP)	10.84
200 metres	Panagiotis Ioannou (CYP)	21.46	Anthos Christofides (CYP)	21.75	Owen Lee Camilleri (MLT)	21.90
400 metres	Kevin Arthur Moore (MLT)	47.68	Brice Etes (MON)	48.63	Kyriakos Antoniou (CYP)	48.74
800 metres	Brice Etes (MON)	1:52.31	Amine Khadiri (CYP)	1:52.53	Christos Dimitriou (CYP)	1:52.55
1500 metres	Amine Khadiri (CYP)	3:50.31	Christos Dimitriou (CYP)	3:52.75	Pol Mellina (LUX)	3:54.23
5000 metres	Pol Mellina (LUX)	14:42.20	Antoni Bernadó (AND)	14:46.15	Marcos Sanza (AND)	14:50.24
10,000 metres	Antoni Bernadó (AND)	30:57.70	Marcos Sanza (AND)	31:03.07	Vincent Nothum (LUX)	32:03.10
110 metres hurdles	Alexandros Stavrides (CYP)	14.04	Haris Koutras (CYP)	14.28	Einar Dadi Larusson (ISL)	14.56
400 metres hurdles	Aris Xoufaridis (CYP)	52.91	Bjorgvin Vikingsson (ISL)	53.08	Andreas Silvestros (CYP)	53.86
3000 metres steeplechase	Pascal Groben (LUX)	9:25.21	Josep Sansa (AND)	9:29.27	Jamal Baaziz (MON)	9:33.99
4×100 metres relay	Cyprus; Antreas Michail; Anthos Christofides; Vasilis Polykarpou; Panagiotis Ioannou	41.53	Malta; Andy Grech; Rachid Chouhal; Owen Lee Camilleri; Karl Farrugia	41.72	San Marino; Santos Nicolas Bollini; Ivano Bucci; Federico Gorrieri; Enrico Morganti	42.21
4×400 metres relay	Cyprus; Stefanos Anastasiou; Aris Xoufaridis; Riginos Menelaou; Kyriakos Antoniou	3:14.02	Malta; Neil Brimmer; Karl Farrugia; James D'Alfonso; Kevin Arthur Moore	3:15.73	Monaco; Jules Andrieu; Pierre-Marie Arnaud; Rémy Charpentier; Brice Etes	3:20.10
High jump	Emilios Xenophontos (CYP)	2.12 m	Eugenio Rossi (SMR)	2.03 m	Marios Nikolaou (CYP)	2.03 m
Pole vault	Nikandros Stylianou (CYP)	5.00 m	Andreas Efstathiou (CYP)	4.70 m	Einar Dadi Larusson (ISL)	4.60 m
Long jump	Kristinn Torfason (ISL)	7.67 m	Zacharias Arnos (CYP)	7.53 m	Rachid Chouhal (MLT)	6.97 m
Triple jump	Zacharias Arnos (CYP)	15.98 m	Panagiotis Volou (CYP)	15.91 m	not awarded	
Shot put	Ódinn Björn Thorsteinsson (ISL)	19.73 m	Georgios Arestis (CYP)	17.80 m	Bob Bertemes (LUX)	16.75 m
Discus throw	Apostolos Parellis (CYP)	59.73 m	Danilo Ristić (MNE)	45.98 m	Orn Davidsson (ISL)	45.67 m
Javelin throw	Antoine Wagner (LUX)	69.13 m	Orn Davidsson (ISL)	67.16 m	René Michlig (LIE)	65.54 m

=== Women ===
Event	Gold		Silver		Bronze	
100 metres	Anna Papaioannou (CYP)	11.86	Diane Borg (MLT)	11.89	Tiffany Tshilumba (LUX)	12.01
200 metres	Diane Borg (MLT)	24.27	Anna Papaioannou (CYP)	24.27	Hrafnhild Hermodsdottir (ISL)	24.58
400 metres	Arna Gudmundsdóttir (ISL)	55.73	Frédérique Hansen (LUX)	56.38	Nicole Gatt (MLT)	57.07
800 metres	Meropi Panagiotou (CYP)	2:10.52	Stella Christoforou (CYP)	2:12.74	Martine Mellina (LUX)	2:13.41
1500 metres	Meropi Panagiotou (CYP)	4:36.91	Aurélie Glowacz (MON)	4:42.26	Martine Mellina (LUX)	4:49.12
5000 metres	Sladana Perunović (MNE)	17:39.70	Lisa Marie Bezzina (MLT)	17:48.90	Pascale Schmoetten (LUX)	17:54.12
10,000 metres	Sladana Perunović (MNE)	36:00.48	Lisa Marie Bezzina (MLT)	36:51.86	Pascale Schmoetten (LUX)	36:55.16
100 metres hurdles	Dimitra Arachoviti (CYP)	13.37	Arna Gudmundsdóttir (ISL)	15.32	Barbara Rustignoli (SMR)	15.34
400 metres hurdles	Kim Reuland (LUX)	1:01.47	Stefanía Valdimarsdóttir (ISL)	1:03.76	Polyxeni Irodotou (CYP)	1:03.77
4×100 metres relay	Malta; Martina Xuereb; Charlene Attard; Diane Borg; Rebecca Camilleri	46.30	Cyprus; Dimitra Arachoviti; Theodosia Christou; Nikoletta Nikolettou; Anna Papaioannou	47.08	Iceland; Arna Gudmundsdóttir; Hafdis Sigurdardottir; Dóróthea Jóhannesdóttir; Hrafnhild Hermodsdottir	47.09
4×400 metres relay	Malta; Francesca Xuereb; Charlene Attard; Celine Pace; Nicole Gatt	3:49.95	Luxembourg; Frédérique Hansen; Anaïs Bauer; Carole Kill; Kim Reuland	3:51.50	Cyprus; Rafaela Demetriou; Nikoletta Nikolettou; Polyxeni Irodotou; Par Thrasyvoulou	4:07.92
High jump	Marija Vuković (MNE)	1.86 m	Leontia Kallenou (CYP)	1.77 m	Sveinbjorg Zophoniasdottir (ISL)	1.68 m
Pole vault	Edna Semedo Monteiro (LUX)	3.80 m	Stéphanie Vieillevoye (LUX)	3.70 m	Anna Foitdou (CYP)	3.70 m
Long jump	Nektaria Panayi (CYP)	6.35 m	Rebecca Camilleri (MLT)	6.21 m	Hafdis Sigurdardottir (ISL)	6.09 m
Triple jump	Nina Mitkova Serbezova (CYP)	13.63 m	Eleftheria Christofi (CYP)	13.00 m	Alessandra Pace (MLT)	11.84 m
Shot put	Florentia Kappa (CYP)	14.32 m	Zacharoula Georgiadou (CYP)	13.47 m	Sve Zophoniasdottir (ISL)	12.35 m
Discus throw	Zacharoula Georgiadou (CYP)	49.98 m	Androniki Lada (CYP)	48.18 m	Veronika Längle-Meier (LIE)	41.37 m

== Men's results ==
=== 100 metres ===
Heats – June 1
Wind:
Heat 1: +1.8 m/s, Heat 2: +1.1 m/s

Rank	Heat	Name	Nationality	Time	Notes
1	1	Panagiotis Ioannu	Cyprus	10.55	Q
2	1	Yoann Bebon	Luxembourg	10.81	Q
3	2	Anthos Christofides	Cyprus	10.89	Q
4	1	Federico Gorrieri	San Marino	10.98	Q
5	1	Kristinn Torfason	Iceland	11.02	Q
6	1	Karl Farrugia	Malta	11.04	Q
7	2	Rachid Chouhal	Malta	11.06	
8	2	Ivar Kristinn Jasonarson	Iceland	11.09	
9	2	Mikel de Sa	Andorra	11.32	

Final – June 1
Wind:
+1.3 m/s

Rank	Lane	Name	Nationality	Time	Notes
1st place, gold medalist(s)	3	Panagiotis Ioannu	Cyprus	10.60	
2nd place, silver medalist(s)	4	Yoann Bebon	Luxembourg	10.82	
3rd place, bronze medalist(s)	5	Anthos Christofides	Cyprus	10.84	
4	1	Karl Farrugia	Malta	10.94	
5	2	Federico Gorrieri	San Marino	11.04	
5	6	Kristinn Torfason	Iceland	11.04	

=== 200 metres ===
Heats – June 3
Wind:
Heat 1: +1.1 m/s, Heat 2: +1.4 m/s

Rank	Heat	Name	Nationality	Time	Notes
1	1	Anthos Christofides	Cyprus	21.65	Q
2	2	Panagiotis Ioannu	Cyprus	21.75	Q
3	1	Ivar Kristinn Jasonarson	Iceland	21.96	Q
4	1	Owen Camilleri	Malta	22.02	Q
5	2	Yoann Bebon	Luxembourg	22.06	Q
6	1	Mikel de Sa	Andorra	22.88	Q
7	2	Fabian Haldner	Liechtenstein	22.95	
8	1	Rémy Charpentier	Monaco	23.06	
9	2	Jules Andrieu	Monaco	23.72	

Final – June 4
Wind:
+0.7 m/s

Rank	Lane	Name	Nationality	Time	Notes
1st place, gold medalist(s)	4	Panagiotis Ioannu	Cyprus	21.46	
2nd place, silver medalist(s)	3	Anthos Christofides	Cyprus	21.75	
3rd place, bronze medalist(s)	6	Owen Camilleri	Malta	21.90	
4	5	Ivar Kristinn Jasonarson	Iceland	22.05	
5	1	Yoann Bebon	Luxembourg	22.27	
6	2	Mikel de Sa	Andorra	23.37	

=== 400 metres ===
Heats – June 1

Rank	Heat	Name	Nationality	Time	Notes
1	1	Kevin Arthur Moore	Malta	48.41	Q
2	2	Kyriakos Antoniou	Cyprus	48.55	Q
3	1	Riginos Menelaou	Cyprus	49.01	Q
4	2	Brice Etès	Monaco	49.09	Q
5	2	James d'Alfonso	Malta	49.29	Q
6	1	Sven Fischer	Luxembourg	49.35	Q
7	1	Pierre-Marie Arnaud	Monaco	50.73	
8	2	Fabian Haldner	Liechtenstein	51.85	
	1	Einar Dadi Larusson	Iceland	DNS	
	2	Ivano Bucci	San Marino	DNS	

Final – June 3

Rank	Lane	Name	Nationality	Time	Notes
1st place, gold medalist(s)	4	Kevin Arthur Moore	Malta	47.68	NR
2nd place, silver medalist(s)	5	Brice Etès	Monaco	48.63	NR
3rd place, bronze medalist(s)	3	Kyriakos Antoniou	Cyprus	48.74	
4	2	Sven Fischer	Luxembourg	48.82	
5	1	James d'Alfonso	Malta	49.26	
	6	Riginos Menelaou	Cyprus	DQ	

=== 800 metres ===
June 1

Rank	Name	Nationality	Time	Notes
1st place, gold medalist(s)	Brice Etès	Monaco	1:52.31	
2nd place, silver medalist(s)	Amine Khadiri	Cyprus	1:52.53	
3rd place, bronze medalist(s)	Christos Dimitriou	Cyprus	1:52.55	
4	David Fiegen	Luxembourg	1:52.82	
5	David Karonei	Luxembourg	1:54.08	
6	Malik Díaz	Monaco	1:54.70	
	Victor Martínez Julia	Andorra	DNF	

=== 1500 metres ===
June 4

Rank	Name	Nationality	Time	Notes
1st place, gold medalist(s)	Amine Khadiri	Cyprus	3:50.31	
2nd place, silver medalist(s)	Christos Dimitriou	Cyprus	3:52.75	
3rd place, bronze medalist(s)	Pol Mellina	Luxembourg	3:54.23	
4	David Karonei	Luxembourg	3:47.28	
5	Kais Adli	Monaco	4:00.87	
6	Jean-Marc Léandro	Monaco	4:01.34	
7	Mark Herrera	Malta	4:08.58	

=== 5000 metres ===
June 1

Rank	Name	Nationality	Time	Notes
1st place, gold medalist(s)	Pol Mellina	Luxembourg	14:42.20	
2nd place, silver medalist(s)	Antoni Bernadó	Andorra	14:46.15	
3rd place, bronze medalist(s)	Marcos Sanza	Andorra	14:50.24	
4	Kassahun Jebel Ahmed	Cyprus	14:52.98	
5	Marcel Tschopp	Liechtenstein	15:48.15	
	Antoine Berlin	Monaco	DNF	
	Jean-Marc Léandro	Monaco	DNF	

=== 10,000 metres ===
June 4

Rank	Name	Nationality	Time	Notes
1st place, gold medalist(s)	Antoni Bernadó	Andorra	30:57.70	
2nd place, silver medalist(s)	Marcos Sanza	Andorra	31:03.07	
3rd place, bronze medalist(s)	Vincent Nothum	Luxembourg	32:03.10	
4	Marcel Tschopp	Liechtenstein	32:44.74	
	Kassahun Jebel Ahmed	Cyprus	DNF	
	Jamal Baaziz	Monaco	DNF	
	Antoine Berlin	Monaco	DNS	

=== 110 metres hurdles ===
June 3
Wind: 0.0 m/s

Rank	Lane	Name	Nationality	Time	Notes
1st place, gold medalist(s)	4	Alexandros Stavrides	Cyprus	14.04	
2nd place, silver medalist(s)	5	Haris Koutras	Cyprus	14.28	
3rd place, bronze medalist(s)	3	Einar Dadi Larusson	Iceland	14.56	
4	6	Moïse Louisy-Louis	Monaco	16.03	
	2	Claude Godart	Luxembourg	DNS	

=== 400 metres hurdles ===
June 3

Rank	Lane	Name	Nationality	Time	Notes
1st place, gold medalist(s)	6	Aris Xoufaridis	Cyprus	52.91	
2nd place, silver medalist(s)	4	Bjorgvin Vikingsson	Iceland	53.08	
3rd place, bronze medalist(s)	5	Andreas Silvestros	Cyprus	53.86	
	3	Claude Godart	Luxembourg	DNS	

=== 3000 metres steeplechase ===
June 3

Rank	Name	Nationality	Time	Notes
1st place, gold medalist(s)	Pascal Groben	Luxembourg	9:25.21	
2nd place, silver medalist(s)	Josep Sansa	Andorra	9:29.27	
3rd place, bronze medalist(s)	Jamal Baaziz	Monaco	9:33.99	NR
4	Kais Adli	Monaco	9:47.89	
5	Kyriakos Aristotelous	Cyprus	9:56.37	

=== 4 x 100 meters relay ===
June 4

Rank	Lane	Nation	Competitors	Time	Notes
1st place, gold medalist(s)	5	Cyprus	Antreas Michail, Anthos Christofides, Vasilis Polykarpou, Panagiotis Ioannou	41.53	
2nd place, silver medalist(s)	3	Malta	Andy Grech, Rachid Chouhal, Owen Camilleri, Karl Farrugia	41.72	
3rd place, bronze medalist(s)	6	San Marino	Santos Bollini, Ivano Bucci, Federico Gorrieri, Enrico Morganti	42.21	
	4	Iceland	Ivar Kristinn Jasonarson, Einar Dadi Larusson, Kristinn Torfason, Bjorgvin Vikingsson	DNF	

=== 4 x 400 meters relay ===
June 4

Rank	Nation	Competitors	Time	Notes
1st place, gold medalist(s)	Cyprus	Stefanos Anastasiou, Aris Xoufaridis, Riginos Menelaou, Kyriakos Antoniou	3:14.02	
2nd place, silver medalist(s)	Malta	Neil Brimmer, Karl Farrugia, James d'Alfonso, Kevin Arthur Moore	3:15.73	NR
3rd place, bronze medalist(s)	Monaco	Jules Andrieu, Pierre-Marie Arnaud, Rémy Charpentier, Brice Etès	3:20.10	
4	Luxembourg	Kevin Rutare, David Karonei, Yoann Bebon, Sven Fischer	3:24.51	

=== High jump ===
June 4

Rank	Athlete	Nationality	1.80	1.85	1.90	1.95	2.00	2.03	2.06	2.09	2.12	2.15	Result	Notes
1st place, gold medalist(s)	Emilios Xenophontos	Cyprus	–	–	–	–	o	–	o	xxo	o	xxx	2.12	
2nd place, silver medalist(s)	Eugenio Rossi	San Marino	o	–	xo	xo	o	o	xxx				2.03	
3rd place, bronze medalist(s)	Marios Nikolaou	Cyprus	–	–	–	xo	o	xo	xxx				2.03	
4	Kevin Rutare	Luxembourg	o	–	o	o	xo	xxo	xxx				2.03	
5	Einar Dadi Larusson	Iceland	–	o	o	o	o	xxx					2.00	
6	Matteo Mosconi	San Marino	–	o	xo	xxo	xxx						1.95	

=== Pole vault ===
June 1

Rank	Athlete	Nationality	4.20	4.40	4.50	4.60	4.70	4.80	5.00	5.20	Result	Notes
1st place, gold medalist(s)	Nikandros Stylianou	Cyprus	–	–	–	–	–	o	o	xxx	5.00	
2nd place, silver medalist(s)	Andreas Efstathiou	Cyprus	–	o	–	o	o	xxx			4.70	
3rd place, bronze medalist(s)	Einar Dadi Larusson	Iceland	o	o	–	xxo	xxx				4.60	

=== Long jump ===
June 3

Rank	Athlete	Nationality	#1	#2	#3	#4	#5	#6	Result	Notes
1st place, gold medalist(s)	Kristinn Torfason	Iceland	7.59	7.67	6.41	x	x	7.59	7.67	
2nd place, silver medalist(s)	Zacharias Arnos	Cyprus	7.22	7.49	x	x	7.31	7.53	7.53	
3rd place, bronze medalist(s)	Rachid Chouhal	Malta	6.87	5.43	x	6.80	x	6.97	6.97	
4	Andy Grech	Malta	x	6.72	6.76	6.89	6.88	6.83	6.89	
	Moïse Louisy-Louis	Monaco	x	–	–	–	–	–	NM	
	Thorsteinn Ingvarsson	Iceland							DNS	

=== Triple jump ===
June 1

Rank	Athlete	Nationality	#1	#2	#3	#4	#5	#6	Result	Notes
1st place, gold medalist(s)	Zacharias Arnos	Cyprus	15.67	15.92	15.98	x	15.81	x	15.98	
2nd place, silver medalist(s)	Panagiotis Volou	Cyprus	15.63	15.91	15.59	15.51	14.60	x	15.91	

=== Shot put ===
June 4

Rank	Athlete	Nationality	#1	#2	#3	#4	#5	#6	Result	Notes
1st place, gold medalist(s)	Ódinn Björn Thorsteinsson	Iceland	18.47	18.50	18.42	x	19.73	19.13	19.73	GR
2nd place, silver medalist(s)	Georgios Arestis	Cyprus	17.05	17.71	x	x	17.80	x	17.80	
3rd place, bronze medalist(s)	Bob Bertemes	Luxembourg	16.52	x	15.49	16.75	x	x	16.75	
4	Danilo Ristić	Montenegro	x	x	x	16.11	x	x	16.11	
	Orn Davidsson	Iceland							DNS	

=== Discus throw ===
June 3

Rank	Athlete	Nationality	#1	#2	#3	#4	#5	#6	Result	Notes
1st place, gold medalist(s)	Apostolos Parellis	Cyprus	58.59	58.34	55.76	57.43	59.73	58.30	59.73	
2nd place, silver medalist(s)	Danilo Ristić	Montenegro	44.85	x	43.93	x	x	45.98	45.98	
3rd place, bronze medalist(s)	Orn Davidsson	Iceland	43.89	43.40	44.94	45.64	x	45.67	45.67	
4	Einar Dadi Larusson	Iceland	38.45	43.89	38.06	37.14	38.98	32.83	43.89	
5	Moïse Louisy-Louis	Monaco	x	34.80	36.21	38.57	x	x	38.57	

=== Javelin throw ===
June 1

Rank	Athlete	Nationality	#1	#2	#3	#4	#5	#6	Result	Notes
1st place, gold medalist(s)	Antoine Wagner	Luxembourg	x	66.48	69.13	64.63	66.19	65.59	69.13	
2nd place, silver medalist(s)	Orn Davidsson	Iceland	x	65.11	67.16	65.02	x	64.52	67.16	
3rd place, bronze medalist(s)	René Michlig	Liechtenstein	63.39	63.70	x	65.54	x	x	65.54	
4	Moïse Louisy-Louis	Monaco	60.87	x	x	55.07	63.88	59.23	63.88	

== Women's results ==
=== 100 metres ===
Heats – June 1
Wind:
Heat 1: +2.1 m/s, Heat 2: +1.5 m/s

Rank	Heat	Name	Nationality	Time	Notes
1	2	Anna Papaioannou	Cyprus	11.76	Q
2	2	Diane Borg	Malta	11.94	Q
3	2	Tiffany Tshilumba	Luxembourg	12.03	Q
4	1	Martina Pretelli	San Marino	12.04	Q
5	2	Hrafnhild Hermodsdottir	Iceland	12.22	Q
6	1	Hafdis Sigurdardottir	Iceland	12.26	Q
7	1	Theodosia Christou	Cyprus	12.31	
8	1	Charlene Attard	Malta	12.34	
9	1	Chantal Hayen	Luxembourg	12.61	

Final – June 1
Wind:
+1.8 m/s

Rank	Lane	Name	Nationality	Time	Notes
1st place, gold medalist(s)	3	Anna Papaioannou	Cyprus	11.86	
2nd place, silver medalist(s)	4	Diane Borg	Malta	11.89	NR
3rd place, bronze medalist(s)	5	Tiffany Tshilumba	Luxembourg	12.01	
4	2	Martina Pretelli	San Marino	12.02	NR
5	6	Hrafnhild Hermodsdottir	Iceland	12.09	
6	1	Hafdis Sigurdardottir	Iceland	12.15	

=== 200 metres ===
Heats – June 3
Wind:
Heat 1: +1.2 m/s, Heat 2: +0.5 m/s

Rank	Heat	Name	Nationality	Time	Notes
1	2	Anna Papaioannou	Cyprus	24.31	Q
2	2	Diane Borg	Malta	24.34	Q
3	1	Tiffany Tshilumba	Luxembourg	24.65	Q
4	2	Hrafnhild Hermodsdottir	Iceland	24.88	Q
5	1	Martina Pretelli	San Marino	24.94	Q, NR
6	1	Nikoletta Nikolettou	Cyprus	25.19	Q
7	1	Arna Gudmundsdottir	Iceland	26.11	

Final – June 4
Wind:
+1.5 m/s

Rank	Lane	Name	Nationality	Time	Notes
1st place, gold medalist(s)	3	Diane Borg	Malta	24.27	NR
2nd place, silver medalist(s)	4	Anna Papaioannou	Cyprus	24.27	
3rd place, bronze medalist(s)	6	Hrafnhild Hermodsdottir	Iceland	24.58	
4	5	Tiffany Tshilumba	Luxembourg	24.79	
5	2	Martina Pretelli	San Marino	24.94	NR
6	1	Nikoletta Nikolettou	Cyprus	25.33	

=== 400 metres ===
Heats – June 1

Rank	Heat	Name	Nationality	Time	Notes
1	1	Arna Gudmundsdottir	Iceland	56.45	Q
2	1	Frédérique Hansen	Luxembourg	56.90	Q
3	1	Francesca Xuereb	Malta	58.55	Q
4	2	Nicole Gatt	Malta	58.63	Q
5	2	Carole Kill	Luxembourg	59.14	Q
6	1	Paraskevo Thrasyvoulou	Cyprus	59.80	Q
7	2	Stefania Valdimarsdottir	Iceland	1:00.49	
8	2	Rafaela Demetriou	Cyprus	1:01.37	

Final – June 3

Rank	Lane	Name	Nationality	Time	Notes
1st place, gold medalist(s)	3	Arna Gudmundsdottir	Iceland	55.73	
2nd place, silver medalist(s)	4	Frédérique Hansen	Luxembourg	56.38	
3rd place, bronze medalist(s)	5	Nicole Gatt	Malta	57.07	
4	2	Carole Kill	Luxembourg	57.32	
5	6	Francesca Xuereb	Malta	57.55	
6	1	Paraskevo Thrasyvoulou	Cyprus	59.04	

=== 800 metres ===
June 1

Rank	Name	Nationality	Time	Notes
1st place, gold medalist(s)	Meropi Panagiotou	Cyprus	2:10.52	
2nd place, silver medalist(s)	Stella Christoforou	Cyprus	2:12.74	
3rd place, bronze medalist(s)	Martine Mellina	Luxembourg	2:13.41	
4	Aurélie Glowacz	Monaco	2:16.81	
5	Celine Pace	Malta	2:23.40	
6	Laia Isus	Andorra	2:38.22	

=== 1500 metres ===
June 3

Rank	Name	Nationality	Time	Notes
1st place, gold medalist(s)	Meropi Panagiotou	Cyprus	4:36.91	
2nd place, silver medalist(s)	Aurélie Glowacz	Monaco	4:42.26	
3rd place, bronze medalist(s)	Martine Mellina	Luxembourg	4:49.12	
4	Joanne Schwartz	Luxembourg	5:06.45	
5	Laia Isus	Andorra	5:16.90	
	Elpida Christodoulidou	Cyprus	DNS	

=== 5000 metres ===
June 3

Rank	Name	Nationality	Time	Notes
1st place, gold medalist(s)	Sladana Perunović	Montenegro	17:39.70	
2nd place, silver medalist(s)	Lisa Bezzina	Malta	17:48.90	
3rd place, bronze medalist(s)	Pascale Schmötten	Luxembourg	17:54.12	
4	Giselle Camilleri	Malta	18:04.53	
5	Marilena Sofokleous	Cyprus	18:41.52	
6	Nicole Klingler	Liechtenstein	18:42.55	
7	Silvia Felipo	Andorra	18:55.57	
8	Olivia Bißegger	Liechtenstein	20:44.39	

=== 10,000 metres ===
June 1

Rank	Name	Nationality	Time	Notes
1st place, gold medalist(s)	Sladana Perunović	Montenegro	36:00.48	NR
2nd place, silver medalist(s)	Lisa Bezzina	Malta	36:51.86	
3rd place, bronze medalist(s)	Pascale Schmötten	Luxembourg	36:55.16	
4	Giselle Camilleri	Malta	37:22.08	
5	Marilena Sofokleous	Cyprus	37:36.83	
6	Silvia Felipo	Andorra	37:49.28	
	Nicole Klingler	Liechtenstein	DNF	

=== 100 metres hurdles ===
June 4
Wind: +1.0 m/s

Rank	Lane	Name	Nationality	Time	Notes
1st place, gold medalist(s)	3	Dimitra Arachoviti	Cyprus	13.37	
2nd place, silver medalist(s)	6	Arna Gudmundsdottir	Iceland	15.32	
3rd place, bronze medalist(s)	5	Barbara Rustignoli	San Marino	15.34	
	4	Eleni Nikolaou	Cyprus	DQ	

=== 400 metres hurdles ===
June 3

Rank	Lane	Name	Nationality	Time	Notes
1st place, gold medalist(s)	5	Kim Reuland	Luxembourg	1:01.47	
2nd place, silver medalist(s)	4	Stefania Valdimarsdottir	Iceland	1:03.76	
3rd place, bronze medalist(s)	3	Polyxeni Irodotou	Cyprus	1:03.77	

=== 4 x 100 meters relay ===
June 4

Rank	Lane	Nation	Competitors	Time	Notes
1st place, gold medalist(s)	4	Malta	Martina Xuereb, Charlene Attard, Diane Borg, Rebecca Camilleri	46.30	NR
2nd place, silver medalist(s)	6	Cyprus	Dimitra Arachoviti, Theodosia Christou, Nikoletta Nikolettou, Anna Papaioannou	47.08	
3rd place, bronze medalist(s)	3	Iceland	Arna Gudmundsdottir, Hafdis Sigurdardottir, Dorothea Johannesdottir, Hrafnhild Hermodsdottir	47.09	
4	2	Luxembourg	Chantal Hayen, Anaïs Bauer, Tiffany Tshilumba, Frédérique Hansen	48.00	
5	5	San Marino	Eleonora Rossi, Martina Pretelli, Barbara Rustignoli, Alice Capicchioni	49.13	NR

=== 4 x 400 meters relay ===
June 4

Rank	Nation	Competitors	Time	Notes
1st place, gold medalist(s)	Malta	Martina Xuereb, Charlene Attard, Celine Pace, Nicole Gatt	3:49.95	
2nd place, silver medalist(s)	Luxembourg	Frédérique Hansen, Anaïs Bauer, Carole Kill, Kim Reuland	3:51.50	
3rd place, bronze medalist(s)	Cyprus	Rafaela Demetriou, Nikoletta Nikolettou, Polyxeni Irodotou, Paraskevo Thrasyvoulou	4:07.92	

=== High jump ===
June 1

Rank	Athlete	Nationality	1.45	1.50	1.55	1.60	1.65	1.68	1.71	1.74	1.77	1.80	1.83	1.86	1.89	Result	Notes
1st place, gold medalist(s)	Marija Vuković	Montenegro	–	–	–	o	–	o	–	xo	o	o	–	o	xxx	1.86	=GR, SB
2nd place, silver medalist(s)	Leontia Kallenou	Cyprus	–	–	–	o	o	o	o	o	xxo	xxx				1.77	
3rd place, bronze medalist(s)	Sveinbjorg Zophoniasdottir	Iceland	–	–	o	o	o	xo	xxx							1.68	
4	Liz Kuffer	Luxembourg	–	–	–	o	xo	xo	xxx							1.68	
5	Noémie Pleimling	Luxembourg	–	–	o	xxo	xo	xxx								1.65	
	Claudia Guri	Andorra	xxx													NM	

=== Pole vault ===
June 3

Rank	Athlete	Nationality	3.00	3.20	3.30	3.40	3.50	3.60	3.70	3.80	3.85	Result	Notes
1st place, gold medalist(s)	Edna Semedo	Luxembourg	–	–	–	xxo	xo	xxo	xxo	xo	xxx	3.80	
2nd place, silver medalist(s)	Stéphanie Vieillevoye	Luxembourg	–	–	o	–	o	o	o	xxx		3.70	
2nd place, silver medalist(s)	Anna Foitidou	Cyprus	–	–	–	–	o	o	o	xxx		3.70	
4	Eleonora Rossi	San Marino	o	xo	o	xo	xxx					3.40	
	Hulda Thorteinsdottir	Iceland	–	–	–	xxx						NM	

=== Long jump ===
June 3

Rank	Athlete	Nationality	#1	#2	#3	#4	#5	#6	Result	Notes
1st place, gold medalist(s)	Nektaria Panayi	Cyprus	x	6.22	6.35	6.24	5.99	6.05	6.35	
2nd place, silver medalist(s)	Rebecca Camilleri	Malta	5.74	6.21	x	5.77	x	5.91	6.21	
3rd place, bronze medalist(s)	Hafdis Sigurdardottir	Iceland	5.86	5.95	5.89	5.98	5.96	6.09	6.09	
4	Sveinbjorg Zophoniasdottir	Iceland	5.98	5.93	6.07	5.75	5.88	6.06	6.07	
5	Eleftheria Christofi	Cyprus	x	x	5.78	x	x	5.74	5.78	
6	Sonia del Prete	Monaco	5.55	5.70	x	5.46	x	x	5.70	
7	Alessandra Pace	Malta	5.45	x	x	5.40	–	–	5.45	

=== Triple jump ===
June 4

Rank	Athlete	Nationality	#1	#2	#3	#4	#5	#6	Result	Notes
1st place, gold medalist(s)	Nina Serbrzova	Cyprus	x	13.55	x	x	13.63	x	13.63	GR, NR
2nd place, silver medalist(s)	Eleftheria Christofi	Cyprus	x	x	12.75	x	x	13.00	13.00	
3rd place, bronze medalist(s)	Alessandra Pace	Malta	11.76	11.46	11.84	x	x	x	11.84	
4	Dorothea Johannesdottir	Iceland	11.55	x	11.47	x	x	x	11.55	
	Sonia del Prete	Monaco							DNS	

=== Shot put ===
June 4

Rank	Athlete	Nationality	#1	#2	#3	#4	#5	#6	Result	Notes
1st place, gold medalist(s)	Florentia Kappa	Cyprus	13.97	x	14.32	x	14.00	13.99	14.32	
2nd place, silver medalist(s)	Zacharoula Georgiadou	Cyprus	13.27	13.47	x	x	12.87	13.29	13.47	
3rd place, bronze medalist(s)	Sveinbjorg Zophoniasdottir	Iceland	11.93	11.84	11.97	11.31	11.54	12.35	12.35	
4	Veronika Längle-Meier	Liechtenstein	11.12	11.73	12.31	11.82	12.24	x	12.31	
5	Emmanuelle Schübler	Monaco	10.16	11.00	11.31	10.87	10.18	10.45	11.31	

=== Discus throw ===
June 3

Rank	Athlete	Nationality	#1	#2	#3	#4	#5	#6	Result	Notes
1st place, gold medalist(s)	Zacharoula Georgiadou	Cyprus	46.55	49.22	49.09	x	x	49.98	49.98	GR
2nd place, silver medalist(s)	Androniki Lada	Cyprus	x	48.18	x	47.60	47.41	x	48.18	
3rd place, bronze medalist(s)	Veronika Längle-Meier	Liechtenstein	36.93	x	39.17	41.37	40.43	x	41.37	NR
4	Emmanuelle Schübler	Monaco	x	39.12	37.07	39.08	39.78	39.93	39.93	
5	Noémie Pleimling	Luxembourg	x	36.82	36.09	37.00	x	x	37.00	

== Medal table ==
Rank	Nation	Gold	Silver	Bronze	Total
1	Cyprus	19	15	8	42
2	Luxembourg	5	4	8	17
3	Malta	4	6	4	14
4	Iceland	3	4	8	15
5	Montenegro	3	1	0	4
6	Andorra	1	3	1	5
7	Monaco	1	2	2	5
8	San Marino	0	1	2	3
9	Liechtenstein	0	0	2	2
Totals (9 entries)		36	36	35	107

== Participating teams ==
- Andorra (8)
- Cyprus (42)
- Iceland (13)
- Liechtenstein (6) (Host team)
- Luxembourg (23)
- Malta (17)
- Monaco (13)
- Montenegro (3)
- San Marino (10)
