= Athletics at the 2013 Games of the Small States of Europe =

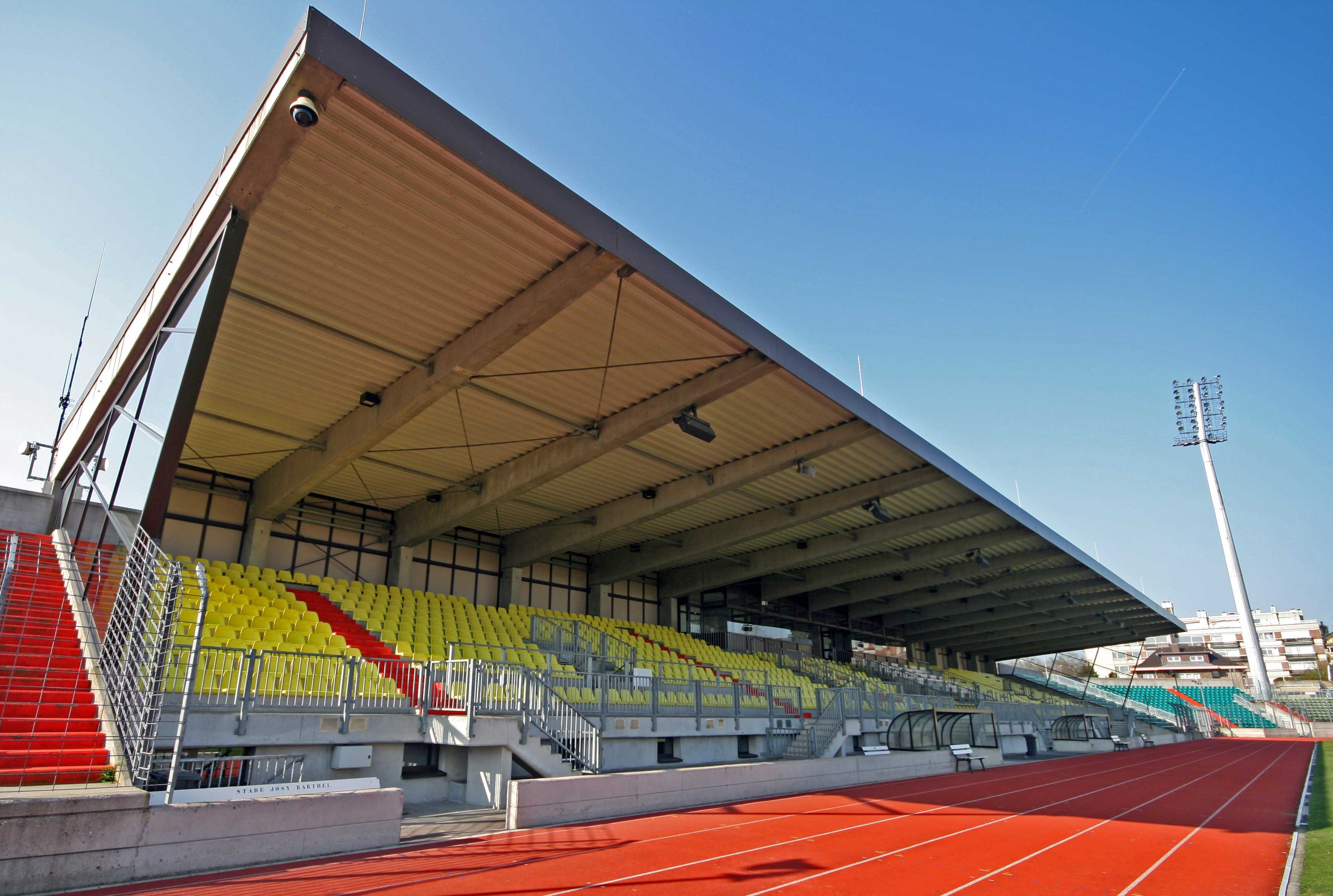
- Host stadium in Luxembourg
- Dates: 28 May – 1 June
- Host city: Luxembourg, Luxembourg
- Venue: Stade Josy Barthel
- Events: 36
- Participation: 149 athletes from 9 nations

Athletics at the 2013 Games of the Small States of Europe was held from 28 May to 1 June at the Stade Josy Barthel.

The men's 100 metres champion, Christos Chatziangelidis of Cyprus, gave a positive doping test during the competition, meaning the disqualification of his 100 m title, a 200 m silver medal, and also the 4×100 m relay title on by Cyprus.

== Medal summary ==
=== Men ===
Event	Gold		Silver		Bronze	
100 metres	Christos Chatziangelidis (CYP)	10.77	Michail Charalampous (CYP)	10.83	Kolbeinn Hödur Gunnarsson (ISL)	10.84
200 metres	Ivar Kristinn Jasonarson (ISL)	21.88	Christos Chatziangelidis (CYP)	21.89	Kriton Kyriakidis (CYP)	22.11
400 metres	Kevin Arthur Moore (MLT)	47.53	Ivar Kristinn Jasonarson (ISL)	48.05	Kolbeinn Hödur Gunnarsson (ISL)	48.21
800 metres	Amine Khadiri (CYP)	1:53.15	Brice Etès (MON)	1:54.05	Christophe Bestgen (LUX)	1:55.42
1500 metres	Amine Khadiri (CYP)	3:54.20	David Karonei (LUX)	3:54.80	Kais Adli (MON)	3:57.94
5000 metres	Pol Mellina (LUX)	14:29.82	Kári Steinn Karlsson (ISL)	14:33.41	Marcos Sanza (AND)	14:38.38
10,000 metres	Marcos Sanza (AND)	30:17.47	Pol Mellina (LUX)	30:26.46	Kári Steinn Karlsson (ISL)	30:41.14
110 metres hurdles	Milan Trajkovic (CYP)	14.03	Claude Godart (LUX)	14.20	Moïse Louisy-Louis (MON)	16.43
400 metres hurdles	Jacques Frisch (LUX)	52.28	Aris Xoufaridis (CYP)	54.28	Jamal Baaziz (MON)	58.08
3000 metres steeplechase	Zouhair Ouredi (MON)	9:18.71	Pascal Groben (LUX)	9:21.74	Josep Sansa (AND)	9:27.59
4×100 metres relay	Cyprus; Michail Charalampous; Christos Chatziangelidis; Vasilis Polykarpou; Filippos Spastris	41.71	Iceland; Kristinn Torfason; Kolbeinn Hödur Gunnarsson; Ivar Kristinn Jasonarson; Thorsteinn Ingvarsson	41.91	Malta; Luke Bezzina; Steve Camilleri; Rachid Chouhal; Andy Grech	41.98
4×400 metres relay	Cyprus; Kyriakos Antoniou; Georgios Avraam; Kriton Kyriakidis; Riginos Menelaou	3:13.55	Luxembourg; Jacques Frisch; Vincent Karger; Bob Lallemang; Tom Scholer	3:14.45	Malta; Neil Brimmer; Steve Camilleri; Matthew Croker; Kevin Arthur Moore	3:18.39
High jump	Vasilios Konstantinou (CYP)	2.12 m	Eugenio Rossi (SMR)	2.06 m	Kevin Rutare (LUX)	2.06 m
Pole vault	Nikandros Stylianou (CYP)	5.15 m	Sebastien Hoffelt (LUX)	5.00 m	Mark Johnson (ISL)	4.90 m
Long jump	Christodoulos Theofilou (CYP)	7.28 m	Kristinn Torfason (ISL)	7.27 m	Thorsteinn Ingvarsson (ISL)	7.14 m
Triple jump	Panagiotis Volou (CYP)	15.93 m	Zacharias Arnos (CYP)	15.53 m	Andy Grech (MLT)	15.05 m
Shot put	Danijel Furtula (MNE)	18.43 m	Óðinn Björn Þorsteinsson (ISL)	18.22 m	Bob Bertemes (LUX)	17.65 m
Discus throw	Danijel Furtula (MNE)	62.83 m GR	Apostolos Parellis (CYP)	59.11 m	Sven Forster (LUX)	50.30 m
Javelin throw	Gudmundur Sverrisson (ISL)	74.38 m	Örn Davidsson (ISL)	69.34 m	Antoine Wagner (LUX)	67.83 m

=== Women ===
Event	Gold		Silver		Bronze	
100 metres	Anna Ramona Papaioannou (CYP)	11.57	Tiffany Tshilumba (LUX)	11.99	Hafdis Sigurdardottir (ISL)	12.00
200 metres	Anna Ramona Papaioannou (CYP)	23.40	Hafdis Sigurdardottir (ISL)	23.82	Dimitra Kyriakidou (CYP)	24.37
400 metres	Aníta Hinriksdóttir (ISL)	54.29	Charline Mathias (LUX)	54.93	Kalliopi Kountouri (CYP)	56.46
800 metres	Aníta Hinriksdóttir (ISL)	2:04.60	Charline Mathias (LUX)	2:05.80	Martine Nobili (LUX)	2:06.57
1500 metres	Martine Nobili (LUX)	4:27.08	Natalia Evangelidou (CYP)	4:27.27	Jenny Gloden (LUX)	4:58.54
5000 metres	Slađana Perunović (MNE)	16:53.20	Elpida Christodoulidou (CYP)	17:36.07	Giselle Camilleri (MLT)	17:39.44
10,000 metres	Slađana Perunović (MNE)	35:21.21	Pascale Schmoetten (LUX)	37:04.37	Giselle Camilleri (MLT)	37:24.22
100 metres hurdles	Natalia Christofi (CYP)	14.32	Fjola Signy Hannesdóttir (ISL)	14.41	Barbara Rustignoli (SMR)	14.84
400 metres hurdles	Kim Reuland (LUX)	59.80	Stefanía Valdimarsdóttir (ISL)	1:00.86	Fjola Signy Hannesdóttir (ISL)	1:02.26
4×100 metres relay	Cyprus; Paraskevi Andreou; Dimitra Kyriakidou; Nikoletta Nikolettou; Anna Ramona Papaioannou	46.02	Iceland; Hrafnhild Eir Hermodsdottir; Maria Run Gunnlaugsdóttir; Hafdis Sigurdardottir; Sveinbjorg Zophoniasdottir	46.43	Luxembourg; Analis Bauer; Laurence Jones; Shanilla Mutumba; Tiffany Tshilumba	46.98
4×400 metres relay	Iceland; Fjola Signy Hannesdóttir; Aníta Hinriksdóttir; Hafdis Sigurdardottir; Stefanía Valdimarsdóttir	3:40.97	Luxembourg; Frédérique Hansen; Laurence Jones; Charline Mathias; Kim Reuland	3:44.38	Malta; Francesca Borg; Nicole Gatt; Janet Richard; Lara Scerri	3:54.97
High jump	Marija Vuković (MNE)	1.77 m	Elodie Tshilumba (LUX)	1.74 m	Stefani Razi (CYP)	1.71 m
Pole vault	Gina Reuland (LUX)	4.00 m	Edna Mari Semedo Monteiro (LUX); Maria Aristotelous (CYP)	3.60 m	not awarded	
Long jump	Nektaria Panayi (CYP)	6.07 m	Hafdis Sigurdardottir (ISL)	6.06 m	Eleftheria Christofi (CYP)	5.96 m
Triple jump	Eleftheria Christofi (CYP)	13.20 m	Rebecca Sare (MLT)	12.08 m	Malory Malgherini (MON)	11.40 m
Shot put	Florentia Kappa (CYP)	15.36 m	Stéphanie Krumlovsky (LUX)	12.97 m	Sveinbjorg Zophoniasdottir (ISL)	12.49 m
Javelin throw	Ásdís Hjálmsdóttir (ISL)	56.15 m	Inga Stasiulionytė (MON)	46.83 m	Maria Run Gunnlaugsdóttir (ISL)	46.44 m

== Medal table ==
* Host nation (Luxembourg)

Rank	Nation	Gold	Silver	Bronze	Total
1	Cyprus	17	8	5	30
2	Iceland	6	10	9	25
3	Luxembourg*	5	14	8	27
4	Montenegro	5	0	0	5
5	Malta	1	2	6	9
6	Monaco	1	2	4	7
7	Andorra	1	0	2	3
8	San Marino	0	1	1	2
Totals (8 entries)		36	37	35	108

== Participating countries ==
- Andorra (7)
- Cyprus (39)
- Iceland (18)
- Liechtenstein (3)
- Luxembourg (36) (host team)
- Malta (15)
- Monaco (15)
- Montenegro (3)
- San Marino (13)

== Men's results ==
=== 100 metres ===
Heats – May 28
Wind:
Heat 1: -2.7 m/s, Heat 2: -0.2 m/s

Rank	Heat	Name	Team	Time	Notes
1	2	Michail Charalampous	Cyprus	10.93	Q
2	1	Christos Chatziangelidis	Cyprus	10.99	Q, SB
3	2	Luke Bezzina	Malta	11.11	q, PB
4	1	Kolbeinn Höður Gunnarsson	Iceland	11.14	q, SB
4	1	Steve Camilleri	Malta	11.14	q
6	2	Trausti Stefansson	Iceland	11.16	SB, q
7	2	Mikel de Sa	Andorra	11.36	SB
8	1	Federico Gorrieri	San Marino	11.65	
9	1	John Kieber	Liechtenstein	11.68	SB
10	2	Anas Adoui	Monaco	12.03	

Final – May 28
Wind:
0.0 m/s

Rank	Name	Team	Time	Notes
1st place, gold medalist(s)	Christos Chantziangelidis	Cyprus	10.77	SB
2nd place, silver medalist(s)	Michail Charalampous	Cyprus	10.83	
3rd place, bronze medalist(s)	Kolbeinn Höður Gunnarsson	Iceland	10.84	PB
4	Steve Camilleri	Malta	10.90	
5	Luke Bezzina	Malta	10.98	PB
6	Trausti Stefansson	Iceland	11.03	SB

=== 200 metres ===
Heats – May 30
Wind:
Heat 1: +1.8 m/s, Heat 2: +1.5 m/s

Rank	Heat	Name	Team	Time	Notes
1	1	Christos Chatziangelidis	Cyprus	21.79	Q
2	1	Ívar Kristinn Jasonarson	Iceland	21.97	q
3	2	Trausti Stefansson	Iceland	22.03	Q
4	2	Kriton Kyriakidis	Cyprus	22.19	q
5	1	Steve Camilleri	Malta	22.20	q
6	1	Hua Wilfrieds Serge Koffi	Monaco	22.62	q
7	1	Mikel de Sa	Andorra	22.73	
8	1	Francesco Molinari	San Marino	22.81	
9	2	Ivano Bucci	San Marino	22.86	
10	2	Fabian Haldner	Liechtenstein	23.14	
	2	Luke Bezzina	Malta	DQ	FS

Final – June 1
Wind:
+2.9 m/s

Rank	Name	Team	Time	Notes
1st place, gold medalist(s)	Ívar Kristinn Jasonarson	Iceland	21.88	
2nd place, silver medalist(s)	Christos Chatziangelidis	Cyprus	21.89	
3rd place, bronze medalist(s)	Kriton Kyriakidis	Cyprus	22.11	
4	Steve Camilleri	Malta	22.47	
	Trausti Stefansson	Iceland	DNF	
	Hua Wilfrieds Serge Koffi	Monaco	DQ	FS

=== 400 metres ===
Heats – May 28

Rank	Heat	Name	Team	Time	Notes
1	1	Kevin Arthur Moore	Malta	48.44	Q
2	2	Kolbeinn Höður Gunnarsson	Iceland	48.50	Q
3	1	Ívar Kristinn Jasonarson	Iceland	48.54	q
4	1	Tom Scholer	Luxembourg	49.09	q
5	1	Kyriakos Antoniou	Cyprus	49.12	q
6	2	Bob Lallemang	Luxembourg	49.22	q
7	2	Georgios Avraam	Cyprus	49.22	
8	2	Brice Etès	Monaco	49.50	
9	1	Rémy Charpentier	Monaco	50.25	
10	2	Matthew Croker	Malta	50.66	
11	2	Fabian Haldner	Liechtenstein	50.86	

Final – May 30

Rank	Name	Team	Time	Notes
1st place, gold medalist(s)	Kevin Arthur Moore	Malta	47.53	NR
2nd place, silver medalist(s)	Ívar Kristinn Jasonarson	Iceland	48.05	
3rd place, bronze medalist(s)	Kolbeinn Höður Gunnarsson	Iceland	48.21	
4	Tom Scholer	Luxembourg	48.99	
5	Kyriakos Antoniou	Cyprus	49.13	
6	Bob Lallemang	Luxembourg	49.26	

=== 800 metres ===
May 28

Rank	Name	Team	Time	Notes
1st place, gold medalist(s)	Amine Khadiri	Cyprus	1:53.15	
2nd place, silver medalist(s)	Brice Etès	Monaco	1:54.05	
3rd place, bronze medalist(s)	Christophe Bestgen	Luxembourg	1:55.42	
4	Snorri Sigurðsson	Iceland	1:55.79	
5	Theofanis Michaelas	Cyprus	1:57.00	

=== 1500 metres ===
May 30

Rank	Name	Team	Time	Notes
1st place, gold medalist(s)	Amine Khadiri	Cyprus	3:54.20	
2nd place, silver medalist(s)	David Karonei	Luxembourg	3:54.80	
3rd place, bronze medalist(s)	Kaïs Adli	Monaco	3:57.94	
4	Theofanis Michaelas	Cyprus	3:58.17	
5	Snorri Sigurðsson	Iceland	4:03.45	
6	Samuel Malik Diaz	Monaco	4:09.88	

=== 5000 metres ===
May 28

Rank	Name	Team	Time	Notes
1st place, gold medalist(s)	Pol Mellina	Luxembourg	14:29.82	
2nd place, silver medalist(s)	Kári Steinn Karlsson	Iceland	14:33.41	
3rd place, bronze medalist(s)	Marcos Sanza	Andorra	14:38.38	
4	Antoni Bernadó	Andorra	14:53.68	
5	Omar Bachir	Monaco	15:25.78	
6	Kassahun Ahmed	Cyprus	15:26.50	
7	Nicolas Toscan	Monaco	15:41.48	

=== 10,000 metres ===
June 1

Rank	Name	Team	Time	Notes
1st place, gold medalist(s)	Marcos Sanza	Andorra	30:17.47	
2nd place, silver medalist(s)	Pol Mellina	Luxembourg	30:26.46	
3rd place, bronze medalist(s)	Kári Steinn Karlsson	Iceland	30:41.14	
4	Antoni Bernadó	Andorra	31:15.40	
5	Vincent Nothum	Luxembourg	31:21.98	
6	Kassahun Ahmed	Cyprus	32:01.80	
7	Omar Bachir	Monaco	33:48.55	
	Zouhair Ouerdi	Monaco	DNF	

=== 110 metres hurdles ===
May 30
Wind: 0.0 m/s

Rank	Name	Team	Time	Notes
1st place, gold medalist(s)	Milan Trajkovic	Cyprus	14.03	
2nd place, silver medalist(s)	Claude Godart	Luxembourg	14.20	
3rd place, bronze medalist(s)	Moïse Louisy-Louis	Monaco	16.43	
	Rémy Charpentier	Monaco	DNF	

=== 400 metres hurdles ===
May 30

Rank	Name	Team	Time	Notes
1st place, gold medalist(s)	Jacques Frisch	Luxembourg	52.28	
2nd place, silver medalist(s)	Aris Xoufaridis	Cyprus	54.28	
3rd place, bronze medalist(s)	Jamal Baaziz	Monaco	58.08	NR
4	Rémy Charpentier	Monaco	58.42	

=== 3000 metres steeplechase ===
May 30

Rank	Name	Team	Time	Notes
1st place, gold medalist(s)	Zouhair Ouerdi	Monaco	9:18.71	
2nd place, silver medalist(s)	Pascal Groben	Luxembourg	9:21.74	
3rd place, bronze medalist(s)	Josep Sansa	Andorra	9:27.59	
4	David Karonei	Luxembourg	9:56.66	
5	Carles Gómez	Andorra	10:17.48	
	Jamal Baaziz	Monaco	DNF	

=== 4 x 100 meters relay ===
June 1

Rank	Nation	Competitors	Time	Notes
1st place, gold medalist(s)	Cyprus	Filippos Spastris, Michail Charalampous, Vasilis Polykarpou, Christos Chatziangelidis	41.71	
2nd place, silver medalist(s)	Iceland	Kristinn Torfason, Kolbeinn Hödur Gunnarsson, Ívar Kristinn Jasonarson, Thorsteinn Ingvarsson	41.98	
3rd place, bronze medalist(s)	Malta	Luke Bezzina, Rachid Chouhal, Steve Camilleri, Andy Grech	41.91	
4	San Marino	Fabrizio Righi, Federico Gorrieri, Ivano Bucci, Francesco Molinari	42.72	
	Luxembourg	Lionel Evora, Marc Debanck, Tom Hutmacher, Marek Hoffmann	DQ	

=== 4 x 400 meters relay ===
June 1

Rank	Nation	Competitors	Time	Notes
1st place, gold medalist(s)	Cyprus	Kriton Kyriakidis, Riginos Menelaou, Georgios Avraam, Kyriakos Antoniou	3:13.55	
2nd place, silver medalist(s)	Luxembourg	Bob Lallemang, Vincent Karger, Tom Scholer, Jacques Frisch	3:14.45	NR
3rd place, bronze medalist(s)	Malta	Steve Camilleri, Neil Brimmer, Matthew Croker, Kevin Arthur Moore	3:18.39	
4	Monaco	Hua Wilfrieds Serge Koffi, Dylan Bouilly, Rémy Charpentier, Brice Etès	3:21.15	

=== High jump ===
June 1

Rank	Name	Team	1.80	1.90	1.95	2.00	2.03	2.06	2.09	2.12	2.17	2.21	Result	Notes
1st place, gold medalist(s)	Vasilios Konstantinou	Cyprus	–	–	–	o	–	o	–	o	xx–	x	2.12	
2nd place, silver medalist(s)	Eugenio Rossi	San Marino	–	o	–	o	o	o	xxx				2.06	
3rd place, bronze medalist(s)	Kevin Rutare	Luxembourg	–	o	–	o	o	xxo	xxx				2.06	
4	Matteo Mosconi	San Marino	o	o	o	xxx							1.95	

=== Pole vault ===
May 28

Rank	Name	Team	4.00	4.20	4.60	4.80	4.90	5.00	5.10	5.15	5.20	Result	Notes
1st place, gold medalist(s)	Nikandros Stylianou	Cyprus	–	–	–	o	–	o	–	o	xxx	5.15	
2nd place, silver medalist(s)	Sébastien Hoffelt	Luxembourg	–	–	–	xo	–	xo	xxx			5.00	
3rd place, bronze medalist(s)	Mark Johnson	Iceland	–	–	–	–	xo	xxx				4.90	
4	Joe Seil	Luxembourg	–	–	xo	o	xxx					4.80	
5	Miquel Vilchez	Andorra	o	xxx								4.00	

=== Long jump ===
May 30

Rank	Name	Team	#1	#2	#3	#4	#5	#6	Result	Notes
1st place, gold medalist(s)	Christodoulos Theofilou	Cyprus	7.28	x	x	x	7.09	7.08	7.28	
2nd place, silver medalist(s)	Kristinn Torfason	Iceland	7.06	7.17	7.14	7.22	7.27	7.17	7.27	
3rd place, bronze medalist(s)	Thorsteinn Ingvarsson	Iceland	6.94	7.00	6.98	x	7.12	7.14	7.14	
4	Rachid Chouhal	Malta	6.49	x	x	x	x	6.88	6.88	
5	Zacharias Arnos	Cyprus	6.42	x	6.85	6.72	6.66	6.45	6.85	
6	Andy Grech	Malta	6.78	6.68	6.70	x	6.79	x	6.79	
7	Filippo Gorrieri	San Marino	6.76	6.19	6.69	x	6.41	x	6.76	
8	John Kieber	Liechtenstein	6.25	x	5.80	x	x	6.12	6.25	

=== Triple jump ===
June 1

Rank	Name	Team	#1	#2	#3	#4	#5	#6	Result	Notes
1st place, gold medalist(s)	Panagiotis Volou	Cyprus	15.41	15.50	15.43	15.93	x	15.61	15.93	
2nd place, silver medalist(s)	Zacharias Arnos	Cyprus	15.00	x	x	15.30	x	15.53w	15.53w	
3rd place, bronze medalist(s)	Andy Grech	Malta	14.49	14.83	14.53	15.05	14.81	x	15.05	
4	Filippo Gorrieri	San Marino	x	x	x	x	x	13.46	13.46	

=== Shot put ===
May 28

Rank	Name	Team	#1	#2	#3	#4	#5	#6	Result	Notes
1st place, gold medalist(s)	Danijel Furtula	Montenegro	17.81	18.43	17.22	17.45	17.29	17.41	18.43	NR
2nd place, silver medalist(s)	Óðinn Björn Þorsteinsson	Iceland	17.11	16.63	17.30	18.22	17.83	18.15	18.22	
3rd place, bronze medalist(s)	Bob Bertemes	Luxembourg	17.35	17.46	16.31	17.20	17.28	17.65	17.65	NR
4	Georgios Arestis	Cyprus	x	x	16.88	x	17.04	x	17.04	

=== Discus throw ===
May 30

Rank	Name	Team	#1	#2	#3	#4	#5	#6	Result	Notes
1st place, gold medalist(s)	Danijel Furtula	Montenegro	x	x	x	x	62.83	x	62.83	GR
2nd place, silver medalist(s)	Apostolos Parellis	Cyprus	58.84	59.06	57.05	58.18	x	59.11	59.11	
3rd place, bronze medalist(s)	Sven Forster	Luxembourg	50.30	43.98	x	46.88	x	49.58	50.30	
4	Óðinn Björn Þorsteinsson	Iceland	x	47.09	48.80	50.14	48.04	47.53	50.14	
5	Moïse Louisy-Louis	Monaco	36.30	x	35.79	–	–	–	36.30	
	Orestis Antoniades	Cyprus	x	x	x	x	x	x	NM	

=== Javelin throw ===
June 1

Rank	Name	Team	#1	#2	#3	#4	#5	#6	Result	Notes
1st place, gold medalist(s)	Guðmundur Sverrisson	Iceland	72.79	72.80	71.51	72.25	74.38	72.29	74.38	
2nd place, silver medalist(s)	Örn Davidsson	Iceland	69.34	x	x	66.72	67.38	x	69.34	
3rd place, bronze medalist(s)	Antoine Wagner	Luxembourg	61.57	x	67.20	x	67.83	67.61	67.83	
4	Moïse Louisy-Louis	Monaco	60.07	59.36	60.86	58.93	x	x	60.86	
5	Michalis Kakotas	Cyprus	55.89	57.43	55.84	52.76	56.36	50.06	57.43	
6	Simone Para	San Marino	57.01	57.21	51.83	54.05	52.60	56.93	57.21	

== Women's results ==
=== 100 metres ===
Heats – May 28
Wind:
Heat 1: -0.3 m/s, Heat 2: +0.5 m/s

Rank	Heat	Name	Team	Time	Notes
1	1	Anna Ramona Papaioannou	Cyprus	11.65	Q, PB
2	2	Hafdís Sigurðardóttir	Iceland	11.88	Q, PB
3	2	Paraskevi Andreou	Cyprus	11.92	q, PB
4	2	Tiffany Tshilumba	Luxembourg	11.97	q, PB
5	2	Diane Borg	Malta	12.12	q, SB
6	1	Hrafnhild Eir Hermóðsdóttir	Iceland	12.25	q, SB
7	1	Rebecca Camilleri	Malta	12.26	
8	1	Martina Pretelli	San Marino	12.34	
9	1	Anaïs Bauer	Luxembourg	12.45	SB
10	2	Ester Sebastián	Andorra	12.52	NR
11	2	Chiara Benedettini	San Marino	13.40	PB

Final – May 28
Wind:
0.0 m/s

Rank	Name	Team	Time	Notes
1st place, gold medalist(s)	Anna Ramona Papaioannou	Cyprus	11.57	PB
2nd place, silver medalist(s)	Tiffany Tshilumba	Luxembourg	11.99	
3rd place, bronze medalist(s)	Hafdís Sigurðardóttir	Iceland	12.00	
4	Hrafnhild Eir Hermóðsdóttir	Iceland	12.24	SB
5	Diane Borg	Malta	12.25	
	Paraskevi Andreou	Cyprus	DQ	

=== 200 metres ===
Heats – May 30
Wind:
Heat 1: +1.0 m/s, Heat 2: +0.5 m/s

Rank	Heat	Name	Team	Time	Notes
1	1	Anna Ramona Papaioannou	Cyprus	23.85	Q
2	2	Hafdís Sigurðardóttir	Iceland	24.27	Q
3	2	Dimitra Kyriakidou	Cyprus	24.79	q
4	1	Hrafnhild Eir Hermóðsdóttir	Iceland	24.93	q
5	1	Diane Borg	Malta	25.17	q
6	1	Martina Pretelli	San Marino	25.59	q
7	2	Ester Sebastián	Andorra	26.03	
8	2	Nicole Gatt	Malta	26.27	
	1	Laurence Jones	Luxembourg	DNF	
	2	Anaïs Bauer	Luxembourg	DNF	

Final – June 1
Wind:
0.0 m/s

Rank	Name	Team	Time	Notes
1st place, gold medalist(s)	Anna Ramona Papaioannou	Cyprus	23.40	
2nd place, silver medalist(s)	Hafdís Sigurðardóttir	Iceland	23.82	
3rd place, bronze medalist(s)	Dimitra Kyriakidou	Cyprus	24.37	
4	Diane Borg	Malta	24.86	
5	Hrafnhild Eir Hermóðsdóttir	Iceland	24.94	
6	Martina Pretelli	San Marino	25.30	

=== 400 metres ===
Heats – May 28

Rank	Lane	Name	Team	Time	Notes
1	1	Aníta Hinriksdóttir	Iceland	55.5	Q, SB
2	2	Charline Mathias	Luxembourg	56.5	Q
3	2	Kalliopi Kountouri	Cyprus	57.5	q, PB
4	1	Laurence Jones	Luxembourg	58.3	q
4	2	Lise Boryna	Monaco	58.3	q, PB
6	2	Lara Scerri	Malta	59.8	q
7	1	Janet Richard	Malta	59.9	
8	1	Rafaela Demetriou	Cyprus	1:02.0	PB

Final – May 30

Rank	Name	Team	Time	Notes
1st place, gold medalist(s)	Aníta Hinriksdóttir	Iceland	54.29	NYR, NJR
2nd place, silver medalist(s)	Charline Mathias	Luxembourg	54.93	NR
3rd place, bronze medalist(s)	Kalliopi Kountouri	Cyprus	56.46	PB
4	Laurence Jones	Luxembourg	57.13	PB
5	Lise Boryna	Monaco	57.97	PB
6	Lara Scerri	Malta	59.22	

=== 800 metres ===
May 28

Rank	Name	Team	Time	Notes
1st place, gold medalist(s)	Aníta Hinriksdóttir	Iceland	2:04.60	SB
2nd place, silver medalist(s)	Charline Mathias	Luxembourg	2:05.80	PB
3rd place, bronze medalist(s)	Martine Nobili	Luxembourg	2:06.57	PB
4	Natalia Evangelidou	Cyprus	2:06.62	PB

=== 1500 metres ===
May 30

Rank	Name	Team	Time	Notes
1st place, gold medalist(s)	Martine Nobili	Luxembourg	4:27.08	
2nd place, silver medalist(s)	Natalia Evangelidou	Cyprus	4:27.27	
3rd place, bronze medalist(s)	Jenny Gloden	Luxembourg	4:58.54	

=== 5000 metres ===
June 1

Rank	Name	Team	Time	Notes
1st place, gold medalist(s)	Slađana Perunović	Montenegro	16:53.20	
2nd place, silver medalist(s)	Elpida Christodoulidou	Cyprus	17:36.07	
3rd place, bronze medalist(s)	Giselle Camilleri	Malta	17:39.44	
4	Pascale Schmoetten	Luxembourg	17:44.64	
5	Rannveig Oddsdóttir	Iceland	18:07.24	
	Martine Mellina	Luxembourg	DNF	

=== 10,000 metres ===
May 28

Rank	Name	Team	Time	Notes
1st place, gold medalist(s)	Slađana Perunović	Montenegro	35:21.21	NR
2nd place, silver medalist(s)	Pascale Schmoetten	Luxembourg	37:04.37	
3rd place, bronze medalist(s)	Giselle Camilleri	Malta	37:24.22	
4	Rannveig Oddsdóttir	Iceland	37:40.40	

=== 100 metres hurdles ===
May 30
Wind: 0.0 m/s

Rank	Name	Team	Time	Notes
1st place, gold medalist(s)	Natalia Christofi	Cyprus	14.32	
2nd place, silver medalist(s)	Fjóla Signý Hannesdóttir	Iceland	14.41	
3rd place, bronze medalist(s)	Barbara Rustignoli	San Marino	14.84	
4	Malory Malgherini	Monaco	14.86	
5	Chara Papapetrou	Cyprus	14.88	
	María Rún Gunnlaugsdóttir	Iceland	DNF	

=== 400 metres hurdles ===
May 30

Rank	Name	Team	Time	Notes
1st place, gold medalist(s)	Kim Reuland	Luxembourg	59.80	
2nd place, silver medalist(s)	Stefanía Valdimarsdóttir	Iceland	1:00.86	
3rd place, bronze medalist(s)	Fjóla Signý Hannesdóttir	Iceland	1:02.26	
4	Elena Stefanou	Cyprus	1:03.95	
5	Lise Boryna	Monaco	1:04.63	NR

=== 4 x 100 meters relay ===
June 1

Rank	Nation	Competitors	Time	Notes
1st place, gold medalist(s)	Cyprus	Paraskevi Andreou, Dimitra Kyriakidou, Nikoletta Nikolettou, Anna Ramona Papaioannou	46.02	
2nd place, silver medalist(s)	Iceland	Sveinbjörg Zophoníasdóttir, Hafdís Sigurðardóttir, María Rún Gunnlaugsdóttir, Hrafnhild Eir Hermóðsdóttir	46.43	
3rd place, bronze medalist(s)	Luxembourg	Shanila Mutumba, Anaïs Bauer, Laurence Jones, Tiffany Tshilumba	46.98	
4	San Marino	Chiara Benedettini, Martina Pretelli, Barbara Rustignoli, Melissa Michelotti	49.47	
	Malta	Rebecca Camilleri, Robyn Zammit, Nicole Gatt, Diane Borg	DQ	

=== 4 x 400 meters relay ===
June 1

Rank	Nation	Competitors	Time	Notes
1st place, gold medalist(s)	Iceland	Stefanía Valdimarsdóttir, Fjóla Signý Hannesdóttir, Hafdís Sigurðardóttir, Aníta Hinriksdóttir	3:40.97	
2nd place, silver medalist(s)	Luxembourg	Laurence Jones, Frédérique Hansen, Kim Reuland, Charline Mathias	3:44.38	NR
3rd place, bronze medalist(s)	Malta	Nicole Gatt, Lara Scerri, Francesca Borg, Janet Richard	3:54.97	
	Cyprus	Elena Stefanou, Rafaela Demetriou, Natalia Evangelidou, Kalliopi Kountouri	DQ	R 170.18

=== High jump ===
May 30

Rank	Name	Team	1.45	1.50	1.55	1.60	1.65	1.68	1.71	1.74	1.77	1.81	Result	Notes
1st place, gold medalist(s)	Marija Vuković	Montenegro	–	–	–	–	–	o	xo	xxo	xo	xxx	1.77	
2nd place, silver medalist(s)	Elodie Tshilumba	Luxembourg	–	–	–	x	xo	o	o	xo	xxx		1.74	
3rd place, bronze medalist(s)	Stefani Razi	Cyprus	–	–	–	–	o	–	o	xxx			1.71	
4	Sveinbjörg Zophoníasdóttir	Iceland	–	o	xo	o	o	xo	xxx				1.68	
5	María Rún Gunnlaugsdóttir	Iceland	–	–	o	o	xxo	xxx					1.65	
6	Kathrin Berginz	Liechtenstein	xo	o	o	xxx							1.55	

=== Pole vault ===
May 30

Rank	Name	Team	3.00	3.20	3.30	3.40	3.50	3.60	3.70	3.80	4.00	4.11	Result	Notes
1st place, gold medalist(s)	Gina Reuland	Luxembourg	–	–	–	–	–	–	–	o	xo	xxx	4.00	
2nd place, silver medalist(s)	Edna Semedo	Luxembourg	–	–	–	–	–	o	–	xxx			3.60	
2nd place, silver medalist(s)	Maria Aristotelous	Cyprus	–	–	o	–	o	o	xxx				3.60	
4	Eleonora Rossi	San Marino	o	o	–	xo	xxx						3.40	=NR

=== Long jump ===
May 28

Rank	Name	Team	#1	#2	#3	#4	#5	#6	Result	Notes
1st place, gold medalist(s)	Nektaria Panayi	Cyprus	6.07	6.06	6.01	5.91	5.81	–	6.07	
2nd place, silver medalist(s)	Hafdís Sigurðardóttir	Iceland	5.91	6.02	5.54	5.95	6.06	6.04	6.06	
3rd place, bronze medalist(s)	Eleftheria Christofi	Cyprus	5.54	5.81	5.96	5.80	5.61	x	5.96	
4	Rebecca Camilleri	Malta	x	5.82	x	5.70	x	x	5.82	
5	Sveinbjörg Zophoníasdóttir	Iceland	5.80	5.72	5.60	5.66	x	5.67	5.80	
6	Rebecca Sare	Malta	x	x	5.21	5.18	5.06	x	5.21	

=== Triple jump ===
June 1

Rank	Name	Team	#1	#2	#3	#4	#5	#6	Result	Notes
1st place, gold medalist(s)	Eleftheria Christofi	Cyprus	12.75	x	13.20	13.17	12.98	12.83	13.20	
2nd place, silver medalist(s)	Rebecca Sare	Malta	11.41	11.99	12.08	11.71	11.80	x	12.08	
3rd place, bronze medalist(s)	Malory Malgherini	Monaco	x	11.13	x	x	11.40	11.10	11.40	
	Lise Boryna	Monaco	x	–	–	–	–	–	DNF	

=== Shot put ===
June 1

Rank	Name	Team	#1	#2	#3	#4	#5	#6	Result	Notes
1st place, gold medalist(s)	Florentia Kappa	Cyprus	15.19	15.13	15.36	14.87	x	–	15.36	GR
2nd place, silver medalist(s)	Stéphanie Krumlovsky	Luxembourg	12.48	12.97	x	12.40	12.76	x	12.97	
3rd place, bronze medalist(s)	Sveinbjörg Zophoníasdóttir	Iceland	12.04	x	12.25	11.87	12.03	12.49	12.49	
4	María Rún Gunnlaugsdóttir	Iceland	9.81	10.12	10.92	10.80	10.65	–	10.92	

=== Javelin throw ===
May 28

Rank	Name	Team	#1	#2	#3	#4	#5	#6	Result	Notes
1st place, gold medalist(s)	Ásdís Hjálmsdóttir	Iceland	x	53.61	53.97	56.15	x	54.86	56.15	
2nd place, silver medalist(s)	Inga Stasiulionytė	Monaco	46.51	x	46.83	x	43.35	x	46.83	
3rd place, bronze medalist(s)	María Rún Gunnlaugsdóttir	Iceland	x	x	46.44	x	x	40.16	46.44	
4	Noémie Pleimling	Luxembourg	x	x	x	45.21	42.70	46.32	46.32	
5	Eleni Mavroudi	Cyprus	40.79	x	x	41.49	x	38.72	41.49	
