= Monaco at the 2009 World Championships in Athletics =

- WA code: MON

in Berlin
- Competitors: 1
- Medals: Gold 0 Silver 0 Bronze 0 Total 0

World Championships in Athletics appearances
- 1987; 1991–1995; 1997; 1999; 2001; 2003; 2005; 2007; 2009; 2011; 2013; 2015; 2017; 2019; 2022; 2023

Monaco competed at the 2009 World Championships in Athletics from 15 to 23 August. A team of 1 athlete was announced in preparation for the competition.

== Team selection ==
Track and road events

| Event | Athletes | |
| Event | Men | Women |
|---|---|---|
| 1500 metres | Antoine Berlin | |

== Results ==
Track and road events

| Event | Athletes | Heats | | Semifinal | | Final | |
| Event | Athletes | Result | Rank | Result | Rank | Result | Rank |
|---|---|---|---|---|---|---|---|
| 1500 m | Antoine Berlin | 4:27.52 | 53 | did not advance | | | |
