= 2005 European Athletics U23 Championships – Women's long jump =

The women's long jump event at the 2005 European Athletics U23 Championships was held in Erfurt, Germany, at Steigerwaldstadion on 17 July.

== Medalists ==
Gold	Carolina Klüft; Sweden
Silver	Yuliya Zinovyeva; Russia
Bronze	Adina Anton; Romania

== Results ==
=== Final ===
17 July

Rank	Name	Nationality	Attempts						Result	Notes
Rank	Name	Nationality	1	2	3	4	5	6	Result	Notes
1st place, gold medalist(s)	Carolina Klüft	Sweden	6.65 (w: -0.2 m/s)	6.62 (w: 0.8 m/s)	6.63 (w: 1.0 m/s)	6.69 (w: 0.3 m/s)	6.79 (w: 0.8 m/s)	x	6.79 (w: 0.8 m/s)	
2nd place, silver medalist(s)	Yuliya Zinovyeva	Russia	6.02 (w: 0.2 m/s)	6.36 (w: 0.4 m/s)	6.46 (w: 0.7 m/s)	6.14 (w: 0.1 m/s)	6.58 (w: 1.3 m/s)	6.06 (w: 0.6 m/s)	6.58 (w: 1.3 m/s)	
3rd place, bronze medalist(s)	Adina Anton	Romania	6.37 (w: 0.9 m/s)	x	6.42 (w: 0.2 m/s)	6.55 (w: 1.8 m/s)	6.28 (w: 1.2 m/s)	6.39 (w: 1.7 m/s)	6.55 (w: 1.8 m/s)	
4	Elise Vesanes	France	6.44 (w: 1.2 m/s)	x	6.19 (w: -0.3 m/s)	x	6.21 w (w: 2.3 m/s)	6.37 (w: 0.8 m/s)	6.44 (w: 1.2 m/s)	
5	Olga Balayeva	Russia	5.84 (w: 0.1 m/s)	x	6.10 (w: 0.9 m/s)	6.35 w (w: 2.1 m/s)	x	6.41 (w: 1.5 m/s)	6.41 (w: 1.5 m/s)	
6	Narayane Dossevi	France	5.88 (w: 0.1 m/s)	6.13 (w: 0.9 m/s)	6.38 (w: 1.5 m/s)	6.38 (w: 0.7 m/s)	6.00 (w: -0.9 m/s)	6.29 (w: 1.2 m/s)	6.38 (w: 0.7 m/s)	
7	Dominika Miszczak	Poland	x	6.01 (w: 0.5 m/s)	6.09 (w: 0.7 m/s)	6.24 (w: 0.6 m/s)	5.97 (w: 0.4 m/s)	5.96 (w: 1.0 m/s)	6.24 (w: 0.6 m/s)	
8	Liubov Malla	Moldova	6.01 (w: 1.5 m/s)	5.51 (w: 0.1 m/s)	5.74 (w: 0.8 m/s)	5.45 (w: 0.5 m/s)	5.37 (w: -0.7 m/s)	5.70 (w: 0.8 m/s)	6.01 (w: 1.5 m/s)	
9	Darinka Yotova	Bulgaria	5.92 (w: -0.5 m/s)	5.81 (w: 0.7 m/s)	5.85 (w: 1.0 m/s)				5.92 (w: -0.5 m/s)	
10	Rebecca Camilleri	Malta	x	5.68 (w: 0.0 m/s)	5.67 (w: 1.5 m/s)				5.68 (w: 0.0 m/s)	
11	Lorena Álvarez	Andorra	3.11 (w: -0.7 m/s)	4.45 (w: 0.8 m/s)	4.71 w (w: 2.6 m/s)				4.71 w (w: 2.6 m/s)	

== Participation ==
According to an unofficial count, 11 athletes from 9 countries participated in the event.

- Andorra (1)
- Bulgaria (1)
- France (2)
- Malta (1)
- Moldova (1)
- Poland (1)
- Romania (1)
- Russia (2)
- Sweden (1)
