= Rebecca Camilleri =

Maltese athletics competitor

Rebecca Camilleri (born 6 July 1985) is a Maltese athlete specialising in the long jump and sprinting events. She represented her country at the World Indoor Championships, as well as two Commonwealth Games. In addition, she won multiple medals at the Games of the Small States of Europe.

== Competition record ==
Year	Competition	Venue	Position	Event	Notes
Representing Malta
2003	Games of the Small States of Europe	Marsa, Malta	3rd	Long jump	5.86 m
2003	European Junior Championships	Tampere, Finland	9th	Long jump	5.64 m
2005	Games of the Small States of Europe	Andorra la Vella, Andorra	2nd	Long jump	5.94 m
2005	European U23 Championships	Erfurt, Germany	10th	Long jump	5.68 m
2010	European Championships	Barcelona, Spain	24th (q)	Long jump	5.93 m
2010	Commonwealth Games	Delhi, India	13th (q)	Long jump	5.95 m
2011	Games of the Small States of Europe	Schaan, Liechtenstein	1st	4 × 100 m relay	46.30 s
2011	Games of the Small States of Europe	Schaan, Liechtenstein	2nd	Long jump	6.21 m
2012	World Indoor Championships	Istanbul, Turkey	36th (h)	60 m	7.68 s
2013	European Indoor Championships	Gothenburg, Sweden	23rd (h)	60 m	7.74 s
2013	Games of the Small States of Europe	Luxembourg, Luxembourg	7th (h)	100 m	12.26 s
2013	Games of the Small States of Europe	Luxembourg, Luxembourg	–	4 × 100 m relay	DQ
2013	Games of the Small States of Europe	Luxembourg, Luxembourg	4th	Long jump	5.82 m
2014	Commonwealth Games	Glasgow, United Kingdom	11th (h)	4 × 100 m relay	46.75 s
2014	Commonwealth Games	Glasgow, United Kingdom	9th	Long jump	6.23 m
2014	European Championships	Zürich, Switzerland	22nd (q)	Long jump	6.17 m
2015	Games of the Small States of Europe	Reykjavík, Iceland	2nd	Long jump	6.15 m

== Personal bests ==
Outdoor

- 100 metres – 12.04 (0.0 m/s) (Marsa, Malta 2013)
- Long jump – 6.41 (+0.5 m/s) (Marsa 2014)

Indoor

- 60 metres – 7.68 (Istanbul 2012)
- Long jump – 6.08 (Padova 2015)
