= Martina Pretelli =

Sammarinese sprinter

Personal information
- Born: 28 December 1988 (age 36) Borgo Maggiore, San Marino
- Height: 162 cm (5 ft 4 in)

Sport
- Sport: Athletics

Martina Pretelli (born 28 December 1988) is an athlete from San Marino who competes in the 100 metres. Pretelli competed for San Marino at the 2012 Summer Olympics in London in the 100 metres.

== Career ==
Pretelli competed with the 4 x 100 metres relay team that finished fifth at the 2005 Games of the Small States of Europe. She also competed with the 4 x 100 metres relay team at the 2007 Games of the Small States of Europe where they once again finished fifth. She competed in the 60 metres at the 2008 World Indoor Championships and finished seventh in her heat.

Pretelli competed at the 2009 Games of the Small States of Europe and finished sixth in the 100 metres, fourth in the 200 metres, fifth in the 4 × 100 meters relay, and sixth in the 4 × 400 meters relay. She then competed in the 100 metres at the 2009 World Championships and finished fifth in her heat and did not advance. Then at the 2010 World Indoor Championships, she finished 30th in the heats of the 60 metres.

At the 2011 Games of the Small States of Europe, Pretelli finished fourth in the 100 metres, fifth in the 200 metres, and fifth in the 4 x 100 meters relay. Then at the 2011 World Championships, she competed in the 100 metres and advanced from the preliminary round to finish 46th in the heats. She competed at the 2012 World Indoor Championships in the 60 metres and finished 41st in the heats.

Pretelli received a universality place for the 100 metres to represent San Marino at the 2012 Summer Olympics, becoming the country's first female athletics competitor since the 1976 Summer Olympics. Despite dealing with tendinitus, she competed in the preliminary round and finished third in her heat and 12th overall, failing to advance.

Pretelli competed at the 2013 Games of the Small States of Europe and finished sixth in the 200 metres and fourth in the 4 x 100 meters relay. Then at the 2013 World Championships, she finished 41st in the heats of the 100 metres.

== Personal life ==
Pretelli studied law at the University of Urbino.

== Competition record ==
Year	Competition	Venue	Position	Event	Notes
Representing San Marino
2005	Games of the Small States of Europe	Andorra la Vella, Andorra	5th	4 × 100 m relay	50.99
2007	Games of the Small States of Europe	Nicosia, Cyprus	5th	4 × 100 m relay	49.96
2008	World Indoor Championships	Valencia, Spain	34th (h)	60 m	8.54
2009	Games of the Small States of Europe	Nicosia, Cyprus	6th	100 m	12.49
2009	Games of the Small States of Europe	Nicosia, Cyprus	4th	200 m	25.48
2009	Games of the Small States of Europe	Nicosia, Cyprus	5th	4 × 100 m relay	50.53
2009	Games of the Small States of Europe	Nicosia, Cyprus	6th	4 × 400 m relay	4:07.75
2009	European U23 Championships	Kaunas, Lithuania	21st (h)	200m	26.43 (wind: 1.1 m/s)
2009	World Championships	Berlin, Germany	49th (h)	100 m	12.65
2010	World Indoor Championships	Doha, Qatar	30th (h)	60 m	7.94
2011	Games of the Small States of Europe	Schaan, Liechtenstein	4th	100 m	12.02 (NR)
2011	Games of the Small States of Europe	Schaan, Liechtenstein	5th	200 m	24.94 (NR)
2011	Games of the Small States of Europe	Schaan, Liechtenstein	5th	4 × 100 m relay	49.13 (NR)
2011	World Championships	Daegu, South Korea	46th (h)	100 m	12.27
2012	World Indoor Championships	Istanbul, Turkey	41st (h)	60 m	7.79
2012	Olympic Games	London, United Kingdom	12th (p)	100 m	12.41
2013	Games of the Small States of Europe	Luxembourg, Luxembourg	8th (h)	100 m	12.34
2013	Games of the Small States of Europe	Luxembourg, Luxembourg	6th	200 m	25.30
2013	Games of the Small States of Europe	Luxembourg, Luxembourg	4th	4 × 100 m relay	49.47
2013	World Championships	Moscow, Russia	41st (h)	100 m	12.73
2014	World Indoor Championships	Sopot, Poland	40th (h)	60 m	7.94
2014	European Championships	Zürich, Switzerland	36th (h)	100 m	12.68
