= List of Monégasque records in athletics =

The following are the national records in athletics in Monaco maintained by its national athletics federation: Fédération Monégasque d'Athlétisme (FMA).

== Outdoor ==
Key to tables: Awaiting ratification Record not kept by FMA Not ratified or later rescinded by FMA

=== Men ===
Event	Record	Athlete	Date	Meet	Place	Ref.
100 m	10.53 (+1.4 m/s)	Sébastien Gattuso	12 July 2008		Dijon, France	
200 m	21.89 (−0.1 m/s)	Sébastien Gattuso	5 June 2003	Games of the Small States of Europe	Marsa, Malta	
400 m	48.63	Brice Etès	3 June 2011	Games of the Small States of Europe	Schaan, Liechtenstein	
800 m	1:47.61	Brice Etès	22 July 2010	Herculis	Fontvieille, Monaco	
1000 m	2:35.70	Antoine Berlin	29 July 2008	Herculis	Fontvieille, Monaco	
1500 m	3:53.94	Brice Etès	27 September 2020		Vénissieux, France	
3000 m	8:33.82	Brice Etès	18 September 2020		Nice, France	
5000 m	14:48.2 h	Emile Battaglia	13 June 1948		Marseille, France	
5000 m	14:39.0 (Note: in a training trial)	Emile Battaglia	11 August 1946		Monaco	
5 km (road)	15:20 h	Brice Etès	11 October 2020		Chalon sur Saône, France	
10,000 m	32:00.76	Antoine Berlin	22 April 2010	Penn Relays	Philadelphia, United States	
10 km (road)	31:43	Antoine Berlin	14 June 2008		Langueux, France	
10 km (road)	30:30	Antoine Berlin	26 October 2008		Lausanne, Switzerland	
15 km (road)	51:48+	Nicolas D’Angelo	18 February 2024	Seville Marathon	Seville, Spain	
One hour	13590 m	Pierre Maccario	21 March 1998		Nice, France	
20 km (road)	1:09:14+	Nicolas D’Angelo	18 February 2024	Seville Marathon	Seville, Spain	
Half marathon	1:08:57	Antoine Berlin	8 March 2009	Paris Half Marathon	Paris, France	
25 km (road)	1:26:46+	Nicolas D’Angelo	18 February 2024	Seville Marathon	Seville, Spain	
30 km (road)	1:44:08+	Nicolas D’Angelo	18 February 2024	Seville Marathon	Seville, Spain	
Marathon	2:27:11	Nicolas D’Angelo	13 April 2025	European Running Championships	Brussels–Leuven, Belgium	
110 m hurdles	16.12	Anthony De Sevelinges	12 May 2005		Nice, France	
400 m hurdles	56.81	José-Manuel Gastaud	24 April 2019		Fayence, France	
3000 m steeplechase	10:35.97	Sébastien Garro	2 June 2007		Nice, France	
High jump	1.95 m	Yvan Ornella	2 May 1990		Nice, France	
Pole vault	3.60 m	Yvan Ornella	20 March 1988		Monaco	
Long jump	6.59 m (+0.3 m/s)	Anthony De Sevelinges	7 June 2007		Monaco	
Triple jump	12.76 m	Yvan Ornella	17 May 1989	Games of the Small States of Europe	Nicosia, Cyprus	
Shot put	11.67 m	Gaston Médecin	3 August 1928		Amsterdam, Netherlands	
Discus throw	34.89 m	Anthony de Sevelinges	18 May 2008		Aix-en-Provence, France	
Hammer throw						
Javelin throw	42.48 m	Anthony de Sevelinges	12 May 2005		Nice, France	
Decathlon	5683 pts	Anthony De Sevelinges	15–16 May 2004		Nice, France	
Decathlon	100m (wind) / Long jump (wind) / Shot put / High jump / 400m / 110m H (wind) / Discus / Pole vault / Javelin / 1500m; 11.91 / 6.41 m / 10.96 m / 1.80 m / 55.57 / 16.42 / 32.79 m / 3.20 m / 39.83 m / 5:03.67					
5000 m walk (track)	31:34.79	Pierre Maccario	9 May 1999		Nice, France	
20 km walk (road)						
50 km walk (road)						
4 × 100 m relay						
4 × 400 m relay						

=== Women ===
Event	Record	Athlete	Date	Meet	Place	Ref.
100 m	12.41 (−0.2 m/s)	Charlotte Afriat	18 April 2018		Monaco	
200 m	26.71 (−0.6 m/s)	Charlotte Afriat	29 April 2018		Cannes, France	
200 m	25.9 h (+0.2 m/s)	Charlotte Afriat	17 December 2017		Nice, France	
400 m	59.37	Marie-Charlotte Gastaud	6 July 2023		Cannes, France	
800 m	2:23.17	Marie-Cécile Rivetta	18 May 1989	Games of the Small States of Europe	Nicosia, Cyprus	
1500 m	5:23.92	Marie-Cécile Rivetta	11 July 1991		Athens, Greece	
3000 m	11:04.6	Marie-Cécile Rivetta	9 May 1990		Nice, France	
5000 m						
10,000 m	48:02.7 h	Adrienne Pastorelly	30 April 1988		Nice, France	
Half marathon	1:44:29	Adrienne Pastorelly	10 March 1996		Hyères, France	
Marathon	3:35:39	Adrienne Pastorelly	12 January 1992	Marrakech Marathon	Marrakesh, Morocco	
100 m hurdles	15.09	Carine Cresto	14 June 1994		Bondoufle, France	
100 m hurdles	15.04	Carine Cresto	18 April 1999		Cannes, France	
400 m hurdles	1:02.02	Marie-Charlotte Gastaud	3 June 2023	Games of the Small States of Europe	Marsa, Malta	
400 m hurdles	1:00.51	Marie-Charlotte Gastaud	5 July 2024	Souvenir Fihue	Cannes, France	
3000 m steeplechase						
High jump	1.58 m	Virginie Gollino	27 May 1995		Nice, France	
Pole vault	2.51 m	Ilona Chiabaut	26 May 2018		Nice, France	
Pole vault	2.70 m (Note: not ratified by federation but recognised by World Athletics)	Sarah Seggiaro	28 May 2017		Nice, France	
Long jump	5.35 m	Carine Cresto	7 June 1993		Innsbruck, Austria	
Triple jump	9.31 m	Marie-Charlotte Gastaud	21 May 2017		Aubagne, France	
Shot put	10.54 m	Carine Cresto	23 June 1991		Puteaux, France	
Discus throw	31.36 m	Suzie Ingold	11 March 1962		Nice, France	
Hammer throw	13.73 m	Vanessa Gazielo	8 May 2005		Nice, France	
Javelin throw	28.84 m	Carine Cresto	7 May 2000		Nice, France	
Heptathlon						
Heptathlon	100m H (wind) / High jump / Shot put / 200m (wind) / Long jump (wind) / Javelin / 800m					
20 km walk (road)						
50 km walk (road)						
4 × 100 m relay						
4 × 400 m relay						

=== Mixed ===
Event	Record	Athlete	Date	Meet	Place	Ref.
4 × 400 m relay	3:39.41	Monaco; Tristan Baldini; Sophie Robson; François Ducourant; Tetiana Sevluk-Lagoutte	27 May 2025	Games of the Small States of Europe	Andorra la Vella, Andorra	

== Indoor ==
=== Men ===
Event	Record	Athlete	Date	Meet	Place	Ref.
50 m	6.03	Sébastien Gattuso	5 January 2008		Nice, France	
60 m	6.94	Sébastien Gattuso	7 March 2008	World Championships	Valencia, Spain	
200 m	25.69	Arthur Auttier	8 January 2011	2ème Journee Preparatioire CJESV	Nice, France	
400 m	49.62	Brice Etès	31 January 2015		Lyon, France	
800 m	1:50.57	Brice Etès	19 February 2017		Bordeaux, France	
1500 m	3:56.58	Brice Etès	21 February 2016		Rennes, France	
3000 m	8:48.03	Antoine Berlin	16 January 2011	Regionaux CJES	Reims, France	
60 m hurdles	8.77	Anthony de Sevelinges	3 February 2007		Bompas, France	
High jump						
Pole vault	3.30 m	Anthony de Sevelinges	14 December 2003		Nice, France	
Long jump	6.12 m	Anthony de Sevelinges	14 December 2003		Nice, France	
Triple jump						
Shot put	10.68 m	Anthony de Sevelinges	14 December 2003		Nice, France	
Heptathlon						
Heptathlon	60m / Long jump / Shot put / High jump / 60m H / Pole vault / 1000m					
5000 m walk						
4 × 400 m relay						

=== Women ===
Event	Record	Athlete	Date	Meet	Place	Ref.
50 m	6.72	Charlotte Afriat	22 December 2017		Nice, France	
60 m	7.85	Charlotte Afriat	8 December 2019		Miramas, France	
200 m	26.34	Charlotte Afriat	12 January 2020		Miramas, France	
400 m	57.18	Marie-Charlotte Gastaud	24 January 2026	Régionaux Individuels	Miramas, France	
800 m	3:07.30	Carine Cresto	12 December 2004		Eaubonne, France	
1500 m						
3000 m						
60 m hurdles	9.72	Carine Cresto	4 February 2001		Paris, France	
High jump	1.33 m	Carine Cresto	12 December 2004		Eaubonne, France	
Pole vault						
Long jump	4.74 m	Charlotte Afriat	14 January 2017		Nice, France	
Triple jump						
Shot put	8.67 m	Carine Cresto	12 December 2004		Eaubonne, France	
Pentathlon	2371 pts	Carine Cresto	12 December 2004		Eaubonne, France	
Pentathlon	60m H / High jump / Shot put / Long jump / 800m; 9.94 / 1.33 m / 8.67 m / 4.65 m / 3:07.30					
3000 m walk						
4 × 400 m relay						
