= Amine Khadiri =

Cypriot middle-distance runner (born 1988)

Personal information
- Born: 20 November 1988 (age 36) Casablanca, Morocco
- Height: 1.70 m (5 ft 7 in)
- Weight: 60 kg (132 lb)

Sport
- Sport: Athletics
- Event(s): 1500 m, 5000 m

Amine Khadiri (Greek: Αμίν Χαντίρι; born 20 November 1988) is a Moroccan-born Cypriot middle-distance runner who competes primarily in the 1500 metres. He has won multiple medals at the Games of the Small States of Europe.

== International competitions ==
Year	Competition	Venue	Position	Event	Notes
Representing Cyprus
2011	Games of the Small States of Europe	Schaan, Liechtenstein	2nd	800 m	1:52.53
2011	Games of the Small States of Europe	Schaan, Liechtenstein	1st	1500 m	3:50.31
2013	Games of the Small States of Europe	Luxembourg City, Luxembourg	1st	800 m	1:53.15
2013	Games of the Small States of Europe	Luxembourg City, Luxembourg	1st	1500 m	3:54.20
2014	European Championships	Zürich, Switzerland	28th (h)	1500 m	3:50.15
2015	European Indoor Championships	Prague, Czech Republic	13th (h)	1500 m	3:47.61
2015	Games of the Small States of Europe	Reykjavík, Iceland	1st	800 m	1:56.72
2015	Games of the Small States of Europe	Reykjavík, Iceland	1st	1500 m	3:51.97
2015	Games of the Small States of Europe	Reykjavík, Iceland	2nd	4 x 400 m relay	3:17.86
2016	Championships of the Small States of Europe	Marsa, Malta	1st	3000 m	8:18.92
2016	European Championships	Amsterdam, Netherlands	25th (h)	1500 m	3:44.61
2017	Games of the Small States of Europe	Serravalle, San Marino	10th	5000 m	14:21.35
2018	Balkan Indoor Championships	Istanbul, Turkey	1st	1500 m	3:53.01
2018	Commonwealth Games	Gold Coast, Australia	10th	1500 m	3:40.76
2018	Commonwealth Games	Gold Coast, Australia	10th	5000 m	14:16.53
2018	European Championships	Berlin, Germany	19th (h)	1500 m	3:45.97
2022	Mediterranean Games	Oran, Algeria	5th	Half marathon	1:06:18
2025	Games of the Small States of Europe	Andorra la Vella, Andorra	2nd	5000 m	14:46.30
2025	Games of the Small States of Europe	Andorra la Vella, Andorra	2nd	10,000 m	31:06.47

== Personal bests ==
Outdoor

- 800 metres – 1:47.22 (Kessel-Lo 2015)
- 1000 metres – 2:20.37 NR (Cheb 2015)
- 1500 metres – 3:39.50 NR (Huelva 2016)
- One mile – 3:59.33 NR (Cork 2017)
- 3000 metres – 8:10.98 (Tel Aviv 2017)
- 5000 metres – 13:54.71 (Chorzów 2017)
- Half marathon – 1:02:02 NR (Marrakech 2023)
- Marathon - 2:10:20 NR (Seville 2023)

Indoor

- 1500 metres – 3:45.16 (Istanbul 2015)
- 3000 metres – 7:55.32 (Istanbul 2018)
