= Kári Steinn Karlsson =

Icelandic long-distance runner

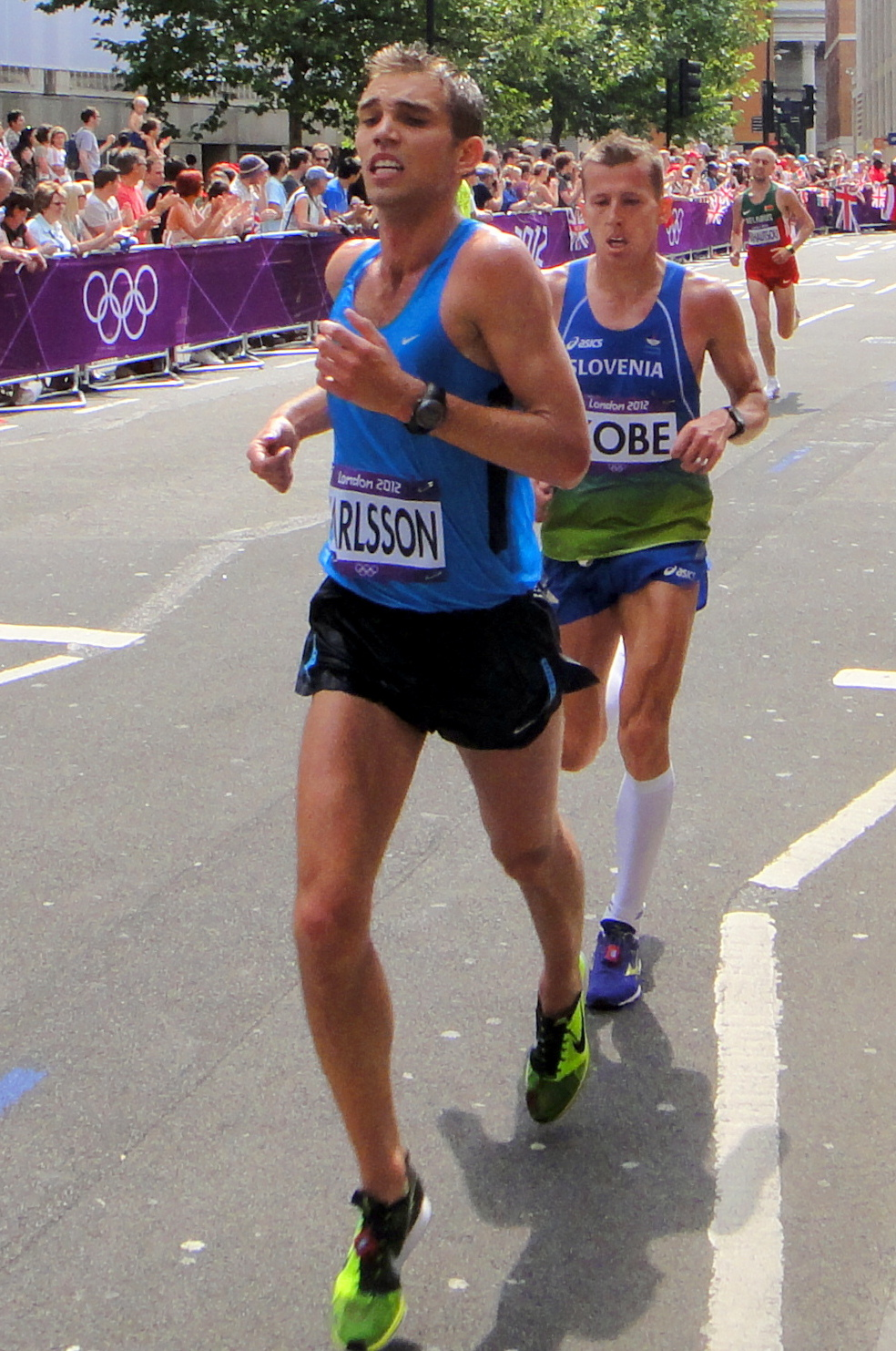
- Karlsson in the marathon at the 2012 Olympics in London

Personal information
- Born: 19 May 1986 (age 40) Iceland

Sport
- Country: Iceland
- Sport: Athletics
- Event: Marathon
Medal record
Games of the Small States of Europe
Silver medal – second place	Luxembourg 2013	5000 m
Bronze medal – third place	Luxembourg 2013	10000 m

Kári Steinn Karlsson (born 19 May 1986) is an Icelandic long-distance runner. At the 2012 Summer Olympics, he competed in the men's marathon, finishing in 42nd place. In 2016 Karlsson won the Montreal Marathon.

Karlsson went to University of California, Berkeley and competed for the men's California Golden Bears track and field team.
