= Óðinn Björn Þorsteinsson =

Icelandic shot putter (born 1981)

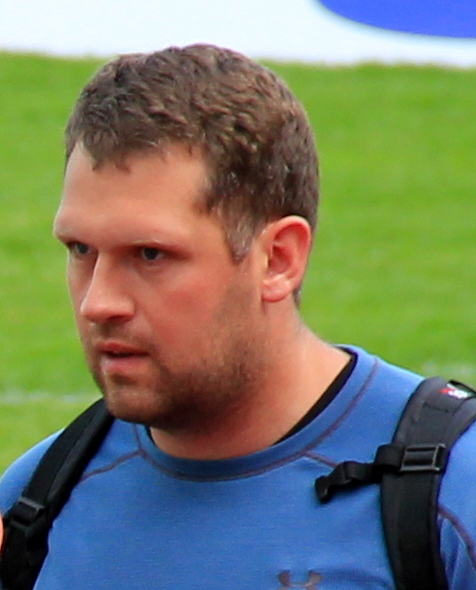

Personal information
- Born: 3 December 1981 (age 44) Reykjavík, Iceland
- Height: 2.00 m (6 ft 7 in)
- Weight: 110 kg (240 lb) (2012)

Sport
- Country: Iceland
- Sport: Athletics
- Event: Shot put
Medal record
Games of the Small States of Europe
Gold medal – first place	Andorra 2005	Shot put
Gold medal – first place	Liechtenstein 2011	Shot put
Silver medal – second place	Andorra 2005	Discus
Silver medal – second place	Luxembourg 2013	Shot put
- Updated on 30 January 2014

Óðinn Björn Þorsteinsson (born 3 December 1981 in Reykjavík) is an Icelandic athlete competing in the shot put and discus throw. He represented his country at the 2012 Summer Olympics without qualifying for the final.

== Competition record ==
Year	Competition	Venue	Position	Event	Notes
Representing Iceland
1999	European Junior Championships	Riga, Latvia	17th (q)	Discus throw	43.12 m
2001	European U23 Championships	Amsterdam, Netherlands	19th (q)	Discus throw	46.40 m
2003	European U23 Championships	Bydgoszcz, Poland	25th (q)	Discus throw	49.20 m
2005	Games of the Small States of Europe	Andorra la Vella, Andorra	1st	Shot put	17.15 m
2005	Games of the Small States of Europe	Andorra la Vella, Andorra	2nd	Discus throw	51.23 m
2010	European Championships	Barcelona, Spain	–	Shot put	NM
2011	European Indoor Championships	Paris, France	20th (q)	Shot put	17.31 m
2011	Games of the Small States of Europe	Schaan, Liechtenstein	1st	Shot put	19.73 m
2012	European Championships	Helsinki, Finland	22nd (q)	Shot put	18.19 m
2012	Olympic Games	London, United Kingdom	35th (q)	Shot put	17.62 m
2013	Games of the Small States of Europe	Luxembourg, Luxembourg	2nd	Shot put	18.22 m
2013	Games of the Small States of Europe	Luxembourg, Luxembourg	4th	Discus throw	50.14 m
2015	Games of the Small States of Europe	Reykjavík, Iceland	2nd	Shot put	18.10 m
2016	Championships of the Small States of Europe	Marsa, Malta	3rd	Shot put	18.38 m
2017	Games of the Small States of Europe	Serravalle, San Marino	3rd	Shot put	17.59 m

== Personal bests ==
Outdoor

- Shot put – 19.83 (Gothenburg 2011)
- Discus throw – 60.29 (Kópavogur 2008)
- Hammer throw – 48.04 (Hafnarfjördur 2005)

Indoor

- Shot put – 20.22 (Hafnarfjördur 2012)
