= Kevin Moore (sprinter) =

Australian-Maltese sprinter (born 1990)

Personal information
- Full name: Kevin Arthur Moore
- Born: 29 July 1990 (age 35) Malta

Sport
- Sport: Athletics
- Event(s): 100 m, 200 m, 400 m

Kevin Arthur Moore (born 29 July 1990) is a sprinter competing internationally for Malta. He initially represented Australia before switching allegiance to Malta, the country of birth of his late father, where Kevin also lived for the first six years of his life. He competed in the 400 metres at the 2013 World Championships without advancing from the first round.

In June 2016, he tested positive for three illegal substances and was banned from competition for four years. His sanction lasted from 11 June 2016 until 24 September 2020.

He is of Greek Cypriot Australian descent, through his mother.

== International competitions ==
Year	Competition	Venue	Position	Event	Notes
Representing Australia
2008	Commonwealth Youth Games	Pune, India	5th	200 m	21.76
2008	Commonwealth Youth Games	Pune, India	2nd	4 × 100 m relay	41.08
2010	Continental Cup	Split, Croatia	4th	4 × 400 m relay	3:03.66^{1}
2010	Commonwealth Games	New Delhi, India	1st	4 × 400 m relay	3:03.30
Representing Malta
2011	Games of the Small States of Europe	Schaan, Liechtenstein	1st	400 m	47.68
2011	Games of the Small States of Europe	Schaan, Liechtenstein	1st	4 × 400 m relay	3:18.39
2013	Games of the Small States of Europe	Luxembourg, Luxembourg	1st	400 m	47.53
2013	Games of the Small States of Europe	Luxembourg, Luxembourg	2nd	4 × 400 m relay	3:15.73
2013	World Championships	Moscow, Russia	28th (h)	400 m	47.52
2014	Commonwealth Games	Glasgow, United Kingdom	28th (h)	200 m	21.07
2014	European Championships	Zürich, Switzerland	28th (h)	100 m	10.49
2014	European Championships	Zürich, Switzerland	21st (h)	200 m	21.03
2015	Games of the Small States of Europe	Reykjavík, Iceland	1st	200 m	21.54
2015	Games of the Small States of Europe	Reykjavík, Iceland	1st	400 m	47.86
2016	European Championships	Amsterdam, Netherlands	–	100 m	DQ

^{1}Representing Asia-Pacific

== Personal bests ==
Outdoor

- 100 metres – 10.49 (0.0 m/s, Zürich 2014)
- 200 metres – 21.03 (-0.4 m/s, Zürich 2014)
- 400 metres – 46.13 (Sydney 2010)
