= Danijel Furtula =

Montenegrin discus thrower (born 1992)

Personal information
- Born: 31 July 1992 (age 33) Mojkovac, Montenegro, FR Yugoslavia
- Height: 1.95 m (6 ft 5 in)
- Weight: 115 kg (254 lb)

Sport
- Country: Montenegro
- Sport: Athletics
- Event: Discus
Medal record
Mediterranean Games
Bronze medal – third place	2013 Mersin	Discus throw
European U23 Championships
Bronze medal – third place	2013 Tampere	Discus throw
Games of the Small States of Europe
Gold medal – first place	2013 Luxembourg	Discus throw
Gold medal – first place	2013 Luxembourg	Shot put
Gold medal – first place	2019 Bar	Discus throw
European Junior Championships
Silver medal – second place	2011 Tallinn	Discus throw
- Updated on 30 May 2013

Danijel Furtula (born 31 July 1992 in Mojkovac) is a Montenegrin discus thrower who competed in the 2012 Summer Olympics, coming in 20th in qualification group 2 and not advancing. He won gold at the 2012 European Cup Winter Throwing in the under-23 category.

== Personal bests ==
=== Outdoor ===
Event	Performance	Date	Location	Notes
Shot put	18.46 m	11 August 2013	Zagreb, Croatia	
Discus throw	65.59 m	2021	Bar, Montenegro	NR

== Competition record ==
Year	Competition	Venue	Position	Event	Notes
Representing Montenegro
2009	World Youth Championships	Brixen, Italy	15th	Shot put (5 kg)	18.21 m
2009	World Youth Championships	Brixen, Italy	–	Discus throw (1.50 kg)	NM
2010	World Junior Championships	Moncton, Canada	12th	Discus throw (1.75 kg)	54.64 m
2011	European Junior Championships	Tallinn, Estonia	12th	Shot put (6 kg)	18.08 m
2011	European Junior Championships	Tallinn, Estonia	2nd	Discus throw (1.75 kg)	63.54 m
2012	European Cup Winter Throwing (U23)	Bar, Montenegro	11th	Shot put	17.10 m
2012	European Cup Winter Throwing (U23)	Bar, Montenegro	1st	Discus throw	60.24 m
2012	European Championships	Helsinki, Finland	19th (q)	Discus throw	60.18 m
2012	Olympic Games	London, United Kingdom	38th (q)	Discus throw	57.48 m
2013	European Cup Winter Throwing (U23)	Castellón, Spain	2nd	Shot put	18.18 m
2013	European Cup Winter Throwing (U23)	Castellón, Spain	1st	Discus throw	62.10 m
2013	Games of the Small States of Europe	Luxembourg, Luxembourg	1st	Shot put	18.43 m
2013	Games of the Small States of Europe	Luxembourg, Luxembourg	1st	Discus throw	62.83 m
2013	Mediterranean Games	Mersin, Turkey	3rd	Discus throw	61.44 m
2013	European U23 Championships	Tampere, Finland	3rd	Discus throw	61.61 m
2013	World Championships	Moscow, Russia	26th (q)	Discus throw	58.28 m
2014	European Championships	Zürich, Switzerland	17th (q)	Discus throw	60.23 m
2016	European Championships	Amsterdam, Netherlands	15th (q)	Discus throw	63.14 m
2016	Olympic Games	Rio de Janeiro, Brazil	–	Discus throw	NM
2019	World Championships	Doha, Qatar	18th (q)	Discus throw	62.12 m
2021	Olympic Games	Tokyo, Japan	24th (q)	Discus throw	59.93 m
2022	Championships of the Small States of Europe	Marsa, Malta	1st	Discus throw	61.48 m
2022	Mediterranean Games	Oran, Algeria	3rd	Discus throw	61.74 m
2022	European Championships	Munich, Germany	21st (q)	Discus throw	59.10 m
2023	Games of the Small States of Europe	Marsa, Malta	1st	Discus throw	62.79 m
2024	European Championships	Rome, Italy	30th (q)	Discus throw	57.74 m
2024	Championships of the Small States of Europe	Gibraltar	2nd	Discus throw	60.23 m
