= Antoine Berlin =

Monegasque racing cyclist (born 1989)

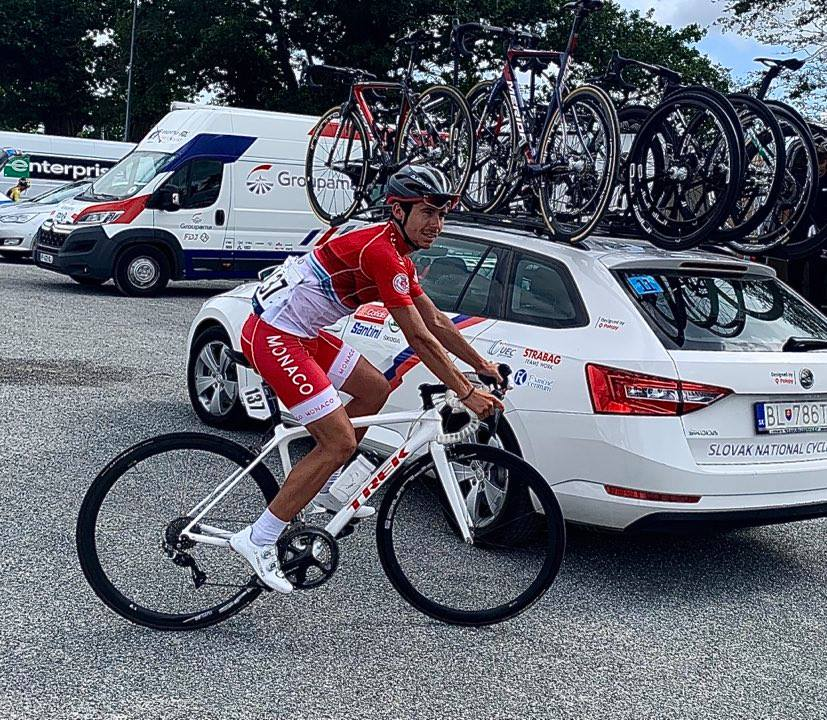
- Berlin at the 2020 European Road Championships

Personal information
- Born: 2 August 1989 (age 37) Monaco
- Height: 1.71 m (5 ft 7 in)
- Weight: 57 kg (126 lb)

Cycling career
- Sport: Cycling
- Current team: Retired
- Discipline: Road
- Role: Rider
- Rider type: Climber

Amateur team
- 2017–2019: Magnan Bornala Cyclisme

Professional teams
- 2020: Cambodia Cycling Academy
- 2021: Global 6 Cycling
- 2022: Nice Métropole Côte d'Azur
- 2023: Team Vorarlberg
- 2024–2025: Bike Aid

Antoine Berlin (born 2 August 1989) is a Monegasque former professional racing cyclist and long-distance runner.

== Career ==
=== Athletics ===
Before cycling, Berlin competed as a long-distance runner for AS Monaco. He holds the Monegasque national records for the 1000 metres, 10,000 metres, 10 km road race and the half marathon. He also competed in the 1500 metres at the 2009 World Championships in Athletics. In 2010, he moved to the United States to compete for East Carolina University, however his training was hindered by injuries.

In 2016, he retired from running after being unable to qualify for the 2016 Summer Olympics due to a pelvic stress fracture.

=== Cycling ===
Berlin took up cycling in May 2017 with the Magnan Bornala Cyclisme team in Nice. In 2020, he turned professional with UCI Continental team Cambodia Cycling Academy at the age of 30. After the team folded at the end of the season, he joined Global 6 Cycling in March 2021. With this team, he notably placed 13th at the Vuelta a Murcia and 8th overall Le Tour de Savoie Mont Blanc. In 2022, he transferred to French team Nice Métropole Côte d'Azur, for their first season at the UCI Continental level.

He retired at the end of the 2025 season.

==== Personal bests ====
Outdoor

- 1000 metres – 2:35.70 (Monaco 2008) NR
- 1500 metres – 4:04.55 (Villefranche-sur-Saone 2008) NU20R
- 3000 metres – 8:46.26 (Nice 2008) NU20R
- 5000 metres – 15:19.87 (Vénissieux 2008) NU20R
- 10,000 metres – 32:00.76 (Philadelphia 2010) NR

Indoor

- 3000 metres – 8:48.03 (Reims 2011) NR
- 5000 metres – 15:32.85 (Newport News 2010)

Road

- 10km 30:30 (Lausanne 2008) NR
- Half marathon – 1:08:57 (Paris 2009) NR

== Major results ==
2021
8th Overall Le Tour de Savoie Mont Blanc
2023
3rd Radsaison-Eröffnungsennen Leonding
6th Overall South Aegean Tour
2024
7th Overall Tour of Routhe Salvation
