= Charlotte Afriat =

Monegasque sprinter (born 2002)

Personal information
- Born: 17 October 2002 (age 23) Nice

Sport
- Country: Monaco
- Sport: Track and field
- Event: 100 metres

Charlotte Afriat (born 17 October 2002) is a Monegasque track and field athlete competing in sprinting events. She represented her country at the 2020 Summer Olympics.

== Career ==
Afriat represented Monaco at the 2018 Mediterranean Games held in Tarragona, Spain and she finished in 11th place in the women's 100 metres event. In the same year, she also competed in the girls' 100 metres at the Summer Youth Olympics held in Buenos Aires, Argentina. She was the flag bearer for Monaco during the opening ceremony of the 2018 Summer Youth Olympics.

Afriat competed in the women's 100 metres event at the 2019 Games of the Small States of Europe held in Budva, Montenegro and she finished in last place out of eight competitors. She also competed in the women's 100 metres event at the 2019 World Athletics Championships held in Doha, Qatar. She did not qualify to compete in the semi-finals.

In 2021, she competed in the women's 100 metres event at the 2020 Summer Olympics held in Tokyo, Japan. One of just six Monegasque athletes in her delegation, Afriat was the only track and field athlete to represent Monaco at the 2020 Summer Olympics.

In 2022, Afriat competed in the 60 metres event at the World Athletics Indoor Championships. Running in heat 5, she was the last to finish with a time of 8.06 seconds.

Afriat had appendix surgery and took time away from the sport, returning to competition at the 2024 World Athletics Indoor Championships. She did not qualify for the 2024 Summer Olympics in Paris.

== Personal life ==
Afriat's mother, Virginie Gollino, also represented Monaco in athletics. Gollino took part in the 100 metres hurdles in the 1997 World Championships in Athletics.
