= Diane Borg =

Maltese sprinter (born 1990)

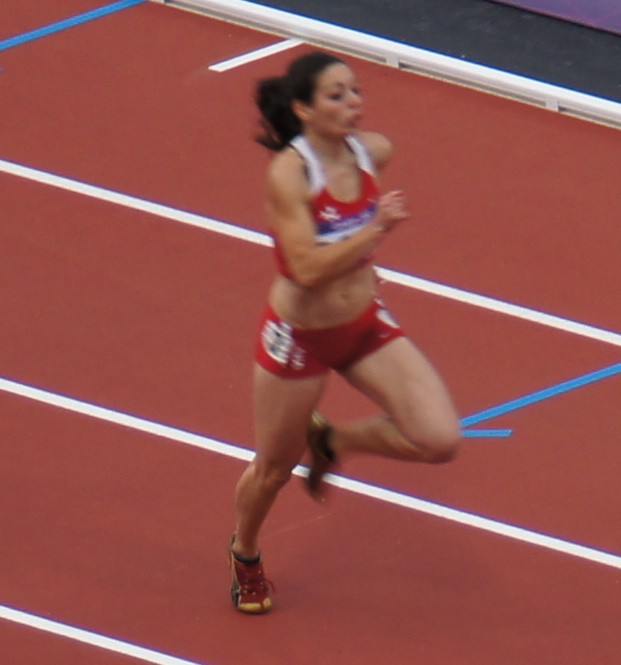
Diane Borg at the 2012 Summer Olympics

Diane Borg (born 12 September 1990 in Pietà, Malta) is a Maltese sprinter. She competed in the 100 metres at the 2012 Summer Olympics; running the preliminaries in 12.00 seconds to qualify for the first round, where her time of 11.92 seconds saw her finish eighth and unable to make it through to the semifinals.

At the 2014 Commonwealth Games, she competed in the 100 m, 200 m and 4 × 100 m relay, running a season's best in the 200 m.

Borg set her first senior national 100 metres record aged just 14 in 2005 and was named Sportswoman of the Year at the 2011 SportMalta awards.
