= Kyriakos Antoniou =

Cyprian footballer (born 2001)

Personal information
- Full name: Kyriakos Antoniou
- Date of birth: 3 May 2001 (age 25)
- Place of birth: Geroskipou, Cyprus
- Height: 1.89 m (6 ft 2 in)
- Position: Centre-back

Team information
- Current team: Dunav Ruse
- Number: 5

Youth career
- –2014: AE Paphos
- 2014–2018: Pafos

Senior career*
Years	Team	Apps	(Gls)
2018–2022	Pafos	26	(1)
2022	→ Akritas Chlorakas (loan)		
2022–2024	AEZ Zakakiou	41	(1)
2024–2026	Akritas Chlorakas	46	(2)
2026–	Dunav Ruse	11	(0)

International career^{‡}
2017–2018	Cyprus U-17	8	(0)
2019	Cyprus U-19	6	(0)
2020–2022	Cyprus U-21	2	(0)
- * Club domestic league appearances and goals as of 20:33, 10 November 2026 (UTC) ‡ National team caps and goals as of 20:33, 10 November 2026 (UTC)

Kyriakos Antoniou (born 7 May 2001) is a Cypriot professional footballer who plays as a defender for Bulgarian First League club Dunav Ruse.

== Career statistics ==
As of 17 January 2022

Appearances and goals by club, season and competition
Club	Season	League			National Cup		Europe		Other		Total	
Club	Season	Division	Apps	Goals	Apps	Goals	Apps	Goals	Apps	Goals	Apps	Goals
Pafos	2017–18	Cypriot First Division	0	0	1	0	0	0	0	0	1	0
Pafos	2018–19	Cypriot First Division	2	0	0	0	0	0	0	0	2	0
Pafos	2019–20	Cypriot First Division	12	1	1	0	0	0	0	0	13	1
Pafos	2020–21	Cypriot First Division	12	0	0	0	0	0	0	0	12	0
Pafos	2021–22	Cypriot First Division	0	0	1	0	0	0	0	0	1	0
Pafos	Total		26	1	3	0	0	0	0	0	29	1
Career total			26	1	3	0	0	0	0	0	29	1
