= Tiffany Tshilumba =

Luxembourgish sprinter

Personal information
- Nationality: Luxembourgish
- Born: 28 October 1996 (age 29)

Sport
- Sport: Track and field
- Event: 60m

Tiffany Tshilumba (born 28 October 1996) is a Luxembourgish sprinter. She competed in the 60 metres event at the 2014 IAAF World Indoor Championships. Her father is originally from the Democratic Republic of the Congo.
