= List of Games of the Small States of Europe records in athletics =

The Games of the Small States of Europe records in athletics set by athletes who are representing one of the eight European small states at the Games of the Small States of Europe. Records have been updated after the last Games, held in Reykjavík in 2015.

== Men's records ==
Event	Record	Name	Nationality	Date	Games	Place	Ref.
100 m	10.23 (+1.6 m/s)	Anninos Marcoullides	Cyprus	30 May 2001	2001 Games	Serravalle, San Marino	
200 m	20.83 (+1.6 m/s)	Prodromos Katsantonis	Cyprus	1999	1999 Games	Schaan, Liechtenstein	
400 m	45.81 PB	Téo Andant	Monaco	1 June 2023	2023 Games	Marsa, Malta	
800 m	1:47.85	Pol Moya	Andorra	27 May 2025	2025 Games	Andorra la Vella, Andorra	
1500 m	3:41.10 NR	Pol Moya	Andorra	1 June 2023	2023 Games	Marsa, Malta	
5000 m	13:51.77	Jordan Gusman	Malta	3 June 2023	2023 Games	Marsa, Malta	
10,000 m	29:37.96	Jordan Gusman	Malta	30 May 2023	2023 Games	Marsa, Malta	
110 m hurdles	13.86 (+1.6 m/s)	Milan Trajkovic	Cyprus	4 June 2015	2015 Games	Reykjavík, Iceland	
400 m hurdles	50.28	Costas Pochanis	Cyprus	1999	1999 Games	Schaan, Liechtenstein	
3000 m steeplechase	8:54.26	Stathis Stasi	Cyprus	30 May 2001	2001 Games	Serravalle, San Marino	
High jump	2.25 m	Einar Karl Hjartarson	Iceland	2 June 2001	2001 Games	Serravalle, San Marino	
High jump	2.25 m	Kyriakos Ioannou	Cyprus	2 June 2009	2009 Games	Nikosia, Cyprus	
Pole vault	5.55 m	Nikandros Stylianou	Cyprus	1 June 2017	2017 Games	Serravalle, San Marino	
Long jump	7.67 m (+1.3 m/s)	Kristinn Torfason	Iceland	3 June 2011	2011 Games	Schaan, Liechtenstein	
Triple jump	16.52 m	Marios Hadjiandreou	Cyprus	1991	1991 Games	Andorra la Vella, Andorra	
Shot put	20.57 m	Bob Bertemes	Luxembourg	29 May 2019	2019 Games	Bar, Montenegro	
Discus throw	64.15 m	Danijel Furtula	Montenegro	30 May 2019	2019 Games	Bar, Montenegro	
Hammer throw	70.60 m	Bergur Ingi Petursson	Iceland	2 June 2009	2009 Games	Nikosia, Cyprus	
Javelin throw	80.30 m	Sigurður Einarsson	Iceland	1991	1991 Games	Andorra la Vella, Andorra	
4 × 100 m relay	40.08	Anninos Marcoullides; Anthimos Rotos; Costantinos Kokkinos; Andreas Ioannou	Cyprus	7 June 2003	2003 Games	Marsa, Malta	
4 × 400 m relay	3:12.42	Téo Andant; Thomas Mironenko; Giovanni Molino; Karim Sfaxi	Monaco	3 June 2023	2023 Games	Marsa, Malta	

Key:
^{WR} World record	^{ER} European record	^{NR} National record	^{PB} Athlete's personal best

== Women's records ==
Event	Record	Name	Nationality	Date	Games	Place	Ref.
100 m	11.33 (−0.1 m/s)	Patrizia van der Weken	Luxembourg	30 May 2023	2023 Games	Marsa, Malta	
200 m	22.99 (+1.5 m/s)	Olivia Fotopoulou	Cyprus	3 June 2023	2023 Games	Marsa, Malta	
400 m	52.66	Androulla Sialou	Cyprus	5 June 2003	2003 Games	Marsa, Malta	
800 m	2:06.26	Tanya Blake	Malta	1 June 2001	2001 Games	Serravalle, San Marino	
1500 m	4:21.51	Vera Hoffmann	Luxembourg	30 May 2019	2019 Games	Bar, Montenegro	
3000 m	9:17.20	Danièle Kaber	Luxembourg	1989	1989 Games	Nikosia, Cyprus	
5000 m	16:19.31	Martha Ernstdóttir	Iceland	1995	1995 Games	Luxembourg, Luxembourg	
10,000 m	34:41.33	Irina Kazakova	Monaco	1 June 2001	2001 Games	Serravalle, San Marino	
100 m hurdles	13.01 (+0.2 m/s) NR	Natalia Christofi	Cyprus	1 June 2023	2023 Games	Marsa, Malta	
400 m hurdles	58.62	Kalypso Stavrou	Cyprus	31 May 2025	2025 Games	Andorra la Vella, Andorra	
3000 m steeplechase	11:02.11	Chrystalla Chadjipolydorou	Cyprus	1 June 2023	2023 Games	Marsa, Malta	
High jump	1.91 m	Marija Vuković	Montenegro	30 May 2017	2017 Games	Serravalle, San Marino	
Pole vault	4.40 m	Þórey Edda Elísdóttir	Iceland	2 June 2005	2005 Games	Andorra la Vella, Andorra	
Long jump	6.42 m (−0.3 m/s)	Hafdís Sigurðardóttir	Iceland	30 May 2019	2019 Games	Bar, Montenegro	
Triple jump	13.63 m (+1.3 m/s)	Nina Serbrzova	Cyprus	4 June 2011	2011 Games	Schaan, Liechtenstein	
Shot put	16.52 m	Erna Sóley Gunnarsdóttir	Iceland	29 May 2025	2025 Games	Andorra la Vella, Andorra	
Discus throw	54.60 m	Androniki Lada	Cyprus	31 May 2019	2019 Games	Bar, Montenegro	
Hammer throw	63.17 m	Emilia Kolokotroni	Cyprus	30 May 2023	2023 Games	Marsa, Malta	
Javelin throw	60.03 m	Ásdís Hjálmsdóttir	Iceland	30 May 2017	2017 Games	Serravalle, San Marino	
4 × 100 m relay	45.31 NR	Tiana Ósk Whitworth; Hrafnhild Eir Hermódsdóttir; Guðbjörg Bjarnadóttir; Arna Guðmundsdóttir	Iceland	3 June 2017	2017 Games	Serravalle, San Marino	
4 × 400 m relay	3:44.31	Þórdís Eva Steinsdóttir; Arna Stefanía Guðmundsdóttir; Aníta Hinriksdóttir; Hafdís Sigurðardóttir	Iceland	6 June 2015	2015 Games	Reykjavík, Iceland	
4 × 400 m relay	3:44.31	Kalypso Stavrou; Chryso Georgiou; Kalliopi Kountouri; Rafaela Demetriou	Cyprus	3 June 2023	2023 Games	Marsa, Malta	

== Mixed ==
Event	Record	Athlete	Nation	Date	Games	Place	Ref.
4 × 400 m relay	3:27.02	Markos Antoniades; Thekla Alexandrou; Paisios Dimitriadis; Kalliopi Kountouri	Cyprus	27 May 2025	2025 Games	Andorra la Vella, Andorra	
