= Athletics at the 2003 Games of the Small States of Europe =

- Dates: 3 – 7 June
- Host city: Marsa, Malta
- Venue: Matthew Micallef St. John Athletic Stadium
- Events: 29
- Participation: 150 athletes from 8 nations

Athletics at the 2003 Games of the Small States of Europe were held at the Matthew Micallef St. John Athletic Stadium in Marsa, Malta between 3 and 7 June.

== Medal summary ==
=== Men ===
Event	Gold		Silver		Bronze	
100 metres	Anninos Marcoullides (CYP)	10.38	Anthimos Rotos (CYP)	10.44	Darren Gilford (MLT)	10.56
200 metres	Anninos Marcoullides (CYP)	20.95	Daniel Abenzoar-Foulé (LUX)	21.15	Gian Nicola Berardi (SMR)	21.68
400 metres	Marios Mardas (CYP)	47.51	Nikolai Portelli (MLT)	48.14	Evripides Demosthenous (CYP)	48.19
800 metres	David Fiegen (LUX)	1:51.52	Constantinos Hadjimarcou (CYP)	1:52.17	Víctor Martínez (AND)	1:52.66
1500 metres	Björn Margeirsson (ISL)	3:48.53	Christos Papapetrou (CYP)	3:50.55	Víctor Martínez (AND)	3:51.19
5000 metres	Mustapha Tantan (MON)	14:43.28	Frederick Baldacchino (MLT)	14:43.40	Toni Bernadó (AND)	
10,000 metres	Toni Bernadó (AND)	30:57.33	Joan Ramon Moya (AND)	30:59.48	Frederick Baldacchino (MLT)	31:02.88
3000 metres steeplechase	Panayiotis Kyprianou (CYP)	8:56.18 GR	Pascal Groben (LUX)	9:00.50	Pep Sansa (AND)	9:04.44
4×100 metres relay	Cyprus; Anninos Marcoullides; Anthimos Rotos; Costantinos Kokkinos; Andreas Ioannou	40.08 GR	Malta; Darren Gilford; Mario Bonello; Nikolai Portelli; Rachid Chouhal	41.00	San Marino; Marcello Carattoni; Federico Gorrieri; Gian Nicola Berardi; Fabrizio Righi	41.71
4×400 metres relay	Cyprus; Evripides Demosthenous; George Aphamis; Stephanos Hadjinicolaou; Marios Mardas	3:12.51 GR	Luxembourg; Jeff Steffen; Jeff Reuter; Daniel Abenzoar-Foulé; Claude Godart	3:15.53	Malta; Rachid Chouhal; Karl Farrugia; Mario Bonello; Nikolai Portelli	3:16.18
Long jump	Rachid Chouhal (MLT)	7.50	Costantinos Proestos (CYP)	6.99	Andrea Athanasiou (CYP)	6.97
Triple jump	Stelios Kapsalis (CYP)	15.20	Stelios Petrou (CYP)	15.07	Jónas Hallgrímsson (ISL)	14.91
Shot put	Georgios Arestis (CYP)	15.98	Petros Mitsides (CYP)	15.71	Odimm Thorstansson (ISL)	15.53
Discus throw	Magn Hallgrimsson (ISL)	59.01	Petros Mitsides (CYP)	52.29	Georgios Arestis (CYP)	52.03
Javelin throw	Pieros Tsissios (CYP)	67.17	Panayiotis Kalogerou (CYP)	68.00	Gabriele Mazza (SMR)	71.70

=== Women ===
Event	Gold		Silver		Bronze	
100 metres	Marilia Gregoriou (CYP)	11.67 GR	Sunna Gestsdóttir (ISL)	12.02	Silja Úlfarsdóttir (ISL)	12.24
200 metres	Marilia Gregoriou (CYP)	23.56	Sunna Gestsdóttir (ISL)	24.36	Eleni Artymata (CYP)	24.91
400 metres	Androulla Sialou (CYP)	52.66 GR	Tanya Blake (MLT)	54.46	Alissa Kallinikou (CYP)	54.92
800 metres	Tanya Blake (MLT)	2:07.21	Anne Christofidou (CYP)	2:08.74	Nobili Martine (LUX)	2:12.63
1500 metres	Tanya Blake (MLT)	4:29.01	Elisa Vagnini (SMR)	4:31.35	Gavriela Sofokleous (CYP)	4:35.08
5000 metres	Friða Rún Þórðardóttir (ISL)	17:10.14	Martha Erntsdóttir (ISL)	17:12.66	Giselle Camilleri (MLT)	17:26.96
10,000 metres	Carol Galea (MLT)	36:13.97	Silvia Felipo (AND)	38:29.43	Mariana Weber (MON)	39:27.77
100 metres hurdles	Evmorfia Baourda (CYP)	13.99	Xenia Herodotou (CYP)	15.16	Vilborg Jóhannsdóttir (ISL)	15.36
4×100 metres relay	Cyprus; Stella Charalambous; Eleni Artymata; Melina Menelaou; Marilia Gregoriou	47.71	Malta; Therese Mallia; Celine Pace; Deirdre Farrugia; Suzanne Spiteri	48.05	Iceland; Vilborg Jóhannsdóttir; Sigurbjörg Ólafsdóttir; Silja Úlfarsdóttir; Sunna Gestsdóttir	50.28
4×400 metres relay	Cyprus; Anne Christofidou; Gavriela Sofokleous; Theodora Kyriacou; Alissa Kallinikou	3:44.48 GR	Malta; Charlene Attard; Suzanne Spiteri; Celine Pace; Tanya Blake	3:45.69	Iceland; Sigurbjörg Ólafsdóttir; Vilborg Jóhannsdóttir; Sunna Gestsdóttir; Silja Úlfarsdóttir	3:53.19
Long jump	Irini Charalambous (CYP)	6.46 GR	Sunna Gestsdóttir (ISL)	6.30	Rebecca Camilleri (MLT)	5.86
Triple jump	Maria Diikiti (CYP)	12.89 GR	Thomaid Polidorou (CYP)	12.22	Lara Gerada (MLT)	11.90
Discus throw	Alexandra Klatsia (CYP)	41.38	Ásdís Hjálmsdóttir (ISL)	40.94	Halla Heimisdóttir (ISL)	40.23
Javelin throw	Sigrún Fjeldstedottir (ISL)	47.80	Vigdís Guðjónsdóttir (ISL)	47.36	Carla Lella (CYP)	45.90

== Men's results ==
=== 100 metres ===
Heats – June 3
Wind:
Heat 1: +2.3 m/s, Heat 2: +1.8 m/s

Rank	Heat	Name	Nationality	Time	Notes
1	2	Anthimos Rotos	Cyprus	10.38	Q
2	1	Darren Gilford	Malta	10.56	Q
3	1	Anninos Marcoullides	Cyprus	10.59	Q
4	2	Rachid Chouhal	Malta	10.64	Q
5	2	Sébastien Gattuso	Monaco	10.73	Q
6	1	Michel Arlanda	Monaco	10.74	Q
7	1	Rajnir Ólafsson	Iceland	10.91	q
7	2	Gian Nicola Berardi	San Marino	10.91	q
9	2	Bjarni Traustason	Iceland	11.08	

Final – June 3
Wind:
+0.5 m/s

Rank	Name	Nationality	Time	Notes
1st place, gold medalist(s)	Anninos Marcoullides	Cyprus	10.38	
2nd place, silver medalist(s)	Anthimos Rotos	Cyprus	10.44	
3rd place, bronze medalist(s)	Darren Gilford	Malta	10.56	
4	Gian Nicola Berardi	San Marino	10.60	NR
5	Sébastien Gattuso	Monaco	10.75	
6	Rajnir Ólafsson	Iceland	10.82	
7	Michel Arlanda	Monaco	10.87	
8	Rachid Chouhal	Malta	11.33	

=== 200 metres ===
Heats – June 5
Wind:
Heat 1: -0.1 m/s, Heat 2: -1.0 m/s

Rank	Heat	Name	Nationality	Time	Notes
1	1	Anninos Marcoullides	Cyprus	21.12	Q
2	1	Daniel Abenzoar-Foulé	Luxembourg	21.32	Q
3	1	Mario Bonello	Malta	21.70	Q
4	1	Gian Nicola Berardi	San Marino	21.87	q
5	1	Sébastien Gattuso	Monaco	21.89	q, NR
6	2	Rachid Chouhal	Malta	21.98	Q
7	2	Stephanos Hadjinicolaou	Cyprus	22.28	Q
8	2	Bjarni Traustason	Iceland	22.52	Q
9	2	Christian Kemp	Luxembourg	22.79	
10	2	Fabrizio Righi	San Marino	23.10	

Final – June 7
Wind:
+0.3 m/s

Rank	Name	Nationality	Time	Notes
1st place, gold medalist(s)	Anninos Marcoullides	Cyprus	20.95	
2nd place, silver medalist(s)	Daniel Abenzoar-Foulé	Luxembourg	21.15	
3rd place, bronze medalist(s)	Gian Nicola Berardi	San Marino	21.68	PB
4	Mario Bonello	Malta	21.73	
5	Stephanos Hadjinicolaou	Cyprus	21.99	
6	Rachid Chouhal	Malta	22.20	
7	Bjarni Traustason	Iceland	22.53	
	Sébastien Gattuso	Monaco	DNF	

=== 400 metres ===
Heats – June 3

Rank	Heat	Name	Nationality	Time	Notes
1	2	Marios Mardas	Cyprus	48.47	Q
2	2	Nikolai Portelli	Malta	48.95	Q
3	1	Evripides Demosthenous	Cyprus	49.06	Q
4	1	Karl Farrugia	Malta	50.02	Q
5	1	Björgvin Vikingsson	Iceland	50.28	Q
6	2	Jeff Reuter	Luxembourg	50.52	Q
7	1	Jeff Steffen	Luxembourg	50.76	q
8	2	Ragnar Frostasson	Iceland	51.17	q
9	1	Mehdi Kheddar	Monaco	51.18	
10	2	Sébastien Androt	Monaco	51.33	

Final – June 5

Rank	Name	Nationality	Time	Notes
1st place, gold medalist(s)	Marios Mardas	Cyprus	47.51	
2nd place, silver medalist(s)	Nikolai Portelli	Malta	48.14	NR
3rd place, bronze medalist(s)	Evripides Demosthenous	Cyprus	48.19	
4	Karl Farrugia	Malta	49.36	
5	Jeff Reuter	Luxembourg	49.98	
6	Jeff Steffen	Luxembourg	50.44	
7	Björgvin Vikingsson	Iceland	50.48	
8	Ragnar Frostasson	Iceland	50.67	

=== 800 metres ===
June 3

Rank	Name	Nationality	Time	Notes
1st place, gold medalist(s)	David Fiegen	Luxembourg	1:51.52	
2nd place, silver medalist(s)	Constantinos Hadjimarcou	Cyprus	1:52.17	
3rd place, bronze medalist(s)	Víctor Martínez	Andorra	1:52.66	
4	Brice Etès	Monaco	1:53.13	
5	Jean-Marc Leandro	Monaco	1:56.38	
6	Antonis Melas	Cyprus	1:57.38	
7	Mark Herrera	Malta	1:57.97	
8	Fabio Spiteri	Malta	2:00.01	
9	Daniel Macial	Andorra	2:01.64	
10	Florian Hilti	Liechtenstein	2:05.44	
11	Björn Mergersson	Iceland	2:44.03	
12	Ragnor Frostasson	Iceland	2:44.45	

=== 1500 metres ===
June 7

Rank	Name	Nationality	Time	Notes
1st place, gold medalist(s)	Björn Mergersson	Iceland	3:48.53	
2nd place, silver medalist(s)	Christos Papapetrou	Cyprus	3:50.55	
3rd place, bronze medalist(s)	Víctor Martínez	Andorra	3:51.19	
4	Georgios Loucaides	Cyprus	3:51.39	
5	Jean-Marc Leandro	Monaco	3:53.89	
6	Kais Adli	Monaco	3:54.70	
7	Christian Thielen	Luxembourg	3:56.01	
8	Alex Busuttil	Malta	3:56.45	
9	Florian Hilti	Liechtenstein	3:58.84	
10	Pere Cornellà	Andorra	4:00.32	
11	Mark Herrera	Malta	4:01.24	

=== 5000 metres ===
June 3

Rank	Name	Nationality	Time	Notes
1st place, gold medalist(s)	Toni Bernadó	Andorra	14:29.93	
2nd place, silver medalist(s)	Joan Ramon Moya	Andorra	14:31.51	
3rd place, bronze medalist(s)	Frederic Baldacchino	Malta	14:35.52	
4	Mustapha Tantan	Monaco	14:38.85	
5	Georgios Loucaides	Cyprus	14:41.11	
6	Christos Papapetrou	Cyprus	14:59.37	
7	Vincent Nothum	Luxembourg	15:00.94	
8	John Buhagiar	Malta	15:01.60	

=== 10,000 metres ===
June 5

Rank	Name	Nationality	Time	Notes
1st place, gold medalist(s)	Toni Bernadó	Andorra	30:57.33	
2nd place, silver medalist(s)	Joan Ramon Moya	Andorra	30:59.48	
3rd place, bronze medalist(s)	Frederic Baldacchino	Malta	31:02.88	
4	Charles Cilia	Malta	31:31.97	
5	Renos Theodorou	Cyprus	31:35.21	
6	Costas Constantinou	Cyprus	32:35.25	
	Mustapha Tantan	Monaco	DNF	

=== 3000 metres steeplechase ===
June 3

Rank	Name	Nationality	Time	Notes
1st place, gold medalist(s)	Panayiotis Kyprianou	Cyprus	8:56.18	
2nd place, silver medalist(s)	Pascal Groben	Luxembourg	9:00.50	
3rd place, bronze medalist(s)	Josep Sansa	Andorra	9:04.44	
4	Renos Theodorou	Cyprus	9:15.48	
5	Jamal Baaziz	Monaco	9:17.12	
6	Pere Cornellà	Andorra	9:18.53	

=== 4 x 100 metres relay ===
June 7

Rank	Nation	Competitors	Time	Notes
1st place, gold medalist(s)	Cyprus	Anninos Marcoullides, Anthimos Rotos, Costantinos Kokkinos, Andreas Ioannou	40.08	GR
2nd place, silver medalist(s)	Malta	Darren Gilford, Mario Bonello, Nikolai Portelli, Rachid Chouhal	41.00	
3rd place, bronze medalist(s)	San Marino	Marcello Carattoni, Federico Gorrieri, Gian Nicola Berardi, Fabrizio Righi	41.71	NR
4	Iceland	Rajnir Ólafsson, Bjarni Traustason, Guðmundur Jónsson, Ragnor Frostasson	43.48	
	Monaco	Frédéric Vidal, Sébastien Gattuso, Sébastien Rousset, Michel Arlanda	DQ	

=== 4 x 400 metres relay ===
June 7

Rank	Nation	Competitors	Time	Notes
1st place, gold medalist(s)	Cyprus	Evripides Demosthenous, George Aphamis, Stephanos Hadjinicolaou, Marios Mardas	3:12.51	GR
2nd place, silver medalist(s)	Luxembourg	Jeff Steffen, Jeff Reuter, Daniel Abenzoar-Foulé, Claude Godart	3:15.53	
3rd place, bronze medalist(s)	Malta	Rachid Chouhal, Karl Farrugia, Mario Bonello, Nikolai Portelli	3:16.18	NR
4	Monaco	Mehdi Kheddar, Marc De Marino, Sébastien Androt, Brice Etès	3:20.19	
5	Iceland	Bjarni Traustason, Ragnor Frostasson, Björn Mergersson, Björgvin Vikingsson	3:20.99	

=== Long jump ===
June 5

Rank	Name	Nationality	Result	Notes
1st place, gold medalist(s)	Rachid Chouhal	Malta	7.50	
2nd place, silver medalist(s)	Costantinos Proestos	Cyprus	6.99	
3rd place, bronze medalist(s)	Andrea Athanasiou	Cyprus	6.97	
4	Jónas Hallgrímsson	Iceland	6.92	
5	Federico Gorrieri	San Marino	6.86	
6	Moïse Louisy-Louis	Monaco	6.76	
7	Bjarn Traustason	Iceland	6.73	
	Luca Maccapani	San Marino	NM	

=== Triple jump ===
June 3

Rank	Name	Nationality	Result	Notes
1st place, gold medalist(s)	Stelios Kapsalis	Cyprus	15.20	
2nd place, silver medalist(s)	Stelios Petrou	Cyprus	15.07	
3rd place, bronze medalist(s)	Jónas Hallgrímsson	Iceland	14.91	
4	Federico Gorrieri	San Marino	14.71	NR
5	Manuel Pulis	Malta	14.47	

=== Shot put ===
June 3

Rank	Name	Nationality	Result	Notes
1st place, gold medalist(s)	Georges Aresti	Cyprus	15.98	
2nd place, silver medalist(s)	Petros Mitsides	Cyprus	15.71	
3rd place, bronze medalist(s)	Odimm Thorstansson	Iceland	15.53	
4	Magnus Hallgrimsson	Iceland	15.31	
5	Ángel Moreno	Andorra	11.87	
6	Nichola Camilleri	Malta	11.82	

=== Discus throw ===
June 3

Rank	Name	Nationality	Result	Notes
1st place, gold medalist(s)	Magnus Hallgrimsson	Iceland	59.01	
2nd place, silver medalist(s)	Petros Mitsides	Cyprus	52.29	
3rd place, bronze medalist(s)	Georges Aresti	Cyprus	52.03	
4	Odimm Thorstansson	Iceland	48.99	
5	Ángel Moreno	Andorra	42.43	
6	Mario Mifsud	Malta	33.27	

=== Javelin throw ===
June 5

Rank	Name	Nationality	Result	Notes
1st place, gold medalist(s)	Panyiotis Kalogerou	Cyprus	72.10	
2nd place, silver medalist(s)	Gabriele Mazza	San Marino	66.50	
3rd place, bronze medalist(s)	Antoine Collette	Luxembourg	65.83	
4	Ioannis Stylianou	Cyprus	62.72	
5	René Michlig	Liechtenstein	62.09	
6	Moïse Louisy-Louis	Monaco	61.36	
7	Guðmundur Jónsson	Iceland	60.55	
8	Jean-Paul Callus	Malta	52.62	
9	Adrià Pérez	Andorra	51.01	
10	Edwin Zammit	Malta	44.28	

== Women's results ==
=== 100 metres ===
Heats – June 3
Wind:
Heat 1: +0.5 m/s, Heat 2: +0.8 m/s

Rank	Heat	Name	Nationality	Time	Notes
1	1	Marilia Gregoriou	Cyprus	11.48	Q, GR
2	1	Sunna Gestsdóttir	Iceland	12.03	Q
3	2	Eleni Artymata	Cyprus	12.16	Q
4	2	Celine Pace	Malta	12.17	Q
5	2	Silja Úlfarsdóttir	Iceland	12.25	Q
6	2	Martina Walser	Liechtenstein	12.37	q
7	1	Sandra Frisch	Luxembourg	12.54	Q
8	1	Suzanne Spiteri	Malta	12.61	q
9	2	Chantal Hayen	Luxembourg	12.62	
10	1	Sara Maroncelli	San Marino	13.39	

Final – June 3
Wind:
+1.6 m/s

Rank	Name	Nationality	Time	Notes
1st place, gold medalist(s)	Marilia Gregoriou	Cyprus	11.67	
2nd place, silver medalist(s)	Sunna Gestsdóttir	Iceland	12.02	
3rd place, bronze medalist(s)	Silja Úlfarsdóttir	Iceland	12.24	
4	Eleni Artymata	Cyprus	12.25	
5	Celine Pace	Malta	12.38	
6	Suzanne Spiteri	Malta	12.60	
7	Martina Walser	Liechtenstein	12.73	
8	Sandra Frisch	Luxembourg	12.76	

=== 200 metres ===
Heats – June 5
Wind:
Heat 1: -0.2 m/s, Heat 2: -1.6 m/s

Rank	Heat	Name	Nationality	Time	Notes
1	1	Marilia Gregoriou	Cyprus	23.65	Q
2	1	Sunna Gestsdóttir	Iceland	24.30	Q
3	2	Silja Úlfarsdóttir	Iceland	24.67	Q
4	2	Eleni Artymata	Cyprus	25.05	Q
5	2	Martina Walser	Liechtenstein	25.12	Q
6	2	Celine Pace	Malta	25.16	q
7	1	Suzanne Spiteri	Malta	25.74	Q
8	1	Sandra Frisch	Luxembourg	26.17	q
9	2	Chantal Hayen	Luxembourg	26.43	
10	1	Imma Sabaté	Andorra	28.57	

Final – June 7
Wind:
0.0 m/s

Rank	Name	Nationality	Time	Notes
1st place, gold medalist(s)	Marilia Gregoriou	Cyprus	23.56	
2nd place, silver medalist(s)	Sunna Gestsdóttir	Iceland	24.36	
3rd place, bronze medalist(s)	Eleni Artymata	Cyprus	24.91	
4	Celine Pace	Malta	25.04	
5	Martina Walser	Liechtenstein	25.31	
6	Suzanne Spiteri	Malta	25.78	
7	Sandra Frisch	Luxembourg	25.95	
	Silja Úlfarsdóttir	Iceland	DNS	

=== 400 metres ===
June 5

Rank	Name	Nationality	Time	Notes
1st place, gold medalist(s)	Androulla Sialou	Cyprus	52.66	GR
2nd place, silver medalist(s)	Tanya Blake	Malta	54.46	
3rd place, bronze medalist(s)	Alissa Kallinikou	Cyprus	54.92	
4	Charlene Attard	Malta	57.66	
5	Irène Tiéndrebeogo	Monaco	57.69	
6	Lucille Maes	Monaco	1:00.11	
7	Imma Sabaté	Andorra	1:05.16	
	Silja Úlfarsdóttir	Iceland	DNF	

=== 800 metres ===
June 3

Rank	Name	Nationality	Time	Notes
1st place, gold medalist(s)	Tanya Blake	Malta	2:07.21	
2nd place, silver medalist(s)	Anne Christofidou	Cyprus	2:08.74	
3rd place, bronze medalist(s)	Martine Nobili	Luxembourg	2:12.63	
4	Caroline Mangion	Monaco	2:15.16	
5	Gavriela Sofokleous	Cyprus	2:16.19	
6	Friða Rún Þórðardóttir	Iceland	2:23.55	

=== 1500 metres ===
June 7

Rank	Name	Nationality	Time	Notes
1st place, gold medalist(s)	Tanya Blake	Malta	4:29.01	NR
2nd place, silver medalist(s)	Elisa Vagnini	San Marino	4:31.35	
3rd place, bronze medalist(s)	Gavriela Sofokleous	Cyprus	4:35.08	
4	Friða Rún Þórðardóttir	Iceland	4:41.11	
5	Martha Ernstdóttir	Iceland	4:43.65	
6	Silvia Felipo	Andorra	4:54.80	
7	Lisa Camilleri	Malta	5:02.86	
	Anne Christofidou	Cyprus	DNF	

=== 5000 metres ===
June 5

Rank	Name	Nationality	Time	Notes
1st place, gold medalist(s)	Friða Rún Þórðardóttir	Iceland	17:10.14	
2nd place, silver medalist(s)	Martha Ernstdóttir	Iceland	17:12.66	
3rd place, bronze medalist(s)	Giselle Camilleri	Malta	17:26.96	
4	Silvia Felipo	Andorra	18:12.70	
5	Mariana Weber	Monaco	18:37.73	
6	Stephanie Sofocleous	Cyprus	18:49.36	
	Carol Galea	Malta	DNF	
	Elisa Vagnini	San Marino	DNF	

=== 10,000 metres ===
June 3

Rank	Name	Nationality	Time	Notes
1st place, gold medalist(s)	Carol Galea	Malta	36:13.97	
2nd place, silver medalist(s)	Silvia Felipo	Andorra	38:29.43	
3rd place, bronze medalist(s)	Mariana Weber	Monaco	39:27.77	

=== 100 metres hurdles ===
June 5
Wind: +1.2 m/s

Rank	Name	Nationality	Time	Notes
1st place, gold medalist(s)	Evmorfia Baourda	Cyprus	13.99	
2nd place, silver medalist(s)	Xenia Herodotou	Cyprus	15.16	
3rd place, bronze medalist(s)	Vilborg Jóhannsdóttir	Iceland	15.36	
4	Sigurbjörg Ólafsdóttir	Iceland	16.50	
	Vicky Barbera	Andorra	DNF	

=== 4 x 100 metres relay ===
June 7

Rank	Nation	Competitors	Time	Notes
1st place, gold medalist(s)	Cyprus	Stella Charalambous, Eleni Artymata, Melina Menelaou, Marilia Gregoriou	47.71	
2nd place, silver medalist(s)	Malta	Therese Mallia, Celine Pace, Deirdre Farrugia, Suzanne Spiteri	48.05	
3rd place, bronze medalist(s)	Iceland	Vilborg Jóhannsdóttir, Sigurbjörg Ólafsdóttir, Silja Úlfarsdóttir, Sunna Gestsdóttir	50.28	

=== 4 x 400 metres relay ===
June 7

Rank	Nation	Competitors	Time	Notes
1st place, gold medalist(s)	Cyprus	Anne Christofidou, Gavriela Sofokleous, Theodora Kyriacou, Alissa Kallinikou	3:44.48	GR
2nd place, silver medalist(s)	Malta	Charlene Attard, Suzanne Spiteri, Celine Pace, Tanya Blake	3:45.69	NR
3rd place, bronze medalist(s)	Iceland	Sigurbjörg Ólafsdóttir, Vilborg Jóhannsdóttir, Sunna Gestsdóttir, Silja Úlfarsdóttir	3:53.19	
4	Monaco	Pauline Maes, Lucille Maes, Caroline Mangion, Irène Tiéndrebeogo	3:57.20	

=== Long jump ===
June 7

Rank	Name	Nationality	Result	Notes
1st place, gold medalist(s)	Irene Charalambous	Cyprus	6.38	GR
2nd place, silver medalist(s)	Sunna Gestsdóttir	Iceland	6.30	NR
3rd place, bronze medalist(s)	Rebecca Camilleri	Malta	5.86	
4	Sigurbjörg Ólafsdóttir	Iceland	5.78	
5	Evangelia Louca	Cyprus	5.59	
6	Montserrat Pujol	Andorra	5.48	
7	Lara Gerada	Malta	5.38	
8	Vicky Barbera	Andorra	5.20	

=== Triple jump ===
June 5

Rank	Name	Nationality	Result	Notes
1st place, gold medalist(s)	Maria Diikiti	Cyprus	12.89	GR
2nd place, silver medalist(s)	Thomaida Polidorou	Cyprus	12.22	
3rd place, bronze medalist(s)	Lara Gerada	Malta	11.90	
4	Rakel Tryggvadóttir	Iceland	11.82	
5	Montserrat Pujol	Andorra	11.72	
6	Lucia Gualandra	San Marino	11.50	
7	Laura Rossell	Andorra	11.04	
	Rebecca Camilleri	Malta	DQ	

=== Discus throw ===
June 3

Rank	Name	Nationality	Result	Notes
1st place, gold medalist(s)	Alexandra Klatsia	Cyprus	41.38	
2nd place, silver medalist(s)	Ásdís Hjálmsdóttir	Iceland	40.94	
3rd place, bronze medalist(s)	Halla Hemisdóttir	Iceland	40.23	
4	Jennifer Pace Hickey	Malta	31.42	
5	Antonella Cachia	Malta	28.78	
6	Elena Villalón	Andorra	25.20	

=== Javelin throw ===
June 5

Rank	Name	Nationality	Result	Notes
1st place, gold medalist(s)	Sigrún Fjeldstedottir	Iceland	47.80	
2nd place, silver medalist(s)	Vigdís Guðjónsdóttir	Iceland	47.36	
3rd place, bronze medalist(s)	Carla Lella	Cyprus	45.90	
4	Johanna Heeb	Liechtenstein	43.58	
5	Eleni Mavroudi	Cyprus	38.21	
6	Jennifer Pace Hickey	Malta	36.53	NR

== Medal table ==
Rank	Nation	Gold	Silver	Bronze	Total
1	Cyprus	18	11	7	36
2	Iceland	4	6	7	17
3	Malta	4	6	6	16
4	Luxembourg	1	3	1	5
5	Andorra	1	2	4	7
6	Monaco	1	0	1	2
7	San Marino	0	1	3	4
8	Liechtenstein	0	0	0	0
Totals (8 entries)		29	29	29	87

== Participating nations ==
- Andorra (14)
- Cyprus (43)
- Iceland (20)
- Liechtenstein (4)
- Luxembourg (13)
- Malta (29) (Host team)
- Monaco (18)
- San Marino (9)
