= Athletics at the 2001 Games of the Small States of Europe =

- Dates: 30 May – 2 June
- Host city: San Marino
- Events: 31
- Participation: 8 nations

Athletics at the 2001 Games of the Small States of Europe were held in San Marino on 30 May, 1 and 2 June.

== Medal summary ==
=== Men ===
Event	Gold		Silver		Bronze	
100 metres	Anninos Marcoullides (CYP)	10.23	Rachid Chouhal (MLT)	10.59	Gian Nicola Berardi (SMR)	10.62
200 metres	Anninos Marcoullides (CYP)	20.91	Mario Bonello (MLT)	21.42	Rachid Chouhal (MLT)	21.63
400 metres	Salvador Lopes Goncalves (LUX)	48.43	Modestos Hadjisolomis (CYP)	49.11	Daniel Gómez (AND)	49.84
800 metres	Víctor Martínez (AND)	1:51.22	David Fiegen (LUX)	1:51.54	Brice Etès (MON)	1:53.66
1500 metres	Víctor Martínez (AND)	3:53.51	Sveinn Margeirsson (ISL)	3:55.24	Christian Thielen (LUX)	3:56.50
5000 metres	Stathis Stasi (CYP)	14:37.68	Toni Bernadó (AND)	14:41.87	Manel Fernandes (AND)	14:50.62
10,000 metres	Manel Fernandes (AND)	32:01.84	Toni Bernadó (AND)	32:01.90	John Buhagiar (MLT)	32:46.17
110 metres hurdles	Jón Arnar Magnússon (ISL)	14.43	Kyriacos Kyriacou (CYP)	14.77	Sébastien Rousset (MON)	15.23
400 metres hurdles	Costas Pochanis (CYP)	51.4	Panayiotis Raptis (CYP)	52.6	Daniel Gómez (AND)	52.8
3000 metres steeplechase	Stathis Stasi (CYP)	8:54.26 GR	Josep Sansa (AND)	9:07.25	Pere Cornellá (AND)	9:11.87
4×100 metres relay	Cyprus ? ? Kyriacos Kyriacou; Anninos Markoullides	40.98	Malta; Mario Bonello ? ? Rachid Chouhal	41.13	Iceland	43.10
4×400 metres relay	Cyprus ? ? ? Modestos Hadjisolomis	3:17.34	Luxembourg; Jean-Claude Boreiko; David Fiegen; Carlos Calvo; Salvador Lopes Gonçalves	3:18.86	Malta	3:20.98
High jump	Einar Karl Hjartarson (ISL)	2.25	Neofytos Kalogerou (CYP)	2.09	Marios Iacovou (CYP)	2.06
Long jump	Jón Arnar Magnússon (ISL)	7.41	Cosmas Theodorou (CYP)	6.95	Stelios Petrou (CYP)	6.83
Triple jump	Stelios Kapsalis (CYP)	15.59	Stelios Petrou (CYP)	15.31	Sigtryggur Aðalbjörnsson (ISL)	14.25
Shot put	Jón Arnar Magnússon (ISL)	15.71	Georgios Arestis (CYP)	15.71	Stefan Kaufmann (LIE)	13.75
Discus throw	Georgios Arestis (CYP)	48.46	Ángel Moreno (AND)	46.97	Jón Arnar Magnússon (ISL)	46.40
Javelin throw	Gabriele Mazza (SMR)	69.90	Panos Kalogerou (CYP)	66.07	Antoine Collette (LUX)	63.14

=== Women ===
Event	Gold		Silver		Bronze	
100 metres	Silja Úlfarsdóttir (ISL)	11.97	Sunna Gestsdóttir (ISL)	12.12	Thessalia Othonos (CYP)	12.16
200 metres	Silja Úlfarsdóttir (ISL)	24.34	Sunna Gestsdóttir (ISL)	24.47	Deirdre Farrugia (MLT)	24.80
400 metres	Androulla Sialou (CYP)	55.11	Silja Úlfarsdóttir (ISL)	55.16	Alissa Kallinikou (CYP)	56.31
800 metres	Tanya Blake (MLT)	2:06.26	Christa Salt (LUX)	2:10.16	Nobili Martine (LUX)	2:11.79
1500 metres	Elisa Vagnini (SMR)	4:29.77	Christa Salt (LUX)	4:33.50	Denise Vorburger (LIE)	4:52.65
5000 metres	Elisa Vagnini (SMR)	16:59.57	Carol Galea (MLT)	17:07.30	Irina Kazakova (MON)	17:16.05
10,000 metres	Irina Kazakova (MON)	34:41.33 GR	Carol Galea (MLT)	34:55.78	Charmaine Sciberras (MLT)	37:48.58
4×100 metres relay	Malta ? ? Deirdre Farrugia; Suzanne Spiteri	48.42	San Marino; Manuela Albani; Elisa Conti; Lucia Gualandra; Sara Moroncelli	51.91	Only two finishers	
4×400 metres relay	Cyprus ? Vaso Papaioannou; Alissa Kallinikou; Androula Sialou	3:45.34 GR	Malta ? ? Celina Pace; Tanya Blake	3:52.24	Monaco	4:01.93
High jump	Ioulia Farmaka (CYP)	1.85	Margarita Proestou (CYP)	1.70	Laurence Baum (LUX)	1.65
Long jump	Irini Charalambous (CYP)	6.08	Montserrat Pujol (AND)	5.65 (w)	Lara Gerada (MLT)	5.53
Triple jump	Montserrat Pujol (AND)	11.57	Lara Gerada (MLT)	11.53 (w)	Lucia Gualandra (SMR)	11.46
Javelin throw	Vigdís Guðjónsdóttir (ISL)	53.43	Johanna Heeb (LIE)	41.81	Only two competitors	

== Men's results ==
=== 100 metres ===
Heats – 30 May
Wind:
Heat 1: +1.2 m/s, Heat 2: +1.9 m/s

Rank	Heat	Name	Nationality	Time	Notes
1	1	Anninos Marcoullides	Cyprus	10.33	Q
3	1	Mario Bonello	Malta	10.84	Q
1	2	Themis Rotos	Cyprus	10.60	Q
2	2	Rachid Chouhal	Malta	10.62	Q
3	2	Gian Nicola Berardi	San Marino	10.81	Q
4	2	Michel Arlanda	Monaco	10.89	q

Final – May 30
Wind:
+1.6 m/s

Rank	Name	Nationality	Time	Notes
1st place, gold medalist(s)	Anninos Marcoullides	Cyprus	10.23	GR
2nd place, silver medalist(s)	Rachid Chouhal	Malta	10.59	NR
3rd place, bronze medalist(s)	Gian Nicola Berardi	San Marino	10.62	NR
4	Reynir Logi Ólafsson	Iceland	10.63	
5	Mario Bonello	Malta	10.74	SB
6	Michel Arlanda	Monaco	10.83	PB
7	Sveinn Þórarinsson	Iceland	11.06	
8	Themis Rotos	Cyprus	12.54	

=== 200 metres ===
June 2
Wind: +2.9 m/s

Rank	Name	Nationality	Time	Notes
1st place, gold medalist(s)	Anninos Marcoullides	Cyprus	20.91	
2nd place, silver medalist(s)	Mario Bonello	Malta	21.42	
3rd place, bronze medalist(s)	Rachid Chouhal	Malta	21.63	
4	Neofytos Kyriakou	Cyprus	21.88	
5	Sveinn Þórarinsson	Iceland	22.16	
6	François Boffa	Monaco	22.23	
	Reynir Logi Ólafsson	Iceland	?	
	Michel Arlanda	Monaco	?	

=== 400 metres ===
June 1

Rank	Name	Nationality	Time	Notes
1st place, gold medalist(s)	Salvador Lopes Goncalves	Luxembourg	48.43	
2nd place, silver medalist(s)	Modestos Hadjisolomis	Cyprus	49.11	
3rd place, bronze medalist(s)	Daniel Gómez	Andorra	49.84	SB
4	Medhi Kheddar	Monaco	50.12	
5	Georgios Christoforou	Cyprus	50.27	
6	Karl Farrugia	Malta	50.67	
7	Abdu Bahmadi	Monaco	51.34	
8	Mark Herrera	Malta	53.37	

=== 800 metres ===
June 1

Rank	Name	Nationality	Time	Notes
1st place, gold medalist(s)	Víctor Martínez	Andorra	1:51.22	SB
2nd place, silver medalist(s)	David Fiegen	Luxembourg	1:51.54	SB
3rd place, bronze medalist(s)	Brice Etès	Monaco	1:53.66	PB
4	Giannakis Kleanthous	Cyprus	1:54.01	SB
5	Fabio Spiteri	Malta	1:54.14	SB
6	Sigurbjörn Árni Arngrímsson	Iceland	1:54.82	
7	Sveinn Margeirsson	Iceland	1:55.32	
8	Carlos Calvo	Luxembourg	1:55.55	
9	Florian Hilti	Liechtenstein	1:56.16	
10	Georgios Raftopoulos	Cyprus	1:56.24	
11	Mark Herrera	Malta	2:02.45	

=== 1500 metres ===
June 2

Rank	Name	Nationality	Time	Notes
1st place, gold medalist(s)	Víctor Martínez	Andorra	3:53.51	PB
2nd place, silver medalist(s)	Sveinn Margeirsson	Iceland	3:55.24	
3rd place, bronze medalist(s)	Christian Thielen	Luxembourg	3:56.50	
4	Alexander Busuttil	Malta	3:57.14	PB
5	Giannakis Kleanthous	Cyprus	3:57.34	
6	Sigurbjörn Árni Arngrímsson	Iceland	4:11.93	
	Djamal Baaziz	Monaco	DNS	
	Jean-Marc Leandro	Monaco	DNS	

=== 5000 metres ===
June 1

Rank	Name	Nationality	Time	Notes
1st place, gold medalist(s)	Stathis Stasi	Cyprus	14:37.68	
2nd place, silver medalist(s)	Toni Bernadó	Andorra	14:41.87	
3rd place, bronze medalist(s)	Manel Fernandes	Andorra	14:50.62	
4	Vincent Nothum	Luxembourg	15:09.90	
5	John Buhagiar	Malta	15:10.02	
6	Robert Attard	Malta	15:41.75	
	Jean-Marc Leandro	Monaco	?	

=== 10,000 metres ===
May 30

Rank	Name	Nationality	Time	Notes
1st place, gold medalist(s)	Manel Fernandes	Andorra	32:01.84	
2nd place, silver medalist(s)	Toni Bernadó	Andorra	32:01.90	
3rd place, bronze medalist(s)	John Buhagiar	Malta	32:46.17	
	Robert Attard	Malta	DNS	

=== 110 metres hurdles ===
June 1
Wind: +0.8 m/s

Rank	Name	Nationality	Time	Notes
1st place, gold medalist(s)	Jón Arnar Magnússon	Iceland	14.43	SB
2nd place, silver medalist(s)	Kyriacos Kyriacou	Cyprus	14.77	
3rd place, bronze medalist(s)	Sébastien Rousset	Monaco	15.23	
4	Ingi Sturla Þórisson	Iceland	15.32	
5	Sergi Raya	Andorra	15.76	

=== 400 metres hurdles ===
June 1

Rank	Name	Nationality	Time	Notes
1st place, gold medalist(s)	Costas Pochanis	Cyprus	51.4	
2nd place, silver medalist(s)	Panayiotis Raptis	Cyprus	52.6	
3rd place, bronze medalist(s)	Daniel Gómez	Andorra	52.8	
4	Sveinn Þórarinsson	Iceland	53.5	
5	Anthony Jarrier-Martin	Monaco	58.2	

=== 3000 metres steeplechase ===
May 30

Rank	Name	Nationality	Time	Notes
1st place, gold medalist(s)	Stathis Stasi	Cyprus	8:54.26	GR
2nd place, silver medalist(s)	Josep Sansa	Andorra	9:07.25	SB
3rd place, bronze medalist(s)	Pere Cornellá	Andorra	9:11.87	
4	Djamal Baaziz	Monaco	9:43.22	PB

=== 4 x 100 metres relay ===
June 2

Rank	Nation	Competitors	Time	Notes
1st place, gold medalist(s)	Cyprus	?, ?, Kyriacos Kyriacou, Anninos Markoullides	40.98	
2nd place, silver medalist(s)	Malta	Mario Bonello, ?, ?, Rachid Chouhal	41.13	NR
3rd place, bronze medalist(s)	Iceland		43.10	
	San Marino	Gian Nicola Berardi, Federico Gorrieri, Fabrizio Righi, Matteo Righi	DQ	

=== 4 x 400 metres relay ===
June 2

Rank	Nation	Competitors	Time	Notes
1st place, gold medalist(s)	Cyprus	?, ?, ?, Modestos Hadjisolomis	3:17.34	
2nd place, silver medalist(s)	Luxembourg	Jean-Claude Boreiko, David Fiegen, Carlos Calvo, Salvador Lopes Gonçalves	3:18.86	
3rd place, bronze medalist(s)	Malta		3:20.98	
4	Monaco		3:23.20	

=== High jump ===
June 2

Rank	Name	Nationality	Result	Notes
1st place, gold medalist(s)	Einar Karl Hjartarson	Iceland	2.25	GR
2nd place, silver medalist(s)	Neofytos Kalogerou	Cyprus	2.09	
3rd place, bronze medalist(s)	Marios Iacovou	Cyprus	2.06	PB
4	Christian Gloor	Liechtenstein	2.00	

=== Long jump ===
June 1

Rank	Name	Nationality	Result	Notes
1st place, gold medalist(s)	Jón Arnar Magnússon	Iceland	7.41	
2nd place, silver medalist(s)	Cosmas Theodorou	Cyprus	6.95	
3rd place, bronze medalist(s)	Stelios Petrou	Cyprus	6.83	
4	Christian Gloor	Liechtenstein	6.76	
5	Sigtryggur Aðalbjörnsson	Iceland	6.61	
6	Jeff Steffen	Luxembourg	6.58	
7	Federico Gorrieri	San Marino	6.29	
	Luca Maccapani	San Marino	?	

=== Triple jump ===
May 30

Rank	Name	Nationality	Result	Notes
1st place, gold medalist(s)	Stelios Kapsalis	Cyprus	15.59	
2nd place, silver medalist(s)	Stelios Petrou	Cyprus	15.31	SB
3rd place, bronze medalist(s)	Sigtryggur Aðalbjörnsson	Iceland	14.25	
4	Xavier Montaner	Andorra	14.25	SB

=== Shot put ===
May 30

Rank	Name	Nationality	Result	Notes
1st place, gold medalist(s)	Jón Arnar Magnússon	Iceland	15.71	
2nd place, silver medalist(s)	Georgios Arestis	Cyprus	15.71	
3rd place, bronze medalist(s)	Stefan Kaufmann	Liechtenstein	13.75	
4	Ángel Moreno	Andorra	13.22	

=== Discus throw ===
May 30

Rank	Name	Nationality	Result	Notes
1st place, gold medalist(s)	Georgios Arestis	Cyprus	48.46	
2nd place, silver medalist(s)	Ángel Moreno	Andorra	46.97	
3rd place, bronze medalist(s)	Jón Arnar Magnússon	Iceland	46.40	
4	Stefan Kaufmann	Liechtenstein	35.70	

=== Javelin throw ===
June 1

Rank	Name	Nationality	Result	Notes
1st place, gold medalist(s)	Gabriele Mazza	San Marino	69.90	NR
2nd place, silver medalist(s)	Panos Kalogerou	Cyprus	66.07	
3rd place, bronze medalist(s)	Antoine Collette	Luxembourg	63.14	
4	Adriá Pérez	Andorra	58.00	

== Women's results ==
=== 100 metres ===
Heats – 30 May
Wind:
Heat 1: +1.2 m/s, Heat 2: +1.2 m/s

Rank	Heat	Name	Nationality	Time	Notes
1	1	Silja Úlfarsdóttir	Iceland	12.12	Q
2	1	Sandra Frisch	Luxembourg	12.35	Q
1	2	Sunna Gestsdóttir	Iceland	12.13	Q
2	2	Deirdre Farrugia	Malta	12.27	Q
3	2	Thessalia Othonos	Cyprus	12.28	Q

Final – May 30
Wind:
+1.8 m/s

Rank	Name	Nationality	Time	Notes
1st place, gold medalist(s)	Silja Úlfarsdóttir	Iceland	11.97	SB
2nd place, silver medalist(s)	Sunna Gestsdóttir	Iceland	12.12	SB
3rd place, bronze medalist(s)	Thessalia Othonos	Cyprus	12.16	PB
4	Deirdre Farrugia	Malta	12.16	PB
5	Sandra Frisch	Luxembourg	12.24	SB
6	Vaso Papaioannou	Cyprus	12.43	
7	Sue Spiteri	Malta	12.48	SB
8	Chantal Hayen	Luxembourg	12.74	

=== 200 metres ===
June 2
Wind: +2.5 m/s

Rank	Name	Nationality	Time	Notes
1st place, gold medalist(s)	Silja Úlfarsdóttir	Iceland	24.34	
2nd place, silver medalist(s)	Sunna Gestsdóttir	Iceland	24.47	
3rd place, bronze medalist(s)	Deirdre Farrugia	Malta	24.80	
4	Vaso Papaioannou	Cyprus	??.??	
5	Sandra Frisch	Luxembourg	25.32	
6	Irène Tiéndrebeogo	Monaco	25.40	
7	Sue Spiteri	Malta	25.43	
8	Lucile Maes	Monaco	27.26	

=== 400 metres ===
June 1

Rank	Name	Nationality	Time	Notes
1st place, gold medalist(s)	Androulla Sialou	Cyprus	55.11	PB
2nd place, silver medalist(s)	Silja Úlfarsdóttir	Iceland	55.16	SB
3rd place, bronze medalist(s)	Alissa Kallinicou	Cyprus	56.31	SB
4	Christa Salt	Luxembourg	58.47	
5	Céline Pace	Malta	1:00.12	PB
6	Carmen Domenjó	Andorra	1:01.47	
	Tanya Blake	Malta	DNS	

=== 800 metres ===
June 1

Rank	Name	Nationality	Time	Notes
1st place, gold medalist(s)	Tanya Blake	Malta	2:06.26	GR
2nd place, silver medalist(s)	Christa Salt	Luxembourg	2:10.16	
3rd place, bronze medalist(s)	Martine Nobili	Luxembourg	2:11.79	PB
4	Stefani Sofokleous	Cyprus	2:16.25	PB
5	Marie-Laure Demange	Monaco	2:18.49	PB
6	Caroline Mangion	Monaco	2:21.49	
7	Tina Thierstein	Liechtenstein	2:24.03	
	Elisa Vagnini	San Marino	DNS	

=== 1500 metres ===
June 2

Rank	Name	Nationality	Time	Notes
1st place, gold medalist(s)	Elisa Vagnini	San Marino	4:29.77	
2nd place, silver medalist(s)	Christa Salt	Luxembourg	4:33.50	
3rd place, bronze medalist(s)	Denise Vorburger	Liechtenstein	4:52.65	
4	Eva Iglesias	Andorra	4:53.53	
	Marie-Laure Demange	Monaco	DNS	
	Carol Galea	Malta	DNS	
	Tanya Blake	Malta	DNS	

=== 5000 metres ===
May 30

Rank	Name	Nationality	Time	Notes
1st place, gold medalist(s)	Elisa Vagnini	San Marino	16:59.57	
2nd place, silver medalist(s)	Carol Galea	Malta	17:07.30	PB
3rd place, bronze medalist(s)	Irina Kazakova	Monaco	17:16.05	SB
4	Charmaine Sciberras	Malta	17:46.40	
5	Pascale Schmoetten	Luxembourg	17:54.23	
6	Eva Iglesias	Andorra	19:23.18	

=== 10,000 metres ===
June 1

Rank	Name	Nationality	Time	Notes
1st place, gold medalist(s)	Irina Kazakova	Monaco	34:41.33	GR
2nd place, silver medalist(s)	Carol Galea	Malta	34:55.78	
3rd place, bronze medalist(s)	Charmaine Sciberras	Malta	37:48.58	

=== 4 x 100 metres relay ===
June 2

Rank	Nation	Competitors	Time	Notes
1st place, gold medalist(s)	Malta	?, ?, Deirdre Farrugia, Suzanne Spiteri	48.42	
2nd place, silver medalist(s)	San Marino	Manuela Albani, Elisa Conti, Lucia Gualandra, Sara Moroncelli	51.91	
	Andorra		DNS	
	Cyprus		DNS	

=== 4 x 400 metres relay ===
June 2

Rank	Nation	Competitors	Time	Notes
1st place, gold medalist(s)	Cyprus	?, Vaso Papaioannou, Alissa Kallinikou, Androula Sialou	3:45.34	
2nd place, silver medalist(s)	Malta	?, ?, Celina Pace, Tanya Blake	3:52.24	
3rd place, bronze medalist(s)	Monaco		4:01.93	

=== High jump ===
May 30

Rank	Name	Nationality	Result	Notes
1st place, gold medalist(s)	Ioulia Farmaka	Cyprus	1.85	PB
2nd place, silver medalist(s)	Margarita Proestou	Cyprus	1.70	
3rd place, bronze medalist(s)	Laurence Baum	Luxembourg	1.65	
4	Steffi Baldelli	Luxembourg	1.60	
5	Nerea Coto	Andorra	1.55	

=== Long jump ===
June 2

Rank	Name	Nationality	Result	Notes
1st place, gold medalist(s)	Irene Charalambous	Cyprus	6.08	
2nd place, silver medalist(s)	Montserrat Pujol	Andorra	5.65 (w)	
3rd place, bronze medalist(s)	Lara Gerada	Malta	5.53	
4	Monica Pierini	San Marino	5.46 (w)	
5	Olivia Giesecke	Monaco	4.98	
	Victória Barberá	Andorra	DNS	

=== Triple jump ===
June 1

Rank	Name	Nationality	Result	Notes
1st place, gold medalist(s)	Montserrat Pujol	Andorra	11.57	SB
2nd place, silver medalist(s)	Lara Gerada	Malta	11.53 (w)	
3rd place, bronze medalist(s)	Lucia Gualandra	San Marino	11.46	NR
4	Victória Barberá	Andorra	10.99 (w)	

=== Javelin throw ===
June 2

Rank	Name	Nationality	Result	Notes
1st place, gold medalist(s)	Vigdís Guðjónsdóttir	Iceland	53.43	
2nd place, silver medalist(s)	Johanna Heeb	Liechtenstein	41.81	

== Medal table ==
Rank	Nation	Gold	Silver	Bronze	Total
1	Cyprus	13	9	4	26
2	Iceland	7	4	3	14
3	Andorra	4	5	4	13
4	San Marino	3	1	2	6
5	Malta	2	7	6	15
6	Luxembourg	1	4	4	9
7	Monaco	1	0	4	5
8	Liechtenstein	0	1	2	3
Totals (8 entries)		31	31	29	91
