= Athletics at the 1993 Games of the Small States of Europe =

- Dates: 25–29 May
- Host city: Valletta, Malta
- Events: 31
- Participation: 8 nations

Athletics at the 1993 Games of the Small States of Europe were held in Valletta, Malta between 25 and 29 May.

== Medal summary ==
=== Men ===
Event	Gold		Silver		Bronze	
100 metres (wind: +0.4 m/s)	Anninos Markoullides (CYP)	10.66	Einar Þor Einarsson (ISL)	10.72	Serge Müller (LUX)	11.09
200 metres (wind: -0.6 m/s)	Anninos Markoullides (CYP)	21.28	Einar Þor Einarsson (ISL)	21.87	Evripides Demosthenous (CYP)	22.26
400 metres	Evripides Demosthenous (CYP)	48.48	Konstantinos Pochanis (CYP)	48.81	Manlio Molinari (SMR)	48.99
800 metres	Yannakis Kleanthous (CYP)	1:51.83	Manlio Molinari (SMR)	1:52.08	Carlos Calvo (LUX)	1:52.57
1500 metres	Andreas Christodoulou (CYP)	3:48.18 CR	Georgios Loukaidis (CYP)	3:50.10	Claude Assel (LUX)	3:50.73
5000 metres	Georgios Loukaidis (CYP)	14:28.11 CR	Manel Fernandes (AND)	?	Lahcen Essoussi (MON)	15:16.14
10,000 metres	Lahcen Essoussi (MON)	31:18.20	Manel Fernandes (AND)	31:28.90	Stelios Marneros (CYP)	32:09.45
110 metres hurdles (wind: NWI)	Prodromos Katsantonis (CYP)	14.41	Thierry Eischen (LUX)	15.00		15.25
4×100 metres relay	Cyprus ? ? Evripides Demosthenous; Anninos Markoullides	41.28	San Marino; Nicola Selva; Manlio Molinari; Aldo Canti; Dominique Canti	?	Malta; David Mifsud; Robert Chircop; Kevin Tonna; Mario Bonello	?
4×400 metres relay	Cyprus; Kostas Pochanis ? ? Evripides Demosthenous	3:16.62 CR	Monaco; Abdou Bahmadi; Frédéric Choquard; Christophe Mendes; Jean-Camille Oyac	3:25.97	Malta; Mark Sullivan; Tony Sammut; Mario Bonello; Xandru Grech	?
High jump	Neophytos Kalogerou (CYP)	2.16 CR	Jean-Claude Husting (LUX)	2.13	Einar Kristjánsson (ISL)	2.07
Pole vault	Fotis Stefani (CYP)	5.00 CR	Sigurður Sigurðsson (ISL)	4.80	A. Ioannou (CYP)	4.60
Long jump	Hristaris Kleanthous (CYP)	7.05	Bernard Felten (LUX)	7.05	Jón Oddsson (ISL)	6.89 (w)
Triple jump	Marios Hadjiandreou (CYP)	15.65	Ioannis Papadopoulos (CYP)	15.11	Xavi Montane (AND)	15.06
Shot put	Pétur Guðmundsson (ISL)	19.60 CR	Elias Louka (CYP)	18.10	Michalis Louka (CYP)	16.67
Discus throw	Eggert Bogason (ISL)	53.54	Carlo Bartolucci (LUX)	51.18	Lambros Iakovou (CYP)	48.24
Hammer throw	Guðmundur Karlsson (ISL)	63.80 CR	Eggert Bogason (ISL)	54.82	Georgios Theodoros (CYP)	52.26
Javelin throw	Sigurður Einarsson (ISL)	74.74	Einar Vilhjálmsson (ISL)	71.10	Adamos Christodoulou (CYP)	66.90

=== Women ===
Event	Gold		Silver		Bronze	
100 metres (wind: +0.1 m/s)	Manuela Marxer (LIE)	12.21	Geirlaug Geirlaugsdóttir (ISL)	12.24	Véronique Linster (LUX)	12.25
200 metres (wind: -0.6 m/s)	Dora Kyriakou (CYP)	24.47 CR	Deirdre Caruana (MLT)	25.27	Yvonne Hasler (LIE)	25.51
400 metres	Dora Kyriakou (CYP)	54.55 CR	Androula Sialou (CYP)	56.82	Sandra Felten (LUX)	57.05
800 metres	Frida Rún Þórðardóttir (ISL)	2:12.21	Tania Fransissi (LUX)	2:13.66		2:15.16
1500 metres	Frida Rún Þórðardóttir (ISL)	4:30.81	Diane Nauzin (MON)	4:35.06	Carol Galea (MLT)	4:38.69
3000 metres	Frida Rún Þórðardóttir (ISL)	9:31.00	Diane Nauzin (MON)	9:36.06	Martha Ernstdóttir (ISL)	9:45.14
100 metres hurdles (NWI)	Manuela Marxer (LIE)	13.94 CR	Olympiada Menelaou (CYP)	14.42	Véronique Linster (LUX)	14.42
4×100 metres relay	Cyprus	47.55	?	?	Andorra	48.54
4×400 metres relay	Cyprus ? ? Androula Sialou; Dora Kyriakou	3:52.62	Monaco; Sonia Del Prete; Magali Guedon; Leclercq; Caroline Porfirio	3:59.99	Iceland; Geirlaug Geirlaugsdóttir; Frida Þórðardóttir; Svanhildur Kristjónsdóttir; Margret Brynjolfsdóttir	4:00.23
High jump	Disa Gísladóttir (ISL)	1.80	Agni Haralambous (CYP)	1.77	Margarida Moreno (AND)	1.74
Long jump	Sonia Del Prete (MON)	6.11	Manuela Marxer (LIE)	5.93	Stella Theocharous (CYP)	5.49
Shot put	Elli Evangelidou (CYP)	15.13 CR	Guðbjörg Gylfadóttir (ISL)	13.79	Manuela Marxer (LIE)	12.41
Javelin throw	Vigdís Guðjónsdóttir (ISL)	48.02	Eleni Teloni (CYP)	43.62	Jennifer Pace (MLT)	43.08

== Medal table ==
Rank	Nation	Gold	Silver	Bronze	Total
1	Cyprus	18	8	8	34
2	Iceland	9	7	4	20
3	Monaco	2	4	1	7
4	Liechtenstein	2	1	2	5
5	Luxembourg	0	5	6	11
6	Andorra	0	2	3	5
7	San Marino	0	2	1	3
8	Malta	0	1	4	5
Totals (8 entries)		31	30	29	90
