= Athletics at the 1999 Games of the Small States of Europe =

- Dates: 24–29 May
- Host city: Schaan, Liechtenstein
- Events: 25
- Participation: 8 nations

Athletics at the 1999 Games of the Small States of Europe were held in Schaan, Liechtenstein between 24 and 29 May.

== Medal summary ==
=== Men ===
Event	Gold		Silver		Bronze	
100 metres (wind: +0.5 m/s)	Anninos Marcoullides (CYP)	10.61	Jóhannes Marteinsson (ISL)	10.85	Reynir Logi Ólafsson (ISL)	10.86
200 metres (wind: +1.0 m/s)	Prodromos Katsantonis (CYP)	20.83 CR	Bjarni Traustason (ISL)	21.55	Mario Bonello (MLT)	21.62
400 metres	Marc Reuter (LUX)	48.10	Daniel Gómez (AND)	48.38	Antonis Agiomamites (CYP)	48.83
800 metres	Víctor Martínez (AND)	1:49.94 CR	Jean-Marc Leandro (MON)	1:51.05	Carlos Calvo (LUX)	1:51.34
1500 metres	Víctor Martínez (AND)	3:49.02	Jean-Marc Leandro (MON)	3:51.53	Xandru Grech (MLT)	3:56.34
5000 metres	Manel Fernandes (AND)	14:47.72	Joan Ramon Moya (AND)	14:47.95	Mustapha Tantan (MON)	14:58.10
10,000 metres	Toni Bernadó (AND)	30:52.13	Manel Fernandes (AND)	30:52.15	Kevin Zammit (MLT)	30:59.06
110 metres hurdles (wind: +1.8 m/s)	Kyriacos Kyriacou (CYP)	14.24	Jón Arnar Magnússon (ISL)	14.44	Esteve Martín (AND)	14.47
400 metres hurdles	Costas Pochanis (CYP)	50.28 CR	Daniel Gómez (AND)	51.83	Panayiotis Raptis (CYP)	52.75
4×100 metres relay	Iceland; Unnsteinn Grétarsson; Bjarni Traustason; Reynir Logi Ólafsson; Jóhannes Marteinsson	41.48	Luxembourg; Berni Philippart; Marc Reuter; Bernard Felten; Pascal Berchem	41.91	San Marino; Pietro Faetanini; Manlio Molinari; Cristian Forcellini; Fabrizio Righi	42.84
4×400 metres relay	Luxembourg; Paul Zens; Claude Godart; Pascal Berchem; Carlos Calvo	3:19.29	Monaco; Abdou Bahmadi; Mehdi Kheddar; Stephane Reggiani; Christophe Mendes	3:20.14	Malta; Lawrence Micallef; Fabio Spiteri; Mario Bonello; Rachid Chouhal	3:20.40
High jump	Einar Karl Hjartarson (ISL)	2.12	Esteve Martín (AND)	2.06	Ioannis Constantinou (CYP)	2.03
Long jump	Jón Arnar Magnússon (ISL)	7.64 CR	Esteve Martín (AND)	7.53	Bernard Felten (LUX)	7.44
Shot put	Lambros Iakovou (CYP)	16.59	Jón Arnar Magnússon (ISL)	15.70	Magnús Aron Hallgrímsson (ISL)	15.62
Discus throw	Magnús Aron Hallgrímsson (ISL)	58.28	Lambros Iakovou (CYP)	51.67	Demetris Toumbas (CYP)	48.86
Javelin throw	Antoine Collette (LUX)	69.67	Jón Ásgrímsson (ISL)	67.91	Pieros Tsitsios (CYP)	67.33

=== Women ===
Event	Gold		Silver		Bronze	
100 metres (wind: +2.3 m/s)	Silja Úlfarsdóttir (ISL)	12.09	Deirdre Caruana (MLT)	12.29	Guðný Eyþórsdóttir (ISL)	12.37
200 metres (wind: +2.1 m/s)	Silja Úlfarsdóttir (ISL)	24.26	Deirdre Caruana (MLT)	24.96	Alissa Kallinikou (CYP)	25.07
400 metres	Silja Úlfarsdóttir (ISL)	54.97	Christa Salt (LUX)	57.07	Yvonne Hasler (LIE)	57.37
800 metres	Christa Salt (LUX)	2:06.90 CR	Elisa Vagnini (SMR)	2:08.66 NR	Birna Björnsdóttir (ISL)	2:08.70
1500 metres	Elisa Vagnini (SMR)	4:22.81 CR	Christa Salt (LUX)	4:23.92	María Betriu (AND)	4:27.71
5000 metres	Hafida Gadi-Richard (MON)	16:41.82	Martha Ernstdóttir (ISL)	16:49.91	María Betriu (AND)	17:04.96
High jump	Irène Tiendrébéogo (MON)	1.86 =CR	Ioulia Farmaka (CYP)	1.80	Disa Gísladóttir (ISL)	1.75
Long jump	Claudia Czerwonka (LUX)	5.88	Vicky Barbera (AND)	5.58	Montserrat Pujol (AND)	5.52
Triple jump	Claudia Czerwonka (LUX)	12.43 CR, NR	Ioanna Lazarou (CYP)	12.38	Lara Gerada (MLT)	11.24

== Medal table ==
Rank	Nation	Gold	Silver	Bronze	Total
1	Iceland	7	6	5	18
2	Luxembourg	6	3	2	11
3	Cyprus	5	3	6	14
4	Andorra	4	7	4	15
5	Monaco	2	3	1	6
6	San Marino	1	1	1	3
7	Malta	0	2	5	7
8	Liechtenstein	0	0	1	1
Totals (8 entries)		25	25	25	75
