= Athletics at the 1997 Games of the Small States of Europe =

- Dates: 2–7 June
- Host city: Reykjavík, Iceland
- Events: 31
- Participation: 8 nations

Athletics at the 1997 Games of the Small States of Europe were held in Reykjavík, Iceland between 2 and 7 June.

== Medal summary ==
=== Men ===
Event	Gold		Silver		Bronze	
100 metres (wind: +2.5 m/s)	Georgios Skender (CYP)	10.51	Jóhannes Marteinsson (ISL)	10.64	Martin Frick (LIE)	10.70
200 metres (wind: +7.8 m/s)	Martin Frick (LIE)	21.20	Mario Bonello (MLT)	21.38	Georgios Skender (CYP)	21.56
400 metres	Georgios Afamis (CYP)	50.44	Paul Zens (LUX)	51.12	Manlio Molinari (SMR)	51.17
800 metres	Yannakis Kleanthous (CYP)	1:57.04	Hristos Papapetrou (CYP)	1:57.27	Manlio Molinari (SMR)	1:57.88
1500 metres	Víctor Martínez (AND)	4:22.08	Hristos Papapetrou (CYP)	3:23.11	Jean-Marc Leandro (MON)	3:23.39
5000 metres	Georgios Loukaidis (CYP)	15:07.48	Joan Ramon Moya (AND)	15:09.56	Manel Fernandes (AND)	15:12.51
10,000 metres	Georgios Loukaidis (CYP)	30:35.06	Joan Ramon Moya (AND)	30:36.27	Manel Fernandes (AND)	30:46.68
110 metres hurdles (wind: +1.9 m/s)	Jón Arnar Magnússon (ISL)	13.91 CR	Thierry Eischen (LUX)	14.41	Ólafur Guðmundsson (ISL)	14.61
4×100 metres relay	Iceland; Jóhannes Marteinsson; Bjarni Traustason; Ólafur Guðmundsson; Jón Arnar Magnússon	42.06	Luxembourg; Christian Kemp; Marc Reuter; Bernard Felten; Thierry Eischen	43.00	Malta; Robert Chircop; Jason Muscat; Francis Harmsworth; Mario Bonello	43.42
4×400 metres relay	Luxembourg; Carlos Calvo; Christian Thielen; Marc Reuter; Paul Zens	3:28.52	Iceland; Sveinn Þórarinsson; Bjarni Traustason; Ólafur Guðmundsson; Ingi Hauksson	3:29.37	Monaco; Abdou Bahmadi; Stephane Reggiani; Djamal Hamoudi; Mehdi Kheddar	3:29.87
High jump	Raymond Conzemius (LUX)	2.18 CR	Neophytos Kalogerou (CYP)	2.09	Esteve Martín (AND)	2.03
Pole vault	Christos Adamides (CYP)	4.90	Bernard Felten (LUX)	4.80	Sigurður Sigurðsson (ISL)	4.40
Long jump	Renos Kolokotronis (CYP)	7.45w	Esteve Martín (AND)	7.31w	Bernard Felten (LUX)	7.26w
Triple jump	Ioannis Papadopoulos (CYP)	15.38w	Xavi Montane (AND)	15.09w	Sigtryggur Adalbjörnsson (ISL)	13.58w
Shot put	Pétur Guðmundsson (ISL)	19.12	Lambros Iakovou (CYP)	16.90	Marcel Weber (LUX)	15.69
Discus throw	Pétur Guðmundsson (ISL)	55.34	Lambros Iakovou (CYP)	49.86	Carlo Bartolucci (LUX)	46.84
Hammer throw	Jean-Charles de Ridder (LUX)	59.78	Bjarki Viðarsson (ISL)	59.58	Guðmundur Karlsson (ISL)	59.28
Javelin throw	Hristakis Telonis (CYP)	63.88	Sigmar Vilhjálmsson (ISL)	63.80	Antoine Collette (LUX)	61.36

=== Women ===
Event	Gold		Silver		Bronze	
100 metres (wind: -0.3 m/s)	Guðný Eyþórsdóttir (ISL)	12.15	Marilia Gregoriou (CYP)	12.30	Deirdre Caruana (MLT)	12.38
200 metres (wind: +4.8 m/s)	Guðrún Arnardóttir (ISL)	23.66	Sandra Felten (LUX)	24.74	Guðný Eyþórsdóttir (ISL)	24.82
400 metres	Guðrún Arnardóttir (ISL)	55.05	Helga Halldórsdóttir (ISL)	56.87	Sandra Felten (LIE)	57.25
800 metres	Christa Salt (LUX)	2:12.72	Birna Björnsdóttir (ISL)	2:13.59	Monica Randi (SMR)	2:16.97
1500 metres	Christa Salt (LUX)	4:48.54	Carol Galea (MLT)	4:49.83	Birna Björnsdóttir (ISL)	4:54.36
5000 metres	Carol Galea (MLT)	16:54.16	Hafida Gadi-Richard (MON)	17:12.37	Fríða Rún Þórðardóttir (ISL)	17:43.08
100 metres hurdles (wind: +3.0 m/s)	Guðrún Arnardóttir (ISL)	13.20	Marilia Gregoriou (CYP)	13.76	Helga Halldórsdóttir (ISL)	13.87
4×100 metres relay	Iceland; Silja Úlfarsdóttir; Helga Halldórsdóttir; Guðný Eyþórsdóttir; Guðrún Arnardóttir	48.03	Cyprus; Evi Symeou; Maria Demetriou; Elena Andreou; Marilia Gregoriou	49.64	Malta; Ruth Cortis; Rowena Spiteri; Deirdre Caruana; Suzanne Spiteri	49.79
High jump	Agni Haralambous (CYP)	1.74	Claudia Czerwonka (LUX)	1.71	Sonny Leches (LUX)	1.68
Long jump	Irini Haralambous (CYP)	6.00	Sigríður Guðjónsdóttir (ISL)	5.85w	Sandra Frisch (LUX)	5.77
Triple jump	Sigríður Guðjónsdóttir (ISL)	12.44w	Rakel Tryggvadóttir (ISL)	11.89	Montserrat Pujol (AND)	11.49w
Shot put	Antri Kasapi (CYP)	13.96	Christina Strovolidou (CYP)	13.91	Berglind Bjarnadóttir (ISL)	13.14
Discus throw	Kyriaki Pilia (CYP)	41.44	Guðbjörg Viðarsdóttir (ISL)	41.18	Anne-Marie Wirtz (LUX)	40.70

== Medal table ==
Rank	Nation	Gold	Silver	Bronze	Total
1	Cyprus	13	9	1	23
2	Iceland	10	9	9	28
3	Luxembourg	5	6	8	19
4	Andorra	1	4	4	9
5	Malta	1	2	3	6
6	Liechtenstein	1	0	1	2
7	Monaco	0	1	2	3
8	San Marino	0	0	3	3
Totals (8 entries)		31	31	31	93
