= Athletics at the 1991 Games of the Small States of Europe =

- Dates: 21–26 May
- Host city: Andorra la Vella, Andorra
- Venue: Estadi Comunal d'Andorra la Vella
- Events: 30
- Participation: 166 athletes from 8 nations

Athletics at the 1991 Games of the Small States of Europe were held in Andorra la Vella, Andorra between 21 and 26 May.

== Medal summary ==
=== Men ===
Event	Gold		Silver		Bronze	
100 metres (wind: -0.9 m/s)	Giannis Zisimides (CYP)	10.60 CR	Einar Þor Einarsson (ISL)	10.82	Laurent Kemp (LUX)	10.93
200 metres (wind: +5.5 m/s)	Anninos Markoullides (CYP)	21.05	Giannis Zisimides (CYP)	21.14	Aldo Canti (SMR)	21.22
400 metres	Anninos Markoullides (CYP)	47.27 CR	Gunnar Guðmundsson (ISL)	48.21	Luc Kohnen (LUX)	49.10
800 metres	Andreas Elia (CYP)	1:55.89	Pascal Wenzel (LUX)	1:56.03	Carlos Calvo (LUX)	1:56.29
1500 metres	Andreas Christodoulou (CYP)	3:52.70	Claude Assel (LUX)	3:54.60	Georgios Loukaidis (CYP)	3:54.98
5000 metres	Andreas Christodoulou (CYP)	14:51.9	Justin Gloden (LUX)	14:55.5	Georgios Loukaidis (CYP)	14:56.5
10,000 metres	Justin Gloden (LUX)	31:24.41	Gerard De Gaetano (MLT)	31:47.91	Mateu López (AND)	32:15.81
110 metres hurdles (wind: +0.2 m/s)	Antonis Kezos (CYP)	14.71	Thierry Eischen (LUX)	14.82	Frédéric Choquard (MON)	14.86
4×100 metres relay	Cyprus ? Antonis Kezos; Anninos Markoullides; Giannis Zisimides	40.80	Luxembourg; Laurent Kemp; Serge Müller; Bernard Felten; Thierry Eischen	41.73	Iceland; Egill Eiðsson; Einar Þor Einarsson; Gunnar Guðmundsson; Ólafur Guðmundsson	41.81
4×400 metres relay	Cyprus	3:16.94 CR	San Marino; Aldo Canti; Dominique Canti; Marco Tamagnini; Manlio Molinari	3:25.97	Andorra	3:21.81
High jump	Neophytos Kalogerou (CYP)	2.07	Antonio Pazzaglia (SMR)	2.04	Lluis Orona (AND)	2.04
Long jump	Dimitrios Araouzos (CYP)	7.46 CR	Bernard Felten (LUX)	7.13	Elias Agapiou (CYP)	7.12
Triple jump	Marios Hadjiandreou (CYP)	16.52 CR	Guy Kemp (LUX)	15.01	Panicos Pitsataris (CYP)	14.80
Shot put	Pétur Guðmundsson (ISL)	18.61 CR	Andrés Guðmundsson (ISL)	17.11	Elias Louka (CYP)	16.73
Discus throw	Eggert Bogason (ISL)	54.16	Nicos Erotokritou (CYP)	50.84	Pétur Guðmundsson (ISL)	48.92
Hammer throw	Guðmundur Karlsson (ISL)	63.54	Eggert Bogason (ISL)	55.04	Jean-Charles De Ridder (LUX)	54.02
Javelin throw	Sigurður Einarsson (ISL)	80.30 CR	Einar Vilhjálmsson (ISL)	74.16	Hristakis Telonis (CYP)	64.26

=== Women ===
Event	Gold		Silver		Bronze	
100 metres (wind: +1.5 m/s)	Georgia Paspali (CYP)	12.17	Guðrún Arnardóttir (ISL)	12.26	Nathalie Kemp (LUX)	12.27
200 metres (wind: -0.6 m/s)	Guðrún Arnardóttir (ISL)	24.72	Stalo Konstantinou (CYP)	24.79	Nathalie Kemp (LUX)	25.03
400 metres	Sandra Felten (LUX)	56.13	Androula Sialou (CYP)	56.62	Maria Georgiadou (CYP)	57.73
800 metres	Eleni Hadzivasili (CYP)	2:17.94	Marianna Haralambous (CYP)	2:20.95	Caroline Porfirio (MON)	2:21.28
1500 metres	Martha Ernstdóttir (ISL)	4:32.44 CR	Elena Agamemnonos (CYP)	4:38.98	Eleni Hadzivasili (CYP)	4:39.17
3000 metres	Martha Ernstdóttir (ISL)}	9:41.93	Myriam Testud (MON)	10:13.59	Elena Agamemnonos (CYP)	10:34.29
100 metres hurdles (-0.3 m/s)	Guðrún Arnardóttir (ISL)	14.19 CR	Sonia Del Prete (MON)	14.22	Daniele Konter (LUX)	14.44
4×100 metres relay	Luxembourg; Nathalie Kemp; Nicole Feitler; Daniele Konter; Sandra Felten	47.80	Cyprus ? ? ? Georgia Paspali	47.83	Monaco; Sonia Del Prete; Piera Parodi; Caroline Porfirio; Myriam Testud	48.98
4×400 metres relay	Cyprus ? Eleni Hadzivasili; Dora Kyriakou ?	3:56.75	Andorra	4:11.31	Monaco; Piera Parodi; Myriam Testud; Caroline Porfirio; Sonia Del Prete	4:28.84
High jump	Disa Gísladóttir (ISL)	1.83	Sonia Del Prete (MON)	1.80	Margarida Moreno (AND)	1.80
Long jump	Sonia Del Prete (MON)	6.16	Myroula Kapitzi (CYP)	5.55	Christiana Philippou (CYP)	5.46
Shot put	Elli Evangelidou (CYP)	15.02 CR	Iris Grönfeldt (ISL)	14.13	Christina Strovolidou (CYP)	12.54
Javelin throw	Iris Grönfeldt (ISL)	56.20 CR	Hrysoula Georgiou (CYP)	51.50	Eleni Teloni (CYP)	48.26

== Medal table ==
Rank	Nation	Gold	Silver	Bronze	Total
1	Cyprus	16	9	12	37
2	Iceland	10	7	2	19
3	Luxembourg	3	7	7	17
4	Monaco	1	3	4	8
5	San Marino	0	2	1	3
6	Andorra	0	1	4	5
7	Malta	0	1	0	1
Totals (7 entries)		30	30	30	90
