= Bogason =

Bogason is a surname. Notable people with the surname include:

- Eggert Bogason (born 1960), Icelandic athlete
- Tróndur Bogason (born 1976), Faroese composer and musician
