= List of Maltese records in athletics =

The following are the national records in athletics in Malta maintained by its national athletics federation: Malta Amateur Athletic Association (MAAA).

== Outdoor ==
Key to tables: Awaiting ratification Record not kept by MAAA Not ratified or later rescinded by MAAA

=== Men ===
Event	Record	Athlete	Date	Meet	Place	Ref.
60 m	6.88 NWI	Rachid Chouhal	19 February 2000		Malta	
100 m	10.23 (+0.9 m/s)	Beppe Grillo	25 May 2024	Balkan Championships	İzmir, Turkey	
200 m	21.03 (−0.4 m/s)	Kevin Moore	14 August 2014	European Championships	Zürich, Switzerland	
300 m	34.99	Omar El Aida Chaffey	5 May 2018	MAAA Relay Championships	Marsa, Malta	
400 m	46.83	Graham Pellegrini	1 June 2023 (Note: by official result source; 4 June 2023 by MAAA source, a typo)	Games of the Small States of Europe	Marsa, Malta	
800 m	1:46.08	Jared Micallef	13 April 2025	Australian Championships	Perth, Australia	
1500 m	3:44.48	Jared Micallef	1 June 2023	Games of the Small States of Europe	Marsa, Malta	
1500 m	3:37.52	Jordan Gusman	17 May 2018		Los Angeles, United States	
Mile	3:57.29	Jordan Gusman	23 December 2017		Sydney, Australia	
3000 m	7:50.57	Jordan Gusman	14 August 2021	Ed Murphey Classic	Memphis, United States	
5000 m	13:29.17	Jordan Gusman	3 July 2021 (Note: by World Athletics and official Result source; 3 May 2021 by federation source, a typo)	KBC Night of Athletics	Heusden-Zolder, Belgium	
5000 m	13:21.35	Jordan Gusman	2 May 2019		Palo Alto, United States	
5 km (road)	13:54	Jordan Gusman	22 November 2018		San Jose, United States	
10,000 m	28:29.85	Jordan Gusman	31 March 2023 (Note: by official result source; 14 December 2019 by MAAA source, a typo)	Stanford Invitational	Palo Alto, United States	
10 km (road)	29:39	Jordan Gusman	3 July 2022	Southern Coast University 10km Run	Gold Coast, Australia	
10 km (road)	28:39	Jordan Gusman	23 October 2016		Burnie, Australia	
15 km (road)	46:37+	Jordan Gusman	8 October 2023	Chicago Marathon	Chicago, United States	
20 km (road)	1:02:24+	Jordan Gusman	8 October 2023	Chicago Marathon	Chicago, United States	
Half marathon	1:03:41	Jordan Gusman	15 January 2023	Houston Half Marathon	Houston, United States	
25 km (road)	1:18:20+	Jordan Gusman	8 October 2023	Chicago Marathon	Chicago, United States	
30 km (road)	1:34:20+	Jordan Gusman	8 October 2023	Chicago Marathon	Chicago, United States	
Marathon	2:25:02 (Note: by official result source: 2:25:03 by federation source)	Charlton Debono	1 December 2019	Valencia Marathon	Valencia, Spain	
Marathon	2:13:13	Jordan Gusman	8 October 2023	Chicago Marathon	Chicago, United States	
60 m hurdles	8.33 NWI	Daniel Saliba	29 January 2022	Pre-Season Meet 2	Marsa, Malta	
110 m hurdles	14.69 (+0.4 m/s)	Daniel Saliba	17 July 2021	EAP International Meeting	Marsa, Malta	
300 m hurdles	44.25	Luka Aras	29 January 2022	Pre-Season Meet 2	Marsa, Malta	
400 m hurdles	54.53	Jordan Pace	29 May 2025	Games of the Small States of Europe	Andorra la Vella, Andorra	
3000 m steeplechase	9:24.89	Luke Micallef	26 July 2018 (Note: by federation source; 25 July 2018 by World Athletics source)	MAAA Summer Meeting 2	Marsa, Malta	
High jump	1.90 m	Cassar Tomeggiani	24 June 2017		Marsa, Malta	
Pole vault	4.85 m	Nicolai Bonello	18 May 2024	Challenge Meeting 5	Marsa, Malta	
Long jump	7.73 m (+1.4 m/s)	Jeremy Zammit	29 January 2022	Pre-Season Meet 2	Marsa, Malta	
Triple jump	15.05 m (−1.5 m/s)	Andy Grech	1 June 2013	Games of the Small States of Europe	Luxembourg City, Luxembourg	
Triple jump	15.20 m (+1.2 m/s) (Note: not ratified by federation but recognised by World Athletics)	Ian Paul Grech	10 July 2021	Maltese Championships	Marsa, Malta	
Shot put	15.32 m	Lawrence Ransley	14 May 2017	Maltese Championships	Marsa, Malta	
Discus throw	51.92 m	Luke Farrugia	4 July 2020	Micro Event 2	Marsa, Malta	
Hammer throw	56.95 m	Luca Martini	27 June 2020 (Note: 27 July 2020 by federation source, probably a typo)	Micro Event 1	Marsa, Malta	
Javelin throw	66.47 m	Bradley Mifsud	30 May 2021	Andorran Championships	Andorra la Vella, Andorra	
Decathlon	5000 pts (Note: not ratified by MAAA but recognised by World Athletics)	Kevin Cranmer	27–28 May 2017	England Combined Events Championships	Bedford, United Kingdom	
Decathlon	100m / Long jump / Shot put / High jump / 400m / 110m H / Discus / Pole vault / Javelin / 1500m; 12.75 (−1.6 m/s) / 5.40 m (+1.5 m/s) / 10.31 m / 1.72 m / 56.61 / 16.88 (+1.1 m/s) / 26.72 m / 3.33 m / 37.51 m / 5:02.47					
20 km walk (road)						
50 km walk (road)						
4 × 100 m relay	40.57	Malta; Jacob El Aida Chaffey; Graham Pellegrini; Luke Bezzina; Beppe Grillo	26 May 2024	Balkan Championships	İzmir, Turkey	
4 × 100 m relay	40.51	Malta; Omar El Aida Chaffey; Graham Pellegrini; Luke Bezzina; Beppe Grillo	14 July 2024	Meeting Internazionale Sport e Solidarieta	Lignano Sabbiadoro, Italy	
4 × 400 m relay	3:13.71	Malta; Nick Bonett; Isaac Bonnici; Jared Micallef; Matthew Galea Soler	31 May 2025	Games of the Small States of Europe	Andorra la Vella, Andorra	

=== Women ===
Event	Record	Athlete	Date	Meet	Place	Ref.
100 m	11.54 (+1.1 m/s)	Charlotte Wingfield	10 May 2017	Maltese Championships	Marsa, Malta	
200 m	23.74 (+1.5 m/s)	Carla Scicluna	3 June 2023 (Note: by official result source; 4 June by MAAA source, a typo)	Games of the Small States of Europe	Marsa, Malta	
400 m	52.37	Janet Richard	20 June 2023	European Team Championships	Chorzów, Poland	
800 m	1:59.56	Tanya Blake	24 May 2003	Prefontaine Classic	Eugene, United States	
1500 m	4:12.64	Gina McNamara	14 July 2023	40th Harry Jerome Track Classic	Langley, Canada	
Mile	4:44.57	Gina McNamara	4 August 2023	Sir Walter Miler	Raleigh, United States	
Mile (road)	4:53.54 Wo	Gina McNamara	1 October 2023	World Road Running Championships	Riga, Latvia	
3000 m	9:39.97	Carol Galea	11 June 1994		Dublin, Ireland	
5000 m	16:43.8 h	Carol Galea	8 April 1995		Marsa, Malta	
5 km (road)	18:17	Giselle Camilleri	31 December 2005		Trier, Germany	
10,000 m	34:25.1 h Mx	Carol Galea	30 April 1997		Watford, United Kingdom	
10,000 m	34:55.78	Carol Galea	1 June 2001	Games of the Small States of Europe	San Marino, San Marino	
10 km (road)	36:24	Lisa Bezzina	9 January 2022	10K Valencia Ibercaja	Valencia, Spain	
15 km (road)	54:45+	Lisa Bezzina	26 January 2020	Seville Half Marathon	Seville, Spain	
Half marathon	1:17:07	Lisa Bezzina	26 January 2020	Seville Half Marathon	Seville, Spain	
Marathon	2:36:52 (Note: by World Athletics source; 2:36:53 by federation source)	Carol Galea	1 December 1996	Florence Marathon	Florence, Italy	
100 m hurdles	15.25 (±0.0 m/s)	Maria Sciberras	20 June 2010	European Team Championships 3rd League	Marsa, Malta	
100 m hurdles	14.96	Maria Sciberras	2 May 2009		Marsa, Malta	
300 m hurdles	47.14	Bianca Shoemake	11 February 2023	Maltese Winter Championships	Marsa, Malta	
400 m hurdles	1:04.72	Marilyn Grech	10 August 2019	European Team Championships	Varaždin, Croatia	
3000 m steeplechase	10:54.25	Mona Lisa Camilleri	29 June 2019	MAAA Championships	Marsa, Malta	
High jump	1.61 m	Chloe Gambin	19 February 2011	Athletics Malta Meeting	Marsa, Malta	
High jump	1.61 m	Rachela Pace	5 May 2017		Marsa, Malta	
Pole vault	3.80 m	Peppijna Dalli	19 June 2021	European Team Championships	Limassol, Cyprus	
Long jump	6.41 m (+0.5 m/s)	Rebecca Camilleri	2 June 2014 (Note: by federation source; 1 June 2014 by World Athletics source)	Maltese Championships	Marsa, Malta	
Triple jump	13.04 m (+1.2 m/s)	Claire Azzopardi	22 April 2023	Athletics Malta Challenge Meeting #4	Marsa, Malta	
Shot put	12.51 m (Note: indoor mark ratified as absolute record)	Jennifer Pace	22 October 1977		Windsor, Canada	
Discus throw	42.86 m	Antonella Chouhal	1 July 2009		Marsa, Malta	
Hammer throw	52.50 m	Mireya Cassar	9 April 2022		Marsa, Malta	
Javelin throw	36.54	Jennifer Pace	3 June 2005		Marsa, Malta	
Javelin throw	45.16 m (Note: not ratified by MAAA but recognized by World Athletics)	Joanne Vella	18 March 2017	MAAA Challenge Meet	Marsa, Malta	
Heptathlon						
Heptathlon	100m H / High jump / Shot put / 200m / Long jump / Javelin / 800m					
20 km walk (road)						
50 km walk (road)						
4 × 100 m relay	44.98	Malta; Claire Azzopardi; Janet Richard; Carla Scicluna; Charlotte Wingfield	7 May 2023	Sprint Festival Relays	Florence, Italy	
4 × 400 m relay	3:45.69	Malta; Charlene Attard; Suzanne Spiteri; Céline Pace; Tanya Blake	7 June 2003	Games of the Small States of Europe	Marsa, Malta	

=== Mixed ===
Event	Record	Athlete	Date	Meet	Place	Ref.
4 × 400 m relay	3:26.79 (Note: by World Athletics and official result sources; 3:26.75 by MAAA source, probably a typo)	Malta; Nick Bonett; Martha Spiteri; Matthew Galea Soler; Gina McNamara	29 June 2025	European Team Championships	Maribor, Slovenia	

== Indoor ==
=== Men ===
Event	Record	Athlete	Date	Meet	Place	Ref.
60 m	6.76 (semi final)	Darren Gilford	14 February 2004	Aviva Indoor Grand Prix	Birmingham, United Kingdom	
60 m	6.76 (final)	Darren Gilford	14 February 2004	Aviva Indoor Grand Prix	Birmingham, United Kingdom	
200 m	21.83	Graham Pellegrini	14 February 2026	One day Indoor Match	Athens, Greece	
200 m	21.3 h (Note: not ratified by MAAA but recognized by World Athletics)	Mario Bonello	21 February 1998		Marsa, Malta	
400 m	47.55	Graham Pellegrini	10 February 2024	Balkan Championships	Istanbul, Turkey	
800 m
800 m	2:02.23 (Note: not ratified by MAAA but recognized by World Athletics)	Marco Filippi	31 January 2021		Padua, Italy	
800 m	1:53.92 OT	Benjamin Micallef	1 February 2020	UW Invitational	Seattle, United States	
800 m	1:49.07 OT (Note: ratified by MAAA but not recognized by World Athletics)	Benjamin Micallef	12 February 2022	UW Husky Classic	Seattle, United States	
1500 m	4:39.49	Gerald Grech	8 March 2025		Padua, Italy	
3000 m	7:44.40	Jordan Gusman	30 January 2022	BU Thomas Terrier Classic	Boston, United States	
5000 m	13:24.05	Jordan Gusman	12 February 2022	BU David Hemery Valentine Invitational	Boston, United States	
60 m hurdles
60 m hurdles	8.49 (Note: not ratified by MAAA but recognized by World Athletics)	Daniel Saliba	9 February 2020		Dour, Belgium	
High jump
High jump	1.74 m (Note: not ratified by MAAA but recognized by World Athletics) (Note: record set during heptathlon competition)	Kevin Cranmer	6 January 2018		Sheffield, United Kingdom	
Pole vault
Pole vault	3.68 m (Note: not ratified by MAAA but recognized by World Athletics) (Note: record set during heptathlon competition)	Kevin Cranmer	7 January 2018		Sheffield, United Kingdom	
Long jump	7.84 m	Jeremy Zammit	14 January 2023	Clemson Invitational	Clemson, United States	
Triple jump
Triple jump	14.12 m (Note: not ratified by MAAA but recognized by World Athletics)	Ian Paul Grech	30 January 2016		London, United Kingdom	
Shot put
Shot put	10.42 m (Note: not ratified by MAAA but recognized by World Athletics) (Note: record set during heptathlon competition)	Kevin Cranmer	17 December 2016		London, United Kingdom	
Heptathlon
Heptathlon	3733 pts (Note: not ratified by MAAA but recognized by World Athletics)	Kevin Cranmer	17–18 December 2016		London, United Kingdom	
Heptathlon	60m / Long jump / Shot put / High jump / 60m H / Pole vault / 1000m; 8.09 / 5.33 m / 10.42 m / 1.66 m / 9.53 / 3.40 m / 3:02.59					
5000 m walk						
4 × 400 m relay						

=== Women ===
Event	Record	Athlete	Date	Meet	Place	Ref.
60 m	7.44	Charlotte Wingfield	28 January 2017	Welsh Championships	Cardiff, United Kingdom	
200 m	24.03	Charlotte Wingfield	4 February 2023	Scottish Championships	Glasgow, United Kingdom	
400 m	55.77	Janet Richard	18 January 2020	London Senior Games	London, United Kingdom	
800 m	2:06.72 (Note: not ratified by MAAA but recognised by World Athletics)	Tanya Blake	31 January 2004	Boston Indoor Games	Roxbury, United States	
1500 m	4:49.64 (Note: not ratified by MAAA but recognised by World Athletics)	Giselle Camilleri	18 February 2012		Aubière, France	
1500 m	4:40.80	Mona Lisa Camilleri	23 January 2019	BMC Sheffield Open Series	Sheffield, United Kingdom	
3000 m	10:25.13 (Note: not ratified by MAAA but recognised by World Athletics)	Giselle Camilleri	7 March 2015		Nantes, France	
60 m hurdles	9.56 (Note: not ratified by MAAA but recognised by World Athletics)	Rebecca Fitz	30 January 2016		London, United Kingdom	
High jump						
Pole vault	2.92 m	Mirae Micallef	21 January 2023	London Indoor Games	London, United Kingdom	
Long jump	6.08 m (1st jump)	Rebecca Camilleri	22 February 2015	Italian Championships	Padua, Italy	
Long jump	6.08 m (2nd jump)	Rebecca Camilleri	22 February 2015	Italian Championships	Padua, Italy	
Triple jump	13.40 m A	Rachela Pace	10 February 2024	Don Kirby Invitational	Albuquerque, United States	
Shot put	13.06 m	Antonella Cachia	21 February 2001		Minsk, Belarus	
Pentathlon						
Pentathlon	60m H / High jump / Shot put / Long jump / 800m					
3000 m walk						
4 × 400 m relay						
