= Montserrat Pujol =

Montserrat Pujol is the name of

- Montserrat Pujol (Spanish athlete) (born 1961), Spanish middle-distance runner, hurdler and sprinter
- Montserrat Pujol (Andorran athlete) (born 1979), Andorran sprinter and long jumper
