= Masters M40 3000 metres world record progression =

This is the progression of world record improvements of the 3000 metres M40 division of Masters athletics. Records must be set in properly conducted, official competitions under the standing IAAF rules unless modified by World Masters Athletics. The M40 division consists of male athletes who have reached the age of 40 but have not yet reached the age of 45, so exactly from their 40th birthday to the day before their 45th birthday. vandeWansem set his record on his 40th birthday.

Key

Incomplete information Pending better indoor records

| Hand | Auto | Athlete | Nationality | Birthdate | Location | Date |
|---|---|---|---|---|---|---|
| | 7:37.92 i | Bernard Lagat | United States | 12 December 1974 | Metz | 25 February 2015 |
| | 7:42.75 | Bernard Lagat | United States | 12 December 1974 | Lucerne | 14 July 2015 |
| | 8:00.23+ | Bernard Lagat | United States | 12 December 1974 | Eugene | 29 May 2015 |
| | 8:01.14 i | Vyacheslav Shabunin | Russia | 27 September 1969 | Moscow | 7 February 2010 |
| | 8:02.54 | Vyacheslav Shabunin | Russia | 27 September 1969 | Moscow | 7 June 2010 |
| | 8:03.69 | Antoni Bernadó | Andorra | 9 December 1966 | Palafrugell | 26 May 2007 |
| | 8:10.31 | Gerald Miedler | Austria | 19 May 1961 | Bern | 10 July 2004 |
| | 8:13.89 | Andres Espinosa Perez | Mexico | 4 February 1963 | Richmond | 23 June 2004 |
| | 8:15.38 | Vittorio Fontanella | Italy | 17 March 1953 | Livorno | 18 June 1995 |
| 8:15.5 | | John vandeWansem | Netherlands | 5 July 1950 | Uden | 5 July 1990 |
| 8:22.0 | | Alain Mimoun | France | 1 January 1921 | St Maur | 6 June 1962 |
