= Evripides Demosthenous =

Cypriot sprinter (born 1972)

Personal information
- Born: 14 October 1972 (age 53)

Sport
- Sport: Track and field

Evripides Demosthenous (Greek: Ευριπίδης Δημοσθένους; born 14 October 1972) is a retired Cypriot sprinter who specialised in the 400 metres. He represented his country at two Summer Olympics (1996 and 2000) and three consecutive World Championships, starting in 1995. He has personal bests of 46.16 seconds outdoors (Palma de Mallorca 1999) and 47.39 seconds indoors (Piraeus 1998). Both are standing national records.

== Competition record ==
Year	Competition	Venue	Position	Event	Notes
Representing Cyprus
1991	European Junior Championships	Thessaloniki, Greece	14th (h)	400 m	49.20
1993	Games of the Small States of Europe	Malta	3rd	200 m	22.26
1993	Games of the Small States of Europe	Malta	1st	400 m	48.48
1993	Games of the Small States of Europe	Malta	1st	4 × 100 m relay	41.28
1993	Games of the Small States of Europe	Malta	1st	4 × 400 m relay	3:16.62
1993	Mediterranean Games	Narbonne, France	5th	4 × 400 m relay	3:14.45
1994	European Indoor Championships	Paris, France	11th (sf)	400 m	47.91
1994	European Championships	Helsinki, Finland	20th (h)	400 m	47.40
1994	Commonwealth Games	Victoria, Canada	(h)	400 m	47.78
1995	World Indoor Championships	Barcelona, Spain	14th (h)	400 m	47.95
1995	World Championships	Gothenburg, Sweden	39th (h)	400 m	46.84
1995	Universiade	Fukuoka, Japan	20th (qf)	400 m	47.13
1996	European Indoor Championships	Stockholm, Sweden	–	400 m	DQ
1996	Olympic Games	Atlanta, United States	43rd (h)	400 m	46.76
1997	World Championships	Athens, Greece	41st (h)	400 m	47.57
1998	European Indoor Championships	Valencia, Spain	19th (h)	400 m	48.16
1998	European Championships	Budapest, Hungary	24th (h)	400 m	47.15
1998	European Championships	Budapest, Hungary	12th (h)	4 × 100 m relay	40.96
1998	Commonwealth Games	Kuala Lumpur, Malaysia	23rd (qf)	400 m	46.89
1999	Universiade	Palma de Mallorca, Spain	10th (sf)	400 m	46.16
1999	World Championships	Seville, Spain	37th (h)	400 m	46.72
2000	Olympic Games	Sydney, Australia	–	400 m	DNF
2003	Games of the Small States of Europe	Marsa, Malta	3rd	400 m	48.19
2003	Games of the Small States of Europe	Marsa, Malta	1st	4 × 400 m relay	3:12.51
