= Gian Nicola Berardi =

Sammarinese athlete (born 1979)

Personal information
- Born: 22 February 1979 (age 47)

Sport
- Sport: Athletics
- Event: Sprint

Gian Nicola Berardi (born 21 February 1979) is a retired athlete from San Marino who specialised in the sprinting events. He represented his country at the 2004 Summer Olympics, as well as two outdoor and three indoor World Championships.

== Career ==
Berardi made his major championship debut when running the 60 metres at the 2001 IAAF World Indoor Championships in Lisbon, Portugal, running 7.00 seconds in his qualifying heat for the 60m without successfully qualifying for the semi-finals. That summer, he competed in the 100 metres at the 2001 European Athletics U23 Championships in Amsterdam, Netherlands, running 10.80 seconds but not progressing to the semi-finals. He subsequently represented San Marino at the 2001 World Championships in Athletics in Edmonton, Canada in August 2021, running 10.76 seconds to finish sixth in his preliminary heat.

He ran for San Marino at the 2002 European Athletics Championships in Munich, Germany finishing seventh in his heat in a time of 10.73 seconds. In March 2003, he competed over 60 metres in England, Birmingham at the 2003 IAAF World Indoor Championships over 60 metres. He also ran at the 2003 IAAF World Indoor Championships in Paris, France.

In March 2004, he competed over 60 metres in Budapest, Hungary at the 2004 IAAF World Indoor Championships over 60 metres. He competed for San Marino at the 2004 Summer Olympics in Athens, Greece, running 10.76 seconds for the 100 metres and not progressing through his preliminary heat.

== Personal life ==
Apart from being a sprinter, he also represented San Marino in basketball.

== Competition record ==
Year	Competition	Venue	Position	Event	Notes
Representing San Marino
2001	World Indoor Championships	Lisbon, Portugal	43rd (h)	60 m	7.00
2001	Games of the Small States of Europe	Serravalle, San Marino	3rd	100 m	10.62
2001	World Championships	Edmonton, Canada	53rd (h)	100 m	10.76
2001	Mediterranean Games	Radès, Tunisia	18th (h)	100 m	10.84
2002	European Championships	Munich, Germany	41st (h)	100 m	10.73
2003	World Indoor Championships	Birmingham, England	48th (h)	60 m	7.02
2003	Games of the Small States of Europe	Marsa, Malta	4th	100 m	10.60
2003	Games of the Small States of Europe	Marsa, Malta	3rd	200 m	21.68
2003	Games of the Small States of Europe	Marsa, Malta	3rd	4 × 100 m relay	41.71
2003	World Championships	Paris, France	55th (h)	100 m	10.84
2004	World Indoor Championships	Budapest, Hungary	48th (h)	60 m	7.01
2004	Olympic Games	Athens, Greece	63rd (h)	100 m	10.76

== Personal bests ==
Outdoor

- 100 metres – 10.60 (+0.5 m/s) (Marsa 2003) NR
- 200 metres – 21.68 (+0.3 m/s) (Marsa 2003)

Indoor

- 60 metres – 6.87 (Ancona 2004) NR
- 200 metres – 25.57 (Eaubonne 2007)
