= Athletics at the 1989 Games of the Small States of Europe =

- Dates: 17–20 May
- Host city: Nicosia, Cyprus
- Venue: Makario Stadium
- Events: 25
- Participation: 123 athletes from 8 nations

Athletics at the 1989 Games of the Small States of Europe were held at the Makario Stadium in Nicosia, Cyprus between 17 and 20 May.

== Medal summary ==
=== Men ===
Event	Gold		Silver		Bronze	
100 metres (wind: +0.3 m/s)	Giannis Zisimides (CYP)	10.62 CR	Jón Arnar Magnússon (ISL)	10.92		10.93
200 metres (wind: +2.0 m/s)	Anninos Markoullides (CYP)	21.75	Giannis Zisimides (CYP)	21.80	Marco Tamagnini (SMR)	22.24
400 metres	Marco Tamagnini (SMR)	47.84 CR	Ioannis Markoullidis (CYP)	48.46	Gunnar Guðmundsson (ISL)	49.36
800 metres	Spyros Spyrou (CYP)	1:51.51 CR	Steve Arendt (LUX)	1:52.23	Philippos Stylianoudis (CYP)	1:52.32
1500 metres	Spyros Spyrou (CYP)	3:52.35	Nikos Vassiliou (CYP)	3:53.50	Claude Assel (LUX)	3:53.88
10,000 metres	Nikos Vassiliou (CYP)	30:59.92	Camille Schmit (LUX)	31:18.01	Gerard De Gaetano (MLT)	31:21.04
110 metres hurdles (wind: NWI)	Petros Evripidou (CYP)	14.72	Frédéric Choquard (MON)	14.72	Marc Kiffer (LUX)	15.1
4×100 metres relay	Cyprus	41.70	San Marino; Dominique Canti; Nicola Selva; Luciano Scarponi; Marco Tamagnini	42.99	Andorra	43.19
4×400 metres relay	Cyprus	3:17.27	San Marino; Andrea Tamagnini; Manlio Molinari; Marco Tamagnini; Manuel Maiani	3:23.52	Andorra	3:24.34
High jump	Alexis Neophytou (CYP)	2.10 CR	Theocharous (CYP)	2.05	Gunnlaugur Grettisson (ISL)	2.05
Long jump	Dimitrios Araouzos (CYP)	7.38 CR	Jón Arnar Magnússon (ISL)	7.24	Elias Agapiou (CYP)	7.13
Triple jump	Elias Agapiou (CYP)	15.32	Guy Kemp (LUX)	15.07	Panicos Pitsataris (CYP)	15.00
Shot put	Katerinos Savva (CYP)	15.22	Michalis Louka (CYP)	15.12	Marco Vogelsang (LIE)	15.00
Javelin throw	Hristakis Telonis (CYP)	67.74 CR	Adamos Christodoulou (CYP)	63.00	Germain Wolff (LUX)	58.26

=== Women ===
Event	Gold		Silver		Bronze	
100 metres (wind: +0.6 m/s)	Stalo Konstantinou (CYP)	11.91	Súsanna Helgadóttir (ISL)	11.95	Georgia Paspali (CYP)	12.05
200 metres (wind: +0.5 m/s)	Yvonne Hasler (LIE)	24.84	Stalo Konstantinou (CYP)	24.91	Súsanna Helgadóttir (ISL)	25.24
400 metres	Oddný Arnadóttir (ISL)	55.12 CR	Nicole Feitler (LUX)	56.74	Androula Sialou (CYP)	56.84
800 metres	Birgit Olschnögger (LIE)	2:19.11	Andrea Avraam (CYP)	2:19.30	Tekla Tapakoudi (CYP)	2:20.97
1500 metres	Andrea Avraam (CYP)	4:34.74	Daniele Kaber (LUX)	4:34.94	Martha Ernstdóttir (ISL)	4:36.17
3000 metres	Daniele Kaber (LUX)	9:17.2 CR	Martha Ernstdóttir (ISL)}	9:30.6	Andrea Avraam (CYP)	9:40.3
100 metres hurdles (+1.8 m/s)	Manuela Marxer (LIE)	14.32 CR	Maroula Lambrou (CYP)	14.75	Sonia Del Prete (MON)	14.93
4×100 metres relay	Cyprus; Maroula Lambrou; Maria Georgiadou; Stalo Konstantinou; Georgia Paspali	46.03	Liechtenstein; Karin Sutter; Yvonne Hasler; Manuela Marxer; Marianne Biedermann	46.92	Luxembourg; Véronique Linster; Daniele Konter; Nicole Feitler; Sandy Leches	48.28
High jump	Margarida Moreno (AND)	1.77	Sonia Del Prete (MON)	1.71	Þóra Einarsdóttir (ISL)	1.67
Long jump	Maroula Lambrou (CYP)	6.15 (w)	Christiana Philippou (CYP)	6.03	Manuela Marxer (LIE)	5.94
Javelin throw	Hrysoula Georgiou (CYP)	48.56	Iris Grönfeldt (ISL)	47.72	Jeanette Beck (LIE)	44.88

== Medal table ==
Rank	Nation	Gold	Silver	Bronze	Total
1	Cyprus	18	10	8	36
2	Liechtenstein	3	1	3	7
3	Iceland	1	5	5	11
4	Luxembourg	1	5	4	10
5	San Marino	1	2	1	4
6	Andorra	1	0	2	3
7	Monaco	0	2	1	3
8	Malta	0	0	1	1
Totals (8 entries)		25	25	25	75
