= Georgios Arestis =

Cypriot athlete (born 1981)

Georgios Arestis (Greek: Γεώργιος Αρέστης; born 27 December 1981) is a Cypriot athlete who competes in the shot put and discus throw. He represented his country at two Commonwealth Games and won multiple medals at the Games of the Small States of Europe.

== Competition record ==
Year	Competition	Venue	Position	Event	Notes
Representing Cyprus
1999	European Junior Championships	Riga, Latvia	15th (q)	Shot put	15.17 m
1999	European Junior Championships	Riga, Latvia	18th (q)	Discus throw	42.13 m
2000	World Junior Championships	Santiago, Chile	26th (q)	Shot put	16.09 m
2000	World Junior Championships	Santiago, Chile	21st (q)	Discus throw	48.10 m
2001	Games of the Small States of Europe	Serravalle, San Marino	2nd	Shot put	15.71 m
2001	Games of the Small States of Europe	Serravalle, San Marino	1st	Discus throw	48.46 m
2001	European U23 Championships	Amsterdam, Netherlands	18th (q)	Discus throw	49.55 m
2002	Commonwealth Games	Manchester, United Kingdom	11th	Discus throw	51.14 m
2003	Games of the Small States of Europe	Marsa, Malta	1st	Shot put	15.98 m
2003	Games of the Small States of Europe	Marsa, Malta	3rd	Discus throw	52.03 m
2003	European U23 Championships	Bydgoszcz, Poland	–	Discus throw	NM
2005	Games of the Small States of Europe	Andorra la Vella, Andorra	2nd	Shot put	16.26 m
2005	Games of the Small States of Europe	Andorra la Vella, Andorra	1st	Discus throw	53.70 m
2007	Universiade	Bangkok, Thailand	14th	Shot put	17.56 m
2009	European Indoor Championships	Turin, Italy	23rd (q)	Shot put	17.65 m
2009	Games of the Small States of Europe	Nicosia, Cyprus	1st	Shot put	18.14 m
2009	Mediterranean Games	Pescara, Italy	10th	Shot put	17.71 m
2009	Universiade	Belgrade, Serbia	9th (q)	Shot put	18.58 m
2010	European Championships	Barcelona, Spain	21st (q)	Shot put	18.23 m
2010	Commonwealth Games	Delhi, India	7th	Shot put	18.20 m
2011	Games of the Small States of Europe	Schaan, Liechtenstein	2nd	Shot put	17.80 m
2012	European Championships	Helsinki, Finland	23rd (q)	Shot put	18.16 m
2013	Games of the Small States of Europe	Luxembourg, Luxembourg	4th	Shot put	17.04 m

== Personal bests ==
Outdoor

- Shot put – 19.34 (Lefkosia 2009)
- Discus throw – 55.65 (Trípoli 2002)

Indoor

- Shot put – 19.43 (Peanía 2009) NR
