= Mario Bonello =

Maltese sprinter

Personal information
- Born: 28 January 1974 (age 52) Valletta, Malta

Sport
- Sport: Track and field

Mario Bonello (born 28 January 1974) is a retired Maltese athlete who specialised in the sprinting events. He represented his country at two Olympic Games, in 1996 and 2000, as well as two outdoor and one indoor World Championships. In addition, he won multiple medals at the Games of the Small States of Europe.

== Competition record ==
Year	Competition	Venue	Position	Event	Notes
Representing Malta
1993	Games of the Small States of Europe	Malta	3rd	4 × 100 m relay	
1993	Games of the Small States of Europe	Malta	3rd	4 × 400 m relay	
1993	Universiade	Buffalo, United States	39th (h)	100 m	10.97
1993	Universiade	Buffalo, United States	42nd (h)	200 m	10.97
1993	World Championships	Gothenburg, Sweden	58th (h)	100 m	11.05
1993	World Championships	Gothenburg, Sweden	64th (h)	200 m	22.60
1994	European Championships	Helsinki, Finland	41st (h)	100 m	11.16
1994	European Championships	Helsinki, Finland	30th (h)	200 m	22.60
1995	Universiade	Fukuoka, Japan	48th (h)	200 m	22.35
1996	Olympic Games	Atlanta, United States	86th (h)	100 m	10.89
1997	World Indoor Championships	Paris, France	50th (h)	60 m	6.97
1997	Games of the Small States of Europe	Reykjavík, Iceland	2nd	200 m	21.38
1997	Games of the Small States of Europe	Reykjavík, Iceland	3rd	4 × 100 m relay	43.42
1997	World Championships	Athens, Greece	89th (h)	100 m	10.92
1997	Universiade	Catania, Italy	47th (h)	100 m	11.11
1997	Universiade	Catania, Italy	8th (h)	200 m	21.60
1998	European Indoor Championships	Valencia, Spain	36th (h)	60 m	6.90
1998	European Indoor Championships	Valencia, Spain	30th (h)	200 m	22.30
1998	European Championships	Budapest, Hungary	43rd (h)	100 m	10.92
1998	European Championships	Budapest, Hungary	30th (h)	200 m	21.65
1999	Games of the Small States of Europe	Schaan, Liechtenstein	3rd	200 m	21.62
1999	Games of the Small States of Europe	Schaan, Liechtenstein	3rd	4 × 400 m relay	3:20.40
2000	Olympic Games	Sydney, Australia	85th (h)	100 m	11.06
2001	Games of the Small States of Europe	Serravalle, San Marino	5th	100 m	10.74
2001	Games of the Small States of Europe	Serravalle, San Marino	2nd	200 m	21.42
2001	Games of the Small States of Europe	Serravalle, San Marino	2nd	4 × 100 m relay	41.13
2001	Mediterranean Games	Radès, Tunisia	16th (h)	100 m	10.78
2001	Mediterranean Games	Radès, Tunisia	15th (h)	200 m	22.02
2003	Games of the Small States of Europe	Marsa, Malta	4th	200 m	21.73
2003	Games of the Small States of Europe	Marsa, Malta	2nd	4 × 100 m relay	41.00
2003	Games of the Small States of Europe	Marsa, Malta	3rd	4 × 400 m relay	3:16.18
2005	Games of the Small States of Europe	Andorra la Vella, Andorra	3rd	200 m	21.95
2005	Games of the Small States of Europe	Andorra la Vella, Andorra	1st	4 × 100 m	40.63
2005	Games of the Small States of Europe	Andorra la Vella, Andorra	2nd	4 × 400 m	3:18.74
2005	Mediterranean Games	Almería, Spain	13th (h)	200 m	21.92
2005	Mediterranean Games	Almería, Spain	7th	4 × 100 m relay	41.63
2007	Games of the Small States of Europe	Monaco	–	200 m	DQ
2007	Games of the Small States of Europe	Monaco	2nd	4 × 100 m	41.08
2007	Games of the Small States of Europe	Monaco	5th	4 × 400 m	3:18.90
2009	Games of the Small States of Europe	Nicosia, Cyprus	5th	200 m	21.78
2009	Games of the Small States of Europe	Nicosia, Cyprus	2nd	4 × 100 m	41.86
2009	Games of the Small States of Europe	Nicosia, Cyprus	3rd	4 × 400 m	3:18.57
2010	European Championships	Barcelona, Spain	34th (h)	100 m	11.09

== Personal bests ==
Outdoor

- 100 metres – 10.64 (+0.1 m/s) (Marsa 2000)
- 200 metres – 21.46 (+0.9 m/s) (Rieti 2003)
- 400 metres – 48.78 (Avezzano 2003)

Indoor

- 60 metres – 6.90 (Valencia 1998)
- 200 metres – 22.30 (Valencia 1998) NR
