= Montserrat Pujol (Andorran athlete) =

Andorran athlete

Personal information
- Full name: Montserrat Pujol Joval
- Born: 27 April 1979 (age 46) Andorra la Vella, Andorra

Sport
- Country: Andorra
- Sport: Athletics
- Event: 100 metres

Montserrat Pujol Joval (Note: In this Catalan name, the first or paternal surname is Pujol and the second or maternal family name is Joval; both are generally joined by the conjunction "i".) (born 27 April 1979 in Andorra la Vella) is a former track and field athlete who competed internationally for Andorra.

Pujol represented Andorra at the 2008 Summer Olympics in Beijing. She competed at the 100 metres sprint and placed seventh in her heat without advancing to the second round. She ran the distance in a time of 12.73 seconds.

== Major competitions record ==
Year	Competition	Venue	Position	Event	Notes
Representing Andorra
1997	Games of the Small States of Europe	Reykjavík, Iceland	3rd	Triple jump	11.49 (w)
1997	European Junior Championships	Ljubljana, Slovenia	–	Triple jump	NM
1998	European Indoor Championships	Valencia, Spain	11th	Long jump	5.44 m
1999	Games of the Small States of Europe	Schaan, Liechtenstein	3rd	Long jump	5.52 m
2001	Games of the Small States of Europe	Serravalle, San Marino	2nd	Long jump	5.65 m (w)
2001	Games of the Small States of Europe	Serravalle, San Marino	1st	Triple jump	11.57 m
2001	World Championships	Edmonton, Canada	47th (h)	100 m	13.38 s
2001	Mediterranean Games	Radès, Tunisia	11th	Long jump	5.42 m
2001	Mediterranean Games	Radès, Tunisia	10th	Triple jump	11.70 m
2003	Games of the Small States of Europe	Marsa, Malta	6th	Long jump	5.48 m
2003	Games of the Small States of Europe	Marsa, Malta	5th	Triple jump	11.72 m
2005	Games of the Small States of Europe	Andorra la Vella, Andorra	6th	4 × 100 m relay	51.17 s
2005	Games of the Small States of Europe	Andorra la Vella, Andorra	3rd	Long jump	5.75 m
2005	Games of the Small States of Europe	Andorra la Vella, Andorra	2nd	Triple jump	12.20 m
2005	World Championships	Helsinki, Finland	45th (h)	100 m	13.01 s
2006	World Indoor Championships	Moscow, Russia	32nd (h)	60 m	8.30 s
2007	Games of the Small States of Europe	Fontvieille, Monaco	3rd	Long jump	5.58 m
2007	Games of the Small States of Europe	Fontvieille, Monaco	4th	Triple jump	11.91 m
2008	Olympic Games	Beijing, China	67th (h)	100 m	12.73 s
2009	Games of the Small States of Europe	Nicosia, Cyprus	8th	Long jump	5.40 m
2009	Games of the Small States of Europe	Nicosia, Cyprus	6th	Triple jump	11.89 m
