= Carol Galea =

Maltese long-distance runner

Personal information
- Born: 24 October 1962 (age 63)
- Height: 1.56 m (5 ft 1 in)
- Weight: 44 kg (97 lb)

Sport
- Sport: Track and field
- Events: Marathon, half marathon
- Club: Zurrieq Wolves

Carol Galea (born 24 October 1962) is a retired Maltese long-distance runner. She represented her country at two Olympic Games, in 1992 and 1996, as well as the 1995 World Championships.

Galea still holds national records in multiple events.

== Competition record ==
Year	Competition	Venue	Position	Event	Notes
Representing Malta
1992	Olympic Games	Barcelona, Spain	–	800 m	DQ
1992	Olympic Games	Barcelona, Spain	33rd (h)	1500 m	4:33.41
1994	Commonwealth Games	Victoria, Canada	9th	Marathon	2:39:40
1995	Games of the Small States of Europe	Luxembourg City, Luxembourg	3rd	5000 m	16:47.30
1995	World Championships	Gothenburg, Sweden	31st (h)	10,000 m	35:30.84
1996	Olympic Games	Atlanta, United States	–	Marathon	DNF
1997	Games of the Small States of Europe	Reykjavík, Iceland	2nd	1500 m	4:49.83
1997	Games of the Small States of Europe	Reykjavík, Iceland	1st	5000 m	16:54.16
1997	Mediterranean Games	Bari, Italy	2nd	Marathon	2:43:53
1998	Commonwealth Games	Kuala Lumpur, Malaysia	–	Marathon	DNF
2001	Games of the Small States of Europe	Serravalle, San Marino	2nd	5000 m	17:07.30
2001	Games of the Small States of Europe	Serravalle, San Marino	2nd	10,000 m	34:55.78
2002	World Half Marathon Championships	Brussels, Belgium	59th	Half marathon	1:18:39
2002	Commonwealth Games	Manchester, United Kingdom	7th	Marathon	2:45:48
2003	Games of the Small States of Europe	Marsa, Malta	–	5000 m	DNF
2003	Games of the Small States of Europe	Marsa, Malta	1st	10,000 m	36:13.97
2005	Games of the Small States of Europe	Andorra la Vella, Andorra	2nd	5000 m	17:58.66
2005	Games of the Small States of Europe	Andorra la Vella, Andorra	1st	10,000 m	37:40.36
2005	Mediterranean Games	Almería, Spain	10th	Half marathon	1:21:04

== Personal bests ==
Outdoor

- 800 metres – 2:15.16 (Valletta 1993)
- 1500 metres – 4:33.41 (Barcelona 1992)
- 3000 metres – 9:39.97 (Dublin 1994)
- 5000 metres – 16:43.8 (Marsa 1995)
- 10,000 metres – 34:25.1 (Watford 1997)
- Half marathon – 1:17:52 (Palermo 2003)
- Marathon – 2:36:53 (Florence 1998)
