= Jordan Gusman =

Maltese middle-distance rynner

Personal information
- Nationality: Maltese
- Born: 30 January 1994 (age 31) Eastwood, New South Wales, Australia

Sport
- Sport: Men's athletics
- Event: 800 metres – Half marathon
- Club: Tinman Elite

Jordan Gusman (born 30 January 1994) is a Maltese middle and long-distance runner who won several medals for Malta at the Games of the Small States of Europe.

From Corindi Beach, Australia, he was eligible to represent Malta from 21 August 2019.

As an Australian, he won the 800 m at the 2012 Oceania Junior Athletics Championships.

Gusman won the 3000 m event establishing a Maltese national record at the 2021 European Athletics Team Championships (3rd League).

== Personal bests ==
- 800 metres – 1:48.65 (Canberra 2016)
- 1500 metres – 3:37.52 (Los Angeles 2018)
- Mile – 3:57.29 (Sydney 2017)
- 3000 metres – 7:50.57 (Memphis 2021) NR
  - 3000 metres indoor – 7:44.40 (Boston 2022) NR
- 5000 metres – 13:21.35 (Palo Alto 2019)
  - 5000 metres indoor – 13:24.05 (Boston 2022) NR
- 10,000 metres – 28:29.85 (Palo Alto 2023) NR

Road

- 5K – 13:54 (San José 2018)
- 10K – 28:39 (Burnie 2016)
- Half marathon – 1:03:41 (Houston 2023) NR
- Marathon – 2:13:13 (Chicago 2023) NR
