= Matthew Micallef St. John Athletics Stadium =

Multi-purpose stadium in Marsa, Malta

- Interactive map of Matthew Micallef St. John Athletics Stadium
- Former names: Marsa Stadium
- Location: Malta
- Coordinates: 35°52′31.6″N 14°29′37.4″E
- Owner: Government of Malta
- Operator: Malta Amateur Athletic Association
- Capacity: 2,500
- Surface: Grass

Tenant
- Athletics Malta

The Matthew Micallef St. John Athletics Stadium is a multi-purpose stadium situated in Marsa, Malta. The stadium seats 2,500 people and is the national athletics venue of Malta. It is operated by the Malta Amateur Athletic Association.

== Background and description ==
In December 2009, the Government of Malta leased the stadium to the Malta Amateur Athletic Association for a lease period of 49 years. The stadium is a multi-purpose facility, which includes an eight lane running track around the pitch. The facilities also comprise an uncovered stand, which holds up to 2,500 people, and a warm-up track behind the said stand. The warm-up track was inaugurated by the Association on 29 April 2016.

=== Marsa Sports Complex ===
The stadium makes part of the Marsa Sports Complex. The Complex hosts a number of sports facilities, including two full size football pitches, a rugby field, an archery range, a baseball/softball pitch, and outdoor basketball and netball courts. The Complex also comprises an 18-hole golf-course, tennis courts and a cricket pitch; these facilities are administered by the Marsa Sports and Country Club.

== Notable events ==
=== European Team Championships ===
The stadium hosted the Third League of the European Team Championships twice. Indeed, in 2010 Malta hosted the Third League of the 2010 European Team Championships for the first time whereas the most recent edition played out in Malta was the Third League of the 2017 European Team Championships.

=== Malta national football team ===
On 1 February 1983, the stadium, back then was known as the Marsa Stadium, hosted the Malta national football team for the first and only time since then. The match was a friendly against the Tunisia national football team. Malta broke the deadlock but eventually lost the encounter 2-1.

== See also ==
- List of football stadiums in Malta
