= Magnús Aron Hallgrímsson =

Icelandic discus thrower

Personal information
- Nationality: Icelandic
- Born: 23 March 1976 (age 50)

Sport
- Sport: Athletics
- Event: Discus throw

Magnús Aron Hallgrímsson (born 23 March 1976) is an Icelandic athlete. He competed in the men's discus throw at the 2000 Summer Olympics.
