= Marilia Gregoriou =

Cypriot sprinter (born 1980)

Personal information
- Nationality: Cypriot
- Born: 13 February 1980 (age 46)

Sport
- Sport: Sprinting
- Event: 200 metres

Marilia Gregoriou (Greek: Μαρίλια Γρηγορίου; born 13 February 1980) is a Cypriot sprinter. She competed in the women's 200 metres at the 2004 Summer Olympics.
