= Androula Sialou =

Cypriot hurdler (born 1973)

Androula Sialou (Greek: Ανδρούλα Σιάλου; born 27 January 1973) is a retired Cypriot athlete who specialised in the 400 metres hurdles. She represented her country at the 2004 Summer Olympics reaching the semifinals. She is the Cypriot national record holder for the event with her personal best of 54.76 seconds.

== Competition record ==
| Year | Competition | Venue | Position | Event | Notes |
Representing Cyprus
| 1989 | Games of the Small States of Europe | Nicosia, Cyprus | 3rd | 400 m | 56.84 |
| 1991 | Games of the Small States of Europe | Andorra la Vella, Andorra | 2nd | 400 m | 56.62 |
| 1991 | European Junior Championships | Thessaloniki, Greece | 11th (h) | 400 m hurdles | 60.82 |
| 1993 | Games of the Small States of Europe | Valletta, Malta | 2nd | 400 m | 56.82 |
| 1993 | Games of the Small States of Europe | Valletta, Malta | 1st | 4 × 400 m relay | 3:52.62 |
| 1993 | Mediterranean Games | Narbonne, France | 7th | 400 m hurdles | 61.21 |
| 1993 | Mediterranean Games | Narbonne, France | 4th | 4 × 100 m relay | 48.27 |
| 2001 | Games of the Small States of Europe | Serravalle, San Marino | 1st | 400 m | 55.11 |
| 2001 | Games of the Small States of Europe | Serravalle, San Marino | 1st | 4 × 400 m relay | 3:45.34 |
| 2001 | Mediterranean Games | Radès, Tunisia | 4th | 400 m hurdles | 58.18 |
| 2001 | Mediterranean Games | Radès, Tunisia | 5th | 4 × 400 m relay | 3:43.20 |
| 2002 | European Indoor Championships | Vienna, Austria | 10th (h) | 400 m | 54.27 |
| 2003 | World Championships | Paris, France | 18th (h) | 400 m hurdles | 56.11 |
| 2004 | World Indoor Championships | Budapest, Hungary | 14th (h) | 400 m | 53.62 |
| 2004 | Olympic Games | Athens, Greece | 16th (sf) | 400 m hurdles | 65.72 |
| 2006 | Commonwealth Games | Melbourne, Australia | 7th (h) | 400 m hurdles | 57.30 |
| 2006 | European Championships | Gothenburg, Sweden | 10th (sf) | 400 m hurdles | 55.75 |

== Personal bests ==
Outdoor

- 400 metres – 52.30 (Kalamata 2003)
- 400 metres hurdles – 54.76 (Irakleio 2004) NR

Indoor

- 200 metres – 23.96 (Piraeus 2002) NR
- 400 metres – 52.91 (Peania 2004) NR
