= Víctor Martínez (runner) =

Andorran middle-distance runner

Personal information
- Born: 1 June 1975 (age 50)

Sport
- Sport: Athletics
- Event(s): 800 m, 1500 m

Víctor Manuel Martínez (born 1 June 1975) is an Andorran former middle-distance runner. He represented his country at three World Championships. In addition, he won multiple medals at the Games of the Small States of Europe.

== International competitions ==
Year	Competition	Venue	Position	Event	Notes
Representing Andorra
1997	Games of the Small States of Europe	Reykjavík, Iceland	1st	1500 m	4:22.08
1998	European Championships	Budapest, Hungary	33rd (h)	800 m	1:50.54
1999	Games of the Small States of Europe	Schaan, Liechtenstein	1st	800 m	1:49.94
1999	Games of the Small States of Europe	Schaan, Liechtenstein	1st	1500 m	3:49.02
1999	World Championships	Seville, Spain	44th (h)	800 m	1:48.73
2001	Games of the Small States of Europe	Serravalle, San Marino	1st	800 m	1:51.22
2001	Games of the Small States of Europe	Serravalle, San Marino	1st	1500 m	3:53.51
2001	World Championships	Edmonton, Canada	33rd (h)	1500 m	3:52.29
2003	Games of the Small States of Europe	Marsa, Malta	3rd	800 m	1:52.66
2003	Games of the Small States of Europe	Marsa, Malta	3rd	1500 m	3:51.19
2005	Games of the Small States of Europe	Andorra la Vella, Andorra	2nd	800 m	1:55.40
2005	Games of the Small States of Europe	Andorra la Vella, Andorra	1st	1500 m	3:58.01
2006	Ibero-American Championships	Ponce, Puerto Rico	14th (h)	800 m	1:53.88
2006	Ibero-American Championships	Ponce, Puerto Rico	15th	1500 m	3:56.35
2007	Games of the Small States of Europe	Fontvieille, Monaco	2nd	800 m	1:52.37
2007	Games of the Small States of Europe	Fontvieille, Monaco	4th	1500 m	3:55.15
2009	World Championships	Berlin, Germany	49th (h)	1500 m	4:02.10

== Personal bests ==
Outdoor

- 400 metres – 55.08 (Marsa 2010)
- 800 metres – 1:48.69 (Mataró 1999)
- 1500 metres – 3:43.89 (Cottbus 2001)
- One mile – 4:04.0 (Pamplona 2004)
- 10 kilometres – 32:04 (Andorra La Vella 2009)
