= Serge Müller =

Swiss footballer

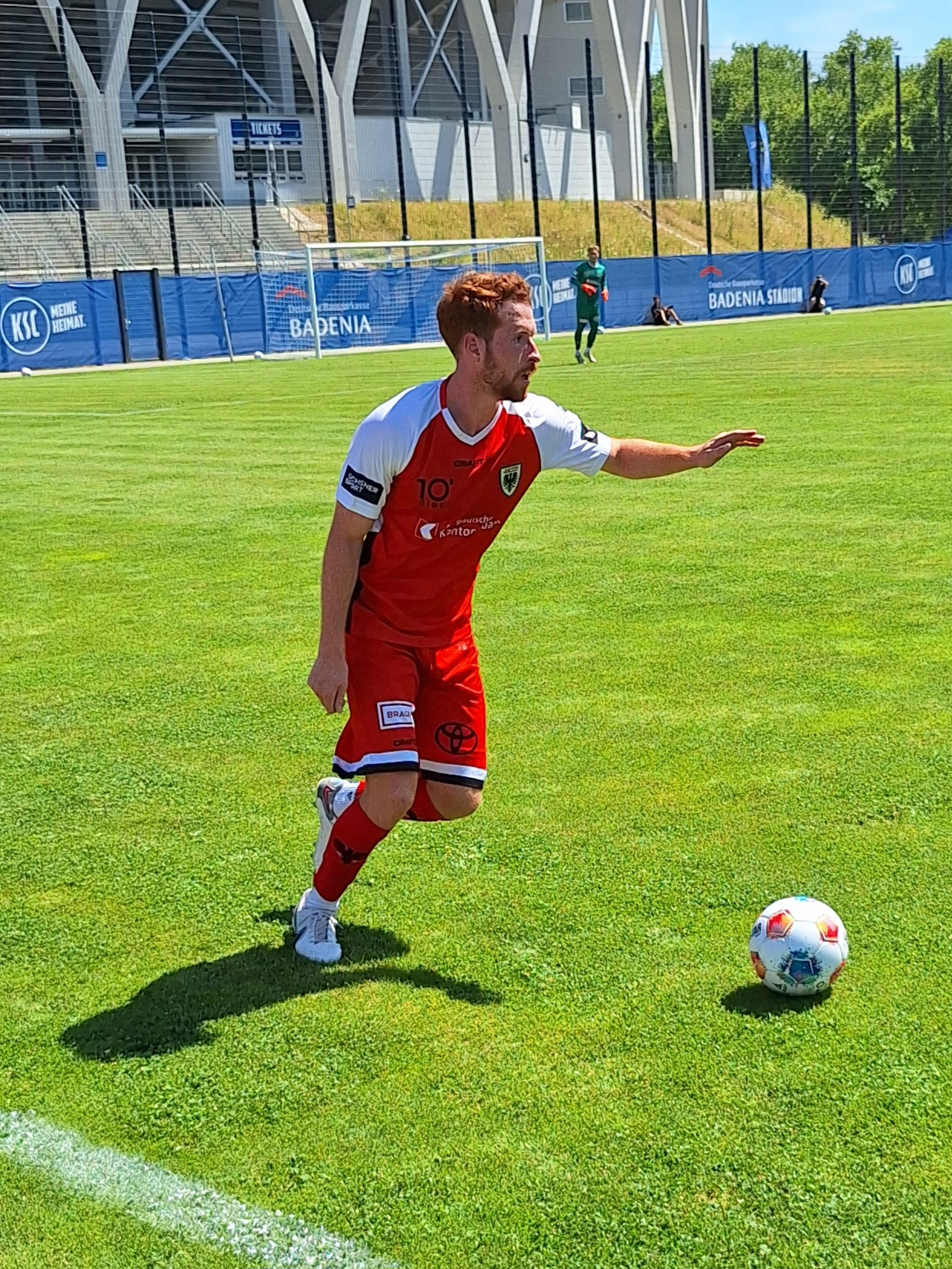

Personal information
- Full name: Serge Noah Müller
- Date of birth: 18 September 2000 (age 26)
- Place of birth: Zürich, Switzerland
- Height: 1.86 m (6 ft 1 in)
- Position: Defender

Team information
- Current team: FC Aarau
- Number: 15

Senior career*
Years	Team	Apps	(Gls)
2017–2019	Grasshoppers	0	(0)
2019–2023	FC Schaffhausen	133	(13)
2023–2024	SC Freiburg II	28	(0)
2024–	FC Aarau	78	(7)
- * Club domestic league appearances and goals as of 28 September 2026

Serge Noah Müller (born 18 September 2000) is a Swiss professional footballer who plays as a defender for Swiss Challenge League club FC Aarau.

== Early life ==
Müller is a native of Zürich, Switzerland and joined the youth academy of Swiss side Grasshoppers as a youth player.

== Club career ==
In 2019, Müller signed for Swiss second-tier side FC Schaffhausen, where he was regarded as one of the club's most important defenders and penalty-taker, and was described as a club "legend". He also captained the team.

On 15 July 2023, Müller signed with German 3. Liga side SC Freiburg II.

In June 2024, Müller joined Swiss Challenge League club FC Aarau on a three-year deal.

== International career ==
Müller has been called up to represent Switzerland internationally at youth level.

== Style of play ==
Müller mainly operates as a central defender.
