= Stathis Stasi =

Cypriot middle-distance runner (born 1973)

Personal information
- Nationality: Cypriot
- Born: 19 April 1973 (age 53) Pissouri, Cyprus

Sport
- Sport: Middle-distance running
- Event: Steeplechase

Stathis Stasi (Greek: Στάθης Στάση; born 19 April 1973) is a Cypriot middle-distance runner. He competed in the men's 3000 metres steeplechase at the 2000 Summer Olympics.
