= Elli Evangelidou =

Cypriot shot putter (born 1968)

Personal information
- Nationality: Cypriot
- Born: 7 May 1968 (age 58)

Sport
- Sport: Athletics
- Event: Shot put

Elli Evangelidou (Greek: Έλλη Ευαγγελίδου; born 7 May 1968) is a Cypriot athlete. She competed in the women's shot put at the 1992 Summer Olympics.
