= Einar Karl Hjartarson =

Icelandic high jumper

Einar Karl Hjartarson (born 28 October 1980) is a retired Icelandic high jumper.

He won the 1997 European Youth Olympic Days, finished twelfth at the 1998 World Junior Championships, and won the 1999 and 2001 Games of the Small States of Europe (the latter in a championship record 2.25). He also competed at the 2000 European Indoor Championships and the 2001 World Championships without reaching the final.

His personal best is 2.28 metres (indoor), achieved in February 2001 in Reykjavík. This is the Icelandic record.
