= Stelios Kapsalis =

Greek footballer

Personal information
- Full name: Stylianos Kapsalis
- Date of birth: 23 November 1994 (age 31)
- Place of birth: Serres, Greece
- Height: 1.86 m (6 ft 1 in)
- Position: Centre-back

Team information
- Current team: Apollon Kalythies

Youth career
- –2012: Panserraikos

Senior career*
Years	Team	Apps	(Gls)
2012–2017	Panserraikos	55	(3)
2017–2018	Veria	14	(0)
2018–2020	Doxa Drama	43	(2)
2020–2022	Rodos	16	(0)
2022–2023	Iraklis Larissa	10	(0)
2023	Veria	5	(0)
2023–2024	Rodos		
2024–	Apollon Kalythies		
- * Club domestic league appearances and goals as of 16 June 2023

Stelios Kapsalis (Greek: Στέλιος Καψάλης; born 23 November 1994) is a Greek professional footballer who plays as a centre-back for Gamma Ethniki club Apollon Kalythies.

== Personal life ==
Kapsalis hails from Nea Tyroloi, Serres.

== Honours ==
Panserraikos

- Gamma Ethniki: 2014–15
