= Eggert Bogason =

Icelandic discus thrower

Personal information
- Nationality: Icelandic
- Born: 19 July 1960 (age 65)

Sport
- Sport: Athletics
- Event: Discus throw

Eggert Bogason (born 19 July 1960) is an Icelandic athlete. He competed in the men's discus throw at the 1988 Summer Olympics.
