= Anthimos Rotos =

Cypriot sprinter (born 1977)

Personal information
- Nationality: Cypriot
- Born: 7 May 1977 (age 49)

Sport
- Sport: Sprinting
- Event: 4 × 100 metres relay

Anthimos Rotos (Greek: Άνθιμος Ρώτος; born 7 May 1977) is a Cypriot sprinter. He competed in the men's 4 × 100 metres relay at the 2000 Summer Olympics.
