= Konstantinos Pochanis =

Cypriot hurdler (born 1973)

Personal information
- Born: 29 July 1973 (age 53)

Sport
- Sport: Track and field

Konstantinos "Kostas" Pochanis (Greek: Κωνσταντίνος Ποχάνης; born 29 July 1973) is a retired Cypriot athlete who specialised in the 400 metres hurdles. He represented his country at the 2000 Summer Olympics, as well as two World Championships.

His personal best in the event is 49.88 seconds, set in 1999. He also ran personal best of 47.78 in the 400 metres (2001).

== Competition record ==
Year	Competition	Venue	Position	Event	Notes
Representing Cyprus
1990	World Junior Championships	Plovdiv, Bulgaria	26th (h)	400 m hurdles	53.93
1991	Mediterranean Games	Athens, Greece	6th	4 × 100 m relay	41.21
1991	European Junior Championships	Thessaloniki, Greece	12th (h)	400 m hurdles	52.92
1992	World Junior Championships	Seoul, South Korea	7th (sf)	400 m hurdles	51.85
1993	Games of the Small States of Europe	Valletta, Malta	2nd	400 m	48.81
1993	Games of the Small States of Europe	Valletta, Malta	1st	4 × 400 m relay	3:16.62
1993	Mediterranean Games	Narbonne, France	6th	4 × 100 m relay	40.57
1993	Mediterranean Games	Narbonne, France	5th	4 × 400 m relay	3:14.45
1993	World Championships	Stuttgart, Germany	36th (h)	400 m hurdles	50.77
1994	European Championships	Helsinki, Finland	37th (h)	400 m hurdles	52.07
1994	Commonwealth Games	Victoria, Canada	13th (h)	400 m hurdles	51.78
1995	Games of the Small States of Europe	Luxembourg City, Luxembourg	2nd	400 m	49.35
1999	Games of the Small States of Europe	Schaan, Liechtenstein	1st	400 m hurdles	50.28
1999	Universiade	Palma de Mallorca, Spain	11th (sf)	400 m hurdles	49.88
1999	World Championships	Seville, Spain	–	400 m hurdles	DNF
2000	Olympic Games	Sydney, Australia	41st (h)	400 m hurdles	51.20
2001	Games of the Small States of Europe	Serravalle, San Marino	1st	400 m hurdles	51.4
2001	Mediterranean Games	Radès, Tunisia	8th	400 m hurdles	51.56
2007	Games of the Small States of Europe	Fontvieille, Monaco	2nd	400 m hurdles	53.87
