= Suzanne Spiteri =

Maltese athlete

Personal information
- Nationality: Maltese
- Born: 31 October 1978 (age 46)

Sport
- Sport: Sprinting
- Event: 100 metres

Suzanne Spiteri (born 31 October 1978) is a Maltese sprinter. She competed in the women's 100 metres at the 2000 Summer Olympics.
