= Tanya Blake =

Maltese middle-distance runner

Personal information
- Nationality: British/Maltese
- Born: 16 January 1971 (age 55) Newham, London, England
- Height: 1.67 m (5 ft 5 1/2 in)
- Weight: 58 kg (128 lb)

Sport
- Sport: Athletics
- Event: Middle-distance running
- Club: Zurrieq Wolves

Achievements and titles
- Personal bests: 800 m: 1:59.56 (2003); 1500 m: 4:29.01 (2003)

Tanya-Gee Blake (born 16 January 1971) is a Maltese-English retired middle-distance runner, who specialized in the 800 metres and competed at the 2004 Summer Olympics.

== Biography ==
Born in England to a Maltese mother and American father, Blake held dual citizenship to compete internationally and represented Malta. Blake competed for the Arkansas Razorbacks track and field team in the NCAA.

Blake finished second behind Diane Modahl in the 800 metres event at the 1998 AAA Championships. Blake recorded two more second place finishes behind Kelly Holmes at the 1999 AAA Championships and 2001 AAA Championships.

Blake set a historic milestone as the first Maltese athlete to break a two-minute barrier and a national record in the 800 metres at the 2003 Prefontaine Classic Grand Prix in Eugene, Oregon, United States, by registering her career best and an A-standard entry time of 1:59.56 it guaranteed her a spot on her adopted nation's team for the 2004 Summer Olympics in Athens. In the women's 800 metres at the Olympics, unable to repeat her form from the Grand Prix a year earlier, Blake posted outside her national record of 2:19.34 and failed to advance further into the semifinals, as she was the last runner to cross the finish line in heat six.

During her athletic career, Blake trained for the Zurrieq Wolves track and field team.
