= Anninos Marcoullides =

Cypriot sprinter

Personal information
- Born: 8 February 1971 (age 55) Limassol, Lemesos, Cyprus

Sport
- Sport: Track and field
Medal record
Representing Cyprus
Summer Universiade
Bronze medal – third place	1997 Catania	200m
Mediterranean Games
Gold medal – first place	2001 Tunis	200m
Silver medal – second place	1997 Bari	100m
Bronze medal – third place	2001 Tunis	100m
European Indoor Championships
Silver medal – second place	1998 Valencia	200m

Anninos Marcoullides (Greek: Άννινος Μαρκουλλίδης; born 8 February 1971) is a Cypriot retired sprinter who specialized in 100 and 200 metre races. He carried the flag for Cyprus at the opening ceremony of the 1996 Summer Olympics in Atlanta, Georgia.

Marcoullides competed from 1992 until 2004 and represented the island in four Olympic Games in Barcelona, Atlanta, Sydney and Athens. His best achievement was finishing in 15th place in the Atlanta 100 metres.

== International competitions ==
Year	Competition	Venue	Position	Event	Notes
Representing Cyprus
1989	Games of the Small States of Europe	Nicosia, Cyprus	1st	200 m	21.75
1990	World Junior Championships	Plovdiv, Bulgaria	39th (h)	100m	10.90 (wind: -0.2 m/s)
1990	World Junior Championships	Plovdiv, Bulgaria	25th (h)	200m	21.88 (wind: +0.6 m/s)
1990	European Championships	Split, Yugoslavia	18th (h)	200m	21.41 w (wind: +2.4 m/s)
1991	Games of the Small States of Europe	Andorra la Vella, Andorra	1st	200 m	21.05 (w)
1991	Games of the Small States of Europe	Andorra la Vella, Andorra	1st	400 m	47.27
1991	Games of the Small States of Europe	Andorra la Vella, Andorra	1st	4 × 100 m relay	40.80
1994	European Championships	Helsinki, Finland	12th (sf)	100m	10.53 (wind: +1.7 m/s)
1994	European Championships	Helsinki, Finland	12th (sf)	200m	21.06 (wind: +1.7 m/s)
1997	Universiade	Catania, Italy	3rd	200 m	20.72
1997	Mediterranean Games	Bari, Italy	2nd	100 m	10.23
1998	European Indoor Championships	Valencia, Spain	2nd	200 m	20.65
1998	Commonwealth Games	Kuala Lumpur, Malaysia	4th	200 m	20.43
2001	Mediterranean Games	Tunis, Tunisia	3rd	100 m	10.21 w
2001	Mediterranean Games	Tunis, Tunisia	1st	200 m	20.60

== Personal bests ==
- 100 metres - 10.12 s (1998)
- 200 metres - 20.43 s (1998)
