= Deirdre Farrugia =

Maltese sprinter

Personal information
- Nationality: Maltese
- Born: 26 October 1972 (age 53)

Sport
- Sport: Sprinting
- Event: 100 metres

Deirdre Farrugia (née Caruana; born 26 October 1972) is a Maltese former sprinter. She competed in the women's 100 metres at the 1992 Summer Olympics. She was the 1988 Maltese Sportswoman of the Year.
