= Martha Ernstsdóttir =

Icelandic long-distance runner

Personal information
- Nationality: Icelandic
- Born: 22 December 1964 (age 61) Reykjavík, Iceland
- Height: 159 cm (5 ft 3 in)
- Weight: 46 kg (101 lb)

Sport
- Sport: Long-distance running
- Event: Marathon

Martha Ernstsdóttir (born 22 December 1964) is an Icelandic long-distance runner. She competed in the women's marathon at the 2000 Summer Olympics.

== Personal life ==
Martha is married to Jón Oddsson who was a member of both the Icelandic men's national football team and the Icelandic track and field national team. She is the aunt of middle-distance track athlete Aníta Hinriksdóttir.
