= List of Sammarinese records in athletics =

The following are the national records in athletics in San Marino maintained by its national athletics federation: Federazione Sammarinese Atletica Leggera (FSAL).

== Outdoor ==
Key to tables: Awaiting ratification Record not kept by FMA Not ratified or later rescinded by FSAL

=== Men ===
Event	Record	Athlete	Date	Meet	Place	Ref.
60 m	6.8	Cristian Forcellini	6 April 1995		San Marino	
100 m	10.41 (+1.2 m/s)	Francesco Sansovini	30 May 2023	Games of the Small States of Europe	Marsa, Malta	
100 m	10.3 h	Gian Nicola Berardi	28 April 2001		San Marino	
150 m	16.46	Francesco Molinari	7 April 2018		San Marino	
200 m	21.02	Aldo Canti	10 July 1991		Athens, Greece	
300 m	34.7	Marco Tamagnini	6 May 1990		Cesena, Italy	
400 m	47.67	Alessandro Gasperoni	1 June 2023	Games of the Small States of Europe	Marsa, Malta	
500 m	1:03.66	Ivano Bucci	10 April 2010		Reggiolo, Italy	
800 m	1:51.8	Manlio Molinari	25 June 1997		San Marino	
1000 m	2:30.9	Manlio Molinari	29 March 1989		Riccione, Italy	
1500 m	3:51.30	Joseph Guerra	2 June 2018		Nashville, United States	
Mile	4:30.6 h	Gian Luigi Macina	4 April 1998		San Marino	
2000 m	5:53.7 h	Matteo Zafferani	20 May 2000		San Marino	
3000 m	8:31.75 (Note: outdoor best, indoor mark ratified as absolute record)	Gian Luigi Macina	7 May 1995		Ravenna, Italy	
5000 m	14:43.5 h	Gian Luigi Macina	4 July 1996		Bologna, Italy	
10,000 m	30:45.4 h	Gian Luigi Macina	12 April 1992		Rubiera, Italy	
10 km (road)	32:54	Matteo Felici	15 November 2015		Santarcangelo di Romagna, Italy	
Half marathon	1:08:04	Gian Luigi Macina	20 March 1988		Ferrara, Italy	
Marathon	2:21:19	Gian Luigi Macina	27 October 1991		Carpi, Italy	
50 km (road)	6:21:18	Daniele Tonti	25 April 2013		Castel Bolognese, Italy	
100 km (road)	10:05:50	Alberto Zanchi	30 May 2015		Faenza, Italy	
110 m hurdles	16.18 (+0.6 m/s)	Simone Gorini	25 June 2025	European Team Championships	Maribor, Slovenia	
200 m hurdles	27.84	Marcello Carattoni	21 April 2012		San Marino	
400 m hurdles	52.12	Andrea Ercolani Volta	3 June 2023	Games of the Small States of Europe	Marsa, Malta	
2000 m steeplechase	6:25.0	Matteo Zafferani	13 April 1996		Modena, Italy	
3000 m steeplechase	9:25.85	Matteo Zafferani	8 July 1999		Bologna, Italy	
High jump	2.27 m	Eugenio Rossi	28 June 2015	Campionati di Società	Caprino Veronese, Italy	
Pole vault	4.50 m	Paolo Maiani	1 July 1989		Imola, Italy	
Long jump	7.25 m (+2.0 m/s)	Luca Maccapani	4 June 2009	Games of the Small States of Europe	Nicosia, Cyprus	
Triple jump	14.71 m (+2.0 m/s)	Federico Gorrieri	3 June 2003	Games of the Small States of Europe	Marsa, Malta	
Triple jump	14.71 m (−0.4 m/s)	Federico Gorrieri	22 June 2003		Århus, Denmark	
Shot put	13.56 m	Danilo Ranocchini	16 June 1975		San Marino	
Discus throw	38.52 m	Paolo Santagada	10 July 2002		Ancona, Italy	
Hammer throw	38.59 m	Massimo Meca	29 June 2003		Majano, Italy	
Javelin throw	73.31 m	Gabriele Mazza	26 June 2004		Rome, Italy	
Decathlon	4658 pts	Manuel Maiani	13–14 May 2000		Schio, Italy	
Decathlon	100m / Long jump / Shot put / High jump / 400m / 110m H / Discus / Pole vault / Javelin / 1500m; 12.86 / 5.30 m / 8.47 m / 1.60 m / 55.96 / 19.23 / 22.95 m / 3.10 m / 41.67 m / 4:34.14					
3 km walk (road)	12:50.0	Stefano Casali	22 June 1985		Castelfranco Emilia, Italy	
5 km walk (road)	21:57.9	Stefano Casali	19 May 1984		Forlì, Italy	
10 km walk (road)	43:50.5	Stefano Casali	5 May 1985		Modena, Italy	
20 km walk (road)	1:33:56 (Note: by World Athletics source, 1:33.55 by FSAL source)	Stefano Casali	14 April 1985		Ferrara, Italy	
50 km walk (road)	4:37:12	Stefano Casali	20 March 1994		Pescara, Italy	
4 × 100 m relay	40.99	Andorra; Francesco Molinari; Giammarco Gulini; Alessandro Gasperoni; Francesco Sansovini	31 May 2025	Games of the Small States of Europe	Andorra la Vella, Andorra	
4 × 200 m relay	1:41.87	A. Mularoni; Andrea Ercolani Volta; Marcello Carattoni; E. Fagioli	21 April 2012		San Marino	
4 × 400 m relay	3:17.44	San Marino; Dominique Canti; Manlio Molinari; Marco Tamagnini; Aldo Canti	25 May 1991	Games of the Small States of Europe	Andorra la Vella, Andorra	
4 × 1500 m relay	17:44	Olimpus San Marino; Gian Luigi Macina; Matteo Zafferani; Mauro Mancini; Manuel Maiani	21 April 1996		Fidenza, Italy	

=== Women ===
Event	Record	Athlete	Date	Meet	Place	Ref.
100 m	11.50 (+0.1 m/s)	Alessandra Gasparelli	24 June 2025	European Team Championships	Maribor, Slovenia	
150 m	17.60 (+1.3 m/s)	Alessandra Gasparelli	1 May 2024	Frate 150	Modena, Italy	
200 m	23.65 (+1.0 m/s)	Alessandra Gasparelli	5 May 2024	CDS Assoluto Emilia-Romagna	Modena, Italy	
400 m	58.23	Beatrice Berti	28 June 2023		Castelfranco Emilia, Italy	
600 m	1:46.2 h	Monica Randi	7 April 2001		San Marino	
800 m	2:08.66	Elisa Vagnini	25 May 1999		Vaduz, Liechtenstein	
1000 m	3:15.9 h	Roberta Ranocchini	1973		Ravenna, Italy	
1500 m	4:20.27	Elisa Vagnini	9 July 1998		Rome, Italy	
Mile	6:43.54	Paola Carinato	30 July 2017		Carate Brianza, Italy	
2000 m	7:41.30	Monica Randi	21 April 2012		San Marino	
3000 m	9:18.65	Elisa Vagnini	26 September 1999		Modena, Italy	
5000 m	16:50.34	Elisa Vagnini	18 September 1999		Bressanone, Italy	
10,000 m	38:33.51 (Note: ratified by FSAL but not recognised by World Athletics)	Stefania Casadei	26 April 2003		San Marino	
10,000 m	50:09.4 (Note: recognised by World Athletics)	Mona Bucci Fistrad	12 April 2003		San Marino	
10 km (road)	40:28	Monica Randi	18 November 2012		Santarcangelo di Romagna, Italy	
Half marathon	1:25:27	Monica Randi	7 March 1999		Ravenna, Italy	
Marathon	2:57:52 (Note: ratified by FSAL but not recognised by World Athletics)	Stefania Casadei	23 November 2003		Florence, Italy	
Marathon	3:10:00 (Note: recognised by World Athletics)	Amy Cesaretti	1 May 1983		Ravenna, Italy	
50 km (road)	4:43:04	Maria Giardi	25 April 2015		Castel Bolognese, Italy	
100 km (road)	10:34:54	Maria Giardi	10 April 2016		Seregno, Italy	
100 m hurdles	14.77	Barbara Rustignoli	6 June 2009	Games of the Small States of Europe	Nicosia, Cyprus	
100 m hurdles	14.59 (+0.5 m/s)	Alessandra Gasparelli	15 May 2021		Parma, Italy	
200 m hurdles	29.66	Alessandra Gasparelli	10 April 2021		Misano Adriatico, Italy	
400 m hurdles	1:02.03	Beatrice Berti	8 July 2021	European U23 Championships	Tallinn, Estonia	
3000 m steeplechase	13:52.80	Chiara Guiducci	24 June 2025	European Team Championships	Maribor, Slovenia	
High jump	1.76 m	Giuseppina Grassi	2 June 1974		San Marino	
Pole vault	3.50 m	Martina Muraccini	21 May 2017		Modena, Italy	
Long jump	5.69 m	Barbara Rustignoli	4 June 2009	Games of the Small States of Europe	Nicosia, Cyprus	
Triple jump	11.80 m	Greta San Martini	21 September 2024		Bologna, Italy	
Shot put	10.37 m	Barbara Rustignoli	9 May 2009		Modena, Italy	
Discus throw	37.08 m	Sara Andreani	8 July 2018		Imola, Italy	
Hammer throw	36.72 m	Cristina Zafferani	29 May 2004		Comacchio, Italy	
Javelin throw	35.44 m (Note: ratified by FSAL but not recognised by World Athletics)	Lidia Pelliccioni	19 April 1976		Spilamberto, Italy	
Javelin throw	34.41 m (Note: recognised by World Athletics)	Eleonora Rossi	3 June 2006		Florence, Italy	
Heptathlon	4713 pts	Barbara Rustignoli	9–10 May 2009		Modena, Italy	
Heptathlon	100m H / High jump / Shot put / 200m / Long jump / Javelin / 800m; 15.09 / 1.60 m / 10.37 m / 26.69 / 5.26 m / 30.12 m / 2:27.05					
20 km walk (road)						
20 km walk (road)						
4 × 100 m relay	47.57	San Marino; Rebecca Guidi; Greta San Martini; Noemi Cola; Alessandra Gasparelli	31 May 2025	Games of the Small States of Europe	Andorra la Vella, Andorra	
4 × 200 m relay	1:54.71	Olimpus San Marino; Biordi; Martina Pretelli; Martina Muraccini; Sara Maroncelli	21 April 2012		San Marino	
4 × 400 m relay	4:07.20	San Marino; Sofia Bucci; Beatrice Berti; Giulia Orsi; Martina Bollini	20 June 2021	European Team Championships	Limassol, Cyprus	

=== Mixed ===
Event	Record	Athlete	Date	Meet	Place	Ref.
4 × 400 m relay	3:43.50	San Marino; Andrea Ercolani Volta; Sofia Bucci; Alessandro Gasperoni; Chiara Casadei	22 June 2023	European Team Championships	Chorzów, Poland	

== Indoor ==
=== Men ===
Event	Record	Athlete	Date	Meet	Place	Ref.
60 m	6.68	Francesco Sansovini	21 January 2023		Ancona, Italy	
200 m	21.95 (Note: by World Athletics source; 21.92 by FSAL source)	Aldo Canti	29 February 1992		Genoa, Italy	
300 m	35.95	Manlio Molinari	6 January 1985		Ancona, Italy	
400 m	48.95	Probo Benvenuti	10 February 2024	Balkan Championships	Istanbul, Turkey	
800 m	1:54.6 h	Manlio Molinari	7 February 1987		Ancona, Italy	
1000 m	2:34.35	Joseph Guerra	19 January 2019		Westerville, United States	
1500 m	3:59.05	Gian Luigi Macina	25 January 1986		Ancona, Italy	
3000 m	8:39.89	Joseph Guerra	5 January 2018		Columbus, United States	
3000 m	8:29.61 OT	Joseph Guerra	10 February 2018		Geneva, United States	
60 m hurdles	9.22	Manlio Molinari	20 February 2000		Ancona, Italy	
High jump	2.24 m	Eugenio Rossi	16 February 2018	Italian Championships	Ancona, Italy	
Pole vault	3.30 m	Fabio Canini	6 January 2001		Ancona, Italy	
Pole vault	3.30 m	Manuel Maiani	6 January 2001		Ancona, Italy	
Pole vault	3.60 m	Massimo Piovaticci	9 January 2005		Modena, Italy	
Long jump	7.23 m	Luca Maccapani	25 January 2009		Ancona, Italy	
Triple jump	14.59 m	Federico Gorrieri	11 February 2007		Ancona, Italy	
Shot put	13.00 m	Paolo Santagada	26 January 2002		Ancona, Italy	
Heptathlon						
Heptathlon	60m / Long jump / Shot put / High jump / 60m H / Pole vault / 1000m					
3000 m walk	14:53.53	Fabio Bernardi	28 February 2009		Ancona, Italy	
5000 m walk	21:54.74	Stefano Casali	10 January 1987		Ancona, Italy	
4 × 200 m relay	1:30.72	Olimpus San Marino; Francesco Molinari; F. Maiani; Andrea Ercolani Volta; A. Gasperoni	6 March 2016		Ancona, Italy	
4 × 400 m relay						

=== Women ===
Event	Record	Athlete	Date	Meet	Place	Ref.
60 m	7.30	Alessandra Gasparelli	17 January 2026	5th Memorial Alessio Giovannini	Ancona, Italy	
200 m	23.87	Alessandra Gasparelli	10 January 2026	Meeting Nazionale Indoor #2	Ancona, Italy	
400 m	59.28	Beatrice Berti	30 January 2021		Padua, Italy	
800 m	2:14.92	Monica Randi	23 February 1997		Genoa, Italy	
1000 m	2:53.25	Elisa Vagnini	27 January 2001		Ancona, Italy	
1500 m	4:25.8 h	Elisa Vagnini	14 February 2000		Genoa, Italy	
3000 m	9:30.42	Elisa Vagnini	13 March 2000		Genoa, Italy	
60 m hurdles	9.10	Barbara Rustignoli	7 February 2009		Ancona, Italy	
High jump	1.73 m	Giuseppina Grassi	2 February 1975		Ancona, Italy	
Pole vault	3.60 m	Martina Muraccini	7 February 2021		Modena, Italy	
Long jump	5.84 m	Emma Corbelli	6 February 2021		Ancona, Italy	
Triple jump	11.74 m	Emma Corbelli	31 January 2021		Ancona, Italy	
Shot put	9.63 m	Rita Laurenco	21 January 1996		Ancona, Italy	
Pentathlon	3087 pts	Barbara Rustignoli	28 January 2006		Naples, Italy	
Pentathlon	60m H / High jump / Shot put / Long jump / 800m; 9.59 / 1.57 m / 9.11 m / 4.94 m / 2:39.31					
3000 m walk						
4 × 200 m relay	1:59.37	San Marino; Elisa Conti; Sara Pelliccioni; Lucia Gualandra; Cristina Marani	21 January 1996		Ancona, Italy	
4 × 400 m relay						
