= 2026 European Challenger Championships =

- Dates: 30 May
- Host city: Monaco
- Venue: Stade Louis II
- Level: Senior
- Events: 28
- Participation: 17 nations

The 2026 European Challenger Championships was the sixth edition of the biennial competition in outdoor athletics organised by the Athletic Association of Small States of Europe previously called Championships of the Small States of Europe. It was held on 30 May 2026 at the Stade Louis II in Monaco across 29 events.

== Medal summary ==
=== Men ===
Event	Gold		Silver		Bronze	
100 metres	Francesco Sansovini (SMR)	10.62	David Wallig (LUX)	10.73	Omar El Aida Chaffey (MLT)	10.74
200 metres	Graham Pellegrini (MLT)	21.37	Alex Beechey (CYP)	21.68	David Wallig (LUX)	21.70
400 metres	Franko Burraj (ALB)	46.45	Pavlos Nikolaou (CYP)	46.75	Ivan Galuşco (MDA)	47.40
800 metres	Jared Micallef (MLT)	1:48.65	Pol Moya (AND)	1:49.44	François Ducourant (MON)	1:50.14
1500 metres	Yervand Mkrtchyan (ARM)	3:42.75	Pol Moya (AND)	3:45.50	Matthew Azzopardi (MLT)	3:57.61
5000 metres	Yervand Mkrtchyan (ARM)	14:32.51	Gabriel Farrugia (MLT)	14:35.15	Gil Weicherding (LUX)	14:35.21
110 m hurdles (wind: +0.9 m/s)	Benjamin Salnitro (MLT)	14.52	Anastasios Vasileiou (CYP)	14.59	Ognen Stefanovski (MKD)	14.68
400 m hurdles	David Friederich (LUX)	53.47	Anastasios Vasileiou (CYP)	53.59	Jovan Stojoski (MKD)	53.80
1000 m medley relay	Moldova (MDA); Vadim Doscalov; Nichita Calinin; Chirill Grigorovschi; Ivan Galușco	1:52.65	Cyprus (CYP); Stavros Avgoustinou; Alexander Beechey; Anastasios Vasileiou; Pavlos Nikolaou	1:54.35	Luxembourg (LUX); Luc Dostert; Alan Jéhanno; David Wallig; Glenn Lassine	1:54.73
High jump	Charel Gaspar (LUX)	2.04	Till Joly (LUX)	2.00	Brajan Avia (MKD)	2.00
Pole vault	Jean Woloch (MON)	5.27	Andreas Kazamias (CYP)	5.12	Nikolai Bonello (MLT)	4.80
Long jump	Andreas Trajkovski (MKD)	7.62	Muhamet Cengeli (ALB)	7.46	Andreas Machallekides (CYP)	7.33
Shot put	Giorgi Mujaridze (GEO)	19.48	Alexandr Mazur (MDA)	19.40	Tomaš Đurović (MNE)	18.94
Javelin throw	Amir Papazi (MNE)	70.07	Andrian Mardare (MDA)	68.54	Garðar Atli Gestsson (ISL)	65.35

=== Women ===
Event	Gold		Silver		Bronze	
100 metres	Alessandra Gasparelli (SMR)	11.81	Lamiya Valiyeva (AZE); Christina Alba Marcus Hafliðadóttir (ISL)	11.91	Not awarded	
200 metres	Olivia Fotopoulou (CYP)	23.46	Alessandra Gasparelli (SMR)	24.04	Claire Azzopardi (MLT)	24.23
400 metres	Kalliopi Kountouri (CYP)	53.64	Mădălina Culea (MDA)	54.25	Ilaha Guliyeva (AZE)	54.64
800 metres	Stavri Filippou (CYP)	2:05.33	Gina McNamara (MLT)	2:07.15	Relaksa Dauti (ALB)	2:09.54
1500 metres	Vera Bertemes-Hoffmann (LUX)	4:14.86	Gresa Bakraci (KOS)	4:21.45	Andreea Stavila (MDA)	4:25.82
5000 metres	Kimberly Chinfatt (LUX)	16:39.85	Redia Dauti (ALB)	16:54.44	Ariadna Fenes (AND)	16:55.41
100 m hurdles (wind: +0.2 m/s)	Lui Lai Yiu (MON)	13.73	Ísold Sævarsdóttir (ISL)	14.09	María Rún Gunnlaugsdóttir (ISL)	14.19
400 m hurdles	Kalypso Stavrou (CYP)	59.47	Anna Berghii (MDA)	60.32	Marie Charlotte Gastaud (MON)	60.43
1000 m medley relay	Cyprus (CYP); Filippa Fotopoulou; Olivia Fotopoulou; Kalypso Stavrou; Kalliopi Kountouri	2:07.28	Malta (MLT); Claire Azzopardi; Thea Parnis; Charlotte Wingfiled; Martha Spiteri	2:10.24	Moldova (MDA); Iana Garaeva; Anastasia Seferianț; Anna Berghii; Mãdãlina Culea	2:12.38
High jump	Marija Vuković (MNE)	1.84	Styliana Ioannidou (CYP)	1.81	María Rún Gunnlaugsdóttir (ISL)	1.66
Pole vault	Andriana Panteli (CYP)	3.80	Sana Grillo (MLT)	3.40	Not awarded	
Long jump	Filippa Fotopoulou (CYP)	6.48	Mari Dzagnidze (GEO)	6.00	Anastasia Senchiv (MDA)	5.98
Shot put	Stéphanie Krumlovsky (LUX)	15.38	Sopo Shatirishvili (GEO)	14.66	Sakina Hajizade (AZE)	12.78
Javelin throw	Marija Bogavac (MNE)	51.91	Bryndís Embla Einarsdóttir (ISL)	51.28	Irenie Theodorou (CYP)	50.91

=== Medal table ===
* Host nation (Monaco)

Rank	Nation	Gold	Silver	Bronze	Total
1	Cyprus (CYP)	7	7	2	16
2	Luxembourg (LUX)	5	2	3	10
3	Malta (MLT)	3	4	4	11
4	Montenegro (MNE)	3	0	1	4
5	San Marino (SMR)	2	1	0	3
6	Monaco (MON)*	2	0	2	4
7	Armenia (ARM)	2	0	0	2
8	Moldova (MDA)	1	4	3	8
9	Albania (ALB)	1	2	1	4
10	Georgia (GEO)	1	2	0	3
11	North Macedonia (MKD)	1	0	3	4
12	Iceland (ISL)	0	3	3	6
13	Andorra (AND)	0	2	1	3
14	Azerbaijan (AZE)	0	1	3	4
15	Kosovo (KOS)	0	1	0	1
16	Gibraltar (GIB)	0	0	0	0
16	Vatican City (VAT)	0	0	0	0
Totals (17 entries)		28	29	26	83
