= Athletics at the 1985 Games of the Small States of Europe =

- Dates: 23–26 May
- Host city: Serravalle, San Marino
- Venue: Stadio Olimpico di San Marino
- Events: 20
- Participation: 72 athletes from 5 nations

Athletics at the 1985 Games of the Small States of Europe were held at the Stadio Olimpico in Serravalle, San Marino, between 23 and 26 May.

== Medal summary ==
=== Men ===
Event	Gold		Silver		Bronze	
100 metres (wind: NWI)	Aggelos Angelidis (CYP)	10.80	Nikos Hadjinikolaou (CYP)	10.83	Luc Kohnen (LUX)	11.19
200 metres (wind: NWI)	Aggelos Angelidis (CYP)	21.49	Eleftherios Kolokoudias (CYP)	21.94	Aðalsteinn Bernhardsson (ISL)	22.07
400 metres	Aðalsteinn Bernhardsson (ISL)	48.60	Marco Tamagnini (SMR)	50.18	Manlio Molinari (SMR)	51.26
800 metres	Philippos Stylianoudis (CYP)	1:52.05	Manlio Molinari (SMR)	1:53.69	Marc Schmiz (LUX)	1:54.15
1500 metres	Philippos Stylianoudis (CYP)	4:02.29	Gianluigi Macina (SMR)	4:07.86	Joan Marc Mason (AND)	4:08.74
10,000 metres	Filippos Filipou (CYP)	30:17.17	Jean-Claude Petit (LUX)	31:13.74	Marc Agosta (LUX)	31:30.57
110 metres hurdles (wind: NWI)	Petros Evripidou (CYP)	14.20	Gísli Sigurðsson (ISL)	14.83	Michalis Rodosthenous (CYP)	14.90
4×100 metres relay	Cyprus; Eleftherios Kolokoudias ? Nikos Hadjinikolaou; Aggelos Angelidis	41.08	Luxembourg; Pascal Husting; Marc Schmiz; Marc Savic; Bernard Felten	43.24	San Marino; Dominique Canti; Marco Tamagnini ? Luciano Scarponi	43.48
High jump	Alexis Neophytou (CYP)	2.09	Unnar Vilhjálmsson (ISL)	2.06	Jean-Claude Husting (LUX)	1.97
Long jump	Dimitrios Araouzos (CYP)	7.65	Michalis Rodosthenous (CYP)	7.20	Bernard Felten (LUX)	6.90
Shot put	Pétur Guðmundsson (ISL)	16.01	Danilo Ranocchini (SMR)	11.28	Bruno Romuald (SMR)	10.98

=== Women ===
Event	Gold		Silver		Bronze	
100 metres (wind: NWI)	Maroula Lambrou (CYP)	12.04	Josiane Reinesch (LUX)	12.26	Nicole Feitler (LUX)	12.54
200 metres (wind: NWI)	Josiane Reinesch (LUX)	24.55	Dora Kyriakou (CYP)	24.87	Oddný Arnadóttir (ISL)	25.18
400 metres	Dora Kyriakou (CYP)	55.45	Oddný Arnadóttir (ISL)	55.49	Giuseppina Grassi (SMR)	67.19
800 metres	Christiana Menelaou (CYP)	2:12.15	Mady Scholtes (LUX)	2:18.52	Nuria Cespedes (AND)	2:30.41
1500 metres	Daniele Kaber (LUX)	4:33.09	Christiane Wei (LUX)	4:46.09	Christiana Menelaou (CYP)	4:50.18
4×100 metres relay	Cyprus ? Dora Kyriakou; Myroula Kapitzi; Maroula Lambrou	48.26	Luxembourg; Véronique Linster; Josiane Reinesch; Veronique Feipel; Nicole Feitler	49.29	San Marino ? ? Giuseppina Grassi; Sara Rossini	53.18
High jump	Bryndís Hólm (ISL)	1.69	Giuseppina Grassi (SMR)	1.61	Pascale Schmoetten (SMR)	1.58
Long jump	Maroula Lambrou (CYP)	6.30	Myroula Kapitzi (CYP)	5.87	Bryndís Hólm (ISL)	5.76
Shot put	Soffía Gestsdottir (ISL)	12.54	Maro Thoma (CYP)	10.47	Gabriella Innocentini (SMR)	8.57

== Medal table ==
Rank	Nation	Gold	Silver	Bronze	Total
1	Cyprus	14	6	2	22
2	Iceland	4	3	3	10
3	Luxembourg	2	6	7	15
4	San Marino	0	5	6	11
5	Andorra	0	0	2	2
Totals (5 entries)		20	20	20	60
