= Athletics at the 1987 Games of the Small States of Europe =

- Dates: 14–17 May
- Host city: Monaco
- Venue: Stade Louis II
- Events: 19
- Participation: 120 athletes from 8 nations

Athletics at the 1987 Games of the Small States of Europe were held at the Stade Louis II in Monaco between 14 and 17 May.

== Medal summary ==
=== Men ===
Event	Gold		Silver		Bronze	
100 metres (wind: NWI)	Jean-Claude Gengler (LUX)	11.05			Markus Büchel (LIE)	11.08
200 metres (wind: NWI)	Aggelos Angelidis (CYP)	21.82			Jean-Claude Gengler (LUX)	22.65
400 metres	Aðalsteinn Bernhardsson (ISL)	49.22	Manlio Molinari (SMR)			
800 metres	Philippos Stylianoudis (CYP)	1:52.56			Leon Kemp (LUX)	1:54.30
1500 metres	Nikos Vassiliou (CYP)	3:51.22 CR			Francis Hoeser (LUX)	3:55.53
10,000 metres	Justin Gloden (LUX)	29:44.62 CR	Nikos Vassiliou (CYP)	29:59.03	Camille Schmit (LUX)	30:32.52
110 metres hurdles (wind: NWI)	Petros Evripidou (CYP)	14.45			Roger Mathekowitsch (LUX)	15.19
4×100 metres relay	Liechtenstein; Peter Nagele; Franz Brosi; Franz Tschol; Markus Büchel	42.41	Luxembourg; Jacques Sevenig; Jean-Claude Gengler; Luc Kohnen; Bernard Felten	42.62	San Marino	43.63
High jump	Antonis Stavrou (CYP)	2.09 =CR			Jean-Claude Husting (LUX)	2.03
Long jump	Dimitrios Araouzos (CYP)	7.27 CR			Franz Tschol (LIE)	6.60
Shot put	Pétur Guðmundsson (ISL)	18.53 CR			Guðni Sigurjónsson (ISL)	13.66
Javelin throw	Hristakis Telonis (CYP)	64.92			Germain Wolff (LUX)	59.88

=== Women ===
Event	Gold		Silver		Bronze	
100 metres (wind: NWI)	Georgia Paspali (CYP)	12.16	Josiane Reinesch (LUX)	12.21	Nicole Feitler (LUX)	12.30
200 metres (wind: NWI)	Josiane Reinesch (LUX)	25.10	Nicole Feitler (LUX)	25.35		
800 metres	Andrea Avraam (CYP)	2:11.28 CR	Christiana Menelaou (CYP)	2:11.83	Daniele Kaber (LUX)	2:13.73
100 metres hurdles (wind: NWI)	Manuela Marxer (LIE)	14.62	Disa Gísladóttir (ISL)	14.64	Giuseppina Grassi (SMR)	15.12
4×100 metres relay	Cyprus; Maria Eleftheriou ? ? Georgia Paspali	48.26	Luxembourg; Veronique Feipel; Josiane Reinesch; Daniele Konter; Nicole Feitler	49.29	San Marino; Chiara Albertini; Sara Rossini; Silvia Santini; Graziella Santini	53.18
High jump	Disa Gísladóttir (ISL)	1.86 CR			Giuseppina Grassi (SMR)	1.70
Long jump	Maria Eleftheriou (CYP)	5.95			Graziella Santini (SMR)	5.47

== Medal table ==
Rank	Nation	Gold	Silver	Bronze	Total
1	Cyprus	11	2	0	13
2	Luxembourg	3	4	9	16
3	Iceland	3	1	1	5
4	Liechtenstein	2	0	2	4
5	San Marino	0	1	5	6
Totals (5 entries)		19	8	17	44
