= Athletics at the 2023 Games of the Small States of Europe =

- Dates: 30 May – 3 June
- Host city: Marsa, Malta
- Venue: Matthew Micallef St. John Athletics Stadium
- Events: 34
- Participation: 174 athletes from 9 nations
- Records set: 21 GR

The athletics competition at the 2023 Games of the Small States of Europe was held at the Matthew Micallef St. John Athletics Stadium in Marsa, Malta on 31 May, 1 and 3 June 2023.

== Participating nations ==
- Andorra (18)
- Cyprus (40)
- Iceland (15)
- Liechtenstein (1)
- Luxembourg (19)
- Malta (36)
- Monaco (25)
- Montenegro (5)
- San Marino (15)

== Medal summary ==
=== Medal table ===
* Host nation (Malta)

Rank	Nation	Gold	Silver	Bronze	Total
1	Malta*	15	7	10	32
2	Cyprus	7	12	5	24
3	Luxembourg	3	7	4	14
4	Monaco	3	0	0	3
5	Andorra	2	5	4	11
6	San Marino	2	1	3	6
7	Iceland	1	1	5	7
8	Montenegro	1	1	1	3
9	Liechtenstein	0	0	1	1
Totals (9 entries)		34	34	33	101

=== Men ===
Event	Gold		Silver		Bronze	
100 m (wind: +1.2 m/s)	Francesco Sansovini; San Marino	10.41 NR	Stavros Avgoustinou; Cyprus	10.63	Beppe Grillo; Malta	10.66
200 m (wind: +1.3 m/s)	Graham Pellegrini; Malta	21.22	David Wallig; Luxembourg	21.28	Francesco Sansovini; San Marino	21.39
400 m	Téo Andant; Monaco	45.81; GR, PB	Graham Pellegrini; Malta	46.83 NR	Alessandro Gasperoni; San Marino	47.67 NR
800 m	Jared Micallef; Malta	1:50.22	Pol Moya; Andorra	1:50.37	Mathis Espagnet; Luxembourg	1:51.07
1500 m	Pol Moya; Andorra	3:41.10; GR NR	Charles Grethen; Luxembourg	3:42.37	Jared Micallef; Malta	3:44.48 NR
5000 m	Jordan Gusman; Malta	13:51.77; GR, SB	Nahuel Carabaña; Andorra	14:05.16; NR	Bob Bertemes; Luxembourg	14:05.16
10,000 m	Jordan Gusman; Malta	29:37.96; GR	Bob Bertemes; Luxembourg	30:35.81 PB	Dillon Cassar; Malta	30:37.83
110 m hurdles (wind: -0.5 m/s)	François Grailet; Luxembourg	14.33	Konstantinos Tziakouris; Cyprus	14.52	Christos Economides; Cyprus	14.63
400 m hurdles	Andrea Ercolani Volta; San Marino	52.12 NR	Ívar Kristinn Jasonarson; Iceland	52.17	David Friederich; Luxembourg	53.76
3000 m steeplechase	Nahuel Carabaña; Andorra	8:54.95	Gil Weicherding; Luxembourg	9:03.68	Luke Micallef; Malta	9:16.73
4 × 100 m relay	Malta; Beppe Grillo; Graham Pellegrini; Gaetano Di Franco; Luke Bezzina	40.59	San Marino	41.15 NR	Cyprus	41.19
4 × 400 m relay	Monaco; Karim Sfaxi; Giovanni Molino; Thomas Mironenko Durier; Téo Andant	3:12.42; GR	Cyprus	3:12.64	Iceland	3:18.76
Pole vault	Jean Woloch; Monaco	5.30 m	Christos Tamanis; Cyprus	5.20 m	Nikandros Stylianou; Cyprus	5.20 m
Long jump	Antreas Machallekidis; Cyprus	7.44 m	Jeremy Zammit; Malta	7.28 m	Ian Paul Grech; Malta	6.86 m
Triple jump	Armani James; Malta	14.49 m	Stavros Stavrou; Cyprus	14.05 m	Ian Paul Grech; Malta	13.93 m
Shot put	Bob Bertemes; Luxembourg	20.51 m	Tomaš Đurović; Montenegro	18.36 m	Risto Drobnjak; Montenegro	17.83 m
Discus throw	Danijel Furtula; Montenegro	62.79 m	Bob Bertemes; Luxembourg	59.16 m	Giorgos Koniarakis; Cyprus	56.44 m
Javelin throw	Örn Davíðsson; Iceland	71.69 m	Spyros Savva; Cyprus	66.20 m	Matthias Verling; Liechtenstein	64.87 m

=== Women ===
Event	Gold		Silver		Bronze	
100 m (wind: +2.7 m/s)	Patrizia van der Weken; Luxembourg	11.11	Olivia Fotopoulou; Cyprus	11.36	Alessandra Gasparelli; San Marino	11.47
200 m (wind: +1.5 m/s)	Olivia Fotopoulou; Cyprus	22.99; GR	Carla Scicluna; Malta	23.74 NR	Janet Richard; Malta	24.08
400 m	Janet Richard; Malta	53.51	Kalliopi Kountouri; Cyprus	55.29	Rafaela Demetriou; Cyprus	55.99
800 m	Gina McNamara; Malta	2:12.46	Charline Mathias; Luxembourg	2:12.89	Clare McNamara; Malta	2:16.92
1500 m	Gina McNamara; Malta	4:36.81	Mireya Bugeja; Malta	4:43.71	Aina Cinca; Andorra	4:49.43
5000 m	Gina McNamara; Malta	17:11.32	Lisa Bezzina; Malta	17:13.93	Dayane Huerta; Andorra	18.35.11
10,000 m	Lisa Bezzina; Malta	35:27.43	Ariadna Fenes; Andorra	35:41.96	Íris Skúladóttir; Iceland	36:00.19
100 m hurdles (wind: +0.2 m/s)	Natalia Christofi; Cyprus	13.01; GR NR	Victoria Rausch; Luxembourg	13.55	Lerato Pagè; Andorra	14.04
400 m hurdles	Kalypso Stavrou; Cyprus	1:00.45	Duna Viñals; Andorra	1:00.60 NR	Ingibjörg Sigurðardóttir; Iceland	1:00.63
3000 m steeplechase	Chrystalla Chadjipolydorou; Cyprus	11:02.11; GR	Dayane Huerta; Andorra	11:25.11	Xènia Mourelo; Andorra	11:25.27
4 × 100 m relay	Malta	45.39	Cyprus	45.62	San Marino	48.45 NR
4 × 400 m relay	Cyprus	3:44.31 =GR	Malta	3:46.78	Iceland	3:51.76
Pole vault	Peppijna Dalli; Malta	3.65 m	Andrea Vasou; Cyprus	3.60 m	Sana Grillo; Malta	3.60 m
Long jump	Claire Azzopardi; Malta	6.14 m	Pentelitsa Charalambous; Cyprus	6.02 m	Birna Kristjánsdóttir; Iceland	5.95 m
Triple jump	Claire Azzopardi; Malta	12.95 m	Rebecca Sare'; Malta	12.66 m	Melody N'Da Koffi; Luxembourg	12.37 m
Hammer throw	Emilia Kolokotroni; Cyprus	63.17 m GR	Valentina Savva; Cyprus	62.97 m	Mireya Cassar; Malta	50.74 m

== Men's results ==
=== 100 metres ===
Heats – 30 May
Wind:
Heat 1: 0.0 m/s, Heat 2: +3.2 m/s

Rank	Heat	Name	Team	Time	Notes
1	2	Francesco Sansovini	San Marino	10.46	Q
2	2	Beppe Grillo	Malta	10.58	Q
3	2	Stavros Avgoustinou	Cyprus	10.64	q
4	1	Francesco Molinari	San Marino	10.81	Q
5	1	Kristófer Þorgrímsson	Iceland	10.92	Q
6	2	Pol Bidaine	Luxembourg	10.94	q
7	2	Guillem Arderiu	Andorra	10.95	q
8	1	Ioannis Andreou	Cyprus	10.97	q
9	1	Mikel de Sá	Andorra	11.29	
10	2	Robin Marbotte	Monaco	11.38	
11	1	Lionel Évora-Delgado	Luxembourg	11.46	
12	1	Thomas Caredda	Monaco	12.24	
	1	Luke Bezzina	Malta	DQ	

Final – 30 May

Wind: +1.2 m/s

Rank	Lane	Name	Team	Time	Notes
1st place, gold medalist(s)	6	Francesco Sansovini	San Marino	10.41	NR
2nd place, silver medalist(s)	7	Stavros Avgoustinou	Cyprus	10.63	
3rd place, bronze medalist(s)	5	Beppe Grillo	Malta	10.66	
4	4	Francesco Molinari	San Marino	10.76	
5	3	Kristófer Þorgrímsson	Iceland	10.78	
6	1	Ioannis Andreou	Cyprus	10.95	
7	8	Pol Bidaine	Luxembourg	10.98	
8	2	Guillem Arderiu	Andorra	11.04	

=== 200 metres ===
Heats – 1 June
Wind:
Heat 1: -1.9 m/s, Heat 2: -2.5 m/s

Rank	Heat	Name	Team	Time	Notes
1	2	Graham Pellegrini	Malta	21.36	Q
2	1	David Wallig	Luxembourg	21.64	Q
3	2	Francesco Sansovini	San Marino	21.66	Q
4	2	Alexander James Beechey	Cyprus	21.66	q
5	2	Kristófer Þorgrímsson	Iceland	21.75	q
6	1	Stavros Avgoustinou	Cyprus	21.80	Q
7	1	Beppe Grillo	Malta	21.92	q
8	2	Pol Bidaine	Luxembourg	22.10	q
9	1	Anthony Vilhjálmsson	Iceland	22.35	
10	1	Francesco Molinari	San Marino	22.41	
11	2	Thomas Mironenko	Monaco	22.59	
	1	Thomas Caredda	Monaco	DNS	

Final – 3 June

Wind: +1.3 m/s

Rank	Lane	Name	Team	Time	Notes
1st place, gold medalist(s)	5	Graham Pellegrini	Malta	21.22	
2nd place, silver medalist(s)	6	David Wallig	Luxembourg	21.28	
3rd place, bronze medalist(s)	4	Francesco Sansovini	San Marino	21.39	
4	3	Stavros Avgoustinou	Cyprus	21.42	
5	7	Alexander James Beechey	Cyprus	21.58	
6	2	Beppe Grillo	Malta	21.59	
7	8	Kristófer Þorgrímsson	Iceland	21.78	
8	1	Pol Bidaine	Luxembourg	22.24	

=== 400 metres ===
Heats – 30 May

Rank	Heat	Name	Team	Time	Notes
1	1	Téo Andant	Monaco	46.78	Q, GR
2	1	Graham Pellegrini	Malta	48.51	Q
3	2	Alessandro Gasperoni	San Marino	48.80	Q
4	2	Matthew Galea Soler	Malta	48.83	Q
5	2	Paisios Dimitriadis	Cyprus	48.90	q
6	2	Philippe Hilger	Luxembourg	48.94	q
7	1	Pavlos Nikolaou	Cyprus	49.03	q
8	2	Sæmundur Ólafsson	Iceland	49.37	q
9	1	Ívar Kristinn Jasonarson	Iceland	49.51	
10	1	Pau Blasi	Andorra	49.71	
11	2	Giovanni Molino	Monaco	49.82	
12	1	Probo Benvenuti	San Marino	50.22	

Final – 1 June

Rank	Lane	Name	Team	Time	Notes
1st place, gold medalist(s)	5	Téo Andant	Monaco	45.81	GR, PB
2nd place, silver medalist(s)	6	Graham Pellegrini	Malta	46.83	NR, NU20R
3rd place, bronze medalist(s)	4	Alessandro Gasperoni	San Marino	47.67	NR
4	7	Paisios Dimitriadis	Cyprus	47.90	
5	3	Matthew Galea Soler	Malta	48.31	
6	8	Philippe Hilger	Luxembourg	48.51	
7	1	Sæmundur Ólafsson	Iceland	48.77	
8	2	Pavlos Nikolaou	Cyprus	48.77	

=== 800 metres ===
30 May

Rank	Name	Team	Time	Notes
1st place, gold medalist(s)	Jared Micallef	Malta	1:50.22	
2nd place, silver medalist(s)	Pol Moya	Andorra	1:50.37	
3rd place, bronze medalist(s)	Mathis Espagnet	Luxembourg	1:51.07	
4	Stavros Spyrou	Cyprus	1:51.13	
5	Benjamin Micallef	Malta	1:52.68	
6	François Ducourant	Monaco	1:52.87	
7	Christos Dimitriou	Cyprus	1:52.92	
8	Jory Teixeira	Luxembourg	1:52.99	
9	Karim Sfaxi	Monaco	1:53.77	

=== 1500 metres ===
1 June

Rank	Name	Team	Time	Notes
1st place, gold medalist(s)	Pol Moya	Andorra	3:41.10	GR, NR
2nd place, silver medalist(s)	Charles Grethen	Luxembourg	3:42.37	
3rd place, bronze medalist(s)	Jared Micallef	Malta	3:44.48	NR
4	Andrea Gacumi Michara	Cyprus	3:51.99	
5	Christos Dimitriou	Cyprus	3:54.26	
6	Jory Teixeira	Luxembourg	3:55.06	
7	Jean Paul Debono	Malta	4:04.80	
8	Louis Catteau	Monaco	4:07.00	

=== 5000 metres ===
3 June

Rank	Name	Team	Time	Notes
1st place, gold medalist(s)	Jordan Gusman	Malta	13:51.77	GR
2nd place, silver medalist(s)	Nahuel Carabaña	Andorra	14:05.16	NR
3rd place, bronze medalist(s)	Bob Bertemes	Luxembourg	14:28.91	
4	Quentin Succo	Monaco	14:40.25	
5	Gil Weicherding	Luxembourg	14:40.97	
6	Carles Gómez	Andorra	14:49.04	
7	Kais Adli	Monaco	14:58.98	
8	Simon Spiteri	Malta	14:58.99	

=== 10,000 metres ===
30 May

Rank	Name	Team	Time	Notes
1st place, gold medalist(s)	Jordan Gusman	Malta	29:37.96	GR
2nd place, silver medalist(s)	Bob Bertemes	Luxembourg	30:35.81	
3rd place, bronze medalist(s)	Dillon Cassar	Malta	30:37.83	
4	Yonas Kinde	Luxembourg	30:58.27	
5	Arnar Pétursson	Iceland	31:22.41	
6	Quentin Succo	Monaco	31:38.26	
7	Lorenzo Bugli	San Marino	32:12.91	
8	Damien Lagoutte	Monaco	32:59.18	

=== 110 metres hurdles ===
Heats – 1 June
Wind:
Heat 1: -1.8 m/s, Heat 2: +0.3 m/s

Rank	Heat	Name	Team	Time	Notes
1	1	François Grailet	Luxembourg	14.62	Q
2	2	Konstantinos Tziakouris	Cyprus	14.87	Q
3	2	Isak Traustason	Iceland	14.94	Q
4	1	Daniel Saliba	Malta	15.04	Q
3	1	Christos Economides	Cyprus	15.13	q
6	2	Darko Pešić	Montenegro	15.34	q
7	2	Jason Malgherini	Monaco	15.53	q
8	1	Axel Remy	Monaco	15.95	q
9	1	Pol Herreros	Andorra	16.03	

Final – 1 June
Wind:
-0.5 m/s

Rank	Lane	Name	Team	Time	Notes
1st place, gold medalist(s)	4	François Grailet	Luxembourg	14.33	
2nd place, silver medalist(s)	5	Konstantinos Tziakouris	Cyprus	14.52	
3rd place, bronze medalist(s)	7	Christos Economides	Cyprus	14.63	
4	8	Darko Pešić	Montenegro	14.73	
5	3	Daniel Saliba	Malta	15.20	
6	6	Isak Traustason	Iceland	15.40	
7	1	Axel Remy	Monaco	15.61	
8	2	Jason Malgherini	Monaco	18.38	

=== 400 metres hurdles ===
3 June

Rank	Lane	Name	Team	Time	Notes
1st place, gold medalist(s)	5	Andrea Ercolani Volta	San Marino	52.12	NR
2nd place, silver medalist(s)	4	Ívar Kristinn Jasonarson	Iceland	52.17	
3rd place, bronze medalist(s)	7	David Friederich	Luxembourg	53.76	
4	3	Andreas Gerogiou	Cyprus	55.92	
5	8	Eloi Vilella	Andorra	55.97	
	6	Anastasios Vasileiou	Cyprus	DNF	

=== 3000 metres steeplechase ===
1 June

Rank	Name	Team	Time	Notes
1st place, gold medalist(s)	Nahuel Carabaña	Andorra	8:54.95	
2nd place, silver medalist(s)	Gil Weicherding	Luxembourg	9:03.68	
3rd place, bronze medalist(s)	Luke Micallef	Malta	9:16.73	
4	Dario Mangion	Malta	9:31.07	
5	Gregory Giuffra	Monaco	9:38.38	
6	Jamal Baaziz	Monaco	9:56.52	
	Nikolas Fragkou	Cyprus	DNS	

=== 4 × 100 meters relay ===
3 June

Rank	Lane	Nation	Competitors	Time	Notes
1st place, gold medalist(s)	7	Malta	Beppe Grillo, Graham Pellegrini, Gaetano Di Franco, Luke Bezzina	40.59	
2nd place, silver medalist(s)	3	San Marino	Santos Nicolas Bollini, Alessandro Gasperoni, Francesco Molinari, Francesco Sansovini	41.15	
3rd place, bronze medalist(s)	4	Cyprus	Alexander James Beechey, Stavros Avgoustinou, Paisios Dimitriadis, Vasilis Varnava	41.19	
4	6	Iceland	Isak Traustason, Anthony Vilhjálmsson, Sæmundur Ólafsson, Kristófer Þorgrímsson	41.55	
5	8	Andorra	Guillem Arderiu, Mikel de Sa, Pau Blasi, Miquel Vilchez	42.51	NR
6	5	Monaco	Axel Remy, Jason Malgherini, Robin Marbotte, Jean Woloch	42.87	

=== 4 × 400 meters relay ===
3 June

Rank	Lane	Nation	Competitors	Time	Notes
1st place, gold medalist(s)	7	Monaco	Karim Sfaxi, Giovanni Molino, Thomas Mironenko, Téo Andant	3:12.42	GR
2nd place, silver medalist(s)	3	Cyprus	Pavlos Nikolaou, Andreas Demetriades, Paisios Dimitriadis, Stavros Spyrou	3:12.64	
3rd place, bronze medalist(s)	5	Iceland	Ívar Kristinn Jasonarson, Anthony Vilhjálmsson, Isak Traustason, Sæmundur Ólafsson	3:18.76	
4	4	Luxembourg	David Friederich, Mathis Espagnet, Philippe Hilger, Jory Teixeira	3:19.05	
5	6	San Marino	Probo Benvenuti, Andrea Ercolani Volta, Davide Davosi, Alessandro Gasperoni	3:19.96	
6	8	Malta	Matthew Galea Soler, Benjamin Micallef, Jared Micallef, Graham Pellegrini	3:24.67	

=== Pole vault ===
1 June

Rank	Name	Team	4.20	4.40	4.50	4.60	4.75	4.80	4.85	5.20	5.25	5.30	5.35	5.40	Result	Notes
1st place, gold medalist(s)	Jean Woloch	Monaco	–	–	–	–	–	o	–	xo	x–	o	–	xxx	5.30	
2nd place, silver medalist(s)	Christos Tamanis	Cyprus											x		5.20	
3rd place, bronze medalist(s)	Nikandros Stylianou	Cyprus	–	–	–	–	–	xo							5.20	
4	Miquel Vilchez	Andorra	–	o	–	xo	xxo	–	xxx						4.75	
5	Nikolai Bonello	Malta	o	xo	xxx										4.40	

=== Long jump ===
1 June

Rank	Name	Team	#1	#2	#3	#4	#5	#6	Result	Notes
1st place, gold medalist(s)	Andreas Machallekides	Cyprus	7.22	x	x	7.44	x	7.38	7.44	
2nd place, silver medalist(s)	Jeremy Zammit	Malta	–	–	6.73	6.70	x	7.28	7.28	
3rd place, bronze medalist(s)	Ian Paul Grech	Malta	x	6.47					6.86	
4	Loukas Simillides	Cyprus	6.51	x	x				6.74w	
5	Darko Pešić	Montenegro	x	6.59	x	–	6.44	x	6.59	

=== Triple jump ===
3 June

Rank	Name	Team	#1	#2	#3	#4	#5	#6	Result	Notes
1st place, gold medalist(s)	Armani James	Malta					14.49		14.49	
2nd place, silver medalist(s)	Stavros Stavrou	Cyprus							14.05	
3rd place, bronze medalist(s)	Ian Paul Grech	Malta							13.93	
4	Michalis Georgallettos	Cyprus							13.39	

=== Shot put ===
1 June

Rank	Name	Team	#1	#2	#3	#4	#5	#6	Result	Notes
1st place, gold medalist(s)	Bob Bertemes	Luxembourg							20.51	
2nd place, silver medalist(s)	Tomaš Đurović	Montenegro	16.99	17.65					18.36	
3rd place, bronze medalist(s)	Risto Drobnjak	Montenegro	16.64	17.83	x				17.83	
4	Petros Michaelides	Cyprus	16.57	x	x				16.57	
5	Sindri Lárusson	Iceland	15.83	16.21					16.42	
	Giorgos Koniarakis	Cyprus							DNS	

=== Discus throw ===
30 May

Rank	Name	Team	#1	#2	#3	#4	#5	#6	Result	Notes
1st place, gold medalist(s)	Danijel Furtula	Montenegro							62.79	
2nd place, silver medalist(s)	Bob Bertemes	Luxembourg							59.16	
3rd place, bronze medalist(s)	Giorgos Koniarakis	Cyprus							56.44	
4	Ingvi Karl Jónsson	Iceland	50.39						50.39	
5	Luke Farrugia	Malta							50.27	
6	Darko Pešić	Montenegro							47.47	

=== Javelin throw ===
3 June

Rank	Name	Team	#1	#2	#3	#4	#5	#6	Result	Notes
1st place, gold medalist(s)	Örn Davíðsson	Iceland						71.69	71.69	
2nd place, silver medalist(s)	Spyros Savva	Cyprus							66.20	
3rd place, bronze medalist(s)	Matthias Verling	Liechtenstein							64.87	
4	Amir Papazi	Montenegro							63.56	

== Women's results ==
=== 100 metres ===
Heats – 30 May
Wind:
Heat 1: -0.1 m/s, Heat 2: +1.4 m/s

Rank	Heat	Name	Team	Time	Notes
1	1	Patrizia van der Weken	Luxembourg	11.33	Q, GR
2	2	Olivia Fotopoulou	Cyprus	11.47	Q
3	2	Alessandra Gasparelli	San Marino	11.57	Q, NR, NU20R
4	1	Carla Scicluna	Malta	11.80	Q
5	1	Marianna Pisiara	Cyprus	11.90	q
6	2	Charlotte Wingfield	Malta	11.91	q
7	2	Victoria Rausch	Luxembourg	12.03	q
8	1	Charlotte Afriat	Monaco	12.89	q
9	1	Rebecca Guidi	San Marino	12.93	

Final – 30 May

Wind: +2.7 m/s

Rank	Lane	Name	Team	Time	Notes
1st place, gold medalist(s)	4	Patrizia van der Weken	Luxembourg	11.11	
2nd place, silver medalist(s)	5	Olivia Fotopoulou	Cyprus	11.36	
3rd place, bronze medalist(s)	6	Alessandra Gasparelli	San Marino	11.47	
4	3	Carla Scicluna	Malta	11.70	
5	8	Charlotte Wingfield	Malta	11.86	
6	7	Marianna Pisiara	Cyprus	11.88	
7	2	Victoria Rausch	Luxembourg	12.00	
8	1	Charlotte Afriat	Monaco	12.85	

=== 200 metres ===
3 June
Wind: +1.5 m/s

Rank	Lane	Name	Team	Time	Notes
1st place, gold medalist(s)	5	Olivia Fotopoulou	Cyprus	22.99	GR
2nd place, silver medalist(s)	4	Carla Scicluna	Malta	23.74	NR
3rd place, bronze medalist(s)	6	Janet Richard	Malta	24.08	
4	8	Marianna Pisiara	Cyprus	24.33	
5	7	Alessandra Gasparelli	San Marino	24.44	NR, NU20R
6	3	Yaraa Puraye	Luxembourg	26.02	

=== 400 metres ===
1 June

Rank	Lane	Name	Team	Time	Notes
1st place, gold medalist(s)	3	Janet Richard	Malta	53.51	
2nd place, silver medalist(s)	4	Kalliopi Kountouri	Cyprus	55.29	
3rd place, bronze medalist(s)	6	Rafaela Demetriou	Cyprus	55.99	
4	2	Tetiana Lagoutte Savluk	Monaco	57.22	
5	5	Kay Testa	Malta	57.51	
	1	Ingibjörg Sigurðardóttir	Iceland	57.59	
6	8	Jessica Woloch	Monaco	59.88	
7	7	Sofia Bucci	San Marino	1:01.15	

=== 800 metres ===
30 May

Rank	Name	Team	Time	Notes
1st place, gold medalist(s)	Gina McNamara	Malta	2:12.46	
2nd place, silver medalist(s)	Charline Mathias	Luxembourg	2:12.89	
3rd place, bronze medalist(s)	Clare McNamara	Malta	2:16.92	
4	Elin Sigurbjörnsdóttir	Iceland	2:17.18	

=== 1500 metres ===
1 June

Rank	Name	Team	Time	Notes
1st place, gold medalist(s)	Gina McNamara	Malta	4:36.81	
2nd place, silver medalist(s)	Mireya Bugeja	Malta	4:43.71	NU20R
3rd place, bronze medalist(s)	Aina Cinca	Andorra	4:49.43	
	Natalia Evangelidou	Cyprus	DNS	

=== 5000 metres ===
3 June

Rank	Name	Team	Time	Notes
1st place, gold medalist(s)	Gina McNamara	Malta	17:11.32	
2nd place, silver medalist(s)	Lisa Bezzina	Malta	17:13.93	
3rd place, bronze medalist(s)	Dayane Huerta	Andorra	18:35.11	
4	Maria Papanastasiou	Cyprus	18:36.24	
5	Claire Cammas	Monaco	18:40.04	

=== 10,000 metres ===
30 May

Rank	Name	Team	Time	Notes
1st place, gold medalist(s)	Lisa Bezzina	Malta	35:27.43	
2nd place, silver medalist(s)	Ariadna Fenes	Andorra	35:41.96	
3rd place, bronze medalist(s)	Íris Skúladóttir	Iceland	36:00.19	
4	Joelle Cortis	Malta	36:13.61	
5	Claire Cammas	Monaco	37:37.43	
6	Maria Papanastasiou	Cyprus	37:41.12	
	Jenny Gloden	Luxembourg	DNF	

=== 100 metres hurdles ===
1 June
Wind: +0.2 m/s

Rank	Lane	Name	Team	Time	Notes
1st place, gold medalist(s)	6	Natalia Christofi	Cyprus	13.01	GR, NR
2nd place, silver medalist(s)	5	Victoria Rausch	Luxembourg	13.55	
3rd place, bronze medalist(s)	4	Lerato Pages	Andorra	14.04	
4	7	Birna Kristín Kristjánsdóttir	Iceland	14.33	
5	2	Alba Viñals	Andorra	15.23	
	3	Glódis Edda Þuríðardóttir	Iceland	DNF	
	8	Malory Malgherini	Monaco	DNF	

=== 400 metres hurdles ===
3 June

Rank	Lane	Name	Team	Time	Notes
1st place, gold medalist(s)	3	Kalypso Stavrou	Cyprus	1:00.45	
2nd place, silver medalist(s)	4	Duna Viñals	Andorra	1:00.60	NR, NU20R
3rd place, bronze medalist(s)	7	Ingibjörg Sigurðardóttir	Iceland	1:00.60	
4	8	Marie-Charlotte Gastaud	Monaco	1:02.02	NR
5	6	Beatrice Berti	San Marino	1:02.36	
6	5	Chrystalla Lazarou	Cyprus	1:03.12	
7	2	Lise Boryna	Monaco	1:04.63	

=== 3000 metres steeplechase ===
1 June

Rank	Name	Team	Time	Notes
1st place, gold medalist(s)	Chrystalla Chatjipolydorou	Cyprus	11:02.11	GR
2nd place, silver medalist(s)	Dayane Huerta	Andorra	11:25.11	
3rd place, bronze medalist(s)	Xenia Mourelo	Andorra	11:25.27	
4	Rosalie Cauchi	Malta	11:37.79	

=== 4 × 100 meters relay ===
3 June

Rank	Lane	Nation	Competitors	Time	Notes
1st place, gold medalist(s)	5	Malta	Claire Azzopardi, Janet Richard, Carla Scicluna, Charlotte Wingfield	45.39	
2nd place, silver medalist(s)	6	Cyprus	Maria Antoniou, Olivia Fotopoulou, Marianna Pisiara, Pentelitsa Charalambous	45.62	
3rd place, bronze medalist(s)	4	San Marino	Emma Corbelli, Alessandra Gasparelli, Beatrice Berti, Sofia Bucci	48.45	NR

=== 4 × 400 meters relay ===
3 June

Rank	Lane	Nation	Competitors	Time	Notes
1st place, gold medalist(s)	6	Cyprus	Rafaela Demetriou, Chryso Georgiou, Kalypso Stavrou, Kalliopi Kountouri	3:44.31	=GR
2nd place, silver medalist(s)	3	Malta	Kay Testa, Gina McNamara, Josepha Micallef, Janet Richard	3:46.78	
3rd place, bronze medalist(s)	4	Iceland	Glódis Edda Þuríðardóttir, Þórdís Eva Steinsdóttir, Elin Sigurbjörnsdóttir, Ingibjörg Sigurðardóttir	3:51.76	
4	5	Monaco	Tetiana Lagoutte Savluk, Lise Boryna, Jessica Woloch, Marie-Charlotte Gastaud	3:52.33	
5	7	Andorra	Carlota Malaga, Maria Cristina Martins, Alba Viñals, Duna Viñals	3:55.31	

=== Pole vault ===
30 May

Rank	Name	Team	3.00	3.10	3.20	3.30	3.40	3.50	3.55	3.60	3.65	Result	Notes
1st place, gold medalist(s)	Peppyna Dalli	Malta	–	–	–	–	–	xxo				3.65	
2nd place, silver medalist(s)	Andrea Vasou	Cyprus	–	–	–	–	xo	o				3.60	
3rd place, bronze medalist(s)	Sana Grillo	Malta			–	–	o	xxo	o			3.60	
4	Stefania Serban	Monaco	–	–	o	–	o					3.50	
5	Martina Muraccini	San Marino	–	o	o	o	xo	xxx				3.40	
6	Eleonora Rossi	San Marino	o	xo	xo	xo	xxx					3.30	

=== Long jump ===
30 May

Rank	Name	Team	#1	#2	#3	#4	#5	#6	Result	Notes
1st place, gold medalist(s)	Claire Azzopardi	Malta	x	6.12	5.94	6.14	x	–	6.14	
2nd place, silver medalist(s)	Pantelitsa Charalampous	Cyprus							6.02	
3rd place, bronze medalist(s)	Birna Kristín Kristjánsdóttir	Iceland	5.87	x	5.95	x	x	5.84	5.95	
4	Rachela Pace	Malta	5.59	5.65	x				5.65	

=== Triple jump ===
1 June

Rank	Name	Team	#1	#2	#3	#4	#5	#6	Result	Notes
1st place, gold medalist(s)	Claire Azzopardi	Malta							12.95	
2nd place, silver medalist(s)	Rebecca Saré	Malta							12.66	
3rd place, bronze medalist(s)	Melody N'Da Koffi	Luxembourg							12.37	
4	Olivia Vild	Monaco							12.29	
5	Nikoletta Chrysanthou	Cyprus							12.09	
6	Christonimfi Pediou	Cyprus							11.86	
7	Emma Corbelli	San Marino							11.21	

=== Hammer throw ===
1 June

Rank	Name	Team	#1	#2	#3	#4	#5	#6	Result	Notes
1st place, gold medalist(s)	Emilia Kolokotroni	Cyprus	56.04	60.49	61.41	x	x	63.17	63.17	GR
2nd place, silver medalist(s)	Valentina Savva	Cyprus	58.64	x	62.45	61.75	62.97		62.97	
3rd place, bronze medalist(s)	Mireya Cassar	Malta	47.57	50.74	x	48.69	50.09	x	50.74	
4	Antonella Chouhal-Cachia	Malta	40.77	x	40.65	x	40.57		40.77	
