= Athletics at the 1995 Games of the Small States of Europe =

- Dates: 29 May – 3 June
- Host city: Luxembourg City, Luxembourg
- Venue: Stade Josy Barthel
- Events: 28
- Participation: 8 nations

Athletics at the 1995 Games of the Small States of Europe were held in Luxembourg City, Luxembourg between 29 May and 3 June.

== Medal summary ==
=== Men ===
Event	Gold		Silver		Bronze	
100 metres (wind: +0.5 m/s)	Anninos Markoullides (CYP)	10.36 CR	Giannis Zisimides (CYP)	10.45	Jóhannes Marteinsson (ISL)	10.71
200 metres (wind: +2.4 m/s)	Anninos Markoullides (CYP)	20.64	Giannis Zisimides (CYP)	21.44	Thierry Eischen (LUX)	21.79
400 metres	Manlio Molinari (SMR)	48.94	Konstantinos Pochanis (CYP)	49.35	Ingi Hauksson (ISL)	49.50
800 metres	Finnbogi Gylfason (ISL)	1:52.28	Manlio Molinari (SMR)	1:52.47	Xandru Grech (MLT)	1:52.54
1500 metres	Hristos Papapetrou (CYP)	3:49.83	Xandru Grech (MLT)	3:50.18	Stathis Stasi (CYP)	3:53.45
5000 metres	Georgios Loukaidis (CYP)	14:27.23 CR	Manel Fernandes (AND)	14:29.74	Lahcen Essoussi (MON)	14:35.27
10,000 metres	Manel Fernandes (AND)	30:11.07				
110 metres hurdles (wind: NWI)	Prodromos Katsantonis (CYP)	13.97 CR	Thierry Eischen (LUX)	14.27	Prokopis Georgiou (CYP)	14.28
4×100 metres relay	Cyprus ? ? Giannis Zisimides; Anninos Markoullides	40.32 CR	Luxembourg; Massimiliano Esposito; Serge Müller; Bernard Felten; Thierry Eischen	41.33	Iceland; Jóhannes Marteinsson; Ólafur Traustason; Hörður Gunnarsson; Haukur Sigurðsson	42.12
4×400 metres relay	Cyprus	3:14.80 CR	Iceland	3:18.91	Monaco; Abdoul Sall; Stéphane Reggiani; Abdou Bahmadi; Jean-Camille Oyac	3:21.58
High jump	Raymond Conzemius (LUX)	2.15	Einar Kristjánsson (ISL)	2.15	Neophytos Kalogerou (CYP)	2.09
Pole vault	Fotis Stefani (CYP)	5.10 CR	Bernard Felten (LUX)	5.00	Sigurður Sigurðsson (ISL)	4.90
Long jump	Bernard Felten (LUX)	7.34	Paris Meletiou (CYP)	7.30w	Renos Kolokotronis (CYP)	7.22
Triple jump	Marios Hadjiandreou (CYP)	16.04	Paris Meletiou (CYP)	14.78	Xavi Montane (AND)	14.68
Shot put	Elias Louka (CYP)	18.46	Lambros Iakovou (CYP)	16.47	Sigurður Einarsson (ISL)	14.25
Discus throw	Vésteinn Hafsteinsson (ISL)	59.60 CR	Eggert Bogason (ISL)	51.80	Lambros Iakovou (CYP)	48.22
Hammer throw	Guðmundur Karlsson (ISL)	62.22	Jón Sigurjónsson (ISL)	61.92	Jean-Charles de Ridder (LUX)	60.84
Javelin throw	Sigurður Einarsson (ISL)	73.92	Hristakis Telonis (CYP)	65.96	Antoine Collette (LUX)	64.70

=== Women ===
Event	Gold		Silver		Bronze	
100 metres (wind: +0.9 m/s)	Véronique Linster (LUX)	11.80 CR	Geirlaug Geirlaugsdóttir (ISL)	11.81	Manuela Marxer (LIE)	11.84
200 metres (wind: -0.5 m/s)	Sunna Gestsdóttir (ISL)	24.26 CR	Vaso Papaioannou (CYP)	24.38	Geirlaug Geirlaugsdóttir (ISL)	24.63
400 metres	Daniela Vogt (LIE)	56.32	Helga Halldórsdóttir (ISL)	57.22	Guðlaug Halldórsdóttir (ISL)	58.07
800 metres	Tania Fransissi (LUX)	2:09.66 CR	Magali Guedon (MON)	2:14.08	Laufey Stefánsdóttir (ISL)	2:14.22
5000 metres	Martha Ernstdóttir (ISL)	16:19.31 CR	Danièle Kaber (LUX)	16:29.67	Carol Galea (MLT)	16:47.30
100 metres hurdles (wind: 0.0 m/s)	Manuela Marxer (LIE)	13.43 CR	Véronique Linster (LUX)	13.45	Helga Halldórsdóttir (ISL)	14.18
4×100 metres relay	Iceland; Helga Halldórsdóttir; Geirlaug Geirlaugsdóttir; Disa Gísladóttir; Sunna Gestsdóttir	46.53	Luxembourg; Sandy Leches; Véronique Linster; Anouk Thill; Sandra Felten	46.89	Cyprus; Irini Haralambous ? ? Vaso Papaioannou	46.89
High jump	Disa Gísladóttir (ISL)	1.80	Vala Flosadóttir (ISL)	1.80	Tatiana Kyryakidou (CYP)	1.71
Long jump	Manuela Marxer (LIE)	5.84	Irini Haralambous (CYP)	5.73	Claudia Czerwonka (LUX)	5.69
Shot put	Manuela Marxer (LIE)	13.48	Christina Strovolidou (CYP)	13.31	Guðbjörg Viðarsdóttir (ISL)	11.87

== Medal table ==
Rank	Nation	Gold	Silver	Bronze	Total
1	Cyprus	10	10	7	27
2	Iceland	8	7	10	25
3	Luxembourg	4	6	4	14
4	Liechtenstein	4	0	1	5
5	Andorra	1	1	1	3
6	San Marino	1	1	0	2
7	Malta	0	1	2	3
7	Monaco	0	1	2	3
Totals (8 entries)		28	27	27	82
