= Athletics at the 2025 Games of the Small States of Europe =

- Dates: 27–31 May
- Host city: Andorra la Vella, Andorra
- Venue: Estadi Comunal d'Andorra la Vella
- Events: 36
- Participation: 179 athletes from 9 nations

The athletics competition at the 2025 Games of the Small States of Europe are being held at the Estadi Comunal d'Andorra la Vella in Andorra la Vella, Andorra on 27, 29 and 31 May 2025.

== Medal summary ==
=== Men ===
Event	Gold		Silver		Bronze	
100 m (wind: ? m/s)	Francesco Sansovini; San Marino	10.56	Kolbeinn Höður Gunnarsson; Iceland	10.61	Beppe Grillo; Malta	10.62
200 m (wind: ? m/s)	Beppe Grillo; Malta	21.21	Kristófer Þorgrímsson; Iceland	21.42	Kolbeinn Höður Gunnarsson; Iceland; Stavros Avgoustinou; Cyprus	21.63
400 m	Téo Andant; Monaco	45.91	Matthew Galea Soler; Malta	47.02	Paisios Dimitriadis; Cyprus	47.05
800 m	Pol Moya; Andorra	1:47.85 GR	Jared Micallef; Malta	1:48.21	Mathis Espagnet; Luxembourg	1:50.58
1500 m	Pol Moya; Andorra	3:47.23	Jared Micallef; Malta	3:56.24	Not awarded	
5000 m	Nahuel Carabaña; Andorra	14:42.41	Amine Khadiri; Cyprus	14:46.30	Carles Gómez; Andorra	14:46.68
10,000 m	Nahuel Carabaña; Andorra	30:48.39	Amine Khadiri; Cyprus	31:06.47	Luke Micallef; Malta	31:26.75
110 m hurdles (wind: ? m/s)	Konstantinos Tziakouris; Cyprus	14.35	Þorleifur Einar Leifsson; Iceland	14.74	Matija Vojvodić; Montenegro	14.90
400 m hurdles	Ívar Kristinn Jasonarson; Iceland	51.74	Eloi Vilella; Andorra	52.32	David Friederich; Luxembourg	52.95
3000 m steeplechase	Nahuel Carabaña; Andorra	9:09.50	Gil Weicherding; Luxembourg	9:13.15	Charel Weicherding; Luxembourg	9:19.82
4 × 100 m relay	San Marino; Francesco Molinari; Giammarco Gulini; Alessandro Gasperoni; Francesco Sansovini	40.99	Malta; Kurt Zahra, Beppe Grillo; Luke Bezzina; Matthew Galea Soler	41.13	Iceland; Kolbeinn Höður Gunnarsson; Þorleifur Einar Leifsson; Sæmundur Ólafsson; Kristófer Þorgrímsson	41.17
4 × 400 m relay	Luxembourg; Glenn Lassine; Enguerran Bossicard; David Friederich; Mathis Espagnet	3:13.70	Malta; Nick Bonett; Isaac Bonnici; Jared Micallef; Matthew Galea Soler	3:13.71	Cyprus; Markos Antoniades; Antonis Diamantaki; Pavlos Nikolaou; Paisios Dimitriadis	3:14.63
High jump	Charel Gaspar; Luxembourg	2.08	Joel Riesen; Liechtenstein	2.08	Loizos Chrysostomou; Cyprus	2.06
Pole vault	Jean Woloch; Monaco	5.20	Andreas Kazamias; Cyprus	4.90	Not awarded	
Long jump	Þorleifur Einar Leifsson; Iceland	7.26	Grigoris Nikolaou; Cyprus	7.18	Ian Paul Grech; Malta	6.79
Triple jump	Grigoris Nikolaou; Cyprus	15.11	Louis Muller; Luxembourg	15.09	Guðjón Dunbar Þorsteinsson; Iceland	14.66
Javelin throw	Amir Papazi; Montenegro	69.68	Örn Davidsson; Iceland	68.08	Not awarded	

=== Women ===
Event	Gold		Silver		Bronze	
100 m (wind: ? m/s)	Olivia Fotopoulou; Cyprus	11.61	Alessandra Gasparelli; San Marino	11.73	Thea Parnis; Malta	11.83
200 m (wind: ? m/s)	Olivia Fotopoulou; Cyprus	23.37	Alessandra Gasparelli; San Marino	24.22	Eir Chang Hlésdóttir; Iceland	24.31
400 m	Kalliopi Kountouri; Cyprus	52.67	Thekla Alexandrou; Cyprus	54.33	Guðbjörg Jóna Bjarnadóttir; Iceland	54.99
800 m	Gina McNamara; Malta	2:10.01	Stavrini Filippou; Cyprus	2:10.85	Janet Richard; Malta	2:11.85
1500 m	Vera Bertemes-Hoffmann; Luxembourg	4:22.62	Gina McNamara; Malta	4:29.52	Mireya Bugeja; Malta	4:33.30
5000 m	Jess Martin; Andorra	16:42.94	Gina McNamara; Malta	17:07.30	Alicia Finnis; Cyprus	17:13.94
10,000 m	Jess Martin; Andorra	35:08.01	Jemima Farley; Malta	35:51.69	Alicia Finnis; Cyprus	36:22.71
100 m hurdles (wind: ? m/s)	Victoria Rausch; Luxembourg	13.48	Dafni Georgiou; Cyprus	13.68	Stavriana Adamou; Cyprus	14.20
400 m hurdles	Kalypso Stavrou; Cyprus	58.62 GR	Duna Viñals; Andorra	59.62 NR	Uyana Granger; Luxembourg	59.78
3000 m steeplechase	Chrystalla Hadjipolydorou; Cyprus	11:17.04	Liz Weiler; Luxembourg	11:22.62	Jeanne Cros; Andorra	11:37.92
4 × 100 m relay	Cyprus; Dafni Georgiou; Thekla Alexandrou; Mariliza Pittaka; Olivia Fotopoulou	45.82	Malta; Claire Azzopardi; Janet Richard; Thea Parnis; Alessia Cristina	46.07	Luxembourg; Victoria Rausch; Anais Bauer; Sandrine Rossi; Camille Gaeng	46.20
4 × 400 m relay	Cyprus; Thekla Alexandrou; Stavrini Filippou; Kalypso Stavrou; Kalliopi Kountouri	3:38.46	Andorra; Fiorella Chiappe; Aroa Carballo; Alba Viñals; Duna Viñals	3:40.58	Iceland; Eir Chang Hlésdóttir; Ingibjörg Sigurðardóttir; Ísold Sævarsdóttir; Guðbjörg Jóna Bjarnadóttir	3:40.75
High jump	Marija Vuković; Montenegro	1.85	Birta María Haraldsdóttir; Iceland	1.81	Despoina Charalambous; Cyprus	1.77
Pole vault	Antreana Panteli; Cyprus	3.80	Karen Sif Ársælsdóttir; Iceland	3.70	Stefania Serban; Cyprus	3.70
Long jump	Birna Kristín Kristjánsdóttir; Iceland	6.36	Ísold Sævarsdóttir; Iceland	5.95	Christel El Saneh; Monaco	5.74
Triple jump	Melody Koffi; Luxembourg	12.49	Rebecca Saré; Malta	12.38	Anna Lensment; Luxembourg	11.77
Shot put	Erna Sóley Gunnarsdóttir; Iceland	16.52 GR	Paraskevoulla Thrasyvoulou; Cyprus	15.27	Vesna Kljajević; Montenegro	50.73
Javelin throw	Marija Bogavac; Montenegro	51.24	Noémie Pleimling; Luxembourg	50.73	Irene Theodorou; Cyprus	50.34

=== Mixed ===
Event	Gold		Silver		Bronze	
4 × 400 m relay	Cyprus; Markos Antoniades; Thekla Alexandrou; Paisios Dimitriadis; Kalliopi Kountouri	3:27.02 GR	Malta; Isaac Bonnici; Martha Spiteri; Jared Micallef; Janet Richard	3:27.76	Andorra; Pau Blasi; Fiorella Chiappe; Eloi Vilella; Duna Viñals	3:29.19

=== Medal table ===
* Host nation (Andorra)

Rank	Nation	Gold	Silver	Bronze	Total
1	Cyprus	11	8	10	29
2	Andorra*	7	3	3	13
3	Luxembourg	5	4	6	15
4	Iceland	4	7	6	17
5	Montenegro	3	0	2	5
6	Malta	2	11	6	19
7	San Marino	2	2	0	4
8	Monaco	2	0	1	3
9	Liechtenstein	0	1	0	1
Totals (9 entries)		36	36	34	106

== Participating nations ==
- Andorra (23)
- Cyprus (31)
- Iceland (20)
- Liechtenstein (7)
- Luxembourg (34)
- Malta (29)
- Monaco (16)
- Montenegro (7)
- San Marino (12)

== Men's results ==
=== 100 metres ===
Heats – 27 May
Wind:
Heat 1: ? m/s, Heat 2: ? m/s

Rank	Heat	Name	Team	Time	Notes
1	2	Beppe Grillo	Malta	10.85	Q
2	1	Francesco Sansovini	San Marino	10.92	Q
2	2	Kolbeinn Höður Gunnarsson	Iceland	10.92	Q
4	1	Kristófer Þorgrímsson	Iceland	10.96	Q
5	1	Stavros Avgoustinou	Cyprus	10.98	q
6	1	Omar El Aida Chaffey	Malta	11.01	q
7	2	Charalambos Zinonos	Cyprus	11.14	
8	1	Guillem Arderiu	Andorra	11.20	
9	2	Dylan Ben-Ahmed	Andorra	11.25	
10	2	Giammarco Gulini	San Marino	11.43	
11	2	Thomas Caredda	Monaco	11.48	
12	1	David Wallig	Luxembourg	11.57	

Final – 27 May

Wind: ? m/s

Rank	Lane	Name	Team	Time	Notes
1st place, gold medalist(s)	3	Francesco Sansovini	San Marino	10.56	
2nd place, silver medalist(s)	5	Kolbeinn Höður Gunnarsson	Iceland	10.61	
3rd place, bronze medalist(s)	4	Beppe Grillo	Malta	10.62	
4	1	Omar El Aida Chaffey	Malta	10.70	
5	2	Stavros Avgoustinou	Cyprus	10.74	
6	6	Kristófer Þorgrímsson	Iceland	10.76	

=== 200 metres ===
Heats – 29 May
Wind:
Heat 1: ? m/s, Heat 2: ? m/s

Rank	Heat	Name	Team	Time	Notes
1	1	Beppe Grillo	Malta	21.30	Q
2	2	Kristófer Þorgrímsson	Iceland	21.63	Q
3	2	Stavros Avgoustinou	Cyprus	21.68	Q
4	1	Kolbeinn Höður Gunnarsson	Iceland	21.73	Q
5	1	Charalambos Zinonos	Cyprus	21.98	q
6	1	Guillem Arderiu	Andorra	22.38	q
7	2	Giammarco Gulini	San Marino	22.39	
8	2	Tristan Baldini	Monaco	22.71	

Final – 31 May

Wind: ? m/s

Rank	Lane	Name	Team	Time	Notes
1st place, gold medalist(s)	5	Beppe Grillo	Malta	21.21	
2nd place, silver medalist(s)	6	Kristófer Þorgrímsson	Iceland	21.42	
3rd place, bronze medalist(s)	3	Kolbeinn Höður Gunnarsson	Iceland	21.63	
3rd place, bronze medalist(s)	4	Stavros Avgoustinou	Cyprus	21.63	
5	2	Charalambos Zinonos	Cyprus	21.66	
6	1	Guillem Arderiu	Andorra	22.31	

=== 400 metres ===
Heats – 27 May

Rank	Heat	Name	Team	Time	Notes
1	1	Matthew Galea Soler	Malta	46.90	Q
2	1	Téo Andant	Monaco	46.92	Q
3	1	Paisios Dimitriadis	Cyprus	47.76	q
4	2	Markos Antoniades	Cyprus	47.81	Q
5	2	Pau Blasi	Andorra	48.32	Q
6	2	Glenn Lassine	Luxembourg	48.96	q
7	2	Alessandro Gasperoni	San Marino	49.17	
8	1	Probo Benvenuti	San Marino	49.38	
9	2	Nick Bonett	Malta	49.57	
10	1	Vincent Karger	Luxembourg	49.99	
11	1	Sæmundur Ólafsson	Iceland	50.26	
12	2	Karim Sfaxi	Monaco	51.38	

Final – 29 May

Rank	Lane	Name	Team	Time	Notes
1st place, gold medalist(s)	6	Téo Andant	Monaco	45.91	
2nd place, silver medalist(s)	4	Matthew Galea Soler	Malta	47.02	
3rd place, bronze medalist(s)	3	Paisios Dimitriadis	Cyprus	47.05	
4	5	Markos Antoniades	Cyprus	47.15	
5	2	Pau Blasi	Andorra	48.71	
6	1	Glenn Lassine	Luxembourg	49.61	

=== 800 metres ===
27 May

Rank	Name	Team	Time	Notes
1st place, gold medalist(s)	Pol Moya	Andorra	1:47.85	GR
2nd place, silver medalist(s)	Jared Micallef	Malta	1:48.21	
3rd place, bronze medalist(s)	Mathis Espagnet	Luxembourg	1:50.58	
4	François Ducourant	Monaco	1:52.31	
5	Jory Teixeira	Luxembourg	1:53.33	
6	Fjölnir Brynjarsson	Iceland	1:54.11	
7	Isaac Bonnici	Malta	1:54.64	
8	Antonis Diamantakis	Cyprus	1:59.93	

=== 1500 metres ===
29 May

Rank	Name	Team	Time	Notes
1st place, gold medalist(s)	Pol Moya	Andorra	3:47.23	
2nd place, silver medalist(s)	Jared Micallef	Malta	3:56.24	
3	Daði Arnarson	Iceland	4:07.03	

=== 5000 metres ===
29 May

Rank	Name	Team	Time	Notes
1st place, gold medalist(s)	Nahuel Carabaña	Andorra	14:42.41	
2nd place, silver medalist(s)	Amine Khadiri	Cyprus	14:46.30	
3rd place, bronze medalist(s)	Carles Gómez	Andorra	14:46.68	
4	Simon Spiteri	Malta	14:47.94	
5	Niall Foley	Luxembourg	14:54.70	
6	Luke Micallef	Malta	14:56.76	
7	Quentin Succo	Monaco	15:07.79	
8	Nicolas D'Angelo	Monaco	15:27.55	

=== 10,000 metres ===
31 May

Rank	Name	Team	Time	Notes
1st place, gold medalist(s)	Nahuel Carabaña	Andorra	30:48.39	
2nd place, silver medalist(s)	Amine Khadiri	Cyprus	31:06.47	
3rd place, bronze medalist(s)	Luke Micallef	Malta	31:26.75	
4	Quentin Succo	Monaco	31:49.45	
5	Niall Foley	Luxembourg	32:06.89	
6	Dillon Cassar	Malta	32:18.94	
7	Yannick Lieners	Luxembourg	32:33.20	
8	Carles Gómez	Andorra	32:50.45	
9	Nicolas D'Angelo	Monaco	32:51.85	
	Hlynur Andrésson	Iceland	DQ	

=== 110 metres hurdles ===
27 May
Wind: ? m/s

Rank	Lane	Name	Team	Time	Notes
1st place, gold medalist(s)	4	Konstantinos Tziakouris	Cyprus	14.35	
2nd place, silver medalist(s)	3	Þorleifur Einar Leifsson	Iceland	14.74	
3rd place, bronze medalist(s)	6	Matija Vojvodić	Montenegro	14.90	NU20R
4	5	Pol Herreros	Andorra	14.94	
5	2	Jason Malgherini	Monaco	15.74	

=== 400 metres hurldes ===
Heats – 29 May

Rank	Heat	Name	Team	Time	Notes
1	1	Ívar Kristinn Jasonarson	Iceland	52.45	Q
2	2	Eloi Vilella	Andorra	52.91	Q
3	2	Andreas Georgiou	Cyprus	53.68	Q
4	1	David Friederich	Luxembourg	53.86	Q
5	2	Andrea Ercolani Volta	San Marino	53.88	q
6	1	Anastasios Vasileiou	Cyprus	53.93	q
7	1	Jordan Pace	Malta	54.53	qR, NR
	2	Benjamin Salnitro	Malta	DNF	

Final – 31 May

Rank	Lane	Name	Team	Time	Notes
1st place, gold medalist(s)	5	Ívar Kristinn Jasonarson	Iceland	51.74	
2nd place, silver medalist(s)	6	Eloi Vilella	Andorra	52.32	
3rd place, bronze medalist(s)	3	David Friederich	Luxembourg	52.95	
4	2	Anastasios Vasileiou	Cyprus	53.44	
5	4	Andreas Georgiou	Cyprus	53.52	
6	1	Jordan Pace	Malta	55.45	
		Andrea Ercolani Volta	San Marino	DNS	

=== 3000 metres steeplechase ===
27 May

Rank	Name	Team	Time	Notes
1st place, gold medalist(s)	Nahuel Carabaña	Andorra	9:09.50	
2nd place, silver medalist(s)	Gil Weicherding	Luxembourg	9:13.15	
3rd place, bronze medalist(s)	Charel Weicherding	Luxembourg	9:19.82	
4	Luke Micallef	Malta	9:38.43	
5	Giorgos Tofi	Cyprus	9:43.42	
6	Francesc Carmona	Andorra	9:50.66	

=== 4 × 100 meters relay ===
31 May

Rank	Lane	Nation	Competitors	Time	Notes
1st place, gold medalist(s)	5	San Marino	Francesco Molinari, Giammarco Gulini, Alessandro Gasperoni, Francesco Sansovini	40.99	NR
2nd place, silver medalist(s)	6	Malta	Kurt Zahra, Beppe Grillo, Luke Bezzina, Matthew Galea Soler	41.13	
3rd place, bronze medalist(s)	3	Iceland	Kolbeinn Höður Gunnarsson, Þorleifur Einar Leifsson, Sæmundur Ólafsson, Kristófer Þorgrímsson	41.17	
4	4	Cyprus	Emmanouil Christodoulou, Charalambos Zinonos, Giorgos Triseliotis, Stavros Avgoustinou	41.23	
5	2	Luxembourg	Glenn Lassine, Alan Jéhanno, Enguerran Bossicard, Louis Muller	41.54	
6	1	Andorra	Dylan Ben-Ahmed, Guillem Arderiu, Pau Blasi, Mikel de Sa	41.60	NR

=== 4 × 400 meters relay ===
31 May

Rank	Heat	Nation	Competitors	Time	Notes
1st place, gold medalist(s)	1	Luxembourg	Glenn Lassine, Enguerran Bossicard, David Friederich, Mathis Espagnet	3:13.70	NR
2nd place, silver medalist(s)	2	Malta	Nick Bonett, Isaac Bonnici, Jared Micallef, Matthew Galea Soler	3:13.71	NR
3rd place, bronze medalist(s)	2	Cyprus	Markos Antoniades, Antonis Diamantaki, Pavlos Nikolaou, Paisios Dimitriadis	3:14.63	
4	1	Andorra	Pau Blasi, Pol Moya, Guillem Arderiu, Eloi Vilella	3:17.19	NR
5	2	San Marino	Francesco Molinari, Alessandro Gasperoni, Probo Benvenuti, Andrea Ercolani Volta	3:18.88	
9	1	Iceland	Þorleifur Einar Leifsson, Daði Arnarson, Fjölnir Brynjarsson, Sæmundur Ólafsson	DNF	
9	2	Monaco	Tristan Baldini, François Ducourant, Karim Sfaxi, Téo Andant	DQ	FS

=== High jump ===
27 May

Rank	Name	Team	Result	Notes
1st place, gold medalist(s)	Charel Gaspar	Luxembourg	2.08	
2nd place, silver medalist(s)	Joel Riesen	Liechtenstein	2.08	=NR
3rd place, bronze medalist(s)	Loizos Chrysostomou	Cyprus	2.06	
4	Simone Piva	San Marino	2.03	

=== Pole vault ===
29 May

Rank	Name	Team	Result	Notes
1st place, gold medalist(s)	Jean Woloch	Monaco	5.20	
2nd place, silver medalist(s)	Andreas Kazamias	Cyprus	4.90	
3	Miquel Vílchez	Andorra	4.60	
	Christos Tamanis	Cyprus	DNS	

=== Long jump ===
29 May

Rank	Name	Team	Result	Notes
1st place, gold medalist(s)	Þorleifur Einar Leifsson	Iceland	7.26	
2nd place, silver medalist(s)	Grigoris Nikolaou	Cyprus	7.18	
3rd place, bronze medalist(s)	Ian Paul Grech	Malta	6.79	
4	Guðjón Dunbar Þorsteinsson	Iceland	6.60	

=== Triple jump ===
31 May

Rank	Name	Team	Result	Notes
1st place, gold medalist(s)	Grigoris Nikolaou	Cyprus	15.11	
2nd place, silver medalist(s)	Louis Muller	Luxembourg	15.09	
3rd place, bronze medalist(s)	Guðjón Dunbar Þorsteinsson	Iceland	14.66	
4	Ian Paul Grech	Malta	14.52	
5	Armani James	Malta	14.36	

=== Javelin throw ===
31 May

Rank	Name	Team	Result	Notes
1st place, gold medalist(s)	Amir Papazi	Montenegro	69.68	
2nd place, silver medalist(s)	Örn Davíðsson	Iceland	68.08	
3	Matthias Verling	Liechtenstein	66.86	

== Women's results ==
=== 100 metres ===
Heats – 27 May
Wind:
Heat 1: ? m/s, Heat 2: ? m/s

Rank	Heat	Name	Team	Time	Notes
1	2	Alessandra Gasparelli	San Marino	11.80	Q
2	1	Olivia Fotopoulou	Cyprus	11.86	Q
3	1	Thea Parnis	Malta	12.08	Q
4	1	María Helga Högnadóttir	Iceland	12.28	q
4	2	Claire Azzopardi	Malta	12.28	Q
6	2	Camille Gaeng	Luxembourg	12.29	q
7	1	Victoria Rausch	Luxembourg	12.32	
8	2	Mariliza Pittaka	Cyprus	12.35	
9	1	Fiona Matt	Liechtenstein	12.55	NU18R
10	2	Celestine Lung	Monaco	12.65	
11	1	Rebecca Guidi	San Marino	13.16	
	2	Eir Chang Hlésdóttir	Iceland	DNS	

Final – 27 May

Wind: ? m/s

Rank	Lane	Name	Team	Time	Notes
1st place, gold medalist(s)	3	Olivia Fotopoulou	Cyprus	11.61	
2nd place, silver medalist(s)	4	Alessandra Gasparelli	San Marino	11.73	
3rd place, bronze medalist(s)	5	Thea Parnis	Malta	11.83	
4	2	María Helga Högnadóttir	Iceland	12.04	
5	1	Camille Gaeng	Luxembourg	12.22	
6	6	Claire Azzopardi	Malta	12.27	

=== 200 metres ===
Heats – 29 May
Wind:
Heat 1: ? m/s, Heat 2: ? m/s

Rank	Heat	Name	Team	Time	Notes
1	2	Olivia Fotopoulou	Cyprus	23.20	Q
2	1	Eir Chang Hlésdóttir	Iceland	24.32	Q
2	2	Thea Parnis	Malta	24.32	Q
4	1	Alessandra Gasparelli	San Marino	24.39	Q
5	1	Mariliza Pittaka	Cyprus	24.86	q
6	2	Anaïs Bauer	Luxembourg	25.37	q
7	2	Aroa Carballo	Andorra	25.58	
8	1	Sophia Schaack	Luxembourg	25.69	
9	2	Noemi Cola	San Marino	26.48	

Final – 31 May

Wind: ? m/s

Rank	Lane	Name	Team	Time	Notes
1st place, gold medalist(s)	5	Olivia Fotopoulou	Cyprus	23.37	
2nd place, silver medalist(s)	3	Alessandra Gasparelli	San Marino	24.22	
3rd place, bronze medalist(s)	6	Eir Chang Hlésdóttir	Iceland	24.31	
4	4	Thea Parnis	Malta	24.68	
5	2	Mariliza Pittaka	Cyprus	25.26	
6	1	Anaïs Bauer	Luxembourg	25.51	

=== 400 metres ===
Heats – 27 May

Rank	Heat	Name	Team	Time	Notes
1	1	Kalliopi Kountouri	Cyprus	54.82	Q
2	2	Thekla Alexandrou	Cyprus	54.86	Q
3	2	Guðbjörg Jóna Bjarnadóttir	Iceland	55.20	Q
4	1	Fiorella Chiappe	Andorra	56.36	Q
5	2	Nadine Stueber	Liechtenstein	57.43	q
6	2	Aroa Carballo	Andorra	57.74	q
7	1	Elise Romero	Luxembourg	57.77	
8	1	Martha Spiteri	Malta	58.37	
9	1	Syria Trifilio	Monaco	1:00.37	
10	2	Sophie Robson	Monaco	1:01.22	

Final – 29 May

Rank	Lane	Name	Team	Time	Notes
1st place, gold medalist(s)	4	Kalliopi Kountouri	Cyprus	52.67	
2nd place, silver medalist(s)	5	Thekla Alexandrou	Cyprus	54.33	
3rd place, bronze medalist(s)	6	Guðbjörg Jóna Bjarnadóttir	Iceland	54.99	
4	3	Fiorella Chiappe	Andorra	55.11	
5	1	Aroa Carballo	Andorra	57.13	
6	2	Nadine Stueber	Liechtenstein	57.64	

=== 800 metres ===
27 May

Rank	Name	Team	Time	Notes
1st place, gold medalist(s)	Gina McNamara	Malta	2:10.01	
2nd place, silver medalist(s)	Stavrini Filippou	Cyprus	2:10.85	
3rd place, bronze medalist(s)	Janet Richard	Malta	2:11.85	
4	Carole Kill	Luxembourg	2:14.81	
5	Julia Ciccone	Luxembourg	2:17.46	
6	Tetiana Sevluk-Lagoutte	Monaco	2:17.89	
7	Cristina Martins	Andorra	2:18.70	
8	Sienna Zobel	Liechtenstein	2:19.45	

=== 1500 metres ===
29 May

Rank	Name	Team	Time	Notes
1st place, gold medalist(s)	Vera Bertemes-Hoffmann	Luxembourg	4:22.62	
2nd place, silver medalist(s)	Gina McNamara	Malta	4:29.52	
3rd place, bronze medalist(s)	Mireya Bugeja	Malta	4:33.30	
4	Aina Cinca	Andorra	4:41.57	
5	Íris Anna Skúladóttir	Iceland	4:44.95	

=== 5000 metres ===
31 May

Rank	Name	Team	Time	Notes
1st place, gold medalist(s)	Jess Martin	Andorra	16:42.94	
2nd place, silver medalist(s)	Gina McNamara	Malta	17:07.30	
3rd place, bronze medalist(s)	Alicia Finnis	Cyprus	17:13.94	
4	Sandra Lieners	Luxembourg	17:38.33	
5	Evangelista Divetain	Monaco	17:40.15	
6	Aina Cinca	Andorra	19:26.80	
6	Íris Anna Skúladóttir	Iceland	19:26.80	
	Jemima Farley	Malta	DNF	

=== 10,000 metres ===
27 May

Rank	Name	Team	Time	Notes
1st place, gold medalist(s)	Jess Martin	Andorra	35:08.01	
2nd place, silver medalist(s)	Jemima Farley	Malta	35:51.69	
3rd place, bronze medalist(s)	Alicia Finnis	Cyprus	36:22.71	
4	Ariadna Fenés	Andorra	36:29.04	
5	Evangelista Divetain	Monaco	36:52.40	
6	Sandra Lieners	Luxembourg	36:55.94	
7	Lisa Marie Bezzina	Malta	39:54.07	

=== 100 metres hurldes ===
Heats – 31 May
Wind:
Heat 1: ? m/s, Heat 2: ? m/s

Rank	Heat	Name	Team	Time	Notes
1	2	Dafni Georgiou	Cyprus	13.71	Q
2	1	Victoria Rausch	Luxembourg	13.72	Q
3	1	Stavriana Adamou	Cyprus	14.64	Q
3	1	María Helga Högnadóttir	Iceland	14.64	Q
5	1	Etna Pou	Andorra	14.78	q
6	2	Ísold Sævarsdóttir	Iceland	14.86	Q
7	1	Julia Rohrer	Liechtenstein	15.21	
8	2	Anđela Drobnjak	Montenegro	15.25	
9	2	Hannah Kramer	Luxembourg	15.26	

Final – 31 May

Wind: ? m/s

Rank	Lane	Name	Team	Time	Notes
1st place, gold medalist(s)	4	Victoria Rausch	Luxembourg	13.48	
2nd place, silver medalist(s)	5	Dafni Georgiou	Cyprus	13.68	
3rd place, bronze medalist(s)	2	Stavriana Adamou	Cyprus	14.20	
4	1	Ísold Sævarsdóttir	Iceland	14.54	
5	6	Etna Pou	Andorra	14.88	
6	3	María Helga Högnadóttir	Iceland	14.91	

=== 400 metres hurldes ===
Heats – 29 May

Rank	Heat	Name	Team	Time	Notes
1	1	Kalypso Stavrou	Cyprus	58.98	Q, GR
2	1	Alba Viñals	Andorra	59.63	Q, NR, NU20R
3	1	Ingibjörg Sigurðardóttir	Iceland	1:00.57	q
4	2	Duna Viñals	Andorra	1:00.88	Q
5	2	Uyana Granger	Luxembourg	1:01.10	Q, NU20R, NU18R
6	1	Yaara Puraye	Luxembourg	1:02.97	q
7	2	Marie-Charlotte Gastaud	Monaco	1:03.18	
8	2	Zaida Pace	Malta	1:07.76	

Final – 31 May

Rank	Lane	Name	Team	Time	Notes
1st place, gold medalist(s)	5	Kalypso Stavrou	Cyprus	58.62	GR
2nd place, silver medalist(s)	6	Duna Viñals	Andorra	59.62	NR, NU20R
3rd place, bronze medalist(s)	2	Uyana Granger	Luxembourg	59.78	NU20R, NU18R
4	4	Alba Viñals	Andorra	1:01.35	
5	3	Ingibjörg Sigurðardóttir	Iceland	1:02.48	
	1	Yaara Puraye	Luxembourg	DNS	

=== 3000 metres steeplechase ===
27 May

Rank	Name	Team	Time	Notes
1st place, gold medalist(s)	Chrystalla Hadjipolydorou	Cyprus	11:17.04	
2nd place, silver medalist(s)	Liz Weiler	Luxembourg	11:22.62	
3rd place, bronze medalist(s)	Jeanne Cros	Andorra	11:37.92	
4	Rosalie Cauchi	Malta	11:39.07	
5	Eloïse Lefevre	Luxembourg	12:23.04	
6	Xènia Mourelo	Andorra	12:29.95	

=== 4 × 100 meters relay ===
31 May

Rank	Heat	Nation	Competitors	Time	Notes
1st place, gold medalist(s)	2	Cyprus	Dafni Georgiou, Thekla Alexandrou, Mariliza Pittaka, Olivia Fotopoulou	45.82	
2nd place, silver medalist(s)	2	Malta	Claire Azzopardi, Janet Richard, Thea Parnis, Alessia Cristina	46.07	
3rd place, bronze medalist(s)	2	Luxembourg	Victoria Rausch, Anaïs Bauer, Sandrine Rossi, Camille Gaeng	46.20	
4	1	Iceland	Birna Kristín Kristjánsdóttir, Ingibjörg Sigurðardóttir, Ísold Sævarsdóttir, Eir Chang Hlésdóttir	46.61	
5	1	Andorra	Etna Pou, Fiorella Chiappe, Noa Godoy, Aroa Carballo	47.52	
6	2	San Marino	Rebecca Guidi, Greta San Martini, Noemi Cola, Alessandra Gasparelli	47.57	NR
7	1	Liechtenstein	Julia Rohrer, Nadine Stueber, Sienna Zobel, Fiona Matt	48.53	

=== 4 × 400 meters relay ===
31 May

Rank	Lane	Nation	Competitors	Time	Notes
1st place, gold medalist(s)	5	Cyprus	Thekla Alexandrou, Stavrini Filippou, Kalypso Stavrou, Kalliopi Kountouri	3:38.46	NR
2nd place, silver medalist(s)	6	Andorra	Fiorella Chiappe, Aroa Carballo, Alba Viñals, Duna Viñals	3:40.58	
3rd place, bronze medalist(s)	4	Iceland	Eir Chang Hlésdóttir, Ingibjörg Sigurðardóttir, Ísold Sævarsdóttir, Guðbjörg Jóna Bjarnadóttir	3:40.75	
4	2	Malta	Janet Richard, Zaida Pace, Martha Spiteri, Josepha Micallef	3:50.66	
5	3	Luxembourg	Uyana Granger, Julia Ciccone, Elise Romero, Carole Kill	3:51.39	
6	1	Monaco	Syria Trifilio, Sophie Robson, Marie-Charlotte Gastaud, Tetiana Sevluk Lagoutte	3:57.04	

=== High jump ===
29 May

Rank	Name	Team	Result	Notes
1st place, gold medalist(s)	Marija Vuković	Montenegro	1.85	
2nd place, silver medalist(s)	Birta María Haraldsdóttir	Iceland	1.81	
3rd place, bronze medalist(s)	Despoina Charalambous	Cyprus	1.77	
4	Julie Craenen	Luxembourg	1.73	
5	Noa Godoy	Andorra	1.55	

=== Pole vault ===
27 May

Rank	Name	Team	Result	Notes
1st place, gold medalist(s)	Antriana Panteli	Cyprus	3.80	
2nd place, silver medalist(s)	Karen Sif Ársælsdóttir	Iceland	3.70	
3rd place, bronze medalist(s)	Stefania Codruta Serban	Cyprus	3.70	
4	Martina Muraccini	San Marino	3.40	
	Sana Grillo	Malta	NM	

=== Long jump ===
27 May

Rank	Name	Team	Result	Notes
1st place, gold medalist(s)	Birna Kristín Kristjánsdóttir	Iceland	6.36	
2nd place, silver medalist(s)	Ísold Sævarsdóttir	Iceland	5.95	
3rd place, bronze medalist(s)	Christel El Saneh	Monaco	5.74	
4	Rebecca Saré	Malta	5.60	
5	Greta San Martini	San Marino	5.51	
6	Anđela Đuranović	Montenegro	5.43	
7	Noa Godoy	Andorra	5.11	

=== Triple jump ===
31 May

Rank	Name	Team	Result	Notes
1st place, gold medalist(s)	Melody Koffi	Luxembourg	12.49	
2nd place, silver medalist(s)	Rebecca Saré	Malta	12.38	
3rd place, bronze medalist(s)	Anna Lensment	Luxembourg	11.77	
4	Christel El Saneh	Monaco	11.51	
5	Greta San Martini	San Marino	11.20	

=== Shot put ===
29 May

Rank	Name	Team	Result	Notes
1st place, gold medalist(s)	Erna Sóley Gunnarsdóttir	Iceland	16.52	GR
2nd place, silver medalist(s)	Paraskevoulla Thrasyvoulou	Cyprus	15.27	
3rd place, bronze medalist(s)	Vesna Kljajević	Montenegro	14.15	
4	Stéphanie Krumlovsky	Luxembourg	13.98	
5	Jule Insinna	Liechtenstein	13.25	

=== Javelin throw ===
27 May

Rank	Name	Team	Result	Notes
1st place, gold medalist(s)	Marija Bogavac	Montenegro	51.24	
2nd place, silver medalist(s)	Noémie Pleimling	Luxembourg	50.73	
3rd place, bronze medalist(s)	Irene Jane Theodorou	Cyprus	50.34	
4	Julia Rohrer	Liechtenstein	50.22	NR, NU23R
5	Ísold Sævarsdóttir	Iceland	37.70	

== Mixed results ==
=== 4 × 400 meters relay ===
27 May

Rank	Lane	Nation	Competitors	Time	Notes
1st place, gold medalist(s)	4	Cyprus	Markos Antoniades, Thekla Alexandrou, Paisios Dimitriadis, Kalliopi Kountouri	3:27.02	GR
2nd place, silver medalist(s)	5	Malta	Isaac Bonnici, Martha Spiteri, Jared Micallef, Janet Richard	3:27.76	NR
3rd place, bronze medalist(s)	6	Andorra	Pau Blasi, Fiorella Chiappe, Eloi Vilella, Duna Viñals	3:29.19	
4	3	Iceland	Ívar Kristinn Jasonarson, Sæmundur Ólafsson, Ísold Sævarsdóttir, Ingibjörg Sigurðardóttir	3:29.22	NR
5	2	Luxembourg	Vincent Karger, Elise Romero, Jory Teixeira, Carole Kill	3:33.86	
6	1	Monaco	Tristan Baldini, Sophie Robson, François Ducourant, Tetiana Sevluk-Lagoutte	3:39.41	
