= Jess Martin =

British long-distance runner (born 1992)

Jessica Anne "Jess" Martin (née Andrews; born 1 October 1992) is a British long-distance runner who competed at the 2016 Summer Olympics, held in Rio de Janeiro, Brazil.

== Personal life ==
Martin was born on 1 October 1992. She attended school on the Isle of Wight. As a student she received financial support from fellow Great Britain Olympian Mo Farah's foundation, studying for a degree in Sport, Health & Exercise Sciences at Brunel University. She is married to Irish road cyclist Dan Martin. The couple met whilst they were training in the Sierra Nevada. In 2014, she moved from Surrey to Martin's home in Andorra, and she currently splits her time between Andorra and Girona, where she trains with her coach Josep Carballude.

== Career ==
Martin was unable to compete in the summer of 2013 after suffering a stress-fracture in her foot but returned to competition towards the end of the year. At the 2013 European Cross Country Championships, held in Belgrade, Serbia, she finished 16th in the individual women's under-23's race. She also won a gold medal as part of the British women's under-23's team alongside Charlotte Purdue, Kate Avery, Lily Partridge, Rhona Auckland and Laura Weightman.

In February 2014 she finished fifth over the eight kilometre distance at the National Cross-Country Championships in Nottingham, with her team Aldershot Farnham and District, winning the team title. Later that year she competed at the Southern Cross Country championships, winning the senior women's title and finished fifth at the Saucony English Cross Country Nationals.

At the 2016 British Olympic trials, Martin beat her personal best in the 10,000 metres by 83 seconds to win the event in a time of 31 minutes 58 seconds and qualify for the Great Britain team for the 2016 Summer Olympics, being held in Rio de Janeiro, Brazil. The trials race was only Martin's second competitive 10,000 metre track race, having made her debut six weeks earlier at a meeting in Portugal. Beth Potter finished second in the race to also qualify for Rio. Martin further improved her personal best in the Olympics finals, finishing in 16th place at 31 minutes 35 seconds After stepping off the track with six laps remaining of the 2017 World Championships 10,000m race she subsequently announced her retirement from international athletics aged 24.

In 2025, Martin announced her intention to return to competitive running. Representing her adopted nation of Andorra, Martin won gold in both the 5,000m and 10,000m at the 2025 Games of the Small States of Europe.

Martin ran 32:04 for the 10k run in Valencia in January 2026, before running 32:08 in Laredo in April. The following month, she was selected to represent Great Britain for the first time since 2017, at the European 10,000m Cup.
