= List of Andorran records in athletics =

The following are the national records in athletics in Andorra maintained by its national athletics federation: Federació Andorrana d'Atletisme (FAA).

== Outdoor ==
Key to tables: Awaiting ratification Record not kept by FAA Not ratified or later rescinded by FAA

=== Men ===
Event	Record	Athlete	Date	Meet	Place	Ref.
60 m	7.17 NWI	Mikel de Sa	21 February 2015		Andorra	
100 m	10.79 (+1.7 m/s)	Dylan Ben-Ahmed	6 June 2026	Gran Premio Aire Libre Federación Catalana Atletismo	Santa Coloma de Gramenet, Spain	
150 m	16.62 (±0.0 m/s)	Pau Batllori	7 July 2022		Lleida, Spain	
200 m	21.89 (+2.0 m/s)	Guillem Arderiu Vilanova	30 March 2025	Andorran Championships	Andorra la Vella, Andorra	
300 m	35.97	Pau Blasi	13 March 2021		Andorra	
400 m	48.38	Daniel Gómez	26 May 1999	Games of the Small States of Europe	Schaan, Liechtenstein	
600 m	1:25.28	Pol Moya	26 August 2020		Andorra	
800 m	1:46.02	Pol Moya	1 August 2026	IFAM Oordegem	Oordegem, Belgium	
1000 m	2:23.34	Pol Moya	21 July 2020		Olot, Spain	
1500 m	3:34.54	Pol Moya	26 June 2026	Boris Hanžeković Memorial	Zagreb, Croatia	
Mile	4:15.53	Josep Graells	15 July 1987		Barcelona, Spain	
Mile (road)	4:01.91	Pol Moya	19 September 2026	World Road Running Championships	Copenhagen, Denmark	
3000 m	8:03.69	Antoni Bernadó	26 May 2007		Palafrugell, Spain	
5000 m	14:05.16	Nahuel Carabaña	3 June 2023	Games of the Small States of Europe	Marsa, Malta	
5 km (road)	14:43	Pol Moya	31 December 2022	Cursa dels Nassos	Barcelona, Spain	
10,000 m	28:47.06	Nahuel Carabaña	23 May 2026	European 10,000m Cup	La Spezia, Italy	
10 km (road)	28:04	Nahuel Carabaña	11 January 2026	10K Valencia Ibercaja by Kiprun	Valencia, Spain	
15 km (road)	46:07+	Marcos Sanza	27 October 2019	Valencia Half Marathon	Valencia, Spain	
20 km (road)	1:01:12+	Marcos Sanza	27 October 2019	Valencia Half Marathon	Valencia, Spain	
Half marathon	1:05:24	Antoni Bernadó	6 March 2005		Barcelona, Spain	
Half marathon	1:04:22	Marcos Sanza	27 October 2019	Valencia Half Marathon	Valencia, Spain	
Marathon	2:14:25	Antoni Bernadó	16 March 2003		Barcelona, Spain	
50 km (track)	6:32:53+	Josep Doval Uradas	17 October 2004		Terrassa, Spain	
50 km (road)	3:20:59	Ivan Ramirez Bator	30 March 2008		Madrid, Spain	
12 hours	97.049 m	Joan Berenguer	15 December 2018		Barcelona, Spain	
100 km (track)	14:36:08	Josep Doval Uradas	17 October 2004		Terrassa, Spain	
100 km (road)	7:45:38 (Note: by federation source; 7:48:38 by other sources)	Ivan Ramirez Bator	22 April 2012	IAU 100km European Championships	Seregno, Italy	
24 hours	161.600 m	Joan Berenguer	18 December 2022		Barcelona, Spain	
60 m hurdles	8.74 NWI	Marc Medina Orobitg	15 November 2006		Andorra	
110 m hurdles	14.47 (+1.8 m/s)	Estéve Martín	26 May 1999	Games of the Small States of Europe	Schaan, Liechtenstein	
400 m hurdles	50.59	Daniel Gómez	3 August 2008		Barcelona, Spain	
2000 m steeplechase	5:43.72	Josep Sansa	11 June 2000		Andorra la Vella, Andorra	
3000 m steeplechase	8:21.76	Nahuel Carabaña	10 September 2023	Hanžeković Memorial	Zagreb, Croatia	
High jump	2.14 m	Estéve Martín	26 June 1996		Barcelona, Spain	
Pole vault	4.95 m	Miquel Vílchez	1 June 2017	Games of the Small States of Europe	Serravalle, San Marino	
Long jump	7.57 m (±0.0 m/s)	Estéve Martín	25 June 2000		Castellón, Spain	
Triple jump	15.35 m (+1.5 m/s)	Xavier Montanté	6 July 1998		Andorra la Vella, Andorra	
Shot put	13.62 m	Ángel Moreno	17 January 1998		Barcelona, Spain	
Discus throw	48.74 m	Ángel Moreno	30 July 2000		Barcelona, Spain	
Hammer throw	47.77 m	Joan Valls	21 December 2002		Andorra la Vella, Andorra	
Javelin throw	61.64 m	Adria Perez	17 July 1998		Pamplona, Spain	
Decathlon	6204 pts	Estéve Martín	26-27 June 1999		Andorra la Vella, Andorra	
Decathlon	100m (wind) / Long jump (wind) / Shot put / High jump / 400m / 110m H (wind) / Discus / Pole vault / Javelin / 1500m; 11.30 (−2.1 m/s) / 7.20 m (+0.9 m/s) / 10.79 m / 2.09 m / 54.86 / 15.26 (−2.8 m/s) / 28.55 m / 3.00 m / 40.61 m / 5:17.94					
5000 m walk (track)	26:15.9	Jordi Martínez	21 April 1991		Sant Celoni, Spain	
10,000 m walk (track)	52:21.3	Jordi Martínez	10 June 1990		Arbeca, Spain	
10 km walk (road)	1:06:36	Kevin Poulet	2 December 2006		Santa Maria de Palautordera, Spain	
20 km walk (road)	1:39:36	Antoni Martínez	29 January 1984		Barcelona, Spain	
50 km walk (road)						
4 × 100 m relay	41.60	Andorra; Dylan Ben-Ahmed; Guillem Arderiu; Pau Blasi; Mikel de Sa	31 May 2025	Games of the Small States of Europe	Andorra la Vella, Andorra	
4 × 400 m relay	3:17.19	Andorra; Pau Blasi; Pol Moya; Eloi Vilella; Eloi Vilella	31 May 2025	Games of the Small States of Europe	Andorra la Vella, Andorra	

=== Women ===
Event	Record	Athlete	Date	Meet	Place	Ref.
60 m	8.10 (−2.2 m/s)	Montse Pujol	16 February 2008		Andorra	
100 m	12.01 (+1.5 m/s)	Cristina Llovera	16 June 2018		Gavà, Spain	
200 m	24.95 (+1.4 m/s)	Cristina Llovera	9 June 2018		Schaan, Liechtenstein	
300 m	42.03	Duna Viñals	22 May 2021		Andorra	
400 m	58.65 (Note: indoor mark ratified as absolute record)	Carlota Malaga	21 May 2021		Mollet del Vallès, Spain	
400 m	58.3 h	Sandra Vidal	28 April 1996		Lleida, Spain	
800 m	2:13.04	Natàlia Gallego	11 August 2007		Castres, France	
1000 m	3:08.69	Eva Iglesias	14 June 2008		Basauri, Spain	
1500 m	4:38.24	Aina Cinca	15 June 2022		Barcelona, Spain	
3000 m	10:00.55	Silvia Felipo	24 July 2002		L'Hospitalet de Llobregat, Spain	
5000 m	17:19.43	Silvia Felipo	29 June 2002		Igualada, Spain	
5 km (road)	18:10	Xènia Mourelo	26 December 2022		Barcelona, Spain	
10,000 m	36:38.60	Silvia Felipo	19 March 2005		Mataró, Spain	
10 km (road)	36:46	Ariadna Fenés	31 December 2022		Barcelona, Spain	
15 km (road)	1:07:19+	Dulce Casanova	19 November 2017	Valencia Marathon	Valencia, Spain	
Half marathon	1:22:43	Sílvia Felipo	29 June 2002		Igualada, Spain	
25 km (road)	1:51:17+	Dulce Casanova	19 November 2017	Valencia Marathon	Valencia, Spain	
30 km (road)	2:13:30+	Dulce Casanova	19 November 2017	Valencia Marathon	Valencia, Spain	
Marathon	3:09:49	Dulce Casanova	19 November 2017	Valencia Marathon	Valencia, Spain	
50 km (road)	6:18:14	Cristina Bres	7 October 2000		Santander, Spain	
60 m hurdles	9.68 (±0.0 m/s)	Montse Pujol	2 February 2008		Andorra	
100 m hurdles	14.68 (+0.8 m/s)	Alba Viñals	21 June 2023	European Team Championships	Chorzów, Poland	
400 m hurdles	59.60	Duna Viñals	8 August 2025	European Athletics U20 Championships	Tampere, Finland	
2000 m steeplechase	8:52.14	Gemma Iglesias	1 May 2005		Andorra la Vella, Andorra	
3000 m steeplechase	11:02.33 (Note: ratified by FAA but not recognised by World Athletics)	Xènia Mourelo	2 July 2022		Granollers, Spain	
3000 m steeplechase	11:13.04	Xènia Mourelo	5 June 2022	Catalonian Championships	Tarragona, Spain	
High jump	1.83 m	Margarida Moreno	1 June 1991		Monzón, Spain	
Pole vault	2.90 m	María Martínez	18 May 2008		El Prat de Llobregat, Spain	
Long jump	5.75 m (±0.0 m/s)	Montserrat Pujol	2 June 2005	Games of the Small States of Europe	Andorra la Vella, Andorra	
Triple jump	12.21 m (±0.0 m/s) (Note: indoor mark ratified as absolute record)	Montserrat Pujol	1 July 2007		Andorra la Vella, Andorra	
Shot put	9.68 m (Note: indoor mark ratified as absolute record)	Montserrat Pujol	5 May 2001		Andorra la Vella, Andorra	
Discus throw	28.96 m (Note: by federation source; 48.46 by World Athletics source)	Míriam Tizón	24 May 2008		Andorra la Vella, Andorra	
Hammer throw	42.65 m	Elena Villalón	8 July 2006		Toulouse, France	
Javelin throw	29.60 m	Maria Morató	22 June 2023	European Team Championships	Chorzów, Poland	
Heptathlon	4067 pts	Montserrat Pujol	10–11 July 1999		Torremolinos, Spain	
Heptathlon	100m H (wind) / High jump / Shot put / 200m (wind) / Long jump (wind) / Javelin / 800m; 16.42 (±0.0 m/s) / 1.56 m / 8.34 m / 28.02 (−1.5 m/s) / 5.40 m (±0.0 m/s) / 21.82 m / 2:31.82					
5000 m walk (track)	31:10.95	Montse Sanchez	17 June 1990		Andorra la Vella, Andorra	
5 km walk (road)	42:17	Sandra Villacampa	2 December 2006		Santa Maria de Palautordera, Spain	
5 km walk (road)	42:17	Marta López	2 December 2006		Santa Maria de Palautordera, Spain	
20 km walk (road)						
50 km walk (road)						
4 × 100 m relay	48.61	Andorra; Jana Rodriguez; Alba Viñals; Duna Viñals; Carlota Málaga	21 June 2023	European Team Championships	Chorzów, Poland	
4 × 200 m relay	1:52.06	Andorra; S. Vilanova; N. Sanchez; M. Arauz; Margarida Moreno	3 September 1988		Andorra la Vella, Andorra	
4 × 400 m relay	3:55.31	Andorra; Duna Viñals; Alba Viñals; Cristina Martins; Carlota Málaga	3 June 2023		Marsa, Malta	

=== Mixed ===
Event	Record	Athlete	Date	Meet	Place	Ref.
4 × 400 m relay	3:29.19	Andorra; Pau Blasi; Fiorella Chiappe; Eloi Vilella; Duna Viñals	27 May 2025	Games of the Small States of Europe	Andorra la Vella, Andorra	

== Indoor ==
=== Men ===
Event	Record	Athlete	Date	Meet	Place	Ref.
60 m	7.01	Estéve Martín	4 March 2000		Escaldes, Andorra	
200 m	22.20	Guillem Arderiu Vilanova	1 February 2025	Cataluña Championships	Sabadell, Spain	
300 m	35.62	Pau Blasi	11 December 2022	Games of the Small States of Europe	Sabadell, Spain	
400 m	47.94 (Note: outdoor mark ratified as absolute record)	Daniel Gómez	6 February 2000		Seville, Spain	
500 m	1:13.58	Pau Blasi	17 December 2017		Sabadell, Spain	
800 m	1:48.86	Pol Moya	7 February 2017	Míting Internacional de Catalunya	Sabadell, Spain	
1000 m	2:50.29	Ivan Da Costa Barbosa	17 February 2007		Vilafranca, Spain	
1500 m	3:38.37	Pol Moya	18 January 2026	CMCM Meeting	Kirchberg, Luxembourg	
3000 m	8:07.63	Nahuel Carabaña	25 February 2022	Spanish Championships	Ourense, Spain	
60 m hurdles	8.15	Estéve Martín	4 March 2000		Escaldes, Andorra	
High jump	2.12 m	Estéve Martín	3 February 1996		Vilafranca, Spain	
Pole vault	4.92 m	Miguel Vilchez	9 February 2017		Andorra	
Long jump	7.52 m	Estéve Martín	20 February 2000		Vilafranca, Spain	
Triple jump	14.81 m	Xavier Montané	25 January 1992		Sant Cugat, Spain	
Shot put	12.45 m	Unai Olea	7 January 2018		Sabadell, Spain	
Heptathlon	4766 pts	Estéve Martín	25 January 1998		Vilafranca, Spain	
Heptathlon	60m / Long jump / Shot put / High jump / 60m H / Pole vault / 1000m; 7.16 / 7.17 m / 9.46 m / 2.06 m / 8.39 / 3.00 m / 3:14.30					
5000 m walk	31:14.0	Mateo López Fidalgo	25 November 2006		Bompas, France	
5000 m walk	31:12.0 (Note: not ratified but recognised by World Athletics)	Kevin Poulet	25 November 2006		Bompas, France	
4 × 200 m relay	1:34.25	Pol Moya; Poulet; Vilchez; Pau Blasi	8 January 2017		Sabadell, Spain	
4 × 400 m relay	3:37.40	Gomez; Pol Moya; Vilchez; Pau Blasi	12 January 2020		Sabadell, Spain	

=== Women ===
Event	Record	Athlete	Date	Meet	Place	Ref.
60 m	7.73	Cristina Llovera	11 February 2018		Salamanca, Spain	
200 m	25.65	Estefania Sebastian	9 February 2014		Sabadell, Spain	
400 m	55.50	Duna Viñals	9 March 2024	Spanish U20 Championships	Salamanca, Spain	
800 m	2:14.62	Natalia Gallego	23 February 2008		Valencia, Spain	
1500 m	4:44.41	Silvia Felipo	30 January 2005		Vilafranca, Spain	
3000 m	10:09.24	Silvia Felipo	6 February 2005		Vilafranca, Spain	
60 m hurdles	9.43	Montserrat Pujol	10 March 2007		San Sebastián, Spain	
60 m hurdles	8.9 h	Montserrat Pujol	3 March 2001		Escaldes, Andorra	
High jump	1.81 m	Margarida Moreno	17 February 1990		San Sebastián, Spain	
Pole vault	2.75 m	Ariadna Argemi	15 December 2018		Andorra la Vella, Andorra	
Long jump	5.68 m	Montserrat Pujol	5 March 2005		Caldea, Andorra	
Long jump	5.68 m	Claudia Guri	14 February 2015		Antequera, Spain	
Triple jump	12.40 m	Claudia Guri	21 February 2015	Spanish Championships	Antequera, Spain	
Shot put	10.11 m	Lorena Alvarez	8 January 2006		Vilafranca, Spain	
Pentathlon	3222 pts	Claudia Guri	9 January 2016		Sabadell, Spain	
Pentathlon	60m H / High jump / Shot put / Long jump / 800m; 9.97 / 1.73 m / 8.47 m / 5.26 m / 2:41.87					
3000 m walk	24:09.1	Sandra Villacampa	25 November 2006		Bompas, France	
4 × 200 m relay	1:51.14	Andorra; Montserrat Pujol; Natalia Gallego; Sonia Villacampa; Yanire Sanchez	1 March 2008		San Sebastián, Spain	
4 × 400 m relay						
