= Manlio Molinari =

Personal information
- Born: 24 August 1964
- Height: 1.84 m (6 ft 0 in)
- Weight: 72 kg (159 lb)

Sport
- Sport: Athletics
- Events: 400 m, 800 m

Manlio Molinari (born 24 August 1964) is a retired Sammarinese athlete who competed in the 400 and 800 metres. He represented his country at four consecutive Summer Olympics, starting in 1984. Molinari was the flag bearer for San Marino in the 1996 Summer Olympics opening ceremony.

He still holds national records in several events.

== International competitions ==
Year	Competition	Venue	Position	Event	Notes
Representing San Marino
1984	Olympic Games	Los Angeles, United States	62nd (h)	800 m	1:57.09
1985	Games of the Small States of Europe	Serravalle, San Marino	3rd	400 m	51.26
1985	Games of the Small States of Europe	Serravalle, San Marino	2nd	800 m	1:53.69
1987	European Indoor Championships	Liévin, France	19th (h)	400 m	49.14
1987	Games of the Small States of Europe	Monaco	2nd	400 m	
1987	World Championships	Rome, Italy	39th (h)	800 m	1:53.41
1988	European Indoor Championships	Budapest, Hungary	18th (h)	400 m	49.14
1988	Olympic Games	Seoul, South Korea	54th (h)	800 m	1:52.35
1989	Games of the Small States of Europe	Cyprus	2nd	4 × 400 m relay	3:23.52
1991	Games of the Small States of Europe	Andorra	2nd	4 × 400 m relay	3:17.44
1991	Mediterranean Games	Athens, Greece	6th	4 × 400 m relay	3:24.38
1991	Universiade	Sheffield, United Kingdom	32nd (h)	400 m	49.85
1992	Olympic Games	Barcelona, Spain	21st (h)	4 × 100 m relay	42.08
1993	Games of the Small States of Europe	Malta	3rd	400 m	48.99
1993	Games of the Small States of Europe	Malta	2nd	800 m	1:52.08
1993	Games of the Small States of Europe	Malta	2nd	4 × 100 m relay	
1995	Games of the Small States of Europe	Luxembourg	1st	400 m	48.94
1995	Games of the Small States of Europe	Luxembourg	2nd	800 m	1:52.47
1996	Olympic Games	Atlanta, United States	52nd (h)	800 m	1:56.08
1997	Games of the Small States of Europe	Reykjavík, Iceland	3rd	400 m	51.17
1997	Games of the Small States of Europe	Reykjavík, Iceland	3rd	800 m	1:57.88
1997	World Championships	Athens, Greece	46th (h)	800 m	1:55.89
1999	Games of the Small States of Europe	Liechtenstein	3rd	4 × 100 m relay	42.84

== Personal bests ==
Outdoor

- 800 metres – 1:51.8 (San Marino 1997) NR
- 1000 metres – 2:30.9 (Riccione 1989) NR
- 110 metres hurdles – 16.52 (Modena 2000) NR
- 400 metres hurdles – 56.04 (Benevento 1991) ex-NR

Indoor

- 400 metres – 49.14 (Liévin 1987) NR
- 800 metres – 1:54.6 (Ancona 1987) NR
- 60 metres hurdles – 9.22 (Ancona 2000) NR
