= Andrea Ercolani Volta =

Sammarinese hurdler (born 1995)

Personal information
- Born: 20 April 1995 (age 31)
- Height: 1.82 m (6 ft 0 in)
- Weight: 73 kg (161 lb)

Sport
- Sport: Athletics
- Event: 400 metres hurdles
- Club: Olimpus San Marino Atletica

Andrea Ercolani Volta (born 20 April 1995) is a Sammarinese athlete specialising in the 400 metres hurdles. He has won several medals at the Games of the Small States of Europe.

His personal best in the event is 52.12 seconds, set in Marsa in 2023. This is the current national record.

== International competitions ==
Year	Competition	Venue	Position	Event	Notes
Representing San Marino
2011	World Youth Championships	Lille, France	77th (h)	200 m	24.69
2013	European Junior Championships	Rieti, Italy	23rd (h)	400 m hurdles	57.48
2014	World Junior Championships	Eugene, United States	53rd (h)	400 m hurdles	56.11
2015	Games of the Small States of Europe	Reykjavík, Iceland	2nd	400 m hurdles	45.11
2015	Games of the Small States of Europe	Reykjavík, Iceland	4th	4 × 100 m relay	3:37.60
2015	Games of the Small States of Europe	Reykjavík, Iceland	5th	4 × 400 m relay	3:37.60
2015	European U23 Championships	Tallinn, Estonia	22nd (h)	400 m hurdles	54.72
2017	Games of the Small States of Europe	Serravalle, San Marino	3rd	400 m hurdles	53.07
2017	Games of the Small States of Europe	Serravalle, San Marino	5th	4 × 400 m relay	3:23.28
2017	European U23 Championships	Bydgoszcz, Poland	24th (h)	400 m hurdles	53.45
2018	Mediterranean Games	Tarragona, Spain	14th (h)	400 m hurdles	53.14
2018	European Championships	Berlin, Germany	25th (h)	400 m hurdles	53.86
2019	Games of the Small States of Europe	Bar, Montenegro	2nd	400 m hurdles	53.48
2019	World Championships	Doha, Qatar	37th (h)	400 m hurdles	52.60
2021	Championships of the Small States of Europe	Serravalle, San Marino	1st	400 m hurdles	53.02
2021	Championships of the Small States of Europe	Serravalle, San Marino	5th	Medley relay	1:58.29
2022	Championships of the Small States of Europe	Marsa, Malta	9th	400 m	49.76
2022	Championships of the Small States of Europe	Marsa, Malta	–	Medley relay	DQ
2022	Mediterranean Games	Oran, Algeria	11th (h)	400 m hurdles	52.35
2022	European Championships	Munich, Germany	25th (h)	400 m hurdles	52.59
2023	Games of the Small States of Europe	Marsa, Malta	1st	400 m hurdles	52.12
2023	Games of the Small States of Europe	Marsa, Malta	5th	4 × 400 m relay	3:19.96
2023	World Championships	Budapest, Hungary	41st (h)	400 m hurdles	52.69
2024	Championships of the Small States of Europe	Gibraltar	3rd	400 m hurdles	53.71
2024	Championships of the Small States of Europe	Gibraltar	5th	Medley relay	1:57.02
2025	Games of the Small States of Europe	Andorra la Vella, Andorra	5th (h)	400 m hurdles	53.88
2025	Games of the Small States of Europe	Andorra la Vella, Andorra	5th	4 × 400 m relay	3:18.88
