= Alessandra Gasparelli =

Sammarinese sprinter (born 2004)

Personal information
- Born: 3 September 2004 (age 22) Borgo Maggiore, San Marino
- Height: 162 cm (5 ft 4 in)

Sport
- Country: San Marino
- Sport: Athletics
- Event: Sprint

Achievements and titles
- Personal bests: 100 m: 11.42 NR (Marsa 2026); 200 m: 23.65 NR (Modena 2024); Indoors; 60 m: 7.30 NR (Ancona 2026); 200 m: 23.87 NR (Ancona 2026)
Medal record
Women's athletics
Representing the San Marino
Championships of the Small States of Europe
Gold medal – first place	2022 Marsa	100 m
Gold medal – first place	2026 Monaco	100 m
Silver medal – second place	2026 Monaco	200 m
Games of the Small States of Europe
Silver medal – second place	2025 Andorra la Vella	100 m
Silver medal – second place	2025 Andorra la Vella	200 m
Bronze medal – third place	2023 Marsa	100 m
Bronze medal – third place	2023 Marsa	4 x 100 m
Mediterranean U23 Championships
Gold medal – first place	2024 Ismailia	100 m

Alessandra Gasparelli (born 3 September 2004) is a Sammarinese sprinter. She is the Sammarinese record holder in the 60 m, 100 m and 200 m. She competed over 100 m at the 2024 Olympic Games and over 60 m at the 2024 World Athletics Indoor Championships.

== Career ==
Gasparelli made her first major championship appearance at the European Team Championships Third League in the 100 m and 100 m hurdles. She followed this up by competing at the European U20 Championships in Tallinn, where she finished seventh in her heat and did not advance to the semi-finals.

In 2022, Gasparelli won the 100 m at the Championships of the Small States of Europe in a new personal best of 11.67s. Later that year, she competed in the 100 m at the 2022 World U20 Championships in Cali, she finished eighth in her heat with a time of 12.27s.

At the Games of the Small States of Europe in Marsa, Malta, Gasparelli placed third with a wind-assisted time of 11.47. She had set a wind-legal personal best of 11.57 in the heats.

In January 2024, Gasparelli ran a national record 7.37 seconds for the 60 m whilst competing in Ancona, Italy. She subsequently competed in the 60 m at the World Indoor Championships placing sixth in her heat with a time of 7.45s. She competed at the 2024 Paris Olympics in the 100 m and was her country's flagbearer for the opening ceremony. In her preliminary round, she finished 2nd with a time 11.62 to make it to the heats, where she ran a new Sanmarinese record of 11.54.

She reached the final of the 60 metres at the 2025 Balkan Indoor Athletics Championships in Belgrade, finishing seventh in a time of 7.46 seconds.

== Athletics achievements ==
Information from her World Athletics profile unless otherwise noted.

=== Personal bests ===
Type	Distance	Time (s)	Wind (m/s)	Venue	Date	Notes
Individual events
Indoor	60 metres	7.30	—N/a	Ancona, Italy	17 January 2026	NR
Indoor	200 metres sh	23.87	—N/a	Ancona, Italy	10 January 2026	NR
Indoor	60 metres hurdles	8.77	—N/a	Ancona, Italy	14 February 2021	
Outdoor	100 metres	11.42	+1.3	Marsa, Malta	9 May 2026	NR
Outdoor	150 metres	17.60	+1.3	Modena, Italy	1 May 2024	NR
Outdoor	200 metres	23.65	+1.0	Modena, Italy	5 May 2024	NR
Outdoor	400 metres	57.44	—N/a	Modena, Italy	25 April 2026	NR
Outdoor	100 metres hurdles	17.37	+1.3	Limassol, Cyprus	20 June 2021	
Outdoor	200 metres hurdles	29.66	—N/a	Misano Adriatico, Italy	10 April 2021	
Team events
Outdoor	4 × 100 metres relay	47.57	—N/a	Andorra la Vella, Andorra	31 May 2025	NR
Outdoor	Mixed 4 × 400 metres relay	3:41.52	—N/a	Serravalle, San Marino	13 April 2024	

=== International competitions ===
Representing San Marino
Year	Competition	Venue	Position	Event	Time	Notes
2021	Championships of the Small States of Europe	Serravalle, San Marino	5th	100 m	12.17	
2021	Championships of the Small States of Europe	Serravalle, San Marino	9th	200 m	25.98	
2021	European Team Championships Third League	Limassol, Cyprus	6th	100 m	12.27	
2021	European Team Championships Third League	Limassol, Cyprus	11th	100 m hurdles	17.37	
2021	European Team Championships Third League	Limassol, Cyprus	5th	4 x 100 m	49.52	
2021	European U20 Championships	Tallinn, Estonia	39th (h)	100 m	12.43	
2022	Balkan U20 Indoor Championships	Belgrade, Serbia	4th	60 m	7.54	
2022	Balkan Indoor Championships	Istanbul, Turkey	9th (h)	60 m	7.57	
2022	Championships of the Small States of Europe	Marsa, Malta	1st	100 m	11.67	PB
2022	Championships of the Small States of Europe	Marsa, Malta	5th	200 m	24.79	
2022	Mediterranean Games	Oran, Algeria	11th (h)	100 m	11.96	
2022	Mediterranean Games	Oran, Algeria	13th (h)	200 m	24.93	
2022	World U20 Championships	Cali, Colombia	54th (h)	100 m	12.27	
2023	Mediterranean U23 Indoor Championships	Valencia, Spain	5th	60 m	7.53	
2023	European Indoor Championships	Istanbul, Turkey	35th (h)	60 m	7.63	
2023	Games of the Small States of Europe	Marsa, Malta	3rd	100 m	11.47	
2023	Games of the Small States of Europe	Marsa, Malta	5th	200 m	24.44	NR
2023	Games of the Small States of Europe	Marsa, Malta	3rd	4 x 100 m	48.45	NR
2023	European Team Championships Third Division	Kraków, Poland	2nd	100 m	11.65	NU23R
2023	European Team Championships Third Division	Kraków, Poland	3rd	200 m	24.30	NR
2023	European Team Championships Third Division	Kraków, Poland	—	4 x 100 m	DQ	TR17.3.1
2023	European U20 Championships	Jerusalem, Israel	17th (h)	100 m	11.68	
2024	Balkan Indoor Championships	Istanbul, Turkey	7th	60 m	7.48	
2024	World Indoor Championships	Glasgow, United Kingdom	40th (h)	60 m	7.45	
2024	Mediterranean U23 Championships	Ismailia, Egypt	1st	100 m	11.42	
2024	Balkan Championships	İzmir, Turkey	7th	100 m	11.60	
2024	Balkan Championships	İzmir, Turkey	13th	200 m	24.76	
2024	European Championships	Rome, Italy	18th (h)	100 m	11.60	=SB
2024	Championships of the Small States of Europe	Gibraltar, British Overseas Territory	—	100 m	DNS	
2024	Olympic Games	Paris, France	52nd (h)	100 m	11.54	NR
2025	Balkan Indoor Championships	Belgrade, Serbia	7th	60 m	7.48	
2025	Games of the Small States of Europe	Andorra la Vella, Andorra	2nd	100 m	11.73	
2025	Games of the Small States of Europe	Andorra la Vella, Andorra	2nd	200 m	24.22	
2025	Games of the Small States of Europe	Andorra la Vella, Andorra	6th	4 x 100 m	47.57	NR
2025	European Team Championships Third Division	Maribor, Slovenia	1st	100 m	11.50	NR
2025	European Team Championships Third Division	Maribor, Slovenia	3rd	200 m	23.84	SB
2025	European Team Championships Third Division	Maribor, Slovenia	6th	4 x 100 m	47.81	SB
2025	European U23 Championships	Bergen, Norway	23rd (h)	100 m	11.82	
2025	European U23 Championships	Bergen, Norway	24th (h)	200 m	24.54	
2025	World Championships	Tokyo, Japan	51st (h)	100 m	11.78	
2026	Balkan Indoor Championships	Belgrade, Serbia	6th	60 m	7.41	
2026	World Indoor Championships	Toruń, Poland	45th (h)	60 m	7.51	
2026	European Challenger Championships	Fontvieille, Monaco	1st	100 m	11.81	
2026	European Challenger Championships	Fontvieille, Monaco	2nd	200 m	24.04	
2026	Balkan Championships	Volos, Greece	7th	100 m	11.58	
2026	European Championships	Birmingham, United Kingdom	21st (h)	100 m	11.60	
2026	Mediterranean Games	Taranto, Italy	12th (h)	100 m	12.14	
2026	Mediterranean Games	Taranto, Italy	11th (h)	200 m	24.18	
