= Danièle Kaber =

Luxembourgish long-distance runner (born 1960)

Danièle Kaber (born 20 April 1960) is a retired female long-distance runner from Luxembourg. She set her personal best (2:29:23) in the marathon at the 1988 Summer Olympics. Kaber is a three-time Luxembourgian Sportswoman of the Year (1985, 1986 and 1988).

== International competitions ==
Year	Competition	Venue	Position	Event	Notes
Representing Luxembourg
1985	Games of the Small States of Europe	Serravalle, San Marino	1st	1500 m	4:33.09
1986	European Championships	Stuttgart, West Germany	23rd (h)	3000 m	9:20.00
1986	European Championships	Stuttgart, West Germany	12th	10,000 m	32:16.97
1987	Games of the Small States of Europe	Monaco	3rd	800 m	2:13.73
1987	World Championships	Rome, Italy	27th (h)	10,000 m	34:24.52
1988	Olympic Games	Seoul, South Korea	7th	Marathon	2:29:23
1989	Games of the Small States of Europe	Nicosia, Cyprus	2nd	1500 m	4:34.94
1989	Games of the Small States of Europe	Nicosia, Cyprus	1st	3000 m	9:17.2
