= Pol Moya =

Andorran middle-distance runner

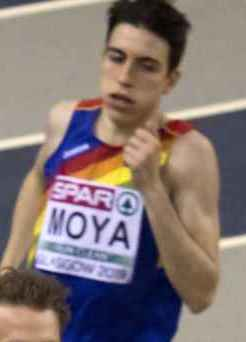
- Moya in 2019

Personal information
- Full name: Pol Moya Betriu
- Born: 9 December 1996 (age 29) La Seu d'Urgell, Lleida, Spain
- Height: 178 cm (5 ft 10 in)
- Weight: 62 kg (137 lb)

Sport
- Country: Andorra
- Sport: Athletics
- Event: 800 metres
- Club: Club Atletisme Valls d'Andorra
- Coached by: José Antonio Prieto

Pol Moya Betriu (Note: In this Catalan name, the first or paternal surname is Moya and the second or maternal family name is Betriu; both are generally joined by the conjunction "i".) (born 9 December 1996) is an Andorran middle-distance runner competing primarily in the 800 metres. He represented his country at the 2016 World Indoor Championships without qualifying for the final. He is the national record holder on several distances.

Moya represented Andorra at the 2016 Summer Olympics, but did not qualify for the final. He was the flag bearer for Andorra for the closing ceremonies.

Moya was born in Spain to Spanish parents. He is studying at the Polytechnic University of Catalonia.

== Competition record ==
Year	Competition	Venue	Position	Event	Notes
Representing Andorra
2014	World Junior Championships	Eugene, United States	47th (h)	800 m	1:58.44
2015	European Junior Championships	Eskilstuna, Sweden	26th (h)	800 m	1:56.04
2016	World Indoor Championships	Portland, United States	14th (h)	800 m i	1:54.19
2016	European Championships	Amsterdam, Netherlands	19th (h)	800 m	1:50.03
2016	Olympic Games	Rio de Janeiro, Brazil	37th (h)	800 m	1:48.88
2017	European Indoor Championships	Belgrade, Serbia	19th (h)	800 m i	1:50.88
2017	Games of the Small States of Europe	Serravalle, San Marino	3rd	800 m	1:50.72
2017	Games of the Small States of Europe	Serravalle, San Marino	2nd	1500 m	4:01.06
2017	European U23 Championships	Bydgoszcz, Poland	11th (h)	800 m	1:49.48
2017	World Championships	London, United Kingdom	37th (h)	800 m	1:49.06
2019	European Indoor Championships	Glasgow, United Kingdom	33rd (h)	800 m i	1:53.21
2019	World Championships	Doha, Qatar	37th (h)	800 m	1:48.52
2021	European Indoor Championships	Toruń, Poland	36th (h)	800 m i	1:51.97
2021	Olympic Games	Tokyo, Japan	37th (h)	800 m	1:47.44
2022	Ibero-American Championships	La Nucía, Spain	10th (h)	800 m	1:49.51
2022	Ibero-American Championships	La Nucía, Spain	3rd	1500 m	3:44.64
2022	Ibero-American Championships	La Nucía, Spain	6th	4 × 400 m relay	3:26.02
2022	Mediterranean Games	Oran, Algeria	15th (h)	800 m	1:49.39
2022	Mediterranean Games	Oran, Algeria	5th	1500 m	3:43.58
2023	European Indoor Championships	Istanbul, Turkey	7th (h)	1500 m i	3:42.23
2023	Games of the Small States of Europe	Marsa, Malta	2nd	800 m	1:50.37
2023	Games of the Small States of Europe	Marsa, Malta	1st	1500 m	3:41.10
2023	European Games	Chorzów, Poland	24th	800 m	1:49.57
2024	Championships of the Small States of Europe	Gibraltar	2nd	800 m	1:53.57
2024	Championships of the Small States of Europe	Gibraltar	1st	1500 m	4:04.86
2025	European Indoor Championships	Apeldoorn, Netherlands	13th (h)	1500 m i	3:41.48
2025	Games of the Small States of Europe	Andorra la Vella, Andorra	1st	800 m	1:47.85
2025	Games of the Small States of Europe	Andorra la Vella, Andorra	1st	1500 m	3:47.23
2025	Games of the Small States of Europe	Andorra la Vella, Andorra	4th	4 × 400 m relay	3:17.19
2026	World Indoor Championships	Toruń, Poland	23rd (h)	1500 m i	3:44.68
2026	Mediterranean Games	Taranto, Italy	8th	1500 m	3:43.96
2026	World Road Running Championships	Copenhagen, Denmark	31st	Road mile	4:01.91

== Personal bests ==
Outdoor

- 800 metres – 1:46.19 (Castellón 2023) NR
- 1000 metres – 2:23.34 (Olot 2020) NR
- 1500 metres – 3:35.60 (Nice 2024) NR

Indoor

- 800 metres – 1:48.86 (Sabadell 2017) NR
- 1500 metres – 3:40.10 (Madrid 2025) NR
- 3000 metres – 8:09.34 (Sabadell 2024)

== Notes ==
Olympic Games
Preceded by Irineu Esteve Altimiras	Flag bearer for Andorra; Tokyo 2020 with Mònica Dòria	Succeeded by Maeva Estevez
