= Jared Micallef =

Maltese athlete (born 1998)

Personal information
- Nationality: Maltese
- Born: 29 May 1998 (age 28) Australia

Sport
- Sport: Athletics
- Event: Middle distance running

Achievements and titles
- Personal bests: 800m: 1:46.0 (Perth, 2025) NR; 1500m: 3:44.48 (Marsa, 2023) NR
Medal record
Men's athletics
Representing Malta
Games of the Small States of Europe
Gold medal – first place	2023 Marsa	800m
Silver medal – second place	2025 Andorra la Vella	800m
Silver medal – second place	2025 Andorra la Vella	1500m
Silver medal – second place	2025 Andorra la Vella	4x400m relay
Silver medal – second place	2025 Andorra la Vella	4x400m mixed
Bronze medal – third place	2023 Marsa	1500m

Jared Micallef (born 29 May 1998) is a Maltese middle-distance runner. He represented Malta over 800 metres at the 2025 World Championships, and holds the Maltese national record over 800 metres and 1500 metres.

== Biography ==
Born in Australia of Maltese descent, his father and paternal grandparents left Valletta for Australia in the 1960s. he started running competitively at a young age but had to overcome a succession of injuries at the end of his teenage years. He was runner-up to Peter Bol over 800 metres at the Australian Athletics Championships in Sydney in April 2021. However, he declined the opportunity to run for the country of his birth at the delayed 2020 Olympic Games, opting instead to represent Malta at the international level in order to honour his family legacy.

In 2023, Micallef won the gold medal for Malta in the 800 metres at the 2023 Games of the Small States of Europe in Marsa, Malta, and also won the bronze medal in the 1500 metres at the Games, with a Maltese national record time of 3:44.48. Micallef also improved the 800m national record in Karlsruhe, Germany, that year, with a time of 1:46.50. He was named Maltese male athlete of the year for 2023. However, an injury suffered in June ruled him out of competitive action until the following March. He represented Malta at the 2024 European Athletics Championships in Rome, Italy, without advancing to the semi-finals.

In April 2025, he set a new Maltese national record for the 800 metres with a time of 1:46.08 in Perth. He won four silver medals at the 2025 Games of the Small States of Europe in Andorra; in the 800m, 1500m, the men's 4x400 relay, and the 4x400 mixed relay. He also served as one of Malta’s flagbearers at the Games.

Micallef represented Malta at the 2025 World Athletics Championships in Tokyo, Japan, in September 2025 in the men's 800 metres, running 1:46.62 without advancing to the semi-finals. However, the time was enough to meet the automatic qualification standard for the 2026 Commonwealth Games.

In August 2026, he competed at the 2026 European Athletics Championships in Birmingham, England, in the 800 metres.
