= Stefano Casali =

Sammarinese racewalker

Personal information
- Nationality: Sammarinese
- Born: 15 October 1962 (age 63)

Sport
- Sport: Athletics
- Event: Racewalking

Stefano Casali (born 15 October 1962) is a Sammarinese racewalker. He competed in the men's 20 kilometres walk at the 1980 Summer Olympics and the 1984 Summer Olympics.
