= Graziella Santini =

Sammarinese long jumper

Personal information
- Nationality: Sammarinese
- Born: 23 July 1960 (age 65)

Sport
- Sport: Athletics
- Event: Long jump

Graziella Santini (born 23 July 1960) is a Sammarinese athlete. She competed in the women's long jump at the 1976 Summer Olympics. She was the youngest member of the 1976 San Marino Olympic team, turning 16 on the day of her event. She was the first woman to represent San Marino at the Olympics.
