= Beppe Grillo (athlete) =

Beppe Grillo (born 25 June 2003) is a Maltese former sprinter. In the men's 100m at the 2024 Balkan Championships, Grillo set a Maltese national record, breaking the previous record set in 2014 by Kevin Moore. Grillo represented Malta at the 2024 Summer Olympics, being selected via Universality Place. In the men's 100m, he placed fifth in his heat and did not advance. He finished his heat with a time of 10.69 seconds, slower than his national record setting time of 10.23 seconds he set earlier that year in the Balkan Championships. At the 2025 World Athletics Indoor Championships, Grillo competed in the men's 60m and got a time of 6.87 seconds, which placed him 42nd out of 58 sprinters. Grillo announced his retirement from the sport on 5 February 2026, saying he was no longer "passionate about the sport" and rebuked accusations he failed a doping test.
