= Gian Luigi Macina =

Sammarinese long-distance runner

Personal information
- Nationality: Sammarinese
- Born: 17 December 1963 (age 62)

Sport
- Sport: Long-distance running
- Event: Marathon

Gian Luigi Macina (born 17 December 1963) is a Sammarinese long-distance runner. He competed in the men's marathon at the 1992 Summer Olympics and the 2000 Summer Olympics.
