= Giuseppina Grassi (athlete) =

Sammarinese high jumper

Personal information
- Nationality: Sammarinese
- Born: 28 January 1957 (age 69)

Sport
- Sport: Athletics
- Event: High jump

Giuseppina Grassi (born 28 January 1957) is a Sammarinese athlete. She competed in the women's high jump at the 1976 Summer Olympics.

At the time of her Olympic appearance, she was working as a corporate secretary and for her family's bar.
