= 2026 Balkan Athletics Indoor Championships =

- Dates: 21 February
- Host city: Belgrade, Serbia
- Venue: Atletska dvorana
- Level: Senior
- Events: 24

The 2026 Balkan Athletics Indoor Championships was the 30th edition of the annual indoor track and field competition for athletes from the Balkans, organised by Balkan Athletics. It was held on 21 February at the Atletska dvorana in Belgrade, Serbia.

== Medal summary ==
=== Men ===
Event	Gold		Silver		Bronze	
60 metres	Hristo Iliev; Bulgaria	6.53 CR, NR	Anej Čurin Prapotnik; Slovenia	6.57 NR	Ertan Özkan; Turkey	6.61
400 metres	Sorin Alexandru Voinea; Romania	47.12	Boško Kijanović; Serbia	47.29	Franko Burraj; Albania	47.30
800 metres	Abedin Mujezinović; Bosnia and Herzegovina	1:49.12	Ömer Faruk Bozdağ; Turkey	1:49.48	Benjamin Lakošeljac; Slovenia	1:49.60
1500 metres	Yervand Mkrtchyan; Armenia	3:42.29	Aldin Ćatović; Serbia	3:43.01	Rok Markelj; Slovenia	3:43.17 NR
3000 metres	Nino Jambrešić; Croatia	8:14.73	Vid Botolin; Slovenia	8:19.00	Kiyasettin Kara; Turkey	8:20.86
60 metres hurdles	Milan Trajkovic; Cyprus	7.71	Mikdat Sevler; Turkey	7.79	Oleh Kukota; Ukraine	7.89
4 × 400 metres relay	Turkey; Ilyas Çanakçı; Ihsan Selçuk; Eren Keser; Kubilay Encu	3:11.27	Slovenia; Maj Janža; Benjamin Lakošeljac; Filip Koležnik; Lovro Mesec Košir	3:11.61	Romania; David Ștefan Damian; Cristian Gabriel Voicu; Dragoș Ionuț Nastasa; Sorin Alexandru Voinea	3:12.04
High jump	Tihomir Ivanov; Bulgaria	2.19 m	Antonios Merlos; Greece	2.17 m	Kyrylo Lutsenko; Ukraine	2.17 m
Pole vault	Ilia Bobrovnik; Ukraine	5.45 m	Antonios Santas; Greece	5.45 m	Ivan Šerić; Croatia	5.35 m
Long jump	Bozhidar Sarâboyukov; Bulgaria	8.42 m CR	Miltiadis Tentoglou; Greece	8.14 m	Nikolaos Stamatonikolos; Greece	7.76 m
Triple jump	Gor Hovakimyan; Armenia	16.66 m	Necati Er; Turkey	16.53 m	Nikolaos Andrikopoulos; Greece	16.29 m
Shot put	Armin Sinančević; Serbia	20.59 m	Andrei Toader; Romania	20.02 m	Giorgi Mujaridze; Georgia	19.56 m

=== Women ===
Event	Gold		Silver		Bronze	
60 metres	Isabel Posch; Austria	7.29	Lucija Potnik; Slovenia	7.30	Dimitra Tsoukala; Greece	7.32
400 metres	Edanur Tulum; Turkey	54.17	Andrea Savova; Bulgaria	54.40	Elif Polat; Turkey	54.60
800 metres	Nina Vuković; Croatia	2:01.70	Georgia-Maria Despollari; Greece	2:02.70	Maša Rajić; Serbia	2:03.56
1500 metres	Ioulianna Roussou; Greece	4:20.96	Lotte Luise Seiler; Austria	4:22.53	Derya Kunur; Turkey	4:25.88
3000 metres	Sümeyye Erol; Turkey	9:30.10	Devora Avramova; Bulgaria	9:31.74	Milica Tomašević; Serbia	9:32.85
60 metres hurdles	Nika Glojnarič; Slovenia	8.11	Mia Wild; Croatia	8.24	Anisiya Lochman; Ukraine	8.29
4 × 400 metres relay	Croatia; Lara Jurčić; Nina Vuković; Laura Matko; Natalija Švenda	3:39.91	Serbia; Tara Vucković; Aleksandra Pešić; Minja Kopunović; Maša Rajić	3:4	Turkey; Elif Polat; Zeynep Özkara; Elif Ilgaz; Edanur Tulum	3:40.99
High jump	Marija Vuković; Montenegro	1.89 m	Federica Apostol; Romania	1.87 m	Lia Apostolovski; Bulgaria	1.87 m
Pole vault	Ariadni Adamopoulou; Greece	4.52 m	Olha Belchenko; Ukraine	4.30 m	Demet Parlak; Turkey	4.05 m
Long jump	Filippa Fotopoulou; Cyprus	6.49 m	Yasemin Zehra Börekçi; Turkey	6.48 m	Natalia Besi; Greece	6.28 m
Triple jump	Ivana Španović; Serbia	14.07 m	Elena Andreea Taloș; Romania	13.96 m	Neja Filipič; Slovenia	13.92 m
Shot put	Emel Dereli; Turkey	17.07 m	Maria Rafailidou; Greece	16.12 m	Olha Holodna; Ukraine	15.98 m

== Medal table ==
The host country is highlighted in lavender blue

Rank	Nation	Gold	Silver	Bronze	Total
1	Turkey*	4	4	6	14
2	Bulgaria	3	2	0	5
3	Croatia	3	1	1	5
4	Greece	2	5	4	11
5	Serbia	2	3	2	7
6	Cyprus	2	1	0	3
7	Armenia	2	0	0	2
8	Slovenia	1	4	4	9
9	Romania	1	3	1	5
10	Ukraine	1	1	4	6
11	Austria	1	1	0	2
12	Bosnia and Herzegovina	1	0	0	1
12	Montenegro	1	0	0	1
14	Albania	0	0	1	1
14	Georgia	0	0	1	1
Totals (15 entries)		24	25	24	73
