= 2024 Balkan Athletics Indoor Championships =

- Dates: 10 February
- Host city: Istanbul, Turkey
- Venue: Ataköy Athletics Arena
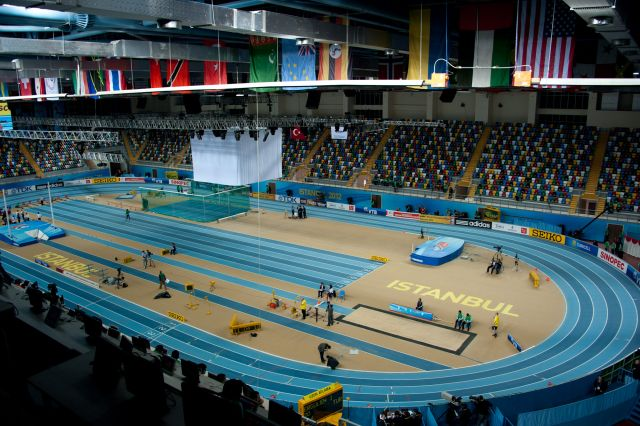
- Level: Senior
- Events: 24

The 2024 Balkan Athletics Indoor Championships was the 28th edition of the annual indoor track and field competition for athletes from the Balkans, organised by Balkan Athletics. It was held on 10 February at the Ataköy Athletics Arena in Istanbul, Turkey.

== Medal summary ==
=== Men ===
Event	Gold		Silver		Bronze	
60 metres	Anej Čurin Prapotnik; Slovenia	6.66	Ertan Özkan; Turkey	6.68	Aykut Ay; Turkey	6.71
400 metres	Berke Akçam; Turkey	46.43	Rok Ferlan; Slovenia	46.63	Franko Burraj; Albania	46.91
800 metres	Ömer Faruk Bozdağ; Turkey	1:47.74	Haridimos Xenidakis; Greece; Salih Teksöz; Turkey	1:48.10		1:51.75
1500 metres	Yervand Mkrtchyan; Armenia	3:44.55	Mehmet Çelik; Turkey	3:44.87	Abdurrahman Gediklioğlu; Turkey	3:45.67
3000 metres	Elzan Bibić; Serbia	8:07.85	Ivo Balabanov; Bulgaria	8:10.61	Aldin Ćatović; Serbia	8:12.76
60 metres hurdles	Filip Jakob Demšar; Slovenia	7.70	Mikdat Sevler; Turkey	7.74	Alin Ionuţ Anton; Romania	7.77
4 × 400 metres relay	Turkey; Yağız Canlı; Ilyas Çanakçı; Oğuzhan Kaya; Berke Akçam	3:12.09	Croatia; Lukas Cik; Marino Bloudek; Vito Kovačić; Roko Farkaš	3:23.69	Romania; Cristian Gabriel Voicu; Cristian Andrei Sava; Nicolae Marian Coman; Sorin Alexandru Voinea	3:34.96
High jump	Dmytro Nikitin; Ukraine	2.20 m	Kyryl Lutsenko; Ukraine	2.15 m	Valentin-Alexandru Androne; Romania	2.15 m
Pole vault	Ioannis Rizos; Greece	5.40 m	Oleksandr Onufriyev; Ukraine	5.20 m	Ivan Horvat; Croatia	5.20 m
Long jump	Luka Ćurković; Croatia	7.81 m	Andreas Trajkovski; North Macedonia	7.79 m	Bozhidar Sarâboyukov; Bulgaria	7.74 m
Triple jump	Can Özüpek; Turkey	16.48 m	Levon Aghasyan; Armenia	16.28 m	Nikolaos Andrikopoulos; Greece	16.25 m
Shot put	Mesud Pezer; Bosnia and Herzegovina	20.75 m	Odisseas Mouzenidis; Greece	19.25 m	Giorgi Mujaridze; Georgia	19.19 m

=== Women ===
Event	Gold		Silver		Bronze	
60 metres	Polyniki Emmanoulidou; Greece	7.30	Mia Wild; Croatia	7.42	Simay Özçiftçi; Turkey	7.42
400 metres	Alexandra Stefania Uta; Romania	54.6	Edanur Tulum; Turkey	54.9	Sila Koloğlu; Turkey	55.3
800 metres	Nina Vuković; Croatia	2:01.75	Caroline Bredlinger; Austria	2:01.76	Veronika Sadek; Slovenia	2:03.40
1500 metres	Luiza Gega; Albania	4:15.84	Burcu Subatan; Turkey	4:17.95	Koraini Kyriakopoulou; Greece	4:19.12
3000 metres	Luiza Gega; Albania	9:07.03	Pelinsu Şahin; Turkey	9:13.18	Anastasia Marinakou; Greece	9:14.06
60 metres hurdles	Nika Glojnarič; Slovenia	8.08	Mia Wild; Croatia	8.13	Anja Lukić; Serbia	8.16
4 × 400 metres relay	Turkey; Elif Polat; Sila Koloğlu; Büşra Yıldırım; Edanur Tulum	3:46.80	Croatia; Lorena Faktor; Klara Andrijašević; Olja Galić; Nicole Milić	3:54.54	Albania; Beqiri Iljana; Paola Shyle; Relaksa Dauti; Zhuljeta Cejku	4:07.72
High jump	Mirela Demireva; Bulgaria	1.89 m	Daniela Stanciu; Romania	1.86 m	Panagiota Dosi; Greece	1.86 m
Pole vault	Yana Hladiychuk; Ukraine	4.40 m	Eleni-Klaoudia Polak; Greece	4.30 m	Ariadni Adamopoulou; Greece	4.30 m
Long jump	Florentina Costina Iusco; Romania	6.64 m	Iryna Nerubalshchuk; Ukraine	6.36 m	Plamena Mitkova; Bulgaria	6.31 m
Triple jump	Elena Andreea Taloș; Romania	13.89 m	Gizem Akgöz; Turkey	13.75 m	Viktoriya Baranivska; Ukraine	13.71 m
Shot put	Dimitriana Bezede; Moldova	17.86 m	Emel Dereli; Turkey	16.80 m	Maria Maggoulia; Greece	16.04 m

== Medal table ==
The host country is highlighted in lavender blue

Rank	Nation	Gold	Silver	Bronze	Total
1	Turkey*	5	9	4	18
2	Romania	3	2	2	7
3	Slovenia	3	1	1	5
4	Croatia	2	4	1	7
5	Greece	2	3	6	11
6	Ukraine	2	2	2	6
7	Albania	2	0	2	4
8	Bulgaria	1	1	2	4
9	Armenia	1	1	0	2
10	Serbia	1	0	2	3
11	Bosnia and Herzegovina	1	0	0	1
11	Moldova	1	0	0	1
13	Austria	0	1	0	1
13	North Macedonia	0	1	0	1
15	Georgia	0	0	1	1
Totals (15 entries)		24	25	23	72
