= 2026 Balkan Athletics Championships =

- Dates: 20–21 June
- Host city: Volos, Greece
- Venue: Panthessaliko Stadium
- Level: Senior
- Events: 43

The 2026 Balkan Athletics Championships was the 81st edition of the annual track and field competition for athletes from the Balkans, organised by Balkan Athletics. It was held at the Panthessaliko Stadium on 20 and 21 June in Volos, Greece.

== Medal summary ==
=== Men ===
Event	Gold		Silver		Bronze	
100 metres (wind: +1.3 m/s)	Hristo Iliev (BUL)	10.25	Panagiotis Laganis (GRE)	10.42	Ertan Özkan (TUR)	10.46
200 metres	Sotirios Garaganis (GRE)	20.73	Kubilay Encu (TUR)	20.79	Vasileos Myrianthopoulos (GRE)	20.82
400 metres	Kubilay Ençü (TUR)	45.42	Mihai Sorin Dringo (ROM)	45.57	Oleksandr Pohorilko (UKR)	45.76
800 metres	Jared Micallef (MLT)	1:46.93	Ömer Faruk Bozdağ (TUR)	1:47.11	Abedin Mujezinovic (BIH)	1:47.69
1500 metres	Salih Teksöz (TUR)	3:38.75	Nino Jambrešić (CRO)	3:40.78	Aldin Ćatović (SRB)	3:41.74
3000 metres	Yervand Mkrtchyan (ARM)	7:52.75	Mert Selek (TUR)	7:53.10	Elzan Bibić (SRB)	7:57.59
5000 metres	Mert Selek (TUR)	14:08.09	Konstadinos Stamoulis (GRE)	14:25.17	Orfeas Ioannou (GRE)	14:38.55
110 metres hurdles	Dmytro Bahinskiy (UKR)	13.62	Milan Trajkovic (CYP)	13.70	Hristos Roumtsios (GRE)	13.75
400 metres hurdles	İsmail Nezir (TUR)	48.33	Niklas Strohmayer-Dangl (AUT)	49.55	Mihajlo Katanić (SRB)	49.66
3000 metres Steeplechase	Bruno Belčić (CRO)	8:40.05	Abdullah Tuğluk (TUR)	8:40.17	Cuma Özcan (TUR)	8:41.25
4 × 100 metres relay	Turkey; Ertan Özkan; Kayhan Özer; Batuhan Altıntaş; Deniz Kaan Kartal	39.05	Greece; Theodoros Vrontinos; Nikolaos Panayiotopoulos; Sotirios Garagganis; Vasilios Mirianthópoulos	39.32	Bulgaria; Georgi Petkov; Nikola Karamanolov; Zinga Barbosa Firmino; Hristo Iliev	39.36
4 × 400 metres relay	Turkey; Ilyas Çanakçi; Kubilay Ençü; Ihsan Selçuk; İsmail Nezir	3:03.04 CR	Slovenia; Maj Janja; Rok Ferlan; Mitja Zubin; Lovro Mesec Košir	3:04.13	Ukraine; Oleksandr Pohorilko; Mykyta Barabanov; Volodymyr Vovchenko; Anton Smiian	3:05.57
High jump	Andreas Mita (GRE)	2.20	Yasir Kuduban (TUR)	2.12	Tihomir Ivanov (BUL)	2.12
Pole vault	Erdem Tilki (TUR)	5.45	Ivan Šerić (CRO)	5.45	Valentyn Loboda (UKR)	5.45
Long jump	Miltiadis Tentoglou (GRE)	8.36	Luka Bošković (SRB)	8.19	Bozhidar Sarâboyukov (BUL)	8.04
Triple jump	Can Özüpek (TUR)	16.46	Razmik Ghazaryan (ARM)	16.20	Dimitrios Tsiamis (GRE)	16.18
Shot put	Mesud Pezer (BIH)	20.29	Andrei Toader (ROM)	19.95	Armin Sinančević (SRB)	19.85
Discus Throw	Alin Firfirica (ROM)	63.49	Ömer Şahin (TUR)	60.75	Dimitrios Pavlidis (GRE)	59.92
Hammer Throw	Christos Frantzeskakis (GRE)	77.22	Markelo Mema (ALB)	76.57	Iosef Kesides (CYP)	76.56
Javelin Throw	Dimitrios Tsitsos (GRE)	78.68	Georgios Christakakos (GRE)	71.79	Hüseyin Özdemir (TUR)	71.54
Decathlon	Angelos-Tzanis Andreoglou (GRE)	7864	Konstantinos Karagiannidis (GRE)	7551	Krum Zakhariev (BUL)	7387

=== Women ===
Event	Gold		Silver		Bronze	
100 metres (wind: +0.6 m/s)	Magdalena Lindner (AUT)	11.40	Simay Özçiftçi (TUR)	11.44	Isabel Posch (AUT)	11.45
200 metres	Polyniki Emmanouilidou (GRE)	23.26	Elif Polat (TUR)	23.27	Sila Koloğlu (TUR)	23.31
400 metres	Andrea Miklos (ROM)	52.26	Stefania Balint (ROM)	52.66	Anastasia Rapti (GRE)	52.82
800 metres	Nina Vuković (CRO)	2:01.76	Georgia-Maria Despollari (GRE)	2:02.14	Emmanouela Plaka (GRE)	2:02.16
1500 metres	Ioulianna Roussou (GRE)	4:20.09	Anthi Kyryakopoulou (GRE)	4:20.30	Tuğba Toptaş (TUR)	4:20.71
3000 metres	Edibe Yağiz (TUR)	9:36.27	Gresa Bakraqi (KOS)	9:37.26	Melissa Anastasakis (GRE)	9:38.68
5000 metres	Edibe Yağiz (TUR)	16:17.50	Gresa Bakraqi (KOS)	16:26.85	Denisa Balla (GRE)	16:32.05
100 metres hurdles	Militsa Emini (SRB)	13.22	Sofia Iosifidou (GRE)	13.30	Mia Wild (CRO)	13.45
400 metres hurdles	Lena Pressler (AUT)	55.36	Alina Kyshkina (UKR)	56.96	Natalija Švenda (CRO)	57.12
3000 metres steeplechase	Andreea Stavila (MDA)	9:40.41	Sümeyye Erol (TUR)	9:46.21	Nikoleta Rafailaki (GRE)	9:58.76
4 × 100 metres relay	Greece; Apostolia Antonatou; Sofia Kaberidou; Rafailia Spanoudaki-Hatziriga; Poliniki Emmanouilidou	44.09	Turkey; Büşra Akay; Simay Özçiftçi; Bahar Öztürk; Beyzanur Seylan	44.74	Serbia; Milica Emini; Tamara Milutinović; Anja Lukić; Milana Tirnanić	45.36
4 × 400 metres relay	Slovenia; Ajda Kaučič; Karolina Zbičajnik; Uršula Černelč; Maja Pogorevc	3:35.57	Greece; Rafailia Giannoulidou; Ioulianna Roussou; Ekaterini Grigoriadou; Anastasia Rapti	3:38.05	Israel; Nitzan Asas; Darlene Asante; Noa Levi; Shani Zakay	3:38.70
High jump	Marija Vuković (MNE)	1.88	Panagiota Dosi (GRE)	1.86	Styliana Ioannidou (CYP)	1.84
Pole vault	Ekaterini Stefanidi (GRE)	4.48	Ariadni Adamopoulou (GRE)	4.48	Yarden Mantel (ISR)	3.90
Long jump	Ramona Elena Verman (ROM)	6.78	Alina Rotaru-Kottmann (ROM)	6.78	Filippa Fotopoulou (CYP)	6.54
Triple jump	Spiridoula Karidi (GRE)	14.09	Oxana Koreneva (GRE)	14.00	Iuliana Dabija (MDA)	13.66
Shot put	Emel Dereli (TUR)	17.33	Maria Rafailidou (GRE)	16.24	Vesna Kljajević (MNE)	15.00
Discus Throw	Özlem Becerek (TUR)	59.10	Alexandra Emilianov (MDA)	58.10	Chrysoula Anagnostopoulou (CRO)	56.71
Hammer Throw	Iryna Klymets (UKR)	68.50	Yipsi Moreno (ALB)	67.85	Hanna Skydan (AZE)	64.55
Javelin Throw	Esra Türkmen (TUR)	61.10	Elina Tzengko (GRE)	57.88	Marija Vučenović (SRB)	57.48
Heptathlon	Tetyana Bilyk (UKR)	6061	Anastasia Baloumi (GRE)	5326	Anđela Drobnjak (MNE)	4686

=== Mixed ===
Event	Gold		Silver		Bronze	
4 × 400 metres relay	Romania; Mihai Sorin Dringo; Stefania Balint; Sorin Alexandru Voinea; Andrea Miklos	3:18.58	Greece; Kyriakos Tsikilis; Georgia-Maria Despollari; Vladímiros Andreádis; Rafailia Giannoulidou	3:24.18	Bulgaria; Dimitar Hristov; Rosina Nikolova; Todor Todorov; Andrea Savova	3:30.28

== Medal table ==
* Host nation (Greece)

Rank	Nation	Gold	Silver	Bronze	Total
1	Turkey	13	10	5	28
2	Greece*	11	16	12	39
3	Romania	4	4	0	8
4	Ukraine	3	1	3	7
5	Croatia	2	2	1	5
6	Austria	2	1	1	4
7	Serbia	1	1	6	8
8	Moldova	1	1	1	3
9	Armenia	1	1	0	2
9	Slovenia	1	1	0	2
11	Bulgaria	1	0	5	6
12	Montenegro	1	0	2	3
13	Bosnia and Herzegovina	1	0	1	2
14	Malta	1	0	0	1
15	Albania	0	2	0	2
15	Kosovo	0	2	0	2
17	Cyprus	0	1	3	4
18	Israel	0	0	2	2
19	Azerbaijan	0	0	1	1
Totals (19 entries)		43	43	43	129
