= 2023 European Athletics Team Championships First Division =

Athletics team competitions

- Host city: (Poland) Chorzów, Silesia
- Events: 37 (19 men, 19 women, 1 mixed)
- Dates: 23–25 June 2023
- Main venue: Silesian Stadium

Below are the full startlists and, when confirmed, results of the 2023 European Athletics Team Championships First Division on 23–25 June 2023 in Kraków, Poland. This edition marks the first time all divisions of the Championships had been held at a single venue. European Athletics released the full and final startlists on 16 June 2023, one week before the event. The previous Super League has been expanded to sixteen teams, and renamed the 'First Division'.

For the first time, medals will also be awarded for individual performances across all three divisions, as part of the 2023 European Games.

== Format ==
The winner of each individual discipline and each relay shall score 16 points, the second will score one fewer, and so on. National teams, athletes or relay teams with no valid performance, disqualified or not finishing shall not score. If two or more athletes tie for a place in any event, the attributable points shall be divided equally between them. The team having the highest aggregate number of points shall be the winner of the event, and win both the gold medal and the Championship trophy.

After the conclusion of the athletics program of the European Games 2023, the following relegation and promotion is to be made for the next edition of the European Athletics Team Championships in Malaga in 2025

- the three lowest ranked teams of the First Division are relegated to the Second Division.
- the three highest ranked teams of the Second Division are then promoted to the First Division.

Races below 1500 metres will be raced in two heats, with the results amalgamated to find a final order in the event. There will be no finals in these events. In races from 1500 metres upwards, one heat of 16 will take part. In the field events, each event will be broken into two pools. Both heats and pools will be seeded so that the highest ranked athletes compete together, with the exception of the final relays, which will be seeded by overall standings one hour before the event.

== Schedule ==
The following is the schedule of events for the First Division match.

Schedule for individual events : EATC First Division
DAY 1 PM - 23 June			DAY 2 PM - 24 June			DAY 3 PM - 25 June	
Shot put	W	15:10	Hammer throw	M	15:30	Javelin throw	W
Hammer throw	W	15:20	Long jump	M	15:35	High jump A	M
400m	W	15:55	Pole vault	W	15:35	High jump B	M
Shot put F	W	15:55	Pole vault	W	16:05	200m	W
Triple jump	M	16:05	110m hurdles	M	16:25	200m	M
Hammer throw F	W	16:15	Hammer throw F	M	16:28	Shot put	M
400m	M	16:25	100m hurdles	W	16:34	Javelin throw F	W
5000m	W	16:36	Long jump F	M	16:55	Long jump	W
Discus throw	W	16:50	800m	W	17:05	3000m SC	W
Pole vault A	M	17:10	1500m	M	17:25	High jump A	W
Pole vault B	M	17:15	Discus throw	M	17:25	High jump B	W
800m	M	17:26	Triple jump	W	17:27	Shot put F	M
Triple jump F	M	17:40	400m hurdles	W	17:33	Javelin throw	M
3000m SC	M	18:05	400m hurdles	M	17:40	5000m	M
Discus throw F	W	18:20	Discus throw F	M	18:10	Long jump F	W
100m	W	18:30	4 × 100 m	W	18:20	1500m	W
100m	M	18:41	Triple jump F	W	18:38	Javelin throw F	M
		18:50	4 × 100 m	M	18:45	4 × 400 m mixed	X

== Overall standings ==
Rank	Nation	Points
1	Italy	426.50
2	Poland	402.50
3	Germany	387.50
4	Spain	352.00
5	Great Britain	341.00
6	Netherlands	339.50
7	France	337.50
8	Portugal	315.00
9	Czech Republic	303.50
10	Sweden	283.00
11	Finland	282.50
12	Switzerland	263.00
13	Greece	256.50
14	Belgium	250.00
15	Turkey	245.00
16	Norway	223.00

== Men's events ==
Key: WR= world record - ER = European Record - EL = 2023 European lead - CR = Championships record
Where (gold) , (silver) and (bronze) medals are indicated in notes, these are European Games individual medals across all divisions.

=== 100 metres men ===
Rank	Heat	Lane	Athlete	Result	Notes	Entry PB
1	A	4	Samuele Ceccarelli (ITA)	10.13	(gold) =PB	10.13
2	A	5	Raphael Bouju (NED)	10.14	2nd place, silver medalist(s)	10.02
3	A	9	Jeremiah Azu (GBR)	10.16	(bronze) =SB	10.13
4	A	6	Dominik Kopeć (POL)	10.21		10.20
5	A	8	Robin Ganter (GER)	10.28		10.16
6	B	8	Ioannis Nyfantopoulos (GRE)	10.30	SB	10.28
7	B	5	Pascal Mancini (SUI)	10.31 (.305)		10.20
8	A	4	Jimmy Vicaut (FRA)	10.31 (.309)		9.86
9	B	4	Kayhan Özer (TUR)	10.32		10.24
10	B	2	Carlos Nascimento (POR)	10.38 (.374)	SB	10.13
11	A	7	Samuli Samuelsson (FIN)	10.38 (.376)		10.16
12	B	7	Sergio López (ESP)	10.40		10.27
13	B	6	Jan Veleba (CZE)	10.48		10.16
14	A	2	Kobe Vleminckx (BEL)	10.51		10.23
15	B	9	Desmond Rogo (SWE)	10.55		10.45
16	B	3	Jacob Vaula (NOR)	10.63		10.46
Wind: +0.6 m/s (Heat A) -0.5 m/s (Heat B)		WR: (Jamaica) Usain Bolt - 9.58; ER: (Italy) Marcell Jacobs 9.80 EL: (United Kingdom) Eugene Amo-Dadzie 9.93; CR: (France) Christophe Lemaitre 9.95				

=== 200 metres men ===
Rank	Heat	Lane	Athlete	Result	Notes	Entry PB
1	A	7	Ryan Zeze (FRA)	20.29	(gold) SB	20.26
2	A	9	Albert Komański (POL)	20.50	2nd place, silver medalist(s)	20.49
3	A	6	Filippo Tortu (ITA)	20.61		20.10
4	A	8	Taymir Burnet (NED)	20.70		20.34
5	A	3	Timothé Mumenthaler (SUI)	20.76		20.50
6	B	2	Pol Retamal (ESP)	20.86	SB	20.28
7	A	4	Robin Ganter (GER)	20.89		~~20.33~~ (Note: This time is the listed personal best for Germany's original entry of Joshua Hartmann (GER) for the men's 200 metres)
8	B	8	Viljami Kaasalainen (FIN)	21.17		20.90
9	A	2	Jan Jirka (CZE)	21.18 (.173)		20.45
10	B	4	Ioannis Granitsiotis (GRE)	21.18 (.178)		20.84
=11	A	5	Adam Clayton (GBR)	21.18 (.180)		20.49
=11	B	5	Delvis Santos (POR)	21.18 (.180)	SB	20.74
13	B	9	Batuhan Altıntaş (TUR)	21.19		21.00
14	B	7	Mathias Hove Johansen (NOR)	21.27		20.68
15	B	6	Christian Iguacel (BEL)	21.34		20.90i
16	B	3	Desmond Rogo (SWE)	21.46		20.87
Wind: -1.3 m/s (Heat A) -0.4 m/s (Heat B)		WR: (Jamaica) Usain Bolt - 19.19; ER: (Italy) Pietro Mennea 19.72 EL: (United Kingdom) Zharnel Hughes 20.14; CR: (Turkey) Ramil Guliyev 20.20				

=== 400 metres men ===
Rank	Heat	Lane	Athlete	Result	Notes	Entry PB
1	A	8	Håvard Bentdal Ingvaldsen (NOR)	44.88	(gold) CR	45.94
2	A	7	João Coelho (POR)	45.05	(silver) NR	45.22
3	A	5	Liemarvin Bonevacia (NED)	45.06	(bronze) SB	44.48
4	A	4	Manuel Sanders (GER)	45.24	PB	45.36
5	A	9	Alex Haydock-Wilson (GBR)	45.25	SB	45.08
6	A	6	David Sombe (FRA)	45.49		45.32
7	A	2	Iñaki Cañal (ESP)	45.51	PB	45.56
8	B	8	Lorenzo Benati (ITA)	45.53	PB	45.62
9	B	7	Matěj Krsek (CZE)	45.75	SB	45.55
10	B	5	Lionel Spitz (SUI)	45.81		45.46
11	A	3	Dylan Borlée (BEL)	45.84		44.56
12	B	6	Karol Zalewski (POL)	45.95		45.11
13	B	4	Viljami Kaasalainen (FIN)	46.88	SB	46.54
14	B	9	İlyas Çanakçı (TUR)	47.23		46.48
15	B	2	Kasper Kadestål (SWE)	47.27		46.61
16	B	3	Georgios Lampropoulos (GRE)	48.28		47.24
WR: (South Africa) Wayde van Niekerk - 43.03; ER: (East Germany) Thomas Schönlebe 44.33 EL: (Norway) HåvardIngvaldsen 44.86; CR: (Belgium) Jonathan Borlée 44.99

=== 800 metres men ===
Rank	Heat	Athlete	Result	Notes	Entry PB
1st place, gold medalist(s)	B	Ramon Wipfli (SUI)	1:46.73	PB	1:47.64
2nd place, silver medalist(s)	B	Filip Šnejdr (CZE)	1:46.84		1:45.56
3rd place, bronze medalist(s)	B	Mehmet Çelik (TUR)	1:46.84	PB	1:47.21
4	B	Bram Buigel (NED)	1:46.90		1:46.63
5	A	Andreas Kramer (SWE)	1:46.92		1:44.47
6	A	Ben Pattison (GBR)	1:46.94		1:44.60
7	A	Mateusz Borkowski (POL)	1:47.18		1:44.79
8	A	Adrián Ben (ESP)	1:47.36		1:44.18
9	A	Yanis Meziane (FRA)	1:47.39		1:44.78
10	B	José Carlos Pinto (POR)	1:47.76	SB	1:46.61
11	A	Catalin Tecuceanu (ITA)	1:47.81		1:44.83
12	B	Charidimos Xenidakis (GRE)	1:47.91	PB	1:48.63
13	A	Luis Oberbeck (GER)	1:47.97		1:46.35
14	A	Joonas Rinne (FIN)	1:48.43		1:45.88
15	B	Pieter Claus (BEL)	1:50.03		1:47.17
16	B	Andreas Grimerud (NOR)	1:54.83		1:45.67
WR: (Kenya) David Rudisha - 1:40.91; ER: (Denmark) Wilson Kipketer 1:41.11 EL: (France) Benjamin Robert 1:43.48; CR: (Italy) Giordano Benedetti 1:45.11

=== 1500 metres men ===
Rank	Athlete	Result	Notes	Entry PB
1st place, gold medalist(s)	Mohamed Katir (ESP)	3:36.95	CR	3:28.76
2nd place, silver medalist(s)	Isaac Nader (POR)	3:37.37		3:34.00
3rd place, bronze medalist(s)	Niels Laros (NED)	3:37.59		3:38.34
4	Pietro Arese (ITA)	3:38.13		3:33.56
5	George Mills (GBR)	3:38.17		3:33.16
6	Emil Danielsson (SWE)	3:38.34		3:36.88
7	Filip Ostrowski (POL)	3:38.80		3:36.03
8	Romain Mornet (FRA)	3:39.17		3:34.29
9	Jakub Davidík (CZE)	3:40.76		3:39.47
10	Stijn Baeten (BEL)	3:41.53		3:36.52
11	Santtu Heikkinen (FIN)	3:41.72		3:39.86
12	İbrahim Erata (TUR)	3:43.55		3:39.94
13	Esten Hansen-Møllerud Hauen (NOR)	3:43.78		3:38.87
14	Silas Zurfluh (SUI)	3:43.81		3:35.62
15	Amos Bartelsmeyer (GER)	3:48.59		3:34.39
16	Sergios Diakostefanis (GRE)	3:50.57		3:47.99
WR: (Morocco) Hicham El Guerrouj - 3:26.00; ER: (Norway) Jakob Ingebrigtsen 3:27.95 EL: (Norway) Jakob Ingebrigtsen 3:27.95; CR: (Czech Republic) Jakub Holusa 3:37.74

=== 5000 metres men ===
Rank	Athlete	Result	Notes	Entry PB
1	Thierry Ndikumwenayo (ESP)	13:25.48	1st place, gold medalist(s)	12:59.03
2	Andreas Almgren (SWE)	13:25.70	(silver) SB	13:01.70
3	Yemaneberhan Crippa (ITA)	13:34.29	(bronze) SB	13:02.26
4	Alexis Miellet (FRA)	13:51.88		13:22.55
5	Jonathan Davies (GBR)	13:56.11		13:16.66
6	Awet Nftalem Kibrab (NOR)	13:58.39		13:18.59
7	Ramazan Özdemir (TUR)	14:00.71	SB	13:37.58
8	Mateusz Gos (POL)	14:01.67		13:52.61
9	Enzo Noel (BEL)	14:02.78		13:49.59
10	Eemil Helander (FIN)	14:07.73		13:45.49
11	Robin van Riel (NED)	14:13.89	PB	14:17.01
12	Florian Bremm (GER)	14:14.87		13:30.87
13	Martin Zajíc (CZE)	14:15.57		13:58.25
14	Leon Berthold (SUI)	14:16.88	SB	
15	Marios Anagnostou (GRE)	14:17.29		14:06.94
16	Rúben Amaral (POR)	14:48.70		13:46.01
WR: (Uganda) Joshua Cheptegei - 12:35.36; ER: (Norway) Jakob Ingebrigtsen 12:48.45 EL: (Spain) Mohamed Katir 12:52.09; CR: (Italy) Yermane'e Crippa 13:17.23

=== 3000 metres steeplechase men ===
Rank	Athlete	Result	Notes	Entry PB
1st place, gold medalist(s)	Daniel Arce (ESP)	8:25.88		8:10.63
2nd place, silver medalist(s)	Emil Blomberg (SWE)	8:26.27		8:20.01
3rd place, bronze medalist(s)	Zak Seddon (GBR)	8:27.42		8:21.28
4	Osama Zoghlami (ITA)	8:30.09		8:11.00
5	Frederik Ruppert (GER)	8:32.99		8:15.58
6	Tom Erling Kårbø (NOR)	8:34.10	SB	8:26.12
7	Michael Curti (SUI)	8:35.12		8:30.89
8	Clément Deflandre (BEL)	8:36.23		8:32.30
9	David Foller (CZE)	8:38.82	PB	8:39.94
10	Topi Raitanen (FIN)	8:39.93		8:16.57
11	Nick Marsman (NED)	8:39.97	PB	8:50.26
12	Maciej Megier (POL)	8:45.85		8:35.50
13	Valentin Bresc (FRA)	8:45.98		8:31.07
14	Etson Barros (POR)	8:53.47		8:22.20
15	Nestoras Kolios (GRE)	8:53.81		8:51.13
-	Turgay Bayram (TUR)	DQ		8:35.73
WR: (Ethiopia) Lamecha Girma - 7:52.11; ER: (France) M M-Benabbad 8:00.09 EL: (Spain) Daniel Arce 8:10.63; CR: (Spain) Yoann Kowal 8:25.50

=== 110 metres hurdles men ===
Rank	Heat	Lane	Athlete	Result	Notes	Entry PB
1	A	4	Jason Joseph (SUI)	13.12	(gold) CR	13.10
2	A	7	Enrique Llopis (ESP)	13.44	3rd place, bronze medalist(s)	13.30
3	A	6	Hassane Fofana (ITA)	13.47		13.42
4	A	3	Pascal Martinot-Lagarde (FRA)	13.58		12.95
5	A	5	Joshua Zeller (GBR)	13.59		13.19
6	A	2	Max Hrelja (SWE)	13.62		13.50
7	A	9	Elmo Lakka (FIN)	13.67 (.661)		13.31
8	B	6	Manuel Mordi (GER)	13.67 (.662)		13.64
9	A	8	Krzysztof Kiljan (POL)	13.72		13.62
10	B	4	Mikdat Sevler (TUR)	13.82		13.36
11	B	8	Sisínio Ambriz (POR)	13.85	EU20L TR 16.5.3	13.90
12	B	5	Konstantinos Douvalidis (GRE)	13.90		13.33
13	B	7	Timme Koster (NED)	13.91		13.65
14	B	3	Nolan Vancauwemberghe (BEL)	14.00		13.75
15	B	9	Sander Skotheim (NOR)	14.31		14.16
16	B	2	Štěpán Schubert (CZE)	14.52		13.86
Wind: +0.4 m/s (Heat A) +0.1 m/s (Heat B)		WR: (United States) Aries Merritt – 12.80; ER: (United Kingdom) Colin Jackson 12.91 EL: (France) Just Kwaou-Mathey 13.09; CR: (Russia) Sergey Shubenkov 13.20				

=== 400 metres hurdles men ===
Rank	Heat	Lane	Athlete	Result	Notes	Entry PB
1	A	8	Alessandro Sibilio (ITA)	48.14	(gold) CR	47.93
2	B	6	İsmail Nezir (TUR)	48.84	(bronze) EU23L	48.84
3	A	5	Nick Smidt (NED)	48.95		48.70
4	A	4	Seamus Derbyshire (GBR)	49.51		49.29
5	A	9	Julien Watrin (BEL)	49.56		48.66
6	A	3	Dany Brand (SUI)	49.97 (.962)		48.96
7	B	8	Krzysztof Hołub (POL)	49.97 (.964)	PB	50.12
8	A	7	Vít Müller (CZE)	50.05		49.14
9	B	7	Karl Wållgren (SWE)	50.18		50.11
10	B	4	Tuomas Lehtonen (FIN)	50.20	PB	50.53
11	A	2	Clement Ducos (FRA)	50.29		49.65
12	B	5	Jesús David Delgado (ESP)	50.78		49.53
13	B	9	Yuben Munary Gonçalves (POR)	50.79	PB	51.13
14	B	3	Dimitris Levantinos (GRE)	51.29		51.19
	A	6	Joshua Abuaku (GER)	DNF		48.55
			Bastian Elnan Aurstad (NOR)	DNS		51.66
WR: (Norway) Karsten Warholm - 45.94; ER: (Norway) Karsten Warholm 45.94 EL: (Norway) Karsten Warholm 46.42; CR: (Norway) Karsten Warholm 48.46

=== High jump ===
Rank	Group	Athlete	1.95	2.00	2.05	2.09	2.13	2.17	2.20	2.23	2.26	2.29	2.32	2.34	Height	Notes	Entry PB
1	A	Gianmarco Tamberi (ITA)	-	-	-	-	-	o	-	o	xo	o	xx-	x	2.29	SB	2.33
2	A	Thomas Carmoy (BEL)	-	-	-	o	o	o	o	o	xo	xo	xx		2.29	=PB	2.29i
3	A	Norbert Kobielski (POL)	-	-	-	-	o	o	o	xo	xo	xx			2.26		2.29i
4	A	Tobias Potye (GER)	-	-	-	-	xo	o	xo	o	xo	x			2.26		2.30
5	B	Jan Štefela (CZE)	-	o	o	o	o	xo	xo	xx					2.20	SB	2.24i
6	A	Ali Eren Ünlü (TUR)	-	-	o	o	o	xxo	xo	x					2.20		2.23
7	B	Gerson Baldé (POR)	-	o	o	o	o	o	xxx						2.17		2.23
8=	A	Douwe Amels (NED)	-	-	-	-	o	-	xx-	x					2.13		2.31i
8=	B	Daniel Kosonen (FIN)	-	-	-	o	o	xxx							2.13		2.22i
10	A	Antonios Merlos (GRE)	-	-	o	xxo	o	xx							2.13		2.23
11	B	Fabian Delryd (SWE)	-	-	o	o	xxo	xx							2.13		2.33
12=	B	Carlos Rojas (ESP)	-	o	o	o	xxx								2.09		2.26
12=	B	Sébastien Micheau (FRA)	-	-	o	o	xxx								2.09		2.23
14	A	William Grimsey (GBR)	-	-	xo	xo	xx								2.09		2.25
15	B	Noam Pritchett (SUI)	o	o	xo	xxx									2.05		2.07
16	B	Sander Skotheim (NOR)	-	xo	-	-	xxx								2.00		2.20i
WR: (Cuba) Javier Sotomayor - 2.45; ER: (Sweden) Patrik Sjoberg 2.42 EL: (Poland) Norbert Kobielski 2.27; CR: (Ukraine) Dmytro Demyanyuk 2.35

=== Pole vault ===
Rank	Group	Athlete	4.90	5.10	5.30	5.45	5.55	5.65	5.70	5.75	5.80	5.85	5.90	Height	Notes	Entry PB
1	A	Menno Vloon (NED)	-	-	-	o	-	xo	-	xo	x-	o	xxx	5.85	1st place, gold medalist(s)	5.96i
2	A	Emmanouil Karalis (GRE)	-	-	-	o	-	o	-	o	o	xxx		5.80	2nd place, silver medalist(s)	5.86i
3	A	Thibaut Collet (FRA)	-	-	-	o	-	xo	o	-	o	xxx		5.80	3rd place, bronze medalist(s)	5.82
4	A	Piotr Lisek (POL)	-	-	-	o	-	o	-	o	xo	xxx		5.80		6.02
5	A	Claudio Michel Stecchi (ITA)	-	-	-	o	xo	o	-	xo	xo	x		5.80		5.82
6=	B	Gillian Ladwig (GER)	-	-	o	-	o	o	xxx					5.65		5.72
6=	B	Pedro Buaró (POR)	-	o	o	o	o	o	xxx					5.65	PB	5.51
8	A	Pål Haugen Lillefosse (NOR)	-	-	-	xo	-	xxo	x					5.65		5.86
9	B	Juho Alasaari (FIN)	-	-	o	o	xxx							5.45		5.60
10	A	Ben Broeders (BEL)	-	-	-	xo	-	xxx						5.45		5.85
11	A	Ersu Şaşma (TUR)	-	-	o	xxo	xx							5.45		5.80
12	B	Valentin Imsand (SUI)	-	o	xo	xxo	x							5.45		5.61
13=	B	Adam Hague (GBR)	-	o	xxo	xx								5.30	=SB	5.65i
13=	B	Dan Bárta (CZE)	-	o	xxo	xx								5.30		5.53
15	B	William Asker (SWE)	o	o	xxx									5.10		5.25i
16	B	Isidro Leyva (ESP)	o	xxo	-	xx								5.10		5.55i
WR: (Sweden) Armand Duplantis 6.23; ER: (Sweden) Armand Duplantis 6.23 EL: (Sweden) Armand Duplantis 6.23; CR: (France) Renaud Lavillenie 6.01

=== Long jump ===
Rank	Athlete	1	2	3	4	5	6	Result	Notes	Entry PB
1	Miltiadis Tentoglou (GRE)	8.08	x	7.95	x	8.07	8.34	8.34	(gold) EL	8.60
2	Mattia Furlani (ITA)	7.75	7.97	x	x	—	x	7.97	2nd place, silver medalist(s)	8.24
3	Simon Ehammer (SUI)	7.67	7.95	7.91	x	7.89	7.87	7.95	3rd place, bronze medalist(s)	8.45
4	Thobias Montler (SWE)	7.82	7.70	x	7.52	—	x	7.82		8.38i
5	Héctor Santos (ESP)	x	7.72	x	x	7.77	DNA	7.77		8.19
6	Kristian Pulli (FIN)	x	7.70	—	—	—	DNA	7.70		8.27
7	Sander Skotheim (NOR)	7.67	—	—	x	x	DNA	7.67		7.74
8	David Cairo (NED)	7.63	x	7.08	x	7.52	DNA	7.63		7.66i
9	Jack Roach (GBR)	x	7.60	7.47	Did not advance			7.60		7.83
10	Radek Juška (CZE)	x	x	7.59	Did not advance			7.59		8.31
11	Simon Batz (GER)	7.52	x	7.48	Did not advance			7.52		7.91i
12	Ivo Tavares (POR)	7.31	7.40	x	Did not advance			7.40		8.05
13	Mateusz Jopek (POL)	7.37	7.14	7.24	Did not advance			7.37		7.95
14	Yanni Sampson (BEL)	x	7.24	6.77	Did not advance			7.24		7.47
15	Necati Er (TUR)	x	7.10	x	Did not advance			7.10		8.02
	Tom Campagne (FRA)	x	x	—	Did not advance			NM		8.12
WR: (United States) Mike Powell - 8.95; ER: (Soviet Union) Robert Emmiyan 8.86 EL: (Switzerland) Simon Ehammer 8.32; CR: (Greece) Miltiadis Tentoglou 8.38

=== Triple jump ===
Rank	Athlete	1	2	3	4	5	6	Result	Notes	Entry PB
1	Tobia Bocchi (ITA)	16.48	16.78	16.84	x	x	x	16.84	1st place, gold medalist(s)	17.26
2	Necati Er (TUR)	16.57	x	x	16.48	16.71	x	16.71	(silver) SB	17.37
3	Dimitrios Tsiamis (GRE)	15.97	16.38	16.26	x	—	x	16.38		17.55
4	Tiago Pereira (POR)	x	x	16.32	x	x	15.74	16.32		
5	Jude Bright-Davies (GBR)	16.24	15.56	x	x	15.80	DNA	16.24		16.28
6	Jonathan Seremes (FRA)	15.59	16.24	x	15.13	15.58	DNA	16.24		16.57i
7	Aaro Davidila (FIN)	15.76	x	15.68	x	16.04	DNA	16.04	PB	16.03i
8	Adrian Świderski (POL)	15.67	15.57	x	15.75	x	DNA	15.75		16.81
9	Pablo Torrijos (ESP)	15.27	15.57	15.57	Did not advance			15.57		17.18i
10	Gabriel Wallmark (SWE)	x	15.57	15.54	Did not advance			15.57	SB	16.43
11	Baboucar Sallah-Mohammed (NED)	14.74	x	14.84	Did not advance			14.84		15.92i
12	Carlos Kouassi (SUI)	14.12	14.10	14.40	Did not advance			14.40		15.76i
13	Sondre Vie Ytrearne (NOR)	14.20	14.23	x	Did not advance			14.23		15.18i
14	Jakub Kunt (CZE)	x	14.18	x	Did not advance			14.18		15.86
15	Björn De Decker (BEL)	x	13.84	14.08	Did not advance			14.08		15.27
16	Tim Lübbert (GER)	14.08	x	x	Did not advance			14.08		
WR: (United Kingdom) Jonathan Edwards - 18.29; ER: (United Kingdom) Jonathan Edwards 18.29 EL: (Italy) Andy Diaz Hernandez 17.75; CR: (Portugal) Nelson Evora 17.59

=== Shot put ===
Rank	Athlete	1	2	3	4	5	6	Result	Notes	Entry PB
1	Zane Weir (ITA)	20.26	21.59	x	x	21.02	21.22	21.59	1st place, gold medalist(s)	22.06i
2	Scott Lincoln (GBR)	20.30	20.22	21.01	21.10	20.58	x	21.10	(bronze) SB	21.28
3	Michał Haratyk (POL)	20.38	20.35	20.85	x	x	20.89	20.89		22.32
4	Tomáš Staněk (CZE)	x	19.49	20.03	19.43	20.47	x	20.47		22.17i
5	Carlos Tobalina (ESP)	18.65	20.19	19.79	19.81	19.76	DNA	20.19		20.57
6	Marcus Thomsen (NOR)	19.26	20.00	19.92	19.68	19.73	DNA	20.00		21.09i
7	Fred Moudani-Likibi (FRA)	19.25	19.65	x	x	x	DNA	19.65		20.54
8	Francisco Belo (POR)	18.55	19.03	19.64	x	x	DNA	19.64		21.28i
9	Xaver Hastenrath (GER)	18.24	19.14	18.52	Did not advance			19.14		19.40
10	Wictor Petersson (SWE)	19.06	x	x	Did not advance			19.06		21.15i
11	Odysseas Mouzenidis (GRE)	18.98	x	x	Did not advance			18.98		19.92
12	Stefan Wieland (SUI)	18.04	17.91	18.50	Did not advance			18.50		19.21
13	Sven Poelmann (NED)	17.85	18.04	x	Did not advance			18.04		20.31
14	Nuh Bolat (TUR)	17.93	x	x	Did not advance			17.93		19.10
15	Nico Oksanen (FIN)	17.03	x	17.36	Did not advance			17.36		18.69
16	Andreas De Lathauwer (BEL)	16.67	16.15	16.67	Did not advance			16.67		18.02i
WR: (United States) Ryan Crouser - 23.56; ER: (East Germany) Ulf Timmermann 23.06 EL: (Italy) Zane Weir 21.74; CR: (Poland) Michal Haratyk 21.83

=== Discus throw ===
Rank	Athlete	1	2	3	4	5	6	Result	Notes	Entry PB
1	Daniel Ståhl (SWE)	67.25	x	x	x	x	x	67.25	2nd place, silver medalist(s)	71.86
2	Henrik Janssen (GER)	62.11	62.16	59.33	61.62	64.09	x	64.09		66.42
3	Robert Urbanek (POL)	60.17	60.19	61.97	x	60.20	61.47	61.97		66.93
4	Yasiel Sotero (ESP)	58.05	60.35	61.19	58.89	x	x	61.19		64.68
5	Lawrence Okoye (GBR)	58.91	x	60.93	59.43	59.44	DNA	60.93		68.24
6	Michal Forejt (CZE)	58.78	58.49	59.90	x	x	DNA	59.90		61.28
7	Alessio Mannucci (ITA)	55.94	58.25	58.42	59.66	58.52	DNA	59.66		62.73
8	Emanuel Sousa (POR)	58.76	x	x	59.40	59.44	DNA	59.44		60.84
9	Sven Martin Skagestad (NOR)	x	56.36	58.29	Did not advance			58.29		65.20
10	Jordan Guehaseim (FRA)	x	56.39	58.29	Did not advance			58.29		62.90
11	Ömer Şahin (TUR)	x	53.55	57.75	Did not advance			57.75		60.16
12	Ruben Rolvink (NED)	56.36	x	x	Did not advance			56.36		62.79
13	Antti Pränni (FIN)	55.36	54.76	x	Did not advance			55.36		57.57
14	Gian Vetterli (SUI)	51.21	54.29	x	Did not advance			54.29	PB	53.97
15	Lars Coene (BEL)	50.52	x	49.22	Did not advance			50.52		56.55
16	Dimitrios Pavlidis (GRE)	x	45.79	x	Did not advance			45.79		64.90
WR: (East Germany) Jurgen Schult - 74.08; ER: (East Germany) Jurgen Schult 74.08 EL: (Slovenia) Kristjan Ceh 71.86; CR: (Estonia) Gerd Kanter 68.76

=== Hammer throw men ===
Rank	Athlete	1	2	3	4	5	6	Result	Notes	Entry PB
1	Wojciech Nowicki (POL)	77.53	77.68	79.61	78.21	x	79.28	79.61	1st place, gold medalist(s)	82.52
2	Thomas Mardal (NOR)	72.97	75.64	76.50	75.35	75.33	74.59	76.50	3rd place, bronze medalist(s)	77.46
3	Michail Anastasakis (GRE)	68.97	72.87	74.12	74.12	x	73.60	74.12		77.72
4	Merlin Hummel (GER)	69.49	73.89	70.61	x	72.75	73.99	73.99		76.28
5	Aaron Kangas (FIN)	70.91	71.80	72.39	x	x	DNA	72.39		79.05
6	Décio Andrade (POR)	72.03	x	71.85	x	x	DNA	72.03		73.77
7	Jake Norris (GBR)	71.93	71.96	71.98	71.23	x	DNA	71.98		73.43
8	Jan Doležálek (CZE)	70.47	x	x	x	x	DNA	70.47		71.77
9	Ragnar Carlsson (SWE)	x	69.61	x	Did not advance			69.61		77.00
10	Halil Yılmazer (TUR)	69.30	x	67.53	Did not advance			69.30		73.90
11	Giorgio Olivieri (ITA)	68.85	68.35	x	Did not advance			68.85		74.39
12	Alberto González (ESP)	65.05	68.07	68.23	Did not advance			68.23		75.78
13	Lukas Baroke (SUI)	x	61.34	x	Did not advance			61.34		66.78
14	Dennis Hemelaar (NED)	57.89	x	x	Did not advance			57.89		64.39
15	Rémi Malengreaux (BEL)	56.67	x	x	Did not advance			56.67		67.10
	Yann Chaussinand (FRA)	x	x	x	Did not advance			NM		77.34
WR: (Soviet Union) Yuriy Sedykh - 86.74; ER: (Soviet Union) Yuriy Sedykh 86.74 EL: (Poland) Wojciech Nowicki 81.92; CR: (Poland) Pawel Fajdek 82.98

=== Javelin throw men ===
Rank	Athlete	1	2	3	4	5	6	Result	Notes	Entry PB
1	Julian Weber (GER)	86.26	83.98	x	x	81.41	x	86.26	1st place, gold medalist(s)	89.54
2	Timothy Herman (BEL)	73.26	78.33	x	x	79.69	81.67	81.67		87.35
3	Leandro Ramos (POR)	77.94	x	76.05	x	79.68	81.62	81.62	SB	84.78
4	Dawid Wegner (POL)	73.08	75.49	76.40	81.40	77.68	77.47	81.40		82.21
5	Ioannis Kyriazis (GRE)	79.01	78.13	x	76.08	x	DNA	79.01		88.01
6	Jakob Samuelsson (SWE)	76.03	75.70	76.66	75.43	78.68	DNA	78.68		80.26
7	Manu Quijera (ESP)	74.82	74.74	74.43	75.06	75.08	DNA	75.08		83.28
8	Taneli Juutinen (FIN)	70.04	72.45	74.84	x	73.83	DNA	74.84		77.83
9	Emin Öncel (TUR)	70.14	74.18	71.21	Did not advance			74.18		81.37
10	Thomas van Ophem (NED)	x	70.94	70.42	Did not advance			70.94		80.70
11	Martin Konečný (CZE)	70.80	70.64	69.28	Did not advance			70.80		80.06
12	Joe Dunderdale (GBR)	69.85	65.10	x	Did not advance			69.85		76.13
13	Felise Vahai Sosaia (FRA)	69.50	69.08	65.07	Did not advance			69.50		82.04
14	Michele Fina (ITA)	69.47	67.62	68.50	Did not advance			69.47		75.52
15	Franck Di Sanza (SUI)	x	61.95	68.78	Did not advance			68.78		71.94
16	Daniel Thrana (NOR)	67.16	67.76	65.90	Did not advance			67.76		78.80
WR: (Czech Republic) Jan Zelezny - 98.48; ER: (Czech Republic) Jan Zelezny 98.48 EL: (Czech Republic) Jakub Vadlejch 89.51; CR: (Germany) Johannes Vetter 96.29

=== 4 x 100 metres relay men ===
Rank	Heat	Lane	Team	Athletes	Result	Notes	Entry NR
1	A	8	Germany	Julian Wagner, Marvin Schulte, Joshua Hartmann, Yannick Wolf	38.34	(gold) SB	37.97
2	A	7	Italy	Lorenzo Patta, Samuele Ceccarelli, Marco Ricci, Filippo Tortu	38.47	(silver) SB	37.50
3	B	8	France	Dylan Rigot, Jeff Erius, Ryan Zeze, Jimmy Vicaut	38.51	(bronze) SB	37.79
4	A	5	Netherlands	Xavi Mo-Ajok, Taymir Burnet, Hensley Paulina, Raphael Bouju	38.77	SB	37.91
5	A	9	Spain	Amau Monne, Sergio López, Pablo Montalvo, Bernat Canet	38.83	SB	38.46
6	A	4	Poland	Mateusz Siuda, Przemysław Słowikowski, Łukasz Żok, Dominik Kopeć	38.94	SB	38.15
7	B	7	Turkey	Ertan Özkan, Kayhan Özer, Batuhan Altıntaş, Ramil Guliyev	38.96	SB	37.98
8	B	6	Czech Republic	Zdeněk Stromšík, Jan Veleba, Jan Jirka, Jiří Polák	39.17	SB	38.62
9	B	9	Greece	Theodoros Vrontinos, Konstantinos Douvalidis, Ioannis Granitsiotis, Ioannis Nyfantopoulos	39.34	SB	38.61
10	B	4	Belgium	Rendel Vermeulen, Antoine Snyders, Jordan Paquot, Kobe Vleminckx	39.41	SB	38.73
11	A	2	Portugal	Carlos Nascimento, Gabriel Maia, Delvis Santos, André Prazeres	39.74	SB	38.65
12	B	3	Sweden	Jean-Christian Zirignon, Desmond Rogo, Zion Eriksson, Linus Pihl	39.99	SB	38.63
13	B	5	Switzerland	Pascal Mancini, Timothé Mumenthaler, Felix Svensson, Enrico Güntert	51.58	SB	38.36
	A	6	Great Britain	Jeremiah Azu, Oliver Bromby, Richard Kilty, Tommy Ramdhan	DQ	TR17.3.1	37.36
	B	2	Norway	Sander Skotheim, Jacob Vaula, Mathias Hove Johansen, Håvard Bentdal Ingvaldsen	DQ	TR24.7	38.96
	A	3	Finland	Samuli Samuelsson, Riku Illukka, Roope Saarinen, Santeri Örn	DQ	TR24.6	38.92
WR: Jamaica - 36.94; ER: (United Kingdom) Great Britain and N.I. 37.36 EL: France 38.22; CR: (United Kingdom) Great Britain and N.I. 38.08

== Women's events ==
=== 100 metres women ===
Rank	Heat	Lane	Athlete	Result	Notes	Entry PB
1	A	4	Ewa Swoboda (POL)	11.09	(gold) CR	11.03
2	A	7	Rani Rosius (BEL)	11.20	(silver) =PB	11.20
3	A	2	N'Ketia Seedo (NED)	11.24	3rd place, bronze medalist(s)	11.15
4	B	4	Jaël Bestué (ESP)	11.25	SB	11.19
5	A	8	Géraldine Frey (SUI)	11.26		11.22
6	A	9	Bianca Williams (GBR)	11.29	SB	11.17
7	A	3	Polyniki Emmanouilidou (GRE)	11.30		11.21
8	A	6	Arialis Gandulla (POR)	11.33		11.17
9	A	5	Lisa Mayer (GER)	11.36		11.12
10	B	3	Karolína Maňasová (CZE)	11.44		11.42
11	B	8	Lotta Kemppinen (FIN)	11.45 (.441)	TR16.5.3	11.33
12	B	5	Zaynab Dosso (ITA)	11.45 (.446)	SB	11.19
13	B	7	Helene Rønningen (NOR)	11.51		11.38
14	B	2	Julia Henriksson (SWE)	11.52		11.37
15	B	6	Carolle Zahi (FRA)	11.64	TR16.5.3	11.01
16	B	9	Elif Polat (TUR)	11.84		11.52
Wind: +0.1 m/s (Heat A) +0.1 m/s (Heat B)		WR: (United States) F Griffith-Joyner - 10.49; ER: (France) Christine Aaron 10.73 EL: (United Kingdom) Daryll Neita 10.97; CR: (Bulgaria) Ivet Lalova-Collio 11.11				

=== 200 metres women ===
Rank	Heat	Lane	Athlete	Result	Notes	Entry PB
1	A	6	Lieke Klaver (NED)	22.46	(gold) PB	22.51
2	A	5	Bianca Williams (GBR)	22.75	(bronze) SB	22.58
3	A	8	Polyniki Emmanouilidou (GRE)	22.85	PB	22.94
4	A	7	Anna Kiełbasińska (POL)	22.92	SB	22.76
5	B	6	Dalia Kaddari (ITA)	23.08	SB	22.64
6	A	9	Arialis Gandulla (POR)	23.12		23.05
7	A	4	Gémima Joseph (FRA)	23.13		22.77
8	B	9	Julia Henriksson (SWE)	23.22	SB	23.31
9	A	2	Paula Sevilla (ESP)	23.23		22.86
10	B	8	Imke Vervaet (BEL)	23.27		23.05
11	B	5	Lada Vondrová (CZE)	23.44		23.28
12	B	4	Christine Bjelland Jensen (NOR)	23.48		23.37
13	B	7	Géraldine Frey (SUI)	23.57		22.80
14	A	3	Alexandra Burghardt (GER)	23.61		23.00
15	B	3	Simay Özçiftçi (TUR)	23.77	PB	23.80
16	B	2	Aino Pulkkinen (FIN)	23.80		23.55i
Wind: +1.2 m/s (Heat A) -0.3 m/s (Heat B)		WR: (United States) F Griffith Joyner - 21.34; ER: (Netherlands) Dafne Schippers 21.63 EL: (United Kingdom) Daryll Neita 22.23; CR: (Netherlands) Dafne Schippers 22.45				

=== 400 metres women ===
Results of the women's 400 metres
Rank	Heat	Lane	Athlete (nation)	Time	Notes
1st place, gold medalist(s)	A	6	Femke Bol (NED)	49.82	CR
2nd place, silver medalist(s)	A	7	Natalia Kaczmarek (POL)	50.34	
3rd place, bronze medalist(s)	A	8	Cynthia Bolingo (BEL)	50.95	SB
4	A	5	Ama Pipi (GBR)	51.10	SB
5	A	2	Tereza Petržilková (CZE)	51.51	PB
6	A	4	Alice Mangione (ITA)	51.55	SB
7	B	7	Henriette Jæger (NOR)	51.66	PB
8	A	9	Cátia Azevedo (POR)	51.93	
9	B	5	Giulia Senn (SUI)	52.22	PB
10	A	3	Laura Müller (GER)	52.32	
11	B	4	Amandine Brossier (FRA)	52.60	SB
12	B	8	Mette Baas (FIN)	52.87	
13	B	3	Lisa Lilja (SWE)	53.00	PB
14	B	6	Laura Bueno (ESP)	53.38	
15	B	2	Edanur Tulum (TUR)	53.52	PB
16	B	9	Eirini Vasileiou (GRE)	53.90	
WR: (East Germany) Marita Koch - 47.60; ER: (East Germany) Marita Koch 47.60 EL: (Republic of Ireland) Rhasidat Adeleke 49.20; CR: (Netherlands) Femke Bol 50.37

=== 800 metres women ===
Rank	Heat	Lane	Athlete	Result	Notes	Entry PB
1	A	4	Audrey Werro (SUI)	1:59.95		1:59.53
2	A	3	Isabelle Boffey (GBR)	2:00.39		2:00.18
3	A	7	Majtie Kolberg (GER)	2:00.72		1:59.24
4	A	6	Eveliina Määttänen (FIN)	2:00.79		1:59.96
5	A	9	Lorea Ibarzabal (ESP)	2:00.86		2:00.17
6=	A	2	Eloisa Coiro (ITA)	2:01.03 (.028)		2:00.50
6=	A	5	Léna Kandissounon (FRA)	2:01.03 (.028)		1:59.65
8	A	8	Patricia Silva (POR)	2:01.82		2:00.07
9	B	6	Camille Laus (BEL)	2:02.28		2:01.99
10	B	3	Georgia-Maria Despollari (GRE)	2:02.31	PB	2:04.54
11	B	7	Wilma Nielsen (SWE)	2:02.60		2:02.11
12	B	4	Hedda Hynne (NOR)	2:03.12	SB	1:58.10
13	B	2	Tuğba Toptaş (TUR)	2:03.63	PB	2:04.84
14	B	5	Angelika Sarna (POL)	2:03.97		1:59.72
15	B	9	Kimberley Ficenec (CZE)	2:04.68		2:02.24
16	B	8	Amina Maatoug (NED)	2:08.03		2:03.45i
WR: (Czechoslovakia) Jarmila Kratochvilova - 1:53.28; ER: (Czechoslovakia) Jarmila Kratochvilova 1:53.28 EL: (United Kingdom) Keely Hodgkinson 1:55.77; CR: (Ukraine) Yuliya Krevsun 1:58.62

=== 1500 metres women ===
Rank	Athlete	Result	Notes	Entry PB
1	Esther Guerrero (ESP)	4:11.77		4:02.41
2	Martyna Galant (POL)	4:11.78		4:05.03
3	Hanna Klein (GER)	4:12.14		4:02.58
4	Sintayehu Vissa (ITA)	4:12.62		4:01.98
5	Lore Hoffmann (SUI)	4:12.88		4:07.09
6	Kristiina Mäki (CZE)	4:12.90		4:01.23
7	Marta Pen Freitas (POR)	4:13.50		4:03.79
8	Agathe Guillemot (FRA)	4:13.71		4:05.70
9	Hanna Hermansson (SWE)	4:13.73		4:05.76
10	Marissa Damink (NED)	4:14.47		4:08.41
11	Elise Vanderelst (BEL)	4:14.63		4:02.63
12	Şilan Ayyıldız (TUR)	4:16.06		4:10.59
13	Ellie Baker (GBR)	4:16.81		4:03.95
14	Nathalie Blomqvist (FIN)	4:17.10		4:10.25
15	Kristine Eikrem Engeset (NOR)	4:19.27	SB	4:09.40
16	Dafni-Eftychia-Tereza Lavasa (GRE)	4:22.55		4:22.24
WR: (Kenya) Faith Kepyegon 3:49.118; ER: (Netherlands) Sifan Hassan 3:51.95 EL: (United Kingdom) Laura Muir 3:57.09; CR: (Ukraine) Anna Mishchenko 4:05.32

=== 5000 metres women ===
Rank	Athlete	Result	Notes	Entry PB
1	Nadia Battocletti (ITA)	15:25.09	2nd place, silver medalist(s)	14:46.29
2	Hannah Nuttall (GBR)	15:29.49	3rd place, bronze medalist(s)	15:25.28
3	Águeda Marqués (ESP)	15:31.04		15:25.12
4	Kristine Eikrem Engeset (NOR)	15:32.77		15:26.00
5	Lea Meyer (GER)	15:33.75		15:06.39
6	Mariana Machado (POR)	15:33.93		15:15.56
7	Camilla Richardsson (FIN)	15:34.74	SB	15:16.71
8	Manon Trapp (FRA)	15:41.69		15:22.32
9	Aneta Konieczek (POL)	15:43.35	PB	15:50.70
10	Lisa Rooms (BEL)	15:44.24		15:26.27
11	Vera Sjöberg (SWE)	15:53.81	PB	15:59.72
12	Nicole Egger (SUI)	15:55.95	SB	15:52.34
13	Fatma Karasu (TUR)	15:56.63	PB	16:44.98
14	Maria Kassou (GRE)	16:05.00		16:02.74
15	Tereza Hrochová (CZE)	16:34.52	SB	16:00.61
16	Femke Rosbergen (NED)	17:12.67		15:57.88
WR: (Kenya) Faith Kipyegon 14:05.20; ER: (Netherlands) Sifan Hassan 14:22.12 EL: (United Kingdom) Laura Muir 14:48.14; CR: (Turkey) Elvan Abeylegesse 15:09.31

=== 3000 metres steeplechase women ===
Rank	Athlete	Result	Notes	Entry PB
1	Alicja Konieczek (POL)	9:38.72		9:25.15
2	Flavie Renouard (FRA)	9:40.40		9:36.59
3	Marta Serrano (ESP)	9:41.86		9:27.07
4	Tuğba Güvenç (TUR)	9:47.31	SB	9:25.58
5	Laura Taborda (POR)	9:55.56		9:50.86
6	Pauline Meyer (GER)	9:57.84		9:44.85
7	Eleonora Curtabbi (ITA)	9:59.01		9:49.74
8	Veerle Bakker (NED)	10:02.87		9:47.37
9	Sibylle Häring (SUI)	10:04.02		9:54.98
10	Soňa Kouřilová (CZE)	10:05.23		10:04.29
11	Linn Söderholm (SWE)	10:07.72		9:44.25
12	Isavella Kotsacheili (GRE)	10:08.23		9:58.21
13	Sara Aarsvoll Svarstad (NOR)	10:09.18	PB	10:16.49
14	Maisie Grice (GBR)	10:09.99		9:48.89
15	Nelli Nordlund (FIN)	10:22.34		10:17.96
16	Jolien Van Hoorebeke (BEL)	10:32.28	PB	10:36.64
WR: (Kenya) Beatrice Chepkoech 8:44.32; ER: (Russia) G Samitova-Galkina 8:58.81 EL: (France) Alice Finot 9:10.04; CR: (Russia) Yuliya Zaripova 9:23.00

=== 100 metres hurdles ===
Rank	Heat	Lane	Athlete	Result	Notes	Entry PB
1	A	3	Pia Skrzyszowska (POL)	12.77	(gold) EU23L	12.51
2	A	4	Nadine Visser (NED)	12.81	2nd place, silver medalist(s)	12.51
3	A	5	Laeticia Bapté (FRA)	12.82		12.78
4	A	6	Reetta Hurske (FIN)	13.09		12.70
5	A	8	Elisa Maria Di Lazzaro (ITA)	13.21		12.90
6	B	5	Teresa Errandonea (ESP)	13.22 (.217)		13.04
7	A	9	Elisavet Pesiridou (GRE)	13.22 (.219)		12.93
8	B	6	Tereza Elena Šínová (CZE)	13.26		13.14
9	B	7	Monika Zapalska (GER)	13.32		13.13
10	B	8	Şevval Ayaz (TUR)	13.33	SB	13.15
11	B	4	Andrea Rooth (NOR)	13.41		13.11
12	B	3	Catarina Queiros (POR)	13.43		13.39
13	A	2	Abigail Pawlett (GBR)	13.63		13.13
14	B	9	Maja Maunsbach (SWE)	13.81		13.39
15	B	2	Jolien Maliga Boumkwo (BEL)	32.81	SB	
	A	7	Ditaji Kambundji (SUI)	DQ	TR16.8	12.70
Wind: -0.2 m/s (Heat A) +1.4 m/s (Heat B)		WR: (Nigeria) Tobi Amusan - 12.12; ER: (Bulgaria) Yordanka Donkova 12.21 EL: (Czech Republic) Reetta Hurske 12.70; CR: (Belarus) Elvira Herman 12.62				

=== 400 metres hurdles women ===
Rank	Heat	Lane	Athlete	Result	Notes	Entry PB
1	A	7	Carolina Krafzik (GER)	54.47	(gold) SB	54.32
2	A	9	Ayomide Folorunso (ITA)	54.79	(silver) SB	54.34
3	A	8	Cathelijn Peeters (NED)	54.97	3rd place, bronze medalist(s)	54.65
4	A	5	Viivi Lehikoinen (FIN)	55.19		54.40
5	A	4	Lina Nielsen (GBR)	55.36		54.73
6	A	2	Nikoleta Jíchová (CZE)	55.44	PB	55.48
7	B	8	Fatoumata Binta Diallo (POR)	55.57	PB	56.72
8	B	4	Moa Granat (SWE)	56.61	EU20L	56.77
9	A	3	Dimitra Gnafaki (GRE)	56.63		56.14
10	B	7	Julia Korzuch (POL)	56.73		56.36
11	B	6	Camille Seri (FRA)	56.99		55.79
12	B	5	Carla García (ESP)	57.13		56.54
13	B	9	Andrea Rooth (NOR)	57.19	SB	56.58
14	B	3	Salome Hüsler (SUI)	57.52	PB	57.77
15	B	2	Gülşah Cebeci (TUR)	1:02.52		1:00.69
	A	6	Hanne Claes (BEL)	DNS		54.75
WR: (United States) Sydney McLaughlin 50.68; ER: (Netherlands) Femke Bol 52.03 EL: (Netherlands) Femke Bol 52.30; CR: (Bulgaria) Vanya Stambolova 53.70

=== High jump women ===
Rank	Group	Athlete	1.59	1.65	1.71	1.76	1.80	1.84	1.87	1.90	1.92	1.94	Height	Notes	Entry PB
1	A	Nawal Meniker (FRA)	-	-	-	-	o	o	xo	o	o	xxx	1.92	3rd place, bronze medalist(s)	1.93
2	A	Merel Maes (BEL)	-	-	-	o	o	xo	o	xo	xo	x	1.92	=PB	1.92
3	B	Michaela Hrubá (CZE)	-	-	o	o	o	o	o	xo	xxx		1.90	SB	1.95i
4	A	Buse Savaşkan (TUR)	-	-	-	o	o	o	o	xxx			1.87		1.88
5	B	Blessing Enatoh (GER)	-	-	xo	o	o	o	o	xxx			1.87	=PB	1.87
6	A	Tatiana Gusin (GRE)	-	-	o	-	o	xxo	xo	x			1.87		1.94i
7	A	Salome Lang (SUI)	-	-	-	o	xxo	o	xx				1.84		1.97
8	B	Anabela Neto (POR)	-	xo	o	o	xxo	o	x				1.84	SB	1.86i
9	B	Wiktoria Miąso (POL)	-	-	o	o	o	xo	xxx				1.84		1.92
10	A	Ella Junnila (FIN)	-	-	-	-	o	xxx					1.80		1.96i
11	B	Glenka Antonia (NED)	-	-	o	xo	o	xxx					1.80		1.85
12=	B	Erika Furlani (ITA)	-	-	o	o	xo	xxx					1.80		1.94
12=	B	Una Stancev (ESP)	-	o	o	o	xo	xxx					1.80		1.85
14	A	Bianca Salming (SWE)	-	-	o	o	xxo	xx					1.80		1.92
15	A	Laura Zialor (GBR)	-	-	-	o	xr						1.76		1.91i
16	B	Sigrid Kleive (NOR)	xo	-	xxo	x							1.71		1.76
WR: (Bulgaria) Stefka Kostadinova - 2.09; ER: (Bulgaria) Stefka Kostadinova 2.09 EL: (Ukraine) Yaroslava Mahuchikh 2.01; CR: (Croatia) Blanka Vlasic 2.04

=== Pole vault women ===
Rank	Group	Athlete	3.70	3.90	4.10	4.25	4.40	4.50	4.60	4.65	4.71	4.76	Height	Notes	Entry PB
1	A	Wilma Murto (FIN)	-	-	-	xo	o	xxo	o	o	o	xxx	4.71	1st place, gold medalist(s)	4.85
2	A	Angelica Moser (SUI)	-	-	-	-	o	xo	xo	xx			4.60	3rd place, bronze medalist(s)	4.75i
3	A	Amálie Švábíková (CZE)	-	-	-	o	xo	xo	xo	x			4.60		4.72i
4	B	Elien Vekemans (BEL)	-	-	o	xo	xo	o	xx				4.50	EU23L	4.47i
5	B	Jade Ive (GBR)	-	o	o	o	o	xo	xr				4.50	PB	4.43i
6	A	Lene Onsrud Retzius (NOR)	-	-	-	o	o	xxo	xx				4.50		4.70
7	B	Sarah Franziska Vogel (GER)	-	o	o	o	o	xxx					4.40		4.30
8=	A	Aikaterini Stefanidi (GRE)	-	-	-	-	xo	xxx					4.40		4.91
8=	A	Margot Chevrier (FRA)	-	-	-	-	xo	xxx					4.40		4.71
10=	A	Roberta Bruni (ITA)	-	-	-	o	xxx						4.25		4.72
10=	B	Emilia Kusy (POL)	-	o	o	o	xxx						4.25	PB	4.20
12	B	Karlijn Schouten (NED)	o	o	xo	o	xxx						4.25	PB	4.21i
13	B	Maialen Axpe (ESP)	-	o	xxo	o	xx						4.25		4.50i
14	A	Michaela Meijer (SWE)	-	-	o	x-	xx						4.10		4.83
15	B	Buse Arıkazan (TUR)	-	-	xxo	xx							4.10		4.42
16	B	Marta Onofre (POR)	-	xo	xr								3.90		4.51i
WR: (Russia) Yelena Isinbayeva 5.06; ER: (Russia) Yelena Isinbayeva 5.06 EL: (Slovenia) Tina Sutej 4.76; CR: (Poland) Anna Rogowska 4.75

=== Long jump women ===
Rank	Athlete	1	2	3	4	5	6	Result	Notes	Entry PB
1	Hilary Kpatcha (FRA)	6.75	6.67	6.53	6.64	6.71	x	6.75	2nd place, silver medalist(s)	6.86
2	Larissa Iapichino (ITA)	6.66	6.66	x	6.56	x	6.47	6.66	3rd place, bronze medalist(s)	6.97i
3	Fátima Diame (ESP)	x	6.35	x	6.40	6.56	x	6.56		6.82
4	Maryse Luzolo (GER)	6.40	6.39	6.43	6.09	6.49	6.20	6.49		6.71
5	Pauline Hondema (NED)	6.49	6.38	6.40	6.13	6.33	DNA	6.49		6.57i
6	Lucy Hadaway (GBR)	6.31	6.29	x	6.28	6.41	DNA	6.41		6.73
7	Tilde Johansson (SWE)	6.21	6.18	6.39	6.39	x	DNA	6.39		6.73
8	Jessica Kähärä (FIN)	x	6.14	6.34	6.34	x	DNA	6.34		6.47
9	Thale Leirfall (NOR)	6.17	6.16	6.00	Did not advance			6.17	PB	6.15
10	Michaela Kučerová (CZE)	6.17	6.05	x	Did not advance			6.17		6.36
11	Vasiliki Chaitidou (GRE)	6.05	5.98	6.10	Did not advance			6.10		6.49
12	Maité Beernaert (BEL)	6.00	x	6.10	Did not advance			6.10		6.26
13	Daniela Gubler (SUI)	x	6.05	6.01	Did not advance			6.05		6.64
14	Magdalena Bokun (POL)	x	6.03	6.02	Did not advance			6.03		6.71
15	Ecem Çalağan (TUR)	5.95	x	r	Did not advance			5.95		6.41
16	Catarina Queiros (POR)	x	5.53	x	Did not advance			5.53		5.95
WR: (Soviet Union) Galina Chistyakova 7.52; ER: (Soviet Union) Galina Chistyakova 7.52 EL: (United Kingdom) Jazmin Sawyers 7.00i CR: (Russia) Darya Klishina 6.95

=== Triple jump women ===
Rank	Athlete	1	2	3	4	5	6	Result	Notes	Entry PB
1	Tuğba Danışmaz (TUR)	13.90	14.16	x	x	13.93	13.90	14.16	(silver) NR	14.31i
2	Ottavia Cestonaro (ITA)	14.03	14.09	13.96	x	13.90	13.87	14.09	3rd place, bronze medalist(s)	14.22
3	Maja Åskag (SWE)	x	13.74	13.88	x	x	x	13.88		14.05
4	Kira Wittmann (GER)	13.71	x	x	x	13.21	13.31	13.71		14.08i
5	Kristiina Mäkelä (FIN)	13.38	13.48	13.64	13.68	13.60	DNA	13.68		14.64
6	Adrianna Laskowska (POL)	13.61	13.67	13.55	11.90	13.56	DNA	13.67		14.12
7	Ana Peleteiro (ESP)	13.67	13.52	x	x	13.05	DNA	13.67		14.87
8	Linda Suchá (CZE)	12.72	12.91	12.99	12.76	x	DNA	12.99		13.65
9	Rachel Ombeni (NOR)	12.97	12.74	12.95	Did not advance			12.97		13.43
10	Spyridoula Karydi (GRE)	12.81	12.88	12.92	Did not advance			12.92		14.19
11	Ilionis Guillaume (FRA)	12.79	x	12.92	Did not advance			12.92		14.07i
12	Evelise Veiga (POR)	x	12.01	12.80	Did not advance			12.80	SB	14.32
13	Maureen Herremans (NED)	12.73	x	12.75	Did not advance			12.75		13.21i
14	Saliyya Guisse (BEL)	x	12.69	11.28	Did not advance			12.69		13.38
15	Georgina Forde-Wells (GBR)	x	12.57	x	Did not advance			12.57		12.96
16	Barbara Leuthard (SUI)	x	11.98	12.22	Did not advance			12.22		13.40
WR: (Venezuela) Yulimar Rojas 15.74; ER: (Ukraine) Inessa Kravets 15.50 EL: (Ukraine) Maryna Bekh-Romanchuk 14.75; CR: (Russia) Yekaterina Koneva 14.87

=== Shot put women ===
Rank	Athlete	1	2	3	4	5	6	Result	Notes	Entry PB
1	Auriol Dongmo (POR)	18.42	18.45	x	19.07	18.38	x	19.07	1st place, gold medalist(s)	20.43i
2	Yemisi Ogunleye (GER)	17.91	18.59	18.85	18.59	x	x	18.85	2nd place, silver medalist(s)	19.31
3	Axelina Johansson (SWE)	18.03	18.29	18.29	x	x	18.32	18.32	3rd place, bronze medalist(s)	19.54
4	Jessica Schilder (NED)	18.14	x	x	18.27	17.45	x	18.27		20.24
5	Klaudia Kardasz (POL)	16.94	16.83	x	x	17.12	DNA	17.12		18.63i
6	Eveliina Rouvali (FIN)	17.08	17.06	x	x	16.43	DNA	17.08		17.53
7	Jolien Maliga Boumkwo (BEL)	16.07	15.99	16.58	x	x	DNA	16.58		17.87i
8	Miryam Mazenauer (SUI)	x	15.12	16.15	x	15.33	DNA	16.15		16.51
9	Katrin Brzyszkowská (CZE)	16.13	15.69	16.00	Did not advance			16.13		16.79
10	Sinem Yıldırım (TUR)	15.76	15.01	15.31	Did not advance			15.76		15.84
11	Monia Cantarella (ITA)	15.66	x	15.56	Did not advance			15.66		16.61
12	María Belén Toimil (ESP)	x	x	15.32	Did not advance			15.32		18.80
13	Naomie Wuta (FRA)	14.90	14.65	15.29	Did not advance			15.29		15.40i
14	Maria Magkoulia (GRE)	15.13	14.42	14.31	Did not advance			15.13		15.93
15	Sarah Omoregie (GBR)	x	x	14.43	Did not advance			14.43		17.67
16	Mariell Morken (NOR)	x	13.09	13.39	Did not advance			13.39		13.87
WR: (Soviet Union) Natalya Lisovskaya 22.63; ER: (Soviet Union) Natalya Lisovskaya 22.63 EL: (Portugal) Auriol Dongmo 19.72; CR: (Germany) Christina Schwanitz 19.82

=== Discus throw women ===
Rank	Athlete	1	2	3	4	5	6	Result	Notes	Entry PB
1	Kristin Pudenz (GER)	64.01	63.37	64.19	x	66.84	x	66.84	(gold) SB	67.87
2	Daisy Osakue (ITA)	60.22	x	x	61.37	x	64.35	64.35	2nd place, silver medalist(s)	64.57
3	Melina Robert-Michon (FRA)	61.10	x	58.41	63.78	61.62	64.21	64.21	3rd place, bronze medalist(s)	66.73
4	Liliana Cá (POR)	60.36	61.41	60.35	61.53	63.21	x	63.21		66.40
5	Caisa-Marie Lindfors (SWE)	54.79	57.72	58.16	x	x	DNA	58.16		60.80
6	Jade Lally (GBR)	55.83	58.08	x	x	41.67	DNA	58.08		65.10
7	Lotta Flatum (NOR)	x	x	55.90	52.21	x	DNA	55.90		59.11
8	Salla Sipponen (FIN)	52.67	50.69	52.42	x	52.88	DNA	52.88		60.58
9	Corinne Nugter (NED)	x	51.97	52.39	Did not advance			52.39		60.02
10	Daria Zabawska (POL)	x	x	52.11	Did not advance			52.11		62.96
11	Nurten Mermer (TUR)	50.89	50.40	x	Did not advance			50.89		55.73
12	Barbora Tichá (CZE)	48.90	50.03	50.68	Did not advance			50.68		56.07
13	June Kintana (ESP)	47.40	49.73	50.64	Did not advance			50.64		57.83
14	Katelijne Lyssens (BEL)	45.49	46.33	48.04	Did not advance			48.04		53.72
15	Despoina Areti Filippidou (GRE)	45.77	x	x	Did not advance			45.77		55.12
16	Chiara Baumann (SUI)	41.35	43.55	43.64	Did not advance			43.64		49.02
WR: (East Germany) Gabriele Reinsch 76.80; ER: (East Germany) Gabriele Reinsch 76.80 EL: (Netherlands) Jorinde van Klinken 67.05; CR: (Croatia) Sandra Perkovic 68.58

=== Hammer throw women ===
Rank	Athlete	1	2	3	4	5	6	Result	Notes	Entry PB
1	Sara Fantini (ITA)	73.02	72.31	x	x	70.63	73.26	73.26	(gold) =SB	75.77
2	Silja Kosonen (FIN)	69.19	69.50	69.45	71.75	68.93	72.34	72.34	3rd place, bronze medalist(s)	73.50
3	Malwina Kopron (POL)	67.74	70.77	70.85	x	x	71.18	71.18		76.85
4	Charlotte Payne (GBR)	66.28	x	65.10	69.81	71.14	x	71.14		70.59
5	Grete Ahlberg (SWE)	64.64	68.46	x	69.49	x	DNA	69.49	SB	70.87
6	Samantha Borutta (GER)	66.42	68.92	67.76	68.97	67.24	DNA	68.97		72.14
7	Vanessa Sterckendries (BEL)	67.95	x	x	65.69	65.16	DNA	67.95		69.91
8	Laura Redondo (ESP)	66.71	64.59	x	67.05	65.74	DNA	67.05		72.00
9	Beatrice Nedberge Llano (NOR)	64.86	64.58	65.92	Did not advance			65.92		72.10
10	Rose Loga (FRA)	65.62	x	65.71	Did not advance			65.71		71.09
11	Stamatia Scarvelis (GRE)	65.07	x	x	Did not advance			65.07		71.43
12	Tuğçe Şahutoğlu (TUR)	61.92	61.54	61.67	Did not advance			61.92		74.17
13	Mariana Pestana (POR)	55.67	61.14	x	Did not advance			61.14		68.50
14	Audrey Jacobs (NED)	57.48	58.54	59.48	Did not advance			59.48		64.57
15	Adéla Korečková (CZE)	x	x	58.37	Did not advance			58.37		65.83
16	Lydia Wehrli (SUI)	58.17	54.12	57.69	Did not advance			58.17		60.32
WR: (Poland) Anita Wlodarczyk 82.98; ER: (Poland) Anita Wlodarczyk 82.98 EL: (Finland) Silja Kosonen 73.78; CR: (Poland) Anita Wlodarczyk 78.28

=== Javelin throw women ===
Rank	Athlete	1	2	3	4	5	6	Result	Notes	Entry PB
1	Nikola Ogrodníková (CZE)	49.11	60.55	53.82	61.75	x	59.00	61.75	(silver) SB	67.40
2	Christin Hussong (GER)	59.98	59.45	60.05	x	58.15	x	60.05	SB	69.19
3	Bekah Walton (GBR)	x	49.02	59.76	54.38	49.37	-	59.76	PB	57.65
4	Anni-Linnea Alanen (FIN)	47.87	54.15	59.69	54.66	57.35	57.42	59.69	PB	59.52
5	Elina Tzengko (GRE)	51.01	58.19	x	59.40	58.25	DNA	59.40		65.81
6	Claudia Ferreira (POR)	55.49	51.29	53.74	55.82	51.52	DNA	55.82	PB	54.81
7	Esra Türkmen (TUR)	52.73	52.37	55.32	52.96	53.12	DNA	55.32		57.46
8	Marcelina Witek-Konofał (POL)	52.10	55.19	x	x	x	DNA	55.19		66.53
9	Sigrid Borge (NOR)	54.81	x	x	Did not advance			54.81		66.50
10	Alizée Minard (FRA)	54.40	x	50.85	Did not advance			54.40		57.91
11	Lisanne Schol (NED)	51.59	49.93	51.10	Did not advance			51.59		60.92
12	Arantza Moreno (ESP)	51.02	x	48.45	Did not advance			51.02		59.69
13	Beatrice Lantz (SWE)	50.22	x	x	Did not advance			50.22		55.07
14	Federica Botter (ITA)	x	47.39	49.12	Did not advance			49.12		57.81
15	Pauline Smal (BEL)	47.24	x	42.82	Did not advance			47.24		52.63
16	Sabrina Boss (SUI)	43.71	46.54	44.39	Did not advance			46.54		52.35
WR: (Czech Republic) Barbora Spotakova 72.28; ER: (Czech Republic) Barbora Spotakova 72.28 EL: (Norway) Sigrid Borge 66.50; CR: (Germany) Christin Hussong 69.19

=== 4 x 100 metres relay women ===
Unlike most of the sprint and 800 metre events which are seeded by entry time or mark, the relays are seeded on the day to ensure the best teams in the overall standings compete against one another.

Rank	Heat	Lane	Team	Athletes	Result	Notes	Entry NR
1	A	7	Netherlands	N'Ketia Seedo, Lieke Klaver, Jamile Samuel, Tasa Jiya	42.61	(gold) EL	42.04
2	A	5	Poland	Marika Popowicz-Drapała, Monika Romaszko, Magdalena Stefanowicz, Ewa Swoboda	42.97	(silver) SB	42.61
3	A	4	Spain	Carmen Marco, Paula García, Paula Sevilla, Jaël Bestué	43.13	(bronze) SB	42.58
4	A	8	Germany	Lisa Nippgen, Lisa Mayer, Louise Wieland, Jennifer Montag	43.24	SB	41.37
5	B	6	Switzerland	Lena Weiss, Salomé Kora, Géraldine Frey, Céline Bürgi	43.39	SB	42.05
6	B	8	France	Carolle Zahi, Marie-Ange Rimlinger, Gémima Joseph, Mallory Leconte	43.62	SB	41.78
7	B	7	Greece	Artemis Melina Anastasiou, Elisavet Pesiridou, Dimitra Tsoukala, Polyniki Emmanouilidou	43.81	SB	43.07
8	B	5	Belgium	Elise Mehuys, Janie De Naeyer, Rani Vincke, Imke Vervaet	43.84	SB	42.54
9	A	3	Portugal	Lorène Dorcas Bazolo, Arialis Gandulla, Rosalina Santos, Íris Silva	44.27	NR	44.43
10	B	9	Czech Republic	Karolína Maňasová, Natálie Kožuškaničová, Barbora Šplechtnová, Nikola Bendová	44.29	SB	42.98
11	B	3	Turkey	Sila Koloğlu, Şevval Ayaz, Simay Özçiftçi, Elif Polat	44.74	SB	44.49
12	A	9	Italy	Johanelis Herrera Abreu, Dalia Kaddari, Anna Bongiorni, Vittoria Fontana	52.28	SB	42.71
	A	6	Great Britain	Cassie-Ann Pemberton, Amy Hunt, Alyson Bell, Aleeya Sibbons	DQ	TR24.7	41.55
	B	4	Norway	Henriette Jæger, Christine Bjelland Jensen, Vilde Aasmo, Helene Rønningen	DQ	TR24.7	43.94
	B	2	Sweden	Elvira Tanderud, Nora Lindahl, Julia Henriksson, Filippa Sivnert	DQ	TR24.7	43.61
	A	2	Finland	Anna Pursiainen, Aino Pulkkinen, Anniina Kortetmaa, Lotta Kemppinen	DQ	TR24.7	43.37
WR: United States 40.82; ER: East Germany 41.37 EL: Spain 42.99; CR: Germany 42.47

== Mixed event ==
=== 4 x 400 metres relay mixed ===
Rank	Heat	Lane	Team	Athletes	Result	Notes	Entry NR
1	B	6	Czech Republic	Matéj Krsek, Tereza Petržilková, Vít Müller, Lada Vondrová	3:12.34	(gold) CR	3:14.84
2	A	6	Poland	Maks Szwed, Anna Kiełbasińska, Igor Bogaczyński, Natalia Kaczmarek	3:12.87	(silver) SB	3:09.87
3	B	5	Belgium	Jonathan Sacoor, Camille Laus, Dylan Borlée, Cynthia Bolingo	3:12.97	(bronze) SB	3:11.51
4	A	3	France	Gilles Biron, Fanny Peltier, Téo Andant, Amandine Brossier	3:13.36	NR	3:17.17
5	A	9	Italy	Edoardo Scotti, Ayomide Folorunso, Alessandro Sibilio, Anna Polinari	3:13.56	SB	3:13.51
6	A	7	Germany	Manuel Sanders, Elisa Lechleitner, Jean Paul Bredau, Carolina Krafzik	3:14.00	SB	3:12.94
7	A	2	Portugal	João Coelho, Cátia Azevedo, Ricardo dos Santos, Fatoumata Binta Diallo	3:14.06	SB	
8	B	7	Switzerland	Lionel Spitz, Giulia Senn, Ricky Petrucciani, Julia Niederberger	3:14.22	NR	3:19.68
9	A	5	Great Britain	Alex Haydock-Wilson, Ama Pipi, Brodie Young, Carys McAulay	3:14.27	SB	3:11.95
10	B	8	Norway	Andreas Grimerud, Henriette Jæger, Håvard Bentdal Ingvaldsen, Josefine Tomine Eriksen	3:15.67	SB	
11	A	4	Spain	Iñaki Cañal, Carmen Avilés, Óscar Husillos, Laura Bueno	3:16.79	SB	3:13.29
12	B	2	Sweden	Kasper Kadestål, Lisa Lilja, Emil Johansson, Moa Granat	3:17.93	SB	
13	B	8	Turkey	Ilyas Çanakçı, Edanur Tulum, Oğuzhan Kaya, Elif Polat	3:20.01	SB	
14	A	8	Netherlands	Isayah Boers, Zoë Sedney, Terrence Agard, Eveline Saalberg	3:20.40	SB	3:09.90
15	B	3	Greece	Spiridon Ilias Doukatelis, Dimitra Gnafaki, Georgios Lampropoulos, Eirini Vasileiou	3:23.10	SB	
16	B	4	Finland	Viljami Kaasalainen, Viivi Lehikoinen, Asseri Välimäki, Mette Baas	3:27.31	SB	
WR: United States 3:09.34; ER: Poland 3:09.87 EL: Belgium 3:26.24; CR: no record
