= 2025 Balkan Athletics Indoor Championships =

- Dates: 15 February
- Host city: Belgrade, Serbia
- Venue: Atletska dvorana
- Level: Senior
- Events: 24

The 2025 Balkan Athletics Indoor Championships was the 29th edition of the annual indoor track and field competition for athletes from the Balkans, organised by Balkan Athletics. It was held on 15 February at the Atletska dvorana in Belgrade, Serbia.

== Medal summary ==
=== Men ===
Event	Gold		Silver		Bronze	
60 metres	Ertan Özkan; Turkey	6.63	Mustafa Kemal Ay; Turkey	6.65	Nikola Karamanolov; Bulgaria	6.69
400 metres	Oleksandr Pohorilko; Ukraine	46.49	Boško Kijanović; Serbia	46.71	Berke Akçam; Turkey	47.14
800 metres	Ömer Faruk Bozdağ; Turkey	1:48.42	Nino Jambrešić; Croatia	1:48.73	Andrej Belčić; Croatia	1:48.88
1500 metres	Yervand Mkrtchyan; Armenia	3:49.82	Anže Svit Požgaj; Slovenia	3:51.69	İbrahim Erata; Turkey	3:51.99
3000 metres	Salih Teksöz; Turkey	8:10.62	Vid Botolin; Slovenia	8:11.77	Ayetullah Aslanhan; Turkey	8:21.71
60 metres hurdles	Mikdat Sevler; Turkey	7.68	Alin Ionuţ Anton; Romania	7.78	Ayetullah Demir; Turkey	7.94
4 × 400 metres relay	Turkey; Eren Keser; Ilyas Çanakçı; Berke Akçam; İsmail Nezir	3:10.97	Slovenia; Maj Janža; Jan Vukovič; Lovro Mesec Košir; Rok Ferlan	3:11.38	Romania; Cristian Gabriel Voicu; Constantin Deaconescu; Andrei Enache; Mario Alexandru Dobrescu	3:27.18
High jump	Vadim Kravchuk; Ukraine	2.19 m	Tihomir Ivanov; Bulgaria	2.19 m	Antonios Merlos; Greece	2.16 m
Pole vault	Ilia Bobrovnik; Ukraine	5.30 m	Erdem Tilki; Turkey	5.20 m	Luka Zupanc; Slovenia	5.20 m
Long jump	Bozhidar Sarâboyukov; Bulgaria	8.12 m CR	Danylo Dubyna; Ukraine	7.92m	Andreas Trajkovski; North Macedonia	7.63 m
Triple jump	Rustam Mammadov; Azerbaijan	16.30 m	Gor Hovakimyan; Armenia	16.10 m	Can Özüpek; Turkey	16.09 m
Shot put	Andrei Toader; Romania	20.89 m CR	Armin Sinančević; Serbia	20.42 m	Mesud Pezer; Bosnia and Herzegovina	19.79 m

=== Women ===
Event	Gold		Silver		Bronze	
60 metres	Maria Mihalache; Romania	7.31	Lucija Potnik; Slovenia	7.32	Dimitra Tsoukala; Greece	7.33
400 metres	Veronika Drljačić; Croatia	53.85	Andrea Savova; Bulgaria	54.14	Karolina Zbičajnik; Slovenia	54.45
800 metres	Caroline Bredlinger; Austria	2:02.16	Nina Vuković; Croatia	2:02.44	Georgia-Maria Despollari; Greece	2:03.38
1500 metres	Tuğba Toptaş; Turkey	4:23.96	Klara Andrijašević; Croatia	4:15.84	Emmanouela Plaka; Greece	4:26.83
3000 metres	Stella Jepkosgei Rutto; Romania	8:59.45	Bahar Yıldırım; Turkey	9:00.84	Derya Kunur; Turkey	9:07.34
60 metres hurdles	Mia Wild; Croatia	8.06	Marija Bukvić; Serbia	8.18	Nika Glojnarič; Slovenia	8.21
4 × 400 metres relay	Slovenia; Ajda Kaučič; Petja Klojčnik; Maja Pogorevc; Karolina Zbičajnik	3:39.14	Croatia; Natalija Švenda; Klara Andrijašević; Nina Vuković; Veronika Drljačić	3:40.78	Turkey; Sıla Koloğlu; Elif Polat; Elif Ilgaz; Edanur Tulum	3:40.99
High jump	Marija Vuković; Montenegro	1.80 m	Tatiana Gousin; Greece	1.80 m	Natali Kostova; Bulgaria	1.77 m
Pole vault	Yana Hladiychuk; Ukraine	4.30 m	Buse Arıkazan-Çağlayan; Turkey	3.95 m	Not awarded	
Long jump	Milica Gardašević; Serbia	6.47 m	Filippa Fotopoulou; Cyprus	6.42 m	Diana Myroshnichenko; Ukraine	6.34 m
Triple jump	Aleksandrija Mitrović; Serbia	13.59 m	Elena Andreea Taloș; Romania	13.58 m	Kadriye Dilek Durmuş; Turkey	13.42 m
Shot put	Dimitriana Bezede; Moldova	17.09 m	Olha Holodna; Ukraine	16.46 m	Maria Maggoulia; Greece	15.22 m

== Medal table ==
The host country is highlighted in lavender blue

Rank	Nation	Gold	Silver	Bronze	Total
1	Turkey*	6	4	8	18
2	Ukraine	4	2	1	7
3	Romania	3	2	1	6
4	Croatia	2	4	1	7
5	Serbia	2	3	0	5
6	Slovenia	1	4	3	8
7	Bulgaria	1	2	2	5
8	Armenia	1	1	0	2
9	Austria	1	0	0	1
9	Azerbaijan	1	0	0	1
9	Moldova	1	0	0	1
9	Montenegro	1	0	0	1
13	Greece	0	1	5	6
14	Cyprus	0	1	0	1
15	Bosnia and Herzegovina	0	0	1	1
15	North Macedonia	0	0	1	1
Totals (16 entries)		24	24	23	71
