= Simay Özçiftçi =

Turkish sprinter (born 2003)

- Simay Özçiftçi at the 2021 Islamic Solidarity Games (2022)

Personal information
- Nationality: Turkey
- Born: 24 March 2003 (age 23) Karşıyaka, İzmir, Turkey

Sport
- Sport: Sprinter
- Club: Galatasaray Athletics
Medal record
Women's athletics
Representing Turkey
Mediterranean Games}
Bronze medal – third place	2026 Taranto	4 × 100 m relay NR
Bronze medal – third place	2026 Taranto	4 × 400 m relay
Gold medal – first place	2026 Taranto	Mixed 4 x 400 m 'GR
Islamic Solidarity Games
Bronze medal – third place	2025 Riyadh	Mixed 4 x 400 m
Bronze medal – third place	2021 Konya	4 x 100 m
Balkan Championships
Silver medal – second place	2026 Volos	100 m
Silver medal – second place	2026 Volos	4 x 100 m
Balkan Indoor Championships
Bronze medal – third place	2024 Istanbul	60 m
Balkan Indoor U20 Championships
Bronze medal – third place	2022 Belgrade	60 m
Silver medal – second place	2022 Belgrade	4 x 400 m NR

Simay Özçiftçi (born 24 March 2003) is a Turkish Sprinter, who specializes in the 100 m and 200 m events. She occasionally competes in the 400 m event She is holder of several national records.

== Sport career ==
=== Early years ===
Özçiftçi started performing rhytmic gymnastics at the age of four supported by her parents, and achieved numerous top rankings. Because she could not overcome her fear of injury on the balance beam, she stepped away from gymnastics, and wanted to quit sport. Upon the advice of her school teachers, she took up athletics at the age of nine. Using the foundation she gained in gymnastics, she secured first-place finishes in numerous 100-m and 200-m races, became Turkey's fastest athlete for two consecutive years, and was dubbed the "flying girl". At the 2015 Turkish Indoor U16 Championships in Istanbul, she became champion in the 60 m with 8.16 and in the 300 m with 43.8. As Turkish cjampion, she was selected to the national team. She competed in 2015 in Sweden, in 2016 in the Netherlands. and in 2017, at the age of fourteen, competed in the relay event at the International Sprint and Relay Festival in Erzurum, Turkey in the cadets category against athletes three years her senior, despite not then meeting the standard age requirement.

During the Indoor Athletics Trial Races in Istanbul on 23 January2020, she set a new national U20 and seniors record in the indoor 300 m event with 39.36. The former record was in 40.94 by Yaren Açar.

Özçiftçi was a member of Enkaspor, before she transferred to Galatasaray Athletics.

=== 2021 ===
She competed in the 100 m and 200 m events at the 2021 World Athletics U20 Championships in Nairobi, Kenya without success. At the 2021 Summer World University Games in Chengdu, China, she failed to win a medal in the 100 m, 200 m and 4 × 100 m relay events. She won the bronze medal with Şevval Ayaz, Cansu Nimet Sayın, Elif Polat in the 4 × 100 m relay event at the 2021 Islamic Solidarity Games in Konya, which was postponed to 2022 due to COVID-19 pandemic in Turkey.

=== 2022 ===
At the 2022 Balkan Indoor U20 Championships in Belgrade, Serbia, she won the bronze medal in the 60 m, and the silver medal in the 4 × 400 m relay event. The team also set a new national record in 3:48.82.

=== 2023 ===
She competed in the 60 m event at the 2023 Mediterranean U23 Indoor Championships in Valencia, Spain. At the 2023 Europea Team Championships First Division in Chorzów, Poland, she rset her personal best with 23.77 in the 200 m, and season's best with 44.49 in the 4 × 100 m relay event with teammates Sila Koloğlu, Şevval Ayaz, Elif Polat, but failed to receive any medal. She was not successful in the 100 m, 200 m and 4 × 100 m relay events at the 2023 European U23 Championships in Espoo, Finland.

=== 2024 ===
She won the bronze medal in the 60 m event at the 2024 Balkan Indoor Championships in Istanbul, Turkey.

=== 2025 ===
AT the 2025 Turkish Seniors Indoor Athletics Championships, she won the gold medal in the 200 m event, and improved the former record of Sıla Koloğlu to 23.67. She missed the final in the 200 m and 4 × 100 m relay events at the 2025 European U23 Championships in Bergen, Norway. She competed in the 200 m event at the 2025 Summer World University Games in Bochum, Germany. At the 2025 Islamic Solidarity Games in Riyadh, Saudi Arabia, she was part of the national mixed 4 × 400 m relay team with Ismail Nezir, Sıla Koloğlui, Berke Akçam, which won the bronze medal.

=== 2026 ===
She won silver medal in the 100 m, and 4 × 100 m event with Büşra Akay, Bahar Öztürk, Beyzanur Seylan at the 2026 Balkan Championships in Volos, Greece. She took the gold medal in the 100 m and the silver medal in the 200 m event at the 2026 Turkish University Athletşcs Championships in İzmir, and set a new national Inter-University record in the 100 m with 11.53 in İzmir, Turkey on 9 May 2026. She took part in the 100 m event at the 2026 European Championships in Birmingham, United Kingdom without success. She competed at the 2026 Mediterranean Games in Taranto, Italy. She won the bronze medal in the women's 4 × 100 m relay with Büşra Akay, Sıla Koloğlu, Elif Polat, and in the women's 4 × 400 m relay with Sıla Koloğlu, Şilan Ayyıldız, Elif Polat, as well as the gold medal in the mixed 4 × 400 m relay event with Kubilay Ençü, Sıla Koloğlu, İsmail Nezir. On 30 August 2026, the women's 4 × 100 m relay team broke the former national record of 44.38 with 44.05. The mixed 4 × 400 m relay team set a new Games record with 3:14.85 on 2 September 2026.

== Personal life ==
Born on 24 March 2003, Simay Özçiftçi is a native of Karşıyaka in İzmir, wetern Turkey.

She is a student at Istanbul Kent University.
