= 2022 Balkan Athletics Indoor Championships =

- Dates: 5 March
- Host city: Istanbul, Turkey
- Venue: Ataköy Athletics Arena
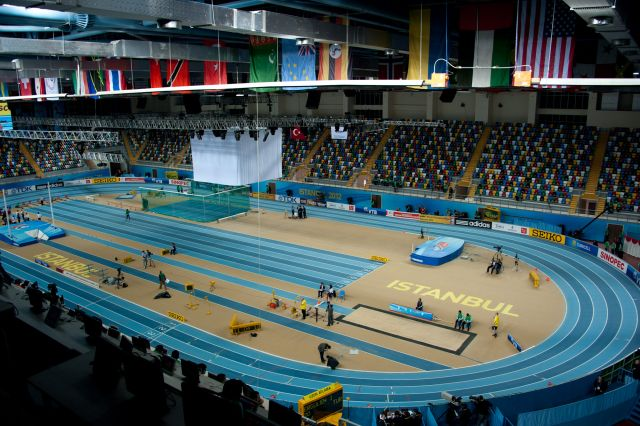
- Level: Senior
- Events: 24

The 2022 Balkan Athletics Indoor Championships was the 27th edition of the annual indoor track and field competition for athletes from the Balkans, organised by Balkan Athletics. It was held on 5 March at the Ataköy Athletics Arena in Istanbul, Turkey.

== Medal summary ==
=== Men ===
Event	Gold		Silver		Bronze	
60m	Kayhan Özer; Turkey	6.64	Aleksa Kijanović; Serbia	6.66	Markus Fuchs; Austria	6.68
60mH	Alin Anton; Romania	7.77	Mikdat Sevler; Turkey	7.78	Luka Trgovčević; Serbia	7.87
400m	İlyas Çanakçı; Turkey	46.58	İsmail Nezir; Turkey	46.76	Mihai Dringo; Romania	46.79
800m	Abedin Mujezinović; Bosnia and Herzegovina	1:50.88	Salih Teksöz; Turkey	1:51.01	Christos Kotitsas; Greece	1:51.75
1500m	Mehmet Çelik; Turkey	3:45.65	Yervand Mkrtchyan; Armenia	3:46.05	Nicolae Coman; Romania	3:47.16
3000m	Vid Botolin; Slovenia	7:57.98	Dario Ivanovski; North Macedonia	7:58.48	Murat Emektar; Turkey	8:00.18
4 × 400 m	Romania; Romania; Remus Andrei Niculita; Mihai Dringo; Denis Simon Toma; Robert Parge	3:10.36	Slovenia; Slovenia; Gregor Grahovac; Rok Ferlan; Lovro Mesec Košir; Luka Janežič	3:10.47	Turkey; Turkey; Oğuzhan Kaya; Muhammet Avcioğlu; İsmail Nezir; İlyas Çanakçı	3:10.76
High Jump	Božidar Marković; Serbia	2.15 m	Antonios Merlos; Greece	2.15 m	Andreas Steinmetz; Austria	2.10 m
Long Jump	Izmir Smajlaj; Albania	7.79 m	Marko Čeko; Croatia	7.71 m	Andreas Trajkovski; North Macedonia	7.62 m
Pole Vault	Riccardo Klotz; Austria	5.50 m	Ioannis Rizos; Greece	5.45 m	Robert Renner; Slovenia	5.45 m
Shot Put	Giorgi Mujaridze; Georgia	20.22 m	Veljko Nedeljković; Serbia	18.71 m	Marius Constantin Musteață; Romania	18.09 m
Triple Jump	Levon Aghasyan; Armenia	16.26 m	Nikolaos Andrikopoulos; Greece	16.16 m	Batuhan Çakır; Turkey	16.16 m

=== Women ===
Event	Gold		Silver		Bronze	
60m	Olivia Fotopoulou; Cyprus	7.35	Milana Tirnanić; Serbia	7.37	Marina Andreea Baboi; Romania	7.44
60mH	Anamaria Nesteriuc; Romania	8.07	Natalia Christofi; Cyprus	8.10	Ivana Lončarek; Croatia	8.20
400m	Anita Horvat; Slovenia	52.98	Susanne Gogl-Walli; Austria	53.59	Mirela Lavric; Romania	54.62
800m	Tuğba Toptaş; Turkey	2:05.51	Cristina Bălan; Romania	2:05.77	Caroline Bredlinger; Austria	2:07.76
1500m	Şilan Ayyıldız; Turkey	4:12.78	Luiza Gega; Albania	4:13.25	Lenuta Simiuc; Romania	4:16.09
3000m	Luiza Gega; Albania	9:15.11	Emine Hatun Tuna; Turkey	9:15.33	Ancuța Bobocel; Romania	9:17.89
4 × 400 m	Slovenia; Slovenia; Agata Zupin; Jerneja Smonkar; Veronika Sadek; Anita Horvat	3:37.84	Romania; Romania; Sanda Belgyan; Cristina Balan; Larisa Paraschiva Talpis; Mirela Lavric	3:45.11	Turkey; Turkey; Ecem Ece; Pinar Gülseren; Edanur Tulum; Nevin İnce	3:46.99
High Jump	Mirela Demireva; Bulgaria	1.92 m	Marija Vuković; Montenegro	1.90 m	Daniela Stanciu; Romania	1.90 m
Long Jump	Vasiliki Chaitidou; Greece	6.25 m	Klara Barnjak; Croatia	6.22 m	Milena Mitkowa; Bulgaria	6.12 m
Pole Vault	Eleni-Klaoudia Polak; Greece	4.35 m	Buse Arıkazan; Turkey	4.30 m	Demet Parlak; Turkey	4.20 m
Shot Put	Pınar Akyol; Turkey	17.44 m	Dimitriana Bezede; Moldova	17.27 m	Aysel Yılmaz; Turkey	16.06 m
Triple Jump	Tuğba Danışmaz; Turkey	14.14 m	Neja Filipič; Slovenia	13.76 m	Spyridoula Karydi; Greece	13.50 m

== Medal table ==
The host country is highlighted in lavender blue

Rank	Nation	Gold	Silver	Bronze	Total
1	Turkey*	7	5	6	18
2	Romania	3	2	8	13
3	Slovenia	3	2	1	6
4	Greece	2	3	2	7
5	Albania	2	1	0	3
6	Serbia	1	3	1	5
7	Austria	1	1	3	5
8	Armenia	1	1	0	2
8	Cyprus	1	1	0	2
10	Bulgaria	1	0	1	2
11	Bosnia and Herzegovina	1	0	0	1
11	Georgia	1	0	0	1
13	Croatia	0	2	1	3
14	North Macedonia	0	1	1	2
15	Moldova	0	1	0	1
15	Montenegro	0	1	0	1
Totals (16 entries)		24	24	24	72
