= Sıla Koloğlu =

Turkish sprinter (born 2004)

- Sıla Koloğlu at the 2025 Summer World University Games

Personal information
- Nationality: Turkey
- Born: 20 August 2004 (age 22) Bulancak, Giresun, Turkey

Sport
- Sport: Sprinter
- Club: Galatasaray Athletics
Medal record
Women's athletics
Representing Turkey
Mediterranean Games
Bronze medal – third place	2026 Taranto	200 m
Bronze medal – third place	2026 Taranto	4 × 100 m relay NR
Bronze medal – third place	2026 Taranto	4 × 400 m relay
Gold medal – first place	2026 Taranto	Mixed 4 x 400 m 'GR'
Islamic Solidarity Games
Bronze medal – third place	2025 Riyadh	Mixed 4 x 400 m
Balkan Championships
Bronze medal – third place	2026 Volos	200m
Balkan Championships
Bronze medal – third place	2026 Volos	200m
Silver medal – second place	2024 İzmir	400 m
Balkan Indoor Championships
Bronze medal – third place	2025 Belgrade	4 x 400 m relay
Bronze medal – third place	2024 Istanbul	400 m
Gold medal – first place	2024 Istanbul	4 x 400 m relay
Mediterranean U23 Championships
Silver medal – second place	2024 Ismailia	200 m
Gold medal – first place	2024 Ismailia	400 m

Sıla Koloğlu (born 20 August 2004) is a Turkish female sprinter, who specializes in the 200 m and 400 m events. She occasionally competes in the 4 x 100 m relay event. Koloğlu is holder of national records.

== Sport career ==
Koloğlu is was a member of Enkaspor in Istanbul, before she transferred to Galatasaray Athletics.

== 2022 ==
On 25 December 2022, she set a new national record for women's U20 in the indoor 200 m event in Osmangazi, Bursa with 24.04.

== 2023 ==
She was part of the women's 4 x 100 m relay team at the 2023 European Team Championships in Chorzów, Poland, which finished on the eleventh place with a seasons's best of 44.74.

== 2024 ==
On 28 January 2024, she set a new women's U23 national record in the indoor 200 m event with 23.78 at the Indoor Olympic Trial Races in Istanbul, Turkey. At the 2024 Balkan Indoor Championships in Istanbul, she took the bronze medal in the 400 m, and captured the gold medal in the 4 x 400 m relay event with Elif Polat, Büşra Yıldırım, Edanur Tulum. She won the silver medal in the 200 m and the gold medal in the 400 m event at the 2024 Mediterranean U23 Championships in Ismailia, Egypt. The same year, she took the silver medal in the 400 m at the 77th Balkan Championships in İzmir, Turkey.

== 2025 ==
She won the bronze medal in the 4 x 400 m relay event with Elif Polat, Elif Ilgaz, Edanur Tulum at the 2025 Balkan Indoor Championships in Belgrade, Serbia. She competed in the 200 m and 4 x 100 m relay events at the 2025 European U23 Championships in Bergen, Norway without success. She competed in the 200 m event at the 2025 Summer World University Games in Bochum, Germany. She was part of the national team at the 2025 Islamic Solidarity Games in Riyadh, Saudi Arabia, where she took the fourth place in the 4 x 100 m event, and was disqualified in the 400 m event. The mixed 4 x 400 m relay team, she was part of with Ismail Nezir, Simay Özçiftçi, Berke Akçam won the bronze medal.

== 2026 ==
At the 2026 European Championships in Birmingham, United kingdom, she competed in the 200 m event, and failed to advance to the finals, finished so on the 19th place. On 7 June 2026, she improved her own women's U23 national record in the 200 m event from 23.25 to 23.10 at the Olympic Trial Races in İzmir. At the 2026 Balkan Championships in Volos, Greece, she became bronze medalist in the 200 m event. She improved her own women's U23 national record in the 200 m event from 23.10 to 23.09 at the Club Super League Final Competitions in İzmir, Turkey on 26 July 2026. She competed at the 2026 Mediterranean Games in Taranto, Italy. She won the bronze medal in the 200 m, the women's 4 × 100 m relay with Büşra Akay, Simay Özçiftçi, Elif Polat, and in the women's 4 × 400 m relay with Simay Özçiftçi, Şilan Ayyıldız, Elif Polat, as well as the gold medal in the mixed 4 × 400 m relay event with Kubilay Ençü, Simay Özçiftçi, İsmail Nezir. On 30 August 2026, the women's 4 x 100 m relay team broke the former national record of 44.38 with 44.05. The mixed 4 x 400 m relay team set a new Games record with 3:14.85 on 2 September 2026.

== Personal life ==
Born on 20 August 2004, Sıla Koloğlu is a native of Bulancak of Giresun Province, northeastern Turkey.

In 2022, she entered stanbul University-Cerrahpaşa Faculty of Sports Science to study Coaching Education.
