= Nina Vuković =

Croatian athlete (born 2002)

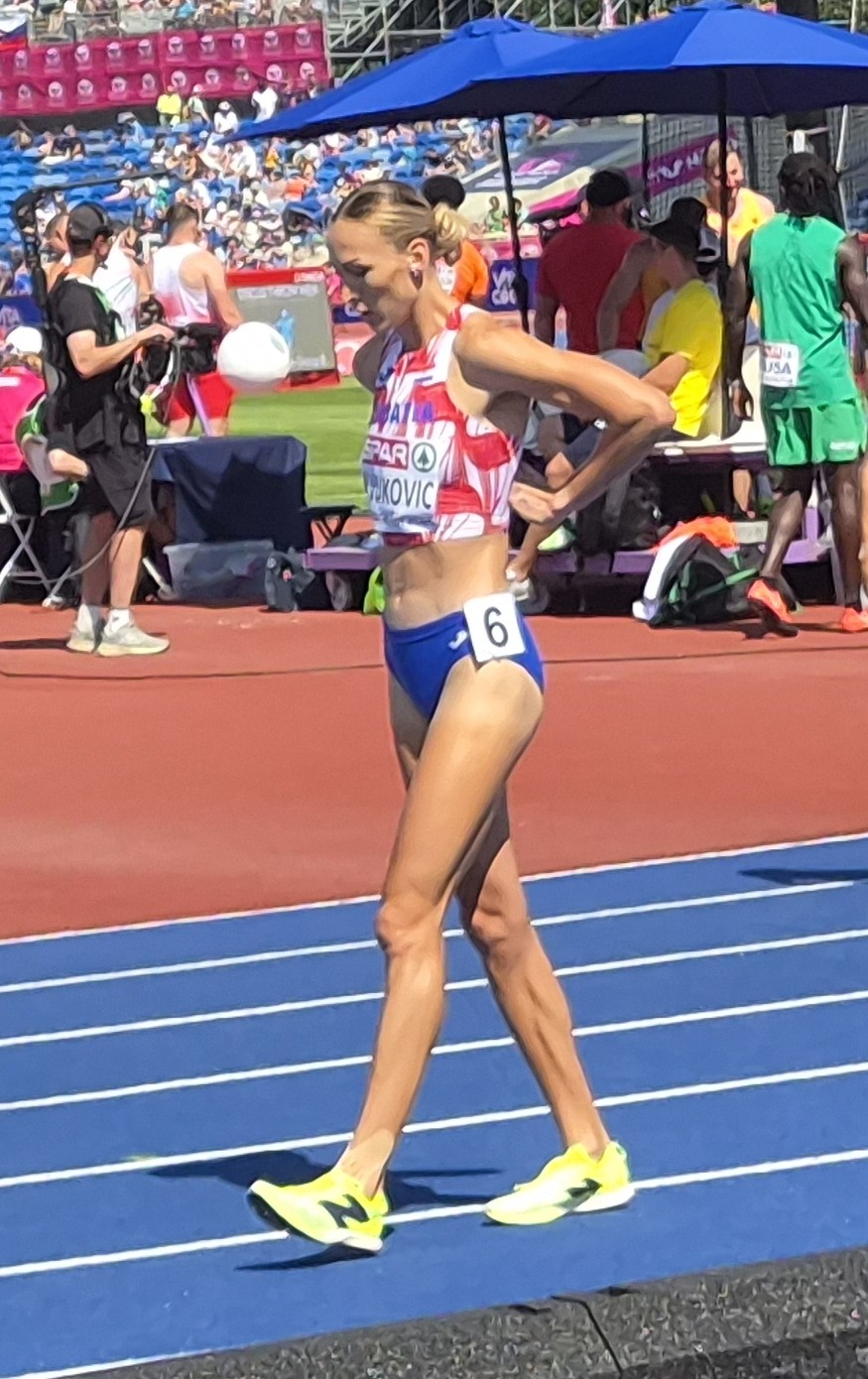
- 2026 European Championships

Personal information
- Nationality: Croatian
- Born: 3 June 2002 (age 24)

Sport
- Sport: Athletics
- Event: Middle-distance running

Achievements and titles
- Personal bests: 800 m: 1:58.38 (2026); Indoor; 800 m: 2:01.00 (2026)
Medal record
Women's athletics
Representing Croatia
Mediterranean Games
Gold medal – first place	2026 Taranto	800 m
Balkan Championships
Gold medal – first place	2026 Volos	800m

Nina Vuković (born 3 June 2002) is a Croatia middle-distance runner. She is a multiple-time national champion and Balkan Indoor and Outdoor champion over 800 metres.

== Biography ==
In her early years as a track and field athlete she set a new Croatian record for 16-year-olds in the 600 m. Vuković had started in athletics at in athletics at the MK Velika Gorica Athletics School before becoming a member of Dinamo Zagreb Athletics Club. She won the 2023 Mediterranean U23 Indoor Championships title over 800 metres, and placed fifth overall in the 800 m at the 2023 European Athletics U23 Championships in Espoo, Finland. In 2023, she placed second over 800 metres at the 2023 Balkan Athletics Championships with a time of 2:02.62 and represented Croatia at the European Athletics Team Championships.

In February 2024, she won the 800 metres title at the 2024 Balkan Athletics Indoor Championships in Istanbul in February 2024, with a new personal best time for the indoor 800 metres of 2:01.75. She competed that June at the 2024 European Athletics Championships in Rome, Italy.

She was runner-up to Caroline Bredlinger at the 2025 Balkan Athletics Indoor Championships in Belgrade in February 2025. The following month, she was selected for the 2025 European Athletics Indoor Championships in Apeldoorn, Netherlands. Competing in the 800 metres at the championships, she ran a time of 2:05.94 in her heat and did not progress to the semi-finals.

She won the 800 metres gold medal at the 2026 Balkan Athletics Indoor Championships in 2:01.70. She competed at the 2026 World Athletics Indoor Championships, running 2:01.53 but missing qualification for the semi-finals by seven hundredths of a second.

On 26 June, she ran an 800 metres personal best at the Boris Hanzekovic Memorial in Zagreb, a World Athletics Continental Tour Gold meeting, with 2:00.06. In July, she ran the 800 m in 2:00.41 to win ahead of Great Britain's Grace Vans Agnew at the Cork City Sports in Ireland. In August, she competed at the 2026 European Athletics Championships in Birmingham, England, in the women's 800 metres, reaching the semi-finals having ran a new personal best of 1:58.38. On 18 September, she won over 800 metres at the Janusz Kusocinski Memorial in Silesia.
