= Elif Polat =

Turkish sprinter (born 1999)

- Elif Polat at the 2021 Islamic Solidarity Games (2022)

Personal information
- Nationality: Turkey
- Born: 23 January 1999 (age 27) Antalya, Turkey
- Education: Sports science (Akdeniz University)

Sport
- Sport: Sprinter
- Club: Enkaspor
- Coached by: Semra Pekyılmaz, Naime Şen
Medal record
Women's athletics
Representing Turkey
Mediterranean Games
Bronze medal – third place	2026 Taranto	4 × 100 m relay NR
Islamic Solidarity Games
Bronze medal – third place	2021 Konya	4 × 100 m relay NR
Silver medal – second place	2021 Konya	4 × 400 m relay
Balkan Championships
Silver medal – second place	2026 Volos	200 m
Gold medal – first place	2025 Volos	Mixed 4 x 400 m relay
Bronze medal – third place	2020 Cluj-Napoca	200 m
Balkan Indoor Championships
Bronze medal – third place	2026 Belgrade	400 m
Bronze medal – third place	2026 Belgrade	4 x 400 m relay
Bronze medal – third place	2025 Belgrade	4 x 400 m relay
Gold medal – first place	2024 Istanbul	4 x 400 m relay
Silver medal – second place	2021 Istanbul	4 x 400 m relay

Elif Polat (born 23 January 1999) is a Turkish female sprinter, who competes in 100 m, 200 m, 400 m and occasionally in the relay events. She is a member of Enkaspor, and represents Turkey at international competitions.

== Sport career ==
Polat won the silver medal in the 200 m event at the 2020 Ukrainian Indoor Championships in Sumy. She took the bronze medal in the 200 m event at the 2020 Balkan Championships in Cluj-Napoca, Romania.

She won the silver medal in the 4 x 400 m relay event with Nevin İnce, Zeynep Kuran, Emel Şanlı-Kırçın at the 2021 Balkan Indoor Championships in Istanbul, Turkey.

At the 2021 Islamic Solidarity Games in Konya, Turket, which was postponed to 2022 due to COVID-19 pandemic in Turkey, she won the bronze medal in the 4 × 100 m relay event with Simay Özçiftçi, Şevval Ayaz, Cansu Nimet Sayın, and the sişlver medal in the 4 × 400 m relay event with Ekaterina Guliyev, Büşra Yıldırım, Edanur Tulum.

In 2023, she won the first place in the 100 m and 200 m events at the Turkish Inter-University Athletcis Championships in Manisa.

She captured the gold medal in the 4 x 400 m relay event with Sıla Koloğlu, Büşra Yıldırım, Edanur Tulum at the 2024 Balkan Indoor Championships in Istanbul.

At the 2025 Balkan Indoor Championships i Belgrade, she and her teammates Sıla Koloğlu, Elif Ilgaz, Edanur Tulum became bronze medalist in the 4 x 400 m relay event. That same year, she won the gold medal in the mixed 4 x 400 m relay event with Deniz Kaan Kartal, Oǧuzhan Kaya, Gülşah Cebeci̇ at the 2025 Balkan Championships in Volos, Greece.

On 16 Febrıary 2026, she reclaimed the Turkish indoor 300 m record with 37.70, she had previously set, which had been broken later by Sıla Koloğlu. At the 2026 Balkan Indoor Championships in Belgrade, Serbia, she took bronze medals şn the 400 m and 4 x 400 m relay event with Zeynep Özkara, Elif Ilgaz, Edanur Tulum . She won the silver medal in the 200 m event at the 2026 Balkan Championships in Volos. She competed at the 2026 Mediterranean Games in Taranto, Italy. She won the bronze medal in the 200 m, the women's 4 × 100 m relay with Sıla Koloğlu, Simay Özçiftçi, Büşra Akay. The team set a new national record with 44.05.

== Personal life ==
Elif Polat was born in Antalya, southwestern Turkey on 23 January 1999.

She stadied in the Faculty of Sports science at the Akdeniz University in her hometown.
