= Dimitrios Tsitsos =

Greek javelin thrower (born 2000)

Personal information
- Born: 27 September 2000 (age 25)

Sport
- Sport: Athletics
- Event: Javelin throw
Medal record
Men's athletics
Representing Greece
Balkan Championships
| Gold medal – first place | 2025 Volos | Javelin throw |
| Gold medal – first place | 2026 Volos | Javelin throw |
European U20 Championships
| Bronze medal – third place | 2019 Borås | Javelin throw |

Dimitrios Tsitsos (born 27 September 2000) is a Greek javelin thrower. He won the Balkan Athletics Championships in 2025 and 2026.

== Biography ==
Tsitsos won the bronze medal at the 2019 European Athletics U20 Championships in Sweden, with a throw of 77.79 metres. After a period of injury, he improved his personal best set in 2021 of 78.22 metres with a throw of 79.05 metres in Slovenia in June 2025. He won the Balkan Athletics Championships in 2025 in Volos, with a winning throw of 78.30 metres.

Tsitsos placed fourth with a throw of 79.46 metres at the 2026 European Throwing Cup in Nicosia, Cyprus. He retained his title at the 2026 Balkan Athletics Championships with a throw of 78.68 metres in June. The following month, he won the Greek Championships with a personal best 80.56 metres. He was a finalist at the 2026 European Athletics Championships in Birmingham, England, with a personal best throw of 80.95 metres. The throw moved him to seventh on the Greek all-time list.
