= Büşra Akay =

Turkish sprinter (born 2005)

Personal information
- Nationality: Turkey
- Born: 17 May 2005 (age 21) Turkey

Sport
- Sport: Sprinter
- Club: Beşiktaş Athletics
Medal record
Women's athletics
Representing Turkey
Mediterranean Games
Bronze medal – third place	2026 Taranto	4 × 100 m relay NR
Balkan Championships
Silver medal – second place	2026 Volos	4 × 100 m relay

Büşra Akay (born 17 May 2005) is a Turkish female sprinter, who specializes in the 100 m and 200 m events. She occasionally competes in the 4 x 100 m relay event. She was a member of Enkaspor, before she transferred to Beşiktaş Athletics. She represents Turkey at international competitions.

== Sport career ==
Akay finished seventh in the 100 m event at the 2024 Mediterranean U23 Championships held in Ismailia, Egypt. That same year, she became the Turkish champion by winning the 200 meters at the Turkish Indoor Athletics Championships.

At the Second Division of the 2025 European Team Championships in Maribor, Slovenia, the Turkish women's 4×100 m relay team, comprising Akay, Sıla Koloğlu, Simay Özçiftçi and Beyzanur Seylan, finished fourth in Race A with a time of 44.61 and seventh in the overall standings. This result also set a Turkish U23 record. Competing with the same relay team at the 2025 European U23 Championships in Bergen, Norway, she helped set a Turkish record of 44.42 but did not qualify for the final. At the 2025 Summer World University Games in Bochum, Germany, she, along with Sıla Koloğlu, Simay Özçiftçi, and Beyzanur Seylan, set a new Turkish senior and improved their own national U23 record in the women's 4×100 m relay with a time of 44.38. The Turkish team finished the final in sixth place with a time of 44.43.

She became champion in the 60 m event at the 2025 Turkish Indoor Championships in Istanbul. She won the silver medal in the women's 4 x 100 m relay event with Simay Özçiftçi, Bahar Öztürk, Beyzanur Seylan at the 2026 Balkan Championships in Volos, Greece. She competed at the 2026 Mediterranean Games in Taranto, Italy. She won the bronze medal in the 200 m, the women's 4 × 100 m relay with Sıla Koloğlu, Simay Özçiftçi, Elif Polat. The team set a new national record with 44.05.

== Personal life ==
Büşra Akay was born on 17 May 2005.

She is a student in the Faculty of Sports science at Gaziantep University.
