= Mia Wild =

Croatian athlete (born 2006)

Personal information
- Nationality: Croatian
- Born: 11 July 2006 (age 19)

Sport
- Sport: Athletics
- Event(s): 100 metres, 100 metres hurdles

Achievements and titles
- Personal bests: 100 m: 11.63 (2024); 100 mH: 13.10 (2024); Indoor: 60 m: 7.35 (2024); 60 mH: 8.06 (2025)
Medal record
Women's athletics
Representing Croatia
World U20 Championships
Silver medal – second place	2024 Lima	100 m hurdles
European Youth Olympic Festival
Gold medal – first place	2022 Banská Bystrica	100m hurdles

Mia Wild (born 11 July 2006) is a Croatian athlete. In 2024, she won national championships over 100 metres and 100 metres hurdles. She was a silver medalist in the 100m hurdles at the 2024 World Athletics U20 Championships. She won the 60 metres hurdles at the 2025 Balkan Athletics Indoor Championships and competed at the 2025 World Athletics Indoor Championships.

== Career ==
She won gold in the 100 metres hurdles at the 2022 European Youth Summer Olympic Festival in Banská Bystrica, Slovakia. She shared the gold medal with Laura Montauban in the 100 metres hurdles at the 2023 European Youth Summer Olympic Festival in Maribor.

She was a silver medalist in the 60 metres hurdles at the 2024 Balkan Athletics Indoor Championships in Istanbul in February 2024, running a time of 8.08 seconds. She was also a silver medalist in the 60 metres sprint, running 7.42 seconds.

In May 2024, she moved third on the all-time senior Croatian list when she ran 13.20 seconds for the 100 metres hurdles in Graz. She won the Croatian national titles in the 100 metres sprint and over 100m hurdles in June 2024.

She competed at the 2024 World Athletics U20 Championships in Lima, Peru, qualifying for the final of the 100 metres hurdles by winning her semi-final in a time of 13.42 seconds. She ran 13.15 seconds in the final to win the silver medal behind defending champion Kerrica Hill.

In February 2025, she won the 60 metres hurdles at the 2025 Balkan Athletics Indoor Championships in Belgrade. She competed at the 2025 European Athletics Indoor Championships in Apeldoorn, Netherlands, but did not qualify for the semi-finals of the 60 hurdles. She did qualify for the semi-finals of the 60 metres hurdles at the 2025 World Athletics Indoor Championships later that same month.

In June 2025, she won the B race and placed seventh overall in the 100 metres hurdles, and was part of the Croatian women's 4 x 100 metres relay team which set a new senior national record, whilst competing at the 2025 European Athletics Team Championships Second Division in Maribor; running 45.03 seconds alongside Melani Basic, Vita Penezić and Veronika Drljačić.

Wild won the 60 metres title at the 2026 Croatian Indoor Championships in Zagreb, running 7.46 seconds. Wild also ran 8.36 seconds to win the 60 metres hurdles at the championships.

== Personal life ==
She is from Nuštar and is a member of Slavonija-Žita in Osijek.
