= Mikdat Sevler =

Turkish athlete (born 1998)

Personal information
- Nationality: Turkish
- Born: 21 January 1998 (age 28)

Sport
- Sport: Athletics
- Event: Hurdles

Achievements and titles
- Personal bests: 60m hurdles: 7.68 (Belgrade, 2025) NR; 110m hurdles: 13.36 (Bursa, 2022) NR
Medal record
Men's athletics
Representing Turkey
European Team Championships
Bronze medal – third place	2025 Maribor	110 m hurdles
Balkan Indoor Championships
Gold medal – first place	2025 Belgrade	60 m hurdles

Mikdat Sevler (born 21 January 1998) is a Turkish hurdler. He is national record holder and a multiple-time national champion over 60m hurdles and 110m hurdles.

== Biography ==
In February 2016, he set a new Turkish junior record running 7.98 seconds for the 60m hurdles in Istanbul.

He set a new senior Turkish national record time of 7.85 seconds over 60m hurdles at the Balkan indoor championships in Istanbul in February 2019. The time allowed him to compete at the 2019 European Athletics Indoor Championships in Glasgow. In June 2019, Sevler lowered the Turkish 110 metres hurdles national record to 13.91 at the International Romanian Athletics Championships in Cluj.

He won his first indoors national title over 60m hurdles in Istanbul in February 2020. He won his first Turkish Athletics Championships title over 110m hurdles in Istanbul in September 2020.

He competed at the 2021 European Athletics Indoor Championships in Toruń, where he reached the semi-finals in a time of 7.78 seconds. In the semi-finals he ran a time of 7.74 seconds but did not progress to the final. He set a new Turkish national record time of 13.42 seconds at the Turkish Athletics Championships in Bursa in June 2021.

He lowered his own national record whilst competing at the 2022 World Athletics Indoor Championships in Belgrade, running 7.70 seconds for the 60m hurdles where he reached the semi finals. He lowered his 110m hurdles national record to 13.36 seconds at the Turkish Athletics Championships in June 2022. He then competed at the 2022 World Athletics Championships in Eugene, Oregon in July 2022. The following month, he competed at the 2022 European Athletics Championships in Munich.

He competed at the 2023 European Athletics Indoor Championships in Istanbul without reaching the final. He competed at the 2023 World Athletics Championships in Budapest.

He was selected for the 2024 World Athletics Indoor Championships in Glasgow.

In February 2025, he won the 60 metres hurdles at the 2025 Balkan Athletics Indoor Championships in Belgrade.

He won the bronze medal in the 110 m hurdles event with 13.61 setting his season's best record at the 2025 European Athletics Team Championships Second Division in Maribor, Slovenia, and contributed to her team's record with 14 points.

In August 2026, he ran in the men's 110 metres hurdles at the 2026 European Athletics Championships in Birmingham, England.
