= Rok Ferlan =

Slovenian sprinter

Personal information
- Nationality: Slovenian
- Born: 26 July 1997 (age 28)

Sport
- Sport: Athletics
- Event: Sprint

Achievements and titles
- Personal bests: 400m: 44.70 (Maribor, 2025) NR

Rok Ferlan (born 26 July 1997) is a Slovenian sprinter. He has represented his country at multiple-major championships and is the Slovenian national record holder over 400 metres.

== Career ==
He reached the semi-finals of the 400 metres at the 2024 World Athletics Indoor Championships in Glasgow, Scotland. He was also a semi-finalist in the 400 metres at the 2024 European Athletics Championships in Rome, running a personal best of 45.52 seconds.

He competed for Slovenia at the 2025 European Athletics Indoor Championships in Apeldoorn, Netherlands. He was runner-up to Alexander Doom in the 400 metres at the 2025 European Athletics Team Championships Second Division in Maribor, breaking the previous Slovenian national record set by Luka Janežič in 2017. In September 2025, he competed at the 2025 World Athletics Championships in Tokyo, Japan, reaching the as far as semi-finals of the men's 400 metres.
