= Balkan Athletics Indoor Championships =

Annual indoor track and field competition

Balkan Athletics Indoor Championships Βαλκανικοί Αγώνες Κλειστού Στίβου
- Purpose: Indoor track and field event between Balkan nations
- Frequency: Every year
- Inaugurated: 1994
- Organiser: Association of the Balkan Athletics Federations

The Balkan Athletics Indoor Championships, also known as the Balkan Indoor Games (Greek: Βαλκανικοί Αγώνες Κλειστού Στίβου), is an annual international regional indoor track and field competition between athletes from the Balkans. Following a test event in 1991, it was officially launched in 1994. Organised by the Association of the Balkan Athletics Federations (ABAF), it is typically held in February. The competition complemented the long-running annual outdoor track and field tournament: the Balkan Games.

It received strong support from the Hellenic Amateur Athletic Association – until 2002, the Peace and Friendship Stadium in Piraeus, Greece was the permanent host, as this was the only international standard indoor track and field arena in the region at that point. The Peania Indoors Arena, in the Metropolitan area of the Greek capital, took on hosting duties from 2003 to 2006, then began alternating with the Faliro, Piraeus stadium. The event was cancelled in both 2010 and 2011 due to the insolvency of the Greek athletics body, linked to the Greek government-debt crisis. The event was continued in 2012 with Turkey as the new host nation, which had built the Ataköy Athletics Arena for the 2012 IAAF World Indoor Championships. The Balkan competition served as a major test event for the global championships.

The programme of events has been similar to that of the IAAF World Indoor Championships, except for the omission of the combined track and field events and (usually) the 4 × 400 metres relay. Women's pole vault was introduced in 1998, giving the sexes event parity, and the 200 metres for both sexes was dropped after 2005 in line with international standards. The 1994 championships featured racewalking competitions, but these were dropped for subsequent editions. In addition to individual titles, a men's and a women's team title is awarded to the best performing nation in each section. Both medal tables and points tables are collated, with the points score contributing to the team title. The points table was introduced in 2002.

A total of seventeen nations have entered the competition during its history, with Yugoslavia and Serbia and Montenegro being former competitors; all successor states of Yugoslavia have since competed independently, bar Kosovo. The initial competition was between six nations, which expanded to nine by the end of the 1990s. The number of competing nations was further expanded between 2011 and 2014, with five more countries being admitted by the ABAF. Azerbaijan has also competed as a guest nation; its performances were discounted for medal and points-scoring purposes. Romania and Greece have historically been the most successful nations at the event, although Turkey has been the most dominant since 2012.

== Editions ==
Edition	Year	Stadium	City	Country	Dates	No. of events	No. of athletes	Men's winner^{[nb1]}	Women's winner^{[nb1]}
—	1991	Peace and Friendship Stadium	Piraeus	Greece	January	22		Romania	Romania
1	1994	Peace and Friendship Stadium	Piraeus	Greece	20 February	25		Romania	Romania
2	1995	Peace and Friendship Stadium	Piraeus	Greece	25 February	23		Greece	Romania
3	1996	Peace and Friendship Stadium	Piraeus	Greece	24 February	23		Greece	Romania
4	1997	Peace and Friendship Stadium	Piraeus	Greece	22 February	23		Greece	Romania
5	1998	Peace and Friendship Stadium	Piraeus	Greece	22 February	24		Romania	Romania
6	1999	Peace and Friendship Stadium	Piraeus	Greece	13 February	24		Greece	Romania
7	2000	Peace and Friendship Stadium	Piraeus	Greece	12 February	24		Bulgaria	Romania
8	2001	Peace and Friendship Stadium	Piraeus	Greece	18 February	24		Greece	Greece
9	2002	Peace and Friendship Stadium	Piraeus	Greece	23 February	24		Greece	Greece
10	2003	Peania Indoors Arena	Paiania	Greece	4 March	24		Romania	Greece
11	2004	Peania Indoors Arena	Paiania	Greece	28 February	24		Romania	Romania
12	2005	Peania Indoors Arena	Paiania	Greece	16 February	24		Greece	Romania
13	2006	Peania Indoors Arena	Paiania	Greece	22 February	22		Romania	Romania
14	2007	Peace and Friendship Stadium	Piraeus	Greece	21 February	22		Romania	Romania
15	2008	Peania Indoors Arena	Paiania	Greece	9 February	22		Romania	Romania
16	2009	Peace and Friendship Stadium	Piraeus	Greece	21 February	22		Romania	Romania
—	2010	Cancelled							
—	2011	Cancelled							
17	2012	Ataköy Athletics Arena	Istanbul	Turkey	18 February	22		Greece	Turkey
18	2013	Ataköy Athletics Arena	Istanbul	Turkey	23 February	22		Turkey	Romania
19	2014	Ataköy Athletics Arena	Istanbul	Turkey	22 February	22		Turkey	Romania
20	2015	Ataköy Athletics Arena	Istanbul	Turkey	21 February	22		Turkey	Turkey
21	2016	Ataköy Athletics Arena	Istanbul	Turkey	27 February	22		Romania	Romania
22	2017	Kombank Arena	Belgrade	Serbia	25 February	22		Turkey	Greece
23	2018	Ataköy Athletics Arena	Istanbul	Turkey	17 February	24		Romania	Romania
24	2019	Ataköy Athletics Arena	Istanbul	Turkey	16 February	24		Turkey	Ukraine
25	2020	Ataköy Athletics Arena	Istanbul	Turkey	15 February	24		Ukraine	Romania
26	2021	Ataköy Athletics Arena	Istanbul	Turkey	20 February	24		Turkey	Ukraine
27	2022	Ataköy Athletics Arena	Istanbul	Turkey	5 March	24		Turkey	Turkey
28	2024	Ataköy Athletics Arena	Istanbul	Turkey	10 February	24			
29	2025	Atletska dvorana	Belgrade	Serbia	15 February	24			
30	2026	Atletska dvorana	Belgrade	Serbia	21 February	24			

- ^{nb1} Team winners decided by medals up to 2001, with the points scoring format introduced in 2002.

== Ranking ==
Year	Ranking by Medals			
Year	1	2	3	Source
1994	Romania	Bulgaria	Greece	
1995	Romania	Greece	Bulgaria	
1996-2021
2022	Turkey	Romania	Slovenia	
2024	Turkey	Romania	Slovenia	

== Medals (1994-2024) ==
Rank	Nation	Gold	Silver	Bronze	Total
1	Romania	208	144	110	462
2	Greece	130	148	118	396
3	Bulgaria	82	103	91	276
4	Turkey	74	94	98	266
5	Serbia	31	35	45	111
6	Croatia	22	18	25	65
7	Yugoslavia	16	26	53	95
8	Albania	16	10	18	44
9	Ukraine	15	12	8	35
10	Slovenia	14	11	11	36
11	Bosnia and Herzegovina	13	9	13	35
12	Moldova	12	16	18	46
13	Cyprus	9	8	5	22
14	Armenia	6	4	4	14
15	Israel	3	0	6	9
16	Austria	2	2	3	7
17	Azerbaijan	2	1	1	4
18	Montenegro	1	7	3	11
19	North Macedonia	1	5	7	13
20	Georgia	1	4	3	8
21	Kosovo	0	2	0	2
Totals (21 entries)		658	659	640	1,957

== Participation ==
Nation	First appearance
Greece	1991
Albania	1991
Bulgaria	1991
Romania	1991
Turkey	1991
North Macedonia	1996
Moldova	1996
Bosnia and Herzegovina	1998
Serbia	2007
Montenegro	2007
Croatia	2011
Armenia	2013
Cyprus	2014
Slovenia	2014
Georgia	2014
Israel	2016?
Ukraine	2019
Yugoslavia†	1991
Serbia and Montenegro†	1994–2002^{[nb2]} 2003–2006

- Note: † = former competing nation
- ^{nb2} As Federal Republic of Yugoslavia

== Championships records ==
Key: Defunct event

=== Men ===
Event	Record	Athlete	Nationality	Date	Meet	Place	Ref.
60 m	6.53	Hristo Iliev	Bulgaria	21 February 2026	2026 Championships	Belgrade, Serbia	
200 m	21.25	Ioan Vieru	Romania	28 February 2004	2004 Championships	Paiania, Greece	
400 m	46.35	Iliya Dzhivondov	Bulgaria	12 February 2000	2000 Championships	Athens, Greece	
800 m	1:48.19	Oleg Myronets	Ukraine	20 February 2021	2021 Championships	Istanbul, Turkey	
1500 m	3:37.49	İlham Tanui Özbilen	Turkey	23 February 2013	2013 Championships	Istanbul, Turkey	
3000 m	7:42.49	Polat Kemboi Arıkan	Turkey	18 February 2012	2012 Championships	Istanbul, Turkey	
60 m hurdles	7.57	Gheorghe Boroi	Romania	20 February 1994	1994 Championships	Athens, Greece	
High jump	2.32 m	Cristian Popescu	Romania	20 February 1994	1994 Championships	Athens, Greece	
Pole vault	5.76 m	Ivan Horvat	Croatia	25 February 2017	2017 Championships	Belgrade, Serbia	
Long jump	8.12 m	Bozhidar Sarâboyukov	Bulgaria	15 February 2025	2025 Championships	Belgrade, Serbia	
Triple jump	17.51 m	Marian Oprea	Romania	22 February 2006	2006 Championships	Paiania, Greece	
Shot put	20.89 m	Andrei Toader	Romania	15 February 2025	2025 Championships	Belgrade, Serbia	
4 × 400 m relay	3:10.36	Andrei Remus; Mihai Dringo; Simon Denis; Robert Parge	Romania	5 March 2022	2022 Championships	Istanbul, Turkey	

=== Women ===
Event	Record	Athlete	Nationality	Date	Meet	Place	Ref.
60 m	7.13	Tezdzhan Naimova	Bulgaria	21 February 2007	2007 Championships	Athens, Greece	
200 m	23.70	Angela Moroșanu	Romania	16 February 2005	2005 Championships	Paiania, Greece	
400 m	51.06	Vania Stambolova	Bulgaria	22 February 2006	2006 Championships	Paiania, Greece	
800 m	1:59.82	Mihaela Neacșu	Romania	21 February 2007	2007 Championships	Athens, Greece	
1500 m	4:06.89	Luiza Gega	Albania	27 February 2016	2006 Championships	Istanbul, Turkey	
3000 m	8:55.22	Cristina Grosu	Romania	23 February 2002	2002 Championships	Athens, Greece	
60 m hurdles	8.02	Andrea Ivančević	Croatia	27 February 2016	2016 Championships	Istanbul, Turkey	
High jump	1.97 m	Stefka Kostadinova	Bulgaria	20 February 1994	1994 Championships	Athens, Greece	
Pole vault	4.60 m	Iana Gladiichuk	Ukraine	20 February 2021	2021 Championships	Istanbul, Turkey	
Long jump	6.96 m	Ivana Španović	Serbia	25 February 2017	2017 Championships	Belgrade, Serbia	
Triple jump	14.84 m	Hrysopiyi Devetzi	Greece	4 March 2003	2003 Championships	Paiania, Greece	
Shot put	19.30 m	Anca Heltne	Romania	21 February 2009	2009 Championships	Athens, Greece	
4 × 400 m relay	3:33.76	Kateryna Klymiuk; Tetiana Melnyk; Anastasiia Bryzgina; Anna Ryzhykova	Ukraine	16 February 2019	2019 Championships	Istanbul, Turkey	
