= Ertan Özkan =

Turkish sprinter (born 1996)

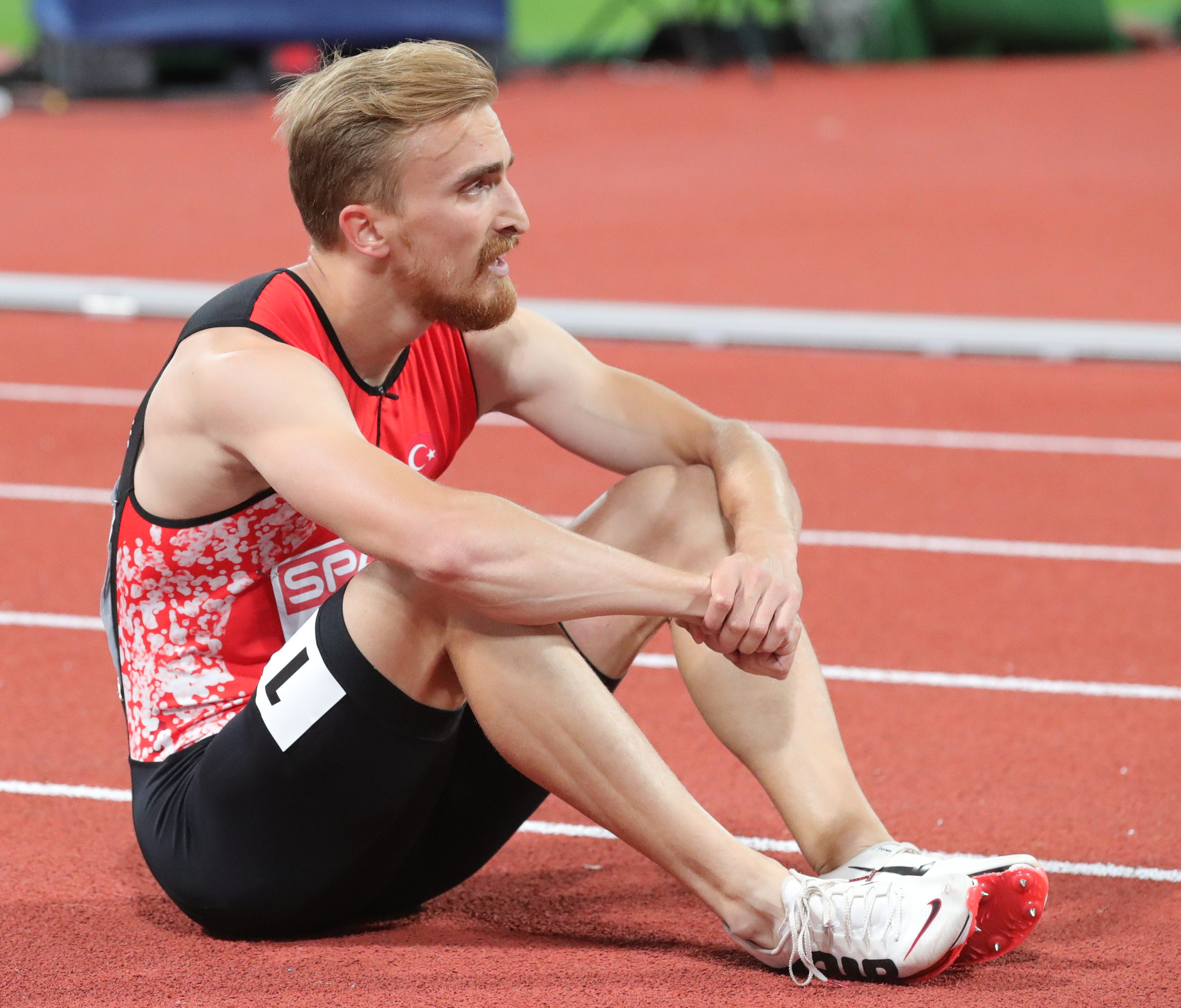

Personal information
- Nationality: Turkish
- Born: 1 September 1996 (age 30) Bursa, Turkey

Sport
- Sport: Athletics
- Event: 100 metres
Medal record
Men's athletics
Representing Turkey
Mediterranean Games
Silver medal – second place	2022 Oran	4×100 m relay
Silver medal – second place	2026 Taranto	4×100 m relay

Ertan Özkan (born 1 September 1996) is a Turkish athlete. He competed in the men's 4 × 100 metres relay event at the 2020 Summer Olympics.
