= List of Mediterranean Games records in athletics =

The Mediterranean Games records in athletics set by athletes who are representing one of the nations bordering the Mediterranean Sea at the Mediterranean Games. Records are recognised by International Mediterranean Games Committee (CIJM) and have been updated after the last Games, held in Mersin, Turkey in 2013.

== Men's records ==
Event	Record	Name	Nationality	Date	Games	Ref.
100 m	10.10 (−0.6 m/s)	Jak Ali Harvey	Turkey	28 June 2018	Tarragona 2018	
200 m	20.02 (−0.6 m/s)	Yassine Hssine	Morocco	1 September 2026	Taranto 2026	
400 m	44.92	Omar Elkhatib	Portugal	1 September 2026	Taranto 2026	
800 m	1:44.00 NR	Ilham Tanui Özbilen	Turkey	29 June 2013	Mersin 2013	
1500 m	3:29.20	Noureddine Morceli	Algeria	20 June 1993	Narbonne 1993	
5000 m	13:25.29	Alberto García	Spain		Bari 1997	
10,000 m	28:05.74	Ismaïl Sghyr	Morocco		Bari 1997	
Half marathon	1:02:06	Ali Kaya	Turkey	3 September 2026	Taranto 2026	
Marathon	2:18:42	Davide Milesi	Italy	20 June 1993	Narbonne 1993	
110 m hurdles	13.22 (+0.3 m/s)	Erwann Cinna	France	31 August 2026	Taranto 2026	
400 m hurdles	48.27	Yasmani Copello	Turkey	1 July 2022	Oran 2022	
3000 m steeplechase	8:13.11	Jamel Chatbi	Morocco	2 July 2009	Pescara 2009	
High jump	2.34 m	Konstadinos Baniotis	Greece	27 June 2013	Mersin 2013	
Pole vault	5.75 m	Ersu Şaşma	Turkey	2 July 2022	Oran 2022	
Long jump	8.29 m (+0.9 m/s)	Salim Sdiri	France	3 July 2009	Pescara 2009	
Triple jump	17.13 m	Marios Hadjiandreou	Cyprus		Athens 1991	
Triple jump	17.13 m (+1.4 m/s)	Daniele Greco	Italy	26 June 2013	Mersin 2013	
Shot put	21.29 m	Armin Sinančević	Serbia	30 June 2022	Oran 2022	
Discus throw	68.70 m	Kristjan Čeh	Slovenia	31 August 2026	Taranto 2026	
Hammer throw	78.49 m	Nicola Vizzoni	Italy	14 September 2001	Radès 2001	
Javelin throw	89.22 m	Kostas Gatsioudis	Greece	16 June 1997	Bari 1997	
Decathlon	8127 pts	Romain Barras	France	29–30 June 2005	Almería 2005	
Decathlon	100m (wind) / Long jump (wind) / Shot put / High jump / 400m / 110m H (wind) / Discus / Pole vault / Javelin / 1500m; 11.40 (−1.1 m/s) / 7.19 m (−0.9 m/s) / 14.76 m / 1.96 m / 48.84 / 14.35 (−0.9 m/s) / 42.22 m / 4.90 m / 64.67 m / 4:28.48					
20 km walk (road)	1:22:33	Ivano Brugnetti	Italy	30 June 2009	Pescara 2009	
4 × 100 m relay	38.49	Federico Cattaneo; Eseosa Desalu; Davide Manenti; Filippo Tortu	Italy	30 June 2018	Tarragona 2018	
4 × 400 m relay	3:02.02	Berke Akçam; İhsan Selçuk; Kubilay Ençü; İsmail Nezir	Turkey	2 September 2026	Taranto 2026	

Key:
^{WR} World record	^{ER} European record	^{NR} National record	^{PB} Athlete's personal best

== Women's records ==
Event	Record	Name	Nationality	Date	Games	Ref.
100 m	11.10 (+0.5 m/s)	Bassant Hemida	Egypt	30 June 2022	Oran 2022	
200 m	22.47 (+0.9 m/s) NR	Bassant Hemida	Egypt	3 July 2022	Oran 2022	
400 m	50.30	Libania Grenot	Italy	2 July 2009	Pescara 2009	
800 m	1:59.63	Nina Vuković	Croatia	31 August 2026	Taranto 2026	
1500 m	4:04.06	Siham Hilali	Morocco	26 June 2013	Mersin 2013	
3000 m	8:45.68	Roberta Brunet	Italy		Athens 1991	
5000 m	15:00.69	Roberta Brunet	Italy		Bari 1997	
10,000 m	31:16.94	Asmae Leghzaoui	Morocco	12 September 2001	Radès 2001	
Half marathon	1:09:59	Fatima Birdaha	Morocco	3 September 2026	Taranto 2026	
Marathon	2:39:22	Serap Aktaş	Turkey	15 June 1997	Bari 1997	
100 m hurdles	12.75 (−1.0 m/s)	Celeste Polzonetti	Italy	31 August 2026	Taranto 2026	
400 m hurdles	54.22	Ayomide Folorunso	Italy	2 September 2026	Taranto 2026	
3000 m steeplechase	9:04.28	Marwa Bouzayani	Tunisia	1 September 2026	Taranto 2026	
High jump	1.98 m	Sara Simeoni	Italy		Split 1979	
Pole vault	4.60 m	Tina Šutej	Slovenia	30 August 2026	Taranto 2026	
Long jump	6.99 m (+1.8 m/s)	Ivana Španović	Serbia	27 June 2018	Tarragona 2018	
Triple jump	14.98 m (+0.2 m/s)	Baya Rahouli	Algeria	1 July 2005	Almería 2005	
Shot put	19.42 m	Auriol Dongmo	Portugal	31 August 2026	Taranto 2026	
Discus throw	66.46 m	Sandra Perković	Croatia	28 June 2018	Tarragona 2018	
Hammer throw	73.67 m	Alexandra Tavernier	France	27 June 2018	Tarragona 2018	
Javelin throw	65.93 m	Adriana Vilagoš	Serbia	1 September 2026	Taranto 2026	
Heptathlon	6256 pts	Nathalie Teppe	France		Narbonne 1993	
Heptathlon	100m H (wind) / High jump / Shot put / 200m (wind) / Long jump (wind) / Javelin / 800m; / 1.85 m					
10 km walk (road)	44:40	Elisabetta Perrone	Italy		Bari 1997	
20 km walk (road)	1:32:44	Elisa Rigaudo	Italy	30 June 2005	Almería 2005	
4 × 100 m relay	42.63	Frédérique Bangué; Christine Arron; Patricia Girard; Sylviane Félix	France	18 June 1997	Bari 1997	
4 × 400 m relay	3:28.08	Maria Benedicta Chigbolu; Ayomide Folorunso; Raphaela Lukudo; Libania Grenot	Italy	30 June 2018	Tarragona 2018	

Key:
^{WR} World record	^{ER} European record	^{NR} National record	^{PB} Athlete's personal best

== Mixed records ==
Event	Record	Name	Nationality	Date	Games	Ref.
4 × 100 m relay	40.98	Eric Marek; Dalia Kaddari; Filippo Cappelletti; Alice Pagliarini	Italy	2 September 2026	Taranto 2026	
4 × 400 m relay	3:14.85	Kubilay Ençü; Simay Özçiftçi; Ismail Nezir; Sila Kologlu	Turkey	2 September 2026	Taranto 2026	
