= Aleksandrija Mitrović =

Serbian athlete (born 2004)

- Mitrović at the 2026 Balkan Indoor Championships.

Personal information
- Nationality: Serbia
- Born: Aleksandrija Mitrović; 14 April 2004 (age 22) Tashkent, Uzbekistan
- Height: 1.74 m (5 ft 9 in)
- Weight: 51 kg (112 lb)

Sport
- Sport: Athletics
- Event: Triple jump
- Club: AK Novi Belgrade
- Coached by: Slobodan Stojic

Achievements and titles
- Personal bests: Triple jump: 13.93 m (2026); Long jump: 6.10 m (2023); High jump: 1.77 m (2020); Indoors; Triple jump: 13.67 m (2026)
Medal record
Women's Athletics
Representing Serbia
European U20 Championships
Bronze medal – third place	2023 Jerusalem	Triple jump
European U23 Championships
Bronze medal – third place	2025 Bergen	Triple jump
Mediterranean Games
Bronze medal – third place	2026 Taranto	Triple jump

Aleksandrija Mitrović (born 14 April 2004) is a Serbian track and field athlete who specializes in the triple jump.

== Career ==
Aleksandrija Mitrović gained her first experience at international championships in 2020, when she placed ninth in the high jump at the U20 Balkan Indoor Championships in Istanbul with a jump of 1.70 m.

The following year, Mitrović placed sixth in the high jump at the U20 Balkan Indoor Championships in Sofia with a jump of 1.73 m.

In 2022, she won the silver medal in the triple jump at the U20 Balkan Championships in Denizli with a jump of 12.78 m. After the 2022 indoor season, Mitrović shifted her competitive focus away from the high jump and towards the horizontal jumps, particularly the triple jump.

In 2023, Mitrović placed seventh in the triple jump at the Balkan Championships in Kraljevo with a jump of 13.43 m. That August, she won the bronze medal at the U20 European Championships in Jerusalem with a jump of 13.40 m.

In 2024, Mitrović placed seventh at the Balkan Indoor Championships in Istanbul with a jump of 13.39 m, and in May, she finished eleventh at the Balkan Outdoor Championships in Izmir with a jump of 13.21 m.

The following year, she won the Balkan Indoor Championships in Belgrade with a jump of 13.59 m. That July, Mitrović won the bronze medal at the U23 European Championships in Bergen with a jump of 13.84 m, finishing behind Alexia Dospin of Romania and Clémence Rougier of France. Shortly thereafter, she placed eighth at the Balkan Championships in Volos with a jump of 13.52 m.

In 2026, Mitrović placed sixth at the Balkan Indoor Championships in Belgrade with a jump of 13.49 m. That August, she competed in her first European Championships where she jumped a personal best of 13.93 m and finished 15th in qualification.

== Personal Bests ==
Event	Performance	Date	Location
Triple jump	13.93 m (+0.9)	10 August 2026	Birmingham, UK
Long jump	6.10 m	23 December 2023	Belgrade, Serbia
High Jump	1.77 m	26 September 2020	Sremska Mitrovica, Serbia

=== National titles ===
- Serbian Athletics Championships
  - Triple jump: 2023
- Serbian Indoor Athletics Championships
  - Triple jump: 2024, 2025

=== Balkan titles ===
- Balkan Indoor Athletics Championships
  - Triple jump: 2025
