= 2025 European Athletics U23 Championships – Women's triple jump =

Women's triple jump at the 2025 European Athletics U23 Championships
- Venue: Fana Stadion
- Location: Bergen, Norway
- Dates: 17 July (qualification); 18 July (final)
- Competitors: 20 from 15 nations
- Winning distance: 14.05 m

Medalists
gold medal	Alexia Ioana Dospin	Romania
silver medal	Clémence Rougier	France
bronze medal	Aleksandrija Mitrović	Serbia

The women's triple jump event at the 2025 European Athletics U23 Championships was held in Bergen, Norway, at Fana Stadion on 17 and 18 July.

== Records ==
Prior to the competition, the records were as follows:

Record	Athlete (nation)	Distance (m)	Location	Date
European U23 record	Anna Pyatykh (RUS)	14.79 m	Florence, Italy	21 June 2003
Championship U23 record	Cristina Nicolau (ROU)	14.70 m	Gothenburg, Sweden	1 August 1999

== Results ==
=== Qualification ===
All athletes over 13.45 m (Q) or at least the 12 best performers (q) advance to the final.

==== Group A ====
Place	Athlete	Nation	#1	#2	#3	Result	Notes
1	Aleksandrija Mitrović	Serbia	13.31 (+2.1 m/s)	13.59 (+1.2 m/s)		13.59 m (+1.2 m/s)	Q
2	Ruth Hildebrand	Germany	13.22 (+2.9 m/s)	13.58 (+2.5 m/s)		13.58 m (+2.5 m/s)	Q
3	Alyona Chass	Ukraine	13.41 (+2.1 m/s)	x	-	13.41 m (+2.1 m/s)	q
4	Sedef Çevik	Turkey	x	x	13.06 (−0.3 m/s)	13.06 m (−0.3 m/s)	q
5	Katharina Gråman	Sweden	11.35 (+2.8 m/s)	12.89 (+3.0 m/s)	12.79 (+0.4 m/s)	12.89 m (+3.0 m/s)	
6	Antriana Gkogka	Greece	12.46 (±0.0 m/s)	12.37 (+1.9 m/s)	12.57 (−0.4 m/s)	12.57 m (−0.4 m/s)	
7	Rachela Pace	Malta	x	x	12.56 (+1.3 m/s)	12.56 m (+1.3 m/s)	
8	Tamara Balajová	Slovakia	12.31 (+1.7 m/s)	12.55 (+2.2 m/s)	12.34 (−1.0 m/s)	12.55 m (+2.2 m/s)	
9	Amelia Kubala	Poland	x	x	12.46 (+1.9 m/s)	12.46 m (+1.9 m/s)	
10	Marieta Minasyan	Armenia	11.65 (+2.8 m/s)	11.69 (+2.5 m/s)	11.60 (+1.4 m/s)	11.69 m (+2.5 m/s)	

==== Group B ====
Place	Athlete	Nation	#1	#2	#3	Result	Notes
1	Kadriye Dilek Durmuş	Turkey	x	13.79 m (+2.5 m/s)		13.79 m (+2.5 m/s)	Q
2	Greta Brugnolo	Italy	13.56 m (+2.5 m/s)			13.56 m (+2.5 m/s)	Q
3	Svitlana Boichuk	Ukraine	13.48 m (+3.3 m/s)			13.48 m (+3.3 m/s)	Q
4	Alexia Ioana Dospin	Romania	13.47 m (+1.5 m/s)			13.47 m (+1.5 m/s)	Q
5	Natalija Dragojević	Serbia	x	13.21 (+2.4 m/s)	13.42 m (+1.5 m/s)	13.42 m (+1.5 m/s)	q, PB
6	Sotiria Rapti	Greece	x	13.38 m (+1.9 m/s)	13.23 (+1.9 m/s)	13.38 m (+1.9 m/s)	q
7	Clémence Rougier	France	13.35 m (+2.5 m/s)	x	x	13.35 m (+2.5 m/s)	q
8	Adéla Sochorová	Czech Republic	13.04 (+1.9 m/s)	13.08 (+2.4 m/s)	13.18 m (+1.6 m/s)	13.18 m (+1.6 m/s)	q
9	Hilal Mutlu	Turkey	x	x	12.82 m (+1.9 m/s)	12.82 m (+1.9 m/s)	
10	Polina Eskina	Israel	12.56 (+2.5 m/s)	12.72 m (+1.2 m/s)	x	12.72 m (+1.2 m/s)	

=== Final ===
Place	Athlete	Nation	#1	#2	#3	#4	#5	#6	Result	Notes
1st place, gold medalist(s)	Alexia Ioana Dospin	Romania	13.53 (+2.4 m/s)	13.89 (+1.5 m/s)	14.05 (+1.8 m/s)	x	x	x	14.05 m (+1.8 m/s)	PB
2nd place, silver medalist(s)	Clémence Rougier	France	x	x	13.61 (±0.0 m/s)	13.31 (+1.7 m/s)	13.93 (+2.3 m/s)	13.85 (+2.1 m/s)	13.93 m (+2.3 m/s)	
3rd place, bronze medalist(s)	Aleksandrija Mitrović	Serbia	x	13.84 (+1.8 m/s)	13.59 (+2.0 m/s)	x	x		13.84 m (+1.8 m/s)	
4	Alyona Chass	Ukraine	x	x	13.48 (+2.4 m/s)	13.75 (+1.1 m/s)	x	x	13.75 m (+1.1 m/s)	PB
5	Kadriye Dilek Durmuş	Turkey	13.17 (+1.0 m/s)	x	13.43 (+2.6 m/s)	13.44 (+1.5 m/s)	x	13.58 (+1.1 m/s)	13.58 m (+1.1 m/s)	PB
6	Ruth Hildebrand	Germany	x	13.43 (+2.7 m/s)	x	x	13.53 (+2.8 m/s)	11.42 (+2.6 m/s)	13.53 m (+2.8 m/s)	
7	Sedef Çevik	Turkey	13.10 (+2.9 m/s)	13.44 (+1.9 m/s)	x	12.96 (+1.4 m/s)	x	13.17 (+0.4 m/s)	13.44 m (+1.9 m/s)	PB
8	Greta Brugnolo	Italy	13.31 (+1.5 m/s)	13.20 (+1.1 m/s)	13.39 (+1.3 m/s)	12.66 (+1.8 m/s)	x	x	13.39 m (+1.3 m/s)	PB
9	Adéla Sochorová	Czech Republic	12.79 (+1.0 m/s)	13.34 (+3.0 m/s)	13.22 (+1.7 m/s)				13.34 m (+3.0 m/s)	
10	Svitlana Boichuk	Ukraine	12.90 (+1.3 m/s)	13.30 (+1.4 m/s)	13.26 (+2.6 m/s)				13.30 m (+1.4 m/s)	
11	Natalija Dragojević	Serbia	13.21 (+1.8 m/s)	x	13.27 (+1.6 m/s)				13.27 m (+1.6 m/s)	
12	Sotiria Rapti	Greece	13.13 (+2.3 m/s)	x	13.16 (+1.8 m/s)				13.16 m (+1.8 m/s)	
