= Athletics at the 2026 Mediterranean Games =

2026 Athletics at the Mediterranean Games

- Dates: 30 August – 3 September
- Host city: Taranto, Italy
- Venue: Stadio di atletica Giuseppe Valente
- Participation: 412 athletes from 25 nations

The athletics competitions at the 2026 Mediterranean Games in Taranto, Italy took place from 30 August to 3 September at the Stadio di atletica Giuseppe Valente.

== Medal table ==
* Host nation (Italy)

| Rank | Nation | Gold | Silver | Bronze | Total |
|---|---|---|---|---|---|
| 1 | Italy* | 13 | 9 | 11 | 33 |
| 2 | Morocco | 7 | 4 | 5 | 16 |
| 3 | Portugal | 6 | 2 | 1 | 9 |
| 4 | France | 4 | 6 | 6 | 16 |
| 5 | Turkey | 3 | 3 | 9 | 15 |
| 6 | Algeria | 3 | 2 | 3 | 8 |
| 7 | Cyprus | 2 | 2 | 0 | 4 |
| 8 | Slovenia | 2 | 1 | 2 | 5 |
| 9 | Tunisia | 1 | 2 | 0 | 3 |
| 10 | Croatia | 1 | 1 | 4 | 6 |
| 11 | Serbia | 1 | 1 | 1 | 3 |
| 12 | Montenegro | 1 | 0 | 0 | 1 |
| 13 | Spain | 0 | 6 | 0 | 6 |
| 14 | Greece | 0 | 5 | 1 | 6 |
| 15 | Egypt | 0 | 0 | 1 | 1 |
| Totals (15 entries) | | 44 | 44 | 44 | 132 |

== Medal summary ==
=== Men's events ===
| Event | Gold | | Silver | | Bronze | |
|---|---|---|---|---|---|---|
| 100 metres | Yassine Hssine; Morocco | 10.31 | Eric Marek; Italy | 10.41 | Anej Čurin Prapotnik; Slovenia | 10.43 |
| 200 metres | Yassine Hssine; Morocco | 19.94 w | Filippo Dezza; Italy | 20.22 w | Théo Schaub; France | 20.52 w |
| 400 metres | Omar Elkhatib; Portugal | 44.92 GR | Dylan Mileau; France | 45.16 PB | Lorenzo Benati; Italy | 45.32 |
| 800 metres | Djamel Sedjati; Algeria | 1:46.00 | David Barroso; Spain | 1:46.35 | Marino Bloudek; Croatia | 1:46.58 |
| 1500 metres | Flavien Szot; France | 3:43.03 | Anis Chott; Algeria | 3:43.19 | Anass Essayi; Morocco | 3:43.20 |
| 5000 metres | José Carlos Pinto; Portugal | 14:41.11 | Mohamed Amin Jhinaoui; Tunisia | 14:41.55 | Fouad Messaoudi; Morocco | 14:41.75 |
| 10000 metres | Said Ameri; Algeria | 28:31.26 PB | Mustapha Akkaoui; Morocco | 28:38.50 SB | Hicham Ouladha; Morocco | 28:56.64 |
| 110 metres hurdles | Erwann Cinna; France | 13.22 GR | Milan Trajkovic; Cyprus | 13.25 SB | Thomas Wilkes; France | 13.40 |
| 400 metres hurdles | Ismail Manyani; Morocco | 48.87 | İsmail Nezir; Turkey | 49.01 | Berke Akçam; Turkey | 49.55 |
| 3000 metres steeplechase | Salaheddine Ben Yazide; Morocco | 8:46.14 | Mohamed Tindouft; Morocco | 8:46.58 | Omar Seraiche; Algeria | 8:47.31 |
| 4 × 100 metres relay | Italy; Lorenzo Ianes; Damiano Dentato; Filippo Cappelletti; Filippo Randazzo | 39.03 | Turkey; Ertan Özkan; Kayhan Özer; Batuhan Altintas; Oguz Uyar | 39.09 | Slovenia; Staš Tin Lorbar; Filip Oiclj; Andrej Skočir; Anej Čurin Prapotnik | 39.29 |
| 4 × 400 metres relay | Turkey; Berke Akçam; İhsan Selçuk; Kubilay Ençü; İsmail Nezir | 3:02.02 GR | Morocco; Rachid Mhamdi; Walid El Boussiri; Ismail Manyani; Mohamed Yassine Zerhoumi | 3:02.21 | Italy; Federico Falsetti; Riccardo Meli; Lapo Bianciardi; Luca Sito | 3:02.73 |
| Half marathon | Ali Kaya; Turkey | 1:02:06 GR | Mohammed Sief Boukartaba; Algeria | 1:03:26 PB | Ramazan Bastug; Turkey | 1:04:08 |
| High jump | Gianmarco Tamberi; Italy | 2.25 m | Antonios Merlos; Greece | 2.19 m | Christian Falocchi; Italy | 2.15 m |
| Pole vault | Mathieu Collet; France | 5.70 m | Ersu Sasma; Turkey | 5.70 m | Matteo Oliveri; Italy | 5.65 m |
| Long jump | Francesco Inzoli; Italy | 8.19 m | Filip Pravdica; Croatia | 8.14 m | Tarek Hocine; Algeria | 8.03 m PB |
| Triple jump | Yasser Triki; Algeria | 16.97 m | Federico Lorenzo Bruno; Italy | 16.16 m | Can Özüpek; Turkey | 16.14 m |
| Shot put | Nick Ponzio; Italy | 21.21 m | Stephen Mailagi; France | 20.21 m | Mohamed Magdi Hamza; Egypt | 20.21 m SB |
| Discus throw | Kristjan Čeh; Slovenia | 68.70 m GR | Diego Casas; Spain | 65.62 m | Alessio Mannucci; Italy | 63.89 m SB |
| Hammer throw | Iosif Kesidis; Cyprus | 77.99 m | Christos Frantzeskakis; Greece | 77.59 m | Matija Gregurić; Croatia | 76.03 m SB |
| Javelin throw | Giovanni Frattini; Italy | 81.59 m SB | Michele Fina; Italy | 77.41 m | Felise Vaha'i Sosaia; France | 76.55 m |

=== Women's events ===
| Event | Gold | | Silver | | Bronze | |
|---|---|---|---|---|---|---|
| 100 metres | Gemima Joseph; France | 11.33 | Polyniki Emmanouilidou; Greece | 11.43 | Arialis Gandulla; Portugal | 11.43 |
| 200 metres | Vittoria Fontana; Italy | 22.93 SB | Rafaéla Spanoudaki-Hatziriga; Greece | 23.07 SB | Sila Kologlu; Turkey | 23.12 |
| 400 metres | Salma Lehlali; Morocco | 51.26 PB | Alessandra Bonora; Italy | 51.41 | Alice Mangione; Italy | 51.49 |
| 800 metres | Nina Vuković; Croatia | 1:59.63 GR | Lorea Ibarzabal; Spain | 2:00.07 | Souad Elhaddad; Morocco | 2:00.15 |
| 1500 metres | Patrícia Silva; Portugal | 4:08.41 | Souad Elhaddad; Morocco | 4:08.51 | Silan Ayyildiz; Turkey | 4:09.79 |
| 5000 metres | Fatima Birdaha; Morocco | 15:07.40 PB | Micol Majori; Italy | 15:21.86 | Silan Ayyildiz; Turkey | 15:23.08 SB |
| 10000 metres | Federica Del Buono; Italy | 35:02.28 | Mariana Machado; Portugal | 35:05.10 | Kaoutar Farkoussi; Morocco | 35:13.57 |
| 100 metres hurdles | Celeste Polzonetti; Italy | 12.75 GR | Elena Carraro; Italy | 12.79 SB | Sacha Alessandrini; France | 12.94 |
| 400 metres hurdles | Ayomide Folorunso; Italy | 54.22 GR | Louise Maraval; France | 54.68 | Alice Muraro; Italy | 54.95 |
| 3000 metres steeplechase | Marwa Bouzayani; Tunisia | 9:04.28 GR | Rihab Dhahri; Tunisia | 9:21.87 SB | Clara Entresangle; France | 9:22.88 |
| 4 × 100 metres relay | Portugal; Rosalina Santos; Catarina Lourenço; Beatriz Castelhano; Arialis Gandulla | 43.57 | Greece; Sofia Iosifidou; Rafaéla Spanoudaki-Hatziriga; Dimitra Tsoukala; Polyniki Emmanouilidou | 43.61 | Turkey; Büsra Akay; Sila Kologlu; Simay Özçiftçi; Elif Polat | 44.05 |
| 4 × 400 metres relay | Italy; Clarissa Vianelli; Sara Cirillo; Ginevra Ricci; Ilaria Accame | 3:29.89 | France; Marina Lasserre; Seynabou Camara; Noam Tanon; Méta Tumba | 3:32.24 | Turkey; Simay Özçiftçi; Silan Ayyildiz; Elif Polat; Sila Kologlu | 3:40.99 |
| Half marathon | Fatima Birdaha; Morocco | 1:09:59 GR | Klara Lukan; Slovenia | 1:11:22 | Matea Parlov Koštro; Croatia | 1:11:58 SB |
| High jump | Marija Vuković; Montenegro | 1.94 m | Elena Kulichenko; Cyprus | 1.92 m SB | Idea Pieroni; Italy | 1.90 m |
| Pole vault | Tina Šutej; Slovenia | 4.60 m GR | Bérénice Petit; France | 4.45 m | Sonia Malavisi; Italy | 4.45 m |
| Long jump | Filippa Fotopoulou; Cyprus | 6.59 m | Carmen Rosales; Spain | 6.50 m | Arianna Battistella; Italy | 6.45 m |
| Triple jump | Erika Saraceni; Italy | 14.21 m | Ivana Španovic; Serbia | 14.09 m | Aleksandrija Mitrović; Serbia | 13.69 m |
| Shot put | Auriol Dongmo; Portugal | 19.42 m GR | Jessica Inchude; Portugal | 18.86 m | Sara Verteramo; Italy | 16.79 m |
| Discus throw | Irina Rodrigues; Portugal | 62.51 m | Daisy Osakue; Italy | 60.96 m | Özlem Becerek; Turkey | 60.18 m |
| Hammer throw | Sara Fantini; Italy | 73.03 m | Laura Redondo; Spain | 67.82 m | Zahra Tatar; Algeria | 66.88 m |
| Javelin throw | Adriana Vilagoš; Serbia | 65.93 m GR | Yulenmis Aguilar; Spain | 65.39 m PB | Sara Kolak; Croatia | 62.64 m SB |

=== Mixed events ===
| Event | Gold | | Silver | | Bronze | |
|---|---|---|---|---|---|---|
| 4 × 100 metres relay | Italy; Eric Marek; Dalia Kaddari; Filippo Cappelletti; Alice Pagliarini | 40.98 GR | France; Joryan Siger; Vanessa Lokuli; Hugo Jacquet-Dzong; Romane Colletin | 41.50 | Greece; Vasilios Mirianthopoulos; Rafaéla Spanoudaki-Hatziriga; Sotirios Garaganis; Polyniki Emmanouilidou | 41.74 |
| 4 × 400 metres relay | Turkey; Kubilay Ençü; Simay Özçiftçi; İsmail Nezir; Sila Kologlu | 3:14.85 GR | Italy; Federico Falsetti; Sara Cirillo; Riccardo Meli; Ilaria Accame | 3:14.89 | France; Nel Martinez; Noam Tanon; Allan Lacroix; Seynabou Camara | 3:22.45 |

== Participating nations ==
- Albania (3)
- Algeria (19)
- Andorra (5)
- Bosnia and Herzegovina (4)
- Croatia (12)
- Cyprus (21)
- Egypt (7)
- France (73)
- Greece (27)
- Italy (78)
- Kosovo (3)
- Lebanon (2)
- Libya (1)
- Malta (7)
- Monaco (3)
- Montenegro (2)
- Morocco (25)
- North Macedonia (3)
- Portugal (18)
- San Marino (3)
- Serbia (13)
- Slovenia (15)
- Spain (23)
- Tunisia (7)
- Turkey (38)

== Men's results ==
=== 100 metres ===
Heats – 30 August
Wind:
Heat 1: -3.0 m/s, Heat 2: -1.8 m/s

| Rank | Heat | Name | Nationality | Time | Notes |
|---|---|---|---|---|---|
| 1 | 2 | Yassine Hssine | Morocco | 10.38 | Q |
| 2 | 1 | Anej Čurin Prapotnik | Slovenia | 10.43 | Q |
| 3 | 1 | Eric Marek | Italy | 10.47 | Q |
| 4 | 1 | Kayhan Özer | Turkey | 10.49 | Q |
| 5 | 2 | Delvis Santos | Portugal | 10.53 | Q |
| 6 | 2 | Sotirios Garaganis | Greece | 10.59 | Q |
| 7 | 2 | Ertan Özkan | Turkey | 10.62 | q |
| 8 | 2 | Roberto Rigali | Italy | 10.64 | q |
| 9 | 1 | Ioannis Voskopoulos | Greece | 10.65 | |
| 10 | 1 | Staš Tin Lorbar | Slovenia | 10.66 | |
| 11 | 1 | Noureddine Hadid | Lebanon | 10.84 | |
| 12 | 2 | Graham Pellegrini | Malta | 11.05 | |
| 13 | 1 | Thomas Caredda | Monaco | 11.25 | |
| 14 | 2 | Teo Bottin | Monaco | 11.47 | |
| | 2 | Francesco Sansovini | San Marino | DNS | |

Final – 30 August

Wind: -2.8 m/s

| Rank | Lane | Name | Nationality | Time | Notes |
|---|---|---|---|---|---|
| 1st place, gold medalist(s) | 3 | Yassine Hssine | Morocco | 10.31 | |
| 2nd place, silver medalist(s) | 4 | Eric Marek | Italy | 10.41 | |
| 3rd place, bronze medalist(s) | 5 | Anej Čurin Prapotnik | Slovenia | 10.43 | |
| 4 | 6 | Delvis Santos | Portugal | 10.45 | |
| 5 | 8 | Ertan Özkan | Turkey | 10.52 | |
| 6 | 2 | Kayhan Özer | Turkey | 10.56 | |
| 7 | 7 | Sotirios Garaganis | Greece | 10.60 | |
| 8 | 1 | Roberto Rigali | Italy | 10.72 | |

=== 200 metres ===
Heats – 1 September
Wind:
Heat 1: -0.6 m/s, Heat 2: -1.0 m/s

| Rank | Heat | Name | Nationality | Time | Notes |
|---|---|---|---|---|---|
| 1 | 1 | Yassine Hssine | Morocco | 20.02 | Q |
| 2 | 1 | Filippo Dezza | Italy | 20.44 | Q |
| 3 | 1 | Théo Schaub | France | 20.57 | Q |
| 4 | 2 | Andoni Calbano | Spain | 20.64 | Q |
| 5 | 2 | Skander Djamil Athmani | Algeria | 20.80 | Q |
| 6 | 2 | Ogur Uyar | Turkey | 20.80 | Q |
| 7 | 2 | Filippo Tortu | Italy | 20.86 | q |
| 8 | 2 | Delvis Santos | Portugal | 21.07 | q |
| 9 | 1 | Deniz Kaan Kartal | Turkey | 21.16 | q* |
| 10 | 1 | Noureddine Hadid | Lebanon | 21.17 | q* |
| 11 | 1 | Nikolaos Panagiotopoulos | Greece | 21.18 | |
| 12 | 2 | Vasileio Myrianthopoulos | Greece | 21.29 | |
| 13 | 2 | Andrej Skočir | Slovenia | 21.52 | |
| 14 | 1 | Graham Pellegrini | Malta | 21.81 | |
| 15 | 2 | Alessandro Gasperoni | San Marino | 21.99 | |

Final – 2 September

Wind: +4.3 m/s

| Rank | Lane | Name | Nationality | Time | Notes |
|---|---|---|---|---|---|
| 1st place, gold medalist(s) | 7 | Yassine Hssine | Morocco | 19.94 | GR |
| 2nd place, silver medalist(s) | 6 | Filippo Dezza | Italy | 20.22 | |
| 3rd place, bronze medalist(s) | 8 | Théo Schaub | France | 20.52 | |
| 4 | 5 | Andoni Calbano | Spain | 20.58 | |
| 5 | 3 | Ogur Uyar | Turkey | 20.82 | |
| 6 | 4 | Skander Djamil Athmani | Algeria | 20.96 | |
| 7 | 1 | Deniz Kaan Kartal | Turkey | 21.13 | |
| 8 | 2 | Noureddine Hadid | Lebanon | 21.40 | |
| | – | Delvis Santos | Portugal | DNS | |
| | – | Filippo Tortu | Italy | DNS | |

q* Qualified as reserve

=== 400 metres ===
Heats – 31 August

| Rank | Heat | Name | Nationality | Time | Notes |
|---|---|---|---|---|---|
| 1 | 2 | Mohamed Yassine Zerhoum | Morocco | 45.11 | Q |
| 2 | 3 | Omar Elkhatib | Portugal | 45.45 | Q |
| 3 | 2 | Dylan Mileau | France | 45.45 | Q |
| 4 | 2 | Luca Sito | Italy | 45.46 | q |
| 5 | 1 | Lorenzo Benati | Italy | 45.54 | Q |
| 6 | 1 | Benoit Moudio Priso | France | 45.68 | Q |
| 7 | 1 | Abdennour Bendjema | Algeria | 45.87 | q |
| 8 | 3 | Rachid M'Hamdi | Morocco | 45.89 | Q |
| 9 | 3 | Kubilay Encu | Turkey | 45.91 | |
| 10 | 2 | Franko Burraj | Albania | 46.19 | |
| 11 | 1 | Ihsan Selcuk | Turkey | 46.70 | |
| 12 | 3 | Bosko Kijanovic | Serbia | 46.75 | |
| 13 | 2 | Pavlos Nikolaou | Cyprus | 46.77 | |
| 14 | 2 | Matthew Galea Soler | Malta | 47.18 | |
| 15 | 1 | Spyridon Ioannis Konidaris | Greece | 47.39 | |
| | 1 | João Coelho | Portugal | DQ | |
| | 3 | Jorge García | Spain | DQ | |
| | 3 | Rami Balti | Tunisia | DNF | |

Final – 1 September

| Rank | Lane | Name | Nationality | Time | Notes |
|---|---|---|---|---|---|
| 1st place, gold medalist(s) | 7 | Omar Elkhatib | Portugal | 44.92 | GR |
| 2nd place, silver medalist(s) | 5 | Dylan Mileau | France | 45.16 | PB |
| 3rd place, bronze medalist(s) | 4 | Lorenzo Benati | Italy | 45.32 | |
| 4 | 6 | Mohamed Yassine Zerhoum | Morocco | 45.33 | |
| 5 | 3 | Rachid M'Hamdi | Morocco | 45.47 | SB |
| 6 | 8 | Benoit Moudio Priso | France | 45.74 | |
| 6 | 1 | Luca Sito | Italy | 45.74 | |
| 8 | 2 | Abdennour Bendjema | Algeria | 45.78 | |

=== 800 metres ===
Heats – 30 August

| Rank | Heat | Name | Nationality | Time | Notes |
|---|---|---|---|---|---|
| 1 | 1 | Djamel Sedjati | Algeria | 1:46.25 | Q |
| 2 | 1 | Marino Bloudek | Croatia | 1:46.33 | Q |
| 3 | 1 | Imad Bouchajda | Morocco | 1:46.44 | Q |
| 4 | 1 | Catalin Tecuceanu | Italy | 1:46.53 | q |
| 5 | 2 | David Barroso | Spain | 1:46.59 | Q |
| 6 | 2 | Slimane Moula | Algeria | 1:46.78 | Q |
| 7 | 2 | Jordan Terrasse | France | 1:46.81 | Q |
| 8 | 2 | Abdessalem Ayouni | Tunisia | 1:46.93 | q |
| 9 | 1 | Omer Faruk Bozdag | Turkey | 1:47.10 | |
| 10 | 1 | Josue Le Cadre | France | 1:47.38 | |
| 11 | 2 | Giovanni Lazzaro | Italy | 1:47.43 | |
| 12 | 2 | Jared Toshi Micallef | Malta | 1:48.06 | |
| 13 | 1 | Christoforos Koutlis | Greece | 1:49.33 | |
| 14 | 2 | Abedin Mujezinovic | Bosnia and Herzegovina | 1:49.44 | |
| 15 | 2 | Leon Thaqi | Kosovo | 1:49.80 | |
| 16 | 2 | Abderrahman El Assal | Morocco | 1:50.19 | |
| | 1 | Ahmed Essabai | Libya | DNF | |
| | 1 | Amel Tuka | Bosnia and Herzegovina | DNF | |

Final – 31 August

| Rank | Lane | Name | Nationality | Time | Notes |
|---|---|---|---|---|---|
| 1st place, gold medalist(s) | 4 | Djamel Sedjati | Algeria | 1:46.00 | |
| 2nd place, silver medalist(s) | 3 | David Barroso | Spain | 1:46.35 | |
| 3rd place, bronze medalist(s) | 5 | Marino Bloudek | Croatia | 1:46.58 | |
| 4 | 7 | Jordan Terrasse | France | 1:46.69 | |
| 5 | 6 | Slimane Moula | Algeria | 1:46.72 | |
| 6 | 8 | Imad Bouchajda | Morocco | 1:46.95 | |
| 7 | 2 | Catalin Tecuceanu | Italy | 1:47.10 | |
| 8 | 1 | Abdessalem Ayouni | Tunisia | 1:47.19 | |

=== 1500 metres ===
1 September

| Rank | Name | Nationality | Time | Notes |
|---|---|---|---|---|
| 1st place, gold medalist(s) | Flavien Szot | France | 3:43.03 | |
| 2nd place, silver medalist(s) | Anis Chott | Algeria | 3:43.19 | |
| 3rd place, bronze medalist(s) | Anass Essayi | Morocco | 3:43.20 | |
| 4 | Pietro Arese | Italy | 3:43.29 | |
| 5 | Mehmet Çelik | Turkey | 3:43.53 | |
| 6 | Salih Teksöz | Turkey | 3:43.81 | |
| 7 | Joao Bussotti | Italy | 3:43.96 | |
| 8 | Pol Moya | Andorra | 3:43.96 | |
| 9 | Nino Jambrešic | Croatia | 3:44.59 | |
| 10 | José Carlos Pinto | Portugal | 3:45.19 | |
| 11 | Abdessalem Ayouni | Tunisia | 3:47.59 | SB |
| 12 | Heithem Chenitef | Algeria | 3:48.50 | |
| 13 | Aldin Catovic | Serbia | 3:48.87 | |
| 14 | Jaouad Khchina | Morocco | 3:52.97 | |
| 15 | Anas Chaoudar | France | 4:31.76 | |

=== 5000 metres ===
1 September

| Rank | Name | Nationality | Time | Notes |
|---|---|---|---|---|
| 1st place, gold medalist(s) | José Carlos Pinto | Portugal | 14:41.11 | |
| 2nd place, silver medalist(s) | Mohamed Amin Jhinaoui | Tunisia | 14:41.55 | |
| 3rd place, bronze medalist(s) | Fouad Messaoudi | Morocco | 14:41.75 | |
| 4 | Simon Bedard | France | 14:41.83 | |
| 5 | Arthur Gervais | France | 14:42.48 | |
| 6 | Ahmed Jaziri | Tunisia | 14:43.89 | |
| 7 | Abdurrahman Gediklioglu | Turkey | 14:44.13 | |
| 8 | Sebastiano Parolini | Italy | 14:44.84 | |
| 9 | Konjoneh Maggi | Italy | 14:47.80 | |
| 10 | Said Ameri | Algeria | 14:49.54 | |

=== 10,000 metres ===
2 September

| Rank | Name | Nationality | Time | Notes |
|---|---|---|---|---|
| 1st place, gold medalist(s) | Said Ameri | Algeria | 28:31.26 | PB |
| 2nd place, silver medalist(s) | Mustapha Akkaoui | Morocco | 28:38.50 | SB |
| 3rd place, bronze medalist(s) | Hicham Ouladha | Morocco | 28:56.64 | |
| 4 | Miguel Baidal | Spain | 29:19.31 | |
| 5 | Thomas D'Este | Italy | 29:19.31 | |
| 6 | Antonin Marquant | France | 29:24.86 | |
| 7 | Dario Ivanovski | North Macedonia | 29:37.09 | |
| 8 | Lourenço Rodrigues | Portugal | 29:58.82 | |
| 9 | Gaston Rohmer | France | 30:05.02 | |
| 10 | Pablo Alba | Spain | 31:48.78 | |
| | Abderrazak Charik | Algeria | DNF | |

=== 110 metres hurdles ===
Heats – 30 August
Wind:
Heat 1: - 3.4 m/s, Heat 2: -2.9 m/s

| Rank | Heat | Name | Nationality | Time | Notes |
|---|---|---|---|---|---|
| 1 | 1 | Milan Trajkovic | Cyprus | 13.65 | Q |
| 2 | 2 | Thomas Wilkes | France | 13.76 | Q |
| 3 | 2 | Hugo Chapado | Spain | 14.00 | Q |
| 3 | 2 | Koray Uygun | Turkey | 14.00 | Q |
| 5 | 2 | Youssef Badawy Ramadan | Egypt | 14.09 | q |
| 6 | 1 | Erwann Cinna | France | 14.12 | Q |
| 7 | 1 | Filip Jakob Demšar | Slovenia | 14.16 | Q |
| 8 | 1 | Gonzalo Lamborena | Spain | 14.33 | q |
| 9 | 1 | Christos Roumtsios | Greece | 14.34 | |
| 10 | 2 | Oliver Mulas | Italy | 14.48 | |
| | 1 | Mikdat Sevler | Turkey | DNS | |

Final – 31 August

Wind: +0.3 m/s

| Rank | Lane | Name | Nationality | Time | Notes |
|---|---|---|---|---|---|
| 1st place, gold medalist(s) | 4 | Erwann Cinna | France | 13.22 | |
| 2nd place, silver medalist(s) | 5 | Milan Trajkovic | Cyprus | 13.25 | =NR |
| 3rd place, bronze medalist(s) | 6 | Thomas Wilkes | France | 13.40 | |
| 4 | 2 | Koray Uygun | Turkey | 13.52 | |
| 5 | 3 | Hugo Chapado | Spain | 13.53 | PB |
| 6 | 8 | Youssef Badawy Ramadan | Egypt | 13.77 | |
| 7 | 7 | Filip Jakob Demšar | Slovenia | 13.84 | |
| 8 | 1 | Gonzalo Lamborena | Spain | 13.90 | |

=== 400 metres hurdles ===
Heats – 1 September

| Rank | Heat | Name | Nationality | Time | Notes |
|---|---|---|---|---|---|
| 1 | 2 | Ismail Manyani | Morocco | 48.99 | Q |
| 2 | 2 | İsmail Nezir | Turkey | 49.11 | Q |
| 3 | 1 | Berke Akçam | Turkey | 49.33 | Q |
| 4 | 1 | Alessandro Sibilio | Italy | 49.57 | Q |
| 5 | 1 | Diogo Barrigana | Portugal | 49.59 | Q |
| 6 | 1 | Ludvy Vaillant | France | 49.67 | q |
| 7 | 1 | Elmehdi Dimoukrati | Morocco | 50.11 | q |
| 8 | 2 | Simon Deschamps | France | 50.67 | Q |
| 9 | 1 | Jovan Stojoski | North Macedonia | 52.61 | |
| 10 | 2 | Eloi Vilella Escolano | Andorra | 52.64 | |
| | 2 | Dimitri Levantinos | Greece | DNF | |
| | 2 | Mohamed Amine Adoini | Tunisia | DNS | |

Final – 2 September

| Rank | Lane | Name | Nationality | Time | Notes |
|---|---|---|---|---|---|
| 1st place, gold medalist(s) | 5 | Ismail Manyani | Morocco | 48.87 | |
| 2nd place, silver medalist(s) | 6 | İsmail Nezir | Turkey | 49.01 | |
| 3rd place, bronze medalist(s) | 4 | Berke Akçam | Turkey | 49.55 | |
| 4 | 3 | Diogo Barrigana | Portugal | 49.99 | |
| 5 | 2 | Elmehdi Dimoukrati | Morocco | 50.96 | |
| 6 | 1 | Ludvy Vaillant | France | 51.50 | |
| 7 | 7 | Alessandro Sibilio | Italy | 51.54 | |
| 8 | 8 | Simon Deschamps | France | 52.12 | |

=== 3000 metres steeplechase ===
2 September

| Rank | Name | Nationality | Time | Notes |
|---|---|---|---|---|
| 1st place, gold medalist(s) | Salaheddine Ben Yazide | Morocco | 8:46.14 | |
| 2nd place, silver medalist(s) | Mohamed Tindouft | Morocco | 8:46.58 | |
| 3rd place, bronze medalist(s) | Omar Seraiche | Algeria | 8:47.31 | |
| 4 | Nicolas-Marie Daru | France | 8:47.75 | |
| 5 | Oscar Thebaud | France | 8:50.02 | |
| 6 | Ahmed Jaziri | Tunisia | 8:51.53 | |
| 7 | Ala Zoghlami | Italy | 8:55.80 | |
| 8 | Lourenço Rodrigues | Portugal | 9:01.20 | |
| 9 | Nahuel Carabaña | Andorra | 9:07.76 | |
| | Mohamed Amin Jhinaoui | Tunisia | DNS | |
| | Osama Zoghlami | Italy | DNS | |

=== 4 × 100 metres relay ===
31 August

| Rank | Lane | Nation | Competitors | Time | Notes |
|---|---|---|---|---|---|
| 1st place, gold medalist(s) | 5 | Italy | Lorenzo Ianes, Damiano Dentato, Filippo Cappelletti, Filippo Randazzo (athlete) | 39.03 | |
| 2nd place, silver medalist(s) | 7 | Turkey | Ertan Özkan, Kayhan Özer, Batuhan Altintas, Oguz Uyar | 39.09 | |
| 3rd place, bronze medalist(s) | 4 | Slovenia | Staš Tin Lorbar, Filip Oiclj, Andrej Skočir, Anej Čurin Prapotnik | 39.29 | |
| 4 | 5 | Greece | Ioannis Voskopoulos, Nikolaos Panagiotopoulos, Sotirios Garaganis, Vasileios Myrianthopoulos | 39.42 | |

=== 4 × 400 metres relay ===
2 September

| Rank | Lane | Nation | Competitors | Time | Notes |
|---|---|---|---|---|---|
| 1st place, gold medalist(s) | 6 | Turkey | Berke Akçam, Ihsan Selçuk, Kubilay Ençü, İsmail Nezir | 3:02.02 | GR |
| 2nd place, silver medalist(s) | 7 | Morocco | Rachid Mhamdi, Walid El Boussiri, Ismail Manyani, Mohamed Yassine Zerhoumi | 3:02.21 | |
| 3rd place, bronze medalist(s) | 4 | Italy | Federico Falsetti, Riccardo Meli, Lapo Bianciardi, Luca Sito | 3:02.73 | |
| 4 | 5 | France | Dylan Mileau, Allan Lacroix, Simon Deschamps, Nel Martinez | 3:07.14 | |

=== Half marathon ===
3 September

| Rank | Name | Nationality | Time | Notes |
|---|---|---|---|---|
| 1st place, gold medalist(s) | Ali Kaya | Turkey | 1:02:06 | GR |
| 2nd place, silver medalist(s) | Mohammed Sief Boukartaba | Algeria | 1:03:26 | PB |
| 3rd place, bronze medalist(s) | Ramazan Bastug | Turkey | 1:04:08 | |
| 4 | Pasquale Selvarolo | Italy | 1:05:27 | |
| 5 | Quentin Bronchart | France | 1:06:18 | |
| 6 | Luke Micallef | Malta | 1:07:16 | |
| 7 | Dillon Cassar | Malta | 1:09:17 | |
| 8 | Julien Rabaca | France | 1:12:30 | |
| | Mustapha Allaoui | Morocco | DNF | |
| | Soufiyan Bouqantar | Morocco | DNF | |
| | Hicham Ouladha | Morocco | DNF | |
| | Julien Rebeck | France | DNF | |

=== High jump ===
1 September

| Rank | Name | Nationality | 2.05 | 2.10 | 2.15 | 2.19 | 2.22 | 2.25 | 2.27 | 2.29 | 2.35 | Result | Notes |
|---|---|---|---|---|---|---|---|---|---|---|---|---|---|
| 1st place, gold medalist(s) | Gianmarco Tamberi | Italy | – | – | o | – | – | o | – | – | xxx | 2.25 | |
| 2nd place, silver medalist(s) | Antonios Merlos | Greece | – | – | o | o | – | x– | – | xx | | 2.19 | |
| 3rd place, bronze medalist(s) | Christian Falocchi | Italy | – | – | o | xxx | | | | | | 2.15 | |
| 4 | Alperen Acet | Turkey | o | xo | xo | xxx | | | | | | 2.15 | |
| 5 | Sandro Jercen Tomassini | Slovenia | o | xo | xxo | xxx | | | | | | 2.15 | |
| 6 | Loizos Chrysostomou | Cyprus | o | xo | xxx | | | | | | | 2.10 | |
| 7 | Elijah Ch. Pasquier | France | o | xxx | | | | | | | | 2.05 | |

=== Pole vault ===
2 September

| Rank | Name | Nationality | 5.00 | 5.15 | 5.30 | 5.45 | 5.55 | 5.65 | 5.70 | 5.75 | Result | Notes |
|---|---|---|---|---|---|---|---|---|---|---|---|---|
| 1st place, gold medalist(s) | Mathieu Collet | France | – | – | – | o | – | o | o | xxx | 5.70 | |
| 2nd place, silver medalist(s) | Ersu Sasma | Turkey | – | – | – | – | xxo | – | xo | xxx | 5.70 | |
| 3rd place, bronze medalist(s) | Matteo Oliveri | Italy | – | – | o | xo | xo | o | xxx | | 5.65 | |
| 4 | Pedro Buaró | Portugal | – | – | – | xo | – | xo | – | xxx | 5.65 | |
| 5 | Dimitris Christofi | Cyprus | xo | o | xxx | | | | | | 5.15 | |
| 6 | Medhi-Amar Rouana | Algeria | – | xxo | xxx | | | | | | 5.15 | |
| 6 | Artur Coll | Spain | – | xxo | xxx | | | | | | 5.15 | |
| | Anthony Ammirati | France | – | – | – | – | xxx | | | | NM | |
| | Christos Tamanis | Cyprus | | | | | | | | | NM | |

=== Long jump ===
30 August

| Rank | Name | Nationality | #1 | #2 | #3 | #4 | #5 | #6 | Result | Notes |
|---|---|---|---|---|---|---|---|---|---|---|
| 1st place, gold medalist(s) | Francesco Inzoli | Italy | 8.05 | 8.05 | 7.86 | 8.14 | 8.19 | 8.19 | 8.19 | |
| 2nd place, silver medalist(s) | Filip Pravdica | Croatia | 7.82 | 7.64 | 7.80 | 7.32 | 8.14 | x | 8.14 | |
| 3rd place, bronze medalist(s) | Tarek Hocine | Algeria | 8.03 | 7.72 | - | 7.72 | - | x | 8.03 | PB |
| 4 | Luka Boškovic | Serbia | 7.80 | 7.94 | - | 7.90 | x | x | 7.94 | |
| 5 | Erwan Konaté | France | 7.42 | 7.86 | x | x | x | 7.57 | 7.86 | |
| 6 | Nikolaos Stamatonikolos | Greece | 7.60 | 7.66 | 7.78 | x | 7.83 | 7.76 | 7.83 | |
| 7 | Marko Vlahovic | Serbia | 7.55 | x | 7.78 | 7.61 | 7.74 | x | 7.78 | |
| 8 | Carlos Beltrán | Spain | x | 7.66 | x | x | x | x | 7.66 | |
| 9 | Andreas Trajkovski | North Macedonia | 7.54 | 7.63 | 7.59 | | | | 7.63 | |
| 10 | Jeremy Zammit | Malta | x | 7.61 | 7.03 | | | | 7.61 | SB |

=== Triple jump ===
2 September

| Rank | Name | Nationality | #1 | #2 | #3 | #4 | #5 | #6 | Result | Notes |
|---|---|---|---|---|---|---|---|---|---|---|
| 1st place, gold medalist(s) | Yasser Triki | Algeria | 16.61 | 16.97 | – | – | – | – | 16.97 | |
| 2nd place, silver medalist(s) | Federico Lorenzo Bruno | France | 15.35 | 15.41 | 15.75 | 15.85 | 16.16 | 15.93 | 16.16 | |
| 3rd place, bronze medalist(s) | Can Özüpek | Turkey | 15.60 | 14.00 | 16.14 | 15.71 | x | 13.89 | 16.14 | |
| 4 | Grigoris Nikolaou | Cyprus | x | 15.62 | 16.03 | x | 14.40 | 15.85 | 16.03 | |
| 5 | Alex Fabbri | Italy | x | 15.45 | 15.85 | 15.98 | 15.75 | 15.68 | 15.98 | |
| 6 | Antranik Sarkis Ashdjian | Cyprus | 14.95 | x | x | x | x | - | 14.95 | |

=== Shot put ===
1 September

| Rank | Name | Nationality | #1 | #2 | #3 | #4 | #5 | #6 | Result | Notes |
|---|---|---|---|---|---|---|---|---|---|---|
| 1st place, gold medalist(s) | Nick Ponzio | Italy | x | 19.99 | 21.21 | 20.16 | x | 20.90 | 21.21 | |
| 2nd place, silver medalist(s) | Stephen Mailagi | France | 19.26 | 20.21 | 18.80 | 19.50 | 19.82 | 20.19 | 20.21 | |
| 3rd place, bronze medalist(s) | Mohamed Magdi Hamza | Egypt | 19.45 | x | 20.21 | x | x | x | 20.21 | SB |
| 4 | Mostafa Amr Hassan | Egypt | 18.52 | 19.76 | x | x | 19.63 | 19.85 | 19.85 | SB |
| 5 | Armin Sinančević | Serbia | x | 19.47 | x | x | x | 19.83 | 19.83 | |
| 6 | Franck Elemba | France | 19.18 | x | x | 19.17 | 19.44 | x | 19.44 | |
| 7 | Riccardo Ferrara | Italy | 17.08 | 18.23 | 18.90 | 19.08 | x | x | 19.08 | |
| 8 | Konstantinos Gennikis | Greece | x | 18.32 | 18.89 | 18.56 | x | x | 18.89 | |
| 9 | Mesud Pezer | Bosnia and Herzegovina | 18.73 | 18.78 | x | | | | 18.78 | |
| 10 | Muhamet Ramadani | Kosovo | 18.72 | x | 18.47 | | | | 18.72 | |
| 11 | Petros Michaelides | Cyprus | 17.52 | 18.03 | x | | | | 18.03 | |

=== Discus throw ===
31 August

| Rank | Name | Nationality | #1 | #2 | #3 | #4 | #5 | #6 | Result | Notes |
|---|---|---|---|---|---|---|---|---|---|---|
| 1st place, gold medalist(s) | Kristjan Čeh | Slovenia | x | 67.82 | 66.18 | 68.70 | x | x | 68.70 | |
| 2nd place, silver medalist(s) | Diego Casas | Spain | 63.17 | 62.43 | x | 63.67 | 64.61 | 65.62 | 65.62 | |
| 3rd place, bronze medalist(s) | Alessio Mannucci | Italy | 59.36 | 57.18 | 61.92 | 60.56 | x | 68.70 | 63.89 | SB |
| 4 | Emanuel Sousa | Portugal | 57.85 | 58.36 | x | x | x | 61.82 | 61.82 | |
| 5 | Dimitrios Pavlidis | Greece | 59.21 | 58.52 | 59.90 | 60.56 | 60.93 | 60.92 | 60.93 | |
| 6 | Enrico Saccomano | Italy | x | 58.16 | 60.53 | x | x | 59.14 | 60.53 | |
| 7 | Iosif Michalis Papa | Cyprus | x | 58.71 | 57.63 | x | 56.10 | x | 58.71 | |
| 8 | Ömer Sahin | Turkey | 49.95 | 56.59 | 56.91 | 58.46 | x | 55.38 | 58.46 | |
| 9 | Marc-Alexandre Delin | France | x | 53.53 | x | | | | 53.53 | |
| 10 | Abdelmoutaleb Yagoub | Algeria | 51.08 | 52.27 | x | | | | 52.27 | |
| 11 | Gabin Guerci | France | 45.90 | 48.26 | 49.08 | | | | 49.08 | |

=== Hammer throw ===
30 August

| Rank | Name | Nationality | #1 | #2 | #3 | #4 | #5 | #6 | Result | Notes |
|---|---|---|---|---|---|---|---|---|---|---|
| 1st place, gold medalist(s) | Iosif Kesidis | Cyprus | x | 75.93 | 77.99 | 74.88 | 75.47 | 75.28 | 77.99 | |
| 2nd place, silver medalist(s) | Christos Frantzeskakis | Greece | x | 76.04 | 75.75 | 77.59 | 74.56 | x | 77.59 | |
| 3rd place, bronze medalist(s) | Matija Gregurić | Croatia | 75.89 | 74.68 | 76.03 | x | 74.82 | 74.98 | 76.03 | SB |
| 4 | Markelo Mema | Albania | 73.55 | 73.22 | 73.80 | 74.59 | 73.49 | x | 74.59 | |
| 5 | Georgios Papanastasiou | Greece | x | 72.11 | 74.42 | x | x | 74.31 | 74.42 | |
| 6 | Davide Costa | Italy | 72.25 | 71.19 | 71.74 | x | 71.44 | x | 72.25 | |
| 7 | Jan Emberšic | Slovenia | 68.60 | 70.99 | 72.00 | 71.62 | 71.32 | 72.08 | 72.08 | |
| 8 | Giorgio Olivieri | Italy | x | x | 71.48 | x | 71.41 | 71.46 | 71.48 | |
| 9 | Özkan Baltaci | Turkey | 71.07 | 71.07 | 71.39 | | | | 71.39 | |
| 10 | Halil Yilmazer | Turkey | 69.97 | x | x | | | | 69.97 | |
| 11 | Mostafa El Gamel | Egypt | 69.03 | 68.95 | x | | | | 69.03 | |

=== Javelin throw ===
30 August

| Rank | Name | Nationality | #1 | #2 | #3 | #4 | #5 | #6 | Result | Notes |
|---|---|---|---|---|---|---|---|---|---|---|
| 1st place, gold medalist(s) | Giovanni Frattini | Italy | 76.63 | 80.34 | 67.37 | 81.59 | 76.78 | 71.29 | 81.59 | SB |
| 2nd place, silver medalist(s) | Michele Fina | Italy | 70.87 | 66.68 | 76.24 | 77.41 | 71.60 | 69.04 | 77.41 | |
| 3rd place, bronze medalist(s) | Felise Vaha'i Sosaia | France | 69.97 | 70.88 | 73.45 | 74.04 | 76.55 | 74.66 | 76.55 | |
| 4 | Leandro Ramos | Portugal | 73.84 | 76.38 | 74.27 | 73.85 | x | 72.56 | 76.38 | |
| 5 | Manu Quijera | Spain | 67.78 | 72.81 | 72.87 | 72.55 | x | 74.61 | 74.61 | |
| 6 | Filip Dominkovic | Slovenia | x | 73.62 | 69.75 | 70.83 | x | 69.35 | 73.62 | |
| 7 | Lukas Moutarde | France | 69.03 | 70.25 | 70.43 | 72.97 | 68.55 | 67.98 | 72.97 | |
| 8 | Michael Criticos | Cyprus | 64.28 | 66.79 | 70.60 | 70.44 | x | 67.37 | 70.60 | |
| 9 | Muhammet Hanifi Zengin | Turkey | 68.02 | x | 65.57 | | | | 68.02 | |

== Women's results ==
=== 100 metres ===
Heats – 30 August
Wind:
Heat 1: -3.8 m/s, Heat 2: -3.2 m/s

| Rank | Heat | Name | Nationality | Time | Notes |
|---|---|---|---|---|---|
| 1 | 2 | Gemima Joseph | France | 11.53 | Q |
| 2 | 1 | Polyniki Emmanouilidou | Greece | 11.55 | Q |
| 3 | 2 | Alessia Pavese | Italy | 11.60 | Q |
| 4 | 2 | Beatriz Castelhano | Portugal | 11.74 | Q |
| 5 | 1 | Arialis Gandulla | Portugal | 11.75 | Q |
| 5 | 1 | Gloria Hooper | Italy | 11.75 | Q |
| 7 | 2 | Dimitra Tsoukala | Greece | 11.81 | q |
| 8 | 2 | Sara El Hachimi | Morocco | 11.84 | q |
| 9 | 2 | Aziza Sbaity | Lebanon | 11.90 | |
| 10 | 2 | Simay Özçiftçi | Turkey | 11.91 | |
| 11 | 1 | Grace Tade | France | 11.96 | |
| 12 | 1 | Alessandra Gasparelli | San Marino | 12.14 | |
| 13 | 1 | Büsra Akay | Turkey | 12.37 | |
| 14 | 1 | Claire Azzopardi | Turkey | 12.40 | |

Final – 30 August

Wind: -1.6 m/s

| Rank | Lane | Name | Nationality | Time | Notes |
|---|---|---|---|---|---|
| 1st place, gold medalist(s) | 6 | Gemima Joseph | France | 11.33 | |
| 2nd place, silver medalist(s) | 5 | Polyniki Emmanouilidou | Greece | 11.41 | |
| 3rd place, bronze medalist(s) | 4 | Arialis Gandulla | Portugal | 11.43 | |
| 4 | 2 | Gloria Hooper | Italy | 11.45 | |
| 5 | 3 | Alessia Pavese | Italy | 11.62 | |
| 6 | 7 | Beatriz Castelhano | Portugal | 11.63 | |
| 7 | 1 | Dimitra Tsoukala | Greece | 11.72 | |
| 8 | 8 | Sara El Hachimi | Morocco | 11.73 | |

=== 200 metres ===
Heats – 1 September

| Rank | Heat | Name | Nationality | Time | Notes |
|---|---|---|---|---|---|
| 1 | 2 | Rafaéla Spanoudaki-Hatziriga | Greece | 23.09 | Q |
| 2 | 2 | Vittoria Fontana | Italy | 23.16 | Q |
| 3 | 1 | Alba Borrero | Spain | 23.27 | Q |
| 3 | 2 | Sila Kologlu | Turkey | 23.27 | Q |
| 5 | 1 | Elif Polat | Turkey | 23.36 | Q |
| 6 | 2 | Sara El Hachimi | Morocco | 23.57 | q |
| 7 | 1 | Elena Cambiolo | Italy | 23.68 | Q |
| 8 | 2 | Shana Lambourde | France | 23.88 | q |
| 9 | 1 | Catarina Fonseca | Portugal | 24.05 | |
| 10 | 2 | Aziza aity | Lebanon | 24.07 | |
| 11 | 1 | Alessandra Gasparelli | San Marino | 24.18 | |
| 12 | 2 | Rosalina Santos | Portugal | 24.29 | |
| 13 | 1 | Veronika Drljačić | Croatia | 28.57 | |
| | 1 | Claire Azzopardi | Malta | DNS | |

Final – 2 September

| Rank | Lane | Name | Nationality | Time | Notes |
|---|---|---|---|---|---|
| 1st place, gold medalist(s) | 6 | Vittoria Fontana | Italy | 22.93 | SB |
| 2nd place, silver medalist(s) | 5 | Rafaéla Spanoudaki-Hatziriga | Greece | 23.07 | SB |
| 3rd place, bronze medalist(s) | 3 | Sila Kologlu | Turkey | 23.12 | |
| 4 | 7 | Alba Borrero | Spain | 23.26 | |
| 5 | 8 | Elif Polat | Turkey | 23.32 | |
| 6 | 4 | Elena Cambiolo | Italy | 23.52 | |
| 7 | 1 | Sara El Hachimi | Morocco | 23.68 | |
| 8 | 2 | Shana Lambourde | France | 23.89 | |

=== 400 metres ===
Heats – 31 August

| Rank | Heat | Name | Nationality | Time | Notes |
|---|---|---|---|---|---|
| 1 | 2 | Veronika Drljačić | Croatia | 51.80 | Q |
| 2 | 1 | Houda Nouiri | Morocco | 51.81 | Q |
| 3 | 2 | Salma Lehlali | Morocco | 51.83 | Q |
| 4 | 2 | Alessandra Bonora | Italy | 52.05 | Q |
| 5 | 1 | Alice Mangione | Italy | 52.06 | Q |
| 6 | 1 | Ana Prieto | Spain | 52.24 | Q |
| 7 | 2 | Marina Lasserre | France | 52.36 | q |
| 8 | 1 | Aleksandra Pešić | Serbia | 53.12 | q |
| 9 | 1 | Basant Mohamed Aw Hemida | Egypt | 53.31 | |
| 10 | 2 | Kalliopi Kountouri | Cyprus | 53.34 | |
| 11 | 2 | Anastasia Rapti | Greece | 53.69 | |
| 12 | 1 | Tekia Alexandrou | Cyprus | 54.35 | |

Final – 1 September

| Rank | Lane | Name | Nationality | Time | Notes |
|---|---|---|---|---|---|
| 1st place, gold medalist(s) | 5 | Salma Lehlali | Morocco | 51.26 | PB |
| 2nd place, silver medalist(s) | 3 | Alessandra Bonora | Italy | 51.41 | |
| 3rd place, bronze medalist(s) | 7 | Alice Mangione | Italy | 51.49 | |
| 4 | 8 | Ana Prieto | Spain | 51.50 | PB |
| 5 | 6 | Veronika Drljačić | Croatia | 51.64 | SB |
| 6 | 1 | Marina Lasserre | France | 51.92 | PB |
| 7 | 4 | Houda Nouiri | Morocco | 51.98 | PB |
| 8 | 2 | Aleksandra Pešić | Serbia | 53.80 | |

=== 800 metres ===
31 August

| Rank | Lane | Name | Nationality | Time | Notes |
|---|---|---|---|---|---|
| 1st place, gold medalist(s) | 4 | Nina Vuković | Croatia | 1:59.63 | GR |
| 2nd place, silver medalist(s) | 5 | Lorea Ibarzabal | Spain | 2:00.07 | |
| 3rd place, bronze medalist(s) | 7 | Souad Elhaddad | Morocco | 2:00.15 | |
| 4 | 6 | Charlotte Dumas | France | 2:00.91 | |
| 5 | 3 | Julia Cherot | France | 2:01.29 | |
| 6 | 2 | Maria Colajanni | Italy | 2:01.33 | |
| 7 | 1 | Emmanouela Plaka | Greece | 2:01.67 | |
| 8 | 8e | Ngalula Gloria Kabangu | Italy | 2:01.69 | |
| | 8i | Soukaina Hajji | Morocco | DNF | |

=== 1500 metres ===
2 September

| Rank | Name | Nationality | Time | Notes |
|---|---|---|---|---|
| 1st place, gold medalist(s) | Patrícia Silva | Portugal | 4:08.41 | |
| 2nd place, silver medalist(s) | Souad Elhaddad | Morocco | 4:08.51 | |
| 3rd place, bronze medalist(s) | Silan Ayyildiz | Turkey | 4:09.79 | |
| 4 | Marta García | Spain | 4:10.87 | |
| 5 | Adèle Gay | France | 4:17.14 | |
| 6 | Ludovica Cavalli | Italy | 4:18.37 | |
| 7 | Ghania Rezzik | Algeria | 4:29.79 | |
| | Soukaina Hajji | Morocco | DNF | |

=== 5000 metres ===
30 August

| Rank | Name | Nationality | Time | Notes |
|---|---|---|---|---|
| 1st place, gold medalist(s) | Fatima Ezzahra Birdaha | Morocco | 15:07.40 | PB |
| 2nd place, silver medalist(s) | Micol Majori | Italy | 15:21.86 | |
| 3rd place, bronze medalist(s) | Silan Ayyildiz | Turkey | 15:23.08 | PB |
| 4 | Patrícia Silva | Portugal | 15:23.87 | |
| 5 | Federica Del Buono | Italy | 15:31.32 | |
| 6 | Javote Gueret | France | 16:08.27 | |
| | Lucie Paturel | France | DNF | |

=== 10,000 metres ===
31 August

| Rank | Name | Nationality | Time | Notes |
|---|---|---|---|---|
| 1st place, gold medalist(s) | Federica Del Buono | Italy | 35:02.28 | |
| 2nd place, silver medalist(s) | Mariana Machado | Portugal | 35:05.10 | |
| 3rd place, bronze medalist(s) | Kaoutar Farkoussi | Morocco | 35:13.57 | |
| 4 | Fatima Aafir | Morocco | 35:29.22 | |
| 5 | Derya Kunur | Turkey | 35:30.22 | |
| 6 | Aude Clavier | France | 35:40.87 | |
| 7 | Yonca Kutluk | Turkey | 35:43.71 | |
| 8 | Souad Aït Salem | Algeria | 35:55.40 | SB |
| 9 | Célia Tabet | France | 36:16.43 | |

=== 100 metres hurdles ===
Heats – 31 August
Wind:
Heat 1: -4.1 m/s, Heat 2: -4.0 m/s

| Rank | Heat | Name | Nationality | Time | Notes |
|---|---|---|---|---|---|
| 1 | 1 | Sacha Alessandrini | France | 13.17 | Q |
| 2 | 1 | Elena Carraro | Italy | 13.28 | Q |
| 3 | 2 | Celeste Polzonetti | Italy | 13.29 | Q |
| 4 | 2 | Nika Glojnarič | Slovenia | 13.49 | Q |
| 5 | 1 | Lerato Pagès | Spain | 13.54 | Q |
| 6 | 2 | Paula Blanquer | Spain | 13.58 | Q |
| 7 | 1 | Mia Wild | Croatia | 13.60 | q |
| 8 | 1 | Milica Emini | Serbia | 13.61 | q |
| 9 | 2 | Sofia Iosifidou | Greece | 13.67 | |
| 10 | 2 | Anja Lukić | Serbia | 13.72 | |
| 11 | 2 | Melissa Benfatah | France | 13.75 | |
| 11 | 1 | Malak Rashwan | Egypt | 13.75 | |
| 13 | 1 | Dafni Georgiou | Cyprus | 14.07 | |

Final – 31 August

Wind: -1.0 m/s

| Rank | Lane | Name | Nationality | Time | Notes |
|---|---|---|---|---|---|
| 1st place, gold medalist(s) | 3 | Celeste Polzonetti | Italy | 12.75 | GR |
| 2nd place, silver medalist(s) | 6 | Elena Carraro | Italy | 12.79 | SB |
| 3rd place, bronze medalist(s) | 4 | Sacha Alessandrini | France | 12.94 | |
| 4 | 7 | Paula Blanquer | Spain | 13.16 | |
| 5 | 2 | Lerato Pagès | Spain | 13.19 | |
| 6 | 1 | Mia Wild | Croatia | 13.42 | |
| 7 | 8 | Milica Emini | Serbia | 13.49 | |
| | 5 | Nika Glojnarič | Slovenia | DNF | |

=== 400 metres hurdles ===
Heats – 1 September

| Rank | Heat | Name | Nationality | Time | Notes |
|---|---|---|---|---|---|
| 1 | 2 | Ayomide Folorunso | Italy | 55.43 | Q |
| 2 | 2 | Méta Tumba | France | 55.99 | Q |
| 3 | 1 | Louise Maraval | France | 56.50 | Q |
| 4 | 1 | Alice Muraro | Italy | 57.10 | Q |
| 5 | 2 | Natalija Svenda | Croatia | 57.50 | Q |
| 6 | 1 | Agata Zupin | Slovenia | 58.56 | Q |
| 7 | 1 | Dimitra Gnafaki | Greece | 58.68 | Q |
| 8 | 1 | Marie-Charlotte Gastaud | Monaco | 59.25 | Q |
| 9 | 1 | Kalypso Stavrou | Cyprus | 59.43 | |
| 10 | 2 | Maša Garic | Bosnia and Herzegovina | 59.56 | |
| 11 | 2 | Duna Viñals | Andorra | 1:01.76 | |

Final – 2 September

| Rank | Lane | Name | Nationality | Time | Notes |
|---|---|---|---|---|---|
| 1st place, gold medalist(s) | 4 | Ayomide Folorunso | Italy | 54.22 | GR |
| 2nd place, silver medalist(s) | 7 | Louise Maraval | France | 54.68 | |
| 3rd place, bronze medalist(s) | 5 | Alice Muraro | Italy | 54.95 | |
| 4 | 6 | Méta Tumba | France | 55.90 | |
| 5 | 3 | Natalija Svenda | Croatia | 57.38 | |
| 6 | 2 | Dimitra Gnafaki | Greece | 58.35 | |
| 7 | 8 | Agata Zupin | Slovenia | 58.73 | |
| 8 | 1 | Marie-Charlotte Gastaud | Monaco | 1:00.27 | |

=== 3000 metres steeplechase ===
1 September

| Rank | Name | Nationality | Time | Notes |
|---|---|---|---|---|
| 1st place, gold medalist(s) | Marwa Bouzayani | Tunisia | 9:04.28 | GR |
| 2nd place, silver medalist(s) | Rihab Dhahri | Tunisia | 9:21.87 | SB |
| 3rd place, bronze medalist(s) | Clara Entresangle | France | 9:22.88 | |
| 4 | Tugba Yenigun | Turkey | 9:31.42 | SB |
| 5 | Derya Kunur | Turkey | 9:40.52 | |
| 6 | Ikram Ouaaziz | Morocco | 9:44.49 | |
| 7 | Milica Tomašević | Serbia | 9:58.59 | PB |
| 8 | Katia Delarche | France | 10:07.32 | |
| 9 | Gaia Colli | Italy | 10:26.32 | |

=== 4 × 100 metres relay ===
31 August

| Rank | Lane | Nation | Competitors | Time | Notes |
|---|---|---|---|---|---|
| 1st place, gold medalist(s) | 5 | Portugal | Rosalina Santos, Catarina Fonseca, Beatriz Castelhano, Arialis Gandulla | 43.57 | |
| 2nd place, silver medalist(s) | 7 | Greece | Sofia Iosifidou, Rafaéla Spanoudaki-Hatziriga, Dimitra Tsoukala, Polyniki Emmanouilidou | 43.61 | |
| 3rd place, bronze medalist(s) | 4 | Turkey | Büsra Akay, Sila Kologlu, Simay Özçiftçi, Elif Polat | 44.05 | |
| 4 | 3 | France | Naomily Oeslick, Grace Tade, Romane Colletin, Sacha Alessandrini | 44.69 | |
| | 6 | Italy | Alice Pagliarini, Alessia Pavese, Dalia Kaddari, Rachele Torchio | DNF | |

=== 4 × 400 metres relay ===
2 September

| Rank | Lane | Nation | Competitors | Time | Notes |
|---|---|---|---|---|---|
| 1st place, gold medalist(s) | 5 | Italy | Clarissa Vianelli, Sara Cirillo, Ginevra Ricci, Ilaria Accame | 3:29.89 | GR |
| 2nd place, silver medalist(s) | 7 | France | Marina Lasserre, Seynabou Camara, Noam Tanon, Méta Tumba | 3:32.24 | |
| 3rd place, bronze medalist(s) | 4 | Turkey | Simay Özçiftçi, Silan Ayyildiz, Elif Polat, Sila Kologlu | 3:40.99 | |
| | 3 | Morocco | Sara El Hachimi, Souad Elhaddad, Houda Nouiri, Salma Lehlali | DQ | |

=== Half marathon ===
3 September

| Rank | Name | Nationality | Time | Notes |
|---|---|---|---|---|
| 1st place, gold medalist(s) | Fatima Ezzahra Birdaha | Morocco | 1:09:59 | GR |
| 2nd place, silver medalist(s) | Klara Lukan | Slovenia | 1:11:22 | |
| 3rd place, bronze medalist(s) | Matea Parlov Koštro | Croatia | 1:11:58 | SB |
| 4 | Clémence Calvin | France | 1:12:11 | |
| 5 | Mariana Machado | Portugal | 1:12:19 | |
| 6 | Mélody Julien | France | 1:14:38 | |
| 7 | Fatima Aafir | Morocco | 1:15:01 | |
| 8 | Greta Settino | Italy | 1:15:13 | |
| 9 | Nursena Çeto | Turkey | 1:16:21 | |
| 10 | Ariadna Fenes | Andorra | 1:20:05 | |
| | Gresa Bakraçi | Kosovo | DNF | |
| | Kaoutar Farkoussi | Morocco | DNF | |
| | Heloise Laigle | France | DNF | |
| | Souad Aït Salem | Algeria | DNS | |

=== High jump ===
31 August

| Rank | Name | Nationality | 1.75 | 1.80 | 1.84 | 1.87 | 1.90 | 1.92 | 1.94 | 1.96 | 2.00 | Result | Notes |
|---|---|---|---|---|---|---|---|---|---|---|---|---|---|
| 1st place, gold medalist(s) | Marija Vuković | Montenegro | - | - | xo | o | o | o | o | xx- | x | 1.94 | |
| 2nd place, silver medalist(s) | Elena Kulichenko | Cyprus | - | o | o | o | o | xxo | x- | xx | | 1.92 | SB |
| 3rd place, bronze medalist(s) | Idea Pieroni | Italy | o | o | xo | xo | xxo | xx- | x | | | 1.90 | |
| 4 | Solène Gicquel | France | - | xo | o | o | xxx | | | | | 1.87 | |
| 5 | Una Stancev | Spain | o | o | o | xo | xxx | | | | | 1.87 | |
| 6 | Panagiota Dosi | Greece | o | xo | xo | xxo | xxx | | | | | 1.87 | SB |
| 7 | Lia Apostolovski | Slovenia | o | o | o | xxx | | | | | | 1.84 | |
| 8 | Styliana Ioannidou | Cyprus | o | xo | o | xxx | | | | | | 1.84 | |
| 9 | Marta Morara | Italy | o | xo | xxx | | | | | | | 1.80 | |
| 10 | Maelle Gauthier | France | xo | xxx | | | | | | | | 1.75 | |
| 11 | Jana Koščak | Croatia | xo | xxx | | | | | | | | 1.75 | |

=== Pole vault ===
30 August

| Rank | Name | Nationality | 4.05 | 4.20 | 4.35 | 4.45 | 4.55 | 4.60 | Result | Notes |
|---|---|---|---|---|---|---|---|---|---|---|
| 1st place, gold medalist(s) | Tina Šutej | Slovenia | - | xxo | o | o | o | xxo | 4.60 | |
| 2nd place, silver medalist(s) | Bérénice Petit | France | - | o | o | o | x- | xx | 4.45 | |
| 3rd place, bronze medalist(s) | Sonia Malavisi | Italy | o | xxo | o | xo | xxx | | 4.45 | |
| 4 | Nayah Cauvin | France | o | o | o | xxx | | | 4.35 | |
| 4 | Elisa Molinarolo | Italy | o | o | o | xxx | | | 4.35 | |
| 6 | Mónica Clemente | Spain | xo | o | o | xxx | | | 4.35 | |
| 7 | Ariadni Adamopoulou | Greece | xo | xxx | | | | | 4.05 | |

=== Long jump ===
31 August

| Rank | Name | Nationality | #1 | #2 | #3 | #4 | #5 | #6 | Result | Notes |
|---|---|---|---|---|---|---|---|---|---|---|
| 1st place, gold medalist(s) | Filippa Fotopoulou | Cyprus | 6.59 | x | 6.40 | 6.04 | 6.34 | 6.24 | 6.59 | |
| 2nd place, silver medalist(s) | Carmen Rosales | Spain | 6.32 | x | 6.33 | 6.50 | 6.29 | 6.20 | 6.50 | |
| 3rd place, bronze medalist(s) | Arianna Battistella | Italy | x | 6.02 | 6.45 | x | x | x | 6.45 | |
| 4 | Esraa Owis | Egypt | 6.10 | 6.22 | 6.01 | 6.35 | 6.00 | 5.94 | 6.35 | |
| 5 | Angelica Berriot | France | x | 6.13 | 6.34 | 6.18 | 6.14 | 6.16 | 6.34 | |
| 6 | Natalia Besi | Greece | 6.30 | 6.27 | 6.21 | x | 6.18 | 6.22 | 6.30 | |
| 7 | Greta Brugnolo | Italy | 6.26 | 6.05 | 5.97 | x | x | 5.83 | 6.26 | |
| 8 | Yasemin Zehra Börekçi | Turkey | 5.91 | x | 6.20 | 6.20 | x | 6.09 | 6.20 | |
| 9 | Vanessa Lokuli | France | 5.95 | 6.10 | 5.46 | | | | 6.10 | |
| 10 | Tugba Danismaz | Turkey | 5.96 | 5.83 | 5.90 | | | | 5.96 | |

=== Triple jump ===
1 September

| Rank | Name | Nationality | #1 | #2 | #3 | #4 | #5 | #6 | Result | Notes |
|---|---|---|---|---|---|---|---|---|---|---|
| 1st place, gold medalist(s) | Erika Saraceni | Italy | 14.21 | x | 13.85 | x | x | x | 14.21 | |
| 2nd place, silver medalist(s) | Ivana Španovic | Serbia | 14.07 | 14.02 | 14.09 | x | x | 13.96 | 14.09 | |
| 3rd place, bronze medalist(s) | Aleksandrija Mitrović | Serbia | x | x | 13.69 | 13.58 | 13.21 | 11.84 | 13.69 | |
| 4 | Clémence Rougier | France | 13.04 | 13.56 | 13.48 | 13.32 | 13.44 | 13.51 | 13.56 | |
| 5 | Tugba Danismaz | Turkey | 13.47 | x | x | 13.37 | 13.25 | 13.29 | 13.47 | |
| 6 | Greta Brugnolo | Italy | x | x | x | x | 12.60 | 12.95 | 12.95 | |
| 7 | Cerane Beal | France | x | x | 12.29 | 12.66 | – | – | 12.66 | PB |

=== Shot put ===
31 August

| Rank | Name | Nationality | #1 | #2 | #3 | #4 | #5 | #6 | Result | Notes |
|---|---|---|---|---|---|---|---|---|---|---|
| 1st place, gold medalist(s) | Auriol Dongmo | Portugal | x | 18.50 | 18.90 | 18.98 | 19.42 | 19.00 | 19.42 | |
| 2nd place, silver medalist(s) | Jessica Inchude | Portugal | 18.67 | 18.59 | 18.86 | 18.42 | 18.37 | 18.78 | 18.86 | |
| 3rd place, bronze medalist(s) | Sara Verteramo | Italy | 16.46 | 16.79 | x | x | 15.79 | x | 16.79 | |
| 4 | Anita Nalesso | France | 15.69 | 15.25 | 15.90 | 16.57 | x | 15.65 | 16.57 | |
| 5 | Naomie Wuta | France | 15.79 | 15.34 | x | x | 16.05 | 15.97 | 16.05 | PB |
| 6 | Maria Magkoulia | Greece | 15.22 | x | 15.33 | x | x | 15.37 | 15.37 | |

=== Discus throw ===
2 September

| Rank | Name | Nationality | #1 | #2 | #3 | #4 | #5 | #6 | Result | Notes |
|---|---|---|---|---|---|---|---|---|---|---|
| 1st place, gold medalist(s) | Irina Rodrigues | Portugal | 58.98 | 62.51 | 61.75 | 59.49 | x | x | 62.51 | |
| 2nd place, silver medalist(s) | Daisy Osakue | Italy | 60.96 | x | x | x | x | 58.81 | 60.96 | |
| 3rd place, bronze medalist(s) | Özlem Becerek | Turkey | 55.82 | 54.62 | 55.34 | 58.75 | 60.18 | 57.84 | 60.18 | |
| 4 | Marija Tolj | Croatia | 57.52 | 56.21 | x | 58.23 | 56.84 | x | 58.23 | |
| 5 | Jackie Hyman | France | 58.11 | x | x | 55.40 | x | 56.64 | 58.11 | |
| 6 | Chrysoula Anagnostopoulou | Greece | 53.01 | 55.78 | x | 56.06 | 56.59 | 56.11 | 56.59 | |
| 7 | Benedetta Benedetti | Italy | 54.88 | 54.50 | 55.59 | 55.10 | 50.11 | 54.22 | 55.59 | |
| 8 | Marina Hadjicosta | Cyprus | x | x | 52.10 | x | x | x | 52.10 | |
| 9 | Lea Zomenio | France | x | 48.17 | 45.34 | | | | 48.17 | |

=== Hammer throw ===
2 September

| Rank | Name | Nationality | #1 | #2 | #3 | #4 | #5 | #6 | Result | Notes |
|---|---|---|---|---|---|---|---|---|---|---|
| 1st place, gold medalist(s) | Sara Fantini | Italy | 69.49 | x | 73.03 | 72.01 | x | x | 73.03 | GR |
| 2nd place, silver medalist(s) | Laura Redondo | Spain | 61.82 | 67.82 | 65.72 | 65.52 | 65.23 | x | 67.82 | |
| 3rd place, bronze medalist(s) | Zahra Tatar | Algeria | 64.22 | 66.88 | 66.54 | x | x | 65.88 | 66.88 | |
| 4 | Stamatia Scarvelis | Greece | 66.27 | 64.94 | 64.95 | 64.63 | 65.51 | x | 66.27 | |
| 5 | Florella Freyche | France | 66.20 | x | x | 64.33 | x | 65.87 | 66.20 | |
| 6 | Yipsi Moreno | Albania | x | 65.35 | x | 65.99 | 62.18 | x | 65.99 | |
| 7 | Andrea Sales | Spain | 59.88 | 63.10 | x | x | 62.12 | 64.92 | 64.92 | |
| 8 | Rachele Mori | Italy | 60.67 | 60.94 | x | 61.23 | 60.99 | x | 61.23 | |
| 9 | Marie Rugetet | France | x | x | 60.54 | | | | 60.54 | |

=== Javelin throw ===
1 September

| Rank | Name | Nationality | #1 | #2 | #3 | #4 | #5 | #6 | Result | Notes |
|---|---|---|---|---|---|---|---|---|---|---|
| 1st place, gold medalist(s) | Adriana Vilagoš | Serbia | 58.83 | 61.26 | 60.88 | 61.64 | 58.56 | 65.93 | 65.93 | GR |
| 2nd place, silver medalist(s) | Yulenmis Aguilar | Spain | 54.07 | 65.39 | 55.76 | x | – | 59.56 | 65.39 | NR |
| 3rd place, bronze medalist(s) | Sara Kolak | Croatia | 54.38 | 62.64 | 60.78 | 59.96 | 61.14 | x | 62.64 | SB |
| 4 | Esra Türkmen | Turkey | 53.50 | 55.63 | 58.03 | 57.22 | 59.71 | 60.92 | 60.92 | |
| 5 | Alizée Minard | France | 59.66 | 59.76 | 58.56 | 57.12 | 57.65 | 56.33 | 59.76 | |
| 6 | Eda Tuğsuz | Turkey | 54.29 | 56.02 | 57.89 | 59.75 | 55.12 | 59.67 | 59.75 | SB |
| 7 | Jade Maraval | France | 54.43 | 58.39 | 59.29 | 56.13 | x | x | 59.29 | |
| 8 | Marija Vučenović | Serbia | x | 52.43 | 57.37 | x | x | x | 57.37 | |
| 9 | Adele Toniutto | Italy | 54.05 | 55.71 | 50.72 | | | | 55.71 | |
| 10 | Marija Bogavac | Montenegro | 52.03 | 49.64 | 48.68 | | | | 52.03 | |
| 11 | Paola Padovan | Italy | 50.60 | 50.54 | x | | | | 50.60 | |
| 12 | Christiana Ellina | Cyprus | 50.31 | 49.97 | x | | | | 50.31 | |
| 13 | Irenie Jane Theodorou | Cyprus | x | 47.05 | x | | | | 47.05 | |

== Mixed results ==
=== 4 × 100 metres relay ===
2 September

| Rank | Lane | Nation | Competitors | Time | Notes |
|---|---|---|---|---|---|
| 1st place, gold medalist(s) | 5 | Italy | Eric Marek, Dalia Kaddari, Filippo Cappelletti, Alice Pagliarini | 40.98 | |
| 2nd place, silver medalist(s) | 4 | France | Joryan Siger, Vanessa Lokuli, Hugo Jacquet-Dzong, Romane Colletin | 41.50 | |
| 3rd place, bronze medalist(s) | 6 | Greece | Vasilios Mirianthopoulos, Rafaéla Spanoudaki-Hatziriga, Sotirios Garaganis, Polyniki Emmanouilidou | 41.74 | |
| 4 | 7 | Turkey | Oguz Uyar, Simay Özçiftçi, Kayhan Özer, Elif Polat | 42.17 | |

=== 4 × 400 metres relay ===
30 August

| Rank | Lane | Nation | Competitors | Time | Notes |
|---|---|---|---|---|---|
| 1st place, gold medalist(s) | 5 | Turkey | Kubilay Encu, Simay Ozciftci, İsmail Nezir, Sila Kologlu | 3:14.85 | |
| 2nd place, silver medalist(s) | 6 | Italy | Federico Falsetti, Sara Cirillo, Riccardo Meli, Ilaria Elvira Accame | 3:14.89 | |
| 3rd place, bronze medalist(s) | 3 | France | Nel Martinez, Noam Tanon, Allan Lacroix, Seynabou Camara | 3:22.45 | |
| 4 | 4 | Greece | Spyridon-Ioannis Konidaris, Dimitra Gnafaki, Dimitris Levantinos, Anastasia Rapti | 3:23.65 | |
