= Stamatia Scarvelis =

Greek athlete

Personal information
- Nationality: Greek/American
- Born: 17 August 1995 (age 31) Santa Barbara, California, U.S.
- Height: 1.73 m (5 ft 8 in)
- Weight: 80 kg (176 lb)

Sport
- Country: Greece
- Sport: Athletics
- Events: Hammer throw Shot put Discus throw Weight throw

Achievements and titles
- Personal bests: 71.95 m (2025); 17.23 m (2018); 56.41 m (2018); 24.06 m (2019) NR

Stamatia Scarvelis (Greek: Σταματία Σκαρβέλη; born 17 August 1995) is an American-born Greek athlete. She competed in the semi-final of the hammer throw event at the 2019 World Athletics Championships in Doha, taking the 17th place.

Her personal best (71.95 m) ranks her second among all-time Greek female hammer throwers.

She is the younger sister of the shot putter Nicholas Scarvelis.

== Competition record ==
Year	Competition	Venue	Position	Event	Notes
Representing Greece
2016	European Championships	Amsterdam, Netherlands	26th (q)	Shot put	15.50 m
2017	U23 European Championships	Bydgoszcz, Poland	9th	Shot put	15.94 m
2018	European Championships	Berlin, Germany	15th (q)	Hammer throw	67.97 m
2019	World Championships	Doha, Qatar	17th (q)	Hammer throw	69.65 m
2021	Olympic Games	Tokyo, Japan	18th (q)	Hammer throw	69.01 m
2022	World Championships	Eugene, United States	26th (q)	Hammer throw	67.20 m
2022	European Championships	Munich, Germany	17th (q)	Hammer throw	67.13 m
2023	World Championships	Budapest, Hungary	26th (q)	Hammer throw	67.53 m
2024	European Championships	Rome, Italy	19th (q)	Hammer throw	67.10 m
2024	Olympic Games	Paris, France	17th (q)	Hammer throw	69.38 m
2025	Balkan Championships	Volos, Greece	1st	Hammer throw	71.95 m PB
2025	World Championships	Tokyo, Japan	16th (q)	Hammer throw	70.05 m
2026	European Championships	Birmingham, United Kingdom	7th	Hammer throw	69.54 m
2026	Mediterranean Games	Taranto, Italy	4th	Hammer throw	66.27 m
