= Sara Cirillo =

Italian sprinter (born 2004)

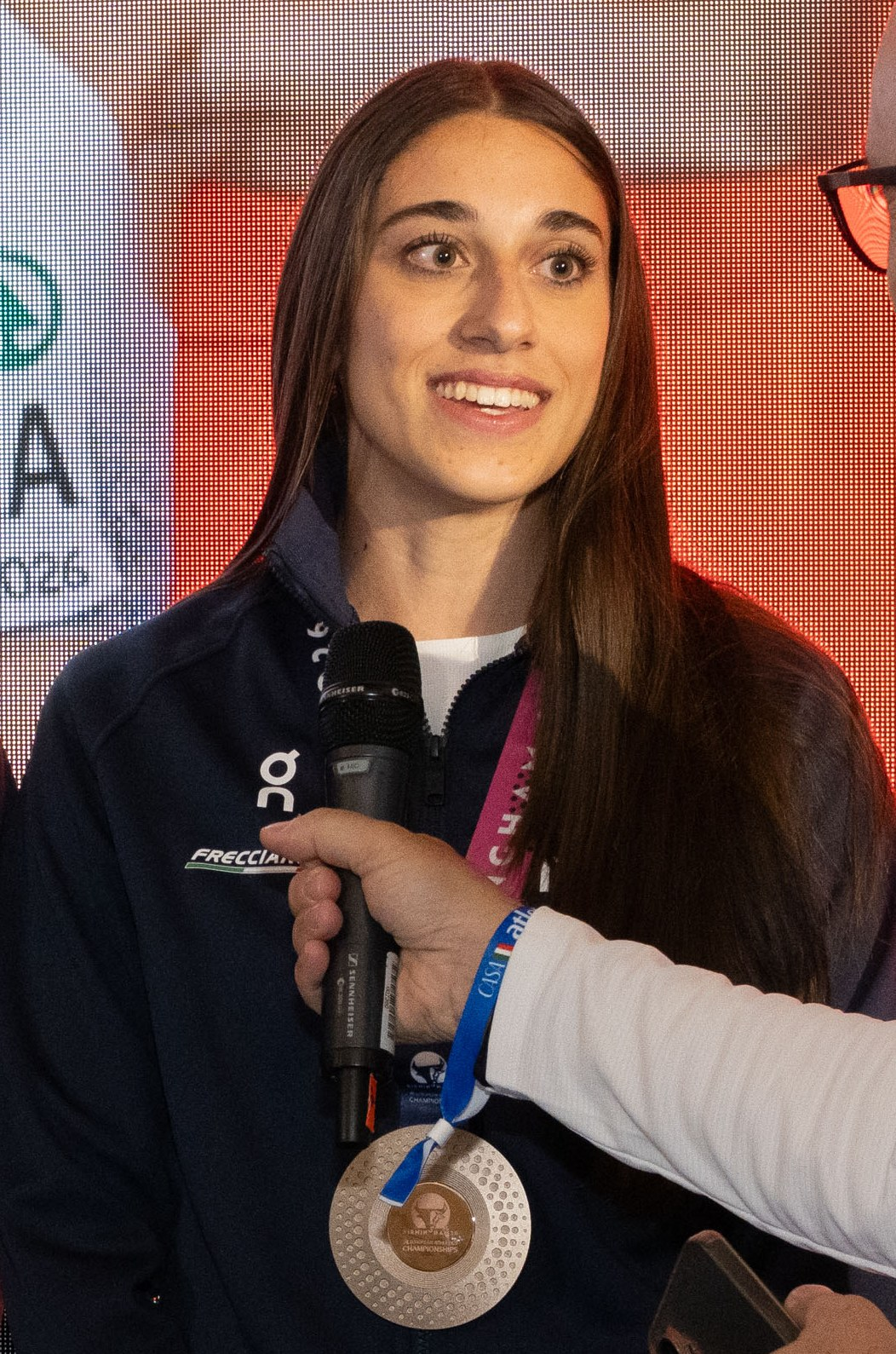
- Cirillo in 2026

Personal information
- National team: Italian Team
- Born: 12 April 2004 (age 22)

Sport
- Sport: Athletics
- Event: 400 m
Medal record
Women's athletics
Representing Italy
European Championships
Bronze medal – third place	2026 Birmingham	4 × 400 m relay
Mediterranean Games
Gold medal – first place	2026 Taranto	4 × 400 m relay
Silver medal – second place	2026 Taranto	4 × 400 m mixed relay

Sara Cirillo (born 12 April 2004) is an Italian sprinter. She won a bronze medal at the 2026 European Championships.

== Biography ==
From Ostia, Rome, Cirillo participated in swimming and artistic gymnastics before focusing on athletics, training at the Fiamme Gialle facilities in Castelporziano. She was initially coached by Claudio Licciardello and then by Luca Pasquale Porcelluzzi. In 2022, she achieved second place in her Italian age-group indoor championships over 400 metres. She later became a member of Acsi Futuratletica and coached by Marta Oliva from 2024 in Cecchignola.

In February 2025, she ran an outright lifetime best in placing third in 55.42 seconds in the 400 metres at the Italian Junior Championships. She won the 2026 Italian U23 indoor title in the 400 metres, before running a new indoor personal best of 53.25 seconds in qualifying for the final of the senior Italian Indoor Athletics Championships in Ancona in February 2026.

Cirillo was included in the Italian national team squad for the 2026 World Athletics Relays in Gaborone, Botswana in May 2026. At the Silver Gala in Rome in June 2026, Cirillo won the 400 m race with a time of 51.90 seconds to move to second on the Italian all-time under-23 list. In July, she improved that time to 51.86 seconds at the Italian U23 Championships in Molfetta, before placing fifth in the final of the 400 metres at the senior Italian Athletics Championships. She was a bronze medalist in August at the 2026 European Athletics Championships in Birmingham, England, running in the preliminary round of the women's 4 × 400 metres relay.
