= Fatima Birdaha =

Moroccan runner

Fatima Ezzahra Birdaha
Personal information
- Born: 1 March 2004 (age 22)

Sport
- Sport: Athletics
- Events: 5000 m Half Marathon

Achievements and titles
- Personal bests: Mile Road: 4:36.74 (2026); 1500 m : 4:16.01 (2026); 5000 m : 15:07.40 (2026); 10 km : 31:58 (2025); Half marathon : 1:07:33 (2026)NR
Medal record
Women's athletics
Representing Morocco
Mediterranean Games
Gold medal – first place	2026 Taranto	5000 m
Gold medal – first place	2026 Taranto	Half Marathon

Fatima Ezzahra Birdaha (born 1 March 2004) is a Moroccan middle-distance runner. Birdaha is the current national record holder in the Half marathon, which she broke in the 2026 World Athletics Road Running Championships.

== Career ==
Birdaha made her first professional appearance for Morocco in the 2026 Mediterranean Games, in which she managed to claim two gold medals, following her success in the 5000m and Half Marathon. In winning the 5000m race, Birdaha managed to set a new personal best of 15:07.40 to take the top spot. At the closing ceremony, Birdaha, along with Yassine Hssine, was selected to represent Morocco at the closing ceremony. In her first appearance at the World Athletics Half Marathon Championships in the 2026 Edition, Birdaha placed 9th out of 111 racers, breaking Morocco's national record in the half marathon.

== International competitions ==
Year	Competition	Venue	Position	Event	Notes
Representing Morocco
2026	Mediterranean Games	Taranto, Italy	1st	5000 m	15:07.40
2026	Mediterranean Games	Taranto, Italy	1st	Half Marathon	1:09:59
2026	World Athletics Half Marathon Championships	Copenhagen, Denmark	22nd	Road Mile	4:36.74
2026	World Athletics Half Marathon Championships	Copenhagen, Denmark	9th	Half Marathon	1:07:33
