= List of Moroccan records in athletics =

The following are the national records in athletics in Morocco maintained by Moroccan Royal Athletics Federation: Fédération Royale Marocaine d’Athlétisme (FRMA).

== Outdoor ==
Key to tables: Awaiting ratification Record not kept by FRMA Not ratified or later rescinded by FRMA

# = not ratified by FRMA or/and by IAAF

=== Men ===
Event	Record	Athlete	Date	Meet	Place	Ref.
100 m	10.02 (+2.0 m/s)	Yassine Hssine	4 July 2026	Moroccan Championships	Salé, Morocco	
200 m	19.92 (+0.4 m/s)	Yassine Hssine	14 July 2026	Gyulai István Memorial	Budapest, Hungary	
300 m	32.58	Benyounés Lahlou	20 July 1992		Narbonne, France	
400 m	45.03	Benyounes Lahlou	9 September 1992		Latakia, Syria	
600 m	1:15.84	Mostafa Smaili	12 May 2023	Meeting National	Toulon, France	
800 m	1:43.25	Amine Laalou	14 July 2006	Golden Gala	Rome, Italy	
1000 m	2:14.49	Moad Zahafi	9 August 2025	IFAM Oordegem	Oordegem, Belgium	
1500 m	3:26.00	Hicham El Guerrouj	14 July 1998	Golden Gala	Rome, Italy	
Mile	3:43.13	Hicham El Guerrouj	7 July 1999	Golden Gala	Rome, Italy	
Mile (road)	3:53.28	Anass Essayi	19 September 2026	World Road Running Championships	Copenhagen, Denmark	
2000 m	4:44.79	Hicham El Guerrouj	7 September 1999	ISTAF	Berlin, Germany	
3000 m	7:23.09	Hicham El Guerrouj	3 September 1999	Memorial Van Damme	Brussels, Belgium	
Two miles	8:10.98	Khalid Boulami	6 July 1996		Hechtel, Belgium	
5000 m	12:49.28	Brahim Lahlafi	25 August 2000	Memorial Van Damme	Brussels, Belgium	
5 km (road)	13:16	Hicham Amghar	9 December 2023	Annual Charity Run	Khobar, Saudi Arabia	
10,000 m	26:38.08	Salah Hissou	23 August 1996	Memorial Van Damme	Brussels, Belgium	
10 km (road)	27:09	Hicham Amghar	22 September 2024	tRUNsylvania International 10K Brasov	Brasov, Romania	
10 km (road)	26:56 (Note: unconfirmed distance, probably short course (9.87 km according to various GPS Measurements))	Hicham Amghar	7 April 2023	NAS Sports Tournament 10K	Dubai, United Arab Emirates	
15 km (road)	42:21+	Mohammed EL Youssfi	11 January 2026	Houston Half Marathon	Houston, United States	
10 miles (road)	45:24	Brahim Lahlafi	20 September 1998	Dam tot Damloop	Amsterdam-Zaandam, Netherlands	
20 km (road)	56:23+	Mohammed EL Youssfi	11 January 2026	Houston Half Marathon	Houston, United States	
Half marathon	59:21	Mohammed EL Youssfi	11 January 2026	Houston Half Marathon	Houston, United States	
One hour	20189 m	El Hassan El Ahmadi	1 July 1995		Noisy-le-Grand, France	
25 km (road)	1:13:42+	Othmane El Goumri	26 April 2026	Hamburg Marathon	Hamburg, Germany	
30 km (road)	1:28:35+	Othmane El Goumri	26 April 2026	Hamburg Marathon	Hamburg, Germany	
Marathon	2:04:24	Othmane El Goumri	26 April 2026	Hamburg Marathon	Hamburg, Germany	
110 m hurdles	13.63 (+1.5 m/s)	Mohamed Koussi	6 May 2018	French Club Championships	Franconville, France	
400 m hurdles	48.44	Saad Hinti	17 May 2025	Southeastern Conference Outdoor Track & Field Championships	Lexington, United States	
2000 m steeplechase	5:14.06	Soufiane El Bakkali	11 September 2022	Hanžeković Memorial	Zagreb, Croatia	
3000 m steeplechase	7:55.28	Brahim Boulami	24 August 2001	Memorial Van Damme	Brussels, Belgium	
3000 m steeplechase	7:53.17 X	Brahim Boulami	16 August 2002	Weltklasse Zürich	Zürich, Switzerland	
High jump	2.17 m	Mohamed Aghlal	14 July 1984		Rabat, Morocco	
Pole vault	5.45 m	Mohamed Karbib	12 June 2005		Rabat, Morocco	
Long jump	8.40 m (+1.0 m/s)	Yahya Berrabah	2 October 2009	Jeux de la Fracophonie	Beirut, Lebanon	
Triple jump	17.37 m (+2.0 m/s)	Tarik Bouguetaïb	14 July 2007		Khémisset, Morocco	
Shot put	20.45 m	Lahcen Sam-Sam Akka	6 May 1972		San Jose, United States	
Discus throw	59.37 m	Nabil Kiram	24 June 2007		Oujda, Morocco	
Hammer throw	70.73 m	Driss Barid	1 June 2013		Rabat, Morocco	
Javelin throw	76.45 m	Bilal Nouali	20 May 2017		Zaragoza, Spain	
Decathlon	7359 pts	Hakim Moulay Rachid Alaoui	7–8 July 2004		Meknes, Morocco	
Decathlon	100m (wind) / Long jump (wind) / Shot put / High jump / 400m / 110m H (wind) / Discus / Pole vault / Javelin / 1500m; 10.9 / 7.34 m / 10.92 m / 2.03 m / 51.2 / 14.6 / 39.45 m / 4.10 m / 53.80 m / 4:37.6					
5000 m walk (track)	19:56.13	Ali Daghiri	9 May 2015		Rabat, Morocco	
5 km walk (road)	19:35.8	Nacer Hasnaoui	17 February 1991		Rabat, Morocco	
10,000 m walk (track)	42:33.54	Ali Daghiri	26 April 2014		Tangier, Morocco	
10 km walk (road)	42:19	Ali Daghiri	9 June 2012		Casablanca, Morocco	
20 km walk (road)	1:28:24 (Note: ratified by FRMA but not recognised by World Athletics)	Ali Daghiri	31 May 2014		Casablanca, Morocco	
20 km walk (road)	1:30:08 (Note: recognised by World Athletics)	Allouch Othman	28 August 2019		Rabat, Morocco	
20 km walk (road)	1:29:52	Mohammed Loqmane	20 June 2023	Arab Championships	Marrakech, Morocco	
50 km walk (road)	4:57:29	Hassan Kouchaoui	21 April 1984		Albi, France	
4 × 100 m relay	39.61	Morocco; Mohamed Kandoussi; Mohamed Moudamane; Driss Bensaddou; Abdelkader Boukhari	7 September 1992		Latakia, Syria	
4 × 400 m relay	3:02.11	Morocco; Abdelali Kasbane; Ali Dahane; Bouchaib Belkaid; Benyounes Lahlou	31 August 1991	World Championships	Tokyo, Japan	
Distance medley relay	9:17.48	Mohammed Moustaoui 2:48.54 (1200m); Marouan Maadadi 46.36 (400m); Mohammed Laâlou 1:49.51 (800m); Amine Laâlou 3:53.09 (1600 m)	30 April 2011	Penn Relays	Philadelphia, United States	
Ekiden relay	1:57:56	Morocco / 5 km / 10 km / 5 km / 10 km / 5 km / 7.195 km	17 April 1994		Litochoro, Greece	

=== Women ===
Event	Record	Athlete	Date	Meet	Place	Ref.
100 m	11.45 (+0.1 m/s)	Assia Raziki	22 June 2016	African Championships	Durban, South Africa	
200 m	23.22 (−0.7 m/s)	Sara El Hachimi	4 August 2023	Jeux de la Francophonie	Kinshasa, Democratic Republic of the Congo	
200 m	23.0 h	Nezha Bidouane	6 August 2000		Rabat, Morocco	
300 m	37.42	Assia Raziki	30 June 2019	ABES Topmeeting	Edegem, Belgium	
400 m	51.67	Nezha Bidouane	1 September 1998	ISTAF	Berlin, Germany	
600 m	1:24.62	Assia Raziki	19 June 2022		Rabat, Morocco	
800 m	1:56.43	Hasna Benhassi	23 August 2004	Olympic Games	Athens, Greece	
1000 m	2:33.15	Hasna Benhassi	17 July 1999		Nice, France	
1500 m	3:58.84	Rababe Arafi	16 June 2019	Diamond League	Rabat, Morocco	
1500 m	3:58.35 (Note: Ratified as the national record by FRMA, but the time was 3:59.35 according to the official result source.)	Btissam Lakhouad	8 July 2010	Diamond League	Lausanne, Switzerland	
1500 m	3:56.15 X	Mariem Alaoui Selsouli	6 July 2012	Meeting Areva	Paris, France	
Mile	4:18.42	Rababe Arafi	12 July 2019	Diamond League	Fontvieille, Monaco	
Mile (road)	4:36.74 Wo	Fatima Birdaha	19 September 2026	World Road Running Championships	Copenhagen, Denmark	
2000 m	5:47.93	Siham Hilali	4 September 2009	Memorial Van Damme	Brussels, Belgium	
3000 m	8:26.48	Zahra Ouaziz	11 August 1999	Weltklasse Zürich	Zürich, Switzerland	
Two miles	9:38.44	Fatima Aouam	13 September 1987		Padua, Italy	
5000 m	14:32.08	Zahra Ouaziz	1 September 1998	ISTAF	Berlin, Germany	
5 km	15:06	Asmae Leghzaoui	15 September 2002		Providence, United States	
10,000 m	31:16.94	Asmae Leghzaoui	12 September 2001		Tunis, Tunisia	
10 km (road)	30:28.6	Asmae Leghzaoui	8 June 2002	New York Mini 10K	New York, United States	
15 km (road)	50:12	Fatiha Benchatki	16 April 2017		Bouznika, Morocco	
10 miles (road)	52:21	Asmae Leghzaoui	24 August 2002	Crim Festival of Races	Flint, United States	
20 km (road)	1:07:42	Rakiya Maraoui	15 October 1995		Paris, France	
Half marathon	1:07:33	Fatima Birdaha	20 September 2026	World Road Running Championships	Copenhagen, Denmark	
30 km (road)	1:40:11+	Majida Maayouf	4 December 2022	Valencia Marathon	Valencia, Spain	
Marathon	2:21:01	Majida Maayouf	4 December 2022	Valencia Marathon	Valencia, Spain	
100 m hurdles	13.55 NWI	Nezha Bidouane	12 August 1990		Maia, Portugal	
400 m hurdles	52.90	Nezha Bidouane	25 August 1999	World Championships	Seville, Spain	
2000 m steeplechase	6:20.23	Bouchra Chaâbi	1 June 2005	Grand Prix Regione Lombardia	Milan, Italy	
3000 m steeplechase	9:20.64	Salima El Ouali Alami	17 July 2015	Herculis	Fontvieille, Monaco	
High jump	1.80 m	Rhizlane Siba	30 March 2013		Warri, Nigeria	
High jump	1.80 m	Rhizlane Siba	5 May 2013		Reims, France	
High jump	1.80 m	Rhizlane Siba	19 May 2013		Villeneuve d'Ascq, France	
Pole vault	4.05 m	Nisrine Dinar	16 July 2006		Rabat, Morocco	
Long jump	6.55 m (+0.9 m/s)	Yousra Lajdoud	2 August 2023	Jeux de la Francophonie	Kinshasa, Democratic Republic of Congo	
Long jump	6.56 m NWI	Maria Saadi	5 September 2026	Arab U18 Championships	Cairo, Egypt	
Triple jump	13.76 m (Note: Ratified as the national record by FRMA, but according to World Athletics, this result was wind assisted (+2.1 m/s).)	Jamaa Chnaik	6 June 2010		Rabat, Morocco	
Triple jump	13.75 m (+2.0 m/s)	Jamaa Chnaik	1 July 2012	African Championships	Porto-Novo, Benin	
Shot put	16.60 m	Souad Maloussi	28 September 1985		Melbourne, Australia	
Discus throw	56.94 m	Zoubida Laayouni	20 March 1994		Meknès, Morocco	
Hammer throw	68.28 m	Soukaina Zakkour	2 August 2018	African Championships	Asaba, Nigeria	
Javelin throw	46.06 m	Rizlaine Amdaa	16 February 2013		Maisons-Laffitte, France	
Javelin throw	49.46 m	Rkia Ramoudi	11 July 1994		Bondoufle, France	
Heptathlon	5305 pts	Cherifa Meskaoui	6–7 August 1985		Casablanca, Morocco	
Heptathlon	100m H (wind) / High jump / Shot put / 200m (wind) / Long jump (wind) / Javelin / 800m; 14.28 / 1.55 m / 13.71 m / 25.58 / 5.42 m / 39.66 m / 2:26.25					
3 km walk (road)	14:47.5	Meriem Kouch	14 April 1993		Rabat, Morocco	
5 km walk (road)	24:29	Nazha Ezzhani	30 May 2010	Moroccan Race Walking Championships	Rabat, Morocco	
10 km walk (road)	50:32.8	Nazha Ezzhani	27 June 2009		Casablanca, Morocco	
20 km walk (road)	1:52:50	Nazha Ezzhani	2 April 2011		Algeria	
50 km walk (road)						
4 × 100 m relay	46.05	Nezha Bidouane; Hasna Ati Allah; Latifa Lahcen; Nadia Zetouani	11 July 1991	Mediterranean Games	Athens, Greece	
4 × 100 m relay	46.04	Morocco	23 June 2023	Arab Championships	Marrakech, Morocco	
4 × 400 m relay	3:33.89	Morocco; Salma Lehlali; Assia Raziki; Sara El Hachimi; Noura Ennadi	4 August 2023	Jeux de la Francophonie	Kinshasa, Democratic Republic of the Congo	

=== Mixed ===
Event	Record	Athlete	Date	Meet	Place	Ref.
4 × 400 m relay	3:19.44	Morocco; Rachid M'Hamdi; Houda Nouiri; Mohamed Zerhoum; Salma Lehlali	20 November 2025	Islamic Solidarity Games	Riyadh, Saudi Arabia	

== Indoor ==
=== Men ===
Event	Record	Athlete	Date	Meet	Place	Ref.
60 m	6.66	Yassine Hssine	31 January 2026	IFAM Gent	Ghent, Belgium	
200 m	21.19	Aziz Ouhadi	8 February 2011	Meeting Pas de Calais	Liévin, France	
300 m	32.46	Saad Hinti	10 January 2026	Clemson Invitational	Clemson, United States	
400 m	45.80 A	Houssam Hatib	1 February 2025	New Mexico Team Open	Albuquerque, United States	
500 m	1:02.25	Faouzi Lahbi	3 February 1985		Karlsruhe, West Germany	
800 m	1:45.76	Mahjoub Haida	9 March 1997	World Championships	Paris, France	
1000 m	2:17.17	Mahjoub Haida	25 February 1996		Stockholm, Sweden	
1500 m	3:31.18	Hicham El Guerrouj	2 February 1997	Sparkassen Cup	Stuttgart, Germany	
Mile	3:48.45	Hicham El Guerrouj	12 February 1997	Indoor Flanders Meeting	Ghent, Belgium	
2000 m	4:58.56	Adil Kaouch	5 February 1999		Budapest, Hungary	
3000 m	7:33.73+	Hicham El Guerrouj	23 February 2003	Meeting Pas de Calais	Liévin, France	
Two miles	8:06.61	Hicham El Guerrouj	23 February 2003	Meeting Pas de Calais	Liévin, France	
5000 m	13:10.60	Soufiane El Bakkali	18 February 2017	Birmingham Indoor Grand Prix	Birmingham, United Kingdom	
10,000 m	27:52.62	Abderrahim Goumri	10 February 2002	Indoor Flanders Meeting	Ghent, Belgium	
60 m hurdles	7.69	Mohamed Koussi	31 January 2018	Meeting National des Sacres	Reims, France	
400 m hurdles	52.82	Elamine Badr	6 February 2010	Meeting National	Val-de-Reuil, France	
High jump	2.00 m	Mohamed Aghlal	18 January 1985	World Indoor Games	Paris, France	
Pole vault	5.20 m	Taoufik Lacheeb	8 February 1992		Paris, France	
Long jump	8.02 m	Younés Moudrik	1 February 2002		Erfurt, Germany	
Long jump	8.02 m	Younés Moudrik	1 February 2002		Erfurt, Germany	
Long jump	8.02 m	Yahya Berrabah	13 February 2010	Reunión Internacional de Atletismo	Valencia, Spain	
Long jump	8.02 m	Younés Moudrik	2 February 2001		Erfurt, Germany	
Long jump	8.02 m	Younés Moudrik	14 March 2001		Madrid, Spain	
Triple jump	16.82 m	Tarek Bougtaib	24 February 2008	Indoor Flanders Meeting	Ghent, Belgium	
Shot put	18.14 m	Lahcen Samsam Akka	13 February 1971		Oakland, United States	
Heptathlon	5044 pts	Tarik Chakri	4–5 February 1995		Nogent-sur-Oise, France	
Heptathlon	60m / Long jump / Shot put / High jump / 60m H / Pole vault / 1000m; 7.44 / 6.19 m / 11.59 m / 1.92 m / 8.90 / 4.50 m / 2:42.80					
5000 m walk	26:52.18	Oussama Farah	25 January 2014		Bordeaux, France	
4 × 400 m relay						

=== Women ===
Event	Record	Athlete	Date	Meet	Place	Ref.
60 m	7.50	Salima Jamali	12 February 2011		Eaubonne, France	
200 m	24.19	Salima Jamali	6 February 2011		Aubière, France	
400 m	53.54	Nezha Bidouane	7 March 1997	World Championships	Paris, France	
800 m	1:59.01	Malika Akkaoui	14 February 2012	Meeting Pas de Calais	Liévin, France	
1000 m	2:36.01	Seltana Aït Hammou	20 February 2004	Norwich Union Indoor Grand Prix	Birmingham, United Kingdom	
1500 m	4:02.46	Rababe Arafi	8 February 2020	Copernicus Cup	Toruń, Poland	
Mile	4:29.74	Rababe Arafi	16 February 2019	Birmingham Indoor Grand Prix	Birmingham, United Kingdom	
2000 m	5:40.0+	Mariem Alaoui Selsouli	9 February 2008		Valencia, Spain	
3000 m	8:35.86	Mariem Alaoui Selsouli	9 February 2008	Reunión Internacional de Atletismo	Valencia, Spain	
5000 m	15:11.15	Zhara Ouaziz	31 January 2004	Sparkassen Cup	Stuttgart, Germany	
60 m hurdles	8.67	Sanae Zouine	1 February 2014		Valencia, Spain	
400 m hurdles	58.66	Haissat Lambarki	29 January 2012		Bordeaux, France	
High jump	1.75 m	Hind Bounouail	3 February 2001		Paris, France	
High jump	1.81 m	Rhizlane Siba	13 December 2014	Kansas State Winter Invitational	Manhattan, United States	
High jump	1.82 m	Rhizlane Siba	6 January 2018	Wildcat Invitational	Manhattan, United States	
Pole vault	3.17 m	Zakia El Hassouni	13 January 1996		Cercy-la-Tour, France	
Long jump	5.97 m	Fatima Zahra Dkouk	28 February 2004		Valladolid, Spain	
Triple jump	12.08 m	Aziza Amari	1992		France	
Shot put	13.03 m	Salima Ben Hamou	5 February 1989		Grenoble, France	
Pentathlon	3642 pts	Sanae Zouine	8 February 2014		Antequera, Spain	
Pentathlon	60m H / High jump / Shot put / Long jump / 800m; 8.78 / 1.53 m / 9.36 m / 5.88 m / 2:27.11					
3000 m walk	17:32.90	Rakia Chachoui	18 March 2008		Aubière, France	
4 × 400 m relay						
