= Sotirios Garaganis =

Greek sprinter (born 1999)

Personal information
- Born: 13 February 1999 (age 27) Athens, Greece
- Education: Physical Education and Sports Science, Athens

Sport
- Country: Greece
- Sport: Athletics
- Events: 60 m, 100m, 200m
- Club: OFKA Odysseas
- Coached by: Christos Katsikas

Achievements and titles
- Personal bests: 6.71 (2026); 10.23 (2025); 20.66 (2025), 20.90 [i] (2026)
Medal record
Representing Greece
Mediterranean Games
Bronze medal – third place	2026 Taranto	4 x 100 m relay mixed
Men's para-athletics
Paralympic Games
Gold medal – first place	2020 Tokyo	100 m T11
Para Athletics European Championships
Gold medal – first place	2021 Bydgoszcz	100 m T11

Sotirios Garaganis (Greek: Σωτήριος Γκαραγκάνης; born 13 February 1999) is a Greek sprinter competing mostly in the events of 100 metres and 200 metres. He represented Greece at the 2018 IAAF World U20 Championships, as a member of the 4 × 100 m relay team.

== International competitions ==
Year	Competition	Venue	Position	Event	Notes
Representing Greece
2024	European Championships	Rome, Italy	21st (sf)	200 m	20.93 s
2024	European Championships	Rome, Italy	7th	4 × 100 m relay	39.39 s
2025	European Indoor Championships	Apeldoorn, Netherlands	34th (h)	60 m	6.77 s
2025	Balkan Championships	Volos, Greece	1st	4 × 100 m relay	39.03 s
2026	European Championships	Birmingham, United Kingdom	20th (h)	200 m	21.23 s
2026	European Championships	Birmingham, United Kingdom	6th	4 × 100 m relay	39.21 s
2026	Mediterranean Games	Taranto, Italy	7th	100 m	10.60 s
2026	Mediterranean Games	Taranto, Italy	4th	4 × 100 m relay	39.42 s
2026	Mediterranean Games	Taranto, Italy	3rd	4 × 100 m relay mixed	41.74 s NR

== Para-athletics ==
Garaganis represented Greece at the 2020 Summer Paralympics, as a guide for Athanasios Ghavelas, in the 100 metres T11 event. They won the gold medal with a world record time of 10.82.
