= Rafaéla Spanoudaki-Hatziriga =

Greek sprinter

Rafailia Spanoudaki
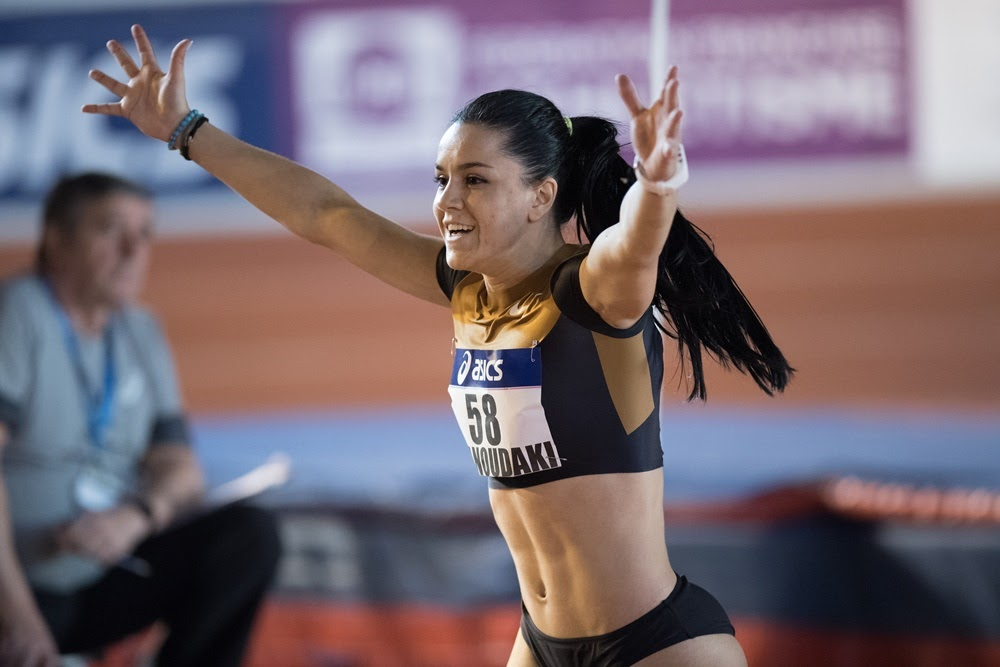

Personal information
- Nationality: Greek
- Born: 7 June 1994 (age 32) Rhodes, Greece
- Height: 1.66 m (5 ft 5 in)
- Weight: 59 kg (130 lb)

Sport
- Sport: Athletics
- Events: 60m, 100m, 200m
- Club: GS Ilioupoli

Achievements and titles
- Personal bests: 60 m: 7.23 (2021); 100m: 11.26 (2025); 200m: 23.04 (2025)
Medal record
Women's athletics
Representing Greece
European Games
Bronze medal – third place	2019 Minsk	100 m
Mediterranean Games
Silver medal – second place	2018 Tarragona	100 m
Silver medal – second place	2026 Taranto	200 m
Silver medal – second place	2026 Taranto	4 x 100 m relay
Bronze medal – third place	2026 Taranto	4 x 100 m relay mixed

Rafailia Spanoudaki-Hatziriga (Greek: Ραφαέλα Σπανουδάκη–Χατζηρήγα; born 7 June 1994), is a Greek sprinter. She competed in the 60 metres event at the 2018 and 2022 World Athletics Indoor Championships, and the 100 metres and 200 metres at the 2020 Summer Olympics.

== Competition record ==
Year	Competition	Venue	Position	Event	Notes
Representing Greece
2017	European Indoor Championships	Belgrade, Serbia	–	60 m	DQ
2018	World Indoor Championships	Birmingham, United Kingdom	35th (h)	60 m	7.40 s
2018	Mediterranean Games	Tarragona, Spain	2nd	100 m	11.53 s
2018	European Championships	Berlin, Germany	16th (h)	100 m	11.63 s
2018	European Championships	Berlin, Germany	14th (h)	4 × 100 m relay	44.48 s
2019	European Indoor Championships	Glasgow, United Kingdom	–	60 m	DQ
2019	World Championships	Doha, Qatar	34th (h)	200 m	23.48 s
2021	European Indoor Championships	Toruń, Poland	11th (sf)	60 m	7.29 s
2021	Olympic Games	Tokyo, Japan	35th (h)	100 m	11.45 s
2021	Olympic Games	Tokyo, Japan	23rd (sf)	200 m	23.38 s
2022	World Indoor Championships	Belgrade, Serbia	32nd (h)	60 m	7.35 s
2022	European Championships	Munich, Germany	19th (h)	100 m	11.62 s
2022	European Championships	Munich, Germany	13th (h)	4 × 100 m relay	44.58 s
2023	European Indoor Championships	Istanbul, Turkey	29th (h)	60 m	7.43 s
2024	European Championships	Rome, Italy	15th (h)	4 × 100 m relay	44.23 s
2025	European Indoor Championships	Apeldoorn, Netherlands	36th (h)	60 m	7.41 s
2025	Balkan Championships	Volos, Greece	1st	100 m	11.31 s
2025	Balkan Championships	Volos, Greece	1st	4 × 100 m relay	43.77 s
2026	World Indoor Championships	Toruń, Poland	36th (h)	60 m	7.36 s
2026	European Championships	Birmingham, United Kingdom	17th (h)	100 m	11.42 s
2026	European Championships	Birmingham, United Kingdom	21st (sf)	200 m	23.45 s
2026	European Championships	Birmingham, United Kingdom	–	4 × 100 m relay	DNF
2026	Mediterranean Games	Taranto, Italy	2nd	200 m	23.07 s
2026	Mediterranean Games	Taranto, Italy	2nd	4 × 100 m relay	43.61 s
2026	Mediterranean Games	Taranto, Italy	3rd	4 × 100 m relay mixed	41.74 NR
