= Théo Schaub =

French sprinter (born 2000)

Personal information
- Born: 15 November 2000 (age 25) Mulhouse, France
- Height: 180 cm (5 ft 11 in)
- Weight: 72 kg (159 lb)

Sport
- Country: France
- Sport: Athletics
- Event: Sprint

Achievements and titles
- Personal bests: 60m: 6.77 (Nantes, 2025); 100m: 10.33 (Thonon-les-Bains, 2025); 200m: 20.57 (Taranto, 2026)
Medal record
Men's athletics
Representing France
Mediterranean Games
| Bronze medal – third place | 2026 Taranto | 200 m |

Théo Schaub (born 15 November 2000) is a French sprinter. He was French indoor national champion over 200 metres in 2024, and competed for France at the 2025 World Athletics Championships.

== Biography ==
He is from Illzach in Alsace, but later based himself in Nice, France. He won the 200 metres at the French Indoor Athletics Championships in Miramas in 2024.

He competed for France over 200 metres at the European Team Championships First Division in Madrid, Spain in June 2025. He finished second over 200 metres and fourth over 100 metres at the French Athletics Championships in August 2025.

In September 2025, he competed in the men's 4 x 100 metres at the 2025 World Championships in Tokyo, Japan, as the French team placed seventh.

In May 2026, he ran in the French team at the 2026 World Athletics Relays in the mixed 4 × 100 metres relay. He also ran in the men's 4 × 100 metres relay at the championships in Gaborone, Botswana.
