= Alice Muraro =

Italian hurdler (born 2000)

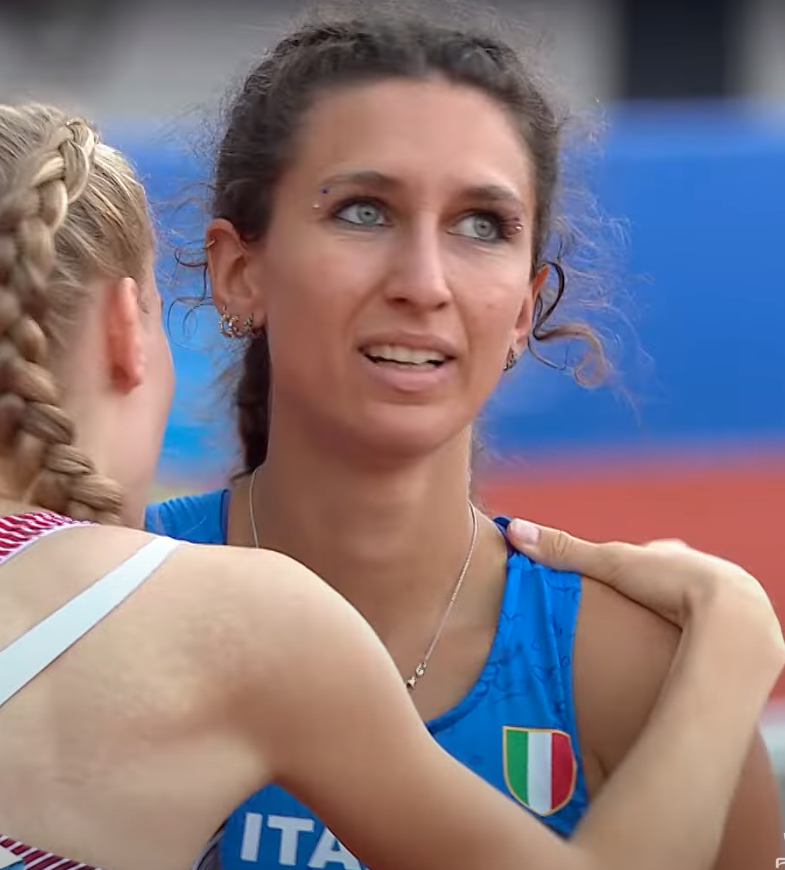
- Muraro in 2023

Personal information
- National team: Italy
- Born: 14 August 2000 (age 26) Vicenza, Italy
- Height: 1.72 m (5 ft 8 in)
- Weight: 56 kg (123 lb)

Sport
- Sport: Athletics
- Event: Hurdling
- Club: Atletica Vicentina

Achievements and titles
- Personal best: 400 m hs: 54.73 (2024)
Medal record
Summer Universiade
Gold medal – first place	2021 Chengdu	400 m hs
Gold medal – first place	2025 Bochum	400 m hs
Mediterranean Games
Bronze medal – third place	2026 Taranto	400 m hurdles

Alice Muraro (born 14 August 2000) is an Italian hurdler gold medal at the 2021 Summer World University Games in the 400 m hs.

== Biography ==
Born in Bressanvido, Muraro comes from an athletic family: her father, Lorenzo, was a 400 metres hurdler and serves as her coach, while her mother, Anna Beggio, was a 400 metres sprinter, and her younger sister, Mariasole, has also represented Italy at youth level. After initially practicing rhythmic gymnastics, she took up athletics, competing in combined events and sprint hurdles before focusing primarily on the 400 metres hurdles in 2021.

She won the gold medal in the 400 m hurdles at the 2023 Summer World University Games in Chengdu with a time of 55.48 seconds, successfully defending her title at the 2025 Games in Rhine-Ruhr. Later that year, she set a personal best of 54.36 seconds in the heats of the World Athletics Championships in Tokyo, becoming the second-fastest Italian woman in history in the event.

She holds a bachelor's degree in economics from the Free University of Bozen-Bolzano and a master's degree in business management and strategy from the University of Verona.

== Career ==
Muraro in 2021 reached the semifinal on the 400 m hs at the 2021 European Athletics U23 Championships. She is among the Italian national athletics team's squad members for the 2026 Mediterranean Games.

== Achievements ==
Year	Competition	Venue	Rank	Event	Time	Notes
2023	World University Games	(China) Chengdu	1st	400 m hs	55.48	PB
2024	European Championships	(Italy) Rome	9th	400 m hs	54.73	PB
2026	European Championships	(United Kingdom) Birmingham	SF	400 m hs	56.19	

== National titles ==
Muraro won two national championships at individual senior level.

- Italian Athletics Championships
  - 400 metres hurdles: 2024, 2025
