= 2025 Balkan Athletics Championships =

- Dates: 26–27 July
- Host city: Volos, Greece
- Venue: Panthessaliko Stadium
- Level: Senior
- Events: 43

The 2025 Balkan Athletics Championships was the 80th edition of the annual track and field competition for athletes from the Balkans, organised by Balkan Athletics. It was held at the Panthessaliko Stadium on 26 and 27 July in Volos, Greece.

== Medal summary ==
=== Men ===
Event	Gold		Silver		Bronze	
100 metres (wind: +1.4 m/s)	Jernej Gumilar (SLO)	10.23	Oleksandr Sokolov (UKR)	10.28	Hristo Iliev (BUL)	10.29
200 metres	Alham Naghiyev (AZE)	20.70	Gal Arad (ISR)	20.80	Deniz Kaan Kartal (TUR)	20.84
400 metres	Oleksandr Pohorilko (UKR)	45.10	Rok Ferlan (SLO)	45.26	Mihai Sorin Dringo (ROM)	45.29
800 metres	Marino Bloudek (CRO)	1:45.55	Ömer Faruk Bozdağ (TUR)	1:46.89	Amel Tuka (BIH)	1:47.00
1500 metres	Salih Teksöz (TUR)	3:41.97	Nino Jambrešić (CRO)	3:42.64	Haralambos Lagos (GRE)	3:43.40
3000 metres	Abdurrahman Gediklioğlu (TUR)	8:11.38	Ivo Balabanov (BUL)	8:11.79	Yervand Mkrtchyan (ARM)	8:13.12
5000 metres	Elzan Bibić (SRB)	14:03.83	Ivo Balabanov (BUL)	14:15.83	Maxim Răileanu (MDA)	14:17.00
110 metres hurdles	Dmytro Bahinskiy (UKR)	13.64	Filip Jakob Demšar (SLO)	13.73	Milan Trajkovic (CYP)	13.75
400 metres hurdles	Niklas Strohmayer-Dangl (AUT)	49.87	Omri Shiff (ISR)	50.22	Mitja Zubin (SLO)	50.67
3000 metres Steeplechase	Abdullah Tuğluk (TUR)	8:37.84	Ersin Tekal (TUR)	8:45.94	Muchie Zemenu (ISR)	8:47.93
4 × 100 metres relay	Greece; Lampros Volikas; Nikolaos Panagiotopoulos; Sotirios Gkaragkanis; Vasileos Myrianthopoulos	39.03	Turkey; Ertan Özkan; Kayhan Özer; Batuhan Altıntaş; Ramil Guliyev	39.05	Ukraine; Oleksandr Sosnovenko; Dmytro Kravets; Dmytro Yanchyk; Illia Popov	39.63
4 × 400 metres relay	Ukraine; Mykyta Rodchenkov; Mykyta Barabanov; Danylo Danylenko; Oleksandr Pohorilko	3:07.00	Slovenia; Marko Pepelnak; Lovro Mesec Košir; Mitja Zubin; Rok Ferlan	3:07.01	Greece; Ioannis Simoni; Vladimiros Andreadis; Petros Kechiopoulos; George John Franks	3:07.48
High jump	Tihomir Ivanov (BUL)	2.19	Antonios Merlos (GRE); Vladyslav Lavskyy (UKR)	2.15	Not awarded	
Pole vault	Emmanouil Karalis (GRE)	5.92 CR	Ioannis Rizos (GRE)	5.65	Vladyslav Malykhin (UKR)	5.55
Long jump	Miltiadis Tentoglou (GRE)	8.07	Bozhidar Sarâboyukov (BUL)	7.90	Andreas Trajkovski (MKD)	7.77
Triple jump	Razvan Cristian Grecu (ROM)	16.46	Nikolaos Andrikopoulos (GRE)	16.21	Grigoris Nikolaou (CYP)	16.05
Shot put	Andrei Toader (ROM)	20.74	Armin Sinančević (SRB)	20.70	Giorgi Mujaridze (GEO)	20.11
Discus Throw	Alin Firfirica (ROM)	63.15	Dimitrios Pavlidis (GRE)	60.82	Omer Şahin (TUR)	59.67
Hammer Throw	Özkan Baltacı (TUR)	75.72	Matija Gregurić (CRO)	75.45	Halil Yilmazer (TUR)	75.01
Javelin Throw	Dimitrios Tsitsos (GRE)	78.30	Anze Durjava (SLO)	78.12	Filip Dominković (SLO)	76.28
Decathlon	Angelos-Tzanis Andreoglou (GRE)	7125	Aris-Nikolaos Peristeris (GRE)	6887	Krum Zakhariev (BUL)	6347

=== Women ===
Event	Gold		Silver		Bronze	
100 metres (wind: +1.6 m/s)	Rafailia Spanoudaki-Hatziriga (GRE)	11.31	Magdalena Lindner (AUT)	11.42	Lucija Potnik (SLO)	11.44
200 metres	Polyniki Emmanouilidou (GRE)	23.01	Olivia Fotopoulou (CYP)	23.06	Dimitra Tsoukala (GRE)	23.16
400 metres	Veronika Drljačić (CRO)	51.22	Andrea Miklos (ROM)	51.53	Karolina Zbičajnik (SLO)	53.24
800 metres	Dilek Koçak (TUR)	2:01.73	Georgia-Maria Despollari (GRE)	2:02.35	Nina Vuković (CRO)	2:02.53
1500 metres	Dilek Koçak (TUR)	4:09.85	Anthi Kyryakopoulou (GRE)	4:11.03	Karawan Halabi Kablan (ISR)	4:13.80
3000 metres	Melissa Anastasakis (GRE)	9:17.72	Gresa Bakraqi (KOS)	9:17.80	Gamze Bulut (TUR)	9:22.43
5000 metres	Gamze Bulut (TUR)	16:22.19	Denisa Balla (GRE)	16:37.84	Gresa Bakraqi (KOS)	16:50.24
100 metres hurdles (wind: -0.2 m/s)	Karin Strametz (AUT)	13.00	Nika Glojnarič (SLO)	13.17	Militsa Emini (SRB)	13.22
400 metres hurdles	Laoura Zenegia (GRE)	57.02	Elimpiona Zenegia (GRE)	57.91	Maja Gajić (SRB)	58.17
3000 metres steeplechase	Adva Cohen (ISR)	9:48.52	Tuğba Güvenç Yenigün (TUR)	9:49.63	Karawan Halabi Kablan (ISR)	9:54.60
4 × 100 metres relay	Greece; Sofia Kamperidou; Rafailia Spanoudaki-Hatziriga; Dimitra Tsoukala; Polyniki Emmanouilidou	43.77	Serbia; Militsa Emini; Marija Bukvić; Tamara Milutinović; Milana Tirnanić	45.01	Slovenia; Nika Jenko; Lina Hribar; Lana Andolšek; Lucija Potnik	45.29
4 × 400 metres relay	Slovenia; Ajda Kaučič; Uršula Černelč; Maja Pogorevc; Karolina Zbičajnik	3:36.93	Greece; Andriana Ferra; Ekaterini Grigoriadou; Despina Mourta; Laoura Zenegia	3:31.36	Only two starting teams	
High jump	Angelina Topić (SRB)	1.93	Marija Vuković (MNE)	1.91	Yuliya Chumachenko (UKR)	1.87
Pole vault	Maryna Kylypko (UKR)	4.25	Demet Parlak (TUR); Evgenia Maria Panagiotou (GRE); Ariadni Adamamopoulou (GRE)	4.15	Not awarded	
Long jump	Alina Rotaru-Kottmann (ROM)	6.81	Filippa Fotopoulou (CYP)	6.65	Ramona Elena Verman (ROM)	6.63
Triple jump	Ivana Španović (SRB)	14.12	Elena Andreea Taloș (ROU)	14.10	Oxana Koreneva (GRE)	14.00
Shot put	Olha Holodna (UKR)	16.51	Maria Rafailidou (GRE)	16.28	Emel Dereli (TUR)	16.17
Discus Throw	Alexandra Emilianov (MDA)	60.96	Marija Tolj (CRO)	59.64	Özlem Becerek (TUR)	56.99
Hammer Throw	Stamatia Scarvelis (GRE)	71.95	Bianca Florentina Ghelber (ROM)	70.20	Valentina Savva (CYP)	69.21
Javelin Throw	Elina Tzengko (GRE)	62.83 CR	Marija Vučenović (SRB)	59.09	Marija Bogavac (MNE)	52.49
Heptathlon	Anastasia Dragomirova (GRE)	6163	Stella Tzikanoula (GRE)	5238	Anđela Drobnjak (MNE)	4693

=== Mixed ===
Event	Gold		Silver		Bronze	
4 × 400 metres relay	Turkey; Deniz Kaan Kartal (M); Elif Polat (W); Oǧuzhan Kaya (M); Gülşah Cebeci̇ (W)	3:24.66	Greece; Ioannis Simoni (M); Ekaterini Grigoriadou (W); Petros Papagiannis (M); Elimpiona Zenegia (W)	3:24.86	Ukraine; Oleksandr Molodyka (M); Natalia Pyrozhenko-Chornomaz (W); Rostyslav Holubovych (M); Nataliya Besidovska (W)	3:25.28

== Medal table ==
* Host nation (Greece)

Rank	Nation	Gold	Silver	Bronze	Total
1	Greece*	13	15	4	32
2	Turkey	8	5	6	19
3	Ukraine	5	2	4	11
4	Romania	4	3	2	9
5	Serbia	3	3	2	8
6	Slovenia	2	5	5	12
7	Croatia	2	3	1	6
8	Austria	2	1	0	3
9	Bulgaria	1	3	2	6
10	Israel	1	2	3	6
11	Moldova	1	0	1	2
12	Azerbaijan	1	0	0	1
13	Cyprus	0	2	3	5
14	Montenegro	0	1	2	3
15	Kosovo	0	1	1	2
16	Armenia	0	0	1	1
16	Bosnia and Herzegovina	0	0	1	1
16	Georgia	0	0	1	1
16	North Macedonia	0	0	1	1
Totals (19 entries)		43	46	40	129
