= Eric Marek =

Italian sprinter (born 2003)

Personal information
- Born: 21 February 2003 (age 23)

Sport
- Sport: Athletics
- Event: Sprint
Medal record
Men's athletics
Representing Italy
European U23 Championships
Gold medal – first place	2023 Espoo	4x100m relay
Mediterranean Games
Gold medal – first place	2026 Taranto	Mixed 4x100m
Silver medal – second place	2026 Taranto	100 m

Eric Marek (born 21 February 2003) is an Italian sprinter.

== Biography ==
From Bergamo, and a member of Atletica Bergamo 1959 and the Italian Army, Marek competed in American football before focusing on athletics. He won the 60 meters title at the Italian Under 23 Indoor Championships in 2023. Competing outdoors he had a win the 100 meters at the Italian age-group Championships in Agropoli with a time of 10.28 seconds. Marek won a gold medal later that year at the 2023 European Athletics U23 Championships in Espoo, Finland, while competing in the men’s 4 x 100 metres relay.

Competing at the 2026 European Athletics Championships in Birmingham, England, he ran as part of the Italy men's 4 x 100 metres relay team as Italy won their heat to qualify for the final, and also ran for Italy in the final. Competing at the 2026 Mediterranean Gamss in Taranto, he won the silver medal over 100 metres and the gold medal in the mixed 4 x 100 metres relay.
