= Alexia Ioana Dospin =

Romanian athlete (born 2003)

Personal information
- Born: 4 July 2003 (age 22)

Sport
- Sport: Athletics
- Event: Triple jump

Achievements and titles
- Personal best(s): Triple jump: 14.05 m (Bergen, 2025)
Medal record
Women's athletics
Representing Romania
European U23 Championships
Gold medal – first place	2025 Bergen	Triple jump

Alexia Ioana Dospin (born 4 July 2003) is a Romanian triple jumper. She won the 2025 European Athletics U23 Championships.

== Biography ==
She is a member of CSM Constanța, where she is coached by Carmen Botea. She placed seventh in the final of the World Athletics U20 Championships in Nairobi, Kenya.

In February 2025, she jumped a personal best 13.75 metres to win the junior category and finish runner-up in the senior Romanian Indoor Athletics Championships behind Diana Ana Maria Ion.

In July 2025, she won the U23 Romanian title in Craiova, with a best jump of 13.68 metres. She won the gold medal at the 2025 European Athletics U23 Championships in Bergen, Norway, with a personal best jump of 14.05 metres. She had also previously jumped a personal best of 13.89m in the second round. She had qualified for the final with the sixth best jump of 13.74 metres. It was the first Romanian gold medal at the Championships since 2017, in Bydgoszcz, Poland, where Elena Panțuroiu also won the triple jump title.

In March 2026, she placed thirteenth at the 2026 World Athletics Indoor Championships in Toruń, Poland.
