= Yassine Hssine =

Moroccan sprinter

Personal information
- Born: 31 January 2003 (age 23)

Sport
- Sport: Athletics
- Event: Sprint

Achievements and titles
- Personal bests: 60m: 6.66 (2026) NR; 100m: 10.02 NR(2026); 200m: 19.92 (2026) NR
Medal record
Men's athletics
Representing Morocco
Mediterranean Games
| Gold medal – first place | 2026 Taranto | 100 m |
| Gold medal – first place | 2026 Taranto | 200 m |

Yassine Hssine (born 31 January 2003) is a Moroccan sprinter and national record holder over 60, 100 metres & 200 metres.

== Biography ==
Hssine won the Moroccan athletics championships over 100 metres in July 2025. He set a new Moroccan national record of 6.66 seconds for the 60 metres in Gent, Belgium in January 2026. The following month, he ran 6.68 seconds at the Cosma Indoor Cup in Lithuania.

In April 2026, he ran a new personal best for the 100 metres in Fes. On 31 May 2026, he ran a national record 20.18 seconds for the 200 metres at the 2026 Meeting International Mohammed VI d'Athlétisme de Rabat. On 19 June, Hssine ran a new Moroccan Record of 20.10s (+1.7) over 200 metres at the Meeting Ciudad de Malaga, in Spain. Later that month, he lowered it again to 20.00 seconds placing second to Andre de Grasse at the Boris Hanzekovic Memorial in Zagreb, a World Athletics Continental Tour Gold meeting, on 26 June. He lowered the national record to 19.97 seconds at the 2026 Moroccan Championships in July. On 14 July, he broke the Moroccan national record for the fifth time in the season with 19.92 seconds to win the István Gyulai Memorial, in Budapest. In September, he competed over 200 m at the inaugural World Ultimate Championship in Budapest.
