= Clémence Rougier =

French athlete (born 2005)

Personal information
- Nationality: French
- Born: 27 March 2005 (age 21) Lagos, Nigeria
- Height: 180 cm (5 ft 11 in)
- Weight: 64 kg (141 lb)

Sport
- Country: France
- Sport: Athletics
- Event: Triple jump
- Club: Limoges Athlé
- Coached by: Jean-Christophe Sautour

Achievements and titles
- Personal bests: Triple jump: 13.84 m (Limoges, 2024)
Medal record
Women's athletics
Representing France
European U23 Championships
Silver medal – second place	2025 Bergen	Triple jump
European U18 Championships
Gold medal – first place	2022 Jerusalem	Triple jump

Clémence Rougier (born 27 March 2005) is a French triple jumper. She won the triple jump title at the 2026 French Indoor Athletics Championships. She won a silver medal at the 2025 European Athletics U23 Championships, having previously won the gold medal at the 2022 European Athletics U18 Championships.

== Career ==
Born in Lagos, Nigeria, Rougier was trained by Jean-Christophe Sautour in the triple jump at Limoges Athlé. She won French junior triple jump titles in 2021 and 2022. In July 2022, she won the 2022 European Athletics U18 Championships in Jerusalem, Israel with a personal best and French junior record of 13.72 metres. She was selected for the 2022 World Athletics U20 Championships in Cali, Colombia, however was unable to compete after testing positive for COVID-19. Later that year, she was nominated by the European Athletics Association (EAA) Awards in the Women's Rising Star category.

Competing at the French Indoor Athletics Championships in Aubière in February 2023, she placed second behind Ilionis Guillaume with a best jump of 13.24 metres. The following week, she won the French U20 title in Lyon with a jump of 13.33 metres. That July, she also won the French junior outdoor triple jump title in Châteauroux.

Rougier finished as runner-up to Guillaume at the French Indoor Championships in February 2024 in Miramas. In June 2024, she increased her personal best to 13.84 metres whilst competing in Limoges. She was selected for the 2024 World Athletics U20 Championships in Lima, Peru, placing eighth overall with best jump of 13.11 metres.

Rougier was runner-up to Guillaume once again at the senior French Indoor Championships in February 2025 in Miramas. She won the silver medal representing France in the triple jump at the 2025 European Athletics U23 Championships in Bergen, Norway with a wind-assisted 13.93 metres (+2.1 m/s).

Rougier won the triple jump title at the 2026 French Indoor Athletics Championships in Aubiere, with 13.56 metres.
