= 2025 European Athletics Team Championships =

Athletics tournament in Madrid, Spain

2025 European Team Championships
- Host city: Madrid, Spain (First division); Maribor, Slovenia (Second & third division)
- Events: 37
- Dates: 26–29 June 2025 (First division); 28–29 June 2025 (Second division); 24–25 June 2025 (Third division)
- Website: 1st Division; 2nd & 3rd Division

The 2025 European Athletics Team Championships (ETC) were held in Maribor, Slovenia through 24 June to 29 June and at the Estadio de Vallehermoso in Madrid, Spain, from 26 to 29 June 2025.

The 2023 edition was initially planned to be held in Madrid, but after European Athletics and the European Olympic Committee reached an agreement, the event was added to the 2023 European Games programme and moved to Poland. Madrid was subsequently awarded the 2025 edition.

As in 2023, Russia and Belarus will be banned from participating due to the ongoing Russian invasion of Ukraine.

== Overall results ==
Games	Gold	Silver	Bronze
First Division	Italy	Poland	Germany

Games	First	Second	Third
Second Division	Belgium	Slovenia	Norway
Third Division	Iceland	Luxembourg	Bosnia and Herzegovina

First Division

Final standings:

Rank	Nation	Points	EW
1	Italy	431.5	3
2	Poland	405.5	2
3	Germany	397	3
4	Netherlands	384.5	8
5	Great Britain	381	2
6	Spain	378	2
7	France	354.5	3
8	Portugal	304	2
9	Sweden	288.5	1
10	Switzerland	286	2
11	Czech Republic	283	3
12	Greece	253	2
13	Hungary	244.5	1
14	Ukraine	231	2
15	Finland	220.5	1
16	Lithuania	178.5	0

Second Division

Final standings:

Rank	Nation	Points	EW
1	Belgium	451.5	9
2	Slovenia	402.5	3
3	Norway	400	7
4	Turkey	382	3
5	Ireland	349	1
6	Denmark	335	0
7	Austria	318	4
8	Croatia	308.5	2
9	Slovakia	304.5	3
10	Romania	285	1
11	Estonia	266.5	0
12	Israel	258.5	3
13	Serbia	253	1
14	Cyprus	245.5	0
15	Bulgaria	240.5	0
16	Latvia	212	0

Third Division

Final standings:

Rank	Nation	Points	EW
1	Iceland	461.5	8
2	Luxembourg	410	5
3	Bosnia and Herzegovina	383	3
4	Moldova	371	3
5	Malta	333.5	3
6	Azerbaijan	315.5	4
7	Georgia	307	2
8	North Macedonia	270.5	2
9	Montenegro	268	2
10	Armenia	264	0
11	Andorra	229.5	2
12	Albania	223	2
13	San Marino	207.5	1
14	Kosovo	154	0
15	Liechtenstein	107	0

: European Athletics Team Champion : silver medalist : bronze medalist
: Divisional winner and promoted : promoted : relegated

== First Division ==
=== Participating countries ===
- Czech Republic
- Finland
- France
- Germany
- Great Britain
- Greece
- Hungary
- Italy
- Lithuania
- Netherlands
- Poland
- Portugal
- Spain
- Sweden
- Switzerland
- Ukraine

=== Results ===
Men

Event	First		Second		Third	
100 m	Eugene Amo-Dadzie; Great Britain	10.07	Elvis Afrifa; Netherlands	10.10	Oliwer Wdowik; Poland	10.10
200 m	Xavi Mo-Ajok; Netherlands	20.01 CR	Eseosa Fostine Desalu; Italy	20.18	Toby Harries; Great Britain	20.25
400 m	Samuel Reardon; Great Britain	44.60 CR	Oleksandr Pohorilko; Ukraine	44.81 NR	Patrik Simon Enyingi; Hungary	44.84 =NR
800 m	Mohamed Attaoui; Spain	1:44.01 CR	Francesco Pernici; Italy	1:44.39	Corentin Magnou; France	1:45.06
1500 m	Isaac Nader; Portugal	3:39.08 CR	Stefan Nillessen; Netherlands	3:39.97	Filip Rak; Poland	3:40.14
5000 m	Niels Laros; Netherlands	13:44.45	Dominic Lobalu; Switzerland	13:45.37	Thierry Ndikumwenayo; Spain	13:45.38
3000 m steeplechase	Karl Bebendorf; Germany	8:20.43 CR	Daniel Arce; Spain	8:22.04	Nicolas-Marie Daru; France	8:22.39
110 m hurdles	Jason Joseph; Switzerland	13.24	Lorenzo Simonelli; Italy	13.27	Tade Ojora; Great Britain	13.36
400 m hurdles	Vit Müller; Czech Republic	48.46	Alastair Chalmers; Great Britain	48.64	Julien Bonvin; Switzerland	48.66
4 × 100 m	Netherlands (NED); Nsikak Ekpo; Taymir Burnet; Xavi Mo-Ajok; Elvis Afrifa	37.87 CR, NR	Germany (GER); Kevin Kranz; Marvin Schulte; Julian Wagner; Lucas Ansah-Peprah	38.27	Great Britain (GBR); Romell Glave; Adam Gemili; Jona Efoloko; Eugene Amo-Dadzie	38.33
High jump	Jan Štefela; Czech Republic	2.33	Matteo Sioli; Italy	2.27	Tobias Potye; Germany	2.24
Pole vault	Menno Vloon; Netherlands	5.80	Piotr Lisek; Poland	5.70	Matěj Ščerba; Czech Republic	5.70
Long jump	Miltiadis Tentoglou; Greece	8.46 CR	Thobias Montler; Sweden	8.08	Mattia Furlani; Italy	8.07
Triple jump	Jonathan Seremes; France	17.00	Simone Biasutti; Italy	16.94	Vladyslav Shepeliev; Ukraine	16.83
Shot put	Leonardo Fabbri; Italy	21.68	Wictor Petersson; Sweden	21.10	Konrad Bukowiecki; Poland	20.55
Discus throw	Daniel Ståhl; Sweden	68.36	Mika Sosna; Germany	66.17	Lawrence Okoye; Great Britain	65.83
Hammer throw	Mykhaylo Kokhan; Ukraine	81.66	Merlin Hummel; Germany	81.27	Bence Halász; Hungary	80.63
Javelin throw	Julian Weber; Germany	85.15	Artur Felfner; Ukraine	80.54	Edis Matusevicius; Lithuania	78.26

Mixed

Event	First		Second		Third	
4 × 400 m	Poland (POL); Maksymilian Szwed; Justyna Święty-Ersetic; Daniel Sołtysiak; Natalia Bukowiecka	3:09.43 CR, NR	Italy (ITA); Edoardo Scotti; Virginia Troiani; Vladimir Aceti; Alice Mangione	3:09.66 NR	Great Britain (GBR); Samuel Reardon; Lina Nielsen; Toby Harries; Emily Newnham	3:09.66

Women

Event	First		Second		Third	
100 m	Boglárka Takács; Hungary	11.06 CR, NR	Ewa Swoboda; Poland	11.13	Minke Bisschops; Netherlands	11.17
200 m	Jaël Bestué; Spain	22.19 CR, NR	Helene Parisot; France	22.42	Sophia Junk; Germany	22.53
400 m	Femke Bol; Netherlands	49.48 CR	Natalia Bukowiecka; Poland	50.14	Paula Sevilla; Spain	50.70
800 m	Anaïs Bourgoin; France	1:58.60 CR	Audrey Werro; Switzerland	1:58.78	Eloisa Coiro; Italy	1:59.88
1500 m	Agathe Guillemot; France	4:08.72	Salomé Afonso; Portugal	4:09.01	Revee Walcott-Nolan; Great Britain	4:09.16
5000 m	Nadia Battocletti; Italy	15:56.01	Marta García; Spain	15:58.53	Diane van Es; Netherlands	15:59.41
3000 m steeplechase	Ilona Mononen; Finland	9:49.21	Sarah Tait; Great Britain	9:49.24	Kinga Królik; Poland	9:49.80
100 m hurdles	Ditaji Kambundji; Switzerland	12.39 w	Nadine Visser; Netherlands	12.39 w	Pia Skrzyszowska; Poland	12.60 w
400 m hurdles	Fatoumata Binta Diallo; Portugal	54.77	Ayomide Folorunso; Italy	54.88	Lina Nielsen; Great Britain	54.90
4 × 100 m	Netherlands (NED); Nadine Visser; Lieke Klaver; Minke Bisschops; Marije van Hunenstijn	42.02 CR, NR	Spain (ESP); Esperança Cladera; Jaël Bestué; Paula Sevilla; Maria Isabel Pérez	42.11 NR	Germany (GER); Lisa Marie Kwayie; Sina Mayer; Sophia Junk; Lisa Mayer	42.52
High jump	Yaroslava Mahuchikh; Ukraine	2.00	Maria Żodzik; Poland	1.97	Imke Onnen; Germany	1.94
Pole vault	Amálie Švábíková; Czech Republic	4.65	Maryna Kylypko; Ukraine	4.65	Angelica Moser; Switzerland	4.55
Long jump	Larissa Iapichino; Italy	6.92	Malaika Mihambo; Germany	6.84	Agate de Sousa; Portugal	6.84
Triple jump	Carolina Joyeux; Germany	14.42	Maja Åskag; Sweden	14.18	Erika Giorgia Anoeta Saraceni; Italy	14.08
Shot put	Jessica Schilder; Netherlands	20.14 CR	Yemisi Ogunleye; Germany	19.58	Fanny Roos; Sweden	19.38
Discus throw	Jorinde van Klinken; Netherlands	64.61	Shanice Craft; Germany	61.53	Liliana Cá; Portugal	60.49
Hammer throw	Anita Wlodarczyk; Poland	73.34	Silja Kosonen; Finland	73.09	Anna Purchase; Great Britain	71.41
Javelin throw	Elina Tzengko; Greece	62.23	Maria Andrejczyk; Poland	60.42	Liveta Jasiunaite; Lithuania	58.88

=== Score table ===
Event		CZE	FIN	FRA	GER	GBR	GRE	HUN	ITA	LTU	NED	POL	POR	ESP	SWE	SUI	UKR
100 metres	M	2	3	9.5	12	16	8	11	1	4	15	14	9.5	7	13	6	5
100 metres	W	4	1	5	11	6	10	16	12	3	14	15	13	7	8	9	2
200 metres	M	11	5	8	9	14	3	4	15	7	16	13	12	10	2	6	1
200 metres	W	3	1	15	14	7	6	11	10	4	13	5	12	16	9	8	2
400 metres	M	5	3	10	1	16	8	14	13	2	12	11	4	6	9	7	15
400 metres	W	9	11	8	10	12	1	3	13	4	16	15	5	14	6	7	2
800 metres	M	13	5	14	11	7	2	1	15	4	10	9	6	16	8	12	3
800 metres	W	6	5	16	10	11	8	1	14	13	2	12	9	7	4	15	3
1500 metres	M	11	7	9	12	8	1	4	10	2	15	14	16	13	5	3	6
1500 metres	W	4	3	16	6	14	5	1	11	12	8	13	15	10	7	9	2
5000 metres	M	7	4	11	13	9	1	5	12	2	16	10	3	14	8	15	6
5000 metres	W	8	7	6	11	12	10	1	16	2	14	9	3	15	13	4	5
3000 metre steeplechase	M	8	4	14	16	11	3	10	9	1	7	12	6	15	13	5	2
3000 metre steeplechase	W	1	16	12	6	15	8	7	4	3	10	14	11	13	5	9	2
110 metre hurdles 100 metre hurdles	M	3	8	11	10	14	6	2	15	1	9	12	5	13	4	16	7
110 metre hurdles 100 metre hurdles	W	8	11	10	5	1	7	12	13	4	15	14	6	9	3	16	2
400 metre hurdles	M	16	10	6	11	15	3	7	13	2	0	4	9	12	8	14	5
400 metre hurdles	W	4	10	6	13	14	3	11	15	1	7	8	16	2	9	12	5
4 × 100 metres relay	M	11	7	0	15	14	9	6	13	3	16	5	8	12	4	10	0
4 × 100 metres relay	W	5	3	11	14	9	8	7	13	1	16	12	6	15	4	10	2
4 × 400 metres relay	X	3	7	12	10	14	5	9	15	4	11	16	0	13	8	0	6
High jump	M	16	4.5	7.5	14	10	12.5	6	15	7.5	1	9	4.5	11	3	2	12.5
High jump	W	12.5	4	8	14	1	10	5	12.5	7	11	15	2	9	6	3	16
Pole vault	M	13.5	11.5	9	0	8	0	13.5	7	3.5	16	15	5	10	3.5	6	11.5
Pole vault	W	16	4.5	4.5	2	12	10.5	9	13	4.5	10.5	4.5	0	7	8	14	15
Long jump	M	9	7	12	11	6	16	3	14	2	0	13	4	8	15	10	5
Long jump	W	3	2	12	15	11	4	7	16	5	10	8	14	9	6	13	1
Triple jump	M	5	9	16	1	6	7	12	15	4	10	8	11	13	2	3	14
Triple jump	W	11	0	12	16	7	13	4	14	9	5	10	8	3	15	2	6
Shot put	M	7	1	8	10	13	5	3	16	2	9	14	11	4	15	6	12
Shot put	W	5	9	4	15	10	3	6	2	1	16	7	13	12	14	11	8
Discus throw	M	4	2	9	15	14	8	0	5	12	11	10	6	13	16	3	7
Discus throw	W	8	5	13	15	3	9	4	6	11	16	12	14	7	10	1	2
Hammer throw	M	12	3	13	15	4	6	14	11	2	9	0	10	5	8	7	16
Hammer throw	W	3	15	4	12	14	11	8	13	1	6	16	9	10	7	2	5
Javelin throw	M	6	9	2	16	10	7	3	8	14	4	12	13	11	1	5	15
Javelin throw	W	10	3	11	6	13	16	4	12	14	8	15	1	7	9	5	2
Country		CZE	FIN	FRA	GER	GBR	GRE	HUN	ITA	LTU	NED	POL	POR	ESP	SWE	SUI	UKR
Total		283	220.5	354.5	397	381	253	244.5	431.5	178.5	384.5	405.5	300	220.5	288.5	283	231

== Second Division ==
=== Participating nations ===
- Austria
- Belgium
- Bulgaria
- Croatia
- Cyprus
- Denmark
- Estonia
- Ireland
- Israel
- Latvia
- Norway
- Romania
- Serbia
- Slovakia
- Slovenia
- Turkey

=== Results ===
Men

Event	First		Second		Third	
100 m	Per Tinius Fremstad-Waldron; Norway	10.46	Simon Hansen; Denmark	10.55	Oskars Grava; Latvia	10.56
200 m	Blessing Afrifah; Israel	20.31	Simon Verherstraeten; Belgium	20.61	Oskars Grava; Latvia	20.65
400 m	Alexander Doom; Belgium	44.66 CR	Rok Ferlan; Slovenia	44.70 NR	Mihai Sorin Dringo; Romania	44.74 NR
800 m	Marino Bloudek; Croatia	1:46.22	Pieter Sisk; Belgium	1:46.29	Cian McPhillips; Ireland	1:46.37
1500 m	Ruben Verheyden; Belgium	3:42.58	Håkon Moe Berg; Norway	3:42.76	Shane Bracken; Ireland	3:42.92
5000 m	Isaac Kimeli; Belgium	13:55.70	Brian Fay; Ireland	13:56.07	Joel Ibler Lillesø; Denmark	13:58.64
3000 m steeplechase	Abdullah Tuğluk; Turkey	8:45.14	Tim van de Velde; Belgium	8:47.74	Zemenu Muchie; Israel	8:48.01
110 m hurdles	Enzo Diessl; Austria	13.31	Jakob Filip Demšar; Slovenia	13.47	Mikdat Sevler; Turkey	13.61
400 m hurdles	Patrik Dömötör; Slovakia	49.61	Mimoun Abdoul Wahab; Belgium	50.23	Niklas Strohmayer-Dangl; Austria	50.75
4 × 100 m	Norway (NOR); Per Tinius Fremstad-Waldron; Jacob Vaula; Mathias Hove Johansen; Andreas Ofstad Kulseng	38.86 NR	Ireland (IRL); Michael Farrelly; Sean Aigboboh; Marcus Lawler; Israel Olatunde	38.88 NR	Slovenia (SLO); Jernej Gumilar; Matevž Šuštaršič; Andrej Skočir; Jurij Beber	39.12 NR
High jump	Jonathan Kapitolnik; Israel	2.25	Jef Vermeieren; Belgium	2.19	Valentin Alexandru Androne; Romania	2.19
Pole vault	Ben Broeders; Belgium	5.70	Ersu Şaşma; Turkey	5.50	Robert Kompus; Estonia	5.50
Long jump	Matúš Blšták; Slovakia	7.79	Hans-Christian Hausenberg; Estonia	7.78	Henrik Flåtnes; Norway	7.74
Triple jump	Endiorass Kingley; Austria	16.85 NR	Can Özüpek; Turkey	16.25	Lâchezar Vâlchev; Bulgaria	16.11
Shot put	Marcus Thomsen; Norway	21.02	Armin Sinančević; Serbia	20.54	Andrei Rares Toader; Romania	20.30
Discus throw	Kristjan Čeh; Slovenia	68.16	Lukas Weißhaidinger; Austria	64.88	Alin Firfirică; Romania	63.81
Hammer throw	Thomas Mardal; Norway	76.85	Özkan Baltaci; Turkey	74.58	Adam Kelly; Estonia	73.66
Javelin throw	Daniel Thrana; Norway	80.24	Arthur W. Petersen; Denmark	79.01	Alexandru Novac; Romania	78.73

Mixed

Event	First		Second		Third	
4 × 400 m	Norway (NOR); Andreas Ofstad Kulseng; Amalie Iuel; Håvard Bentdal Ingvaldsen; Henriette Jæger	3:13.64	Slovakia (SVK); Patrik Dömötör; Daniela Ledecká; Matej Baluch; Emma Zapletalová	3:14.05	Romania (ROM); Mihai Sorin Dringo; Alexandra Stefania Ută; Mario Alexandru Dobrescu; Andrea Miklós	3:14.71

Women

Event	First		Second		Third	
100 m	Delphine Nkansa; Belgium	11.42	Lucija Potnik; Slovenia	11.57	Viktória Forster; Slovakia	11.60
200 m	Imke Vervaet; Belgium	22.85	Olivia Fotopoulou; Cyprus	22.90	Line Kloster; Norway	23.17
400 m	Emma Zapletalová; Slovakia	50.76 NR	Imke Vervaet; Belgium	50.86	Sharlene Mawdsley; Ireland	50.93
800 m	Caroline Bredlinger; Austria	1:58.95	Anita Horvat; Slovenia	1:59.78	Pernille Karlsen Antonsen; Norway	2:01:01
1500 m	Şilan Ayyıldız; Turkey	4:17.02	Elise Vanderelst; Belgium	4:17.48	Ingeborg Østgård; Norway	4:20.18
5000 m	Klara Lukan; Slovenia	15:09.56	Jana van Lent; Belgium	15:37.51	Carina Reicht; Austria	15:53.27
3000 m steeplechase	Adva Cohen; Israel	9:32.43	Eline Dalemans; Belgium	9:33.04	Juliane Hvid; Denmark	9:39.26
100 m hurdles	Sarah Lavin; Ireland	12.82	Viktória Forster; Slovakia	12.86	Yanla Ndjip-Nyemeck; Belgium	12.89
400 m hurdles	Naomi Van Den Broeck; Belgium	55.33	Amalie Iuel; Norway	55.51	Daniela Ledecká; Slovakia	56.23
4 × 100 m	Belgium (BEL); Janie de Naeyer; Lotte van Lent; Lien Torfs; Delphine Nkansa	43.46	Denmark (DEN); Ida Beiter Bomme; Klara Skriver Loessl; Celina Hagihara; Amaya Kruse Jørgensen	43.94	Ireland (IRL); Sarah Leahy; Ciara Neville; Lauren Roy; Sarah Lavin	43.97
High jump	Merel Maes; Belgium	1.93	Angelina Topić; Serbia	1.93	Elena Kulichenko; Cyprus	1.89
Pole vault	Tina Šutej; Slovenia	4.70	Elien Vekemans; Belgium	4.65	Lene Onsrud Retzius; Norway	4.50
Long jump	Milica Gardašević; Serbia	6.75	Ida Andrea Breigan; Norway	6.60	Plamena Mitkova; Bulgaria	6.43
Triple jump	Elena Andreea Taloș; Romania	14.18	Ivana Španović; Serbia	14.15	Tuğba Danışmaz; Turkey	14.00
Shot put	Emel Dereli; Turkey	16.23	Estel Valeanu; Israel	16.09	Elena Defrère; Belgium	15.80
Discus throw	Sandra Elkasević; Croatia	62.87	Lisa Brix Pedersen; Denmark	58.88	Özlem Becerek; Turkey	56.59
Hammer throw	Beatrice Nedberge Llano; Norway	71.14	Bianca Ghelber; Romania	70.62	Nicola Tuthill; Ireland	70.50
Javelin throw	Victoria Hudson; Austria	67.76	Sigrid Borge; Norway	65.66	Adriana Vilagoš; Serbia	62.75

=== Score table ===
After 37/37 events
Event		AUT	BEL	BUL	CRO	CYP	DEN	EST	IRL	ISR	LAT	NOR	ROU	SRB	SVK	SLO	TUR
100 metres	M	11	6	2	8	7	15	0	9	13	14	16	10	4	3	12	5
100 metres	W	11	16	10	1	9	7	13	8	4	5	12	2	3	14	15	6
200 metres	M	3	15	6	7	4	5	8	11	16	14	13	1	2	12	10	9
200 metres	W	5	16	9	6	15	8	13	12	4	2	14	3	7	1	10	11
400 metres	M	4	16	0	7	6	12	2	13	3	8	10	14	5	9	15	11
400 metres	W	6	15	8	12	10	7	3	14	5	2	1	13	4	16	11	9
800 metres	M	4	15	5	16	1	6	12	14	8	3	11	10	2	7	13	9
800 metres	W	16	2	10	9	12	13	4	1	5	3	14	7	6	8	15	11
1500 metres	M	8	16	10	9	2	5	12	14	7	4	15	6	3	1	11	13
1500 metres	W	10	15	7	9	2	8	1	13	11	5	14	6	4	3	12	16
5000 metres	M	8	16	3	5	0	14	4	15	11	6	13	2	12	9	7	10
5000 metres	W	14	15	8	7	2	6	1	11	13	10	9	3	5	4	16	12
3000 metre steeplechase	M	3	15	6	11	4	9	10	13	14	12	0	5	2	7	8	16
3000 metre steeplechase	W	10	15	2	4	5	14	11	13	16	6	–	8	7	3	9	12
110 metre hurdles 100 metre hurdles	M	16	3	12	11	13	10	8	0	7	0	5	4	6	9	15	14
110 metre hurdles 100 metre hurdles	W	13	14	1	10	5	12	8	16	6	2	3	9	7	15	11	4
400 metre hurdles	M	14	15	5	6	3	12	8	2	10	4	7	11	9	16	13	0
400 metre hurdles	W	11	16	2	13	6	8	9	3	7	1	15	12	10	14	4	5
4 × 100 metres relay	M	9	12	10	–	5	13	4	15	8	7	16	3	6	2	14	11
4 × 100 metres relay	W	11	16	5	7	9	15	13	14	4	–	2	3	6	8	12	10
4 × 400 metres relay	X	10	11	8	7	2	6	3	13	4	1	16	14	5	15	12	9
High jump	M	9	15	13	1	10	6	3	12	16	5	11	14	7	2	4	8
High jump	W	2	16	7	12	14	6	9	3	1	5	10	4	15	8	11	13
Pole vault	M	11	16	6	13	7	8	14	5	4	3	12	2	1	9	10	15
Pole vault	W	13	15	5	4	9	10	1	7	2	12	14	6	3	8	16	11
Long jump	M	4	12	1	13	3	7	15	6	5	8	14	9	11	16	10	2
Long jump	W	1	10	14	4	9	8	12	13	2	5	15	6	16	11	7	3
Triple jump	M	16	3	14	7	6	1	12	4	2	10	13	8	11	9	5	15
Triple jump	W	4	12	13	8	2	10	1	7	3	9	5	16	15	6	11	14
Shot put	M	3	7	11	8	2	5	4	12	6	1	16	14	15	9	10	13
Shot put	W	8	14	1	13	3	11	7	10	15	5	6	2	9	4	12	16
Discus throw	M	15	9	7	12	10	6	4	3	5	8	11	14	1	2	16	13
Discus throw	W	8	7	3	16	5	15	2	12	13	11	6	9	4	1	10	14
Hammer throw	M	3	8	11	10	13	4	14	5	2	1	16	6	7	12	9	15
Hammer throw	W	3	8	2	5	12	13	10	14	4	1	16	15	7	11	6	9
Javelin throw	M	5	13	2	7	10	15	4	9	1	8	16	14	3	12	11	6
Javelin throw	W	16	7	2	11	8	6	10	3	4	13	15	1	14	5	9	12
Country		AUT	BEL	BUL	CRO	CYP	DEN	EST	IRL	ISR	LAT	NOR	ROU	SRB	SVK	SLO	TUR
Total		318	451.5	240.5	308.5	245.5	335	266.5	349	258.5	212	400	285	253	304.5	402.5	382

== Third Division ==
=== Participating nations ===
- Albania
- Andorra
- Armenia
- Azerbaijan
- Bosnia and Herzegovina
- Georgia
- Iceland
- Kosovo
- Liechtenstein
- Luxembourg
- Malta
- Moldova
- Montenegro
- North Macedonia
- San Marino

Athletes from Gibraltar and Monaco did not participate. They last competed in 2021 as part of the combined Athletic Association of Small States of Europe (AASSE) team, which also included Liechtenstein.

=== Results ===
Men

Event	First		Second		Third	
100 m	Alham Naghiyev; Azerbaijan	10.42	Francesco Sansovini; San Marino	10.59	Kristófer Thorgrímsson; Iceland	10.82
200 m	Alham Naghiyev; Azerbaijan	20.75	Franko Burraj; Albania	20.97 NR	Bakir Musić; Bosnia and Herzegovina	21.10
400 m	Franko Burraj; Albania	45.87 NR	Matthew Galea Soler; Malta	46.90	Ivan Galușco; Moldova	47.05
800 m	Amel Tuka; Bosnia and Herzegovina	1:49.37	Mathis Espagnet; Luxembourg	1:50.02	Leon Thaqi; Kosovo	1:50.68
1500 m	Nahuel Carabaña; Andorra	3:45.31	Yervand Mkrtchyan; Armenia	3:45.98	Gaspar Klückers; Luxembourg	3:51.81
5000 m	Dario Ivanovski; North Macedonia	14:04.06	Baldvin Magnusson; Iceland	14:30.71	Maxim Rãileanu; Moldova	14:37.69
3000 m steeplechase	Gil Weicherding; Luxembourg	8:49.34	Hlynur Andrésson; Iceland	9:08.99	Luke Micallef; Malta	9:16.16
110 m hurdles	Matija Vojvodić; Montenegro	14.58	Benjamin Bojanić; Bosnia and Herzegovina	14.65	Benjamin Salnitro; Malta	14.98
400 m hurdles	Ívar Kristinn Jasonarson; Iceland	52.06	Eloi Vilella Escolano; Andorra	52.16	David Friederich; Luxembourg	53.01
4 × 100 m	Iceland (ISL); Arnar Logi Brynjarsson; Sveinbjörn Óli Svavrsson; Thorleifur Einar Leifsson; Kristófer Thorgrímsson	40.85	North Macedonia (MKD); Mihail Petrov; Jovan Stojoski; Marko Aleksovski; Andrea Trajkovski	40.89 NR	Luxembourg (LUX); Enguerran Bossicard; David Wallig; Louis Muller; Luc Dostert	41.26
High jump	Marko Šuković; Bosnia and Herzegovina	2.09	Charel Gaspar; Luxembourg	2.09	Brajan Avia; North Macedonia	2.09
Pole vault	Arian Milicija; Bosnia and Herzegovina	4.85	Miquel Vilchez Vendrell; Andorra	4.60	Nicolai Bonello; Malta	4.35
Long jump	Andreas Trajkovski; North Macedonia	7.83	Daníel Ingi Egilsson; Iceland	7.79	Gor Hovakimyan; Armenia	7.67
Triple jump	Rustam Mammadov; Azerbaijan	16.31	Gor Hovakimyan; Armenia	16.29	Lasha Gulelauri; Georgia	15.83
Shot put	Giorgi Majuaridze; Georgia	19.80	Mesud Pezer; Bosnia and Herzegovina	19.14	Alexandr Mazur; Moldova	18.70
Discus throw	Temuri Abulashvili; Georgia	57.75	Voislav Grubiša; Bosnia and Herzegovina	56.64	Mímir Sigurðsson; Iceland	55.78
Hammer throw	Hilmar Örn Jónsson; Iceland	73.44	Serghei Marghiev; Moldova	70.26	Goga Tchikhvaria; Georgia	59.51
Javelin throw	Andrian Mardare; Moldova	81.07	Sindri Guðmundsson; Iceland	74.54	Matthias Verling; Liechtenstein	72.90 NR

Mixed

Event	First		Second		Third	
4 × 400 m	Luxembourg (LUX); Glenn Lassine; Fanny Arendt; David Friederich; Elise Romero	3:25.57 NR	Iceland (ISL); Ívar Kristinn Jasonarson; Guðbjörg Jóna Bjarnadóttir; Samundur Ólafsson; Ísold Sævarsdóttir	3:25.96	Malta (MLT); Nick Bonett; Martha Spiteri; Matthew Galae Soler; Gina McNamara	3:26.79

Women

Event	First		Second		Third	
100 m	Alessandra Gasparelli; San Marino	11.50 NR	Lamiya Valiyeva; Azerbaijan	11.62	Eir Hlesdóttir; Iceland	11.69
200 m	Eir Hlesdóttir; Iceland	23.44 NR	Lamiya Valiyeva; Azerbaijan	23.58	Alessandra Gasparelli; San Marino	23.84
400 m	Fanny Arendt; Luxembourg	53.49	Ani Mamatsashvili; Georgia	54.60	Guðbjörg Jóna Bjarnadóttir; Iceland	55.00
800 m	Gina McNamara; Malta	2:10.05	Aníta Hinriksdóttir; Iceland	2:10.52	Relaksa Dauti; Albania	2:13.12
1500 m	Gina McNamara; Malta	4:27.22	Gresa Bakraçi; Kosovo	4:28.73	Redia Dauti; Albania	4:33.52
5000 m	Kimberly Chinfatt; Luxembourg	16:23.65	Andrea Kolbeinsdóttir; Iceland	16:53.93	Ecaterina Cernat; Andorra	17:42.85
3000 m steeplechase	Andreea Stavila; Moldova	9:55.81	Andrea Kolbeinsdóttir; Iceland	10:07.38 NR	Jeanne Cros; Andorra	11:25.11
100 m hurdles	Victoria Rausch; Luxembourg	13.23	Júlía Kristín Jóhannesdóttir; Iceland	13.75	Maša Garić; Bosnia and Herzegovina	13.93
400 m hurdles	Duna Viñals; Andorra	59.75	Maša Garić; Bosnia and Herzegovina	59.80	Uyana Granger; Luxembourg	1:01.16
4 × 100 m	Iceland (ISL); Eir Hlesdottir; Ísold Sævarsdóttir; María Helga Högnadóttir; Júlía Kristin Jóhannesdóttir	46.03	Luxembourg (LUX); Sandrine Rossi; Victoria Rausch; Anaïs Bauer; Camille Gaeng	46.18	Malta (MLT); Alessia Cristina; Claire Azzopardi; Thea Parnis Coleira; Martha Spiteri	46.99
High jump	Marija Vuković; Montenegro	1.85	Birta María Haraldsdóttir; Iceland	1.81	Sara Lučić; Bosnia and Herzegovina	1.79
Pole vault	Karen Sif Ársælsdóttir; Iceland	3.55	Martina Muraccini; San Marino	3.45	Sana Grillo; Malta	3.30
Long jump	Rachela Pace; Malta	6.39	Birna Kristín Kristjánsdóttir; Iceland	6.31	Mari Dzagnidze; Georgia	6.30
Triple jump	Yekaterina Sariyeva; Azerbaijan	13.87	Irma Gunnarsdóttir; Iceland	13.72 NR	Rachela Pace; Malta	13.39
Shot put	Erna Sóley Gunnarsdóttir; Iceland	16.05	Alexandra Emilianov; Moldova	15.80	Sopiko Shatirishvili; Georgia	15.04
Discus throw	Alexandra Emilianov; Moldova	61.84	Hera Christenen; Iceland	53.80	Jule Insinna; Liechtenstein	49.94 NR
Hammer throw	Yipsi Moreno; Albania	67.96 NR	Guðrún Karítas Hallgrímsdóttir; Iceland	66.04	Sofia Snäll; Luxembourg	57.45
Javelin throw	Arndís Diljá Óskarsdóttir; Iceland	51.60	Noémie Pleimling; Luxembourg	50.45	Marija Bogavac; Montenegro	49.80

=== Score table ===
Event		ALB	AND	ARM	AZE	BIH	GEO	ISL	KOS	LIE	LUX	MLT	MDA	MNE	MKD	SMR
100 metres	M	10	9	7	15	12	6	13	2	–	4	5	3	8	11	14
100 metres	W	10	4	12	14	8	7	13	2	5	9	11	3	1	6	15
200 metres	M	14	6	5	15	13	0	10	4	–	7	12	11	3	9	8
200 metres	W	10	5	12	14	9	8	15	4	6	11	0	7	3	2	13
400 metres	M	15	10	0	5	11	4	8	3	–	9	14	13	12	7	6
400 metres	W	11	6	7	12	5	14	13	2	8	15	9	10	3	1	4
800 metres	M	9	7	12	2	15	4	8	13	–	14	10	11	6	5	3
800 metres	W	13	11	9	10	6	7	14	4	5	12	15	8	1	3	2
1500 metres	M	–	15	14	9	12	5	10	4	–	13	8	11	6	7	3
1500 metres	W	13	8	7	9	6	4	10	14	–	11	15	12	3	5	2
5000 metres	M	–	12	7	3	11	9	14	4	–	8	10	13	5	15	6
5000 metres	W	–	12	8	9	6	4	14	7	–	15	10	13	5	11	0
3000 metre steeplechase	M	–	–	12	5	8	10	14	7	–	15	13	11	6	9	–
3000 metre steeplechase	W	–	12.5	–	4	9	5	14	7	–	12.5	11	15	8	10	6
110 metre hurdles 100 metre hurdles	M	11	0	6	5	14	12	0	4	–	9	13	10	15	8	7
110 metre hurdles 100 metre hurdles	W	8	–	9	4	13	7	14	2	11	15	5	12	10	6	3
400 metre hurdles	M	3	14	5	6	4	8	15	2	–	13	10	9	7	11	12
400 metre hurdles	W	12	15	8	3	14	10	11	2	–	13	6	9	5	4	7
4 × 100 metres relay	M	5	7	9	12	0	6	15	4	–	13	10	0	8	14	11
4 × 100 metres relay	W	11	3	5	0	12	7	15	4	0	14	13	9	6	8	10
4 × 400 metres relay	X	–	10	–	12	11	7	14	–	–	15	13	–	9	–	8
High jump	M	6	3	–	5	15	11	9	2	12	14	4	8	10	13	7
High jump	W	6	8	2	4	13	5	14	–	7	12	3	11	15	10	9
Pole vault	M	–	14	–	6	15	9	12	–	–	11	13	7	8	10	5
Pole vault	W	–	–	–	8	12	9	15	–	–	11	13	10	–	–	14
Long jump	M	–	3	13	12	10	7	14	4	–	8	5	11	9	15	6
Long jump	W	3	4	11	9	10	13	14	1	2	6	15	12	8	7	5
Triple jump	M	11	–	14	15	10	13	7	5	–	9	6	12	4	8	3
Triple jump	W	3	2	11	15	8	12	14	4	–	9	13	10	7	6	5
Shot put	M	6	2	7	10	14	15	9	12	3	8	5	13	11	4	1
Shot put	W	3	1	5	9	8	13	15	4	10	11	7	14	12	6	2
Discus throw	M	5	3	9	11	14	15	13	6	–	10	4	7	12	8	2
Discus throw	W	–	4	5	8	12	10	14	3	13	11	6	15	7	9	2
Hammer throw	M	6	8	7	5	11	13	15	3	–	12	10	14	4	9	–
Hammer throw	W	15	4	9	6	12	5	14	–	–	12	10	11	7	8	–
Javelin throw	M	6	1	7	9	12	10	14	8	13	3	2	15	11	4	5
Javelin throw	W	5	6	10	9	8	3	15	7	12	14	4	11	13	2	1
Country		ALB	AND	ARM	AZE	BIH	GEO	ISL	KOS	LIE	LUX	MLT	MDA	MNE	MKD	SMR
Total		223	229.5	264	315.5	383	307	461.5	154	107	410	333.5	371	268	270.5	207.5
