= 2025 European Athletics Team Championships Third Division =

Below are the full startlists and, when confirmed, results of the 2025 European Athletics Team Championships Third Division on 24–25 June 2025 in Maribor, Slovenia.

== Overall standings ==
Rank	Nation	Points	EW
1	Iceland	461.5	8
2	Luxembourg	410	5
3	Bosnia and Herzegovina	383	3
4	Moldova	371	3
5	Malta	333.5	3
6	Azerbaijan	315.5	4
7	Georgia	307	2
8	North Macedonia	270.5	2
9	Montenegro	268	2
10	Armenia	264	0
11	Andorra	229.5	2
12	Albania	223	2
13	San Marino	207.5	1
14	Kosovo	154	0
15	Liechtenstein	107	0

== Men's events ==
Key: WR= world record - ER = European Record - EL = 2023 European lead - CR = Championships record - NR = National record - NU23R = National Under-23 record

=== 100 metres ===
Place	Heat	Lane	Athlete	Nation	Time	Notes	Points
1	B	5	Alham Naghiyev	Azerbaijan	10.42	PB	15
2	B	4	Francesco Sansovini	San Marino	10.59		14
3	B	6	Kristófer Þorgrímsson	Iceland	10.82		13
4	B	2	Edhem Vikalo	Bosnia and Herzegovina	10.83	SB	12
5	B	7	Marko Aleksovski	North Macedonia	10.83	PB	11
6	A	2	Leandro Cardaku	Albania	10.85	PB	10
7	B	3	Dylan Ben-Ahmed	Andorra	10.88		9
8	A	8	Ognjen Marsenić	Montenegro	10.92	SB	8
9	A	6	Samvel Gevorgyan	Armenia	10.93	SB	7
10	A	4	Andro Grigoryan	Georgia	11.05	PB	6
11	A	5	Luke Bezzina	Malta	11.07		5
12	B	8	Enguerran Bossicard	Luxembourg	11.14		4
13	A	3	Alexandru Zatic	Moldova	11.15	SB	3
14	A	7	Granit Ahmeti	Kosovo	11.16	SB	2

=== 200 metres ===
Place	Heat	Lane	Athlete	Nation	Time	Notes	Points
1	B	6	Alham Naghiyev	Azerbaijan	20.75	PB	15
2	A	6	Franko Burraj	Albania	20.97	NR	14
3	B	5	Bakir Musić	Bosnia and Herzegovina	21.10	PB	13
4	B	3	Matthew Galea Soler	Malta	21.40	PB	12
5	A	5	Ivan Galușco	Moldova	21.41	PB	11
6	B	7	Kristófer Þorgrímsson	Iceland	21.60		10
7	B	4	Jovan Stojoski	North Macedonia	21.63		9
8	B	8	Alessandro Gasperoni	San Marino	22.02		8
9	A	4	Enguerran Bossicard	Luxembourg	22.21		7
10	B	2	Guillem Arderiu Vilanova	Andorra	22.24		6
11	A	7	Samvel Gevorgyan	Armenia	22.59	SB	5
12	A	8	Granit Ahmeti	Kosovo	23.25	PB	4
13	A	3	Ognjen Marsenić	Montenegro	25.88	SB	3
—	A	2	Andro Grigoryan	Georgia	DQ		0

=== 400 metres ===
Place	Heat	Lane	Athlete	Nation	Time	Notes	Points
1	B	5	Franko Burraj	Albania	45.87	NR	15
2	B	6	Matthew Galea Soler	Malta	46.90	PB	14
3	B	7	Ivan Galușco	Moldova	47.05	PB	13
4	A	3	Mihailo Roćenović	Montenegro	47.74	PB	12
5	B	4	Amel Tuka	Bosnia and Herzegovina	47.97	SB	11
6	B	8	Pau Blasi	Andorra	48.92		10
7	A	6	Glenn Lassine	Luxembourg	49.14		9
8	B	3	Samundur Ólafsson	Iceland	49.16		8
9	A	5	Mihail Petrov	North Macedonia	49.32		7
10	B	2	Probo Benvenuti	San Marino	49.42		6
11	A	4	Novruz Asadli	Azerbaijan	50.42		5
12	A	8	Levan Kvaratskhelia	Georgia	53.64	SB	4
13	A	2	Bardh Telaku	Kosovo	56.04	SB	3
—	A	7	Vahe Avagyan	Armenia	DQ		0

=== 800 metres ===
Place	Heat	Lane	Athlete	Nation	Time	Notes	Points
1	B	4	Amel Tuka	Bosnia and Herzegovina	1:49.37		15
2	B	5	Mathis Espagnet	Luxembourg	1:50.02		14
3	B	7	Leon Thaqi	Kosovo	1:50.68		13
4	A	5	Yervand Mkrtchyan	Armenia	1:50.75	SB	12
5	B	8	Stanislav Ghereg	Moldova	1:51.42	PB	11
6	B	6	Isaac Bonnici	Malta	1:52.86		10
7	B	2	Bakhtiyar Asgarli	Azerbaijan	1:53.96	PB	9
8	B	3	Dadi Arnarson	Iceland	1:55.08		8
9	A	4	Carles Gómez Lozano	Andorra	1:56.75	SB	7
10	A	3	Mihailo Roćenović	Montenegro	1:56.98	PB	6
11	A	7	Gilman Junuzi	North Macedonia	1:57.40	PB	5
12	A	6	Aleksandre Aivazyan	Georgia	1:57.64		4
13	A	8	Andrea Ercolani Volta	San Marino	2:01.69	SB	3
14	A	2	Julian Vila	Albania	2:08.07	SB	2

=== 1500 metres ===
Place	Athlete	Nation	Time	Notes	Points
1	Nahuel Carabaña	Andorra	3:45.31	PB	15
2	Yervand Mkrtchyan	Armenia	3:45.98		14
3	Gasper Klückers	Luxembourg	3:51.81		13
4	Mlađen Samardžić	Bosnia and Herzegovina	3:53.24	PB	12
5	Ivan Siuris	Moldova	3:54.13	SB	11
6	Hlynur Andrésson	Iceland	3:55.87	SB	10
7	Bakhtiyar Asgarli	Azerbaijan	3:59.68		9
8	Isaac Bonnici	Malta	4:06.54		8
9	Kosta Petroski	North Macedonia	4:08.92	SB	7
10	Miljan Kukuličić	Montenegro	4:09.30	PB	6
11	Aleksandre Aivazyan	Georgia	4:10.50	SB	5
12	Amar Maxhuni	Kosovo	4:15.55	SB	4
13	Davide Venerucci	San Marino	4:30.70	SB	3

=== 5000 metres ===
Place	Athlete	Nation	Time	Notes	Points
1	Dario Ivanovski	North Macedonia	14:04.06	SB	15
2	Baldvin Magnusson	Iceland	14:30.71	SB	14
3	Maxim Răileanu	Moldova	14:37.69	SB	13
4	Carles Gómez Lozano	Andorra	14:43.90	SB	12
5	Uroš Gutić	Bosnia and Herzegovina	14:46.26	SB	11
6	Simon Spiteri	Malta	14:46.27		10
7	Daviti Kharazishvili	Georgia	15:16.96	SB	9
8	Yannick Lieners	Luxembourg	15:27.21	SB	8
9	Roman Aleksanyan	Armenia	15:36.15	SB	7
10	Lorenzo Bugli	San Marino	15:37.80	PB	6
11	Željko Dabović	Montenegro	16:20.04	PB	5
12	Tirron Mamusha	Kosovo	16:24.88	SB	4
13	Amrah Naghiyev	Azerbaijan	16:48.21		3

=== 110 metres hurdles ===
Place	Heat	Lane	Athlete	Nation	Time	Notes	Points
1	B	3	Matija Vojvodić	Montenegro	14.58	PB	15
2	B	5	Benjamin Bojanić	Bosnia and Herzegovina	14.65	PB	14
3	B	8	Benjamin Salnitro	Malta	14.98	PB	13
4	A	7	Bessarion Ilariani	Georgia	15.14	SB	12
5	A	4	Milen Caco	Albania	15.17	PB	11
6	B	2	Ilia Padaliuc	Moldova	15.43	PB	10
7	A	5	Claude Godart	Luxembourg	15.46	SB	9
8	B	7	Ognen Stefanovski	North Macedonia	15.48		8
9	A	3	Simone Gorini	San Marino	16.18	NR	7
10	A	6	Aram Aramyan	Armenia	17.17	SB	6
11	A	8	Eljan Jafarov	Azerbaijan	20.29	SB	5
12	A	2	Art Grajçevci	Kosovo	21.34	SB	4
—	B	4	Þorleifur Einar Leifsson	Iceland	DQ		0
—	B	6	Pol Herreros	Andorra	DQ		0

=== 400 metres hurdles ===
Place	Heat	Lane	Athlete	Nation	Time	Notes	Points
1	B	7	Ívar Kristinn Jasonarson	Iceland	52.06		15
2	B	5	Eloi Vilella Escolano	Andorra	52.16	PB	14
3	B	4	David Friederich	Luxembourg	53.01		13
4	B	3	Andrea Ercolani Volta	San Marino	53.85	SB	12
5	B	6	Jovan Stojoski	North Macedonia	53.97		11
6	B	8	Jordan Pace	Malta	55.26		10
7	B	2	Liviu Ciobanu	Moldova	55.43	PB	9
8	A	6	Levan Kvaratskhelia	Georgia	56.20	PB	8
9	A	8	Dragan Pešić	Montenegro	56.25	SB	7
10	A	7	Javid Mammadov	Azerbaijan	56.63	SB	6
11	A	3	Aram Aramyan	Armenia	57.39	PB	5
12	A	4	Luka Ivičić	Bosnia and Herzegovina	58.13		4
13	A	5	Durjon Idrizaj	Albania	58.83		3
14	A	2	Diamant Bekteshi	Kosovo	1:07.56	SB	2

=== 3000 metres steeplechase ===
Place	Athlete	Nation	Time	Notes	Points
1	Gil Weicherding	Luxembourg	8:49.34	PB	15
2	Hlynur Andrésson	Iceland	9:08.99	SB	14
3	Luke Micallef	Malta	9:16.18	SB	13
4	Roman Aleksanyan	Armenia	9:42.58	SB	12
5	Gheorghe Buzulan	Moldova	9:50.38	PB	11
6	Giorgi Lomidze	Georgia	9:51.93	PB	10
7	Kosta Petroski	North Macedonia	9:52.84	PB	9
8	Kristijan Roljić	Bosnia and Herzegovina	10:02.52	SB	8
9	Albion Ymeri	Kosovo	10:03.77	SB	7
10	Miljan Kukuličić	Montenegro	10:07.97	PB	6
11	Amrah Naghiyev	Azerbaijan	10:08.06	PB	5

=== 4 × 100 metres relay ===
Place	Heat	Lane	Country	Athletes	Time	Notes	Points
1	B	6	Iceland	Sveinbjörn Óli Svavarsson, Arnar Logi Brynjarsson, Þorleifur Einar Leifsson, Kristófer Þorgrímsson	40.85	SB	15
2	A	7	North Macedonia	Andreas Trajkovski, Marko Aleksovski, Mihail Petrov, Jovan Stojoski	40.89	NR	14
3	B	5	Luxembourg	Luc Dostert, David Wallig, Enguerran Bossicard, Louis Muller	41.26	SB	13
4	B	3	Azerbaijan	Aleksey Aliakbarov, Eljan Jafarov, Novruz Asadli, Alham Naghiyev	41.82	SB	12
5	A	4	San Marino	Matias Francini, Giammarco Gulini, Santos Nicolas Bollini, Francesco Sansovini	41.91	SB	11
6	B	8	Malta	Kurt Zahra, Omar El Aida Chaffey, Luke Bezzina, Luca Gerada	41.94	SB	10
7	A	5	Armenia	Davit Ghukasyan, Gor Hovakimyan, Vahe Avagyan, Samvel Gevorgyan	42.00	SB	9
8	A	8	Montenegro	Ognjen Marsenić, Nemanja Džaković, Mihailo Roćenović, Matija Vojvodić	42.07	SB	8
9	A	6	Andorra	Dylan Ben-Ahmed, Guillem Arderiu Vilanova, Pau Blasi, Pol Herreros	42.13	NR	7
10	B	2	Georgia	Andro Grigoryan, Mamia Maghalashvili, Luka Kuphunia, Bessarion Ilariani	42.45	SB	6
11	A	3	Albania	Milen Caco, Julian Vila, Stivi Kereku, Leandro Cardaku	42.91	SB	5
12	A	2	Kosovo	Bardh Telaku, Enis Bytyqi, Altin Ukaj, Granit Ahmeti	43.27	NR	4
—	B	7	Moldova	Alexandru Zatic, Ilia Padaliuc, Timofei Cristea, Nichita Calinin	DQ		0
—	B	4	Bosnia and Herzegovina	Andrej Ćebić, Edhem Vikalo, Haris Pilavdžija, Bakir Musić	DNF		0

=== High jump ===
Place	Group	Athlete	Nation	1.55	1.60	1.65	1.70	1.75	1.80	1.85	1.90	1.94	1.98	2.02	2.06	2.09	2.11	2.13	Result	Notes	Points
1	A	Marko Šuković	Bosnia and Herzegovina	–	–	–	–	–	–	–	o	o	o	o	xo	o	xxx		2.09		15
2	A	Charel Gaspar	Luxembourg	–	–	–	–	–	–	–	–	o	–	o	xo	o	xxx		2.09		14
3	A	Brajan Avia	North Macedonia	–	–	–	–	–	o	o	o	o	o	xo	xo	xxx			2.06	PB	13
4	A	Joel Riesen	Liechtenstein	–	–	–	–	–	–	–	–	xo	o	xxx					1.98		12
5	B	Bessarion Ilariani	Georgia	o	–	o	o	o	o	o	o	o	xxx						1.94	PB	11
6	A	Radovan Sošić	Montenegro	–	–	–	–	–	o	o	xo	xo	xxx						1.94	SB	10
7	A	Þorleifur Einar Leifsson	Iceland	–	–	–	–	o	–	o	xxo	xx							1.90		9
8	A	Victor Fondos	Moldova	–	–	–	–	o	o	xo	xxx								1.85		8
9	A	Simone Piva	San Marino	–	–	–	–	–	–	xxo	–	xx							1.85		7
10	B	Milen Caco	Albania	–	–	–	–	o	o	xxx									1.80	SB	6
11	B	Kasgin Abbaszade	Azerbaijan	xo	o	o	o	o	xxx										1.75		5
12	B	Ryan John Zammit	Malta	o	o	o	xxx												1.70	SB	4
13	B	Miquel Vilchez Vendrell	Andorra	o	–	xxx													1.55	SB	3
14	B	Art Grajçevci	Kosovo	xxo	–	–	xx												1.55	SB	2

=== Pole vault ===
Place	Athlete	Nation	2.30	2.50	2.70	2.90	3.10	3.30	3.50	3.70	3.90	4.05	4.15	4.25	4.35	4.45	4.50	4.55	4.60	4.65	4.70	4.75	4.80	4.85	4.90	4.95	5.00	Result	Notes	Points
1	Arian Milicija	Bosnia and Herzegovina	–	–	–	–	–	–	–	–	–	–	–	–	–	–	–	–	o	–	o	–	–	o	–	–	xxx	4.85		15
2	MIquel Vilchez Vendrell	Andorra	–	–	–	–	–	–	–	–	–	o	–	xo	o	o	–	–	xo	–	xx							4.60		14
3	Nicolai Bonello	Malta	–	–	–	–	–	–	–	–	o	o	o	o	o	xxx												4.35	SB	13
4	Gunnar Eyjólfsson	Iceland	–	–	–	–	–	–	–	–	–	–	xo	–	xo	–	xx											4.35	SB	11.5
4	Joe Seil	Luxembourg	–	–	–	–	–	–	–	–	o	o	xo	o	xo	xxx												4.35	SB	11.5
6	Ognen Stefanovski	North Macedonia	–	–	–	–	–	o	o	xxo	–	o	xx															4.05	NR	10
7	Lasha Karkusashvili	Georgia	–	–	–	–	–	–	–	o	o	xo	xxx															4.05	SB	9
8	Dragan Pešić	Montenegro	–	–	–	–	–	–	–	–	o	xxx																3.90	SB	8
9	Timofei Cristea	Moldova	–	–	–	–	–	–	xo	xxx																		3.50		7
10	Jabir Aliyev	Azerbaijan	o	o	xo	xo	o	xr																				3.10	=PB	6
11	Elia Carattoni	San Marino	–	xxo	xx																							2.50	SB	5

=== Long jump ===
Place	Athlete	Nation	#1	#2	#3	#4	#5	#6	Result	Notes	Points
1	Andreas Trajkovski	North Macedonia	7.70 (−0.3 m/s)	7.74 (+0.2 m/s)	7.78 (±0.0 m/s)	7.64 (−0.5 m/s)	7.83 (+1.5 m/s)	7.62 (+1.5 m/s)	7.83 (+1.5 m/s)		15
2	Daníel Ingi Egilsson	Iceland	x	x	7.79 (+1.9 m/s)	7.60 (−0.8 m/s)	7.78 (+2/5 m/s)	x	7.79 (+1.9 m/s)	SB	14
3	Gor Hovakimyan	Armenia	7.36	7.41 (+3.7 m/s)	7.67 (±0.0 m/s)	7.50 (+0.9 m/s)	7.57 (+2.1 m/s)	7.66 (+1.9 m/s)	7.67 (±0.0 m/s)	PB	13
4	Jabir Aliyev	Azerbaijan	6.95	x	7.42 (+1.1 m/s)	5.37 (−0.8 m/s)	4.55 (+2.1 m/s)	x	7.42 (+1.1 m/s)		12
5	Vadim Doscalov	Moldova	7.10 (+1.3 m/s)	r					7.10 (+1.3 m/s)	SB	11
6	Andrej Ćebić	Bosnia and Herzegovina	5.27 (+2.7 m/s)	6.90 (+2.4 m/s)	x	5.48 (−0.1 m/s)	x		6.90 (+2.4 m/s)		10
7	Matija Vojvodić	Montenegro	x	6.52 (+1.8 m/s)	x	x	6.72 (+0.7 m/s)		6.72 (+0.7 m/s)	PB	9
8	Nils Liefgen	Luxembourg	6.07 (+0.4 m/s)	x	6.71 (+2.0 m/s)	x	x		6.71 (+2.0 m/s)		8
9	Luka Kuphunia	Georgia	6.48 (+0.4 m/s)	x	6.33 (+0.7 m/s)				6.48 (+0.4 m/s)	SB	7
10	Davide Davosi	San Marino	6.06 (+1.8 m/s)	5.92 (+0.1 m/s)	6.19 (+3.2 m/s)				6.19 (+3.2 m/s)	SB	6
11	Flavio Romeo	Malta	x	x	6.10 (+2.1 m/s)				6.10 (+2.1 m/s)		5
12	Diard Maraj	Kosovo	4.55 (+2.7 m/s)	6.04 (+0.5 m/s)	4.49 (+2.1 m/s)				6.04 (+0.5 m/s)		4
13	Miquel Vilchez Vendrell	Andorra	6.00 (+0.2 m/s)	5.83 (+0.1 m/s)	x				6.00 (+0.2 m/s)	SB	3

=== Triple jump ===
Place	Athlete	Nation	#1	#2	#3	#4	#5	#6	Result	Notes	Points
1	Rustam Mammadov	Azerbaijan	15.84	16.31	x	x	16.26	16.07	16.31		15
2	Gor Hovakimyan	Armenia	15.41	16.12	x	16.11	16.29	x	16.29	PB	14
3	Lasha Gulelauri	Georgia	15.83	x	15.27	x	x	x	15.83		13
4	Vadim Doscalov	Moldova	14.91	14.65	14.51	x	15.41	15.31	15.41	SB	12
5	Kolindo Kiri	Albania	14.46	14.95	15.05	14.85	15.25		15.25	PB	11
6	Stefan Stanković	Bosnia and Herzegovina	13.96	14.42	14.48	14.21	14.60		14.60	PB	10
7	Louis Muller	Luxembourg	14.42	14.51	14.26	13.17	x		14.51		9
8	Brajan Avia	North Macedonia	14.11	14.07	x	x	x		14.11	PB	8
9	Guðjón Dunbar D. Torsteinsson	Iceland	13.87	13.69	13.70				13.87		7
10	Ian Paul Grech	Malta	13.78	x	13.71				13.78		6
11	Diard Maraj	Kosovo	12.98	13.08	13.39				13.39	SB	5
12	Matija Vojvodić	Montenegro	12.70	12.98	x				12.98	PB	4
13	Davide Davosi	San Marino	x	12.50	12.58				12.58	SB	3

=== Shot put ===
Place	Athlete	Nation	#1	#2	#3	#4	#5	#6	Result	Notes	Points
1	Giorgi Mujaridze	Georgia	19.76	x	x	x	19.38	19.80	19.80		15
2	Mesud Pezer	Bosnia and Herzegovina	19.14	x	18.95	x	x	x	19.14		14
3	Alexandr Mazur	Moldova	18.70	x	x	18.13	x	18.04	18.70		13
4	Muhamet Ramadani	Kosovo	18.40	18.48	18.47	18.44	x	18.20	18.48		12
5	Tomaš Đurović	Montenegro	16.38	16.84	16.58	17.14	x		17.14		11
6	Ismail Aliyev	Azerbaijan	16.80	17.09	x	x	16.95		17.09		10
7	Sigursteinn Ásgeirsson	Iceland	x	15.58	15.39	x	15.65		15.65		9
8	Sven Forster	Luxembourg	14.79	x	x	14.94	15.16		15.16	SB	8
9	Manuk Manukyan	Armenia	13.77	13.56	14.29				14.29		7
10	Azgan Zeka	Albania	13.90	14.09	13.15				14.09	SB	6
11	Miguel Buttigieg	Malta	x	11.86	11.54				11.86	SB	5
12	Marjan Nojkovski	North Macedonia	11.42	11.78	11.49				11.78	SB	4
13	Matthias Verling	Liechtenstein	x	11.43	9.48				11.43		3
14	Guillem Arderiu Vilanova	Andorra	10.16	10.28	9.93				10.28	SB	2
15	Simone Gorini	San Marino	7.76	8.44	7.31				8.44	SB	1

=== Discus throw ===
Place	Athlete	Nation	#1	#2	#3	#4	#5	#6	Result	Notes	Points
1	Temuri Abulashvili	Georgia	55.33	56.24	56.02	x	57.75	56.69	57.75		15
2	Voislav Grubiša	Bosnia and Herzegovina	50.25	52.99	x	53.13	54.46	56.64	56.64		14
3	Mimir Sigurdsson	Iceland	49.24	55.78	54.37	x	54.65	x	55.78	SB	13
4	Ivan Kukuličić	Montenegro	51.98	x	51.02	51.77	x	51.51	51.98		12
5	Ismail Aliyev	Azerbaijan	46.82	43.78	47.37	48.83	50.66		50.66	SB	11
6	Sven Forster	Luxembourg	41.66	x	47.22	x	49.25		49.25	SB	10
7	Manuk Manukyan	Armenia	44.82	44.87	46.62	x	49.21		49.21	SB	9
8	Stefan Stefanoski	North Macedonia	46.22	45.57	45.32	44.22	x		46.22	PB	8
9	Alexandr Mazur	Moldova	x	x	45.16				45.16		7
10	Alaudin Suma	Kosovo	43.17	42.01	x				43.17	SB	6
11	Adriatik Hoxha	Albania	x	39.65	x				39.65	SB	5
12	Miguel Buttigieg	Malta	x	35.53	x				35.53	SB	4
13	Oriol Cerdà Cassi	Andorra	14.33	15.62	20.68				20.68	SB	3
14	Simone Zoffoli	San Marino	x	13.11	14.04				14.04	SB	2

=== Hammer throw ===
Place	Athlete	Nation	#1	#2	#3	#4	#5	#6	Result	Notes	Points
1	Hilmar Örn Jónsson	Iceland	66.78	x	70.37	73.44	x	71.84	73.44		15
2	Serghei Marghiev	Moldova	67.48	69.26	68.52	x	70.26	x	70.26		14
3	Goga Tchikhvaria	Georgia	57.08	x	x	58.07	x	49.58	58.07		13
4	Steve Weiwert	Luxembourg	44.82	47.89	50.50	50.38	x	x	50.50		12
5	Samir Vilić	Bosnia and Herzegovina	50.14	49.38	49.41	48.46	48.54		50.14	SB	11
6	Kareem Luca Chouhal	Malta	38.16	x	x	44.43	44.65		44.65		10
7	David Tasevski	North Macedonia	x	x	39.02	41.31	40.19		41.31		9
8	Oriol Cerdà Cassi	Andorra	x	x	27.80	x	26.96		27.80	PB	8
9	Vahan Manukyan	Armenia	27.41	27.14	x				27.41	SB	7
10	Azgan Zeka	Albania	23.79	21.86	25.40				25.40	SB	6
11	Tofig Mammadov	Azerbaijan	24.85	x	x				24.85		5
12	Tomaš Đurović	Montenegro	18.47	21.40	23.29				23.29	SB	4
13	Alaudin Suma	Kosovo	13.17	17.61	17.05				17.61	SB	3

=== Javelin throw ===
Place	Athlete	Nation	#1	#2	#3	#4	#5	#6	Result	Notes	Points
1	Andrian Mardare	Moldova	78.24	81.07	x	76.79	–	r	81.07	SB	15
2	Sindri Hrafn Guðmundsson	Iceland	74.54	x	x	70.14	r		74.54		14
3	Matthias Verling	Liechtenstein	72.90	66.10	64.94	r			72.90	NR	13
4	Dejan Mileusnić	Bosnia and Herzegovina	55.58	56.89	58.48	63.15	r		63.15		12
5	Amir Papazi	Montenegro	60.22	r					60.22		11
6	Irakli Zhorzholiani	Georgia	55.20	x	55.77	58.00	54.45		58.00		10
7	Orkhan Gasimov	Azerbaijan	47.33	53.31	53.76	54.51	53.85		54.51	SB	9
8	Bardhyl Hajdaraj	Kosovo	x	52.29	47.37	40.41	37.41		52.29	PB	8
9	Vahan Manukyan	Armenia	42.76	47.38	50.86				50.86	PB	7
10	Ingri Nelaj	Albania	48.21	50.44	47.66				50.44	SB	6
11	Diego Garnaroli	San Marino	43.94	46.19	44.11				46.19	SB	5
12	Ognen Stefanovski	North Macedonia	35.49	37.24	45.19				45.19		4
13	Max Wagner	Luxembourg	43.78	38.88	42.92				43.78	SB	3
14	Luca Gerada	Malta	40.74	39.99	41.55				41.55	SB	2
15	Oriol Cerdà Cassi	Andorra	18.34	22.38	26.13				26.13	SB	1

== Women's events ==
=== 100 metres ===
Place	Heat	Lane	Athlete	Nation	Time	Notes	Points
1	B	4	Alessandra Gasparelli	San Marino	11.50	NR	15
2	B	6	Lamiya Valiyeva	Azerbaijan	11.62	PB	14
3	B	7	Eir Hlesdóttir	Iceland	11.69	PB	13
4	B	5	Gayane Chiloyan	Armenia	11.93		12
5	B	3	Thea Parnis Coleiro	Malta	11.94		11
6	A	4	Paola Shyle	Albania	12.05	PB	10
7	B	8	Camille Gaeng	Luxembourg	12.15		9
8	B	2	Ajla Reizbegović	Bosnia and Herzegovina	12.18		8
9	A	6	Lika Kharchilava	Georgia	12.21	SB	7
10	A	3	Natura Malo	North Macedonia	12.37	PB	6
11	B	1	Fiona Matt	Liechtenstein	12.39		5
12	A	7	Aroa Carballo	Andorra	12.62	SB	4
13	A	2	Tatiana Contrebuț	Moldova	12.71	SB	3
14	A	8	Emine Jenuzi	Kosovo	12.75	SB	2
15	A	5	Mare Jablan	Montenegro	12.91		1

=== 200 metres ===
Place	Heat	Lane	Athlete	Nation	Time	Notes	Points
1	B	5	Eir Hlesdóttir	Iceland	23.44	NR	15
2	B	3	Lamiya Valiyeva	Azerbaijan	23.58	NR	14
3	B	6	Alessandra Gasparelli	San Marino	23.84	SB	13
4	B	4	Gayane Chiloyan	Armenia	24.39		12
5	B	8	Anaïs Bauer	Luxembourg	24.75	SB	11
6	A	3	Iljana Beqiri	Albania	24.78		10
7	B	2	Ajla Reizbegović	Bosnia and Herzegovina	24.98		9
8	A	4	Lika Kharchilava	Georgia	25.23		8
9	A	5	Tatiana Contrebuț	Moldova	25.53		7
10	A	7	Fiona Matt	Liechtenstein	25.69		6
11	B	1	Aroa Carballo	Andorra	25.77		5
12	A	2	Emine Jenuzi	Kosovo	25.83		4
13	A	6	Iva Djoković	Montenegro	25.94		3
14	A	8	Natura Malo	North Macedonia	26.31		2
—	B	7	Thea Parnis Coleiro	Malta	DQ		0

=== 400 metres ===
Place	Heat	Lane	Athlete	Nation	Time	Notes	Points
1	B	5	Fanny Arendt	Luxembourg	53.49		15
2	B	2	Ani Mamatsashvili	Georgia	54.60	PB	14
3	B	6	Guðbjörg Jóna Bjarnadóttir	Iceland	55.00		13
4	B	4	Ilaha Guliyeva	Azerbaijan	55.35	PB	12
5	B	7	Iljana Beqiri	Albania	55.82	PB	11
6	A	3	Xenia Berghii	Moldova	56.07	PB	10
7	B	3	Martha Spiteri	Malta	56.54	PB	9
8	B	1	Nadine Stüber	Liechtenstein	57.43		8
9	A	2	Marianna Baghyan	Armenia	57.46	SB	7
10	A	7	Noa Godoy	Andorra	58.43	PB	6
11	B	8	Džana Suljić	Bosnia and Herzegovina	58.65		5
12	A	4	Sofia Bucci	San Marino	59.12	PB	4
13	A	5	Anabela Mujovi	Montenegro	59.48	SB	3
14	A	6	Medina Kutleshi	Kosovo	59.91	SB	2
15	A	8	Sara Dimitrioski	North Macedonia	1:01.12	PB	1

=== 800 metres ===
Place	Heat	Lane	Athlete	Nation	Time	Notes	Points
1	B	4	Gina McNamara	Malta	2:10.05		15
2	B	5	Aníta Hinriksdóttir	Iceland	2:10.52		14
3	B	3	Relaksa Dauti	Albania	2:13.12		13
4	B	7	Carole Kill	Luxembourg	2:13.18		12
5	B	2	Maria Cristina Martins Patricio	Andorra	2:14.64	PB	11
6	A	4	Anna Yusupova	Azerbaijan	2:15.33	PB	10
7	A	6	Mari Sargsyan	Armenia	2:15.70	PB	9
8	B	1	Mihaela Botnari	Moldova	2:15.80	PB	8
9	A	5	Kristina Tchitadze	Georgia	2:15.91	PB	7
10	A	2	Glorija Kureš	Bosnia and Herzegovina	2:16.58	SB	6
11	B	8	Sienna Zobel	Liechtenstein	2:16.59		5
12	B	6	Erisë Avdullahu	Kosovo	2:18.65		4
13	A	3	Irma Hajdari	North Macedonia	2:22.12		3
14	A	7	Beatrice Berti	San Marino	2:35.32	SB	2
15	A	8	Vesna Pavličević	Montenegro	2:37.81	SB	1

=== 1500 metres ===
Place	Athlete	Nation	Time	Notes	Points
1	Gina McNamara	Malta	4:27.22		15
2	Gresa Bakraçi	Kosovo	4:28.73	SB	14
3	Redia Dauti	Albania	4:33.52	SB	13
4	Mihaela Botnari	Moldova	4:35.51	SB	12
5	Fanny Goy	Luxembourg	4:35.99		11
6	Embla Margrét Hreimsdóttir	Iceland	4:36.13		10
7	Anna Yusupova	Azerbaijan	4:37.87	PB	9
8	Aina Cinca Bons	Andorra	4:38.15		8
9	Mari Sargsyan	Armenia	4:39.02	PB	7
10	Glorija Kureš	Bosnia and Herzegovina	4:50.70	SB	6
11	Irma Hajdari	North Macedonia	4:53.32		5
12	Kristina Tchitadze	Georgia	5:17.79	SB	4
13	Vesna Pavličević	Montenegro	5:29.14	SB	3
14	Chiara Guiducci	San Marino	5:44.03	SB	2

=== 5000 metres ===
Place	Athlete	Nation	Time	Notes	Points
1	Kimberly Chinfatt	Luxembourg	16:23.65		15
2	Andrea Kolbeinsdóttir	Iceland	16:53.93	SB	14
3	Ecaterina Cernat	Moldova	17:42.85	PB	13
4	Jeanne Cros	Andorra	18:00.11	PB	12
5	Adrijana Pop Arsova	North Macedonia	18:00.38	SB	11
6	Lisa Bezzina	Malta	18:44.06	SB	10
7	Anna Yusupova	Azerbaijan	18:56.05	SB	9
8	Mari Sargsyan	Armenia	18:59.73	SB	8
9	Ejona Shala	Kosovo	19:30.35	PB	7
10	Ena Bećirović	Bosnia and Herzegovina	20:30.69	SB	6
11	Dijana Stanišić	Montenegro	21:14.26	SB	5
12	Nino Mikava	Georgia	22:38.96	SB	4
—	Melissa Michelotti	San Marino	DQ		0

=== 100 metres hurdles ===
Place	Heat	Lane	Athlete	Nation	Time	Notes	Points
1	B	5	Victoria Rausch	Luxembourg	13.23	NR	15
2	B	6	Júlía Kristín Jóhannesdóttir	Iceland	13.75		14
3	B	4	Maša Garić	Bosnia and Herzegovina	13.93	PB	13
4	B	7	Iana Garaeva	Moldova	14.42	SB	12
5	B	3	Julia Rohrer	Liechtenstein	14.64	SB	11
6	B	2	Andjela Drobnjak	Montenegro	15.02		10
7	B	8	Meline Adamyan	Armenia	15.35	PB	9
8	A	3	Rexhina Berami	Albania	15.39	PB	8
9	A	7	Lizi Mugalashvili	Georgia	15.92	SB	7
10	A	4	Dijana Vukanovikj	North Macedonia	17.12	SB	6
11	A	8	Zaida Pace	Malta	17.13	SB	5
12	A	5	Laman Isfandiyarova	Azerbaijan	17.67	PB	4
13	A	6	Anita Selva	San Marino	17.68	SB	3
14	A	2	Klea Keçi	Kosovo	21.46	SB	2

=== 400 metres hurdles ===
Place	Heat	Lane	Athlete	Nation	Time	Notes	Points
1	B	6	Duna Viñals	Andorra	59.75		15
2	B	5	Maša Garić	Bosnia and Herzegovina	59.80		14
3	B	4	Uyana Granger	Luxembourg	1:01.16		13
4	A	8	Livja Topi	Albania	1:02.60	PB	12
5	B	7	Ingibjörg Sigurðardóttir	Iceland	1:02.85		11
6	B	3	Ana Sokhadze	Georgia	1:03.07		10
7	B	2	Nicoleta Mocan	Moldova	1:04.87	PB	9
8	A	5	Meline Adamyan	Armenia	1:06.80	PB	8
9	B	8	Avril Soulignac-Bare	San Marino	1:06.86		7
10	A	6	Zaida Pace	Malta	1:06.87		6
11	A	3	Ivana Milošević	Montenegro	1:10.91	SB	5
12	A	4	Dijana Vukanovikj	North Macedonia	1:13.28		4
13	A	7	Laman Isfandiyarova	Azerbaijan	1:13.74		3
14	A	2	Vesa Jusufi	Kosovo	1:15.45	SB	2

=== 3000 metres steeplechase ===
Place	Athlete	Nation	Time	Notes	Points
1	Andreea Stavila	Moldova	9:55.81		15
2	Andrea Kolbeinsdóttir	Iceland	10:07.38	NR	14
3	Jeanne Cros	Andorra	11:25.11	PB	12.5
3	Liz Weiler	Luxembourg	11:25.11		12.5
5	Rosalie Borg	Malta	11:47.91		11
6	Milijana Ristikj	North Macedonia	11:49.49	NR	10
7	Elma Hasanbašić	Bosnia and Herzegovina	12:29.42	SB	9
8	Dijana Stanišić	Montenegro	13:18.64	SB	8
9	Valentina Kelmendi-Musa	Kosovo	13:30.02	SB	7
10	Chiara Guiducci	San Marino	13:52.80	NR	6
11	Kristina Tchitadze	Georgia	14:49.02	SB	5
12	Laman Isfandiyarova	Azerbaijan	16:03.68	SB	4

=== 4 × 100 metres relay ===
Place	Heat	Lane	Country	Athletes	Time	Notes	Points
1	B	5	Iceland	Júlía Kristín Jóhannesdóttir, María Helga Högnadóttir, Ísold Sævarsdóttir, Eir Hlesdóttir	46.03	SB	15
2	B	4	Luxembourg	Victoria Rausch, Anaïs Bauer, Sandrine Rossi, Camille Gaeng	46.18	SB	14
3	B	3	Malta	Claire Azzopardi, Alessia Cristina, Thea Parnis Coleiro, Martha Spiteri	46.99	SB	13
4	B	6	Bosnia and Herzegovina	Emina Đulić, Emina Omanović, Sara Mijanović, Ajla Reizbegović	47.12	NR	12
5	A	7	Albania	Paolo Shyle, Alesia Dauti, Alisia Ciko, Elisa Myrtollari	47.73	SB	11
6	A	4	San Marino	Rebecca Guidi, Greta San Martini, Noemi Cola, Alessandra Gasparelli	47.81	SB	10
7	B	7	Moldova	Iana Garaeva, Tatiana Contrebuț, Mădălina Culea, Iuliana Dabija	48.37	SB	9
8	A	6	North Macedonia	Eva Mitevska, Sara Dimitrioski, Melisa Dimitrioski, Natura Malo	48.66	SB	8
9	B	2	Georgia	Lizi Mugalashvili, Ani Mamatsashvili, Ana Sokhadze, Lika Kharchilava	48.73	SB	7
10	A	3	Montenegro	Amra Hubanić, Mare Jablan, Iva Djoković, Andjela Drobnjak	49.01 (.002)	NR	6
11	A	5	Armenia	Yana Sargsyan, Marieta Minasyan, Gayane Chiloyan, Marianna Baghyan	49.01 (.005)	SB	5
12	A	8	Kosovo	Medina Kutleshi, Vesa Jusufi, Medina Fejza, Emine Jenuzi	50.26	SB	4
13	B	1	Andorra	Aroa Carballo, Noa Godoy, Duna Viñals, Elena Muñoz Collado	50.52	SB	3
—	A	2	Liechtenstein	Fiona Matt, Elena Lussi, Athina Roth, Annmarie Kindle	DQ		0
—	B	8	Azerbaijan	Safiya Karimova, Ilaha Guliyeva, Lamiya Valiyeva, Farida Rzayeva	DQ		0

=== High jump ===
Place	Group	Athlete	Nation	1.25	1.30	1.35	1.40	1.45	1.50	1.55	1.60	1.65	1.69	1.73	1.76	1.79	1.81	1.83	1.85	1.88	Result	Notes	Points
1	A	Marija Vuković	Montenegro	–	–	–	–	–	–	–	–	–	–	–	o	–	xo	–	o	xxx	1.85		15
2	A	Birta María Haraldsdóttir	Iceland	–	–	–	–	–	–	–	–	–	–	o	xo	–	o	–	xxx		1.81	=SB	14
3	A	Sara Lučić	Bosnia and Herzegovina	–	–	–	–	–	–	–	–	o	xo	o	xo	o	xxx				1.79	SB	13
4	A	Julie Craenen	Luxembourg	–	–	–	–	–	–	o	o	o	xxo	xx							1.69		12
5	A	Andriana Talpa	Moldova	–	–	–	–	o	o	o	o	o	xxx								1.65		11
6	A	Mihaela Lazarovska	North Macedonia	–	–	–	–	–	o	o	xo	xxx									1.60	=SB	9.5
6	A	Lucia Casali	San Marino	–	–	–	–	–	o	o	xo	xxx									1.60	=SB	9.5
8	B	Noa Godoy	Andorra	–	–	o	–	o	xo	o	xo	xx									1.60	=SB	8
9	B	Elina Lussi	Liechtenstein	–	–	–	–	xo	o	xx											1.50		7
10	B	Rexhina Berami	Albania	–	–	–	o	o	xxo	xx											1.50	SB	6
11	B	Lizi Mugalashvili	Georgia	o	o	o	o	xo	xxo	x											1.50	SB	5
12	B	Zahra Bayramova	Azerbaijan	o	o	o	xo	o	xxx												1.45		3.5
12	B	Zaida Pace	Malta	o	o	o	xo	o	xxx												1.45	SB	3.5
14	B	Marieta Minasyan	Armenia	o	o	o	o	xxx													1.40	SB	2

=== Pole vault ===
Place	Athlete	Nation	2.00	2.20	2.40	2.60	2.80	3.00	3.15	3.30	3.45	3.55	3.60	3.65	3.85	Result	Notes	Points
1	Karen Sif Ársælsdóttir	Iceland	–	–	–	–	–	–	–	o	–	o	–	–	xxx	3.55		15
2	Martina Muraccini	San Marino	–	–	–	–	–	o	o	xo	o	xxx				3.45		14
3	Sana Grillo	Malta	–	–	–	–	–	–	o	o	xxx					3.30		13
4	Amina Cifrić	Bosnia and Herzegovina	–	–	–	–	–	xo	xxx							3.00		12
5	Lara Marx	Luxembourg	–	–	–	–	xo	xo	xxx							3.00	SB	11
6	Anastasia Roşca	Moldova	–	–	–	o	o	xxo	xx							3.00	PB	10
7	Lizi Mugalashvili	Georgia	o	o	xxo	xx										2.40	SB	9
8	Zahra Bayramova	Azerbaijan	xo	xxx												2.00	SB	8

=== Long jump ===
Place	Athlete	Nation	#1	#2	#3	#4	#5	#6	Result	Notes	Points
1	Rachela Pace	Malta	6.34	6.09	6.39	6.26	6.25	6.21	6.39		15
2	Birna Kristín Kristjánsdóttir	Iceland	6.03	x	6.31	6.09	x	x	6.31		14
3	Mari Dzagnidze	Georgia	6.21	x	6.26	6.27	x	6.30	6.30	PB	13
4	Anastasia Senchiv	Moldova	5.86	5.74	6.17	6.04	6.07	6.17	6.17	PB	12
5	Yana Sargsyan	Armenia	5.59	5.80	5.99	6.01	x		6.01	SB	11
6	Emina Omanović	Bosnia and Herzegovina	5.73	5.72	5.98	x	5.85		5.98		10
7	Yekaterina Sariyeva	Azerbaijan	5.59	3.99	5.35	x	–		5.59		9
8	Anđela Đuranović	Montenegro	5.59	x	x	x	x		5.59		8
9	Lina Iseni	North Macedonia	4.84	5.34	5.41				5.41	PB	7
10	Soraya de Sousa Moreira	Luxembourg	5.36	x	x				5.36		6
11	Greta San Martini	San Marino	5.31	5.31	3.34				5.31		5
12	Noa Godoy	Andorra	4.71	5.09	4.80				5.09		4
13	Uibi Ahmet	Albania	x	5.08	x				5.08	SB	3
14	Athina Roth	Liechtenstein	4.85	4.84	4.93				4.93	SB	2
15	Emine Jenuzi	Kosovo	4.31	4.41	4.50				4.50	SB	1

=== Triple jump ===
Place	Athlete	Nation	#1	#2	#3	#4	#5	#6	Result	Notes	Points
1	Yekaterina Sariyeva	Azerbaijan	x	x	13.27	13.09	13.87	13.38	13.87	SB	15
2	Irma Gunnarsdóttir	Iceland	x	13.44	x	13.43	13.72	13.55	13.72	NR	14
3	Rachela Pace	Malta	13.29	x	x	12.95	13.39	x	13.39		13
4	Mari Dzagnidze	Georgia	12.60	12.93	12.67	12.96	x	12.94	12.96	SB	12
5	Yana Sargsyan	Armenia	12.70	x	x	12.86	12.49		12.86	SB	11
6	Iuliana Dabija	Moldova	11.85	x	x	12.55	x		12.55		10
7	Melody N'Da Vittoria Koffi	Luxembourg	12.54	x	12.28	x	x		12.54	NR	9
8	Lamija Tahmaz	Bosnia and Herzegovina	11.58	11.42	11.59	11.44	10.88		11.59		8
9	Anđela Đuranović	Montenegro	11.56	11.35	11.52				11.56		7
10	Lina Iseni	North Macedonia	11.29	x	11.35				11.35		6
11	Greta San Martini	San Marino	10.88	x	x				10.88		5
12	Valmire Jashari	Kosovo	10.02	10.49	9.35				10.49	SB	4
13	Uibi Ahmet	Albania	x	10.32	10.33				10.33	SB	3
14	Elena Muñoz Collado	Andorra	9.65	9.66	9.70				9.70	SB	2

=== Shot put ===
Place	Athlete	Nation	#1	#2	#3	#4	#5	#6	Result	Notes	Points
1	Erna Sóley Gunnarsdóttir	Iceland	15.37	15.21	16.05	x	x	x	16.05		15
2	Alexandra Emilianov	Moldova	x	15.06	15.80	x	r		15.80	SB	14
3	Sopiko Shatirishvili	Georgia	15.04	14.95	14.55	14.51	14.92	14.37	15.04		13
4	Vesna Kljajević	Montenegro	13.74	14.45	14.50	x	14.01	x	14.50		12
5	Stéphanie Krumlovsky	Luxembourg	x	13.90	13.12	14.20	14.40		14.40		11
6	Jule Insinna	Liechtenstein	x	10.80	12.56	12.51	12.96		12.96		10
7	Sakina Hajizada	Azerbaijan	12.11	11.50	12.00	12.33	11.72		12.33		9
8	Dženisa Gusinac	Bosnia and Herzegovina	11.97	12.04	11.53	11.38	11.67		12.04		8
9	Mireya Cassar	Malta	10.41	10.52	11.38				11.38	SB	7
10	Jumna Fetahu	North Macedonia	9.99	11.12	x				11.12	SB	6
11	Zhanna Shahnazaryan	Armenia	9.97	10.18	10.40				10.40	SB	5
12	Medina Kutleshi	Kosovo	8.62	9.28	9.39				9.39	SB	4
13	Asia Sina	Albania	7.93	8.88	9.16				9.16	SB	3
14	Sofia Bucci	San Marino	6.58	7.00	6.81				7.00	SB	2
15	Elena Muñoz Collado	Andorra	5.99	4.58	6.02				6.02		1

=== Discus throw ===
Place	Athlete	Nation	#1	#2	#3	#4	#5	#6	Result	Notes	Points
1	Alexandra Emilianov	Moldova	59.84	59.79	61.13	61.84	60.78	x	61.84	SB	15
2	Hera Christensen	Iceland	52.99	52.48	49.72	50.72	53.80	x	53.80	PB	14
3	Jule Insinna	Liechtenstein	49.94	45.43	x	x	48.47	x	49.94	NR	13
4	Dženisa Gusinac	Bosnia and Herzegovina	36.31	39.16	43.23	44.92	x	x	44.92	PB	12
5	Stéphanie Krumlovsky	Luxembourg	44.06	43.48	x	41.67	x		44.06		11
6	Ketevan Mamaladze	Georgia	34.92	39.49	39.38	x	x		39.49		10
7	Tea Aleksovska	North Macedonia	34.21	34.31	33.66	30.79	29.90		34.31		9
8	Sakina Hajizada	Azerbaijan	30.34	34.20	31.92	x	x		34.20		8
9	Anđelina Lašić	Montenegro	29.12	x	28.47				29.12	SB	7
10	Antonella Chouhal	Malta	26.41	x	27.89				27.89	SB	6
11	Mariam Mkrtchyan	Armenia	x	22.82	23.14				23.14	SB	5
12	Maria Morató Cañabate	Andorra	19.37	20.44	22.26				22.26	SB	4
13	Medina Kutleshi	Kosovo	x	20.62	r				20.62	SB	3
14	Sarah Nilo Gomes	San Marino	16.29	14.23	15.87				16.29	SB	2

=== Hammer throw ===
Place	Athlete	Nation	#1	#2	#3	#4	#5	#6	Result	Notes	Points
1	Yipsi Moreno	Albania	66.29	63.08	66.81	66.28	65.87	67.96	67.96	NR	15
2	Guðrún Karítas Hallgrímsdóttir	Iceland	58.61	57.88	x	66.04	61.03	x	66.04		14
3	Sofia Snäll	Luxembourg	55.29	x	57.45	x	51.69	53.61	57.43		13
4	Ajla Bašić	Bosnia and Herzegovina	53.03	x	56.32	x	54.70	52.54	56.32	SB	12
5	Alina Andrițchi	Moldova	48.32	49.38	48.45	x	x		49.38		11
6	Mireya Cassar	Malta	43.31	48.21	46.43	48.55	47.41		48.55		10
7	Zhanna Shahnazaryan	Armenia	46.03	48.34	48.38	46.56	46.97		48.38	SB	9
8	Tea Aleksovska	North Macedonia	33.32	34.80	38.47	36.56	37.42		38.47	PB	8
9	Vesna Kljajević	Montenegro	x	37.85	36.11				37.85	SB	7
10	Narmin Ismayilova	Azerbaijan	29.66	31.56	27.80				31.56	PB	6
11	Ketevan Mamaladze	Georgia	21.80	24.29	22.96				24.29	SB	5
12	Maria Morató Cañabate	Andorra	12.60	14.10	12.33				14.10	SB	4

=== Javelin throw ===
Place	Athlete	Nation	#1	#2	#3	#4	#5	#6	Result	Notes	Points
1	Arndís Diljá Óskarsdóttir	Iceland	51.60	x	x	x	x	46.89	51.60		15
2	Noémie Pleimling	Luxembourg	48.23	50.45	x	x	49.30	x	50.45		14
3	Marija Bogavac	Montenegro	49.54	49.80	48.04	48.21	49.80	48.22	49.80		13
4	Julia Rohrer	Liechtenstein	45.53	47.99	45.52	45.96	43.88	44.84	47.99		12
5	Alina Moraru	Moldova	40.45	x	38.67	36.78	40.26		40.45		11
6	Mariam Mkrtchyan	Armenia	34.52	35.41	35.93	35.14	x		35.93		10
7	Irada Aliyeva	Azerbaijan	35.32	33.71	r				35.32		9
8	Anja Stević	Bosnia and Herzegovina	29.05	33.93	30.97	x	26.31		33.93	SB	8
9	Jarita Bislimi	Kosovo	30.95	x	33.50				33.50	SB	7
10	Maria Morató Cañabate	Andorra	29.48	27.41	30.06				30.06		6
11	Asia Sina	Albania	25.85	29.22	x				29.22	PB	5
12	Mariah Grima	Malta	24.01	23.94	26.94				26.94	SB	4
13	Lizi Mugalashvili	Georgia	20.55	r					20.55	SB	3
14	Jumna Fetahu	North Macedonia	20.29	x	r				20.29	SB	2
15	Martina Muraccini	San Marino	17.04		r				17.04	SB	1

== Mixed event ==
=== 4 x 400 metres relay ===
Place	Heat	Lane	Country	Athletes	Time	Notes	Points
1	B	4	Luxembourg	Glenn Lassine, Fanny Arendt, David Friederich, Elise Romero	3:25.57	NR	15
2	B	5	Iceland	Ívar Kristinn Jasonarson, Guðbjörg Jóna Bjarnadóttir, Samundur Ólafsson, Ísold Sævarsdóttir	3:25.96	SB	14
3	B	3	Malta	Nick Bonett, Martha Spiteri, Matthew Galea Soler, Gina McNamara	3:26.79	NR	13
4	B	8	Azerbaijan	Javid Mammadov, Ilaha Guliyeva, Novruz Asadli, Lamiya Valiyeva	3:29.57	NR	12
5	B	6	Bosnia and Herzegovina	Amel Tuka, Džana Suljić, Abedin Mujezinović, Maša Garić	3:30.42	NR	11
6	A	8	Andorra	Pau Blasi, Aroa Carballo, Eloi Vilella Escolano, Duna Viñals	3:32.07	SB	10
7	A	6	Montenegro	Mihailo Roćenović, Anabela Mujovi, Nemanja Džaković, Mare Jablan	3:36.63	SB	9
8	A	3	San Marino	Francesco Molinari, Sofia Bucci, Alessandro Gasperoni, Rebecca Guidi	3:42.32	SB	8
9	B	2	Georgia	Levan Kvaratskhelia, Ana Sokhadze, Mindia Endeladze, Lika Kharchilava	3:51.76	SB	7
—	A	2	Liechtenstein	Joel Riesen, Nadine Stüber, Matthias Verling, Sienna Zobel	DQ		0
—	A	4	Albania	Stivi Kereku, Alesia Dauti, Franko Burraj, Iljana Beqiri	DQ		0
—	A	5	Armenia	Gor Harutyunyan, Yana Sargsyan, Vahe Avagyan, Meline Adamyan	DQ		0
—	A	7	North Macedonia	Mihail Petrov, Dijana Vukanovikj, Jovan Stojoski, Sara Dimitrioski	DQ		0
—	B	7	Moldova	Chirill Grigorovschii, Mădălina Culea, Ivan Galușco, Xenia Berghii	DQ		0

== See also ==
- 2025 European Athletics Team Championships First Division
- 2025 European Athletics Team Championships Second Division
