= 2027 European Athletics Team Championships =

International athletics competition

2027 European Team Championships
- Host city: Istanbul, Turkey
- Events: 37
- Dates: 25–27 June 2027 (First division); 22–24 June 2027 (Second division); 22–24 June 2027 (Third division)

The 2027 European Athletics Team Championships (ETC) are scheduled to be held in June 2027 as part of the 2027 European Games in Istanbul.

Teams from Russia and Belarus are currently banned from the European Athletics Team Championships and other European Athletics events due to the ongoing Russian invasion of Ukraine.

As in 2023, individual gold, silver and bronze medals will be awarded in addition to the medals and cup in the teams competition as part of the 2027 European Games program. The individual medals will be decided on best performances across all three divisions, and the winners and medalists in the individual events will be considered as European Games medalists, rather than Team Championships medalists - only the members of the first three teams in the First Division table receive Team Championships medals. Within the Championships, events from 100 metres to 800 metres were run in two heats, with times combined into a single table for the purposes of both points in the Team Championships and medal placings in the European Games. Stand alone team championships are held in the middle year of the European Games cycle where individual medals are not awarded.

In addition to prizes and medals, the three highest teams in the second and third divisions shall be promoted for the next edition of the championships, and the bottom three teams of the first and second division relegated.

== Teams ==
=== First Division ===
- Belgium
- Czech Republic
- France
- Germany
- Great Britain
- Greece
- Hungary
- Italy
- Netherlands
- Norway
- Poland
- Portugal
- Spain
- Slovenia
- Sweden
- Switzerland

=== Second Division ===
- Austria
- Bosnia and Herzegovina
- Croatia
- Denmark
- Estonia
- Finland
- Iceland
- Ireland
- Israel
- Lithuania
- Luxembourg
- Romania
- Serbia
- Slovakia
- Turkey
- Ukraine

=== Third Division ===
- Albania
- Andorra
- Armenia
- Azerbaijan
- Bulgaria
- Cyprus
- Georgia
- Gibraltar*
- Kosovo
- Latvia
- Liechtenstein
- Malta
- Moldova
- Monaco*
- North Macedonia
- Montenegro
- San Marino

(*) Did not participate in 2025.
