= List of Luxembourgish records in athletics =

The following are the national records in athletics in Luxembourg maintained by its national athletics federation: Fédération Luxembourgeoise d'Athlétisme (FLA).

== Outdoor ==
Key to tables: Awaiting ratification Record not kept by FLA Not ratified or later rescinded by FLA

=== Men ===
Event	Record	Athlete	Date	Meet	Place	Ref.
100 m	10.41 A NWI (heat)	Roland Bombardella	8 September 1979	Universiade	Mexico City, Mexico	
100 m	10.41 A (+0.2 m/s) (semifinal)	Roland Bombardella	8 September 1979	Universiade	Mexico City, Mexico	
100 m	10.41 (+1.7 m/s)	Daniel Abenzoar-Foulé	21 July 2006		Tomblaine, France	
100 m	10.1 h NWI	Roland Bombardella	24 June 1979		Luxembourg, Luxembourg	
200 m	20.77 (−0.5 m/s)	Roland Bombardella	22 August 1977		Stuttgart, West Germany	
300 m	34.22	Vincent Karger	8 May 2016	26. Internationales Läufermeeting	Pliezhausen, Germany	
400 m	47.4 h (Note: not recognised by IAAF)	Emile Jung	16 August 1969		Font-Romeu, France	
400 m	47.76	David Fiegen	20 August 2006		La Chaux-de-Fonds, Switzerland	
600 m	1:16.15	David Fiegen	16 May 2008	26. Internationales Läufermeeting	Pliezhausen, Germany	
800 m	1:44.81	David Fiegen	18 August 2006	Weltklasse Zürich	Zürich, Switzerland	
1000 m	2:17.51	David Fiegen	2 July 2006		Metz, France	
1500 m	3:32.86	Charles Grethen	5 August 2021	Olympic Games	Tokyo, Japan	
Mile	3:52.57	Charles Grethen	6 September 2023		Pfungstadt, Germany	
Mile (road)	3:52.77	Ruben Querinjean	19 September 2026	World Road Running Championships	Copenhagen, Denmark	
2000 m	5:05.40	Charles Grethen	9 September 2023		Diekirch, Luxembourg	
3000 m	7:43.41	Charles Grethen	8 September 2023		Trier, Germany	
5000 m	13:38.51	Justin Gloden	3 June 1983		Leuven, Belgium	
5 km (road)	13:20	Ruben Querinjean	4 April 2026	Urban Trail de Lille	Lille, France	
10,000 m	28:46.4 h	Justin Gloden	15 June 1984		Leuven, Belgium	
10 km (road)	28:25	Ruben Querinjean	16 March 2025		Lille, France	
Half hour	10134 m	Justin Gloden	7 October 1978		Ingelheim, Germany	
One hour	19970 m	Justin Gloden	7 August 1985		Diekirch, Luxembourg	
20,000 m (track)	1:00:04.6	Justin Gloden	7 August 1985		Diekirch, Luxembourg	
Half marathon	1:04:05	Justin Gloden	26 June 1985		Trier, West Germany	
25 km (road)	1:16:26	Justin Gloden	3 May 1987	BIG 25	Berlin, West Germany	
30 km (road)	1:36:12	Marc Agosta	13 May 1985		Frankfurt, West Germany	
Marathon	2:14:03	Justin Gloden	19 May 1985		Frankfurt, West Germany	
110 m hurdles	13.79 (+1.3 m/s)	François Grailet	9 July 2023		Luxembourg, Luxembourg	
400 m hurdles	50.94	Jacques Frisch	30 June 2013		Chambéry, France	
2000 m steeplechase	5:27.74	Ruben Querinjean	5 May 2024	Internationales Läufermeeting	Pliezhausen, Germany	
3000 m steeplechase	8:05.36	Ruben Querinjean	23 August 2026	Kamila Skolimowska Memorial	Chorzów, Poland	
High jump	2.22 m	Raymond Conzemius	3 September 1995		Dudelange, Luxembourg	
Pole vault	5.40 m	Fabian Mores	15 May 2005		Innsbruck, Austria	
Long jump	7.58 m (±0.0 m/s) (Note: wind measurement by World Athletics source, +0.4 m/s by FLA source)	François Grailet	24 June 2017	European Team Championships	Marsa, Malta	
Triple jump	15.38 m NWI	Guy Kemp	21 July 1990		Diekirch, Luxembourg	
Shot put	22.22 m	Bob Bertemes	4 August 2019	Mémorial J.-P. Kops & J.-M. Reuter	Luxembourg, Luxembourg	
Discus throw	61.06 m	Bob Bertemes	15 September 2019		Dudelange, Luxembourg	
Hammer throw	70.15 m	Jean-Charles De Ridder	30 April 2000		Zoufftgen, France	
Javelin throw	75.39 m	Antoine Wagner	17 March 2013	13th European Cup Winter Throwing	Castellón, Spain	
Weight throw	18.27 m	Steve Weiwert	18 July 2026	Sommerwerfen Meet	Cessange, Luxembourg	
Decathlon	7484 pts	Marc Kemp	22–23 June 1985		Brussels, Belgium	
Decathlon	100m (wind) / Long jump (wind) / Shot put / High jump / 400m / 110m H (wind) / Discus / Pole vault / Javelin / 1500m; 11.06 / 7.37 m / 12.45 m / 1.96 m / 50.59 / 15.57 / 36.82 m / 4.70 m / 56.88 m / 4:44.42					
5000 m walk (track)	20:43.2	Marco Sowa	9 May 1992		Sittard, Netherlands	
10,000 m walk (track)	42:49.2 h	Marco Sowa	20 April 1988		Weert, Netherlands	
One hour walk (track)	13710 m	Marco Sowa	24 August 1991		Esch-sur-Alzette, Luxembourg	
20,000 m walk (track)	1:28:49.5	Marco Sowa	20 May 1992		Weert, Netherlands	
20 km walk (road)	1:26:13	Lucien Faber	13 April 1980		Ruse, Bulgaria	
50,000 m walk (track)	4:33:54.2	Tun Kunnert	22 June 1980		Luxembourg, Luxembourg	
50 km walk (road)	4:10:05	Lucien Faber	15 April 1984		Bad Krozingen, West Germany	
100 km walk (road)	9:48:58	Fred Schwickert			Bar-le-Duc, France	
3 × 3000 m race walk relay (track)	40:35.3 h	CA Belvaux; Marius Wians; René Colombo; Lucien Faber	6 September 1983		Luxembourg, Luxembourg	
4 × 5000 m race walk relay (track)	1:36:18.4	CA Belvaux; René Colombo; Marius Wians; Serge Bernardy; Josef Rekad	6 September 1983		Luxembourg, Luxembourg	
4 × 100 m relay	40.76	Luxembourg; Alan Jéhanno; David Wallig; Jim Kaell; Luc Dostert	26 July 2026	Luxembourg Championships	Luxembourg, Luxembourg	
4 × 200 m relay	1:26.38	Luxembourg; Tim Wiegandt; Christian Kemp; Paul Zens; Thierry Eischen	9 August 1997		Diekirch, Luxembourg	
4 × 400 m relay	3:13.70	Luxembourg; Glenn Lassine; Enguerran Bossicard; David Friederich; Mathis Espagnet	31 May 2025	Games of the Small States of Europe	Andorra la Vella, Andorra	
4 × 800 m relay	7:44.23	Spora; Philippe Faber; Thierry Hild; Christian Thielen; Carlos Calvo	5 September 1999		Luxembourg, Luxembourg	
3 × 1000 m relay	7:17.33	Fola; Jimmy Keiffer; Mike Schumacher; David Fiegen	1 September 2006		Esch-sur-Alzette, Luxembourg	
4 × 1500 m relay	16:01.9 h	Luxembourg; Georges Wiltgen; Charles Decker; Jean-Pierre Bichler; Raymond Haupert	30 August 1979		Koblenz, Germany	

=== Women ===
Event	Record	Athlete	Date	Meet	Place	Ref.
100 m	11.00 (+2.0 m/s)	Patrizia van der Weken	9 June 2024	European Championships	Rome, Italy	
200 m	23.19 (+1.0 m/s)	Patrizia van der Weken	22 June 2023	European Team Championships	Chorzów, Poland	
300 m	39.72	Kim Reuland	19 July 2014		Saint-Mard, Belgium	
400 m	52.84	Fanny Arendt	1 May 2025	Texas Tech Corky/Crofoot Shootout	Lubbock, United States	
600 m	1:25.99	Fanny Arendt	19 July 2025	Laafmeeting an Mémorial Benny Michel	Diekirch, Luxembourg	
800 m	2:00.35	Charline Mathias	21 July 2018	Abendmeeting	Heusden-Zolder, Belgium	
1000 m	2:40.09	Charline Mathias	13 May 2018	Internationales Läufermeeting	Pliezhausen, Germany	
1500 m	4:05.58	Vera Bertemes-Hoffmann	5 July 2025	Czesław Cybulski Memorial	Poznań, Poland	
Mile	4:32.68	Vera Hoffmann	24 August 2024	The Monument Mile Classic	Stirling, United Kingdom	
Mile (road)	4:34.91 Wo (Note: by World Athletics source; 4:34.67 by FLA source, probably a typo)	Vera Bertemes-Hoffmann	6 September 2026	New Balance Kö Meile	Düsseldorf, Germany	
3000 m	9:12.27 Mx (Note: Federation accepts records in mixed races)	Vera Hoffmann	4 July 2020		Regensburg, Germany	
3000 m	9:12.67	Danièle Kaber	6 August 1986		Koblenz, Germany	
5000 m	15:42.38	Danièle Kaber	5 September 1986	Memorial Van Damme	Brussels, Belgium	
10,000 m	32:16.97	Danièle Kaber	30 August 1986		Stuttgart, West Germany	
10 km (road)	32:45 (Note: by World Athletics source; 32.43 by FLA source, probably a typo)	Linda Krombach	29 March 2026	10km d'Aix-les-Bains	Aix-les-Bains, France	
Half marathon	1:10:56	Danièle Kaber	21 September 1986		Grevenmacher, Luxembourg	
25 km (road)	1:26:50+	Danièle Kaber	23 September 1988	Olympic Games	Seoul, South Korea	
30 km (road)	1:44:45+	Danièle Kaber	23 September 1988	Olympic Games	Seoul, South Korea	
Marathon	2:29:23	Danièle Kaber	23 September 1988	Olympic Games	Seoul, South Korea	
100 m hurdles	13.09 (+1.6 m/s)	Victoria Rausch	26 July 2025	CAS Meeting International	Schifflange, Luxembourg	
400 m hurdles	58.54	Uyana Granger	6 August 2026	World U20 Championships	Eugene, United States	
3000 m steeplechase	10:40.83	Maxine Libens-Thein	29 March 2026	UBC Open	Vancouver, United States	
High jump	1.85 m	Elodie Tshilumba	9 June 2017	Meeting National	Pierre-Benite, France	
Pole vault	4.30 m	Gina Reuland	2 June 2015	Games of the Small States of Europe	Reykjavík, Iceland	
Long jump	6.01 m NWI	Claudia Czerwonka	10 June 2000		Siegen, Germany	
Triple jump	12.54 m (+1.1 m/s)	Melody Koffi	25 June 2025	European Team Championships	Maribor, Slovenia	
Shot put	15.42 m	Stéphanie Krumlovsky	7 June 2026	Interclubs Hommes & Dames	Ettelbruck, Luxembourg	
Discus throw	45.45 m	Stéphanie Krumlovsky	15 August 2022		Dachau, Germany	
Hammer throw	55.58 m	Sofia Snäll	26 April 2025	Meeting André Joannes	Saint-Mard, Belgium	
Javelin throw	57.46 m	Noémie Pleimling	6 September 2020		Dudelange, Luxembourg	
Weight throw	16.48 m	Nadine Kremer	21 April 2025	XXXIII Osterwerfen	Trier, Germany	
Heptathlon	5036 pts	Mandy Charlet	10–11 June 2006		Amiens, France	
Heptathlon	100m H (wind) / High jump / Shot put / 200m (wind) / Long jump (wind) / Javelin / 800m; 14.77 / 1.54 m / 11.24 m / 26.40 / 5.44 m / 37.28 m / 2:19.82					
Heptathlon	5143 pts	Mirjam Hess	14–15 August 2004		Wil, Switzerland	
Heptathlon	100m H (wind) / High jump / Shot put / 200m (wind) / Long jump (wind) / Javelin / 800m					
Heptathlon	5104 pts	Mirjam Hess	31 July – 1 August 2004		Mérignac, France	
Heptathlon	100m H (wind) / High jump / Shot put / 200m (wind) / Long jump (wind) / Javelin / 800m; 14.29 / 1.55 m / 10.88 m / 24.42 / 5.53 m / 36.65 m / 2:33.65					
20 km walk (road)						
50 km walk (road)						
4 × 100 m relay	45.34	Luxembourg; Victoria Rausch; Patrizia van der Weken; Sandrine Rossi; Anaïs Bauer	26 June 2022		Luxembourg, Luxembourg	
4 × 400 m relay	3:44.13	Luxembourg; Tamara Krumlovsky; Charline Mathias; Martine Nobili; Kim Reuland	22 June 2015	European Games	Baku, Azerbaijan	
3 × 800 m relay	6:44.11	Celtic; Tania Sansissi; Jenny Gloden; Martine Mellina	30 June 2012		Esch-sur-Alzette, Luxembourg	

=== Mixed ===
Event	Record	Athlete	Date	Meet	Place	Ref.
4 × 400 m relay	3:25.57	Luxembourg; Glenn Lassine; Fanny Arendt; David Friederich; Elise Romero	25 June 2025	European Team Championships	Maribor, Slovenia	

== Indoor ==
=== Men ===
Event	Record	Athlete	Date	Meet	Place	Ref.
60 m	6.76	Daniel Abenzoar-Foulé	10 March 2006	World Championships	Moscow, Russia	
200 m	21.12	Daniel Abenzoar-Foulé	27 January 2006	PEDUS Indoor Meeting	Kirchberg, Luxembourg	
300 m	34.21	Olivier Juncker	16 December 2023		Kirchberg, Luxembourg	
400 m	47.49 (Note: outdoor mark ratified as absolute record)	Vincent Karger	24 January 2015	Championnats Grande Région plus	Kirchberg, Luxembourg	
800 m	1:47.44	David Fiegen	3 March 2002	European Championships	Vienna, Austria	
1000 m	2:22.12	David Fiegen	24 January 2004		Luxembourg, Luxembourg	
1500 m	3:35.99+	Charles Grethen	3 February 2024	BU Bruce Lehane Scarlet and White Invitational	Boston, United States	
Mile	3:52.67	Charles Grethen	3 February 2024	BU Bruce Lehane Scarlet and White Invitational	Boston, United States	
2000 m	5:01.89	Charles Grethen	10 February 2024	Meeting Hauts-de-France Pas-de-Calais	Liévin, France	
3000 m	7:40.64	Ruben Querinjean	8 February 2026	Meeting Metz Moselle Athlelor	Metz, France	
5000 m	14:27.18	Bob Bertemes	16 December 2023		Kirchberg, Luxembourg	
60 m hurdles	7.73	François Grailet	26 February 2022		Louvain-la-Neuve, Belgium	
High jump	2.17 m	Raymond Conzemius	26 March 1988		Dortmund, West Germany	
Pole vault	5.40 m (Note: outdoor mark ratified as absolute record)	Fabian Mores	21 January 2006		Innsbruck, Austria	
Long jump	7.68 m (Note: outdoor mark ratified as absolute record)	Romain Lambert	14 January 2017		Kirchberg, Luxembourg	
Triple jump	15.28 m	Andrei Mikhalkevitch	23 February 2008		Luxembourg, Luxembourg	
Shot put	21.93 m	Bob Bertemes	19 February 2023	Luxembourg Championships	Kirchberg, Luxembourg	
Weight throw	17.66 m	Steve Weiwert	28 January 2024		Sittard, Netherlands	
Heptathlon	5382 pts	Bernard Felten	2–3 March 1996		Ludwigshafen, Germany	
Heptathlon	60m / Long jump / Shot put / High jump / 60m H / Pole vault / 1000m; 7.17 / 7.01 m / 10.78 m / 1.88 m / 8.37 / 5.00 m / 2:55.11					
5000 m walk	20:56.01 (Note: not ratified by FLA but recognized by World Athletics)	Marco Sowa	25 January 1992		Limburg, Germany	
4 × 200 m relay	1:28.51	Luxembourg; Marc Debanck; Patrick Hansen; Festus Geraldo; Yoann Bebon	11 February 2007		Saarbrücken, Germany	
4 × 400 m relay	3:18.59	CSL Club Team; Vincent Kalmes; Tom Scholer; Charel Grethen; Jacques Frisch	21 December 2012	Lafmeeting	Kirchberg, Luxembourg	

=== Women ===
Event	Record	Athlete	Date	Meet	Place	Ref.
50 m	6.12+	Patrizia van der Weken	4 February 2025	Czech Indoor Gala	Ostrava, Czech Republic	
60 m	7.01	Patrizia van der Weken	22 February 2026	Copernicus Cup	Toruń, Poland	
200 m	23.17	Patrizia van der Weken	19 January 2025	CMCM Meeting	Kirchberg, Luxembourg	
300 m	39.55	Patrizia van der Weken	17 December 2021		Kirchberg, Luxembourg	
400 m	53.08	Fanny Arendt	10 January 2026	Indoor Regio 3	Kirchberg, Luxembourg	
600 m	1:26.04	Charline Mathias	4 January 2026	Régio 2	Kirchberg, Luxembourg	
800 m	2:00.83	Fanny Arendt	18 January 2026	CMCM Meeting	Kirchberg, Luxembourg	
1000 m	2:45.39	Charline Mathias	17 December 2021		Kirchberg, Luxembourg	
1500 m	4:08.73	Vera Hoffmann	3 March 2023	European Championships	Istanbul, Turkey	
Mile	4:32.05	Vera Hoffmann	4 February 2023		Boston, United States	
3000 m	9:07.54	Vera Hoffmann	23 February 2025	Luxembourgish Championships	Kirchberg, Luxembourg	
5000 m	15:59.74	Vera Hoffmann	16 December 2023		Kirchberg, Luxembourg	
60 m hurdles	8.08	Victoria Rausch	18 January 2026	CMCM Meeting	Kirchberg, Luxembourg	
400 m hurdles	1:02.30	Kim Reulland	12 February 2011		Eaubonne, France	
High jump	1.84 m	Elodie Tshilumba	7 February 2015	Vectis Meeting	Kirchberg, Luxembourg	
Pole vault	4.30 m (Note: outdoor mark ratified as absolute record)	Gina Reuland	6 March 2015	European Championships	Prague, Czech Republic	
Long jump	5.95 m	Laurence Jones	19 January 2014		Kirchberg, Luxembourg	
Triple jump	12.36 m	Melody Koffi	23 February 2025	Luxembourgish Championships	Kirchberg, Luxembourg	
Shot put	15.24 m (Note: outdoor mark ratified as absolute record)	Stéphanie Krumlovsky	23 February 2025	Luxembourgish Championships	Kirchberg, Luxembourg	
Pentathlon	3654 pts	Mandy Charlet	25 February 2007		Magglingen, Switzerland	
Pentathlon	60m H / High jump / Shot put / Long jump / 800m; 9.15 / 1.54 m / 11.66 m / 5.37 m / 2:21.04					
3000 m walk						
4 × 200 m relay	1:41.85	Luxembourg; Sandra Frisch; Kim Schartz; Carole Frisch; Kim Reuland	11 February 2007		Saarbrücken, Germany	
4 × 400 m relay	3:56.27	Anaïs Bauer; Laurence Jones; Frédérique Hansen; Charline Mathias	21 December 2012	Lafmeeting	Kirchberg, Luxembourg	
