= Eugene Amo-Dadzie =

British athlete

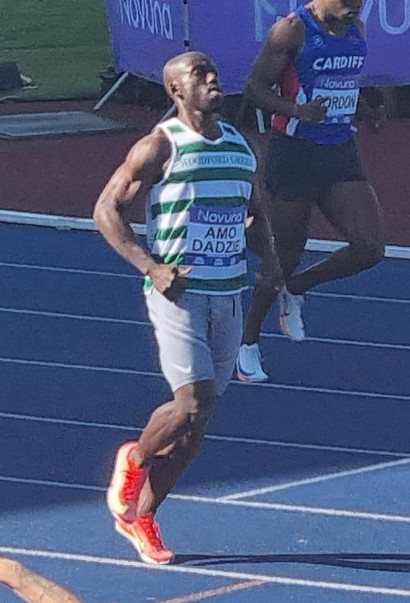
- 2025 UK Athletics Championships

Personal information
- Nationality: British (English)
- Born: 22 June 1992 (age 34) Rainham, London, England

Sport
- Sport: Athletics
- Event: sprint
- Club: Woodford Green with Essex Ladies

Achievements and titles
- Personal bests: 60 m: 6.59 (2025); 100 m: 9.87 (2025); 200 m: 21.79 (2025)

Eugene Amo-Dadzie (born 22 June 1992) is a British athlete who competes as a sprinter. He was a bronze medalist over 60 metres at the 2023 British Indoor Athletics Championships and the 2023 British Athletics Championships.

== Biography ==
=== Late starter ===
Amo-Dadzie did not start competing until he was twenty-six years-old, by which time he was a qualified chartered accountant. He competed at the British Athletics Championships for the first time in 2019, finishing fifth in his semi-final.

A Woodford Green athlete, Amo-Dadzie ran a new personal best time over 100m of 10.20 seconds to finish second at the 2021 British Athletics Championships in Bedford. In August 2022 he lowered his 100m personal best to 10.05 in Stratford. This placed him third over 100m by fastest time by UK athletes in 2022.

=== First British selection ===
In February 2023 he finished third behind Reece Prescod and Jeremiah Azu at the British Indoor Athletics Championships 60m race, held in Birmingham. They were subsequently selected for the Great Britain squad for the 2023 European Athletics Indoor Championships held at the Ataköy Athletics Arena in Istanbul. He qualified for the semi-finals of the 60m on his major championships debut.

=== Breaking the ten-second barrier ===
On 16 June 2023 he clocked 9.93 seconds for the 100m at a meeting in Graz, Austria to break the 10-second barrier for the first time. In July 2023, competing at the British Championships in Manchester, he reached the final in the 100m and finished third overall.

He was chosen to represent Great Britain at the 2023 World Athletics Championships in Budapest in August 2023, to make his world championship debut at the age of 31 He reached the semi-finals of the 100 metres. Later that year he was granted UK Sport's national lottery funded world class programme for the first time.

In April 2024, he was selected as part of the British team for the 2024 World Athletics Relays in Nassau, Bahamas.

He was named in the British team for the 2025 World Athletics Relays in Guangzhou. He ran in the men's 4 x 100 metres relay, alongside Nethaneel Mitchell-Blake, Jona Efoloko and Romell Glave as the British quartet won their heat to qualify for the final and secure a place for Britain at the 2025 World Championships. He won the 100 metres at the 2025 European Athletics Team Championships in Madrid in June 2025. At the championships he also anchored the British men's 4 x 100 metres team to a third-place finish. On 2 August, he placed fourth in the final of the 100 metres at the 2025 UK Athletics Championships in Birmingham in 10.04 seconds.

On 30 August, he tied with Linford Christie in second place on the British all-time list and fifth on the all-time European list after running 9.87 seconds (+2.0) for the 100 metres in Lee Valley. In September 2025, he competed in the men's 4 x 100 metres at the 2025 World Championships in Tokyo, Japan.

Competing on the World Athletics Indoor Tour in Madrid on 6 February 2026, Amo-Dadzie equalled his 60m personal best of 6.59 seconds. On 20 June, he qualified for the 100 metres final at the 2026 UK Athletics Championships, placing sixth overall.

== Personal life ==
From Rainham, Amo-Dadzie said he felt a responsibility to speak out to encourage BAME people to consider taking the COVID-19 vaccine in order to quell concerns they may have. Eugene is married with children. His parents are of Ghanaian heritage and his mother worked as a social carer and his father worked on the London Underground. He has two sisters. After university he began working in accounting; as of 2023 he was working as a senior accountant for a subsidiary of Berkeley Group, St George plc.
