= Vera Bertemes-Hoffmann =

Luxembourgish middle-distance runner

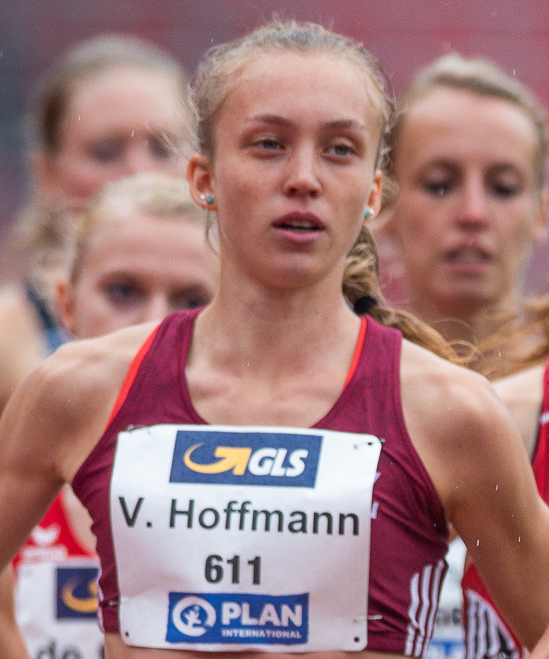

Personal information
- Nationality: Luxembourgish
- Born: Vera Hoffmann; 2 November 1996 (age 29)

Sport
- Sport: Athletics
- Event: Middle-distance running

Achievements and titles
- Personal bests: 800m: 2:02.69 (2025); 1500m: 4:05.58 (2025) NR; Mile: 4:32.05 (2023) NR; 3000m: 8:48.84 (2025) NR; 5000m: 15:29.06 (2025) NR; Indoor; 800m: 2:03.04 (2024); 1500m: 4:08.73 (2023) NR; Mile: 4:32.05 (2023) NR; 3000m: 9:04.66 (2026) NR; 5000m: 16:03.51 (2026) NR; Road; Mile: 4:34.00 (2023); 5k: 16:10 (2026); 10k: 34:23 (2025)

Vera Bertemes- Hoffmann (born 2 November 1996) is a track and field athlete from Luxembourg who competes as a middle-distance runner. She is a multiple-time national record holder and national champion.

== Biography ==
A dual-citizen of Germany and Luxembourg, she ran for ASV Cologne. She made her international debut at the 2019 European Athletics Indoor Championships in Glasgow.

In August 2019, she finished second at the 2019 European Athletics Team Championships second division 1500 metres event in Croatia.

In February 2023, Hoffmann won three events at the Luxembourg national championships, winning titles over 800, 1500 and 3000 m. In March 2023, Hoffmann finished eighth in the 2023 European Athletics Indoor Championships – Women's 1500 metres in Istanbul. In doing so, she became the first athlete from Luxembourg to advance to a European indoor final in any event.

In June 2023, she finished second at the 2023 European Athletics Team Championships second division 1500 metres event in Silesia. Hoffmann won a silver medal at the 2023 Summer World University Games in the 1500 metres in August 2023. Hoffmann competed at the 2023 World Athletics Championships in Budapest in the 1500 metres and recorded a time of 4:09.7676, coming within three seconds of surpassing her own national record.

She was selected for the 2024 World Athletics Indoor Championships in Glasgow for the women's 1500 metres where she ran a season's best time of 4:15.52. She competed in the 1500 metres at the 2024 Summer Olympics in Paris.

In July 2025, Bertemes-Hoffmann set a new 3000 metres national record for Luxembourg of 8:48.84 in Marseille. In September 2025, she competed over 1500 metres at the 2025 World Championships in Tokyo, Japan, without advancing to the semi-finals.

On 24 January, she set a new indoor national record over 5000 metres in Lyon, running 16:03.51. In March, she competed in the 1500 m at the 2026 World Athletics Indoor Championships in Toruń, Poland. In August, she competed at the 2026 European Athletics Championships in Birmingham, England, in the 1500 metres.
