= Andreas Trajkovski =

Danish long jumper

Personal information
- Born: Andreas Trajkovski Sørensen; March 18, 1993 (age 33) Copenhagen, Denmark
- Parent: Christian Trajkovski (father)

Sport
- Country: Denmark
- Sport: Track and field
- Event: Long jump

Achievements and titles
- Personal best: 7.91m (2023)

Andreas Trajkovski Sørensen (born 18 March 1993 in Copenhagen) is a Macedonian-Danish long jumper.

Trajkovski represented Denmark until February 2022 when World Athletics accepted his transfer of allegiance to North Macedonia. His father, Christian Trajkovski, is of Macedonian origin and was a Danish national champion of 100m.

In 2012 he jumped 7.82m (-0.4), Danish Junior record at Estadio Olímpico, Barcelona (2012). He has established a new national record on 4 × 100 m with Frederick Schou-Nielsen, Tazana Kamanga-Dyrbak and Kojo Musah, with 39.61, in Meeting de Paris, 24 August 2019.

Trajkovski won one title at European Team Championships with he shares the national record of the 4 × 100 m Relay. In long jump, his personal best is 7.91m (Macedonian record) which he did in 2023.

He competed for Iowa Western Reivers and Arkansas Razorbacks.
