= Lika Kharchilava =

Georgian athlete

Personal information
- Nationality: Georgia
- Born: August 4, 2000 (age 25)

Sport
- Sport: Track and Field
- Event(s): 100 metres, 200 metres

Lika Kharchilava (Georgian: ლიკა ხარჩილავა; born 4 August 2000) is a Georgian sprinter. In 2021, she was the Georgian national champion in both the 100 and 200 metres. Later that year she finished in 5th in the 200 metres final at the Balkan Athletics Championships. She will compete at the 2024 Summer Olympics in Paris in the 100 metres. She holds personal bests of 12.16 and 25.44 in the 100 and 200 metres, respectively.
