= Lucien Faber =

Luxembourgish racewalker

Personal information
- Nationality: Luxembourgish
- Born: 29 March 1952 (age 73)

Sport
- Sport: Athletics
- Event: Racewalking

Lucien Faber (born 29 March 1952) is a Luxembourgish racewalker. He competed in the men's 20 kilometres walk at the 1976 Summer Olympics and the 1980 Summer Olympics.
