= European Athletics Team Championships =

International athletics competition

- Status: active
- Genre: sports event
- Frequency: annual / biannual
- Location: various
- Inaugurated: 2009
- Organiser: European Athletic Association
- Website: www.european-athletics.com
- 2025

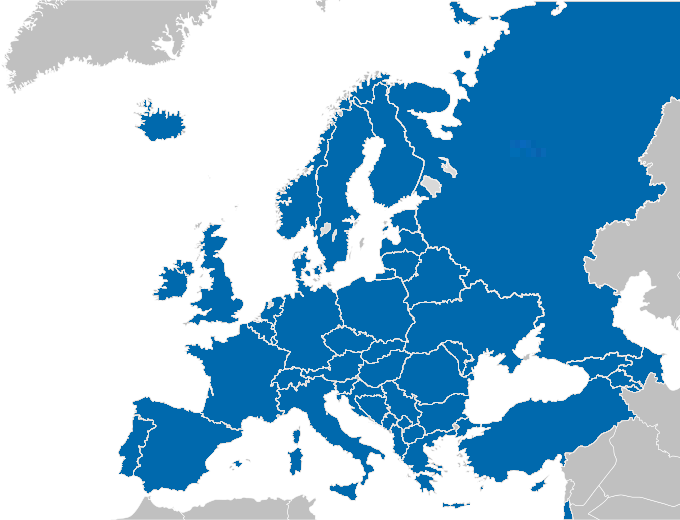
European Athletics Members

The European Athletics Team Championships (European Team Championships until 2013) is an international athletics competition organised by European Athletics, between different countries of Europe, over four leagues. It replaced in 2009 the former and similar European Cup (1965–2008). Unlike most international competitions, medals are not awarded to individuals in individual events but to the overall winning team on a points system.

== History ==
The main idea of the cup, developed by Bruno Zauli, president of the European Committee of the International Association of Athletics Federations, was to create a competition for all European athletics federations, in which they would face each other in track and field events.

In 2008, it was decided for the competition to adopt a new format with four leagues, consisting of 20 events for men and 20 for women. The "Super League" and "First League" have 12 teams each, while the Second League and the Third League eight and 14 respectively. Team scores are calculated by combination of men and women's points, rather than the previous individual male and female scores. Each year, three teams are relegated from the top level and replaced by three teams promoted from the next level. Two teams are relegated/promoted from first level downwards.

In 2018, the ETC was to be held every odd year, with a super league of eight countries only starting in 2021 and first and second league of 12 countries. In the case of the host country is not qualified, a ninth could compete at the top level.

The 2023 edition of the Team Championships in Krakow, Poland, was the first to be integrated into the European Games, and European Athletics intimated that every second edition going forward would form part of that multi-sport event. The 2027 Team Championships was confirmed for the host of the 2027 European Games, Istanbul. In years where it forms part of the Games, individual European Games medals are allocated to the best performances across the divisions, as well as to the three leading nations in the Super League in the team event itself.

== Editions ==
as part of the European Games

League system
Edition	Year	Host city of the Super League	Winners			
Edition	Year	Host city of the Super League	Super League	First League	Second League	Third League
1	2009	Leiria, Portugal	Germany	Belarus	Lithuania	Israel
2	2010	Bergen, Norway	Russia	Czech Republic	Switzerland	Denmark
3	2011	Stockholm, Sweden	Germany	Turkey	Estonia	Israel
4	2013	Gateshead, United Kingdom	Germany	Czech Republic	Slovenia	Slovakia
5	2014	Braunschweig, Germany	Germany	Belarus	Switzerland	Cyprus
6	2015	Cheboksary, Russia	Russia	Czech Republic	Denmark	Slovakia
7	2017	Lille, France	Germany	Sweden	Hungary	Luxembourg
8	2019	Bydgoszcz, Poland	Poland	Portugal	Estonia	Iceland
9	2021	Chorzów, Poland	Poland	Czech Republic	Hungary	Serbia
Divisional system
Edition	Year	Host city of the First Division	Winners			
Edition	Year	Host city of the First Division	First Division		Second Division	Third Division
10	2023	Chorzów, Poland	Italy		Hungary	Ireland
11	2025	Madrid, Spain	Italy		Belgium	Iceland
12	2027	Istanbul, Turkey				

=== Host cities ===
League system
Year	Super League	First League	Second League	Third League
2009	(Portugal) Leiria	(Norway) Bergen	(Slovakia) Banská Bystrica	(Bosnia and Herzegovina) Sarajevo
2010	(Norway) Bergen	(Hungary) Budapest	(Serbia) Belgrade	(Malta) Marsa
2011	(Sweden) Stockholm	(Turkey) İzmir	(Serbia) Novi Sad	(Iceland) Reykjavík
2013	(United Kingdom) Gateshead	(Republic of Ireland) Dublin	(Lithuania) Kaunas	(Slovakia) Banská Bystrica
2014	(Germany) Braunschweig	(Estonia) Tallinn	(Latvia) Riga	(Georgia (country)) Tbilisi
2015	(Russia) Cheboksary	(Greece) Heraklion	(Bulgaria) Stara Zagora	(Azerbaijan) Baku
2017	(France) Lille	(Finland) Vaasa	(Israel) Tel Aviv	(Malta) Marsa
2019	(Poland) Bydgoszcz	(Norway) Sandnes	(Croatia) Varaždin	(North Macedonia) Skopje
2021	(Poland) Chorzów	(Romania) Cluj-Napoca	(Bulgaria) Stara Zagora	(Cyprus) Limassol

Division system
Year	1st Division	2nd Division	3rd Division
2023	(Poland) Chorzów		
2025	(Spain) Madrid	(Slovenia) Maribor	
2027	(Turkey) Istanbul		

== Team summary (Super League) ==
Country	2009	2010	2011	2013	2014	2015	2017	2019	2021	2023	2025	Years in SL
Belarus	13 ^{(1)}	8	9	11	13 ^{(1)}	9	10	14 ^{(1)}	10 ^{(1)}	DQ	DQ	5
Belgium	17 ^{(1)}	19 ^{(1)}	21 ^{(1)}	20 ^{(1)}	21 ^{(1)}	16 ^{(1)}	21 ^{(1)}	17 ^{(1)}	17 ^{(1)}	14	17 ^{(1)}	1
Czech Republic	10	13 ^{(1)}	10	13 ^{(1)}	10	13 ^{(1)}	8	8	9 ^{(1)}	9	11	7
Finland	14 ^{(1)}	12	20 ^{(1)}	18 ^{(1)}	15 ^{(1)}	11	13 ^{(1)}	11	15 ^{(1)}	11	15	5
France	3	4	5	4	4	3	3	3	6	7	7	11
Germany	1	3	1	2	1	2	1	2	4	3	3	11
Great Britain	2	2	4	3	5	5	4	5	3	5	5	11
Greece	9	10	14 ^{(1)}	10	17 ^{(1)}	14 ^{(1)}	9	10	16 ^{(1)}	13	12	7
Hungary	20 ^{(1)}	18 ^{(1)}	18 ^{(1)}	21 ^{(1)}	24 ^{(1)}	27 ^{(2)}	25 ^{(2)}	21 ^{(1)}	21 ^{(2)}	17 ^{(1)}	13	1
Italy	5	7	8	7	7	6	7	4	2	1	1	11
Lithuania	25 ^{(2)}	24 ^{(1)}	28 ^{(2)}	26 ^{(2)}	22 ^{(1)}	23 ^{(1)}	27 ^{(2)}	23 ^{(1)}	25 ^{(2)}	19 ^{(1)}	16	1
Netherlands	16 ^{(1)}	18 ^{(1)}	17 ^{(1)}	15 ^{(1)}	11	15 ^{(1)}	11	16 ^{(1)}	11 ^{(1)}	6	4	4
Norway	15 ^{(1)}	11	15 ^{(1)}	12	14 ^{(1)}	12	17 ^{(1)}	15 ^{(1)}	18 ^{(1)}	16	19 ^{(1)}	4
Poland	4	6	6	5	3	4	2	1	1	2	2	11
Portugal	11	15 ^{(1)}	11	17 ^{(1)}	20 ^{(1)}	17 ^{(1)}	16 ^{(1)}	13 ^{(1)}	7	8	8	5
Russia	8	1	2	1	2	1	DQ	DQ ^{(1)}	DQ ^{(2)}	DQ	DQ	6
Spain	7	9	7	8	8	8	5	6	5	4	6	11
Sweden	12	14 ^{(1)}	12	14 ^{(1)}	9	10	12 ^{(1)}	9	14 ^{(1)}	10	9	7
Switzerland	23 ^{(1)}	25 ^{(2)}	19 ^{(1)}	24 ^{(1)}	25 ^{(2)}	20 ^{(1)}	14 ^{(1)}	12	12 ^{(1)}	12	10	3
Turkey	18 ^{(1)}	21 ^{(1)}	13 ^{(1)}	9	12	19 ^{(1)}	15 ^{(1)}	17 ^{(1)}	13 ^{(1)}	15	20 ^{(1)}	3
Ukraine	6	5	3	6	6	7	6	7	WD	18 ^{(1)}	14	10

^{1} (1) = participated in First League.
^{2} (2) = participated in Second League.

== Medal table (Super League) ==
At the European Athletics Team Championships medals are not awarded, but with gold, silver and bronze conventionally refers to the top three finishes.

Rank	Nation	Gold	Silver	Bronze	Total
1	Germany	67	68	57	192
2	Great Britain	52	55	57	164
3	France	49	40	42	131
4	Russia	48	42	25	115
5	Poland	46	48	55	149
6	Italy	31	38	43	112
7	Ukraine	31	28	33	92
8	Spain	27	38	33	98
9	Netherlands	17	8	9	34
10	Czech Republic	9	10	12	31
11	Belarus	9	8	15	32
12	Greece	9	5	11	25
13	Sweden	8	13	7	28
14	Portugal	8	9	6	23
15	Switzerland	6	6	3	15
16	Turkey	3	5	6	14
17	Finland	3	4	6	13
18	Norway	1	6	4	11
19	Hungary	1	0	3	4
20	Belgium	0	4	2	6
21	Lithuania	0	0	2	2
Totals (21 entries)		425	435	431	1,291

== Championships records ==
=== Men ===
Event	Record	Athlete	Nationality	Date	Meet	Place	Ref.	Video
100 m	9.95 (+1.0 m/s) NR	Christophe Lemaitre	France	18 June 2011	2011 Super League	Stockholm, Sweden		
200 m	20.01 (+1.8 m/s)	Xavi Mo-Ajok	Netherlands	29 June 2025	2025 First Division	Madrid, Spain		
400 m	44.60	Samuel Reardon	Great Britain	27 June 2025	2025 First Division	Madrid, Spain		
800 m	1:44.01	Mohamed Attaoui	Spain	27 June 2025	2025 First Division	Madrid, Spain		
1500 m	3:36.95	Mohamed Katir	Spain	24 June 2023	2023 First Division	Chorzów, Poland		
3000 m	7:50.99	Richard Ringer	Germany	22 June 2014	2014 Super League	Braunschweig, Germany		
5000 m	13:17.23	Yemaneberhan Crippa	Italy	29 May 2021	2021 Super League	Chorzów, Poland		
110 m hurdles	13.12 (+0.4 m/s)	Jason Joseph	Switzerland	24 June 2023	2023 First Division	Chorzów, Poland		
400 m hurdles	48.14	Alessandro Sibilio	Italy	24 June 2023	2023 First Division	Chorzów, Poland		
3000 m steeplechase	8:20.43	Karl Bebendorf	Germany	27 June 2025	2025 First Division	Madrid, Spain		
High jump	2.35 m	Dmytro Demyanyuk	Ukraine	18 June 2011	2011 Super League	Stockholm, Sweden		
Pole vault	6.01 m	Renaud Lavillenie	France	21 June 2009	2009 Super League	Leiria, Portugal		
Long jump	8.46 m (+1.1 m/s)	Miltiadis Tentoglou	Greece	28 June 2025	2025 First Division	Madrid, Spain		
Triple jump	17.59 m (+0.6 m/s)	Nelson Évora	Portugal	21 June 2009	2009 Super League	Leiria, Portugal		
Shot put	21.83 m	Michał Haratyk	Poland	10 August 2019	2019 Super League	Bydgoszcz, Poland		
Discus throw	69.94 m	Kristjan Čeh	Slovenia	21 June 2023	2023 Second Division	Chorzów, Poland		
Hammer throw	82.98 m	Paweł Fajdek	Poland	30 May 2021	2021 Super League	Chorzów, Poland		
Javelin throw	96.29 m	Johannes Vetter	Germany	29 May 2021	2021 Super League	Chorzów, Poland		
4 × 100 m relay	37.87 NR	Nsikak Ekpo; Xavi Mo-Ajok; Taymir Burnet; Elvis Afrifa	Netherlands	28 June 2025	2025 First Division	Madrid, Spain		
4 × 400 m relay	3:00.47	Mame-Ibra Anne; Teddy Venel; Mamoudou Hanne; Thomas Jordier	France	21 June 2015	2015 Super League	Cheboksary, Russia		

Key:
^{WR} World record	^{ER} European record	^{NR} National record

=== Women ===
Event	Record	Athlete	Nationality	Date	Meet	Place	Ref.
100 m	11.06 (±0.0 m/s) NR	Boglárka Takács	Hungary	27 June 2025	2025 First Division	Madrid, Spain	
200 m	22.19 (+0.8 m/s) NR	Jaël Bestué	Spain	29 June 2025	2025 First Division	Madrid, Spain	
400 m	49.48	Femke Bol	Netherlands	27 June 2025	2025 First Division	Madrid, Spain	
800 m	1:58.60	Agathe Guillemot	France	29 June 2025	2025 First Division	Madrid, Spain	
1500 m	4:05.32	Anna Mishchenko	Ukraine	20 June 2010	2010 Super League	Bergen, Norway	
3000 m	8:45.24	Sifan Hassan	Netherlands	20 June 2014	2014 Super League	Braunschweig, Germany	
5000 m	15:09.31	Elvan Abeylegesse	Turkey	20 June 2010	2010 First League	Budapest, Hungary	
100 m hurdles	12.62 (+1.3 m/s)	Elvira Herman	Belarus	20 June 2021	2021 First League	Cluj-Napoca, Romania	
400 m hurdles	53.70	Vania Stambolova	Bulgaria	18 June 2011	2011 Second League	Novi Sad, Serbia	
3000 m steeplechase	9:17.31	Luiza Gega	Albania	22 June 2023	2023 Third Division	Chorzów, Poland	
High jump	2.04 m	Blanka Vlašić	Croatia	21 June 2009	2009 Second League	Banská Bystrica, Slovakia	
Pole vault	4.75 m	Anna Rogowska	Poland	18 June 2011	2011 Super League	Stockholm, Sweden	
Pole vault	4.75 m	Silke Spiegelburg	Germany	18 June 2011	2011 Super League	Stockholm, Sweden	
Pole vault	4.75 m	Silke Spiegelburg	Germany	20 June 2015	2015 Super League	Cheboksary, Russia	
Long jump	6.95 m	Darya Klishina	Russia	21 June 2015	2015 Super League	Cheboksary, Russia	
Triple jump	14.87 m (+1.7 m/s)	Yekaterina Koneva	Russia	20 June 2015	2015 Super League	Cheboksary, Russia	
Shot put	20.14 m	Jessica Schilder	Netherlands	27 June 2025	2025 First Division	Madrid, Spain	
Discus throw	68.58 m	Sandra Perković	Croatia	10 August 2019	2019 Second League	Varaždin, Croatia	
Hammer throw	78.28 m	Anita Włodarczyk	Poland	21 June 2015	2015 Super League	Cheboksary, Russia	
Javelin throw	69.19 m	Christin Hussong	Germany	30 May 2021	2021 Super League	Chorzów, Poland	
4 × 100 m relay	42.02	Nadine Visser; Lieke Klaver; Minke Bisschops; Marije van Hunenstijn	Netherlands	28 June 2025	2025 First Division	Madrid, Spain	
4 × 400 m relay	3:23.76	Kseniya Zadorina; Natalya Ivanova; Natalya Antyukh; Kseniya Ustalova	Russia	20 June 2010	2010 Super League	Bergen, Norway	

=== Mixed ===
Event	Record	Athlete	Nationality	Date	Meet	Place	Ref.
4 × 400 m relay	3:09.43	Maksymilian Szwed; Justyna Święty-Ersetic; Daniel Soltysiak; Natalia Bukowiecka	Poland	29 June 2025	2025 First Division	Madrid, Spain	

Key:
^{WR} World record	^{ER} European record	^{NR} National record

== See also ==
- European Cup (athletics)
