= Charles Decker =

Indiana politician

Charles Decker (1911 – October 11, 1962) was a state legislator in Indiana. A Republican, he represented Vanderburgh County, Indiana in the Indiana House of Representatives. He was elected to the Indiana House in 1946 and lost his re-election campaign in 1948. He was a Republican. He lived in Evansville, Indiana. In 1973 he was noted as the first and only black to serve in the state legislature from Evansville.

He was born in Hopkinsville, Kentucky. He was African American. He was involved in union organizing.
