= Victoria Rausch =

Luxembourgish hurdler

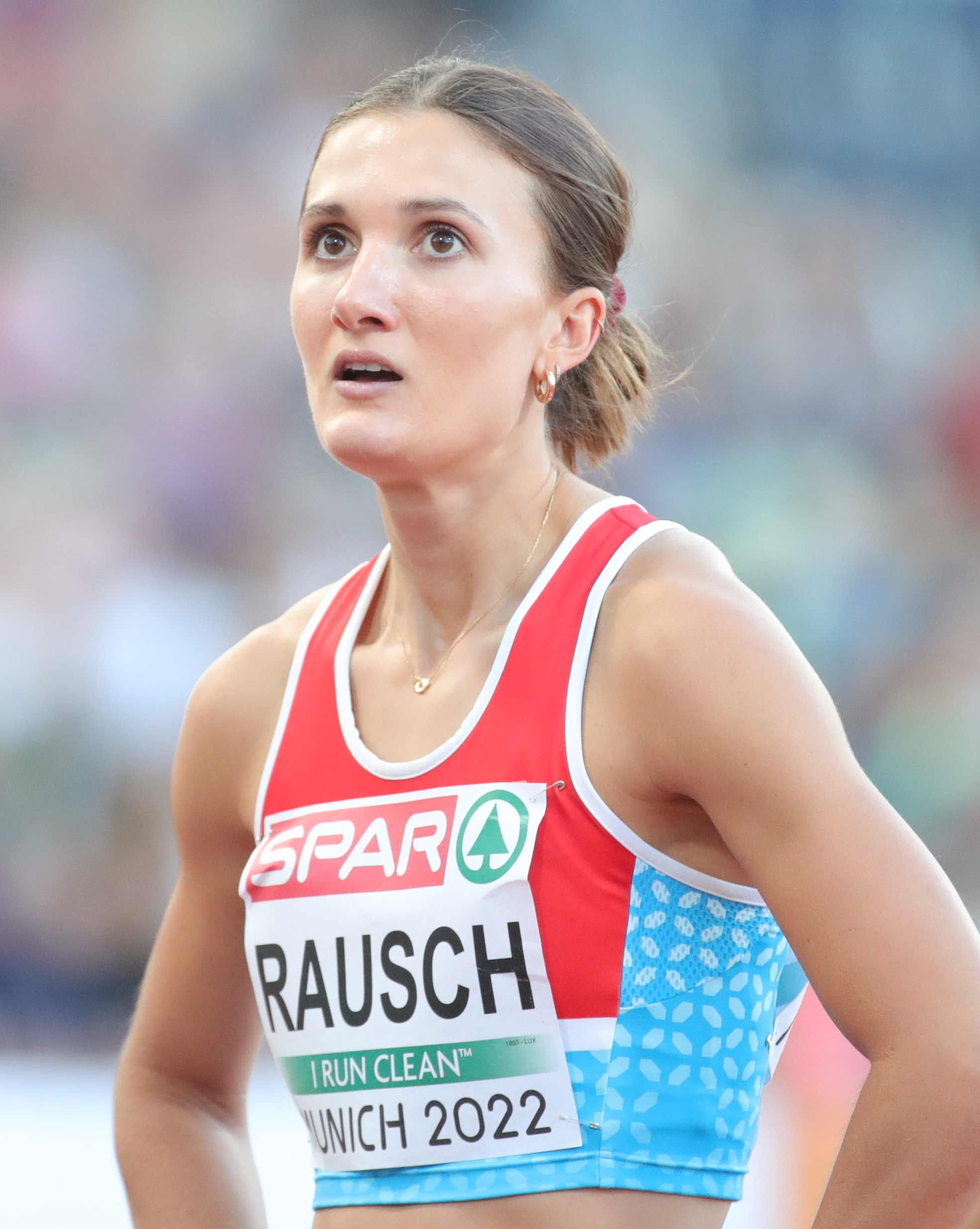
- Rausch at the 2022 European Championships

Personal information
- Born: 26 June 1996 (age 30)

Sport
- Sport: Athletics
- Event: Hurdles

Achievements and titles
- Personal bests: 60mH: 8.08 (2026) NR; 100mH: 13.09 (2025) NR

Victoria Rausch (born 26 June 1996) is a Luxembourgish hurdler. A multiple-time national champion, she is the national record holder in the 60 metres hurdles and 100m hurdles.

== Biography ==
A multiple-time Luxembourgish national champion, Rausch set new a new national record in the 60 metres hurdles in January 2022, breaking the record which had been set by Veronique Linster, and had stood for 26 years. The following month, she improved her own record whilst competing in Metz, France. Later that year, she also set a new national record in the 100m hurdles that year, with a time of 13.24 seconds. She made her senior international debut at the 2022 European Athletics Championships in Munich, reaching the semi-finals of the 100 metres hurdles.

Having won the national indoor title over 60 metre hurdles in 2023, she competed at the 2023 European Athletics Indoor Championships in Istanbul, without advancing to the final. That summer, she was a semi-finalist over 100 metres hurdles at the delayed at the 2021 Summer World University Games held in August 2023 in Chengdu, China.

Rausch won the 100 metres hurdles at the 2025 European Athletics Team Championships Third Division in Maribor, Slovenia, in June 2025, helping Luxembourg gain promotion to the Second Division. In July, Rausch set a new national record in the 100 metres hurdles of 13.09 seconds at the International Meeting in Schifflange. In August, Rausch won the women's 100m hurdles final at the Luxembourg Athletics Championships, running 13.28 seconds into a strong headwind.

Rausch ran a Luxembourg national record in the 60m hurdles with a time of 8.08 seconds on 18 January 2026, at the CMCM Indoor Meeting in Luxembourg, a silver meeting on the 2026 World Athletics Indoor Tour. In March 2026, she ran in the 60 metres hurdles at the 2026 World Athletics Indoor Championships in Toruń, Poland.
