= Gor Hovakimyan =

Armenian triple jumper (born 2004)

Personal information
- Born: 3 November 2004 (age 21)

Sport
- Sport: Athletics
- Event: Triple jump

Achievements and titles
- Personal best(s): Triple jump: 16.66m (2026); Long jump: 7.67m (2025)
Medal record
Men's athletics
Representing Armenia
Balkan Indoor Championships
Gold medal – first place	2026 Belgrade	Triple jump

Gor Hovakimyan (born 3 November 2004) is an Armenian triple jumper and long jumper. He won the triple jump at the 2026 Balkan Athletics Indoor Championships and represented Armenia at the 2026 World Athletics Indoor Championships.

== Biography ==
Hovakimyan is coached by his father Garnik Hovakimyan as well as the fourth best long jumper of all time, Robert Emmiyan. In April 2025, he won two silver medals, one in the triple jump with a jump of 15.72 metres, and one in the long jump with a best jump of 7.41 metres, at the 4th International Athletics Tournament Imam Reza Cup in Iran. He set a personal best in the long jump of 7.76 metres representing Armenia at the 2025 European Athletics Team Championships Third Division in Maribor, Slovenia, in June 2015, placing third overall. He also placed second in the triple jump at the championships.

Hovakimyan won the 2026 Balkan Athletics Indoor Championships In Belgrade, Serbia, with a personal best jump of 16.66 metres in February 2026. He was the youngest man to qualify for the triple jump at the 2026 World Athletics Indoor Championships in Toruń, Poland in March 2026, where he placed fourteenth overall with a best jump of 16.25 metres.
