= Fanny Arendt =

Luxembourgish middle-distance runner

Personal information
- Born: 5 June 2002 (age 24)

Sport
- Sport: Athletics
- Events: Middle-distance running, Sprint

Achievements and titles
- Personal bests: 400m: 52.84 (2024) NR; Indoor; 200m: 24.66 (2026); 400m: 53.08 (2026) NR; 800m: 2:00.83 (2026) NR

Fanny Arendt (born 5 June 2002) is a track and field athlete from Luxembourg who competes as a sprinter and middle-distance runner. She is a national record holder and multiple-time national champion.

== Early and personal life ==
A twin, both Arendt and her twin sister Noa, a rugby union player at McMaster University in Hamilton, Ontario, both had double scoliosis in childhood. Between the age of 5 to 17, Arendt wore a corset; up to her neck when she younger, and later from waist to armpits. She suffered many injuries and stress fractures and later moderated her training regime to include more cycling and cross training.

== Career ==
Arendt competed for Luxembourg at the 2023 European Games, but was only able to compete sparingly in 2024 due to injury. In June 2024, she won the Luxembourg national title over 400 metres, and placed second over 800 metres.

Competing in the United States for Texas Tech University, Arendt broke Charline Mathias' 15-year-old 400 metres national record in 2025, and set school records that year in the women's 800 metres both indoors and outdoors. She won the women's 800 meters at the Big 12 indoor championships, and placed second at the Big 12 outdoor championships, setting a new personal best on five occasions.

Arendt won the 400 metres at the 2025 European Athletics Team Championships Third Division in Maribor, Slovenia, in June 2025, helping Luxembourg gain promotion to the Second Division. She also won in the 4 x 400 metres relay with the Luxembourg team at the championships. She placed fourth over 800 metres at the 2025 Summer World University Games in Bochum, Germany. In August, Arendt won both the women's 400 metres and 800 metres titles at the Luxembourg Athletics Championships.

Arendt ran a Luxembourg national indoor record and outright lifetime best over 800 metres of 2:00.83 on 18 January 2026, at the CMCM Indoor Meeting in Luxembourg, a silver meeting on the 2026 World Athletics Indoor Tour. In June, she qualified for the 800 metres at the 2026 NCAA Outdoor Championships.
