= Ísold Sævarsdóttir =

Icelandic athlete (born 2007)

Personal information
- Born: 17 February 2007 (age 18)
- Listed height: 168 cm (5 ft 6 in)

Career information
- Playing career: 2022–present
- Position: Guard

Career history
- 2022–2024: Stjarnan

Career highlights and awards
- 1. deild Defense Player of The Year (2023); 1. deild kvenna winner (2023)

Ísold Sævarsdóttir (born 17 February 2007) is an Icelandic multi-sport athlete. She competes in track and field with Fimleikafélag Hafnarfjarðar and in basketball with Stjarnan and the Icelandic national team.

== Basketball ==
=== Club career ===
Ísold played junior basketball with Stjarnan. She played her first senior team games during the 2022–2023 season, when she helped Stjarnan win the 1. deild kvenna and gain promotion to the top-tier Úrvalsdeild kvenna.For the season, she averaged 14.4 points, 5.3 rebounds and 4.2 assists and was named the 1. deild Defense Player of The Year. In September 2024, she announced that she would be taking a break from basketball to focus on her track and field career.

=== National team career ===
In November 2023, Ísold was selected to the Icelandic senior national team for the first time.
