= Croatia at the 2018 European Championships =

- IOC code: CRO

in (United Kingdom) Glasgow (Germany) Berlin 2 August 2018 – 12 August 2018
- Competitors: 42 in 5 sports
- Medals Ranked 19th: Gold 2 Silver 1 Bronze 0 Total 3

European Championships appearances
- 2018; 2022

Croatia competed at the inaugural 7 sports 2018 European Championships from 2 to 12 August 2018. It competed in 5 sports.

== Medallists ==
Medal	Name	Sport	Event	Date
Gold	Martin Sinković; Valent Sinković	Rowing	Men's pair	4 August
Gold	Sandra Perković	Athletics	Women's discus throw	11 August
Silver	Robert Seligman	Gymnastics	Men's pommel horse	12 August

== Aquatics ==
=== Diving ===
Women

Athlete	Event	Preliminaries		Final	
Athlete	Event	Points	Rank	Points	Rank
Marcela Marić	1 m springboard	206.80	17	did not advance	

=== Swimming ===
Men

Athlete	Event	Heats		Semifinal		Final	
Athlete	Event	Result	Rank	Result	Rank	Result	Rank
Bruno Blašković	50 metre freestyle	22.50	19 Q	22.06	10	did not advance	
Bruno Blašković	100 metre freestyle	48.88	8 Q	48.90	8 Q	49.02	8
Bruno Blašković	50 metre butterfly	23.68	13 Q	23.73	14	did not advance	
Ivan Gajšek	100 metre backstroke	56.41	39	did not advance			
Ivan Gajšek	200 metre backstroke	2:02.05	23	did not advance			
Anton Lončar	50 metre backstroke	26.62	45	did not advance			
Anton Lončar	100 metre backstroke	55.39	28	did not advance			
Anton Lončar	200 metre backstroke	2:00.11	18 Q	1:59.86	13	did not advance	
Nikola Miljenić	50 metre freestyle	23.21	47	did not advance			
Nikola Miljenić	100 metre freestyle	51.44	65	did not advance			
Nikola Miljenić	50 metre butterfly	24.13	30	did not advance			
Marin Mogić	400 metre freestyle	3:50.48	14	—N/a		did not advance	
Marin Mogić	800 metre freestyle	7:51.78	3 Q	—N/a		7:58.03	8
Marin Mogić	1500 metre freestyle	15:04.45	9	—N/a		did not advance	
Nikola Obrovac	50 metre breaststroke	27.62	13 Q	27.75	15	did not advance	
Nikola Obrovac	100 metre breaststroke	1:03.23	44	did not advance			
Mislav Sever	50 metre freestyle	22.86	31	did not advance			
Mislav Sever	100 metre freestyle	49.78	27	did not advance			
Mislav Sever	50 metre butterfly	24.88	55	did not advance			
Filip Zelić	200 metre freestyle	1:52.18	50	did not advance			
Filip Zelić	100 metre butterfly	55.41	53	did not advance			
Filip Zelić	200 metre butterfly	2:00.04	22	did not advance			
Bruno Blašković; Anton Lončar; Nikola Miljenić; Nikola Obrovac	4 × 100 metre medley relay	3:40.86	17	—N/a		did not advance	

Women

Athlete	Event	Heats		Semifinal		Final	
Athlete	Event	Result	Rank	Result	Rank	Result	Rank
Lucija Aralica	10 kilometre open water	—N/a				2:15:38.3	28

== Athletics ==
Men
Track and road

Athlete	Event	Heats		Semifinal		Final	
Athlete	Event	Result	Rank	Result	Rank	Result	Rank
Mateo Ružić	400 metres	47.32	32	did not advance			
Sven Cepuš	800 metres	1:47.56	13	did not advance			
Dan Daly	Marathon	—N/a				2:29:25	56
Hrvoje Čukman	400 metres hurdles	52.93	24	did not advance			
Mateo Ružić; Hrvoje Čukman; Sven Čepus; Mateo Kovačić	4 × 400 metres relay	3:07.80 SB	12	—N/a		did not advance	
Bruno Erent	50 kilometres walk	—N/a				4:24:20	25

Field events

Athletes	Event	Qualification		Final	
Athletes	Event	Distance	Position	Distance	Position
Ivan Horvat	Pole vault	5.36	22	did not advance	
Filip Pravdica	Long jump	7.52	23	did not advance	
Filip Mihaljević	Shot put	19.32	22	did not advance	
Stipe Žunić	Shot put	20.61	2 Q	20.73	7

Women
Track and road

Athlete	Event	Heats		Semifinal		Final	
Athlete	Event	Result	Rank	Result	Rank	Result	Rank
Bojana Bjeljac	Marathon	—N/a				2:37:31 PB	20
Matea Matošević	Marathon	—N/a				2:56:29	45
Nikolina Stepan	Marathon	—N/a				2:47:55	41
Nikolina Šustić	Marathon	—N/a				2:42:44 PB	34
Bojana Bjeljac; Matea Matošević; Nikolina Stepan; Nikolina Šustić	Marathon team	—N/a				8:08:09	9
Andrea Ivančević	100 metres hurdles	Bye		13.13	17	did not advance	
Ivana Lončarek	100 metres hurdles	13.23	13	did not advance			
Ivana Renić	50 kilometres walk	—N/a				4:35:39 NR	12

Field events

Athletes	Event	Qualification		Final	
Athletes	Event	Distance	Position	Distance	Position
Ana Šimić	High jump	1.90	7 q	1.87	10
Sandra Perković	Discus throw	64.54	1 Q	67.62	Gold medal
Marija Tolj	Discus throw	55.52	16	did not advance	
Anamari Kožul	Hammer throw	62.55	25	did not advance	

== Gymnastics ==
=== Men ===
Team

Athlete	Event	Qualification								Final							
Athlete	Event	Apparatus						Total	Rank	Apparatus						Total	Rank
Athlete	Event	F	PH	R	V	PB	HB	Total	Rank	F	PH	R	V	PB	HB	Total	Rank
Anton Kovačević	Team	7.200	—N/a	6.233	10.600	—N/a	13.400	—N/a									
Robert Seligman	Team	—N/a	14.766 Q	—N/a	10.466	11.600	—N/a	—N/a									
Filip Ude	Team	13.300	14.766 Q	5.866	—N/a		11.366	—N/a									
Jakov Vlahek	Team	7.766	8.566	5.466	10.366	11.700	6.500	—N/a									
Total	Team	28.266	38.098	17.565	31.432	23.300	31.266	169.927	28	—N/a							

Individual finals

Athlete	Event	Apparatus						Rank
Athlete	Event	F	PH	R	V	PB	HB	Rank
Robert Seligman	Pommel horse	—N/a	14.866	—N/a				Silver medal
Filip Ude	Pommel horse	—N/a	14.000	—N/a				6

=== Women ===
Qualification

Athlete	Qualification			
Athlete	Apparatus			
Athlete	V	UB	BB	F
Christina Zwicker	—N/a	10.733	10.366	11.300

== Rowing ==
Men

Athlete	Event	Heats		Repechage		Semifinals		Final	
Athlete	Event	Time	Rank	Time	Rank	Time	Rank	Time	Rank
Damir Martin	Single sculls	7:04.05	3 R	7:01.04	4 FC	—N/a		7:07.89	15
Martin Sinković; Valent Sinković	Pair	6:39.45	1 SF A/B	Bye		6:22.18	1 FA	6:26.42	Gold medal
Luka Radonić	Lightweight single sculls	7:13.98	2 SF A/B	Bye		7:11.44	3 FA	7:02.80	5

== Triathlon ==
Individual

Athlete	Event	Swim (1.5 km)	Trans 1	Bike (40 km)	Trans 2	Run (10 km)	Total Time	Rank
Jacopo Butturini	Men's	17:41	0:54	57:45	0:28	34:49	1:51:37	28
