= Croatia at the 2022 European Championships =

in (Germany) Munich 11 August 2022 – 22 August 2022
- Competitors: 39 in 8 sports
- Medals Ranked 20th: Gold 3 Silver 1 Bronze 3 Total 7

European Championships appearances
- 2018; 2022

Croatia competed at the 2022 European Championships in Munich from August 11 to August 22, 2022.

== Medallists ==
Medal	Name	Sport	Event	Date
Gold	Martin Sinković; Valent Sinković	Rowing	Men's double sculls	14 August
Gold	Filip Mihaljević	Athletics	Men's shot put	15 August
Gold	Sandra Perković	Athletics	Women's discus throw	16 August
Silver	Matea Parlov Koštro	Athletics	Women's marathon	15 August
Bronze	Marin Ranteš	Cycling	Men's BMX freestyle	13 August
Bronze	Vanesa Tot	Canoeing	Women's C–1 500 metres	19 August
Bronze	Vanesa Tot	Canoeing	Women's C–1 200 metres	21 August

== Competitors ==
The following is the list of number of competitors in the Championships:

Sport	Men	Women	Total
Artistic gymnastics (men and women)	5	5	10
Athletics	4	7	48
Canoe sprint	1	2	3
Cycling BMX	1	0	1
Cycling road	1	0	1
Rowing	2	3	5
Table tennis	4	3	7
Triathlon	1	0	1
Total	19	20	39

== Athletics ==
Croatia entered the following athletes.

Key

- Q = Qualified for the next round
- q = Qualified for the next round as a fastest loser or, in field events, by position without achieving the qualifying target
- NR = National record
- PB = Personal best
- SB = Season best
- N/A = Round not applicable for the event

=== Men ===
Field events

Athletes	Event	Qualification		Final	
Athletes	Event	Distance	Position	Distance	Position
Marko Čeko	Long jump	7.74	11 q	7.77	8
Martin Marković	Discus throw	60.30	18	did not advance	
Filip Mihaljević	Shot put	20.30	9 q	21.88 SB	1st place, gold medalist(s)
Filip Pravdica	Long jump	6.95	20	did not advance	

=== Women ===
Track and road

Athletes	Event	Heats		Semifinal		Final	
Athletes	Event	Result	Rank	Result	Rank	Result	Rank
Ivana Lončarek	100 m hurdles	13.50	16	did not advance			
Matea Parlov Koštro	Marathon	—N/a				2:28:42	2nd place, silver medalist(s)
Ana Štefulj	Marathon	—N/a				did not finish	

Field events

Athletes	Event	Qualification		Final	
Athletes	Event	Distance	Position	Distance	Position
Paola Borović	Triple jump	NM		did not advance	
Sara Kolak	Javelin throw	57.31	14	did not advance	
Sandra Perković	Discus throw	65.94	1 Q	67.95	1st place, gold medalist(s)
Marija Tolj	Discus throw	62.51	6 q	63.37	6

== Canoeing ==
Men

Athlete	Event	Heats		Semifinals		Final	
Athlete	Event	Time	Rank	Time	Rank	Time	Rank
Antun Novaković	K-1 500 m	1:45.902	5 SF	1:45.507	5 FB	1:42.681	18

Women

Athlete	Event	Heats		Semifinals		Final	
Athlete	Event	Time	Rank	Time	Rank	Time	Rank
Vanesa Tot	C-1 200 m	48.397	3 F	Bye		49.489	3rd place, bronze medalist(s)
Vanesa Tot	C-1 500 m	—N/a				2:06.682	3rd place, bronze medalist(s)
Anamaria Govorčinović	K-1 500 m	1:54.040	1 FA	Bye		1:57.750	9
Anamaria Govorčinović	K-1 1000 m	4:07.033	3 F	Bye		4:01.485	4

== Cycling ==
=== Road ===
Men

Athlete	Event	Time	Rank
Viktor Potočki	Road race	4:37:09	48

=== BMX freestyle ===
Athlete	Event	Qualification		Final	
Athlete	Event	Points	Rank	Points	Rank
Marin Ranteš	Men's	68.84	10 Q	88.80	3rd place, bronze medalist(s)

== Gymnastics ==
Belgium has entered five male and five female athletes.

=== Men ===
Qualification

Athlete	Qualification					
Athlete	Apparatus					
Athlete	F	PH	R	V	PB	HB
Aurel Benović	12.133	—N/a				
Robert Seligman	—N/a	13.766	—N/a			
Tin Srbić	—N/a					13.466
Filip Ude	—N/a	14.433 Q	—N/a			
Mateo Žugec	—N/a	13.833	—N/a			

Individual finals

Athlete	Event	Apparatus						Total	Rank
Athlete	Event	F	PH	R	V	PB	HB	Total	Rank
Filip Ude	Pommel horse	—N/a	13.933	—N/a				13.933	7

=== Women ===
Qualification

Athlete	Event	Qualification						Final					
Athlete	Event	Apparatus				Total	Rank	Apparatus				Total	Rank
Athlete	Event	V	UB	BB	F	Total	Rank	V	UB	BB	F	Total	Rank
Ana Đerek	Team	—N/a		12.666	12.766	—N/a		Did not advance					
Petra Furač	Team	12.166	10.666	10.966	10.433	44.231	64	Did not advance					
Tijana Korent	Team	12.733	—N/a					Did not advance					
Nika Kukuljan Frleta	Team	11.666	10.166	11.166	10.833	43.831	67	Did not advance					
Sara Šulekić	Team	11.833	10.400	9.800	11.433	43.466	69	Did not advance					
Total	Team	36.732	31.232	34.798	35.032	137.794	25	Did not advance					

== Rowing ==
Men

Athlete	Event	Heats		Repechage		Semifinals		Final	
Athlete	Event	Time	Rank	Time	Rank	Time	Rank	Time	Rank
Martin Sinković; Valent Sinković	Double sculls	6:51.69	1 SA/B	Bye		6:35.99	1 FA	6:35.93	1st place, gold medalist(s)

Women

Athlete	Event	Heats		Repechage		Semifinals		Final	
Athlete	Event	Time	Rank	Time	Rank	Time	Rank	Time	Rank
Ivana Jurković; Josipa Jurković	Coxless pair	7:51.42	2 FA	Bye		—N/a		7:48.26	5
Dora Dragičević	Lightweight single sculls	8:56.35	5 R	8:36.03	4 FB	—N/a		8:35.79	9

== Table tennis ==
Croatia entered 4 men and 3 women.

=== Men ===
Athlete	Event	Qualification stage				Preliminary Round 1	Preliminary Round 2	Round of 64	Round of 32	Round of 16	Quarterfinals	Semifinals	Final / BM	
Athlete	Event	Opposition Score	Opposition Score	Opposition Score	Rank	Opposition Score	Opposition Score	Opposition Score	Opposition Score	Opposition Score	Opposition Score	Opposition Score	Opposition Score	Rank
Andrej Gaćina	Singles	Bye						Kožul (SLO); W 4–0	Wang (SVK); L 1–4	Did not advance				17
Frane Kojić	Singles	Ursu (MDA); L 0–3	Chiriță (ROU); W 3–2	Gutić (BIH); W 3–0	2 Q	Bye	Putuntica (MDA); W 3–2	Karlsson (SWE); L 2–4	Did not advance					33
Tomislav Pucar	Singles	Bye						Sipos (ROU); W 4–1	Rassenfosse (BEL); W 4–3	Jorgić (SLO); L 1–4	Did not advance			9
Filip Zeljko	Singles	Bye						Hribar (SLO); W 4–0	Jorgić (SLO); L 2–4	Did not advance				17
Frane Kojić; Filip Zeljko	Doubles	—N/a				Bye	Oláh / Naumi (FIN); W 3–2	—N/a	Nuytinck (BEL) / Dyjas (POL); L 1–3	Did not advance				17

=== Women ===
Athlete	Event	Qualification stage				Preliminary Round 1	Preliminary Round 2	Round of 64	Round of 32	Round of 16	Quarterfinals	Semifinals	Final / BM	
Athlete	Event	Opposition Score	Opposition Score	Opposition Score	Rank	Opposition Score	Opposition Score	Opposition Score	Opposition Score	Opposition Score	Opposition Score	Opposition Score	Opposition Score	Rank
Hana Arapović	Singles	Paridi (GRE); W 3–2	Plaian (ROU); W 3–2	—N/a	1 Q	Bye		Lutz (FRA); W 4–3	Partyka (POL); L 3–4	Did not advance				17
Mateja Jeger	Singles	Santos (POR); W 3–0	Węgrzyn (POL); L 0–3	—N/a	2 Q	Degraef (BEL); W 3–2	Bergand (SWE); W 3–1	Matelová (CZE); L 2–4	Did not advance					33
Ivana Malobabić	Singles	Yovkova (BUL); W 3–0	Kulakçeken (TUR); W 3–0	—N/a	1 Q	Bye		Pavade (FRA); L 1–4	Did not advance					33
Hana Arapović; Mateja Jeger	Doubles	—N/a				Bye		—N/a	Partyka / Bajor (POL); L 1–3	Did not advance				17
Ivana Malobabić; Solomiya Brateyko (UKR)	Doubles	—N/a				Bye	Men / Ernst (NED); W 3–0	—N/a	Mischek (AUT) / Ho (ENG); L 2–3	Did not advance				17

=== Mixed ===
Athlete	Event	Preliminary Round 1	Preliminary Round 2	Round of 32	Round of 16	Quarterfinals	Semifinals	Final / BM	
Athlete	Event	Opposition Score	Opposition Score	Opposition Score	Opposition Score	Opposition Score	Opposition Score	Opposition Score	Rank
Filip Zeljko; Mateja Jeger	Doubles	Bye	Ursu / Chiriacova (MDA); W 3–1	Gauzy / Pavade (FRA); L 0–3	Did not advance				17
Andrei Putintica (MDA); Hana Arapović	Doubles	Bye	Kožul / Stražar (SLO); L 0–3	Did not advance					33

== Triathlon ==
Athlete	Event	Swim (1.5 km)	Trans 1	Bike (40 km)	Trans 2	Run (10 km)	Total Time	Rank
Jacopo Butturini	Men's	18:42	0:37	53:54	0:27	38:01	1:51:41	54
