= 2015 European Athletics Indoor Championships – Women's 60 metres hurdles =

The women's 60 metres hurdles event at the 2015 European Athletics Indoor Championships was held on 6 March 2015 at 10:05 (heats), 16:00 (semifinals) and 18:35 (final) local time.

== Medalists ==
Gold	Silver	Bronze
Alina Talay; Belarus	Lucy Hatton; Great Britain	Serita Solomon; Great Britain

== Results ==
=== Heats ===
Qualification: First 3 of each heat (Q) and the next 4 fastest (q) qualified for the semifinals.

Rank	Heat	Athlete	Nationality	Time	Note
1	3	Lucy Hatton	Great Britain	7.96	Q, PB
2	3	Eline Berings	Belgium	8.01	Q
3	3	Andrea Ivančević	Croatia	8.02	Q, NR
4	4	Serita Solomon	Great Britain	8.03	Q, PB
5	1	Hanna Plotitsyna	Ukraine	8.04	Q
5	2	Alina Talay	Belarus	8.04	Q
5	4	Josephine Onyia	Spain	8.04	Q
8	4	Nooralotta Neziri	Finland	8.05	Q
9	1	Cindy Roleder	Germany	8.07	Q
9	2	Isabelle Pedersen	Norway	8.07	Q
11	3	Marina Tomić	Slovenia	8.09	q, SB
11	4	Giulia Pennella	Italy	8.09	q
13	2	Noemi Zbären	Switzerland	8.11	Q, PB
14	1	Nina Morozova	Russia	8.12	Q
14	3	Nadine Visser	Netherlands	8.12	q
16	1	Karolina Kołeczek	Poland	8.13	q
17	2	Anne Zagré	Belgium	8.15	
18	4	Lucie Škrobáková	Czech Republic	8.17	SB
19	2	Kateřina Cachová	Czech Republic	8.18	
20	1	Sonata Tamošaitytė	Lithuania	8.19	
21	1	Caridad Jerez	Spain	8.20	
22	3	Lucie Koudelová	Czech Republic	8.22	
23	4	Olena Yanovska	Ukraine	8.27	
24	2	Elisavet Pesiridou	Greece	8.36	
25	3	Lucia Mokrášová	Slovakia	8.48	PB
	2	Marzia Caravelli	Italy	DNS	

=== Semifinals ===
Qualification: First 4 of each semifinal (Q) qualified directly for the final.

Rank	Heat	Athlete	Nationality	Time	Note
1	1	Alina Talay	Belarus	7.89	Q
2	1	Lucy Hatton	Great Britain	7.93	Q, PB
3	1	Isabelle Pedersen	Norway	7.95	Q, PB
3	2	Serita Solomon	Great Britain	7.95	Q, PB
5	1	Andrea Ivančević	Croatia	7.97	Q, NR
6	2	Nooralotta Neziri	Finland	7.98	Q, =NR
7	2	Cindy Roleder	Germany	7.98	Q, SB
8	1	Eline Berings	Belgium	8.02	
8	2	Hanna Plotitsyna	Ukraine	8.02	Q
10	2	Josephine Onyia	Spain	8.04	
11	1	Nina Morozova	Russia	8.05	PB
12	1	Karolina Kołeczek	Poland	8.05	PB
13	1	Marina Tomić	Slovenia	8.08	SB
14	2	Giulia Pennella	Italy	8.08	=SB
15	2	Noemi Zbären	Switzerland	8.19	
	2	Nadine Visser	Netherlands	DNF	

=== Final ===
Rank	Lane	Athlete	Nationality	Time	Note
1st place, gold medalist(s)	6	Alina Talay	Belarus	7.85	NR
2nd place, silver medalist(s)	3	Lucy Hatton	Great Britain	7.90	PB
3rd place, bronze medalist(s)	5	Serita Solomon	Great Britain	7.93	PB
4	8	Cindy Roleder	Germany	7.93	PB
5	7	Isabelle Pedersen	Norway	7.96	
6	4	Nooralotta Neziri	Finland	7.97	NR
7	1	Andrea Ivančević	Croatia	8.02	
8	2	Hanna Plotitsyna	Ukraine	8.10	
