= List of Croatian records in athletics =

The following are the national records in athletics in Croatia maintained by the national athletics federation of Croatia, Croatian Athletics Federation (HAS).

Some of the Croatian records in athletics predate Croatia's declaration of independence from Yugoslavia in 1991, and the formation of the Croatian Athletics Federation in 1992. These records, set by Croatian athletes competing for Yugoslavia, were retroactively ratified as Croatian records.

Since 1993, only the results achieved at competitions with doping control according to the IAAF rules are ratified as senior men's and women's national records.

== Outdoor ==
Key to tables: Awaiting ratification Record not kept by HAS Not ratified or later rescinded by HAS

=== Men ===
Event	Record	Athlete	Date	Meet	Place	Ref.
100 m	10.20 (+1.5 m/s)	Dario Horvat	11 May 2013	Azusa Pacific Last Chance Qualifier	Azusa, United States	
200 m	20.57 (+1.1 m/s)	Karlo Marciuš	23 August 2025	41st Tomas Babiak Memorial	Bratislava, Slovakia	
300 m	32.29	Karlo Marciuš	10 September 2025	Međunarodni Athletic Meet	Karlovac, Croatia	
400 m	45.64	Željko Knapić	19 September 1981		Sarajevo, Yugoslavia	
600 m	1:15.89	Marino Bloudek	11 September 2024	Međunarodni Atletski Miting	Karlovac, Croatia	
800 m	1:44.01	Marino Bloudek	19 July 2025	Meeting de Atletismo Madrid	Madrid, Spain	
1000 m	2:17.02	Marino Bloudek	8 September 2024	Hanžeković Memorial	Zagreb, Croatia	
1000 m	2:15.40	Marino Bloudek	16 June 2026	Ostrava Golden Spike	Ostrava, Czech Republic	
1500 m	3:33.30	Branko Zorko	8 August 1998	Herculis	Fontvieille, Monaco	
Mile	3:52.64	Branko Zorko	5 August 1998	DN Galan	Stockholm, Sweden	
Mile (road)	4:06.46	Nino Jambrešić	19 September 2026	World Road Running Championships	Copenhagen, Denmark	
2000 m	4:58.02	Branko Zorko	10 July 1996	Meeting Nikaïa	Nice, France	
3000 m	7:48.50	Dino Bošnjak	10 September 2023	Hanžeković Memorial	Zagreb, Croatia	
5000 m	13:37.76	Dalibor Balgač	19 April 2003	Mt. SAC Relays	Walnut, United States	
10,000 m	28:24.32	Slavko Petrović	2 April 2005	European Cup 10000m	Barakaldo, Spain	
10 km (road)	29:01	Tomislav Novosel	2 November 2024	Croatian Road Running Championships	Zaprešić, Croatia	
15,000 m (track)	47:39.0	Slavko Petrović	3 March 2001		Zagreb, Croatia	
One hour	19139 m	Dorian Miškulin	2 April 2022		Zagreb, Croatia	
One hour	19365 m	Tomislav Novosel	11 April 2026		Rijeka, Croatia	
20,000 m (track)	1:05:19.2+	Dobrivoje Stojanović	4 November 1962		Osijek, Yugoslavia	
Half marathon	1:03:47	Drago Paripović	24 September 1993		Lago di Garda, Italy	
Half marathon	1:03:09	Mladen Kršek	30 October 1988		Carpi, Italy	
25,000 m (track)	1:22:39.4	Dobrivoje Stojanović	4 November 1962		Osijek, Yugoslavia	
30,000 m (track)	1:40:44.0	Mladen Mavar	15 April 1977		Varaždin, Yugoslavia	
Marathon	2:17:05	Drago Paripović	23 September 1992		Bologna, Italy	
50 km	2:57:08	Andrej Hladnik	2 March 2023	2nd Croatian 50km Championships	Slavonski Brod, Croatia	
6-hour run	87.277 km	Dejan Radanac	7 October 2023		Sarajevo, Bosnia and Herzegovina	
100 km	6:49:18	Dejan Radanac	2 March 2023	12nd Croatian 100km Championships	Slavonski Brod, Croatia	
12-hour run	158.224 km	Dejan Radanac	2 June 2024	I Feel Slovenia12Run	Kranj, Slovenia	
24-hour run	259.550 km	Zdravko Jadrijev	2 December 2023		Taipei, Taiwan	
110 m hurdles	13.54 (+1.9 m/s)	Jurica Grabušić	20 July 2003	Pedros Cup	Bydgoszcz, Poland	
200 m hurdles	24.50	Darko Juričić	30 August 1998		Brežice, Slovenia	
200 m hurdles	24.2 h	Željko Grabušić	11 September 1985		Ljubljana, Slovenia	
300 m hurdles	38.16	Lovro Šourek	17 May 2026	International Meeting Maribor and the Iztok Ciglarič Memorial	Maribor, Slovenia	
400 m hurdles	49.88	Darko Juričić	18 August 1998	European Championships	Budapest, Hungary	
2000 m steeplechase	5:37.00	Mladen Kršek	12 July 1980		Rijeka, Yugoslavia	
2000 m steeplechase	5:28.83	Bruno Belčić	31 May 2026	Goldenes Oval	Dresden, Germany	
3000 m steeplechase	8:39.25	Bruno Belčić	9 August 2025	IFAM	Oordegem, Belgium	
3000 m steeplechase	8:34.33	Bruno Belčić	1 August 2026	IFAM Oordegem	Oordegem, Belgium	
High jump	2.28 m	Novica Čanović	6 July 1985		Split, Yugoslavia	
Pole vault	5.71 m	Ivan Horvat	29 July 2018		Zagreb, Croatia	
Long jump	8.35 m (+1.5 m/s)	Filip Pravdica	11 May 2024	Memorial Matica Šuštaršiča	Kranj, Slovenia	
Triple jump	17.11 m (−0.1 m/s)	Đorđe Kožul	28 June 1987		Gothenburg, Sweden	
Shot put	21.94 m	Filip Mihaljević	5 June 2021	Croatian Championships	Karlovac, Croatia	
Discus throw	67.92 m	Martin Marić	17 May 2014		Chula Vista, United States	
Hammer throw	80.41 m	András Haklits	29 May 2005		Marietta, United States	
Javelin throw	82.70 m	Ivan Mustapić	25 July 1992		Zagreb, Croatia	
Decathlon	7841 pts	Roko Farkaš	21–22 June 2025	Hungarian Combined Events Championships	Budapest, Hungary	
Decathlon	100m (wind) / Long jump (wind) / Shot put / High jump / 400m / 110m H (wind) / Discus / Pole vault / Javelin / 1500m; 10.46 (+1.2 m/s) / 7.62 m (+0.1 m/s) / 12.71 m / 2.04 m / 47.60 / 14.21 (+0.1 m/s) / 36.26 m / 4.30 m / 51.07 m / 4:48.25					
5000 m walk (track)	21:03.04	Bruno Erent	17 May 2025	Agram International Meeting	Zagreb, Croatia	
5000 m walk (track)	20:24.43	Patrik Pivarski	16 May 2026	Agram International Meeting	Zagreb, Croatia	
10,000 m walk (track)	43:55.60	Bruno Erent	27 April 2024	Croatian 10000m Championships	Zagreb, Croatia	
10 km walk (road)	42:44.2 h	Radovan Ružić	18 September 1972		Križevci, Yugoslavia	
20,000 m walk (track)	1:34:20.0	Edmond Dobruna	11 May 2024	Agram - International Athletic Meeting	Zagreb, Croatia	
20 km walk (road)	1:28:05	Bruno Erent	5 October 2024	Croatian Race Walking Championships	Zagreb, Croatia	
35 km walk (road)	2:45:15	Bruno Erent	22 January 2022		Antalya, Turkey	
50 km walk (road)	4:05:02	Bruno Erent	23 March 2019	Dudinská Päťdesiatka	Dudince, Slovakia	
4 × 100 m relay	39.76	Croatia; Slaven Krajačić; Vjekoslav Oršolić; Dejan Vojnović; Tihomir Buinjac	29 July 2000		Zagreb, Croatia	
4 × 200 m relay	1:24.71	AK Sloboda Varaždin; Hrvoje Kašik; Karlo Marciuš; Janko Kišak; Roko Farkaš	4 May 2024	Croatian Relays Championships	Zagreb, Croatia	
4 × 400 m relay	3:05.42	Croatia; Elvis Peršić; Nino Habun; Frano Bakarić; Darko Juričić	25 July 2000		Ljubljana, Slovenia	
4 × 800 m relay	7:46.4 h	Dinamo Zagreb; Čavlek; Koščević; Čular; Murat	16 September 1956		Nova Gorica, Yugoslavia	
Distance medley relay	9:48.65	AK Dinamo-Zrinjecac Zagreb; Marino Bloudek; Karlo Videka; Nino Jambrešić; Tomislav Novosel	4 May 2024	Croatian Relays Championships	Zagreb, Croatia	
Distance medley relay	9:36.86	AK Dinamo-Zrinjecac Zagreb; Nino Jambrešić; Luka Vukobratović; Mate Frančula; Marino Bloudek	9 May 2026	Croatian Relays Championships	Zagreb, Croatia	
4 × 1500 m relay	16:08.2 h	Slavonija Osijek; Hanak; Subotić; Kokić; Adam	9 September 1962		Osijek, Yugoslavia	

=== Women ===
Event	Record	Athlete	Date	Meet	Place	Ref.
100 m	11.1 h NWI	Jelica Pavličić	1 June 1975		Zagreb, Yugoslavia	
100 m	11.30 (+1.1 m/s)	Andrea Ivančević	25 July 2015	Croatian Championships	Varaždin, Croatia	
200 m	23.14 NWI	Jelica Pavličić	3 August 1974		Sofia, Bulgaria	
300 m	37.08	Veronika Drljačić	14 May 2025	Dinamo Zrinjevac International Meeting	Zagreb, Croatia	
400 m	50.78	Danijela Grgić	17 August 2006	World Junior Championships	Beijing, China	
500 m	1:10.35	Natalija Švenda	10 September 2025		Karlovac, Croatia	
600 m	1:26.28	Nina Vuković	31 May 2023	International Night Athletic Meeting	Varaždin, Croatia	
800 m	1:56.51	Slobodanka Čolović Maričić	17 June 1987		Belgrade, Yugoslavia	
1500 m	4:09.14	Slobodanka Čolović Maričić	21 July 1987		Celje, Yugoslavia	
3000 m	9:07.60	Bojana Bjeljac	8 July 2023	Croatian Championships	Karlovac, Croatia	
5000 m	15:43.73	Bojana Bjeljac	29 May 2019		Regensburg, Germany	
5 km (road)	16:04	Matea Parlov Koštro	31 December 2022	BOclassic	Bolzano, Italy	
10,000 m	32:28.67	Bojana Bjeljac	20 May 2023	Night of the 10000m PB's	London, United Kingdom	
10 km (road)	31:54	Matea Parlov Koštro	30 July 2022		Berlin, Germany	
15 km (road)	49:26+	Lisa Stublić	17 March 2013	New York City Half Marathon	New York City, United States	
One hour	17129 m	Matea Parlov Koštro	30 March 2024		Zagreb, Croatia	
One hour	17590 m	Matea Parlov Koštro	11 April 2026		Rijeka, Croatia	
20 km (road)	1:05:38+	Lisa Stublić	17 March 2013	New York City Half Marathon	New York City, United States	
Half marathon	1:09:16	Lisa Nemec	16 November 2014		Zagreb, Croatia	
25 km (road)	1:25:12+ Mx	Bojana Bjeljac	4 December 2022	Valencia Marathon	Valencia, Spain	
30 km (road)	1:42:16+ Mx	Bojana Bjeljac	4 December 2022	Valencia Marathon	Valencia, Spain	
Marathon	2:23:39 Mx	Bojana Bjeljac	4 December 2022	Valencia Marathon	Valencia, Spain	
Marathon	2:28:42 Wo	Matea Parlov Koštro	15 August 2022	European Championships	Munich, Germany	
50 km	3:22:32	Nataša Šustić	2 March 2024		Slavonski Brod, Croatia	
100 km	7:13:30	Mirjana Šimek Bilić	1 March 2025		Slavonski Brod, Croatia	
6-hour run	83.323 km	Mirjana Šimek Bilić	9 November 2024	Croatian 6 & 12-hour run Championships	Zagreb, Croatia	
12-hour run	138.755 km	Ines Jozić	12 November 2022		Zagreb, Croatia	
24-hour run	238.032 km	Paula Vrdoljak	18 September 2022		Verona, Italy	
100 m hurdles	12.85 (+0.1 m/s)	Andrea Ivančević	4 September 2018	Hanžeković Memorial	Zagreb, Croatia	
300 m hurdles	40.92	Nikolina Horvat	22 May 2011		Koper, Slovenia	
400 m hurdles	56.01	Natalija Švenda	9 August 2025	IFAM Oordegem	Oordegem, Belgium	
2000 m steeplechase	6:37.94	Matea Parlov Koštro	18 September 2015		Novo Mesto, Slovenia	
3000 m steeplechase	10:02.20	Kristina Hendel	26 May 2018	IFAM Meeting	Oordegem, Belgium	
High jump	2.08 m	Blanka Vlašić	31 August 2009	Hanžeković Memorial	Zagreb, Croatia	
Pole vault	4.26 m	Elija Valentić	5 June 2021	Croatian Championships	Karlovac, Croatia	
Long jump	6.68 m (+1.0 m/s)	Silvija Mrakovčić	24 June 1990		Belgrade, Yugoslavia	
Triple jump	13.71 m (+1.4 m/s)	Silvija Mrakovčić	21 May 1995		Ljubljana, Slovenia	
Shot put	17.52 m	Valentina Mužarić	25 May 2013	NCAA Championships East Division	Greensboro, United States	
Discus throw	71.41 m	Sandra Perković	18 July 2017	Galà dei Castelli	Bellinzona, Switzerland	
Hammer throw	75.08 m	Ivana Brkljačić	27 June 2007		Warsaw, Poland	
Javelin throw	68.43 m	Sara Kolak	6 July 2017	Athletissima	Lausanne, Switzerland	
Heptathlon	6293 pts	Jana Koščak	27–28 May 2023	Hypo-Meeting	Götzis, Austria	
Heptathlon	100m H (wind) / High jump / Shot put / 200m (wind) / Long jump (wind) / Javelin / 800m; 13.26 (+1.2 m/s) / 1.92 m / 12.42 m / 24.14 (+0.9 m/s) / 6.24 m (+1.3 m/s) / 41.03 m / 2:21.20					
Heptathlon	6293 pts	Jana Koščak	9–10 August 2025	European U20 Championships	Tampere, Finland	
Heptathlon	100m H (wind) / High jump / Shot put / 200m (wind) / Long jump (wind) / Javelin / 800m; 13.69 (+0.8 m/s) / 1.92 m / 14.00 m / 25.17 (−1.2 m/s) / 5.94 m (+0.1 m/s) / 43.94 m / 2:14.56					
3000 m walk (track)	14:49.75	Bruna Janček	20 September 2020	Croatian U20 Championships	Zagreb, Croatia	
5000 m walk (track)	21:50.88	Lana Švarbić	17 May 2025	Agram International Meeting	Zagreb, Croatia	
10,000 m walk (track)	44:38.4 h	Ivana Renić	27 April 2024	Croatian Racewalking Championships	Zagreb, Croatia	
10 km walk (road)	47:43	Lana Švarbić	26 April 2025	Záhorácka Dvadsiatka	Borský Mikuláš, Slovakia	
20 km walk (road)	1:32:57	Ivana Renić	15 October 2022		Zagreb, Croatia	
35 km walk (road)	3:02:44+ (Note: not ratified by HAS but recognized by World Athletics)	Ivana Renić	23 March 2019	Dudinská Päťdesiatka	Dudince, Slovakia	
50 km walk (road)	4:20:17	Ivana Renić	23 March 2019	Dudinská Päťdesiatka	Dudince, Slovakia	
4 × 100 m relay	45.03	Croatia; Vita Penezić; Mia Wild; Melani Bosić; Veronika Drljačić	28 June 2025	European Team Championships	Maribor, Slovenia	
4 × 200 m relay	1:36.52	Sloboda Varaždin; Marija Hižman; Lucija Pokos; Kristina Dudek; Mateja Jambrović	13 June 2015	Croatian Club Team Championships	Zagreb, Croatia	
Swedish relay	2:11.53	Croatia; Klara Kapac; Jana Koščak; Vita Penezić; Mia Wild	28 July 2023	European Youth Olympic Festival	Maribor, Slovenia	
4 × 400 m relay	3:34.44	Croatia; Sandra Parlov; Anita Banović; Vanja Perišić; Danijela Grgić	24 June 2007		Zenica, Bosnia and Herzegovina	
Distance medley relay	11:31.54	Dinamo Zrinjevac; Maja Pačarić; Petra Grčević; Sara Vidaković; Bojana Bjeljac	22 May 2021		Zagreb, Croatia	

=== Mixed ===
Event	Record	Athlete	Date	Meet	Place	Ref.
4 × 100 m relay	43.24	AK Sloboda Varaždin; Dora Androlić; Karlo Marciuš; Nevia Fotak; Roko Farkaš	28 June 2025	Croatian Relays Championships	Zagreb, Croatia	
4 × 400 m relay	3:20.24	Croatia; Marko Orešković; Nina Vuković; Jakov Vuković; Veronika Drljačić	22 June 2023	European Team Championships	Chorzów, Poland	
Shuttle hurdle relay	54.27	AK Sloboda Varaždin; Roko Farkaš; Klara Koščak; Janko Kišak; Jana Koščak	4 May 2024	Croatian Relay Championships	Zagreb, Croatia	

== Indoor ==
=== Men ===
Event	Record	Athlete	Date	Meet	Place	Ref.
60 m	6.63	Dejan Vojnović	7 March 2003		Linz, Austria	
200 m	21.09	Roko Farkaš	30 January 2024	Czech Indoor Gala	Ostrava, Czech Republic	
200 m	21.07	Karlo Marciuš	12 February 2026	Indoor Spike	Ostrava, Czech Republic	
300 m	33.30	Karlo Marciuš	7 February 2026	Croatian U20 Championships - Senior Events	Zagreb, Croatia	
400 m	46.38	Luciano Sušanj	11 March 1973	European Championships	Rotterdam, Netherlands	
500 m	1:02.21	Mateo Ružić	25 February 2014	Prague Indoor	Prague, Czech Republic	
800 m	1:46.40	Predrag Melnjak	10 February 1988		Turin, Italy	
800 m	1:45.27	Marino Bloudek	3 February 2026	Czech Indoor Gala	Ostrava, Czech Republic	
800 m	1:45.19	Marino Bloudek	22 February 2026	Copernicus Cup	Toruń, Poland	
1000 m	2:20.35	Branko Zorko	4 February 1998		Erfurt, Germany	
1500 m	3:38.05	Branko Zorko	2 February 1997	Sparkassen Cup	Stuttgart, Germany	
3000 m	7:49.29	Branko Zorko	7 March 1990		Piraeus, Greece	
5000 m	14:18.35	Tomislav Novosel	17 February 2024	Croatian Championships	Zagreb, Croatia	
60 m hurdles	7.69	Jurica Grabušić	30 January 2010		Zagreb, Croatia	
60 m hurdles	7.69	Jurica Grabušić	27 February 2010	Croatian Championships	Zagreb, Croatia	
High jump	2.28 m (Note: outdoor mark ratified as absolute record)	Novica Čanović	25 February 1986		Thessaloniki, Greece	
Pole vault	5.76 m (Note: outdoor mark ratified as absolute record)	Ivan Horvat	25 February 2017	Balkan Championships	Belgrade, Serbia	
Long jump	8.08 m	Siniša Ergotić	8 February 2003		Budapest, Hungary	
Long jump	8.10 m (Note: no doping control)	Siniša Ergotić	16 February 2003		Ljubljana, Slovenia	
Triple jump	16.90 m	Đorđe Kožul	27 February 1988		Budapest, Hungary	
Shot put	21.84 m	Filip Mihaljević	27 February 2020	Serbian Open	Belgrade, Serbia	
Shot put	21.84 m	Filip Mihaljević	22 February 2022	Orlen Copernicus Cup	Toruń, Poland	
Weight throw	24.43 m	Andras Haklits	9 March 2001	NCAA Division I Championships	Fayetteville, United States	
Heptathlon	5667 pts	Trpimir Široki	29 January 2022	Texas Tech Open & Multis	Lubbock, United States	
Heptathlon	60m / Long jump / Shot put / High jump / 60m H / Pole vault / 1000m; 7.15 / 7.37 m / 13.20 m / 2.06 m / 8.11 / 4.85 m / 3:08.18					
3000 m walk	12:31.48	Bruno Erent	11 February 2023	Croatian U16 Championships	Zagreb, Croatia	
5000 m walk	20:27.01	Aleksandar Raković	13 February 1991		Turin, Italy	
4 × 200 m relay	1:26.80	AK Sloboda Varaždin; Roko Farkaš; Karlo Marciuš; Hrvoje Kašik; Janko Kišak	17 January 2024	Croatian Relays Championships	Zagreb, Croatia	
4 × 400 m relay	3:12.72	Croatia; Jakov Vuković; Marko Orešković; Mateo Ružić; Dominik Škorjanc	1 February 2022		Zagreb, Croatia	
Distance medley relay	9:58.84	AK Dinamo-Zrinjevac Zagreb; Marino Bloudek; Martin Leopold; Karlo Videka; Tomislav Novosel	17 January 2024	Croatian Relays Championships	Zagreb, Croatia	

=== Women ===
Event	Record	Athlete	Date	Meet	Place	Ref.
60 m	7.29	Andrea Ivančević	1 March 2015		Rijeka, Croatia	
60 m	7.29	Andrea Ivančević	1 March 2016	Serbia Open Meeting	Belgrade, Serbia	
200 m	24.11	Veronika Drljačić	11 February 2023	Croatian U16 Championships	Zagreb, Croatia	
200 m	23.86 (Note: doubtful timing)	Jelica Pavličić	February 1974		Budapest, Hungary	
400 m	52.47	Jelica Pavličić	22 February 1976	European Championships	Munich, West Germany	
600 m	1:27.45	Nina Vuković	12 February 2023	Croatian U16 Championships	Zagreb, Croatia	
800 m	1:59.83	Slobodanka Čolović	8 February 1987		Budapest, Hungary	
1000 m	2:49.63	Katarina Smiljanec	24 January 2014	Hokie Invitational	Blacksburg, United States	
1500 m	4:17.55	Ljiljana Ćulibrk	20 January 2001		Budapest, Hungary	
Mile	4:52.96	Katarina Smiljanec	17 January 2014	Virginia Tech Invitational	Blacksburg, United States	
3000 m	8:58.58	Bojana Bjeljac	4 February 2023	Zagreb Open Championships	Zagreb, Croatia	
5000 m	15:37.98	Bojana Bjeljac	18 February 2023	Croatian Championships	Zagreb, Croatia	
50 m hurdles	7.05	Ivana Lončarek	19 February 2020		Zagreb, Croatia	
60 m hurdles	7.91	Andrea Ivančević	18 March 2016	World Championships	Portland, United States	
High jump	2.06 m	Blanka Vlašić	6 February 2010	Hochsprung mit Musik	Arnstadt, Germany	
Pole vault	4.16 m (Note: outdoor mark ratified as absolute record)	Elija Valentić	30 January 2021		Mannheim, Germany	
Long jump	6.34 m (Note: record set during pentathlon competition)	Jana Koščak	4 February 2023	Tallinn Indoor Meeting	Tallinn, Estonia	
Long jump	6.36 m X	Silvija Mrakovčić	19 February 1994		Ljubljana, Slovenia	
Triple jump	13.55 m	Paola Borović	2 February 2019		Zagreb, Croatia	
Shot put	17.89 m A (Note: outdoor mark ratified as absolute record)	Valentina Mužarić	15 March 2014	NCAA Division I Championships	Albuquerque, United States	
Weight throw	20.81 m	Dorotea Habazin	5 March 2011	Virginia Tech Final Qualifier	Blacksburg, United States	
Pentathlon	4436 pts	Jana Koščak	4 February 2024	Tallinn Indoor Meeting	Tallinn, Estonia	
Pentathlon	60m H / High jump / Shot put / Long jump / 800m; 8.37 / 1.82 m / 11.40 m / 6.34 m / 2:21.69					
3000 m walk	13:31.71	Lana Švarbić	3 February 2024	Zagreb Open Championships	Zagreb, Croatia	
4 × 200 m relay	1:38.59	AK Agram Zagreb; Vita Penezić; Eva Mačković; Lara Jurčić; Ivana Lončarek	17 January 2024	Croatian Relays Championships	Zagreb, Croatia	
4 × 400 m relay	3:41.80	Croatia; Eva Mačković; Josipa Cecić; Ida Šimunčić; Veronika Drljačić	1 February 2022		Zagreb, Croatia	
Distance medley relay	11:39.26	AK Dinamo-Zrinjevac Zagreb; Dora Brzović; Josipa Cecić; Olja Galić; Bojana Bjeljac	1 February 2023	Croatian Relay Championships	Zagreb, Croatia	

=== Mixed ===
Event	Record	Athlete	Date	Meet	Place	Ref.
4 × 400 m relay	3:28.80	AK Agram Zagreb; Laura Matko; Eva Mačković; Marko Orešković; Jakov Vuković	17 January 2024	Croatian Relay Championships	Zagreb, Croatia	
