= Şilan Ayyıldız =

Turkish middle-distance runner

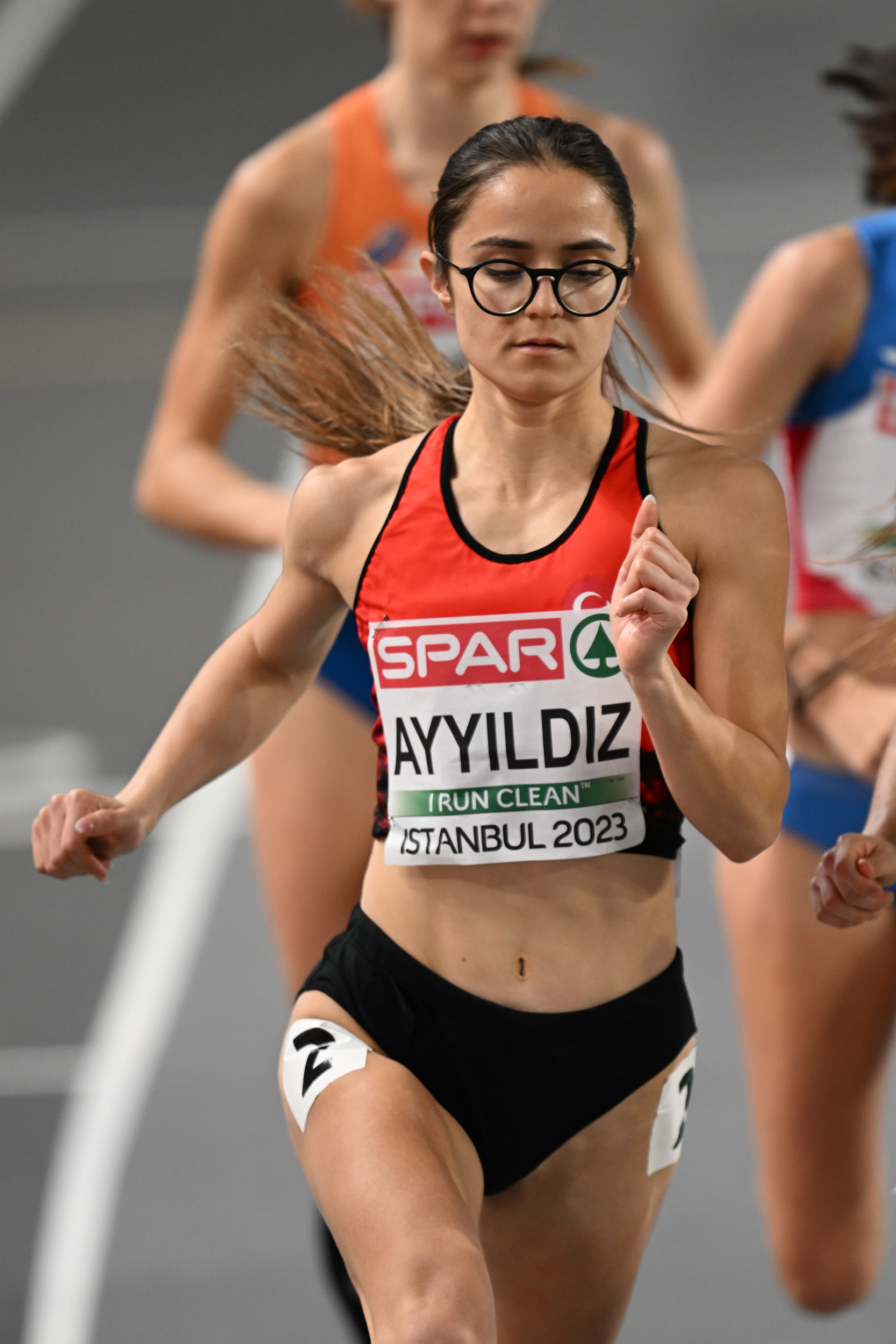

Personal information
- Nationality: Turkey
- Born: 10 October 1999 (age 26)

Sport
- Sport: Middle-distance, long-distance
- Club: Fenerbahçe

Achievements and titles
- Personal bests: outdoor: 400 m: 59.86 (1 August 2018); 800 m: 2:03.54 (12 June 2022); 1500 m: 4:10.59 (2 June 2022); 10 km: 33:12 (31 October 2021); 4 x 400 m relay:3:42:42 (19 June 2022); indoor: 800 m: 2:06.31 (26 February 2022); 1500 m: 4:11.55 (3 March 2023)
Medal record
Women's athletics
Representing Turkey
European Team Championships
Gold medal – first place	2025 Maribor	1500 m
Mediterranean Games
Bronze medal – third place	2026 Taranto	1500 m
Bronze medal – third place	2026 Taranto	5000 m
Bronze medal – third place	2026 Taranto	4 × 400 m relay
Balkan Championships
Gold medal – first place	2022 Craiova	1500 m
Balkan Indoor Championships
Gold medal – first place	2022 Istanbul	1500 m
Silver medal – second place	2018 Istanbul	800 m U20
Gold medal – first place	2018 Istanbul	1500 m U20
Summer Universiade
Bronze medal – third place	2021 Chengdu	1500 m

Şilan Ayyıldız (born 10 October 1999) is a Turkish female middle and long-distance track runner, who specializes in the 800m and 1500m events.

== Sports career ==
Ayyıldız began running in high school. She set a school record in 800m with 2:09 and in 1500m with 4:26.9. She took part in the 2017 ISF World Schools Athletics Championships in Nancy, France on 20–24 June, where she took the silver medal in the 800m event.

She gained her first international experience in 2017, when she was eliminated from the preliminary round of the 1500m event at the 2017 European Athletics U20 Championships in Grosseto, Italy on 20–23 July with a time of 4:35.96. That year in October, she took part in the 800m event at the International Athletics Championship held in Lefkoşa, Northern Cyprus. The following year, she won the U20 1500m at the Balkan Athletics Indoor Championships in Istanbul in 4:37.21, and took the silver medal in the U20 800m in 2:11.36. In 2021, she finished eleventh at the European Athletics U23 Championships in Tallinn, Estonia with 4:19.63 over 1500m, and was eliminated 800m with 2:16.86 min in the preliminary heat.

In April 2021, Ayyıldız won the 10 km maraton at the N Kolay International Marathon in Istanbul with 37:17, and in June 2022, she became Turkish U-23 champion in the 1500m event in Bursa.

In 2022, she won with 4:12.78 over 1500m at the Balkan Athletics Indoor Championships in Istanbul, and also at the outdoor championships in Craiova, Romania, she secured the gold medal in 4:17.27, and her team finished there the 4 × 400m relay event in fourth place with 3:42.42. In June 2022, she improved her "personal best" in the 1500m with a time of 4:10.59 at the Meeting International D'athlétisme de Montreuil in France organized by the European Athletic Association, and won the 1500m in 4:12.69 at the Motonet Grand Prix Espoo 2022 in Finland. She finished fifth at the 2022 Mediterranean Games in Oran, Algeria with a time of 4:14.45, and then dropped out of the first round at the 2022 World Athletics Championships in Eugene, Oregon, USA with a time of 4:12.67. In August 2022, she placed fourth in the 800m event at the Islamic Solidarity Games in Konya, Turkey with a time of 2:04.76, and finished the 1500m event in fifth place with 4:19.79.

She won the gold medal in the 1500m event with 4:17.02 at the 2025 European Athletics Team Championships Second Division in Maribor, Slovenia, and contributed to her team's record with 16 points.
