= Lucy Hatton =

British hurdler

Medal record

Women's athletics

Representing Great Britain

European Athletics Indoor Championships
Silver medal – second place	2015 Prague	60 m hurdles

Lucy Hatton (born 8 November 1994) is a British track and field athlete competing in the hurdles. She was the silver medallist in the 60 metres hurdles at the European Athletics Indoor Championships in 2015. Her personal best of 7.90 seconds in that event ranks her third on the British all-time lists.

== Career ==
Hatton took up athletics at a young age, joining Kettering Town Harriers at the age of nine. She later moved to Corby and she began working with coaches John Anderson and Alex Clarke at Corby Athletic Club. She took up a variety of events and aimed to become a heptathlete, but a back injury led her to focus on the sprint hurdles instead. She began to experience national level success in 2011, winning the hurdles titles at the English Schools Championships and the UK School Games.

She began studying criminology at the University of Leicester, but continued to compete in the hurdles as a student-athlete. She started to make an impact in the senior national ranks in 2012, making the 60 metres hurdles finals at the British Indoor Athletics Championships. The following year she was a national finalist both indoors and outdoors. She ended that year with a best of 13.62 seconds in the 100 metres hurdles. In 2014, she began working with a new coach, Jerzy Maciukiewicz, who also coached European hurdles medallist William Sharman. This coincided with much improvement. She was runner-up at the British Athletics Championships (setting a new best of 13.20 seconds) and was also the BUCS university championships runner-up.

Hatton began her 2015 season with great improvements in the indoor 60 m hurdles. Her opening race matched her personal best of 8.33 seconds and she lowered this to 8.06 seconds at the Copernicus Cup Toruń in Poland. She matched that time to take second to Serita Solomon at the British Indoor Championships, then secured the qualifying time for the 2015 European Athletics Indoor Championships with a time of 8.02 seconds at the Malmö Games at the end of February. In her international debut for Great Britain, she improved her personal best three times from 7.96, to 7.93, to 7.90 in the final; that last time brought her the silver medal behind the favourite Alina Talay. It also raised her to fourth in the global rankings for the season and third on the British all-time lists behind Tiffany Porter and Jessica Ennis.

== Personal bests ==
- 100 metres hurdles – 12.84 seconds (2015)
- 60 metres hurdles – 7.90 seconds (2015)

== International competitions ==
Year	Competition	Venue	Position	Event	Notes
2015	European Indoor Championships	Prague, Czech Republic	2nd	60 m hurdles	7.90
