= Serita Solomon =

British athlete

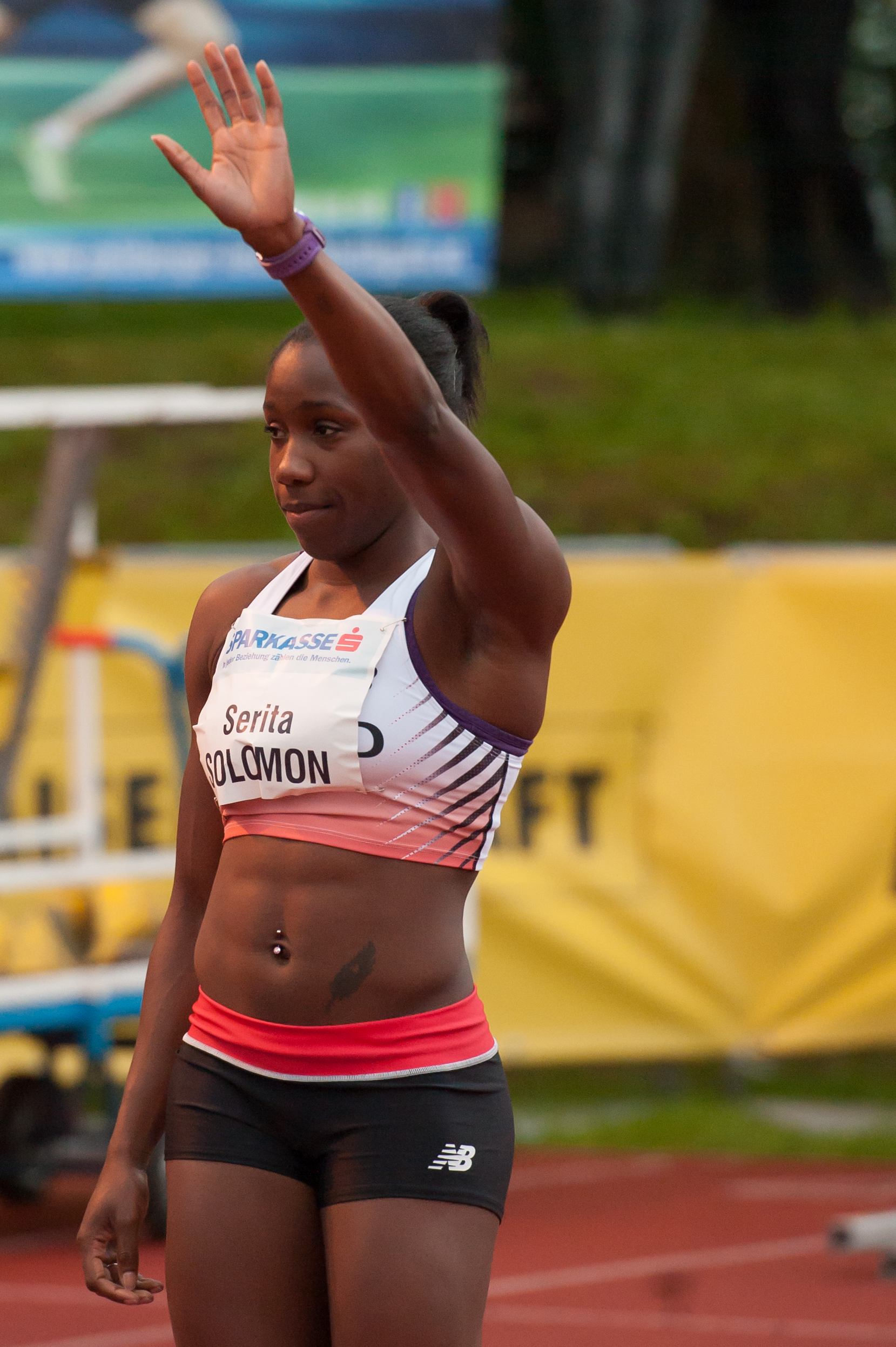

Medal record

Women's athletics

Representing Great Britain

European Athletics Indoor Championships
Bronze medal – third place	2015 Prague	60 m hurdles

Serita Solomon (born 1 March 1990) is a British track and field athlete competing in the hurdles. She was the bronze medallist in the 60 metres hurdles at the European Athletics Indoor Championships in 2015. Solomon holds a personal best of 12.87 seconds for the outdoor 100 metres hurdles and represented England in that event at the 2014 Commonwealth Games.

== Career ==
Born in Bromley, Solomon became involved in athletics at a young age, taking it up at primary school to follow in the footsteps of her older brother. She joined Blackheath and Bromley Harriers Athletic Club around 2005 and competed for the club in sprints and hurdles. She represented the club at the 2006 European Champion Clubs Cup for Juniors and placed second in the 100 metres hurdles. After an English junior title in that event in 2007, she returned to the European club competition in 2009 and won the B group hurdles race, as well as taking second in the 100 metres.

Working with successful British coach Lloyd Cowan, her first year as a senior athlete in 2010 did not go well: she failed to get past the heats at the British Indoor Athletics Championships and did not finish at the London Grand Prix meeting. This was also her first year of competition while studying at Middlesex University. Her 2011 season went much better. Starting indoors, she was a national finalist in the 60 m hurdles, then shared the British indoor universities title with Ashley Helsby with a new personal best of 8.40 seconds. Outdoors, she knocked three tenths of a second off her 100 m hurdles best with a run of 13.51 seconds in Bedford, then won the British under-23 title. A further improvement to 13.27 seconds came in July, but she was much slower in the British trials, coming last in the final. In 2012, she was the English senior champion and placed fifth at the British Olympic trials for the 2012 London Olympics, but did not qualify to compete at the event.

Solomon began edging nearer the top of the British elite in 2013, when she placed fourth at the British Indoor Championships, and improved her 60 m hurdles best to 8.16 seconds a week later at the Midland Counties Open. She lowered her outdoor best three times that season, to 13.23, then 13.21, and finally 13.09 seconds. The latter mark came in the heats of the British Athletics Championships, at which she was runner-up to Tiffany Porter. She did not improve her bests in 2014, but did place in the top three at the national championships, both indoors and out. This gained her her first international selection for England at the 2014 Commonwealth Games in Glasgow. At the games she missed qualifying for the final by one thousandth of a second and ultimately ranked tenth overall. She also represented Great Britain for the first time at the 2014 European Team Championships Super League, in which she placed eighth overall in the hurdles.

She had strong indoor form at the start of 2015, bringing her 60 m hurdles best down to 8.13 seconds, then 8.11 seconds. In the absence of Tiffany Porter, she was the winner of the British indoor title with a time of 8.04 seconds. This brought her a place on the team for the 2015 European Athletics Indoor Championships and she excelled, improving her personal best in the heat (8.03), semi-final (7.95), and then the final (7.93) – as a result, she took the bronze medal behind Alina Talay and fellow British athlete Lucy Hatton. This time raised her to fourth on the British all-time lists for the event, behind Porter, Jessica Ennis and Hatton.

== Personal bests ==
- 100 metres hurdles – 12.87 seconds (2015)
- 60 metres hurdles – 7.93 seconds (2015)

== International competitions ==
Year	Competition	Venue	Position	Event	Notes
2014	European Team Championships	Braunschweig, Germany	8th	100 m hurdles	13.22
2014	Commonwealth Games	Glasgow, Scotland	10th (qualifying)	100 m hurdles	13.38
2015	European Indoor Championships	Prague, Czech Republic	3rd	60 m hurdles	7.93
