= 2015 European Athletics Indoor Championships =

- Edition: 33rd
- Dates: 5–8 March
- Host city: Prague, Czech Republic
- Venue: O2 Arena
- Events: 26
- Participation: 614 athletes from 49 nations

The 2015 European Athletics Indoor Championships were held from 5 to 8 March 2015 in the O2 Arena in Prague, Czech Republic.

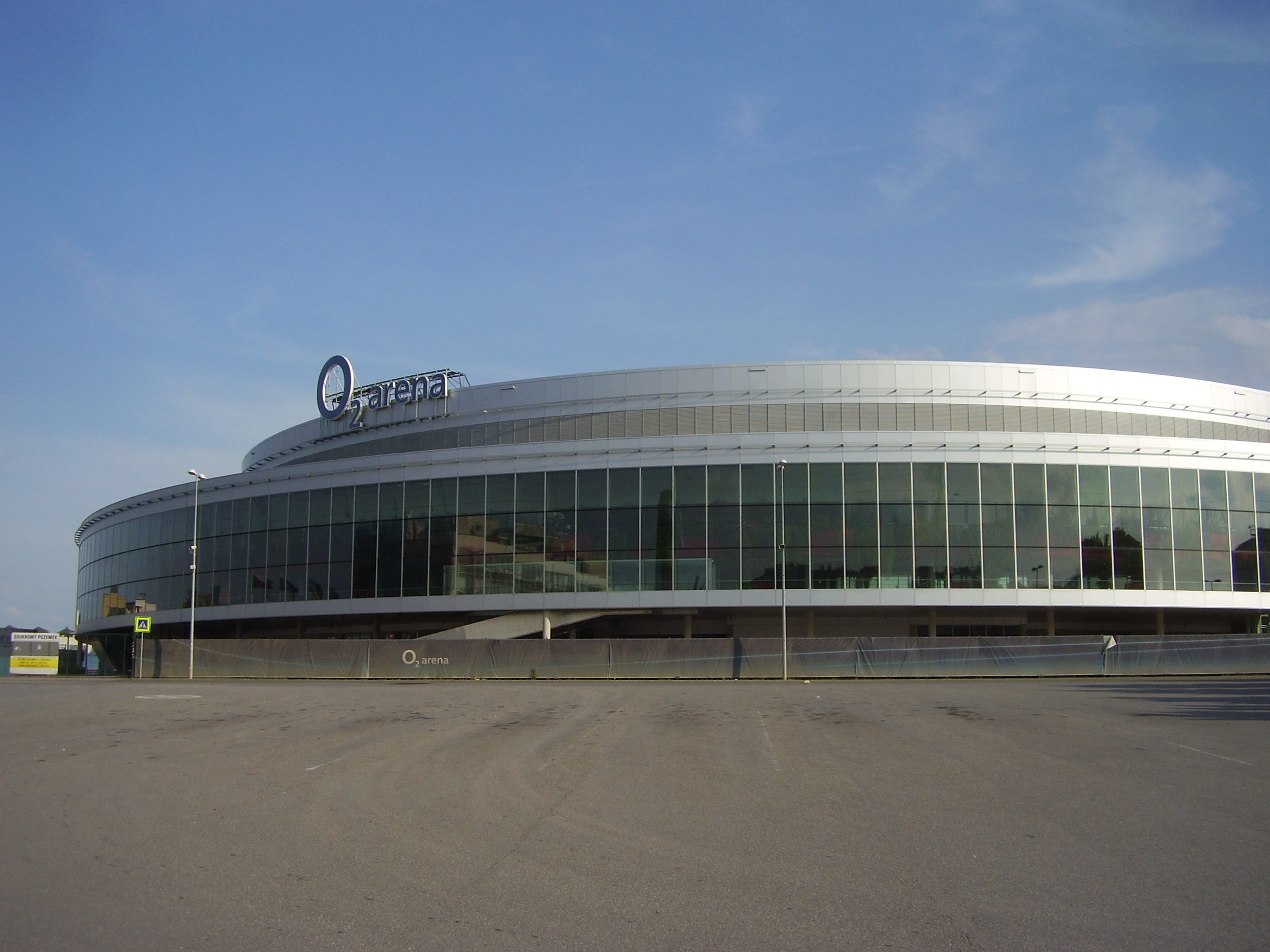
The outside of the O2 Arena which hosted the event.

== Bidding process ==
Prague was chosen as the host of the Championships on the European Athletics council meeting in Sofia, Bulgaria in May 2012. The other candidate city was Istanbul, Turkey. Previously, Prague hosted the 1967 European Indoor Games, the forerunner of the European Athletics Indoor Championships. It was the first time since the 1978 European Athletics Championships that Prague hosted a major athletics championships.

International athletics events in the Czech Republic traditionally took place away from Prague at the outdoor arena in Ostrava. That city's annual Golden Spike Ostrava meet began in 1961, and the 2011 European Athletics U23 Championships and 2007 World Youth Championships in Athletics were held in the preceding years. However, the annual Josef Odložil Memorial outdoor meeting in Prague has attracted international athletes since 1994.

== Preparation ==
Prior to the event, the O2 Arena in Prague was not a regular venue for indoor track and field. The stadium was host to the one-off "Meeting of World Record Holders" in 2009, which was the first international non-championship indoor meeting to be staged in the capital. A year before the championships, the Prague Indoor Meeting was staged as a test event and it received European Athletics permit status. This attracted top level performers and highlights included a European indoor record by high jumper Ivan Ukhov and a European indoor best for the 500 metres by home athlete Pavel Maslák.

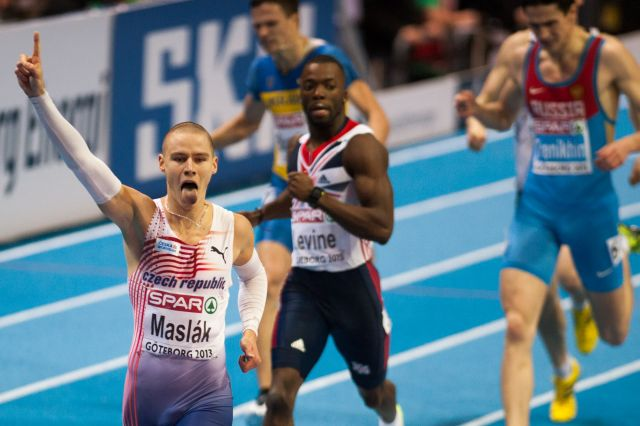
The leading Czech athlete, Pavel Maslák, winning his European indoor title in 2013

Maslák, the 400 m champion from the 2013 European Athletics Indoor Championships, led the Czech team for the championships, which at 46 athletes was the country's largest squad ever for the competition. Libor Varhaník, chairman of the organising committee, specifically aimed to have as many Czech athletes compete in the events as possible in order to build local interest and boost ticket sales. The opening ceremony was held on 5 March – a day before the main competition began on Friday (although shot put and men's long jump qualifying was held that evening). Former international high jumper and European indoor medallist Tomáš Janků was appointed as CEO and committee member of the organising group.

The event was televised live, with a total of 28 international broadcasters having agreements to show the proceedings either live or delayed. Eurosport was the most prominent of these in the competition's region, continuing its place as the traditional main broadcaster. A live internet feed of the event was also available on the European Athletics website. Retail chain Spar was the principal sponsor, reflecting the fact that it is the main commercial sponsor for the governing body. The event also had a dedicated social media presence in the form of a Facebook page and a Twitter feed (@praha2015), as well as an official website.

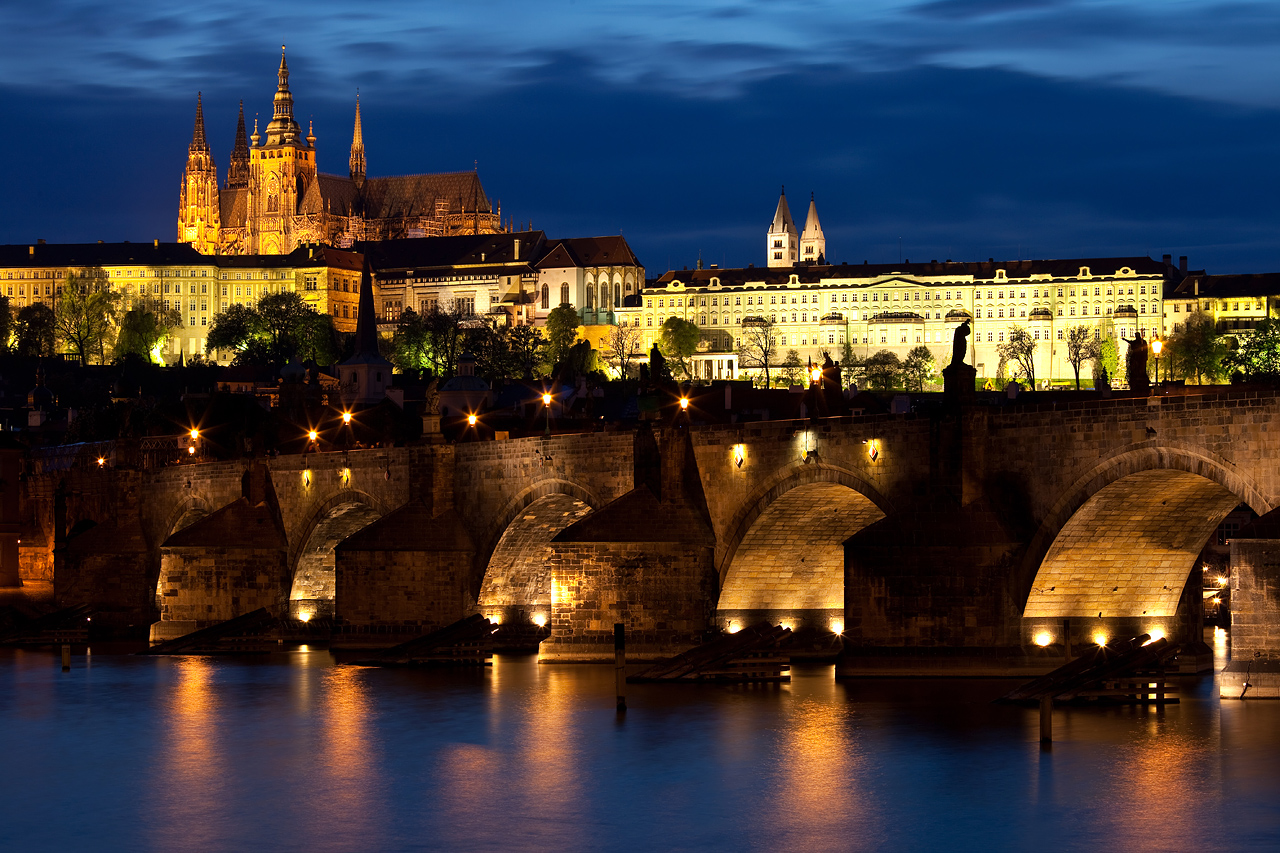
The view of the Hradčany district, which was inspiration for the event's logo

The competition logo incorporated a stylised version of the skyline of Hradčany – the district around Prague Castle and historical seat of government. The official mascot of the competition was the Little Mole (Krtek), the protagonist of a popular Czech cartoon series.

As the only major international indoor athletics event to be staged that year, the European Athletics Indoor Permit Meetings and (almost exclusively European-based) IAAF Indoor Permit Meetings served as the competitive build up for the event. In the absence of official qualifying standards, team selection was partially based on performances at national championships for some of the larger European nations.

== Men's results ==
=== Track ===
Event	Gold		Silver		Bronze	
60 metres	Richard Kilty; Great Britain	6.51 SB	Christian Blum; Germany	6.58	Julian Reus; Germany	6.60
400 metres	Pavel Maslák; Czech Republic	45.33 CR	Dylan Borlée; Belgium	46.25	Rafał Omelko; Poland	46.26
800 metres	Marcin Lewandowski; Poland	1:46.67	Mark English; Ireland	1:47.20	Thijmen Kupers; Netherlands	1:47.25
1500 metres	Jakub Holuša; Czech Republic	3:37.68 NR	Ilham Tanui Özbilen; Turkey	3:37.74	Chris O'Hare; Great Britain	3:38.96
3000 metres	Ali Kaya; Turkey	7:38.42	Lee Emanuel; Great Britain	7:44.48	Henrik Ingebrigtsen; Norway	7:45.54 NR
60 metres hurdles	Pascal Martinot-Lagarde; France	7.49	Dimitri Bascou; France	7.50	Wilhem Belocian; France	7.52
4 × 400 metres relay	Belgium; Julien Watrin; Dylan Borlée; Jonathan Borlée; Kevin Borlée	3:02.87 AR	Poland; Karol Zalewski; Rafał Omelko; Łukasz Krawczuk; Jakub Krzewina	3:02.97 NR	Czech Republic; Daniel Němeček; Patrik Šorm; Jan Tesař; Pavel Maslák	3:04.09 NR

=== Field ===
Event	Gold		Silver		Bronze	
High jump	Daniil Tsyplakov; Russia	2.31	Silvano Chesani; Italy Antonios Mastoras; Greece	2.31	Not awarded	
Pole vault	Renaud Lavillenie; France	6.04 CR	Aleksandr Gripich; Russia	5.85	Piotr Lisek; Poland	5.85
Long jump	Michel Tornéus; Sweden	8.30 NR	Radek Juška; Czech Republic	8.10	Andreas Otterling; Sweden	8.06
Triple jump	Nelson Évora; Portugal	17.21	Pablo Torrijos; Spain	17.04 NR	Marian Oprea; Romania	16.91
Shot put	David Storl; Germany	21.23	Asmir Kolašinac; Serbia	20.90	Ladislav Prášil; Czech Republic	20.66

=== Combined ===
Event	Gold		Silver		Bronze	
Heptathlon	Ilya Shkurenyov; Russia	6353 WL	Arthur Abele; Germany	6279	Eelco Sintnicolaas; Netherlands	6185

== Women's results ==
=== Track ===
Event	Gold		Silver		Bronze	
60 metres	Dafne Schippers; Netherlands	7.05 WL	Dina Asher-Smith; Great Britain	7.08 NR	Verena Sailer; Germany	7.09
400 metres	Nataliya Pyhyda; Ukraine	51.96	Indira Terrero; Spain	52.63	Seren Bundy-Davies; Great Britain	52.64
800 metres	Selina Büchel; Switzerland	2:01.95	Nataliya Lupu; Ukraine	2:02.25	Joanna Jóźwik; Poland	2:02.45
1500 metres	Sifan Hassan; Netherlands	4:09.04	Angelika Cichocka; Poland	4:10.53	Federica Del Buono; Italy	4:11.61
3000 metres^{[a]}	Sviatlana Kudzelich; Belarus	8:48.02	Maureen Koster; Netherlands	8:51.64	Laura Muir; Great Britain	8:52.24
60 metres hurdles	Alina Talay; Belarus	7.85 NR	Lucy Hatton; Great Britain	7.90	Serita Solomon; Great Britain	7.93
4 × 400 metres relay	France; Floria Gueï; Elea-Mariama Diarra; Agnès Raharolahy; Marie Gayot	3:31.61	Great Britain; Kelly Massey; Seren Bundy-Davies; Laura Maddox; Kirsten McAslan	3:31.79	Poland; Joanna Linkiewicz; Małgorzata Hołub; Monika Szczęsna; Justyna Święty	3:31.90

- ^{3000 metres} Gold medalist Yelena Korobkina of Russia was disqualified for doping in January 2024. Sviatlana Kudzelich of Belarus was upgraded to gold, Maureen Koster of Netherlands was upgraded to silver, and Laura Muir of Great Britain was awarded bronze.

=== Field ===
Event	Gold		Silver		Bronze	
High jump	Mariya Kuchina; Russia	1.97	Alessia Trost; Italy	1.97	Kamila Lićwinko; Poland	1.94
Pole vault	Anzhelika Sidorova; Russia	4.80	Ekaterini Stefanidi; Greece	4.75	Angelica Bengtsson; Sweden	4.70 NR
Long jump	Ivana Španović; Serbia	6.98 NR	Sosthene Taroum Moguenara; Germany	6.83	Florentina Marincu; Romania	6.79
Triple jump	Yekaterina Koneva; Russia	14.69	Gabriela Petrova; Bulgaria	14.52	Hanna Knyazyeva-Minenko; Israel	14.49 NR
Shot put	Anita Márton; Hungary	19.23 NR	Yuliya Leantsiuk; Belarus	18.60	Radoslava Mavrodieva; Bulgaria	17.83

=== Combined ===
Event	Gold		Silver		Bronze	
Pentathlon	Katarina Johnson-Thompson; Great Britain	5000 NR CR	Nafissatou Thiam; Belgium	4696	Eliška Klučinová; Czech Republic	4687 NR

== Medal table ==
The host country is highlighted in blue

Rank	Nation	Gold	Silver	Bronze	Total
1	Russia (RUS)	6	1	0	7
2	France (FRA)	3	1	1	5
3	Great Britain (GBR)	2	4	3	9
4	Czech Republic (CZE)*	2	1	3	6
5	Netherlands (NED)	2	0	3	5
6	Germany (GER)	1	3	2	6
7	Poland (POL)	1	2	5	8
8	Belarus (BLR)	1	2	0	3
8	Belgium (BEL)	1	2	0	3
10	Serbia (SRB)	1	1	0	2
10	Turkey (TUR)	1	1	0	2
10	Ukraine (UKR)	1	1	0	2
13	Sweden (SWE)	1	0	2	3
14	Hungary (HUN)	1	0	0	1
14	Portugal (POR)	1	0	0	1
14	Switzerland (SUI)	1	0	0	1
17	Italy (ITA)	0	2	1	3
18	Greece (GRE)	0	2	0	2
18	Spain (ESP)	0	2	0	2
20	Bulgaria (BUL)	0	1	1	2
21	Ireland (IRL)	0	1	0	1
22	Romania (ROM)	0	0	2	2
23	Israel (ISR)	0	0	1	1
23	Norway (NOR)	0	0	1	1
Totals (24 entries)		26	27	25	78

== Placing table ==
Points were awarded for every place in the top eight of each event: 8 for 1st, 7 for 2nd, 6 for 3rd, etc.

Rank	Nation	1st	2nd	3rd	4th	5th	6th	7th	8th	Total
1	Russia	48	14	–	20	–	9	4	1	96
2	Germany	8	21	12	20	12	9	2	2	86
3	Great Britain	16	28	18	5	12	6	–	–	85
4	Poland	8	14	24	20	4	9	2	2	83
5	France	24	7	6	5	16	6	2	–	66
6	Czech Republic	16	7	18	5	8	3	4	2	63
7	Spain	–	14	–	10	8	3	2	1	38
8	Netherlands	16	–	18	–	–	–	2	1	37
9	Belarus	8	14	–	10	–	–	4	–	36
10	Italy	–	14	6	5	–	3	4	–	32
11	Ukraine	8	–	6	–	8	6	2	1	31
12	Greece	–	14	–	5	8	3	–	–	30
13	Sweden	8	–	12	5	–	–	–	1	26
14	Belgium	8	14	–	–	–	–	–	–	22
15	Bulgaria	–	7	6	–	4	–	2	1	20
16	Romania	–	–	12	5	–	3	–	–	20
17	Norway	–	–	6	5	4	3	–	–	18
18	Turkey	8	7	–	–	–	–	2	–	17
19	Switzerland	8	–	–	–	8	–	–	–	16
20	Serbia	8	7	–	–	–	–	–	–	15
21	Hungary	8	–	–	–	–	3	2	1	14
22	Portugal	8	–	–	–	4	–	–	–	12
23	Ireland	–	7	–	–	–	3	2	–	12
24	Finland	–	–	–	–	4	3	–	1	8
25	Israel	–	–	6	–	–	–	–	–	6
=26	Lithuania	–	–	–	5	–	–	–	–	5
=26	Slovakia	–	–	–	5	–	–	–	–	5
=28	Iceland	–	–	–	–	4	–	–	–	4
=28	Luxembourg	–	–	–	–	4	–	–	–	4
30	Croatia	–	–	–	–	–	–	4	–	4
=31	Estonia	–	–	–	–	–	–	–	1	1
=31	Latvia	–	–	–	–	–	–	–	1	1
=31	Slovenia	–	–	–	–	–	–	–	1	1

== Records ==
Athlete	Nation	Event	Performance	Type	Date
Stipe Žunić	Croatia	Shot put	20.67 m	NR	5 March
Bob Bertemes	Luxembourg	Shot put	20.56 m	NR	5 March
Katarina Johnson-Thompson	Great Britain	Pentathlon high jump	1.95 m	Championship best	6 March
Katarina Johnson-Thompson	Great Britain	Pentathlon long jump	6.89 m	World best	6 March
Katarina Johnson-Thompson	Great Britain	Pentathlon	5000 pts	CR	6 March
Katarina Johnson-Thompson	Great Britain	Pentathlon	5000 pts	NR	6 March
Eliška Klučinová	Czech Republic	Pentathlon	4687 pts	NR	6 March
Andrea Ivančević	Croatia	60 m hurdles	8.02	NR	6 March
João Carlos Almeida	Portugal	60 m hurdles	7.66	NR=	6 March
Iveta Putalová	Slovakia	400 m	53.28	NR	6 March
Amaliya Sharoyan	Armenia	400 m	54.24	NR	6 March
Aníta Hinriksdóttir	Iceland	800 m	2:01.56	NR	6 March
Andrea Ivančević	Croatia	60 m hurdles	7.97	NR	6 March
Nooralotta Neziri	Finland	60 m hurdles	7.98	NR=	6 March
Kira Grünberg	Austria	Pole vault	4.45 m	NR	6 March
Gina Reuland	Luxembourg	Pole vault	4.30 m	NR	6 March
Andreas Martinsen	Denmark	60 m hurdles	7.73	NR	6 March
Aliaksandr Linnik	Belarus	400 m	46.78	NR	6 March
Iveta Putalová	Slovakia	400 m	52.99	NR	6 March
Michel Tornéus	Sweden	Long jump	8.30 m	NR	6 March
Alina Talay	Belarus	60 m hurdles	7.85	NR	6 March
Nooralotta Neziri	Finland	60 m hurdles	7.97	NR	6 March
Tiffany Tshilumba	Luxembourg	60 m	7.38	NR	7 March
Hanna Knyazyeva-Minenko	Israel	Triple jump	14.40	NR	7 March
Dmitrijs Jurkevičs	Latvia	1500 m	3:42.84	NR	7 March
Ivana Španović	Serbia	Long jump	6.98 m	NR	7 March
Florentina Marincu	Romania	Long jump	6.79 m	AJR	7 March
Renaud Lavillenie	France	Pole vault	6.04 m	CR	7 March
Anita Márton	Hungary	Shot put	19.23 m	NR	7 March
Pablo Torrijos	Spain	Triple jump	17.04 m	NR	7 March
Sandra Eriksson	Finland	3000 m	8:54.06	NR	7 March
Iveta Putalová	Slovakia	400 m	52.84	NR	7 March
Pavel Maslák	Czech Republic	400 m	45.33	CR	7 March
Ali Kaya	Turkey	3000 m	7:38.42	CR	7 March
Henrik Ingebrigtsen	Norway	3000 m	7:45.54	NR	7 March
Mujinga Kambundji	Switzerland	60 m	7.15	NR	8 March
Ewa Swoboda	Poland	60 m	7.22	AJR=	8 March
Pascal Mancini	Switzerland	60 m	6.60	NR=	8 March
Angelica Bengtsson	Sweden	Pole vault	4.70 m	NR	8 March
Hanna Knyazyeva-Minenko	Israel	Triple jump	14.49 m	NR	8 March
Jakub Holuša	Czech Republic	1500 m	3:37.68	NR	8 March
Henrik Ingebrigtsen	Norway	1500 m	3:39.70	NR	8 March
Dina Asher-Smith	Great Britain	60 m	7.08	NR=	8 March
Ezinne Okparaebo	Norway	60 m	7.10	NR	8 March
Mujinga Kambundji	Switzerland	60 m	7.11	NR	8 March
Ewa Swoboda	Poland	60 m	7.20	AJR	8 March
Julien Watrin; Dylan Borlée; Jonathan Borlée; Kevin Borlée	Belgium	4 × 400 m relay	3:02.87	AR	8 March
Karol Zalewski; Rafał Omelko; Łukasz Krawczuk; Jakub Krzewina	Poland	4 × 400 m relay	3:02.97	NR	8 March
Daniel Němeček; Patrik Šorm; Jan Tesař; Pavel Maslák	Czech Republic	4 × 400 m relay	3:04.09	NR	8 March

== Participating nations ==
- Albania (2)
- Andorra (2)
- Armenia (2)
- Austria (7)
- Azerbaijan (2)
- Belarus (15)
- Belgium (12)
- Bosnia and Herzegovina (3)
- Bulgaria (13)
- Croatia (3)
- Cyprus (6)
- Czech Republic (45) (Host)
- Denmark (12)
- Estonia (8)
- Finland (7)
- France (26)
- Georgia (4)
- Germany (39)
- Gibraltar (1)
- Great Britain (35)
- Greece (11)
- Hungary (11)
- Iceland (5)
- Ireland (12)
- Israel (4)
- Italy (22)
- Latvia (11)
- Lithuania (6)
- Luxembourg (4)
- Macedonia (2)
- Malta (2)
- Moldova (2)
- Monaco (1)
- Montenegro (2)
- Netherlands (17)
- Norway (12)
- Poland (42)
- Portugal (7)
- Romania (16)
- Russia (41)
- San Marino (1)
- Serbia (6)
- Slovakia (27)
- Slovenia (12)
- Spain (30)
- Sweden (24)
- Switzerland (7)
- Turkey (10)
- Ukraine (23)
