= Paola Borović =

Croatian long and triple jumper (born 1995)

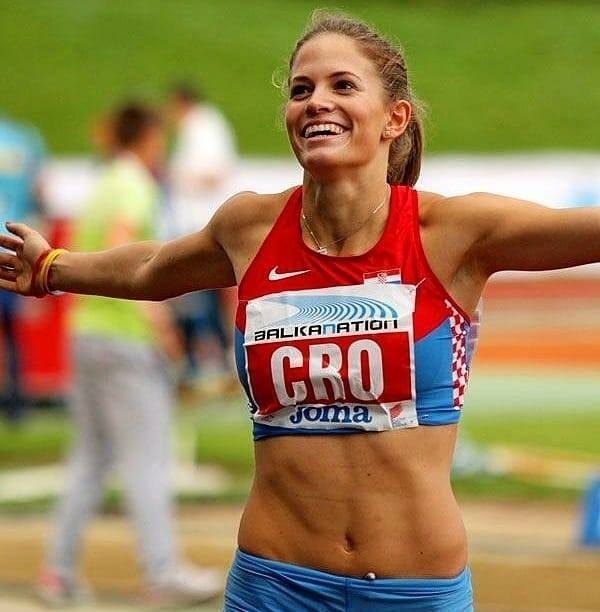

Personal information
- Nationality: Croatia
- Born: 26 June 1995 (31 years, 133 days old) Zadar
- Education: PhD Faculty of Economics and Business, University of Zagreb

Sport
- Sport: Athletics
- Events: Triple jump Long jump
- Club: Dinamo Zrinjevac
- Coached by: Siniša Ergotić

Achievements and titles
- National finals: 2010 Croatian U18s; • Long jump, 1st (gold); 2011 Croatian Indoors; • Long jump, 4th; 2011 Croatian U20s; • Triple jump, 1st (gold); 2012 Croatian Indoor U20s; • Triple jump, 1st (gold); 2012 Croatian Indoors; • Triple jump, 3rd (bronze); 2013 Croatian Indoor U20s; • Triple jump, 1st (gold); 2013 Croatian Indoors; • Triple jump, 2nd (silver); 2013 Croatian Champs; • Triple jump, 2nd (silver); • Long jump, 3rd (bronze); 2013 Croatian U20s; • Triple jump, 1st (gold); 2013 Croatian U20s; • Triple jump, 12.39; 2014 Croatian Indoor U20s; • Long jump, 1st (gold); • Triple jump, 1st (gold); 2014 Croatian Indoors; • Long jump, 3rd (bronze); • Triple jump, 1st (gold); 2014 Croatian U20s; • Triple jump, 1st (gold); 2014 Croatian Champs; • Triple jump, 1st (gold); • Long jump, 1st (gold); 2014 Croatian U23s; • Triple jump, 1st (gold); • Long jump, 1st (gold); 2015 Croatian Indoor U23s; • Long jump, 1st (gold); • Triple jump, 1st (gold); 2015 Croatian Indoors; • Long jump, 1st (gold); • Triple jump, 1st (gold); 2015 Croatian Champs; • Triple jump, 1st (gold); • Long jump, 1st (gold); 2015 Croatian U23s; • Triple jump, 1st (gold); • Long jump, 1st (gold); 2016 Croatian Indoor U23s; • Long jump, 1st (gold); • Triple jump, 1st (gold); 2016 Croatian Indoors; • Long jump, 1st (gold); • Triple jump, 1st (gold); 2016 Croatian Champs; • Triple jump, 1st (gold); • Long jump, 1st (gold); 2017 Croatian Indoors; • Long jump, 1st (gold); • Triple jump, 1st (gold); 2017 Croatian Champs; • Triple jump, 1st (gold); • Long jump, 1st (gold); 2017 Croatian U23s; • Triple jump, 1st (gold); • Long jump, 1st (gold); 2018 Croatian Indoors; • Long jump, 2nd (silver); • Triple jump, 1st (gold); 2018 Croatian Champs; • Triple jump, 1st (gold); 2019 Croatian Indoors; • Long jump, 1st (gold); • Triple jump, 1st (gold); 2019 Croatian Champs; • Triple jump, 1st (gold); • Long jump, 1st (gold); 2020 Croatian Indoors; • Long jump, 1st (gold); • Triple jump, 1st (gold); 2020 Croatian Champs; • Triple jump, 1st (gold); • Long jump, 1st (gold); 2021 Croatian Indoors; • Triple jump, 1st (gold); 2021 Croatian Champs; • Triple jump, 1st (gold); 2022 Croatian Indoors; • Triple jump, 1st (gold); 2022 Croatian Champs; • Triple jump, 1st (gold); 2023 Croatian Indoors; • Triple jump, 1st (gold); 2023 Croatian Champs; • Triple jump, 1st (gold); • Long jump, 1st (gold); 2024 Croatian Indoors; • Triple jump, 1st (gold); 2025 Croatian Champs; • Triple jump, 1st (gold); 2026 Croatian Indoors; • Triple jump, 1st (gold)
- Personal bests: TJ: 13.66 (+0.9) (2026); LJ: 6.36 (+1.6) (2016)
Medal record
Women's athletics
Representing Croatia
Balkan Championships
Bronze medal – third place	2018 Stara Zagora	Triple jump
Balkan Indoor Championships
Bronze medal – third place	2018 Istanbul	Triple jump
Bronze medal – third place	2019 Istanbul	Triple jump
Silver medal – second place	2020 Istanbul	Triple jump
- Updated on 1 January 2024

Paola Borović (born 26 June 1995) is a Croatian long and triple jumper. She is a 35-time senior national champion - eighteen times at the Croatian Athletics Championships outdoors, and seventeen times at the indoor national championships.

== Biography ==
Paola Borović first gained international experience in 2011, when she competed in the World Youth Championships near Lille, finishing eighth in the triple jump with a distance of 12.82 m and failing to make a valid attempt in the long jump qualification. Subsequently, she reached ninth place in the triple jump with 12.24 m at the European Youth Olympic Festival (EYOF) in Trabzon. In 2013, she was eliminated in the triple jump qualification at the European Junior Championships in Rieti with a distance of 12.74 m, and at the World Junior Championships in Eugene in 2014, she did not advance past the preliminary round with 5.83 m in the long jump and 13.02 m in the triple jump.

In 2015, she finished ninth in the triple jump with 13.21 m at the U23 European Championships in Tallinn, and again failed to make a valid attempt in the long jump qualification. She then ranked seventh in both the long jump with 5.98 m and triple jump with 13.11 m at the Balkan Championships in Pitești. The following year, she finished fourth in both events at the Balkan Championships in the same location, with 6.36 m in the long jump and 13.25 m in the triple jump. At the 2017 Balkan Indoor Championships in Belgrade, she placed fourth in the triple jump with 13.39 m and then was eliminated in the long jump qualification with 6.14 m and finished tenth in the triple jump with 13.14 m at the U23 European Championships in Bydgoszcz. The next year, she won the bronze medal in the triple jump with 13.43 m at the Balkan Indoor Championships in Istanbul, and also secured the bronze medal in the outdoor championships in Stara Zagora with a distance of 13.55 m, while finishing seventh in the long jump with 6.12 m.

In 2019, she again won the bronze medal in the triple jump with 13.38 m at the Balkan Indoor Championships in Istanbul, and the following year, she won the silver medal with 13.54 m at the Indoor Championships in the same city. At the outdoor championships in Cluj-Napoca, she placed fourth in the triple jump with 13.42 m and seventh in the long jump with 6.01 m. In 2021, she finished fifth at the Balkan Indoor Championships in Istanbul with a jump of 13.37 m, and in late June, she ranked eighth at the Outdoor Championships in Smederevo with 12.96 m. The following year, she placed fourth in the triple jump with 13.48 m at the Balkan Indoor Championships in Istanbul, and in June, she finished tenth at the Balkan Championships in Craiova with 12.96 m. Subsequently, she was eliminated without a valid attempt in the qualifying round of the European Championships in Munich. In 2023, she missed qualifying for the final with 13.24 m at the European Indoor Championships in Istanbul. In 2026, she represented Croatia in the women's triple jump at the European Championships in Birmingam competing despite a sprained ankle.

Paola Borović is coached by Siniša Ergotić.

== Statistics ==
=== Personal bests ===
Event	Mark	Place	Competition	Venue	Date	Ref
Long jump	6.36 m (+1.6 m/s)	4th	Balkan Athletics Championships	Pitești, Romania	26 June 2016	
Triple jump	13.66 m (+0.9 m/s)	2nd place, silver medalist(s)	Croatian Athletics Championships	Celje, Slovenia	10 June 2026	
