= 2022 Balkan Athletics Championships =

- Dates: 18–19 June
- Host city: Craiova, Romania
- Venue: Nicolae Mărășescu Athletics Stadium
- Level: Senior
- Events: 42

The 2022 Balkan Athletics Championships was the 75th edition of the annual track and field competition for athletes from the Balkans, organised by Balkan Athletics. It was held on 18 and 19 June at the Nicolae Mărășescu Athletics Stadium in Craiova, Romania.

== Medal summary ==
=== Men ===
Event	Gold		Silver		Bronze	
100 metres (wind: -0.4 m/s)	Kayhan Özer (TUR)	10.31	Ioannis Nyfantopoulos (GRE)	10.37	Ertan Özkan (TUR)	10.44
200 metres	Boško Kijanović (SRB)	20.94	Blessing Afrifah (ISR)	20.98	Panayiotis Trivizas (GRE)	21.05
400 metres	Mihai Sorin Dringo (ROU)	45.79	Oleksandr Pohorilko (UKR)	45.86	Boško Kijanović (SRB)	45.98
800 metres	Jan Vukovič (SLO)	1:47.94	Hristos Kotitsas (GRE)	1:48.36	Salih Teksöz (TUR)	1:48.51 PB
1500 metres	Yervand Mkrtchyan (ARM)	3:41.89	Marino Bloudek (CRO)	3:42.55	Kevin Kamenschak (AUT)	3:43.03
3000 metres	Ramazan Barbaros (TUR)	8:12.60	Dino Bošnjak (CRO)	8:13.69	Ömer Amaçtan (TUR)	8:14.40
5000 metres	Dino Bošnjak (CRO)	13:50.85	Dario Ivanovski (MKD)	13:56.59	Sezgin Ataç (TUR)	13:58.76
110 metres hurdles	Mikdat Sevler (TUR)	13.80	Luka Trgovčević (SRB)	14.00	Alin Ionuţ Anton (ROU)	14.17
400 metres hurdles	Niklas Strohmayer-Dangl (AUT)	50.72	Stjepan Jan Cik (CRO)	51.06	Adam Yakobi (ISR)	51.56
3000 metres Steeplechase	Hilal Yego (TUR)	8:43.24	Bruno Belčić (CRO)	8:57.03	Georgios Stamoulis (GRE)	9:00.39
4 × 100 metres relay	Romania; Petre Rezmives; Alin Ionuţ Anton; Ionut Andrei Neagoe; Marian Valentin Tanase	39.50	Serbia; Strahinja Jovančević; Boško Kijanović; Stefan Kaljuš; Aleksa Kijanović	39.85	Greece; Konstantinos Zikos; Nikolaos Ebeoglou; Panayiotis Trivizas; Vasilios Mirianthopoulos	39.86
4 × 400 metres relay	Ukraine; Oleksiy Pozdnyakov; Danylo Danylenko; Mykyta Barabanov; Oleksandr Pohorilko	3:05.96	Turkey; Oğuzhan Kaya; Oğuz Akgül; Salih Teksöz; Kubilay Ençü	3:08.48	Slovenia; Jure Grkman; Lovro Mesec Košir; Gregor Grahovac; Rok Ferlan	3:08.96
High jump	Tihomir Ivanov (BUL)	2.21	Vadym Kravchuk (UKR)	2.21	Adonios Merlos (GRE)	2.18
Pole vault	Robert Renner (SLO)	5.61	Ivan Horvat (CRO)	5.30	Petros Hatziou (GRE)	5.30
Long jump	Gabriel Bitan (ROU)	8.07	Valentin Toboc (ROU)	8.03	Filip Pravdica (CRO)	8.00
Triple jump	Nikolaos Andrikopoulos (GRE)	16.29	Artem Konovalenko (UKR)	16.04	Andreas Pantazis (GRE)	16.00
Shot put	Andrei Toader (ROU)	20.75	Alperen Karahan (TUR)	20.20	Giorgi Mujaridze (GEO)	19.76
Discus Throw	Alin Firfirică (ROU)	64.95	Mykyta Nesterenko (UKR)	61.97	Apostolos Parellis (CYP)	61.58
Hammer Throw	Myhaylo Havrylyuk (UKR)	75.49	Serghei Marghiev (MDA)	75.24	Özkan Baltacı (TUR)	74.24
Javelin Throw	Alexandru Novac (ROU)	83.01	Dimitrios Tsitsos (GRE)	77.51	Denis Adrian Both (ROU)	76.47
Decathlon	Aris-Nikolaos Peristeris (GRE)	7887	Ariel Attias (ISR)	7163	Dragan Pešić (MNE)	7010
WR world record | AR area record | CR championship record | GR games record | NR national record | OR Olympic record | PB personal best | SB season best | WL world leading (in a given season)

=== Women ===
Event	Gold		Silver		Bronze	
100 metres (wind: -0.7 m/s)	Diana Vaisman (ISR)	11.34	Rafailia Spanoudaki-Hatziriga (GRE)	11.53	Milana Tirnanić (SRB)	11.70
200 metres	Rafailia Spanoudaki-Chatziriga (GRE)	23.55	Olivia Fotopoulou (CYP)	23.62	Magdalena Lindner (AUT)	24.11
400 metres	Susanne Walli (AUT)	52.49	Büşra Yıldırım (TUR)	52.88	Mirela Lavric (ROU)	53.20
800 metres	Claudia Bobocea (ROU)	2:01.84	Anita Horvat (SLO)	2:02.05	Ekaterina Guliyev (TUR)	2:02.38
1500 metres	Şilan Ayyıldız (TUR)	4:17.27	Maria Claudia Florea (ROU)	4:17.81	Lenuta Simiuc (ROU)	4:18.17
3000 metres	Emine Hatun Tuna (TUR)	9:30.97	Fatma Arik (TUR)	9:33.10	Greza Bakraqi (KOS)	9:33.74
5000 metres	Luiza Gega (ALB)	15:16.47 CR NR	Yayla Kiliç (TUR)	15:55.24	Thalia Charalambous (CYP)	16:27.44
100 metres hurdles	Anais Karagianni (GRE)	13.15	Anja Lukić (SRB)	13.29	Elisavet Pesiridou (GRE)	13.29
400 metres hurdles	Agata Zupin (SLO)	57.05	Lena Pressler (AUT)	57.45	Dimitra Gnafaki (GRE)	57.50
3000 metres Steeplechase	Luiza Gega (ALB)	9:17.89 CR	Claudia Prisecaru (ROU)	9:51.26	Ruken Tek (TUR)	9:51.48
4 × 100 metres relay	Greece; Dimitra Tsoukala; Elisavet Pesiridou; Alana Bern; Rafailia Spanoudaki-Hatziriga	44.56	Austria; Johanna Plank; Susanne Walli; Viktoria Willhuber; Magdalena Lindner	44.72	Israel; Nitzan Asas; Diana Vaisman; Allina Drottman; Eden Finkelstein	45.20
4 × 400 metres relay	Greece; Despina Mourta; Maria-Myrta Argyrou; Anna Kiafa; Andrianna Ferra	3:34.29	Croatia; Klara Koščak; Nina Vuković; Ida Šimunčić; Veronika Drljačić	3:39.83	Romania; Rebeca Daria Ciocan; Lenuta Simiuc; Sanda Belgyan; Mirela Lavric	3:40.40
High jump	Daniela Stanciu (ROU)	1.93	Mirela Demireva (BUL)	1.93	Lia Apostolovski (SLO)	1.90
Pole vault	Nikoleta Kyriakopoulou (GRE)	4.50	Eleni-Klaoudia Polak (GRE)	4.50	Buse Arıkazan (TUR)	4.30
Long jump	Ivana Vuleta (SRB)	6.83w	Florentina Costina Iusco (ROU)	6.55	Filippa Fotopoulou (CYP)	6.54w
Triple jump	Ivana Vuleta (SRB)	14.24	Tuğba Danışmaz (TUR)	14.07	Elena Andreea Taloș (ROU)	13.84
Shot put	Olha Golodna (UKR)	16.78	Sopo Shatirishvili (GEO)	16.14	Aysel Yılmaz (TUR)	15.76
Discus Throw	Dragana Tomašević (SRB)	58.16	Chrysoula Anagnostopoulou (GRE)	57.99	Androniki Lada (CYP)	53.75
Hammer Throw	Stamatia Skarvelis (GRE)	71.08	Iryna Klymets (UKR)	70.41	Zalina Marghieva (MDA)	68.66
Javelin Throw	Adriana Vilagoš (SRB)	60.51	Hanna Hatsko (UKR)	57.93	Esra Türkmen (TUR)	57.14
Heptathlon	Yuliya Loban (UKR)	5681	Beatrice Puiu (ROU)	5311	Sofia Ifantidou (GRE)	5218
WR world record | AR area record | CR championship record | GR games record | NR national record | OR Olympic record | PB personal best | SB season best | WL world leading (in a given season)

== Medal table ==
* Host nation (Romania)

Rank	Nation	Gold	Silver	Bronze	Total
1	Greece	9	6	9	24
2	Romania*	8	5	6	19
3	Turkey	6	6	10	22
4	Serbia	5	3	2	10
5	Ukraine	4	6	0	10
6	Slovenia	4	1	2	7
7	Austria	2	2	2	6
8	Albania	2	0	0	2
9	Croatia	1	6	1	8
10	Israel	1	3	2	6
11	Bulgaria	1	1	0	2
12	Armenia	1	0	0	1
13	Cyprus	0	1	4	5
14	Georgia	0	1	1	2
14	Moldova	0	1	1	2
16	North Macedonia	0	1	0	1
17	Kosovo	0	0	1	1
17	Montenegro	0	0	1	1
Totals (18 entries)		44	43	42	129
