= 2018 Balkan Athletics Indoor Championships =

- Dates: 17 February
- Host city: Istanbul, Turkey
- Venue: Ataköy Athletics Arena
- Events: 24

The 2018 Balkan Athletics Indoor Championships was the 23rd edition of the annual track and field competition for athletes from the Balkans, organised by Balkan Athletics. It was held on 17 February 2018 at the Ataköy Athletics Arena in Istanbul, Turkey.

Romania topped the medal table, winning 15 medals including 5 gold, ahead of the host nation Turkey, and Bulgaria.

== Men's results ==
=== Track ===
Event	Gold		Silver		Bronze	
60 metres	Emre Zafer Barnes; Turkey	6.62 NR	Efthymios Stergioulis; Greece	6.71	Konstantinos Zikos; Greece	6.72
400 metres	Robert Parge; Romania	47.28	Yavuz Can; Turkey	47.59	Cristian Radu; Romania	48.12
800 metres	Amel Tuka; Bosnia and Herzegovina	1:49.49	Musa Hajdari; Kosovo	1:49.58	Christos Dimitriou; Cyprus	1:50.02
1500 metres	Amine Khadiri; Cyprus	3:53.01	Levent Ateş; Turkey	3:53.26	Yervand Mkrtchyan; Armenia	3:53.28
3000 metres	Elzan Bibić; Serbia	8:08.34	Adrian Garcea; Romania	8:09.32	Ivan Popov; Bulgaria	8:10.50
60 metres hurdles	Batuhan Buğra Eruygun; Turkey	7.91 NR	Cosmin Ilie Dumitrache; Romania	7.95	Radu Daniel Ciobanu; Romania	8.03
4 × 400 metres relay	Romania; Cristian Radu; Alexandru Matei Brânzea; Zeno Moraru; Robert Parge	3:12.46	Turkey; Fahri Arsoy; Enis Ünsal; İlyas Çanakçı; Abdullah Tütünci	3:13.44	Bosnia and Herzegovina; Damir Redžepagić; Faris Ibrahimpašić; Stefan Ćuković; Abedin Mujezinović	3:21.24

=== Field ===
Event	Gold		Silver		Bronze	
High jump	Konstadinos Baniotis; Greece	2.22 m	Vasilios Konstantinou; Cyprus Tihomir Ivanov; Bulgaria	2.18 m	Not awarded	
Pole vault	Ivan Horvat; Croatia	5.55 m	Nikandros Stylianou; Cyprus	5.25 m	Andrei Răzvan Deliu; Romania	5.10 m
Long jump	Izmir Smajlaj; Albania	7.80 m	Ivan Vujević; Croatia	7.60 m	Sanjin Šimić; Croatia	7.58 m
Triple jump	Levon Aghasyan; Armenia	16.35 m	Momchil Karailiev; Bulgaria	16.27 m	Rumen Dimitrov; Bulgaria	16.21 m
Shot put	Mesud Pezer; Bosnia and Herzegovina	20.77 m	Andrei Gag; Romania	20.41 m	Nikólaos Skarvélis; Greece	20.15 m

== Women's results ==
=== Track ===
Event	Gold		Silver		Bronze	
60 metres	Mizgin Ay; Turkey	7.38	Inna Eftimova; Bulgaria	7.40	Diana Vaisman; Israel	7.49
400 metres	Maria Belimpasaki; Greece	53.27	Tamara Salaški; Serbia	54.72	Kristina Dudek; Croatia	55.03
800 metres	Florina Pierdevară; Romania	2:05.83	Konstantina Giannopoulou; Greece	2:06.04	Asli Arik; Turkey	2:07.55
1500 metres	Amela Terzić; Serbia	4:17.64	Özlem Kaya; Turkey	4:22.48	Natalia Evangelidou; Cyprus	4:25.80
3000 metres	Luiza Gega; Albania	9:00.67	Valeriya Zhandarova; Georgia	9:16.48	Dilyana Minkina; Bulgaria	9:24.46
60 metres hurdles	Anamaria Nesteriuc; Romania	8.17	Ivana Lončarek; Croatia	8.17	Elisavet Pesiridou; Greece	8.21
4 × 400 metres relay	Romania; Marina Andreea Baboi; Florina Pierdevară; Sanda Belgyan; Camelia Florina Gal	3:47.89	Turkey; Meryem Kemeç; Yaren Açar; Seray Şentürk; Berfe Bancak	3:51.98	Bulgaria; Silviya Georgieva; Polina Todorova; Elena Miteva; Radostina Stoyanova	3:58.89

=== Field ===
Event	Gold		Silver		Bronze	
High jump	Ana Šimić; Croatia	1.92 m	Marija Vuković; Montenegro	1.89 m	Daniela Stanciu; Romania	1.86 m
Pole vault	Nikoleta Kyriakopoulou; Greece	4.50 m	Eléni-Klaoúdia Pólak; Greece	4.30 m	Buse Arıkazan; Turkey	4.10 m
Long jump	Milena Mitkova; Bulgaria	6.45 m	Angela Moroșanu; Romania	6.41 m	Milica Gardašević; Serbia	6.30 m
Triple jump	Gabriela Petrova; Bulgaria	13.90 m	Elena Panțuroiu; Romania	13.63 m	Paola Borović; Croatia	13.43 m
Shot put	Radoslava Mavrodieva; Bulgaria	17.85 m	Dimitriana Surdu; Moldova	17.56 m	Lenuta Burueana; Romania	15.85 m

== Medal table ==
The host country is highlighted in blue

Rank	Nation	Gold	Silver	Bronze	Total
1	Romania (ROU)	5	5	5	15
2	Turkey (TUR)*	3	5	2	10
3	Bulgaria (BUL)	3	3	4	10
4	Greece (GRE)	3	3	3	9
5	Croatia (CRO)	2	2	3	7
6	Serbia (SRB)	2	1	1	4
7	Bosnia and Herzegovina (BIH)	2	0	1	3
8	Albania (ALB)	2	0	0	2
9	Cyprus (CYP)	1	2	2	5
10	Armenia (ARM)	1	0	1	2
11	Georgia (GEO)	0	1	0	1
11	Kosovo (KOS)	0	1	0	1
11	Moldova (MDA)	0	1	0	1
11	Montenegro (MNE)	0	1	0	1
15	Israel (ISR)	0	0	1	1
Totals (15 entries)		24	25	23	72
