= Nikolina Stepan =

Croatian long-distance runner

Personal information
- Nationality: Croatian
- Born: 10 December 1988 (age 37)

Sport
- Sport: Long-distance running
- Event: Marathon

Nikolina Stepan (born 10 December 1988) is a Croatian long-distance runner. She competed in the women's marathon at the 2017 World Championships in Athletics.
