= Croatian Athletics Championships =

Track and field competition

- Sport: Track and field
- Founded: 1992
- Country: Croatia

The Croatian Athletics Championships is an annual outdoor track and field competition organised by the Croatian Athletics Federation, which served as the national championship for the sport in Croatia.

The event was first held in 1992 following the country's independence from SFR Yugoslavia. Prior to 1992 Croatian athletes participated in the Yugoslavian Athletics Championships.

== Events ==
The competition programme features a total of 51 individual Yugoslavian Championship athletics events, 26 for men and 25 for women.

Track running

- 100 metres, 200 metres, 400 metres, 800 metres, 1500 metres, 3000 metres, 5000 metres, 10,000 metres

Road running

- Half marathon, Marathon

Obstacle events

- 100 metres hurdles (women only), 110 metres hurdles (men only), 400 metres hurdles, 3000 metres steeplechase (men only)

Jumping events

- Pole vault, high jump, long jump, triple jump

Throwing events

- Shot put, discus throw, javelin throw, hammer throw

Combined events

- Decathlon (men only), Heptathlon (women only)

== Championships records ==
=== Men ===
Event	Record	Athlete/Team	Date	Place	Ref.
Shot put	21.94 m NR	Filip Mihaljević	5 June 2021	Karlovac	

=== Women ===
Event	Record	Athlete/Team	Date	Place	Ref.
3000 m	9:07.60 NR	Bojana Bjeljac	8 July 2023	Karlovac	
Pole vault	4.26 m NR	Elija Valentić	5 June 2021	Karlovac	
