= Filip Pravdica =

Croatian long jumper (born 1995)

Personal information
- Nationality: Croatia
- Born: 28 July 1995 (age 31)
- Home town: Rijeka

Sport
- Sport: Athletics
- Events: Long jump 100 metres
- Club: Mladost Zagreb
- Coached by: Dejan Vojnović

Achievements and titles
- National finals: 2014 Croatian Indoor U20s; • Long jump, 1st (gold); 2014 Croatian Indoors; • Long jump, 4th; 2014 Croatian U20s; • Long jump, 1st (gold); 2014 Croatian U23s; • Long jump, 2nd (silver); 2016 Croatian Indoor U23s; • Long jump, 1st (gold); 2016 Croatian Indoors; • Long jump, 1st (gold); 2016 Slovenian Champs; • Long jump, 1st (gold); 2016 Croatian Champs; • Long jump, 4th; 2017 Slovenian Indoors; • Long jump, 6th; 2017 Slovenian Champs; • Long jump, 1st (gold); 2018 Croatian Indoors; • Long jump, 3rd (bronze); 2018 Slovenian Champs; • Long jump, 1st (gold); 2018 Croatian Champs; • Long jump, 1st (gold); 2020 Croatian Champs; • Long jump, 2nd (silver); 2021 Croatian Indoors; • Long jump, 1st (gold); 2021 Croatian Champs; • Long jump, 2nd (silver); 2022 Croatian Indoors; • Long jump, 2nd (silver); 2022 Croatian Champs; • Long jump, 1st (gold); 2023 Croatian Indoors; • Long jump, 1st (gold); 2023 Croatian Champs; • Decathlon, 3rd (bronze); 2024 Croatian Indoors; • Long jump, 2nd (silver)
- Personal bests: LJ: 8.09m (-0.4) (2023) 100m: 11.10 (±0.0) (2018)
Medal record
Men's athletics
Representing Croatia
Mediterranean Games
| Silver medal – second place | 2026 Taranto | Long jump |
Balkan Championships
| Bronze medal – third place | 2022 Craiova | Long jump |
- Updated on 15 January 2024

Filip Pravdica (born 28 July 1995) is a Croatian long jumper. He is a five-time Croatian Athletics Championships winner in the long jump including indoor titles, and he is a three-time Athletic Federation of Slovenia outdoor championships winner. He won the long jump bronze medal at the 2022 Balkan Athletics Championships, breaking the 8 metres barrier for the first time with a mark of 8.00.

== Career ==
Pravdica had begun long jumping as early as 2010, but his first national U20 title came in 2014, with his 7.58 m season's best qualifying him for the 2014 World U20 Championships. At the championships, Pravdica jumped 7.02 m in qualification and did not advance to the finals, placing 23rd overall in cold and rainy conditions. Pravdica received hip surgery on his right hip in 2015, causing him to lose nearly a year and a half of training.

In 2016, Pravdica placed 6th at the Balkan Athletics Indoor Championships after winning his first Croatian Athletics Championships title indoors. Outdoors, he placed 11th at the 2016 Mediterranean Athletics U23 Championships and 6th again at the 2016 Balkan Athletics Championships.

Pravdica qualified for his first continental championship finals at the 2017 European Athletics U23 Championships, by virtue of ranking 8th in the long jump qualification in a new personal best of 7.61 m. However, he fouled all of his first three jumps in the finals, thus not receiving the extra three jumps for the top 8 and tying for 11th place by default.

In 2018, Pravdica further improved his personal best to 7.91 metres in winning the Croatian Athletics Championships. The mark was originally displayed as 7.97 metres on the scoreboard due to a technical error, but the meeting officials corrected it to 7.91 m. Nonetheless, it moved him into the top 10 Croatian jumpers of all time, it was a championship record, and it qualified him for the 2018 European Athletics Championships. At the European Championships, Pravdica was not able to replicate his success and placed 23rd overall in qualifying. Following this result, Pravdica underwent another hip surgery, though with better preparation he only lost about one year of training, less than from his first surgery in 2015.

After improved his best Balkan placing to 5th at the 2021 Balkan Athletics Championships, Pravdica won his first international medal at the 2022 Balkan Championships. With a bronze medal-winning mark of 8.00 m, the performance was his first over the 8 metres barrier, making him the fifth best Croatian jumper ever.

Pravdica competed at his first European indoor championships in 2023, Pravdica made his final personal best improvement in 2023, finishing 15th in the qualification. Outdoors, he improved his personal best with an 8.09 m leap at the Croatian Teams Championships for Clubs. This qualified him for the 2023 World Athletics Championships, where he finished 23rd again in qualification. After the world championships, Pravdica equalled his personal best to win the Memorial Borisa Hanžekovića.

== Personal life ==
Pravdica is originally from Rijeka, but he moved to Zagreb to further his athletics training. He was coached by Dejan Vojnović early in his career.

Pravdica works at his Mladost sports club as an athletic trainer and for the NK Lokomotiva football club as a youth fitness trainer. In the latter position, he has trained players such as Matija Frigan individually. At times he worked as much as from 8 am to 10 pm, while simultaneously training as a professional athlete himself.

He has had consistent hip issues, receiving surgery two times in 2015 and 2018. To compensate for these issues, Pravdica generally does not compete in two meetings less than ten days apart. He performs better in hot conditions, as when the weather is cold he feels like he is "80 years old".

== Statistics ==
=== Best performances ===
| Event | Mark | Pl. | Competition | Venue | Date | Ref |
|---|---|---|---|---|---|---|
| Long jump | 8.09 m (-0.4 m/s) | 1st place, gold medalist(s) | Croatian Teams Championships for Clubs | Zagreb, Croatia | 10 June 2023 | |
| Long jump | 8.09 m (-0.1 m/s) | 1st place, gold medalist(s) | Memorial Borisa Hanžekovića | Zagreb, Croatia | 8 September 2023 | |
| 100 metres | 11.10 (±0.0 m/s) | 4th | Città di Palmanova | Palmanova, Italy | 1 May 2018 | |
