= Ivana Renić =

Croatian racewalker

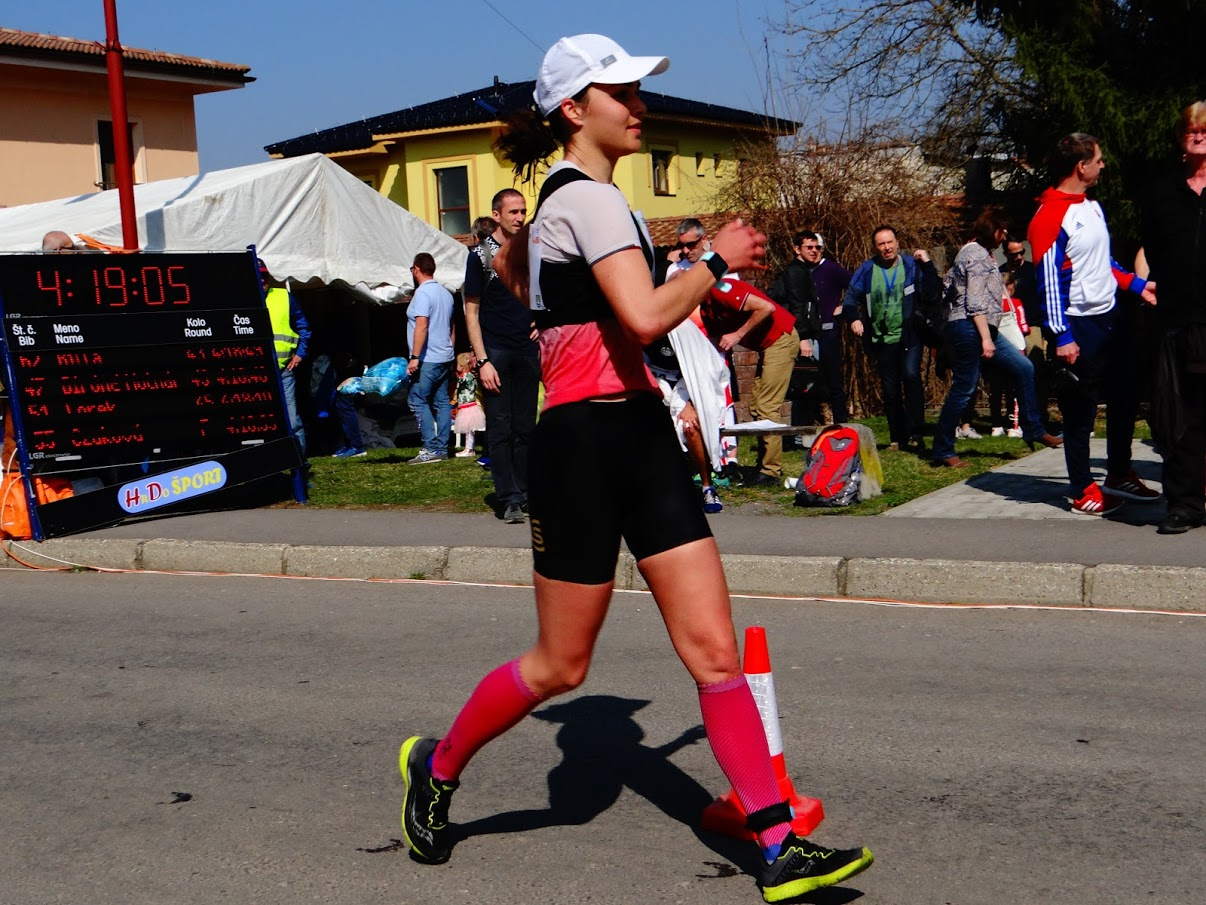

Personal information
- Born: 21 August 1996 (age 30)

Sport
- Country: Croatia
- Sport: Racewalking

Ivana Renić (born 21 August 1996) is a Croatian racewalker. She competed in the women's 50 kilometres walk at the 2019 World Athletics Championships held in Doha, Qatar. She did not finish her race.

In 2018, she finished in 12th place in the women's 50 kilometres walk at the European Athletics Championships held in Berlin, Germany.
