= Bojana Bjeljac =

Croatian long-distance runner

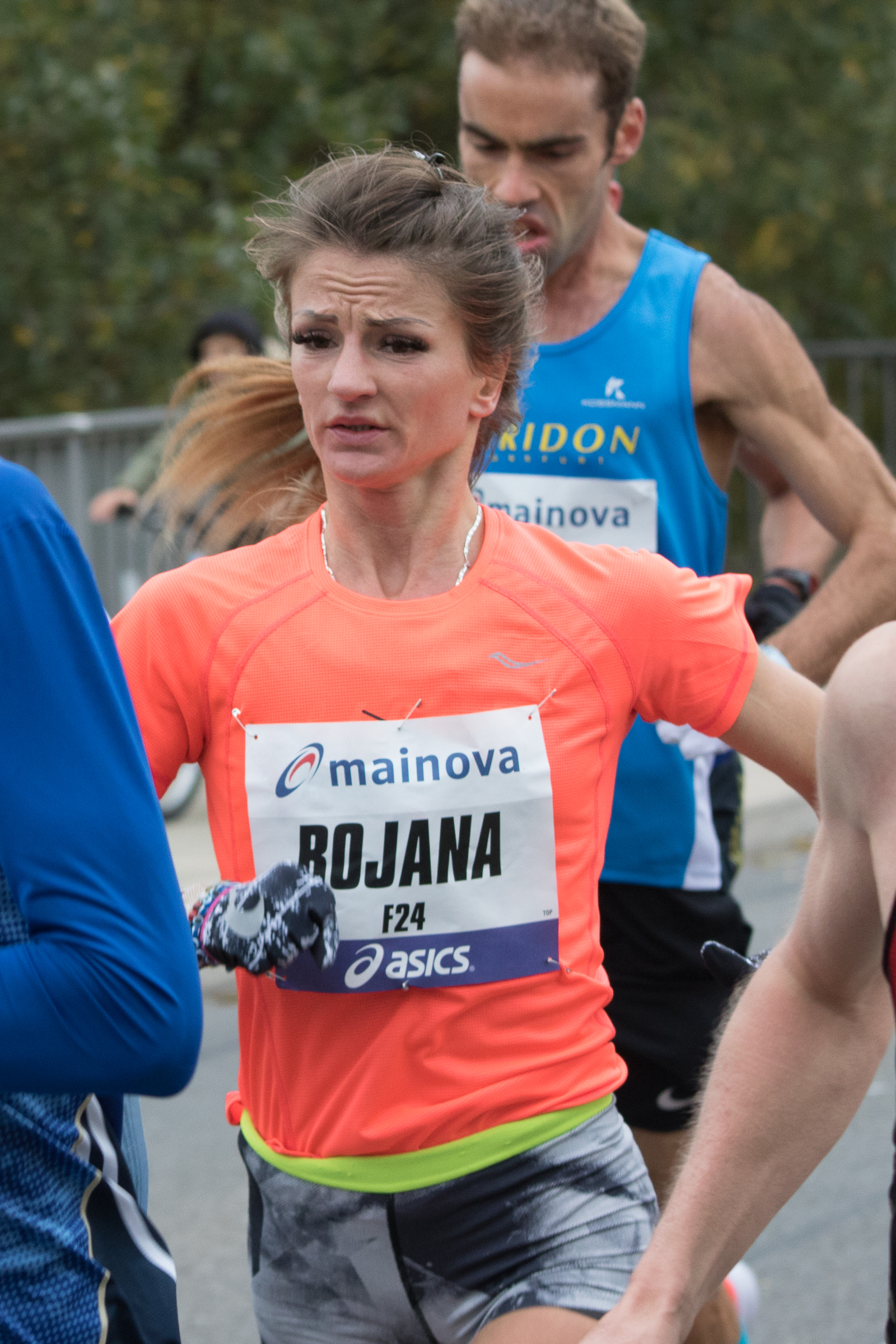
- Bjeljac in 2018

Personal information
- Nationality: Croatian
- Born: 10 April 1989 (age 37) Bosanski Novi, Bosnia and Herzegovina, Yugoslavia
- Height: 167
- Weight: 53

Sport
- Sport: Long-distance running
- Events: 3000m, 5000m, 10000m, half marathon, marathon
- College team: AK Dinamo

Bojana Bjeljac (born 10 April 1989) is a Croatian long-distance runner. She competed in the women's marathon at the 2017 World Championships in Athletics. In 2017, she won Vienna Half-Marathon and Ferarra Marathon. Those were her first international victories in half-marathon and marathon. In 2019, she competed in the women's marathon at the 2019 World Athletics Championships held in Doha, Qatar. She did not finish her race.

Her marathon personal best is 2:23:39NR, set in the 2022 Valencia Marathon. In 2023, he set several national records in the 3000m (indoor) 8:58:58NR, 5000m (indoor) 15:37:98NR, 10000m 32:28:67NR and his personal best in the half marathon is 1:10:43 made in the 2022.

She was 17 times national champion and 5 times national indoor champion.

Bojana Bjeljac boasts several notable participations in both the World Championships and the European Championships, establishing herself as one of the most consistent European marathon runners in recent years.

Here are the details of her appearances in major international competitions:

- 2 Olimpiadi (Tokyo 2020, Parigi 2024)
- 3 Mondiali (Londra 2017, Doha 2019, Budapest 2023)
- 3 Europei (Berlino 2018, Monaco 2022, Roma 2024)
- Turin 2022 European Cross Country Championships
