= 2017 Hypo-Meeting =

Athletics event

- Venue: Mösle stadium
- Location: Götzis, Austria
- Dates: May 27–May 28
- Website: https://meeting-goetzis.at/en/

Champions
- Men: (Canada) Damian Warner (8591)
- Women: (Belgium) Nafissatou Thiam (7013)

The 43rd edition of the annual Hypo-Meeting took place on May 27 and May 28, 2017 in Götzis, Austria. The track and field competition, featuring a men's decathlon and a women's heptathlon event was part of the 2017 IAAF Combined Events Challenge. Damian Warner (8591 points) and Nafissatou Thiam (7013 points) were the winners of the events overall. Thiam's score was the third best time in history and she became only the fourth woman to ever score over 7000 points.

== Men's Decathlon ==
=== Schedule ===
May 27
1. 100 m
2. Long Jump
3. Shot Put
4. High Jump
5. 400 m

May 28
6. 110 m hurdles
7. Discus Throw
8. Pole Vault
9. Javelin Throw
10. 1,500 m

=== Records ===
World Record	Ashton Eaton (USA)	9045	29 August, 2015	Beijing, China
Event Record	Roman Šebrle (CZE)	9026	27 May, 2001	Götzis, Austria

=== Results ===
The best mark recorded in each event is highlighted in yellow

Rank	Athlete	Decathlon										Points
Rank	Athlete	1	2	3	4	5	6	7	8	9	10	Points
1	Damian Warner (CAN)	10.35	7.85	14.09	2.03	47.49	13.54	44.35	4.70	57.59	4:29.33	8591
2	Eelco Sintnicolaas (NED)	10.57	7.61	14.62	1.91	48.37	14.16	43.52	5.40	62.13	4:03.32	8539
3	Rico Freimuth (GER)	10.53	7.47	15.21	1.94	49.40	13.80	49.45	4.80	57.77	4:42.67	8365
4	Adam Sebastian Helcelet (CZE)	10.87	7.32	14.89	2.00	49.50	14.19	44.35	5.00	68.04	4:43.69	8335
5	Pieter Braun (NED)	10.90	7.71	14.82	2.00	49.09	14.40	42.66	5.00	58.49	4:28.14	8334
6	Mathias Brugger (GER)	10.89	7.25	15.32	1.97	47.29	14.06	45.08	4.80	57.81	4:34.26	8294
7	Oleksiy Kasyanov (UKR)	10.66	7.63	14.64	2.00	48.68	14.03	44.99	4.70	54.11	4:33.43	8281
8	Leonel Suárez (CUB)	11.08	7.25	14.18	2.00	48.80	14.54	44.18	4.50	71.88	4:29.14	8214
9	Fredrik Samuelsson (SWE)	10.81	7.50	14.40	2.03	49.26	14.10	40.03	5.00	56.21	4:39.52	8172
10	Ashley Bryant (GBR)	10.89	7.70	14.20	1.97	49.69	14.69	42.52	4.50	67.54	4:31.86	8163
11	Jiří Sýkora (CZE)	10.88	7.33	14.73	1.97	49.20	14.25	47.38	4.80	61.06	4:57.01	8120
12	Pau Tonnesen (ESP)	11.08	7.53	14.65	2.06	53.62	14.60	42.97	5.40	60.86	4:48.90	8102
13	Dominik Distelberger (AUT)	10.73	7.15	13.36	1.88	48.16	14.32	43.08	4.90	60.11	4:35.68	8046
14	Janek Õiglane (EST)	11.17	7.13	15.02	2.03	50.56	14.72	40.96	4.90	65.17	4:37.76	8037
15	Paweł Wiesiołek (POL)	10.79	7.35	14.19	2.12	50.83	14.52	44.50	4.50	55.58	4:42.16	8002
16	Marek Lukáš (CZE)	10.94	6.99	14.21	1.91	50.05	14.62	39.98	4.80	70.80	4:32.94	7997
17	Pierce Lepage (CAN)	10.49	7.64	13.26	2.09	48.99	14.58	40.42	4.90	50.78	5:17.93	7864
18	Simone Cairoli (ITA)	10.79	7.37	13.04	2.03	49.95	14.72	37.53	4.50	56.36	4:21.14	7875
19	Darko Pešić (MNE)	11.25	7.15	15.47	1.94	51.03	14.65	45.56	4.20	59.56	4:24.73	7846
20	Gaël Quérin (FRA)	11.26	7.32	13.39	1.88	49.09	14.71	39.49	4.60	51.22	4:08.90	7764
21	Akihiko Nakamura (JPN)	10.78	7.44	11.43	1.91	48.48	14.22	35.02	4.70	46.92	4:17.15	7714
22	Maxime Maugein (FRA)	11.10	7.03	13.93	2.00	49.79	14.41	39.96	5.00	45.69	5:00.84	7586
23	John Lane (GBR)	10.76	7.43	12.50	2.00	49.41	14.51	40.99	4.90	48.85	DNF	7162
—	Luiz Alberto de Araújo (BRA)	10.72	NM	15.14	DNS	—	—	—	—	—	—	DNF
—	Jonas Fringeli (SUI)	11.20	6.89	DNS	—	—	—	—	—	—	—	DNF
—	Andri Oberholzer (SUI)	11.14	DNS	—	—	—	—	—	—	—	—	DNF
—	Niels Pittomvils (BEL)	11.06	7.31	14.35	1.97	50.07	14.73	42.37	NM	—	—	DNF
—	Fredriech Pretorius (RSA)	10.96	7.31	12.58	1.85	DNS	—	—	—	—	—	DNF
—	Kristjan Rosenberg (EST)	11.03	7.07	13.65	2.03	49.79	DNF	—	—	—	—	DNF
—	Maicel Uibo (EST)	11.04	7.35	NM	2.15	50.67	14.80	47.17	5.20	DNS	—	DNF

== Women's heptathlon ==
=== Schedule ===
May 27
1. 100 m hurdles
2. High Jump
3. Shot Put
4. 200 m

May 28
5. Long Jump
6. Javelin Throw
7. 800 m

=== Records ===
World Record	Jackie Joyner-Kersee (USA)	7291	September 24, 1988	Seoul, South Korea
Event Record	Sabine Braun (GER)	6985	May 31, 1992	Götzis, Austria

=== Results ===
The best mark recorded in each event is highlighted in yellow

Rank	Athlete	Heptathlon							Points
Rank	Athlete	1	2	3	4	5	6	7	Points
1	Nafissatou Thiam (BEL)	13.34	1.98	14.51	24.40	6.56	59.32	2:15.24	7013
2	Carolin Schäfer (GER)	13.09	1.86	14.76	23.36	6.57	49.80	2:14.73	6836
3	Laura Ikauniece-Admidina (LAT)	13.10	1.77	13.53	23.49	6.64	56.17	2:11.76	6815
4	Katarina Johnson-Thompson (GBR)	13.29	1.95	12.72	22.81	6.53	39.98	2:11.12	6691
5	Claudia Salman (GER)	13.51	1.74	14.00	23.62	6.86	39.67	2:05.54	6580
6	Erica Bougard (USA)	13.57	1.83	12.45	23.28	6.59	40.85	2:08.68	6502
7	Anouk Vetter (NED)	13.32	1.71	15.54	24.21	6.19	55.43	2:20.20	6497
8	Yorgelis Rodríguez (CUB)	13.80	1.86	14.09	24.16	6.06	48.25	2:12.65	6446
9	Xénia Krizsán (HUN)	13.72	1.80	14.29	25.03	6.09	49.81	2:10.04	6390
10	Nadine Visser (NED)	12.78	1.74	12.85	23.46	6.27	42.81	2:15.24	6355
11	Antoinette Nana Djimou Ida (FRA)	13.32	1.68	15.16	24.57	6.33	50.19	2:22.64	6311
12	Géraldine Rückstuhl (SUI)	13.96	1.77	13.89	24.80	5.78	58.31	2:16.68	6291
13	Grit Šadeiko (EST)	13.31	1.74	13.89	24.69	6.17	48.35	2:16.86	6280
14	Ivona Dadic (AUT)	13.70	1.74	14.10	24.07	5.86	46.20	2:18.07	6143
15	Hanne Maudens (BEL)	14.14	1.77	12.53	24.33	6.30	40.45	2:11.09	6113
16	Alina Shukh (UKR)	14.78	1.80	13.16	26.77	6.29	52.92	2:12.31	6106
17	Marthe Koala (BUR)	13.72	1.74	13.32	23.81	6.12	39.15	2:19.62	6036
18	Noor Vidts (BEL)	14.11	1.74	13.95	24.21	6.02	36.44	2:10.96	6024
19	Sarah Lagger (AUT)	14.11	1.74	12.65	24.90	6.00	45.06	2:12.33	6012
20	Katerina Cachová (CZE)	13.39	1.65	11.94	24.60	5.82	46.67	2:12.38	5963
21	Mari Klaup (EST)	13.95	1.83	12.06	25.62	5.78	47.07	2:22.60	5872
22	Caroline Agnou (SUI)	14.03	1.74	13.04	24.75	6.01	37.78	2:17.00	5860
23	Karin Strametz (AUT)	13.85	1.68	11.71	25.20	6.11	42.86	2:14.93	5840
24	Bianca Salming (SWE)	14.87	1.80	13.06	26.40	5.73	46.08	2:12.43	5812
25	Katsiaryna Netsviatayeva (BLR)	14.79	1.71	14.36	25.91	5.63	38.38	2:14.46	5634
—	Nadine Broersen (NED)	13.96	DNS	DNS	—	—	—	—	DNF
—	Alysbeth Felix (PUR)	14.15	1.77	11.53	24.53	DNS	—	—	DNF
—	Jennifer Oeser (GER)	14.15	1.68	DNS	—	—	—	—	DNF
