= Athletics at the 2015 Games of the Small States of Europe =

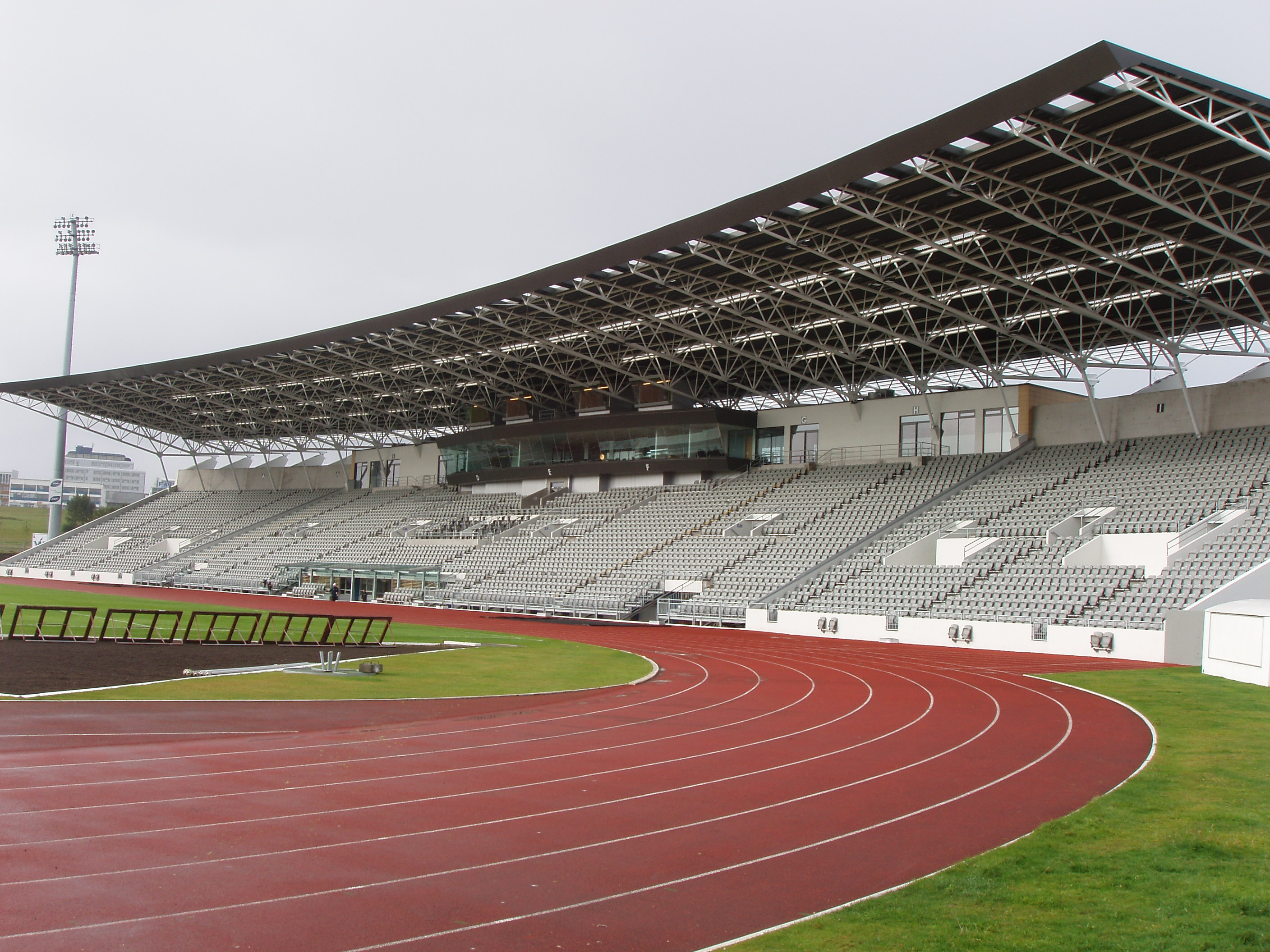
- Host stadium in Reykjavík
- Dates: 2 June – 6 June
- Host city: Reykjavík, Iceland
- Venue: Laugardalsvöllur
- Participation: 9 nations

Athletics at the 2015 Games of the Small States of Europe was held from 2 June to 6 June at the Laugardalsvöllur.

== Medal summary ==
=== Medal table ===
* Host nation (Iceland)

Rank	Nation	Gold	Silver	Bronze	Total
1	Iceland*	15	15	13	43
2	Cyprus	10	11	5	26
3	Luxembourg	5	4	10	19
4	Malta	4	3	1	8
5	Montenegro	3	0	2	5
6	Andorra	1	1	2	4
7	Monaco	0	2	5	7
8	San Marino	0	2	1	3
Totals (8 entries)		38	38	39	115

=== Men ===
Event	Gold		Silver		Bronze	
100 metres	Panagiotis Ioannou (CYP)	10.64	Christos Chatziangelidis (CYP)	10.75	Ari Bragi Kárason (ISL)	10.76
200 metres	Kevin Moore (MLT)	21.54	Paisios Dimitriadis (CYP)	21.75	Luka Rakić (MNE)	21.84
400 metres	Kevin Moore (MLT)	47.86	Kolbeinn Höður Gunnarsson (ISL)	48.44	Georgios Avraam (CYP)	49.84
800 metres	Amine Khadiri (CYP)	1:56.72	Brice Etes (MON)	1:57.67	Kristinn Þór Kristinsson (ISL)	1:58.94
1500 metres	Amine Khadiri (CYP)	3:51.97	Kristinn Þór Kristinsson (ISL)	3:52.91	Hlynur Andrésson (ISL)	3:56.82
5000 metres	Hlynur Andrésson (ISL)	14:45.94	Marcos Sanza (AND)	14:48.34	Pol Mellina (LUX)	15:15.52
10.000 metres	Marcos Sanza (AND)	30:59.42	Kári Steinn Karlsson (ISL)	31:32.17	Arnar Pétursson (ISL)	32:42.38
110 metres hurdles	Milan Trajkovic (CYP)	13.86	Einar Daði Lárusson (ISL)	14.71	Claude Godart (LUX)	14.72
400 metres hurdles	Ívar Kristinn Jasonarson (ISL)	53.21	Andrea Ercolani Volta (SMR)	55.16	Jesse Jacob (MON)	58.91
3000 metres steeplechase	Arnar Pétursson (ISL)	9:22.16	Nikolas Fragkou (CYP)	9:22.68	Josep Sansa (AND)	9:28.58
4×100 metres relay	Cyprus; Kyriakos Antoniou; Michalis Chrysostomou; Christos Chatziangelidis; Panagiotis Ioannou	41.94	Iceland; Juan Ramon Borges Bosque; Ívar Kristinn Jasonarson; Kolbeinn Höður Gunnars; Ari Bragi Kárason	42.01	Luxembourg; Festus Geraldo; Tom Hutmacher; Olivier Boussong; Rick Horsmans	43.89
4×400 metres relay	Iceland; Trausti Stefáns; Ívar Kristinn Jasonarson; Einar Daði Lárus; Kolbeinn Höður Gunnars	3:17.06	Cyprus; Kyriakos Antoniou; Milan Trajkovic; Paisios Dimitriadis; Amine Khadiri	3:17.86	Monaco; Pierre Marie Arnaud; Gabriel Duliere; Remy Charpentier; Brice Etes	3:22.29
High jump	Vasilios Konstantinou (CYP)	2.18 m	Eugenio Rossi (SMR)	2.15 m	Matteo Mosconi (SMR)	2.06 m
Pole vault	Nikandros Stylianou (CYP)	5.15 m	Krister Blar Jónsson (ISL)	5.05 m	Sébastien Hoffelt (LUX)	4.80 m
Long jump	Kristinn Torfason (ISL)	7.24 m	Giorgos Poullos (CYP)	7.16 m	Þorsteinn Ingvarsson (ISL)	7.10 m
Triple jump	Panagiotis Volou (CYP)	15.53 m	Þorsteinn Ingvarsson (ISL)	14.09 m	Jesse Jacob (MON)	13.69 m
Shot put	Bob Bertemes (LUX)	19.11 m	Óðinn Björn Þorsteinsson (ISL)	18.10 m	Stefán Velemir (ISL)	17.53 m
Discus throw	Guðni Valur Guðnason (ISL)	56.40	Andreas Christou (CYP)	53.51 m	Sven Forster (LUX)	49.11 m
Javelin throw	Guðmundur Sverrisson (ISL)	74.38 m	Antoine Wagner (LUX)	70.20 m	Örn Davíðsson (ISL)	68.15 m

=== Women ===
Event	Gold		Silver		Bronze	
100 metres	Charlotte Wingfield (MLT)	11.71	Hafdís Sigurðardóttir (ISL)	11.87	Dimitra Kyriakidou (CYP)	12.04
200 metres	Charlotte Wingfield (MLT)	24.19	Hafdís Sigurðardóttir (ISL)	24.22	Hrafnhild Eir R. Hermoðsdóttir (ISL)	24.35
400 metres	Þórdís Eva Steinsdóttir (ISL)	55.72	Janet Richard (MLT)	55.96	Kalliopi Kountouri (CYP)	56.14
800 metres	Charline Mathias (LUX)	2:08.61	Aníta Hinriksdóttir (ISL)	2:09.10	Natalia Evangelidou (CYP)	2:09.56
1500 metres	Aníta Hinriksdóttir (ISL)	4:26.37	Natalia Evangelidou (CYP)	4:29.08	Martine Nobili (LUX)	4:32.89
5000 metres	Slađana Perunović (MNE)	16:53.78	Marilena Sofokleous (CYP)	17:03.78	Martine Mellina (LUX)	17:20.52
10.000 metres	Slađana Perunović (MNE)	36:58.50	Giselle Camilleri (MLT)	38:11.60	Adriana-Maria Di Guisto (MON)	38:52.43
100 metres hurdles	Kim Reuland (LUX)	14.02	Arna Stefanía Guðmundsdóttir (ISL)	14.09	Angeliki Athanasopoulou (CYP)	14.71
400 metres hurdles	Arna Stefanía Guðmundsdóttir (ISL)	60.77	Kim Reuland (LUX)	61.67	Lise Boryna (MON)	63.18
4×100 metres relay	Iceland; Steinunn Erla Davíðsdóttir; Hafdís Sigurðardóttir; Arna Stefanía Guðmundsdóttir; Hrafnhild Eir R. Hermoðsdóttir	46.62	Cyprus; Dimitra Kyriakidou; Marianna Pisiara; Nikoletta Nkoletiou; Eleftheria Christofi	47.28	Luxembourg; Soraya De Sousa Moreira; Anaïs Bauer; Anouk Zens; Patrizia Van Der Weken	48.73
4×400 metres relay	Iceland; Þórdís Eva Steinsdóttir; Arna Stefanía Guðmundsdóttir; Aníta Hinriksdóttir; Hafdís Sigurðardóttir	3:44.31	Cyprus; Natalia Evangelidou; Christiana Katsari; Kalliopi Kountouri; Irida Theodosiou	3:48.31	Luxembourg; Jenny Gloden; Kim Reuland; Martine Nobili; Charline Mathias	3:50.04
High jump	Marija Vuković (MNE)	1.80 m	Elodie Tshilumba (LUX)	1.77 m	Claudia Guri (AND)	1.68 m
Pole vault	Gina Reuland (LUX)	4.30 m	Hulda Þorsteinsdóttir (ISL)	3.60 m	Bogey Ragnheiður Leósdóttir (ISL)	3.50
Long jump	Hafdís Sigurðardóttir (ISL)	6.50 m	Rebecca Camilleri (MLT)	6.15 m	Ljiljana Matović (MNE)	5.60 m
Triple jump	Hafdís Sigurðardóttir (ISL)	12.49 m	Eleftheria Christofi (CYP)	12.35 m	Rebecca Sare (MLT)	11.94 m
Shot put	Stéphanie Krumlovsky (LUX)	13.68 m	Ann Bertemes (LUX)	13.18 m	Irma Gunnarsdóttir (ISL)	12.21 m
Discus throw	Androniki Lada (CYP)	53.73	Ásdís Hjálmsdóttir (ISL)	42.13 m	Kristín Karlsdóttir (ISL)	36.64
Hammer throw	Cathrine Jayne Cabasag Beatty (CYP)	60.09	Vigdis Jónsdóttir (ISL)	55.40	María Ósk Felixdóttir (ISL)	47.67
Javelin throw	Ásdís Hjálmsdóttir (ISL)	58.85 m	Inga Stasiulionyte (MON)	46.40 m	Maria Run Gunnlaugsdóttir (ISL)	42.30 m

== Men's results ==
=== 100 metres ===
Heats – June 2
Wind:
Heat 1: +4.6 m/s, Heat 2: +6.6 m/s

Rank	Heat	Name	Team	Time	Notes
1	2	Christos Chatziangelidis	Cyprus	10.66	Q
2	2	Yoann Bebon	Luxembourg	10.73	Q
3	2	Luka Rakić	Montenegro	10.75	Q
4	1	Ari Bragi Kárason	Iceland	10.78	Q
5	1	Panagiotis Ioannou	Cyprus	10.86	Q
6	1	Juan Ramón Borges Bosque	Iceland	10.95	Q
7	1	Festus Geraldo	Luxembourg	11.03	q
8	2	Thomas Mironenko Durier	Monaco	11.07	q
9	1	Mikel de Sa	Andorra	11.10	
10	2	Francesco Molinari	San Marino	11.12	
11	1	Anas Adoui	Monaco	11.17	

Final – June 2
Wind:
+2.3 m/s

Rank	Name	Team	Time	Notes
1st place, gold medalist(s)	Panagiotis Ioannou	Cyprus	10.64	
2nd place, silver medalist(s)	Christos Chatziangelidis	Cyprus	10.75	
3rd place, bronze medalist(s)	Ari Bragi Kárason	Iceland	10.76	
4	Yoann Bebon	Luxembourg	10.78	
5	Luka Rakić	Montenegro	10.89	
6	Festus Geraldo	Luxembourg	10.89	
7	Juan Ramón Borges Bosque	Iceland	11.01	
8	Thomas Mironenko Durier	Monaco	11.17	

=== 200 metres ===
Heats – June 6
Wind:
Heat 1: +0.9 m/s, Heat 2: +1.1 m/s

Rank	Heat	Name	Team	Time	Notes
1	1	Kolbeinn Höður Gunnarsson	Iceland	21.62	Q
2	1	Paisios Dimitriadis	Cyprus	21.74	Q
3	2	Kevin Moore	Malta	21.79	Q
4	2	Ívar Kristinn Jasonarson	Iceland	21.91	Q
5	2	Luka Rakić	Montenegro	22.04	Q
6	2	Kyriakos Antoniou	Cyprus	22.09	q
7	2	Festus Geraldo	Luxembourg	22.62	q
8	1	Mikel de Sa	Andorra	22.85	Q
9	2	Francesco Molinari	San Marino	22.92	
10	2	Thomas Mironenko Durier	Monaco	23.18	
11	1	Anas Adoui	Monaco	23.34	
12	1	Olivier Boussong	Luxembourg	23.49	
13	1	Fabian Haldner	Liechtenstein	23.60	

Final – June 6
Wind:
+1.7 m/s

Rank	Name	Team	Time	Notes
1st place, gold medalist(s)	Kevin Moore	Malta	21.54	
2nd place, silver medalist(s)	Paisios Dimitriadis	Cyprus	21.75	
3rd place, bronze medalist(s)	Luka Rakić	Montenegro	21.84	
4	Kolbeinn Höður Gunnarsson	Iceland	21.84	
5	Kyriakos Antoniou	Cyprus	22.09	
6	Ívar Kristinn Jasonarson	Iceland	22.10	
7	Festus Geraldo	Luxembourg	22.65	
8	Mikel de Sa	Andorra	22.87	

=== 400 metres ===
Heats – June 2

Rank	Heat	Name	Team	Time	Notes
1	2	Kolbeinn Höður Gunnarsson	Iceland	50.45	Q
2	1	Kevin Moore	Malta	50.85	Q
3	1	Georgios Avraam	Cyprus	51.92	Q
4	1	Reece Dimech	Malta	52.03	Q
5	2	Rémy Charpentier	Monaco	52.33	Q
6	1	Kormákur Ari Hafliðason	Iceland	52.46	q
7	2	Christian Marx	Luxembourg	53.29	Q
8	1	Pierre Marie Arnaud	Monaco	53.79	q
9	2	Fabian Haldner	Liechtenstein	54.00	

Final – June 4

Rank	Name	Team	Time	Notes
1st place, gold medalist(s)	Kevin Moore	Malta	47.86	
2nd place, silver medalist(s)	Kolbeinn Höður Gunnarsson	Iceland	48.44	
3rd place, bronze medalist(s)	Georgios Avraam	Cyprus	49.84	
4	Reece Dimech	Malta	50.13	
5	Kormákur Ari Hafliðason	Iceland	50.76	
6	Rémy Charpentier	Monaco	51.03	
7	Pierre Marie Arnaud	Monaco	51.54	
8	Christian Marx	Luxembourg	51.66	

=== 800 metres ===
June 2

Rank	Name	Team	Time	Notes
1st place, gold medalist(s)	Amine Khadiri	Cyprus	1:56.72	
2nd place, silver medalist(s)	Brice Etès	Monaco	1:57.67	
3rd place, bronze medalist(s)	Kristinn Þór Kristinsson	Iceland	1:58.94	
4	Christophe Bestgen	Luxembourg	1:59.27	
5	Ben Bertemes	Luxembourg	1:59.40	
6	Gabriel Duliere	Monaco	2:00.89	
7	Bjartmar Örnuson	Iceland	2:01.05	
8	Joseph William Guerra	San Marino	2:01.60	
9	Matthew Crocker	Malta	2:01.65	
10	Neal Brimmer	Malta	2:06.42	

=== 1500 metres ===
June 4

Rank	Name	Team	Time	Notes
1st place, gold medalist(s)	Amine Khadiri	Cyprus	3:51.97	
2nd place, silver medalist(s)	Kristinn Þór Kristinsson	Iceland	3:52.91	
3rd place, bronze medalist(s)	Hlynur Andrésson	Iceland	3:56.82	
4	Brice Etès	Monaco	3:57.41	
5	David Karonei	Luxembourg	3:59.05	
6	Ben Bertemes	Luxembourg	4:00.44	
7	Kaïs Adli	Monaco	4:08.50	
8	Joseph William Guerra	San Marino	4:09.96	

=== 5000 metres ===
June 2

Rank	Name	Team	Time	Notes
1st place, gold medalist(s)	Hlynur Andrésson	Iceland	14:45.94	
2nd place, silver medalist(s)	Marcos Sanza	Andorra	14:48.34	
3rd place, bronze medalist(s)	Pol Mellina	Luxembourg	15:15.52	
4	Nikolas Fragkou	Cyprus	15:33.64	

=== 10,000 metres ===
June 6

Rank	Name	Team	Time	Notes
1st place, gold medalist(s)	Marcos Sanza	Andorra	30:59.42	
2nd place, silver medalist(s)	Kári Steinn Karlsson	Iceland	31:32.17	
3rd place, bronze medalist(s)	Arnar Pétursson	Iceland	32:42.38	
4	Kaïs Adli	Monaco	34:11.38	
5	Jamal Baaziz	Monaco	35:00.46	

=== 110 metres hurdles ===
June 6
Wind: +1.6 m/s

Rank	Name	Team	Time	Notes
1st place, gold medalist(s)	Milan Trajkovic	Cyprus	13.86	
2nd place, silver medalist(s)	Einar Daði Lárusson	Iceland	14.71	
3rd place, bronze medalist(s)	Claude Godart	Luxembourg	14.72	
4	Guðmundur Heiðar Guðmundsson	Iceland	15.24	
5	Jesse Jacob	Monaco	15.94	
6	Moïse Louisy-Louis	Monaco	16.80	

=== 400 metres hurdles ===
June 4

Rank	Name	Team	Time	Notes
1st place, gold medalist(s)	Ívar Kristinn Jasonarson	Iceland	53.21	
2nd place, silver medalist(s)	Andrea Ercolani Volta	San Marino	55.16	NR
3rd place, bronze medalist(s)	Jesse Jacob	Monaco	58.91	
4	Jamal Baaziz	Monaco	1:04.52	
	Guðmundur Heiðar Guðmundsson	Iceland	DNF	

=== 3000 metres steeplechase ===
June 6

Rank	Name	Team	Time	Notes
1st place, gold medalist(s)	Arnar Pétursson	Iceland	9:22.16	
2nd place, silver medalist(s)	Nikolas Fragkou	Cyprus	9:22.68	
3rd place, bronze medalist(s)	Pep Sansa	Andorra	9:28.58	
4	Sæmundur Ólafsson	Iceland	9:49.51	
5	Jamal Baaziz	Monaco	10:14.79	
	Zouhair Ouerdi	Monaco	DNF	

=== 4 x 100 metres relay ===
June 6

Rank	Nation	Competitors	Time	Notes
1st place, gold medalist(s)	Cyprus	Kyriakos Antoniou, Michalis Chrysostomou, Christos Chatziangelidis, Panagiotis Ioannou	41.94	
2nd place, silver medalist(s)	Iceland	Juan Ramon Borges Bosque, Ívar Kristinn Jasonarson, Kolbeinn Höður Gunnarsson, Ari Bragi Kárason	42.01	
3rd place, bronze medalist(s)	Luxembourg	Festus Geraldo, Tom Hutmacher, Olivier Boussong, Rick Horsmans	43.89	
4	San Marino	Francesco Molinari, Federico Gorrieri, Andrea Ercolani Volta, Eugenio Rossi	45.11	

=== 4 x 400 metres relay ===
June 6

Rank	Nation	Competitors	Time	Notes
1st place, gold medalist(s)	Iceland	Trausti Stefánsson, Ívar Kristinn Jasonarson, Einar Daði Lárusson, Kolbeinn Höður Gunnarsson	3:17.06	
2nd place, silver medalist(s)	Cyprus	Kyriakos Antoniou, Milan Trajkovic, Paisios Dimitriadis, Amine Khadiri	3:17.86	
3rd place, bronze medalist(s)	Monaco	Pierre Marie Arnaud, Gabriel Duliere, Remy Charpentier, Brice Etes	3:22.29	
4	Luxembourg	Christian Marx, Christophe Bestgen, Ben Bertemes, Rick Horsmans	3:23.35	
5	San Marino	Francesco Molinari, Andrea Ercolani Volta, Joseph William Guerra, Federico Gorrieri	3:37.60	
	Malta	Kevin Moore, Reece Dimech, Matthew Croker, Neil Brimmer	DQ	R163.3b

=== High jump ===
June 6

Rank	Name	Team	1.80	1.85	1.90	1.95	2.00	2.03	2.06	2.09	2.12	2.15	2.18	2.23	Result	Notes
1st place, gold medalist(s)	Vasilios Konstantinou	Cyprus	–	–	–	–	–	o	–	o	–	o	o	xxx	2.18	
2nd place, silver medalist(s)	Eugenio Rossi	San Marino	–	–	–	–	–	–	o	–	o	xo	xxx		2.15	
3rd place, bronze medalist(s)	Matteo Mosconi	San Marino	–	–	o	o	o	xxo	xxx						2.03	
3rd place, bronze medalist(s)	Kevin Rutare	Luxembourg	–	–	o	o	o	xxo	xxx						2.03	
5	Charel Gaspar	Luxembourg	–	o	o	xxo	xo	xxo	xxx						2.03	
6	Einar Daði Lárusson	Iceland	–	–	o	o	xo	xxx							2.00	
7	Styrmir Dan Steinunnarson	Iceland	o	o	xo	xo	xxx								1.95	

=== Pole vault ===
June 2

Rank	Name	Team	4.40	4.50	4.60	4.70	4.80	4.85	4.90	5.00	5.05	5.10	5.15	5.25	Result	Notes
1st place, gold medalist(s)	Nikandros Stylianou	Cyprus	–	–	–	-	–	-	o	–	-	–	xxo	xxx	5.15	
2nd place, silver medalist(s)	Krister Blær Jónsson	Iceland	–	–	–	o	–	-	xo	–	o	–	xxx		5.05	
3rd place, bronze medalist(s)	Sebastien Hoffelt	Luxembourg	–	–	–	o	o	-	xxx						4.80	
4	Miquel Vilchez	Andorra	xo	–	xxo	o	xxx								4.70	
5	Einar Daði Lárusson	Iceland	-	o	xo	xxx									4.60	

=== Long jump ===
June 4

Rank	Name	Team	#1	#2	#3	#4	#5	#6	Result	Notes
1st place, gold medalist(s)	Kristinn Torfason	Iceland	7.15	7.23	7.15	7.24	6.91	5.93	7.24	
2nd place, silver medalist(s)	Giorgos Poullos	Cyprus	7.06	x	5.57	6.95	7.08	7.16	7.16	
3rd place, bronze medalist(s)	Þorsteinn Ingvarsson	Iceland	6.90	7.10	x	7.05	6.96	6.99	7.10	
4	Panagiotis Ioannou	Cyprus	4.80	7.04	7.02	7.06	7.01	6.98	7.06	
5	Federico Gorrieri	San Marino	6.83	x	x	x	6.57	6.57	6.83	

=== Triple jump ===
June 6

Rank	Name	Team	#1	#2	#3	#4	#5	#6	Result	Notes
1st place, gold medalist(s)	Panagiotis Volou	Cyprus	15.53	15.36	15.38	14.34	15.35	15.52	15.53	
2nd place, silver medalist(s)	Þorsteinn Ingvarsson	Iceland	13.79	14.09	12.05	x	–	–	14.09	
3rd place, bronze medalist(s)	Jesse Jacob	Monaco	x	13.33	13.50	13.69	12.03	13.64	13.69	
4	Federico Gorrieri	San Marino	13.22	13.51	13.52	13.34	13.46	13.52	13.52	
5	Stefán Þór Jósefsson	Iceland	13.20w	13.04	13.12	13.25	11.72	12.72	13.25	

=== Shot put ===
June 6

Rank	Name	Team	#1	#2	#3	#4	#5	#6	Result	Notes
1st place, gold medalist(s)	Bob Bertemes	Luxembourg	x	18.63	18.92	x	x	19.11	19.11	
2nd place, silver medalist(s)	Óðinn Björn Þorsteinsson	Iceland	16.68	17.98	x	x	18.10	17.93	18.10	
3rd place, bronze medalist(s)	Stefán Velemir	Iceland	16.82	17.53	x	x	x	x	17.53	
4	Tomaš Ðurović	Montenegro	16.64	x	15.54	16.04	16.33	16.93	16.93	

=== Discus throw ===
June 6

Rank	Name	Team	#1	#2	#3	#4	#5	#6	Result	Notes
1st place, gold medalist(s)	Guðni Valur Guðnason	Iceland	52.56	53.19	53.58	x	56.40	55.72	56.40	
2nd place, silver medalist(s)	Andreas Xristou	Cyprus	53.51	x	x	x	52.22	52.18	53.51	
3rd place, bronze medalist(s)	Sven Forster	Luxembourg	49.11	x	46.15	x	x	44.69	49.11	
4	Tomaš Ðurović	Montenegro	x	47.54	43.54	47.28	47.76	48.32	48.32	
5	Hilmar Örn Jónsson	Iceland	42.73	43.96	x	x	40.50	41.09	43.96	

=== Javelin throw ===
June 6

Rank	Name	Team	#1	#2	#3	#4	#5	#6	Result	Notes
1st place, gold medalist(s)	Guðmundur Sverrisson	Iceland	68.33	74.38	x	x	x	x	74.38	
2nd place, silver medalist(s)	Antoine Wagner	Luxembourg	x	58.58	65.56	65.05	65.60	70.20	70.20	
3rd place, bronze medalist(s)	Örn Davíðsson	Iceland	65.63	x	68.15	66.40	67.34	67.01	68.15	
4	Moïse Louisy-Louis	Monaco	57.45	56.65	59.96	57.25	58.21	56.23	59.96	
5	Jesse Jacob	Monaco	40.76	–	–	–	–	–	40.76	

== Women's results ==
=== 100 metres ===
June 2
Wind: +2.4 ms

Rank	Name	Team	Time	Notes
1st place, gold medalist(s)	Charlotte Wingfield	Malta	11.71	
2nd place, silver medalist(s)	Hafdís Sigurðardóttir	Iceland	11.87	
3rd place, bronze medalist(s)	Dimitra Kyriakidou	Cyprus	12.04	
4	Marianna Pisiara	Cyprus	12.13	
5	Arna Stefanía Guðmundsdóttir	Iceland	12.14	
6	Patrizia van der Weken	Luxembourg	12.23	
7	Cristina Hurel	Monaco	12.86	
	Kristina Dubak	Montenegro	DNF	

=== 200 metres ===
June 6
Wind: +2.7 ms

Rank	Name	Team	Time	Notes
1st place, gold medalist(s)	Charlotte Wingfield	Malta	24.19	
2nd place, silver medalist(s)	Hafdís Sigurðardóttir	Iceland	24.22	
3rd place, bronze medalist(s)	Hrafnhild Eir Hermóðsdóttir	Iceland	24.35	
4	Marianna Pisiara	Cyprus	25.15	
5	Dimitra Kyriakidou	Cyprus	25.18	
6	Anaïs Bauer	Luxembourg	25.54	
7	Anouk Zens	Luxembourg	26.29	
8	Cristina Hurel	Monaco	26.56	

=== 400 metres ===
Heats – June 2

Rank	Heat	Name	Team	Time	Notes
1	1	Þórdís Eva Steinsdóttir	Iceland	57.65	Q
2	1	Christiana Katsari	Cyprus	57.86	Q
3	1	Francesca Borg	Malta	57.99	Q
4	2	Kalliopi Kountouri	Cyprus	58.94	Q
5	2	Janet Richard	Malta	59.51	Q
6	2	Steinunn Erla Davíðsdóttir	Iceland	1:00.01	Q
7	2	Jenny Gloden	Luxembourg	1:00.89	q
8	1	Tamara Krumlovsky	Luxembourg	1:02.18	q
9	1	Ilona Chiabaut	Monaco	1:04.69	

Final – June 4

Rank	Name	Team	Time	Notes
1st place, gold medalist(s)	Þórdís Eva Steinsdóttir	Iceland	55.72	
2nd place, silver medalist(s)	Janet Richard	Malta	55.96	
3rd place, bronze medalist(s)	Kalliopi Kountouri	Cyprus	56.14	
4	Christiana Katsari	Cyprus	56.61	
5	Steinunn Erla Davíðsdóttir	Iceland	56.67	
6	Francesca Borg	Malta	57.38	
7	Jenny Gloden	Luxembourg	58.79	
8	Tamara Krumlovsky	Luxembourg	1:00.00	

=== 800 metres ===
June 2

Rank	Name	Team	Time	Notes
1st place, gold medalist(s)	Charline Mathias	Luxembourg	2:08.61	
2nd place, silver medalist(s)	Aníta Hinriksdóttir	Iceland	2:09.10	
3rd place, bronze medalist(s)	Natalia Evangelidou	Cyprus	2:09.56	
4	Martine Nobili	Luxembourg	2:14.13	
5	María Birkisdóttir	Iceland	2:25.27	
6	Laia Isus	Andorra	2:33.14	
7	Olivia Bissegger	Liechtenstein	2:38.70	

=== 1500 metres ===
June 4

Rank	Name	Team	Time	Notes
1st place, gold medalist(s)	Aníta Hinriksdóttir	Iceland	4:26.37	
2nd place, silver medalist(s)	Natalia Evangelidou	Cyprus	4:29.08	
3rd place, bronze medalist(s)	Martine Nobili	Luxembourg	4:32.89	
4	Vera Hoffmann	Luxembourg	4:33.50	
5	María Birkisdóttir	Iceland	4:43.74	
6	Laia Isus	Andorra	4:56.71	
7	Simone Michlig	Liechtenstein	4:57.14	
8	Olivia Bissegger	Liechtenstein	5:16.60	

=== 5000 metres ===
June 6

Rank	Name	Team	Time	Notes
1st place, gold medalist(s)	Slađana Perunović	Montenegro	16:53.78	
2nd place, silver medalist(s)	Marilena Sofokleous	Cyprus	17:03.78	
3rd place, bronze medalist(s)	Martine Mellina	Luxembourg	17:20.52	
4	Elpida Christodoulidou	Cyprus	17:35.65	
5	Andrea Kolbeinsdóttir	Iceland	17:54.26	
6	Giselle Camilleri	Malta	18:12.16	
7	Adriana-Maria Di Guisto	Monaco	18:17.18	
8	Anna Berglind Pálmadóttir	Iceland	18:35.56	
9	Simone Michlig	Liechtenstein	18:58.00	

=== 10,000 metres ===
June 2

Rank	Name	Team	Time	Notes
1st place, gold medalist(s)	Slađana Perunović	Montenegro	36:58.5	
2nd place, silver medalist(s)	Giselle Camilleri	Malta	38:11.6	
3rd place, bronze medalist(s)	Adriana-Maria Di Guisto	Monaco	38:52.4	
4	Anna Berglind Pálmadóttir	Iceland	38:58.2	
5	Helga Guðný Elíasdóttir	Iceland	40:59.6	

=== 100 metres hurdles ===
June 4
Wind: +1.4 ms

Rank	Name	Team	Time	Notes
1st place, gold medalist(s)	Kim Reuland	Luxembourg	14.02	
2nd place, silver medalist(s)	Arna Stefanía Guðmundsdóttir	Iceland	14.09	
3rd place, bronze medalist(s)	Angeliki Athanasopoulou	Cyprus	14.71	
4	Malory Malgherini	Monaco	15.24	
5	Fjóla Signý Hannesdóttir	Iceland	15.25	

=== 400 metres hurdles ===
June 4

Rank	Name	Team	Time	Notes
1st place, gold medalist(s)	Arna Stefanía Guðmundsdóttir	Iceland	1:00.77	
2nd place, silver medalist(s)	Kim Reuland	Luxembourg	1:01.67	
3rd place, bronze medalist(s)	Lise Boryna	Monaco	1:03.18	
4	Agnes Erlingsdóttir	Iceland	1:05.01	
5	Irida Theodosiou	Cyprus	1:07.21	

=== 4 x 100 metres relay ===
June 6

Rank	Nation	Competitors	Time	Notes
1st place, gold medalist(s)	Iceland	Steinunn Erla Davíðsdóttir, Hafdís Sigurðardóttir, Arna Stefanía Guðmundsdóttir, Hrafnhild Eir R Hermóðsdóttir	46.62	
2nd place, silver medalist(s)	Cyprus	Dimitra Kyriakidou, Marianna Pisiara, Nikoletta Nkoletiou, Eleftheria Christofi	47.28	
3rd place, bronze medalist(s)	Luxembourg	Soraya De Sousa Moreira, Anaïs Bauer, Anouk Zens, Patrizia Van Der Weken	48.73	
4	Monaco	Ilona Chiabaut, Lise Boryna, Malory Malgherini, Cristina Hurel	53.43	

=== 4 x 400 metres relay ===
June 6

Rank	Nation	Competitors	Time	Notes
1st place, gold medalist(s)	Iceland	Þórdís Eva Steinsdóttir, Arna Stefanía Guðmundsdóttir, Aníta Hinriksdóttir, Hafdís Sigurðardóttir	3:44.31	
2nd place, silver medalist(s)	Cyprus	Natalia Evangelidou, Christiana Katsari, Kalliopi Kountouri, Irida Theodosiou	3:48.31	
3rd place, bronze medalist(s)	Luxembourg	Jenny Gloden, Kim Reuland, Martine Nobili, Charline Mathias	3:50.04	
4	Malta	Ylenia Pace, Francesca Borg, Charlene Attard, Janet Richard	3:52.63	

=== High jump ===
June 4

Rank	Name	Team	1.45	1.50	1.55	1.60	1.65	1.68	1.71	1.74	1.77	1.80	1.80	Result	Notes
1st place, gold medalist(s)	Marija Vuković	Montenegro	–	–	–	–	o	–	o	o	o	xxx	o	1.80	
2nd place, silver medalist(s)	Elodie Tshilumba	Luxembourg	–	–	–	–	–	o	o	o	o	xxx	x	1.77	
3rd place, bronze medalist(s)	Claudia Guri	Andorra	–	–	o	o	o	o	xxx					1.68	
4	Cathy Zimmer	Luxembourg	–	–	o	o	xxo	xxx						1.65	
4	Þóranna Ósk Sigurjónsdóttir	Iceland	–	–	o	o	xxo	xxx						1.65	
6	Selma Líf Þórólfsdóttir	Iceland	–	–	o	xo	xxo	xxx						1.65	
6	Malory Malgherini	Monaco	o	xo	xxx									1.50	

=== Pole vault ===
June 4

Rank	Name	Team	3.00	3.40	3.50	3.60	3.80	4.00	4.10	4.20	4.30	4.35	Result	Notes
1st place, gold medalist(s)	Gina Reuland	Luxembourg	–	–	–	–	o	o	o	o	xxo	xxx	4.30	NR
2nd place, silver medalist(s)	Hulda Þorsteinsdóttir	Iceland	–	–	–	o	xxx						3.60	
3rd place, bronze medalist(s)	Bogey Ragnheiður Leósdóttir	Iceland	–	xo	xo	xxx							3.50	
	Maria Aristotelous	Cyprus	–	xxx									NM	
	Martina Muraccini	San Marino	xxx										NM	

=== Long jump ===
June 4

Rank	Name	Team	#1	#2	#3	#4	#5	#6	Result	Notes
1st place, gold medalist(s)	Hafdís Sigurðardóttir	Iceland	6.35w	6.26w	6.23w	6.50w	6.39w	6.05w	6.50	
2nd place, silver medalist(s)	Rebecca Camilleri	Malta	x	6.09w	6.12w	x	x	6.15w	6.15	
3rd place, bronze medalist(s)	Ljiljana Matović	Montenegro	5.38w	x	5.23w	5.51w	5.60w	5.58w	5.60	
4	Dóróthea Jóhannesdóttir	Iceland	5.56w	5.37w	x	5.35w	x	5.25w	5.56	
5	Claudia Guri	Andorra	5.20w	x	x	5.21w	5.06w	4.80w	5.21	

=== Triple jump ===
June 6

Rank	Name	Team	#1	#2	#3	#4	#5	#6	Result	Notes
1st place, gold medalist(s)	Hafdís Sigurðardóttir	Iceland	x	12.49	x	12.36	x	–	12.49	
2nd place, silver medalist(s)	Eleftheria Christofi	Cyprus	12.20	12.35	12.00	x	x	x	12.35	
3rd place, bronze medalist(s)	Rebecca Sare	Malta	11.71	11.41	11.85	11.89	x	11.94	11.94	
4	Claudia Guri	Andorra	x	11.52	x	x	x	x	11.52	
5	Dorianne Micallef	Malta	11.14	11.37	10.96	11.31	x	11.24	11.37	
6	Ljiljana Matović	Montenegro	10.89	10.76	10.94	11.09	11.12	10.92	11.12	
7	Thelma Lind Kristjánsdóttir	Iceland	x	10.72	x	10.73	10.83	x	10.83	
8	Malory Malgherini	Monaco	10.48	x	x	10.25	x	–	10.48	

=== Shot put ===
June 6

Rank	Name	Team	#1	#2	#3	#4	#5	#6	Result	Notes
1st place, gold medalist(s)	Stéphanie Krumlovsky	Luxembourg	13.57	x	13.32	x	13.19	13.68	13.68	
2nd place, silver medalist(s)	Ann Bertemes	Luxembourg	12.78	12.93	13.07	12.87	13.18	x	13.18	
3rd place, bronze medalist(s)	Irma Gunnarsdóttir	Iceland	10.62	10.61	12.21	10.82	11.15	10.68	12.21	
4	Ásgerður Jana Ágústsdóttir	Iceland	10.91	10.86	11.23	11.30	11.13	10.96	11.30	

=== Discus throw ===
June 4

Rank	Name	Team	#1	#2	#3	#4	#5	#6	Result	Notes
1st place, gold medalist(s)	Androniki Lada	Cyprus	53.67	x	x	x	51.87	53.73	53.73	
2nd place, silver medalist(s)	Ásdís Hjálmsdóttir	Iceland	x	x	x	42.13	x	x	42.13	
3rd place, bronze medalist(s)	Kristín Karlsdóttir	Iceland	34.13	x	36.39	36.04	36.08	36.64	36.64	

=== Hammer throw ===
June 4

Rank	Name	Team	#1	#2	#3	#4	#5	#6	Result	Notes
1st place, gold medalist(s)	Cathrine Jayne Cabasag Beatty	Cyprus	56.97	58.45	57.48	59.93	60.09	59.72	60.09	
2nd place, silver medalist(s)	Vigdís Jónsdóttir	Iceland	55.40	54.21	50.54	52.41	54.43	53.58	55.40	
3rd place, bronze medalist(s)	María Ósk Felixdóttir	Iceland	x	47.18	47.67	46.95	47.06	x	47.67	

=== Javelin throw ===
June 2

Rank	Name	Team	#1	#2	#3	#4	#5	#6	Result	Notes
1st place, gold medalist(s)	Ásdís Hjálmsdóttir	Iceland	52.61	55.55	53.87	58.85	58.31	x	58.85	
2nd place, silver medalist(s)	Inga Stasiulionyte	Monaco	43.82	43.08	46.33	43.64	46.40	42.35	46.40	
3rd place, bronze medalist(s)	María Rún Gunnlaugsdóttir	Iceland	x	x	42.30	40.58	x	39.03	42.30	
