= Athletics at the 2019 Games of the Small States of Europe =

- Dates: 29–31 May 2019
- Host city: Bar, Montenegro
- Venue: Stadion Topolica
- Events: 37
- Participation: 175 athletes from 9 nations

The athletics competition at the 2019 Games of the Small States of Europe was held at the Stadion Topolica in Bar from 29 to 31 May 2019.

== Medal summary ==
=== Men ===
Event	Gold		Silver		Bronze	
100 m	Andreas Chatzitheori; Cyprus	10.76	Stavros Avgoustinou; Cyprus	10.88	Francesco Molinari; San Marino	10.98
200 m	Alex Beechey; Cyprus	21.60	Ívar Kristinn Jasonarson; Iceland	21.90	Stavros Avgoustinou; Cyprus	21.92
400 m	Téo Andant; Monaco	48.01	Konstantinos Christou; Cyprus	48.54	Damien Mizzi; Malta	48.72
800 m	Pol Moya; Andorra	1:51.52	Gabriel Dulière; Monaco	1:52.82	Stavros Spyrou; Cyprus	1:53.88
1500 m	Charles Grethen; Luxembourg	3:48.91	Jordan Gusman; Malta	3:49.94	Pol Moya; Andorra	3:57.96
5000 m	Jordan Gusman; Malta	14:00.40; GR, NR	Hlynur Andrésson; Iceland	14:23.21	Marcos Sanza; Andorra	14:49.54
10000 m	Jordan Gusman; Malta	29:49.43 NR	Marcos Sanza; Andorra	30:52.11	Arnar Pétursson; Iceland	31:01.54
110 m hurdles	François Grailet; Luxembourg	14.52	Ísak Óli Traustason; Iceland	14.85	Darko Pešić; Montenegro	14.86
400 m hurdles	Ívar Kristinn Jasonarson; Iceland	52.31	Andrea Ercolani Volta; San Marino	53.48	Anastasios Vasileiou; Cyprus	54.25
3000 m steeplechase	Hlynur Andrésson; Iceland	8:57.20	Nahuel Carabaña; Andorra	8:59.74	Nikolas Fragkou; Cyprus	9:15.76
4 × 100 m relay	San Marino; Francesco Molinari; Alessandro Gasperoni; Davide Balducci; Francesco Sansovini	42.24	Montenegro; Luka Rakić; Kristian Subotić; Edin Erović; Srđan Marić	42.51	Iceland; Kristinn Torfason; Ívar Kristinn Jasonarson; Kormákur Ari Hafliðason; Ísak Óli Traustason	42.54
4 × 400 m relay	Monaco; Tristan Baldini; Gabriel Dulière; Giovanni Molino; Téo Andant	3:14.45	Cyprus; Crysostomou Michalis; Stavros Spyrou; Andreas Demetriades; Konstantinos Christou	3:16.47	Iceland; Ísak Óli Traustason; Hlynur Andrésson; Kormákur Ari Hafliðason; Ívar Kristinn Jasonarson	3:18.45
High jump	Kyriakos Pampaka; Cyprus	2.12 m	Kyriakos Ioannou; Cyprus	2.09 m	Charel Gaspar; Luxembourg	2.06 m
Pole vault	Nikandros Stylianou; Cyprus	5.40 m	Joé Seil; Luxembourg	4.90 m	Darko Pešić; Montenegro	4.40 m
Long jump	Christos Pantelides; Cyprus	7.38 m	François Grailet; Luxembourg	7.37 m	Ian Paul Grech; Malta	7.15 m
Triple jump	Longinos Achilleos; Cyprus	15.80 m	Ian Paul Grech; Malta	15.00 m	Grigoris Nikolaou; Cyprus	14.58 m
Shot put	Bob Bertemes; Luxembourg	20.57 m GR	Tomaš Đurović; Montenegro	19.40 m	Guðni Valur Guðnason; Iceland	17.83 m
Discus throw	Danijel Furtula; Montenegro	64.15 m GR	Guðni Valur Guðnason; Iceland	57.64 m	Andreas Christou; Cyprus	57.30 m
Javelin throw	Dagbjartur Daði Jónsson; Iceland	77.58 m	Tom Reuter; Luxembourg	72.90 m	Paraskevas Batzavalis; Cyprus	71.38 m

=== Women ===
Event	Gold		Silver		Bronze	
100 m	Guðbjörg Jóna Bjarnadóttir; Iceland	11.79	Tiana Ósk Whitworth; Iceland	11.88	Anaïs Bauer; Luxembourg	11.92
200 m	Guðbjörg Jóna Bjarnadóttir; Iceland	24.26	Tiana Ósk Whitworth; Iceland	24.52	Anaïs Bauer; Luxembourg	24.53
400 m	Þórdís Eva Steinsdóttir; Iceland	56.39	Jessica Ratti; Monaco	56.70	Fanny Arendt; Luxembourg	56.90
800 m	Charline Mathias; Luxembourg	2:07.78	Vera Hoffmann; Luxembourg	2:09.06	Paula Grech; Malta	2:09.85
1500 m	Vera Hoffmann; Luxembourg	4:21.51 GR	Aníta Hinriksdóttir; Iceland	4:22.34	Dayane Huerta; Andorra	4:29.45
5000 m	Lisa Marie Bezzina; Malta	16:55.05	Meropi Panagiotou; Cyprus	16:59.43	Andrea Kolbeinsdóttir; Iceland	17:01.65
10000 m	Lisa Marie Bezzina; Malta	35:39.01	Dagmara Handzlik; Cyprus	35:49.54	Slađana Perunović; Montenegro	36:23.62
100 m hurdles	Angeliki Athanasopoulou; Cyprus	14.02	Lara Marx; Luxembourg	14.62	María Rún Gunnlaugsdóttir; Iceland	14.65
400 m hurdles	Fjóla Signý Hannesdóttir; Iceland	1:02.60	Beatrice Berti; San Marino	1:02.63	Lise Boryna; Monaco	1:03.37
4 × 100 m relay	Cyprus; Marianna Pisiara; Sanda Colomeiteva; Filippa Fotopoulou; Paraskevi Andreou	45.96	Iceland; Birna Kristín Kristjánsdóttir; Þórdís Eva Steinsdóttir; Tiana Ósk Whitworth; Guðbjörg Jóna Bjarnadóttir	45.96	Luxembourg; Soraya De Sousa Moreira; Anaïs Bauer; Lara Marx; Sandrine Rossi	47.51
4 × 400 m relay	Iceland; Guðbjörg Jóna Bjarnadóttir; Fjóla Signý Hannesdóttir; María Rún Gunnlaugsdóttir; Þórdís Eva Steinsdóttir	3:49.42	Luxembourg; Anaïs Bauer; Fanny Arendt; Vera Hoffmann; Charline Mathias	3:51.34	Cyprus; Marianna Pisiara; Alexandra Evangelou; Eleana Christofi; Christiana Katsari	3:54.58
High jump	Marija Vuković; Montenegro	1.86 m	Despoina Charalambous; Cyprus	1.77 m	Styliana Ioannidou; Cyprus	1.74 m
Pole vault	Maria Aristotelous; Cyprus	3.60 m	Silvia Amabilino; Luxembourg	3.60 m	Lara Buekens; Luxembourg	3.60 m
Long jump	Hafdís Sigurðardóttir; Iceland	6.42 m GR	Filippa Fotopoulou; Cyprus	6.23 m	Ljiljana Matović; Montenegro	5.98 m
Triple jump	Ljiljana Matović; Montenegro	12.82 m	Claire Azzopardi; Malta	12.30 m	Irma Gunnarsdóttir; Iceland	12.09 m
Shot put	Kristina Rakočević; Montenegro	15.44 m	Stéphanie Krumlovsky; Luxembourg	13.93 m	Styliana Kyriakidou; Cyprus	13.08 m
Discus throw	Androniki Lada; Cyprus	54.60 m GR	Kristina Rakočević; Montenegro	52.94 m	Kristín Karlsdóttir; Iceland	49.77 m
Javelin throw	Noémie Pleimling; Luxembourg	51.25 m	María Rún Gunnlaugsdóttir; Iceland	46.72 m	Ana Bošković; Montenegro	42.10 m

=== Medal table ===
* Host nation (Montenegro)

Rank	Nation	Gold	Silver	Bronze	Total
1	Cyprus (CYP)	10	8	10	28
2	Iceland (ISL)	9	9	8	26
3	Luxembourg (LUX)	6	8	6	20
4	Montenegro (MNE)*	4	3	5	12
5	Malta (MLT)	4	3	3	10
6	Monaco (MON)	2	2	1	5
7	Andorra (AND)	1	2	3	6
8	San Marino (SMR)	1	2	1	4
Totals (8 entries)		37	37	37	111

== Participating nations ==
- Andorra (8)
- Cyprus (38)
- Iceland (21)
- Liechtenstein (1)
- Luxembourg (34)
- Malta (15)
- Monaco (25)
- Montenegro (24)
- San Marino (9)

== Men's results ==
=== 100 metres ===
Heats – 29 May
Wind:
Heat 1: -1.0 m/s, Heat 2: -1.4 m/s

Rank	Heat	Name	Team	Time	Notes
1	2	Andreas Chatzitheori	Cyprus	10.83	Q
2	2	Francesco Molinari	San Marino	10.95	Q
3	1	Stavros Avgoustinou	Cyprus	10.98	Q
4	1	Pol Bidaine	Luxembourg	10.99	Q
5	1	Francesco Sansovini	San Marino	11.04	q
6	1	Jóhann Björn Sigurbjörnsson	Iceland	11.14	q
7	2	Omar El Aida Chaffey	Malta	11.16	q
8	2	David Mbang Springer	Luxembourg	11.16	q
9	1	Jacob El Aida Chaffey	Malta	11.23	
10	2	Arnau Roig Bosom	Andorra	11.23	
11	2	Luka Rakić	Montenegro	11.24	
12	1	Kristian Subotić	Montenegro	11.33	
13	1	Hugo Marbotte	Monaco	11.49	
14	2	Tony Mazzulla	Monaco	11.59	
15	2	Philipp Frommelt	Liechtenstein	11.61	

Final – 29 May
Wind:
0.0 m/s

Rank	Lane	Name	Team	Time	Notes
1st place, gold medalist(s)	4	Andreas Chatzitheori	Cyprus	10.76	
2nd place, silver medalist(s)	6	Stavros Avgoustinou	Cyprus	10.88	
3rd place, bronze medalist(s)	5	Francesco Molinari	San Marino	10.98	
4	3	Pol Bidaine	Luxembourg	11.04	
5	8	Jóhann Björn Sigurbjörnsson	Iceland	11.05	
6	1	David Mbang Springer	Luxembourg	11.27	
7	7	Francesco Sansovini	San Marino	11.58	
8	2	Omar El Aida Chaffey	Malta	15.12	

=== 200 metres ===
Heats – 30 May
Wind:
Heat 1: 0.0 m/s, Heat 2: +1.2 m/s

Rank	Heat	Name	Team	Time	Notes
1	1	Alexandre Beechey	Cyprus	21.80	Q
2	1	Francesco Molinari	San Marino	21.98	Q
3	2	Ívar Kristinn Jasonarson	Iceland	22.07	Q
4	1	Jóhann Björn Sigurbjörnsson	Iceland	22.22	q
5	2	Stavros Avgoustinou	Cyprus	22.32	Q
6	1	Pol Bidaine	Luxembourg	22.42	q
7	2	Davide Balducci	San Marino	22.53	q
8	2	David Mbang Springer	Luxembourg	22.56	q
9	1	Jacob El Aida Chaffey	Malta	22.74	
9	2	Luka Rakić	Montenegro	22.74	
11	1	Thomas Mironenko	Monaco	22.92	
12	1	Arnau Roig Bosom	Andorra	23.05	
13	2	Philipp Frommelt	Liechtenstein	23.40	
	1	Srđan Marić	Montenegro	DNF	
	2	Thomas Caredda	Monaco	DQ	
	2	Omar El Aida Chaffey	Malta	DNS	

Final – 31 May
Wind:
+1.5 m/s

Rank	Lane	Name	Team	Time	Notes
1st place, gold medalist(s)	4	Alexandre Beechey	Cyprus	21.60	
2nd place, silver medalist(s)	6	Ívar Kristinn Jasonarson	Iceland	21.90	
3rd place, bronze medalist(s)	3	Stavros Avgoustinou	Cyprus	21.92	
4	5	Francesco Molinari	San Marino	22.09	
5	1	David Mbang Springer	Luxembourg	22.31	
6	2	Davide Balducci	San Marino	22.55	
	8	Pol Bidaine	Luxembourg	DQ	
	7	Jóhann Björn Sigurbjörnsson	Iceland	DNS	

=== 400 metres ===
Heats – 29 May

Rank	Heat	Name	Team	Time	Notes
1	2	Damien Mizzi	Malta	48.68	Q
2	2	Konstantinos Christou	Cyprus	48.81	Q
3	1	Téo Andant	Monaco	48.94	Q
4	1	Kormákur Ari Hafliðason	Iceland	49.21	Q
5	2	Philippe Hilger	Luxembourg	49.49	q
6	2	Tristan Baldini	Monaco	49.67	q
7	1	Andreas Demetriades	Cyprus	49.70	q
8	1	Srđan Marić	Montenegro	49.77	q
9	1	Alessandro Gasperoni	San Marino	50.46	
10	2	Edin Erović	Montenegro	50.81	

Final – 30 May

Rank	Lane	Name	Team	Time	Notes
1st place, gold medalist(s)	6	Téo Andant	Monaco	48.01	
2nd place, silver medalist(s)	5	Konstantinos Christou	Cyprus	48.54	
3rd place, bronze medalist(s)	4	Damien Mizzi	Malta	48.72	
4	7	Philippe Hilger	Luxembourg	49.34	
5	8	Tristan Baldini	Monaco	49.35	
6	3	Kormákur Ari Hafliðason	Iceland	49.44	
7	1	Srđan Marić	Montenegro	49.83	
8	2	Andreas Demetriades	Cyprus	49.90	

=== 800 metres ===
29 May

Rank	Name	Team	Time	Notes
1st place, gold medalist(s)	Pol Moya	Andorra	1:51.52	
2nd place, silver medalist(s)	Gabriel Dulière	Monaco	1:52.82	
3rd place, bronze medalist(s)	Stavros Spyrou	Cyprus	1:53.88	
4	Josh Putz	Luxembourg	1:54.46	
5	Luca Bonamino	Luxembourg	1:54.56	
6	Giovanni Molino	Monaco	1:54.85	
7	Aleksandar Miletić	Montenegro	2:01.86	

=== 1500 metres ===
30 May

Rank	Name	Team	Time	Notes
1st place, gold medalist(s)	Charles Grethen	Luxembourg	3:48.91	
2nd place, silver medalist(s)	Jordan Gusman	Malta	3:49.94	
3rd place, bronze medalist(s)	Pol Moya	Andorra	3:57.96	
4	Bob Bertemes	Luxembourg	4:00.28	
5	Carles Gómez	Andorra	4:00.82	
6	Panagiotis Michailidis	Cyprus	4:01.14	
7	Louis Catteau	Monaco	4:03.50	

=== 5000 metres ===
29 May

Rank	Name	Team	Time	Notes
1st place, gold medalist(s)	Jordan Gusman	Malta	14:00.40	GR
2nd place, silver medalist(s)	Hlynur Andrésson	Iceland	14:23.21	
3rd place, bronze medalist(s)	Marcos Sanza	Andorra	14:49.54	
4	Bob Bertemes	Luxembourg	14:59.53	
5	Arnar Pétursson	Iceland	15:05.79	
6	Nicolas Toscan	Monaco	15:09.16	
7	Pol Mellina	Luxembourg	15:25.65	
8	Carles Gómez	Andorra	15:41.07	
9	Miloš Dragović	Montenegro	16:16.66	
	Quentin Chiai	Monaco	DNF	

=== 10,000 metres ===
31 May

Rank	Name	Team	Time	Notes
1st place, gold medalist(s)	Jordan Gusman	Malta	29:49.43	
2nd place, silver medalist(s)	Marcos Sanza	Andorra	30:52.11	
3rd place, bronze medalist(s)	Arnar Pétursson	Iceland	31:01.54	
4	Nahuel Carabaña	Andorra	31:55.95	
5	Omar Bachir	Monaco	32:15.26	
6	Pol Mellina	Luxembourg	32:50.53	
7	Luke Micallef	Malta	32:59.30	
8	Miloš Dragović	Montenegro	34:32.79	
	Quentin Chiai	Monaco	DNF	
	Nikolas Fragkou	Cyprus	DNS	

=== 110 metres hurdles ===
31 May
Wind: +0.2 m/s

Rank	Lane	Name	Team	Time	Notes
1st place, gold medalist(s)	5	François Grailet	Luxembourg	14.52	
2nd place, silver medalist(s)	3	Ísak Óli Traustason	Iceland	14.85	
3rd place, bronze medalist(s)	7	Darko Pešić	Montenegro	14.86	
4	4	Anastasios Vasileiou	Cyprus	15.06	
5	8	Jason Malgherini	Monaco	15.17	
6	6	Konstantinos Tziakouris	Cyprus	15.20	
7	2	Cadogan Abada	Monaco	15.82	

=== 400 metres hurdles ===
30 May

Rank	Lane	Name	Team	Time	Notes
1st place, gold medalist(s)	4	Ívar Kristinn Jasonarson	Iceland	52.31	
2nd place, silver medalist(s)	3	Andrea Ercolani Volta	San Marino	53.48	
3rd place, bronze medalist(s)	5	Anastasios Vasileiou	Cyprus	54.25	
4	6	Elia Genghini	San Marino	55.95	
5	2	José Manuel Gastaud	Monaco	58.28	

=== 3000 metres steeplechase ===
30 May

Rank	Name	Team	Time	Notes
1st place, gold medalist(s)	Hlynur Andrésson	Iceland	8:57.20	
2nd place, silver medalist(s)	Nahuel Carabaña	Andorra	8:59.74	
3rd place, bronze medalist(s)	Nikolas Fragkou	Cyprus	9:15.76	
4	Gregory Giuffra	Monaco	9:46.53	
5	Luke Micallef	Malta	9:52.24	
6	Jamal Baaziz	Monaco	10:04.56	

=== 4 × 100 meters relay ===
31 May

Rank	Nation	Competitors	Time	Notes
1st place, gold medalist(s)	San Marino	Francesco Molinari, Alessandro Gasperoni, Davide Balduci, Francesco Sansovini	42.24	
2nd place, silver medalist(s)	Montenegro	Luka Rakić, Kristian Subotić, Edin Erović, Srđan Marić	42.51	
3rd place, bronze medalist(s)	Iceland	Kristinn Torfason, Ívar Kristinn Jasonarson, Kormákur Ari Hafliðason, Ísak Óli Traustason	42.54	
4	Monaco	Thomas Mironenko, Jason Malgherini, Hugo Marbotta, Tony Mazzulla	42.71	
5	Cyprus	Photis Ioannou, Andreas Chatzitheori, Alexander Beechy, Stavros Avgoustinou	47.10	
	Luxembourg	Lionel Evora Delgado, Pol Bidaine, François Grailet, David Mbang Springer	DNF	
	Malta		DNS	

=== 4 × 400 meters relay ===
31 May

Rank	Nation	Competitors	Time	Notes
1st place, gold medalist(s)	Monaco	Tristan Baldini, Gabriel Duliere, Giovanni Molino, Téo Andant	3:14.45	
2nd place, silver medalist(s)	Cyprus	Michalis Chrysostomou, Stavros Spiroy, Andreas Demetriades, Konstantinos Christou	3:16.47	
3rd place, bronze medalist(s)	Iceland	Ísak Óli Traustason, Hlynur Andrésson, Kormákur Ari Hafliðason, Ívar Kristinn Jasonarson	3:18.45	
4	Luxembourg	Olivier Bouusong, Charles Grethen, Luca Bonanino, Philipe Hilger	3:19.99	
5	San Marino	Francesco Molinari, Alessandro Gasperoni, Elia Genghini, Andrea Ercolani Volta	3:21.25	
6	Montenegro	Edin Erović, Aleksandar Miletić, Boris Vujošević, Srđan Marić	3:24.56	
	Malta		DNS	

=== High jump ===
31 May

Rank	Name	Team	1.85	1.90	1.95	2.00	2.03	2.06	2.09	2.12	2.15	Result	Notes
1st place, gold medalist(s)	Kyriakos Pambaka	Cyprus	xo	o	xo	o	–	o	xxo	o	xxx	2.12	
2nd place, silver medalist(s)	Kyriakos Ioannou	Cyprus	–	–	–	o	–	o	o	–	xxx	2.09	
3rd place, bronze medalist(s)	Charel Gaspar	Luxembourg	–	–	o	o	xo	xo	xxx			2.06	
4	Matteo Mosconi	San Marino	–	o	o	x–	xo	xxo	xxx			2.06	
5	Sven Liefgen	Luxembourg	–	o	o	xo	xxx					2.00	
6	Darko Pešić	Montenegro	o	xxo	xo	xxx						1.95	
	Dragan Pešić	Montenegro	–	–	–	–	–	xxx				NM	

=== Pole vault ===
30 May

Rank	Name	Team	3.80	4.00	4.20	4.40	4.50	4.60	4.70	4.80	4.85	4.90	4.95	5.00	5.10	5.20	5.30	5.40	5.50	Result	Notes
1st place, gold medalist(s)	Nikandros Stylianou	Cyprus	–	–	–	–	–	–	o	o	o	o	x–	o	–	o	x–	o	xxx	5.40	
2nd place, silver medalist(s)	Joe Seil	Luxembourg	–	–	–	xo	o	xo	xxo	o	x–	o	x–	xx						4.90	
3rd place, bronze medalist(s)	Darko Pešić	Montenegro	–	xxo	xxo	o	xxx													4.40	
4	Cadogan Abada	Monaco	–	–	–	xo	–	xxx												4.40	
5	Miloš Popović	Montenegro	xo	o	xxx															4.00	

=== Long jump ===
29 May

Rank	Name	Team	#1	#2	#3	#4	#5	#6	Result	Notes
1st place, gold medalist(s)	Christos Pantelides	Cyprus	7.38	6.86	6.97	x	7.16	–	7.38	
2nd place, silver medalist(s)	François Grailet	Luxembourg	7.24	7.37	7.09	6.97	7.15	6.99	7.37	
3rd place, bronze medalist(s)	Ian Paul Grech	Malta	6.98	7.06	7.15	x	7.07	x	7.15	
4	Darko Pešić	Montenegro	7.15	6.99	7.04	6.88	6.97	6.98	7.15	
5	Ísak Óli Traustason	Iceland	x	6.85	7.01	6.69	6.97	6.98	7.01	
6	Kristinn Torfason	Iceland	6.79	6.64	6.78	x	x	x	6.79	
7	Ognjen Vojvodić	Montenegro	6.69	6.69	6.43	6.13	x	6.61	6.69	
8	Bliss Cibango	Luxembourg	x	x	6.65	6.29	6.65	x	6.65	
9	Elvis Kryukov	Cyprus	6.45	6.58	6.42				6.58	

=== Shot put ===
29 May

Rank	Name	Team	#1	#2	#3	#4	#5	#6	Result	Notes
1st place, gold medalist(s)	Bob Bertemes	Luxembourg	x	x	19.32	x	19.92	20.57	20.57	GR
2nd place, silver medalist(s)	Tomaš Đurović	Montenegro	18.18	x	18.15	19.40	x	x	19.40	
3rd place, bronze medalist(s)	Guðni Valur Guðnason	Iceland	16.75	x	16.83	x	17.51	17.83	17.83	
4	Risto Drobnjak	Montenegro	15.72	14.62	15.56	x	16.01	x	16.01	
5	Elvis Kryukov	Cyprus	14.11	13.82	x	NM	NM	NM	14.11	

=== Discus throw ===
30 May

Rank	Name	Team	#1	#2	#3	#4	#5	#6	Result	Notes
1st place, gold medalist(s)	Danijel Furtula	Montenegro	59.98	59.72	62.02	63.75	62.06	64.15	64.15	GR
2nd place, silver medalist(s)	Guðni Valur Guðnason	Iceland	53.26	57.64	57.58	x	56.53	x	57.64	
3rd place, bronze medalist(s)	Andreas Christou	Cyprus	57.30	57.09	x	x	56.80	x	57.30	
4	Ivan Kukuličić	Montenegro	x	50.51	54.55	52.09	54.31	50.98	54.55	
5	Giorgos Koniarakis	Cyprus	x	x	53.55	x	x	51.17	53.55	

=== Javelin throw ===
31 May

Rank	Name	Team	#1	#2	#3	#4	#5	#6	Result	Notes
1st place, gold medalist(s)	Dagbjartur Daði Jónsson	Iceland	74.60	77.58	74.92	75.95	75.49	74.44	77.58	
2nd place, silver medalist(s)	Tom Reuter	Luxembourg	71.25	72.90	72.79	x	70.05	x	72.90	
3rd place, bronze medalist(s)	Paraskevás Batzávalis	Cyprus	x	x	71.38	–	–	–	71.38	
4	Spyros Savva	Cyprus	59.80	x	64.25	61.27	65.37	60.78	65.37	
5	Mykyta Thill	Luxembourg	58.49	62.22	62.41	x	x	56.26	62.41	
6	Amir Papazi	Montenegro	59.24	55.92	59.83	55.17	57.04	57.39	59.83	
7	Dragan Pešić	Montenegro	52.21	56.32	56.40	x	57.37	x	57.37	

== Women's results ==
=== 100 metres ===
29 May
Wind: -1.1 m/s

Rank	Lane	Name	Team	Time	Notes
1st place, gold medalist(s)	4	Guðbjörg Jóna Bjarnadóttir	Iceland	11.79	
2nd place, silver medalist(s)	6	Tiana Ósk Whitworth	Iceland	11.88	
3rd place, bronze medalist(s)	3	Anaïs Bauer	Luxembourg	11.92	
4	7	Paraskevi Andreou	Cyprus	11.99	
5	5	Charlotte Wingfield	Malta	12.00	
6	2	Sanda Colomeiteva	Cyprus	12.20	
7	1	Kristina Dubak	Montenegro	12.63	
8	8	Charlotte Afriat	Monaco	12.99	

=== 200 metres ===
Heats – 30 June
Wind:
Heat 1: -0.2 m/s, Heat 2: +0.4 m/s

Rank	Heat	Name	Team	Time	Notes
1	2	Tiana Ósk Whitworth	Iceland	24.54	Q
2	2	Anaïs Bauer	Luxembourg	24.66	Q
3	1	Guðbjörg Jóna Bjarnadóttir	Iceland	24.67	Q
4	2	Charlotte Wingfield	Malta	24.71	q
5	2	Sanda Colomeiteva	Cyprus	24.76	q
6	1	Maria Antoniou	Cyprus	25.57	Q
7	1	Sandrine Rossi	Luxembourg	25.92	q
8	1	Kristina Dubak	Montenegro	26.07	q
9	2	Sara Ratknić	Montenegro	27.16	

Final – 31 May
Wind:
0.0 m/s

Rank	Lane	Name	Team	Time	Notes
1st place, gold medalist(s)	6	Guðbjörg Jóna Bjarnadóttir	Iceland	24.26	
2nd place, silver medalist(s)	4	Tiana Ósk Whitworth	Iceland	24.52	
3rd place, bronze medalist(s)	5	Anaïs Bauer	Luxembourg	24.53	
4	7	Charlotte Wingfield	Malta	24.66	
5	8	Sanda Colomeiteva	Cyprus	25.13	
6	3	Maria Antoniou	Cyprus	25.71	
7	1	Kristina Dubak	Montenegro	26.11	
8	2	Sandrine Rossi	Luxembourg	26.46	

=== 400 metres ===
30 May

Rank	Lane	Name	Team	Time	Notes
1st place, gold medalist(s)	5	Þórdís Eva Steinsdóttir	Iceland	56.39	
2nd place, silver medalist(s)	4	Jessica Ratti	Monaco	56.70	
3rd place, bronze medalist(s)	6	Fanny Arendt	Luxembourg	56.90	
4	7	Christiana Katsari	Cyprus	57.32	
5	8	Alexandra Evangeliou	Cyprus	1:00.27	
6	3	Beatrice Berti	San Marino	1:00.70	
7	2	Ilona Chiabaut	Monaco	1:03.16	

=== 800 metres ===
29 May

Rank	Name	Team	Time	Notes
1st place, gold medalist(s)	Charline Mathias	Luxembourg	2:07.78	
2nd place, silver medalist(s)	Vera Hoffmann	Luxembourg	2:09.06	
3rd place, bronze medalist(s)	Paula Grech	Malta	2:09.85	
4	Natalia Evangelidou	Cyprus	2:10.30	

=== 1500 metres ===
30 May

Rank	Name	Team	Time	Notes
1st place, gold medalist(s)	Vera Hoffmann	Luxembourg	4:21.51	
2nd place, silver medalist(s)	Aníta Hinriksdóttir	Iceland	4:22.34	
3rd place, bronze medalist(s)	Dayane Huerta	Andorra	4:29.45	
4	Meropi Panagiotou	Cyprus	4:31.45	
5	Paula Grech	Malta	4:31.79	
6	Lena Kieffer	Luxembourg	4:33.32	
7	Mona Lisa Camilleri	Malta	4:37.39	

=== 5000 metres ===
29 May

Rank	Name	Team	Time	Notes
1st place, gold medalist(s)	Lisa Marie Bezzina	Malta	16:55.05	
2nd place, silver medalist(s)	Meropi Panagiotou	Cyprus	16:59.43	
3rd place, bronze medalist(s)	Andrea Kolbeinsdóttir	Iceland	17:01.65	
4	Mona Lisa Camilleri	Malta	17:19.59	
5	Dagmara Handzlik	Cyprus	17:23.26	
6	Dayane Huerta	Andorra	17:25.50	
7	Slađana Perunović	Montenegro	17:31.13	
8	Saskia Daguenet	Luxembourg	17:52.03	
9	Adriana Di Giusto Grigoras	Monaco	18:42.73	

=== 10,000 metres ===
31 May

Rank	Name	Team	Time	Notes
1st place, gold medalist(s)	Lisa Marie Bezzina	Malta	35:39.01	
2nd place, silver medalist(s)	Dagmara Handzlik	Cyprus	35:49.54	
3rd place, bronze medalist(s)	Slađana Perunović	Montenegro	36:23.62	
4	Imane Zouhir	Monaco	37:18.22	
5	Elín Edda Sigurðardóttir	Iceland	37:26.83	
6	Roberta Schembri	Malta	38:11.22	
7	Adriana Di Giusto Grigoras	Monaco	40:13.27	

=== 100 metres hurdles ===
31 May
Wind: +0.7 m/s

Rank	Lane	Name	Team	Time	Notes
1st place, gold medalist(s)	5	Angeliki Athanasopoulou	Cyprus	14.02	
2nd place, silver medalist(s)	4	Lara Marx	Luxembourg	14.62	
3rd place, bronze medalist(s)	6	María Rún Gunnlaugsdóttir	Iceland	14.65	
4	3	Fjóla Signý Hannesdóttir	Iceland	14.82	
5	7	Malory Malgherini	Monaco	16.23	

=== 400 metres hurdles ===
30 May

Rank	Lane	Name	Team	Time	Notes
1st place, gold medalist(s)	6	Fjóla Signý Hannesdóttir	Iceland	1:02.60	
2nd place, silver medalist(s)	5	Beatrice Berti	San Marino	1:02.63	
3rd place, bronze medalist(s)	4	Lise Boryna	Monaco	1:03.37	
4	3	Chloé Schmidt	Luxembourg	1:04.22	
5	2	Marianna Pisiara	Cyprus	1:04.88	
6	7	Eleana Christofi	Cyprus	1:05.51	
7	8	Bruna Luque	Andorra	1:08.76	
8	1	Marie-Charlotte Gastaud	Monaco	1:11.55	

=== 4 × 100 meters relay ===
31 May

Rank	Nation	Competitors	Time	Notes
1st place, gold medalist(s)	Cyprus	Marianna Pisiara, Sanda Colomeiteva, Filippa Fotopoulou, Paraskevi Andreou	45.96	45.954
2nd place, silver medalist(s)	Iceland	Birna Kristín Kristjánsdóttir, Þórdís Eva Steinsdóttir, Tiana Ósk Whitworth, Guðbjörg Jóna Bjarnadóttir	45.96	45.959
3rd place, bronze medalist(s)	Luxembourg	Soraya De Sousa Moreira, Anaïs Bauer, Lara Marx, Sandrine Rossi	47.51	
4	Malta	Claire Azzopardi, Annalise Vassallo, Sarah Busuttil, Charlotte Wingfield	47.92	
	Montenegro		DNS	
	San Marino		DNS	

=== 4 × 400 meters relay ===
31 May

Rank	Nation	Competitors	Time	Notes
1st place, gold medalist(s)	Iceland	Guðbjörg Jóna Bjarnadóttir, Fjóla Signý Hannesdóttir, María Rún Gunnlaugsdóttir, Þórdís Eva Steinsdóttir	3:49.42	
2nd place, silver medalist(s)	Luxembourg	Anaïs Bauer, Fanny Arendt, Vera Hoffmann, Charline Mathias	3:51.34	
3rd place, bronze medalist(s)	Cyprus	Marianna Pisiara, Alexandra Evangelou, Eleana Christofi, Christiana Katsari	3:54.58	
4	Monaco	Marie-Charlote Gastaud, Lise Boryna, Ilona Chiabault, Jessica Ratti	4:02.60	

=== High jump ===
29 May

Rank	Name	Team	1.50	1.55	1.60	1.65	1.68	1.71	1.74	1.77	1.80	1.83	1.86	1.89	Result	Notes
1st place, gold medalist(s)	Marija Vuković	Montenegro	–	–	–	–	–	–	–	–	xxo	xo	xxo	xxx	1.86	
2nd place, silver medalist(s)	Despoina Charalambous	Cyprus	o	o	o	o	o	o	o	o	xxx				1.77	
3rd place, bronze medalist(s)	Styliana Ioannidou	Cyprus	o	o	o	o	o	xo	o	xxx					1.74	
4	María Rún Gunnlaugsdóttir	Iceland	–	–	o	o	o	o	xxo	xxx					1.74	
5	Elodie Tshilumba	Luxembourg	–	–	–	–	–	o	xxx						1.71	
6	Birna Kristín Kristjánsdóttir	Iceland	o	o	o	o	xo	xo	xxx						1.71	
7	Melissa Michelotti	San Marino	–	–	o	xxo	xxx								1.65	
8	Irena Bošković	Montenegro	–	xo	o	xxo	xxx								1.65	
9	Cathy Zimmer	Luxembourg	–	–	o	xxx									1.60	

=== Pole vault ===
29 May

Rank	Name	Team	3.00	3.10	3.20	3.30	3.40	3.50	3.55	3.60	3.65	3.70	Result	Notes
1st place, gold medalist(s)	Maria Aristotelous	Cyprus	–	–	o	–	o	o	–	o	–	xx–	3.60	
2nd place, silver medalist(s)	Slivia Amabilino	Luxembourg	o	o	o	–	o	o	–	xo	–	xxx	3.60	
3rd place, bronze medalist(s)	Lara Buekens	Luxembourg	–	–	–	–	xo	o	–	xxo	–	xxx	3.60	

=== Long jump ===
30 May

Rank	Name	Team	#1	#2	#3	#4	#5	#6	Result	Notes
1st place, gold medalist(s)	Hafdís Sigurðardóttir	Iceland	6.24	x	6.42	x	x	6.32	6.42	
2nd place, silver medalist(s)	Filippa Fotopoulou	Cyprus	6.23	6.09	6.16	6.08	6.09	6.01	6.23	
3rd place, bronze medalist(s)	Ljiljana Matović	Montenegro	x	5.98	5.95	5.81	x	x	5.98	
4	Claire Azzopardi	Malta	x	5.95	5.54	5.54	x	5.56	5.95	
5	Birna Kristín Kristjánsdóttir	Iceland	3.41	5.68	5.56	x	5.61	5.85	5.85	
6	Rebecca Saré	Malta	5.28	5.63	5.41	5.48	5.36	5.29	5.63	
7	Christonymfi Paidiou	Cyprus	5.11	5.56	x	5.35	5.60	5.58	5.60	

=== Triple jump ===
31 May

Rank	Name	Team	#1	#2	#3	#4	#5	#6	Result	Notes
1st place, gold medalist(s)	Ljiljana Matović	Montenegro	12.59	x	x	12.34	12.82	12.33	12.82	
2nd place, silver medalist(s)	Claire Azzopardi	Malta	11.59	11.87	12.25	11.84	12.08	12.30	12.30	
3rd place, bronze medalist(s)	Irma Gunnarsdóttir	Iceland	x	11.78	11.89	11.70	12.09	11.99	12.09	
4	Christonymfi Paidiou	Cyprus	11.61	11.89	x	11.38	x	11.45	11.89	
5	Rebecca Saré	Malta	11.86	x	11.61	11.63	11.50	x	11.86	
6	Raquel Guri	Andorra	11.18	11.10	11.46	11.19	11.26	11.09	11.46	
7	Malory Malgherini	Monaco	x	-	x	x	x	10.48	10.48	
	Hafdís Sigurðardóttir	Iceland							DNS	

=== Shot put ===
30 May

Rank	Name	Team	#1	#2	#3	#4	#5	#6	Result	Notes
1st place, gold medalist(s)	Kristina Rakočević	Montenegro	13.95	x	15.33	15.44	x	x	15.44	
2nd place, silver medalist(s)	Stéphanie Krumlovsky	Luxembourg	12.56	13.37	x	x	x	13.93	13.93	
3rd place, bronze medalist(s)	Styliana Kyriakidou	Cyprus	12.77	12.85	12.77	13.08	12.93	12.93	13.08	

=== Javelin throw ===
29 May

Rank	Name	Team	#1	#2	#3	#4	#5	#6	Result	Notes
1st place, gold medalist(s)	Noémie Pleimling	Luxembourg	51.25	x	48.37	49.58	x	x	51.25	
2nd place, silver medalist(s)	María Rún Gunnlaugsdóttir	Iceland	42.98	43.06	x	x	46.72	x	46.72	
3rd place, bronze medalist(s)	Ana Bošković	Montenegro	42.10	38.82	41.89	41.20	x	–	42.10	
4	Irma Gunnarsdóttir	Iceland	36.91	40.57	x	x	39.03	41.10	41.10	
