= 2016 Championships of the Small States of Europe =

2016 Championships of the Small States of Europes
- Dates: 11 June 2016
- Host city: Marsa, Malta
- Venue: Matthew Micallef St. John Athletics Stadium
- Level: Senior
- Events: 22

The 2016 Championships of the Small States of Europe was the first edition of the biennial competition in outdoor track and field organised by the Athletic Association of Small States of Europe (AASE). The competition was launched to take place in the years between the Games of the Small States of Europe. It was held on 11 June 2016 at the Matthew Micallef St. John Athletics Stadium in Marsa, Malta. A total of 22 events were contested by around 300 athletes from 18 nations.

== Medal summary ==
=== Men ===
Event	Gold		Silver		Bronze	
100 metres (wind: -1.7 m/s)	Ari Bragi Kárason (ISL)	10.66	Paisios Dimitriadis (CYP)	10.86	Kevin Moore (MLT)	10.87
200 metres (wind: -2.4 m/s)	Ari Bragi Kárason (ISL)	21.56	Andrei Daranuta (MDA)	21.79	Kevin Moore (MLT)	21.87
400 metres	Alexandru Babian (MDA)	47.62	Yevgeniy Kasilov (AZE)	47.80	Georgios Avraam (CYP)	47.98
800 metres	Musa Hajdari (KOS)	1:48.43	Christos Dimitriou (CYP)	1:50.01	Ion Siuris (MDA)	1:50.29
3000 metres	Amine Khadiri (CYP)	8:18.92	Yervand Mkrtchyan (ARM)	8:20.22	Nicolai Gorbuşco (MDA)	8:22.29
110 m hurdles	Rahib Məmmədov (AZE)	15.01	Alexandru Cruselnitchii (MDA)	15.14	Only two starters	
1000 m medley relay	Moldova (MDA); Alexandru Cruselnitchii; Alexandru Babian; Andrei Daranuta; Andrei Sturmilov	1:55.50	Cyprus (CYP); Paisios Dimitriadis; Georgios Avraam; Andreas Chatzitheori; Michalis Chrysostomou	1:56.20	Azerbaijan (AZE); Kamran Asgarov; Arif Abbasov; Jevgenij Kasilov; Hakim Ibrahimov	1:56.83
High jump	Vasilios Konstantinou (CYP)	2.16	Matteo Mosconi (SMR)	2.10	Andrei Mîtîcov (MDA)	2.10
Long jump	Bachana Khorava (GEO)	8.02 (-1.0 m/s)	Izmir Smajlaj (ALB)	7.57 (-0.6 m/s)	Kristinn Torfason (ISL)	7.05 (-2.5 m/s)
Shot put	Bob Bertemes (LUX)	19.99	Ivan Emilianov (MDA)	18.81	Óðinn Björn Þorsteinsson (ISL)	18.38
Discus throw	Guðni Valur Guðnason (ISL)	60.05	Andreas Christou (CYP)	57.80	Vladimir Tocari (MDA)	54.89

=== Women ===
Event	Gold		Silver		Bronze	
100 metres (wind: -3.2 m/s)	Alina Cravcenco (MDA)	12.15	Hrafnhild Eir Hermóðsdóttir (ISL)	12.15	Charlotte Wingfield (MLT)	12.20
200 metres (wind: -2.0 m/s)	Hrafnhild Eir Hermóðsdóttir (ISL)	24.56	Alina Cravcenco (MDA)	24.64	Charlotte Wingfield (MLT)	24.93
400 metres	Arna Stefanía Guðmundsdóttir (ISL)	54.02	Anna Berghii (MDA)	54.80	Þórdís Eva Steinsdóttir (ISL)	55.32
800 metres	Aníta Hinriksdóttir (ISL)	2:01.71	Anastasia Komarova (AZE)	2:04.86	Natalia Evangelidou (CYP)	2:07.28
3000 metres	Martine Mellina (LUX)	10:09.56	Meropi Panagiotou (CYP)	10:11.90	Lisa Marie Bezzina (MLT)	10:12.58
100 m hurdles (wind: 0.0 m/s)	Natalia Christofi (CYP)	14.07	Arna Stefanía Guðmundsdóttir (ISL)	14.35	Gorana Cvijetić (BIH)	14.58
1000 m medley relay	Iceland (ISL); Þórdís Eva Steinsdóttir; Arna Stefanía Guðmundsdóttir; Hrafnhild Eir Hermóðsdóttir; Aníta Hinriksdóttir	2:08.44	Moldova (MDA); Natalia Zdesenco; Ludmila Frunze; Alina Cravcenco; Anna Berghii	2:12.92	Cyprus (CYP); Georgia Kontonikola; Kalliopi Kountouri; Marianna Pisiara; Christiana Katsari	2:14.26
High jump	Valentina Liashenko (GEO)	1.90 m	Claudia Guri (AND)	1.75 m	Mladena Petrušić (BIH)	1.75 m
Long jump	Hafdís Sigurðardóttir (ISL)	6.32 (-2.2 m/s)	Tanja Marković (BIH)	5.87 (-0.5 m/s)	Amaliya Sharoyan (ARM)	5.84 (-2.7 m/s)
Discus throw	Natalia Stratulat (MDA)	56.01	Kristina Rakočević (MNE)	54.07	Androniki Lada (CYP)	53.12
Hammer throw	Hanna Skydan (AZE)	71.41	Marina Nichișenco (MDA)	64.64	Cathrine Jayne Beatty (CYP)	57.30

== Medal table ==
* Host nation (Malta)

Rank	Nation	Gold	Silver	Bronze	Total
1	Iceland (ISL)	8	2	3	13
2	Moldova (MDA)	4	7	4	15
3	Cyprus (CYP)	3	5	5	13
4	Azerbaijan (AZE)	2	2	1	5
5	Georgia (GEO)	2	0	0	2
5	Luxembourg (LUX)	2	0	0	2
7	Kosovo (KOS)	1	0	0	1
8	Bosnia and Herzegovina (BIH)	0	1	2	3
9	Armenia (ARM)	0	1	1	2
10	Albania (ALB)	0	1	0	1
10	Andorra (AND)	0	1	0	1
10	Montenegro (MNE)	0	1	0	1
10	San Marino (SMR)	0	1	0	1
14	Malta (MLT)	0	0	5	5
Totals (14 entries)		22	22	21	65
