= Simone Cairoli =

Italian athlete

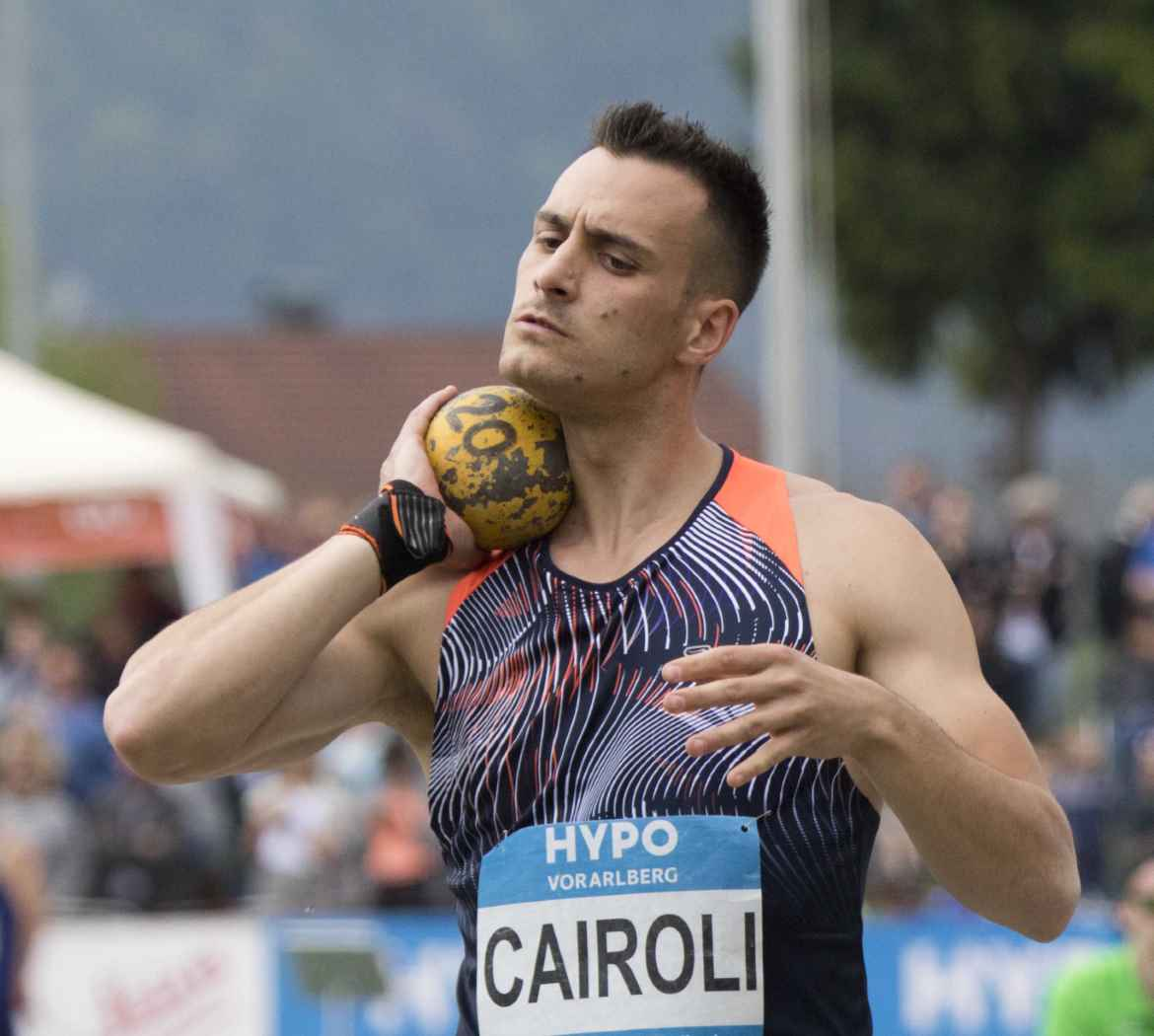
- Cairoli at the 2019 Hypo-Meeting.

Personal information
- Nationality: Italian
- Born: 13 January 1990 (age 36) Gallarate, Italy
- Height: 1.83 kg
- Weight: 77 kg (170 lb)

Sport
- Country: Italy
- Sport: Athletics
- Event: Decathlon
- Club: Atletica Lecco
- Coached by: Andrea Calandrina
- Retired: 2021

Achievements and titles
- Personal bests: Decathlon: 7949 pts (2018); Heptathlon: 5841 pts (2017)

Simone Cairoli (born 7 July 1990) is an Italian male decathlete, who won six national championships. In 2017 with his personal best had reached the 5th place in the national all-time lists and 52nd place in the seasonal world lists.

== Biography ==
Simone Cairoli finished at 12th at the 2017 European Athletics Indoor Championships, establishing his personal best, and was selected for 2018 European Athletics Championships.

Curiously he is a specialist of the decathlon (sport) working as a clerk at Decathlon (shop).

== His first European final ==
After the first day of events at the 2018 European Championships, Cairoli finished 6th with 2110 points.

	Event	Performance	Event points	Event place	Total points	Total place
Day one (7 August)	100 m	10.94 (+0.3)	874	8	874	8
Day one (7 August)	Long jump	7.49 (+1.3) PB	932	8	1806	6
Day one (7 August)	Shot put	13.25 m	682	24	2488	7
Day one (7 August)	High jump	2.05 m SB	850	5	3338	5
Day one (7 August)	400 m	48.77 PB	872	9	4210	6
Day two (8 August)	100 m hs	14.66 SB=	891	11	5101	4
Day two (8 August)	Discus throw	35.30 m	570	22	5671	12
Day two (8 August)	Pole vault	4,60 m PB	790	17	6461	12
Day two (8 August)	Javelin throw	59.62 m PB	732	10	7193	11
Day two (8 August)	1500 m	4:28.38	756	4	7949 PB	10

== Personal best ==
Decathlon

- 7942 pts ( (Germany) Berlin, 7–8 August 2018) at the 2018 European Championships
  - 100 m: 10.94, long jump: 7.49 m, shot put: 13.25 m, high jump: 2.05 m, 400 m: 48.77;
  - 110 m hs: 14.66, discus throw: 35.30 m, pole vault: 4.60 m, javelin throw: 59.62 m, 1500 m: 4:28.30

Previous Decathlon Personal Best

- 7875 pts ( (Austria) Götzis, 2 May 2017) at the 2017 Hypo-Meeting
  - 100 m: 10.79, long jump: 7.37 m, shot put: 13.04 m, high jump: 2.03 m, 400 m: 49.95;
  - 110 m hs: 14.72, discus throw: 37.53 m, pole vault: 4.50 m, javelin throw: 56.36 m, 1500 m: 4:21.14

Heptathlon

- 5841 pts ( (Serbia) Belgrade, 5 March 2017) at the 2017 European Indoor Championships
  - 60 m: 7.04, long jump: 7.55 m PB, shot put: 12.21 m, high jump: 2.04 m,
  - 60 m hs: 8.31 SB, pole vault: 4.60 m PB, 1000 m: 2:40.14

== Achievements ==
Year	Competition	Venue	Position	Event	Performance	Notes
2013	European Cup	(Estonia) Tallinn	19th	Decathlon	7169 pts	PB
2017	European Indoor Championships	(Serbia) Belgrade	12th	Heptathlon	5841 pts	PB
2018	European Championships	(Germany) Berlin	10th	Decathlon	7949 pts	PB

== National titles ==
He won 8 times the national championships.

- Italian Athletics Championships
  - Decathlon: 2015, 2016
- Italian Indoor Athletics Championships
  - Heptathlon: 2014, 2015, 2017, 2018, 2019, 2020

== See also ==
- Italian all-time top lists - Decathlon
- Italy at the 2018 European Athletics Championships
