= Hlynur Andrésson =

Icelandic long-distance runner

Personal information
- Born: 16 September 1993 (age 32)

Sport
- Country: Iceland
- Sport: Athletics
- Events: Middle-distance running; Long-distance running
Medal record
Men's athletics
Representing Iceland
Games of the Small States of Europe
Gold medal – first place	2015 Reykjavík	5000 m
Gold medal – first place	2019 Budva	3000 m s'chase
Silver medal – second place	2019 Budva	5000 m
Bronze medal – third place	2015 Reykjavík	1500 m
Bronze medal – third place	2019 Budva	4 x 400 m relay

Hlynur Andrésson (born 16 September 1993) is an Icelandic long-distance runner. In 2020, he competed in the men's race at the 2020 World Athletics Half Marathon Championships held in Gdynia, Poland.

In 2019, he won the gold medal in the men's 3000 metre steeplechase event at the 2019 Games of the Small States of Europe held Budva, Montenegro. He also won the silver medal in the men's 5000 metre event.
