= Arnar Pétursson =

Icelandic long-distance runner

Personal information
- Born: 12 March 1991 (age 35)

Sport
- Country: Iceland
- Sport: Long-distance running
Medal record
Men's running
Representing Iceland
Games of the Small States of Europe
| Gold medal – first place | 2015 Reykjavík | 3000 m |
| Silver medal – second place | 2015 Reykjavík | 10,000 m |
| Bronze medal – third place | 2019 Budva | 10,000 m |

Arnar Pétursson (born 12 March 1991) is an Icelandic long-distance runner. In 2018, he competed in the men's half marathon at the 2018 IAAF World Half Marathon Championships held in Valencia, Spain. He finished in 116th place.

In 2019, he won the bronze medal in the men's 10,000 metres event at the 2019 Games of the Small States of Europe held in Budva, Montenegro.

With a time of 6:24:53, Arnar is the Icelandic national record holder over 100 km set in Koper, Slovenia, on 28 March 2026.
