= 2017 European Athletics Indoor Championships – Men's heptathlon =

The men's heptathlon event at the 2017 European Athletics Indoor Championships were held on March 4–5, 2017.

== Medalists ==
Gold	Silver	Bronze
Kevin Mayer; France	Jorge Ureña; Spain	Adam Helcelet; Czech Republic

== Records ==
Standing records prior to the 2013 European Athletics Indoor Championships
World record	Ashton Eaton (USA)	6645	Istanbul, Turkey	10 March 2012
European record	Roman Šebrle (CZE)	6438	Budapest, Hungary	7 March 2004
Championship record	Tomáš Dvořák (CZE)	6424	Ghent, Belgium	26 February 2000
World Leading	Jorge Ureña (ESP)	6249	Prague, Czech Republic	29 January 2017
European Leading	Jorge Ureña (ESP)	6249	Prague, Czech Republic	29 January 2017

== Results ==
=== 60 metres ===
Rank	Heat	Lane	Athlete	Nationality	Time	Notes	Points
1	2	5	Jorge Ureña	Spain	6.94		904
2	2	4	Dominik Distelberger	Austria	6.94		904
3	2	2	Kevin Mayer	France	6.95	SB	900
4	1	4	Mihail Dudaš	Serbia	7.03		872
5	2	1	Kristjan Rosenberg	Estonia	7.04		868
6	2	3	Simone Cairoli	Italy	7.04		868
7	1	5	Fredrik Samuelsson	Sweden	7.06	PB	861
7	1	1	Ashley Bryant	Great Britain	7.06	PB	861
9	2	6	Adam Helcelet	Czech Republic	7.06		861
10	2	7	Jiří Sýkora	Czech Republic	7.06		861
11	2	8	Liam Ramsay	Great Britain	7.12		840
12	1	6	Matthias Brugger	Germany	7.13		837
13	1	7	Bastien Auzeil	France	7.19		816
14	1	8	Niels Pittomvils	Belgium	7.22		806
15	1	2	Darko Pešić	Montenegro	7.22	PB	706
16	1	1	Maicel Uibo	Estonia	7.35		762

=== Long jump ===
Rank	Athlete	Nationality	#1	#2	#3	Result	Notes	Points	Total
1	Ashley Bryant	Great Britain	7.60	7.66	7.57	7.66		975	1836
2	Simone Cairoli	Italy	7.15	7.55	x	7.55	PB	947	1815
3	Kevin Mayer	France	7.24	7.54	7.39	7.54	=PB	945	1845
4	Adam Helcelet	Czech Republic	7.22	7.41	7.25	7.41		913	1774
5	Mihail Dudaš	Serbia	x	7.40	x	7.40		910	1782
5	Fredrik Samuelsson	Sweden	7.40	x	x	7.40	SB	910	1771
7	Dominik Distelberger	Austria	7.32	7.27	7.38	7.38		905	1809
8	Jorge Ureña	Spain	7.37	x	x	7.37		903	1807
9	Matthias Brugger	Germany	7.36	7.21	7.24	7.36	PB	900	1737
10	Darko Pešić	Montenegro	7.12	x	7.12	7.12	NR	842	1648
11	Niels Pittomvils	Belgium	x	7.12	7.05	7.12	SB	842	1648
12	Jiří Sýkora	Czech Republic	7.00	6.70	7.10	7.10		838	1699
13	Kristjan Rosenberg	Estonia	6.98	7.06	x	7.06		828	1696
14	Liam Ramsay	Great Britain	x	6.81	x	6.81		769	1609
15	Bastien Auzeil	France	6.76	6.76	x	6.76		757	1573
	Maicel Uibo	Estonia	x	–	–	NM		0	762

=== Shot put ===
Rank	Athlete	Nationality	#1	#2	#3	Result	Notes	Points	Total
1	Darko Pešić	Montenegro	16.08	16.04	x	16.08	PB	856	2504
2	Kevin Mayer	France	15.66	x	x	15.66	SB	830	2675
3	Adam Helcelet	Czech Republic	x	15.25	x	15.25	SB	805	2579
4	Jiří Sýkora	Czech Republic	13.59	15.06	x	15.06	PB	793	2492
5	Ashley Bryant	Great Britain	14.36	x	14.57	14.57		763	2599
6	Matthias Brugger	Germany	13.83	14.07	14.53	14.53		761	2498
7	Mihail Dudaš	Serbia	13.58	14.33	14.08	14.33		749	2531
8	Jorge Ureña	Spain	12.51	13.97	14.24	14.24		743	2550
9	Fredrik Samuelsson	Sweden	13.86	14.24	x	14.24	SB	743	2514
10	Kristjan Rosenberg	Estonia	13.32	14.08	x	14.08	PB	733	2429
11	Bastien Auzeil	France	x	13.72	13.90	13.90		722	2295
12	Niels Pittomvils	Belgium	x	13.61	13.83	13.83	SB	718	2366
13	Liam Ramsay	Great Britain	13.62	12.90	13.37	13.62	SB	705	2314
14	Dominik Distelberger	Austria	13.55	x	x	13.55	SB	701	2510
15	Simone Cairoli	Italy	12.21	x	12.11	12.21		619	2434
	Maicel Uibo	Estonia	–	–	–	DNS		0	DNF

=== High jump ===
Rank	Athlete	Nationality	1.83	1.86	1.89	1.92	1.95	1.98	2.01	2.04	2.07	2.10	2.13	2.16	Result	Notes	Points	Total
1	Kristjan Rosenberg	Estonia	–	–	–	o	o	o	o	o	o	o	xo	xxx	2.13		925	3354
2	Kevin Mayer	France	–	–	–	xo	–	o	xo	o	o	o	r		2.10	SB	896	3571
2	Jorge Ureña	Spain	–	o	–	o	–	o	xo	o	xo	o	xxx		2.10	PB	896	3446
4	Liam Ramsay	Great Britain	–	–	o	–	o	–	xo	o	xxx				2.04		840	3154
5	Simone Cairoli	Italy	–	–	o	–	o	–	o	xxo	xxx				2.04		840	3274
5	Niels Pittomvils	Belgium	–	–	o	o	o	o	o	xxo	xxx				2.04	PB	840	3206
7	Mihail Dudaš	Serbia	–	–	o	–	o	o	o	xxx					2.01	SB	813	3344
7	Fredrik Samuelsson	Sweden	–	–	o	–	o	o	o	xxx					2.01	PB	813	3327
9	Adam Helcelet	Czech Republic	–	–	–	o	o	o	xxo	xxx					2.01		813	3392
9	Darko Pešić	Montenegro	o	–	o	o	o	o	xxo	xxx					2.01	SB	813	3317
11	Jiří Sýkora	Czech Republic	–	xo	o	o	o	o	xxx						1.98		785	3277
12	Ashley Bryant	Great Britain	–	o	–	o	o	xxo	xxr						1.98		785	3384
13	Bastien Auzeil	France	–	–	–	o	o	xxx							1.95	SB	758	3053
14	Matthias Brugger	Germany	–	–	–	o	–	xxx							1.92		731	3229
15	Dominik Distelberger	Austria	xo	–	o	o	xxx								1.92		731	3241

=== 60 metres hurdles ===
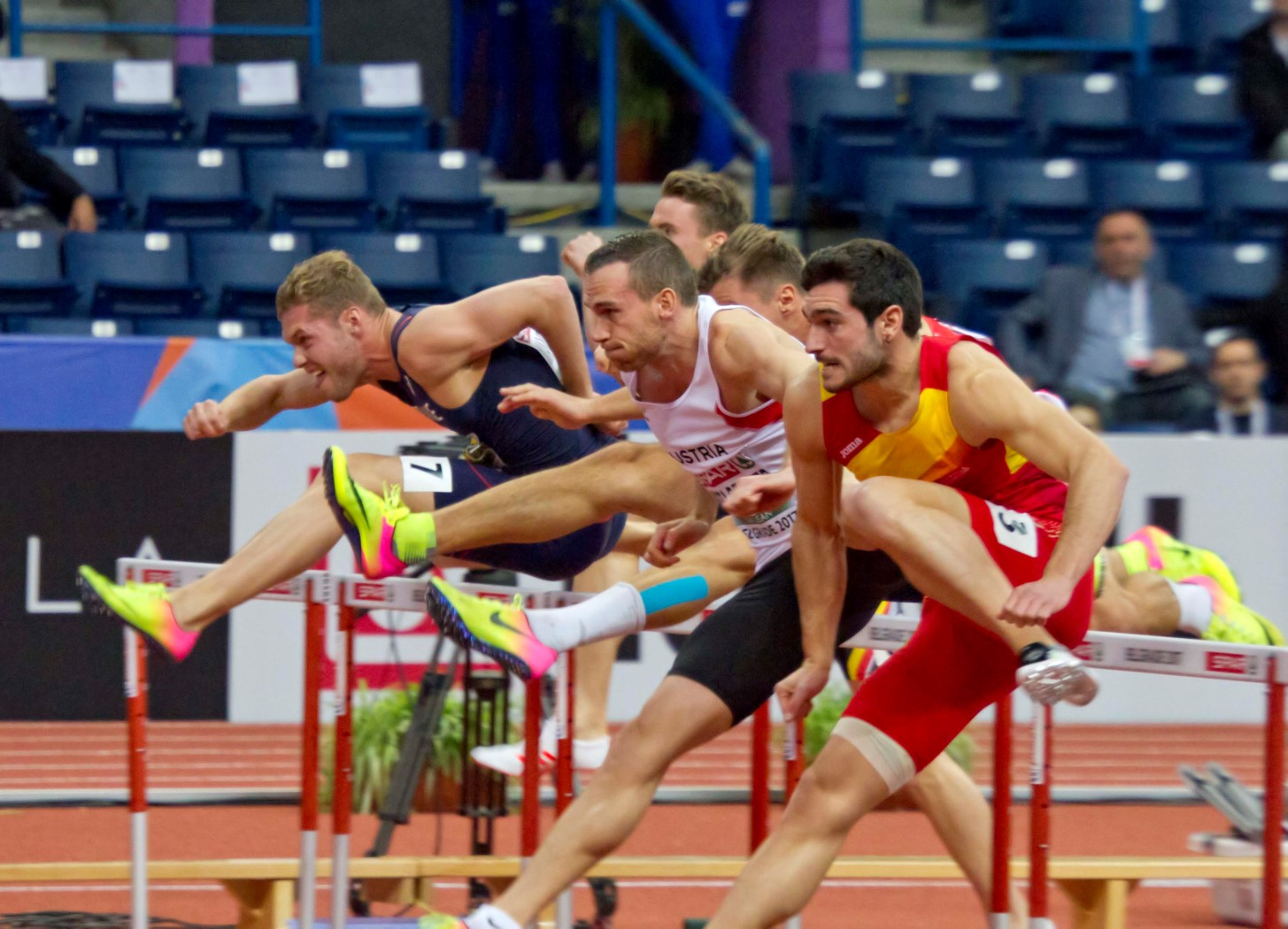
Heat 2

Rank	Heat	Lane	Athlete	Nationality	Result	Notes	Points	Total
1	2	3	Jorge Ureña	Spain	7.78	=CB	1038	4484
2	2	4	Dominik Distelberger	Austria	7.80	PB	1033	4274
3	2	7	Kevin Mayer	France	7.88	PB	1012	4583
4	2	5	Adam Helcelet	Czech Republic	7.97		989	4381
5	1	4	Darko Pešić	Montenegro	7.99	PB	984	4301
5	2	6	Jiří Sýkora	Czech Republic	7.99	PB	984	4261
7	1	7	Liam Ramsay	Great Britain	8.11	SB	954	4108
7	2	1	Mihail Dudaš	Serbia	8.11		954	4298
9	2	2	Ashley Bryant	Great Britain	8.12		952	4336
10	1	5	Fredrik Samuelsson	Sweden	8.18		937	4264
11	1	3	Mathias Brugger	Germany	8.22		927	4156
12	1	6	Bastien Auzeil	France	8.30		908	3961
13	1	2	Simone Cairoli	Italy	8.31		905	4179
13	2	8	Niels Pittomvils	Belgium	8.31		905	4111
15	1	8	Kristjan Rosenberg	Estonia	8.50		860	4214

=== Pole vault ===
Rank	Athlete	Nationality	4.20	4.30	4.40	4.50	4.60	4.70	4.80	4.90	5.00	5.10	5.20	5.30	5.40	5.50	Result	Notes	Points	Total
1	Kevin Mayer	France	–	–	–	–	–	–	–	–	–	–	o	o	o	xxx	5.40	PB	1035	5618
2	Niels Pittomvils	Belgium	–	–	–	–	–	–	–	o	–	o	xxo	xo	xo	xxx	5.40		1035	5146
3	Mihail Dudaš	Serbia	–	–	–	–	o	–	o	o	o	o	xxx				5.10	PB	941	5239
4	Dominik Distelberger	Austria	–	–	–	–	o	–	o	o	xo	xxo	xxx				5.10	PB	941	5215
5	Jorge Ureña	Spain	–	–	o	–	xo	–	xo	o	o	xxx					5.00		910	5394
6	Adam Helcelet	Czech Republic	–	–	–	–	o	o	o	xo	xo	xxx					5.00		910	5291
7	Fredrik Samuelsson	Sweden	–	–	–	o	–	o	o	o	xxo	xxx					5.00		910	5174
8	Mathias Brugger	Germany	–	–	–	–	–	–	xxo	–	xxo	–	xxx				5.00		910	5066
8	Kristjan Rosenberg	Estonia	–	–	–	o	o	o	o	xxo	xxo	xxx					5.00	PB	910	5124
10	Jiří Sýkora	Czech Republic	o	–	o	o	o	xo	xxo	xo	xxx						4.90	PB	880	5141
11	Simone Cairoli	Italy	o	–	o	o	o	xxx									4.60	PB	790	4969
12	Darko Pešić	Montenegro	–	o	–	xo	o	xxx									4.60	NR	790	5091
13	Ashley Bryant	Great Britain	o	xo	xo	xo	xxx										4.50		760	5096
14	Liam Ramsay	Great Britain	o	xxx													4.20		673	4781
	Bastien Auzeil	France															DNS		0	DNF

=== 1000 metres ===
Rank	Athlete	Nationality	Result	Notes	Points
1	Darko Pešić	Montenegro	2:38.23	NR	893
2	Mathias Brugger	Germany	2:38.73	SB	888
3	Simone Cairoli	Italy	2:40.14		872
4	Kevin Mayer	France	2:41.08		861
5	Ashley Bryant	Great Britain	2:42.19		849
6	Dominik Distelberger	Austria	2:42.32	SB	848
7	Liam Ramsay	Great Britain	2:42.94		841
8	Fredrik Samuelsson	Sweden	2:42.97	PB	841
9	Jorge Ureña	Spain	2:43.66		833
10	Adam Helcelet	Czech Republic	2:45.00	SB	819
11	Niels Pittomvils	Belgium	2:45.35		815
12	Jiří Sýkora	Czech Republic	2:50.44		761
13	Kristjan Rosenberg	Estonia	2:54.25		722
	Mihail Dudaš	Serbia	DQ	R163.3b	0

=== Final results ===
The highest mark recorded in each event is highlighted in yellow

Rank	Athlete	Nationality	60m	LJ	SP	HJ	60m H	PV	1000m	Points	Notes
1st place, gold medalist(s)	Kevin Mayer	France	6.95	7.54	15.66	2.10	7.88	5.40	2:41.08	6479	AR
2nd place, silver medalist(s)	Jorge Ureña	Spain	6.94	7.37	14.24	2.10	7.78	5.00	2:43.66	6227	
3rd place, bronze medalist(s)	Adam Helcelet	Czech Republic	7.06	7.41	15.25	2.01	7.97	5.00	2:45.00	6110	
4	Dominik Distelberger	Austria	6.94	7.38	13.55	1.92	7.80	5.10	2:42.32	6063	PB
5	Fredrik Samuelsson	Sweden	7.06	7.40	14.24	2.01	8.18	5.00	2:42.97	6015	PB
6	Darko Pešić	Montenegro	7.22	7.12	16.08	2.01	7.99	4.60	2:38.23	5984	NR
7	Niels Pittomvils	Belgium	7.22	7.12	13.83	2.04	8.31	5.40	2:45.35	5961	
8	Mathias Brugger	Germany	7.13	7.36	14.53	1.92	8.22	5.00	2:38.73	5954	
9	Ashley Bryant	Great Britain	7.06	7.66	14.57	1.98	8.12	4.50	2:42.19	5945	
10	Jiří Sýkora	Czech Republic	7.06	7.10	15.06	1.98	7.99	4.90	2:50.44	5902	
11	Kristjan Rosenberg	Estonia	7.04	7.06	14.08	2.13	8.50	5.00	2:54.25	5846	
12	Simone Cairoli	Italy	7.04	7.55	12.21	2.04	8.31	4.60	2:40.14	5841	PB
13	Liam Ramsay	Great Britain	7.12	6.81	13.62	2.04	8.11	4.20	2:42.94	5622	
14	Mihail Dudaš	Serbia	7.03	7.40	14.33	2.01	8.11	5.10	DQ	5239	
	Bastien Auzeil	France	7.19	6.76	13.90	1.95	8.30	DNS	–	DNF	
	Maicel Uibo	Estonia	7.35	NM	DNS	–	–	–	–	DNF	
