= Claudia Guri =

Andorran athlete

Personal information
- Full name: Claudia Guri Moreno
- Born: 1 May 1995 (age 31)
- Height: 1.89 m (6 ft 2 in)

Sport
- Sport: Track and field
- Events: High jump, long jump, triple jump

Achievements and titles
- Personal bests: Long jump: 5.68 metres (18 ft 8 in); Triple jump: 12.06 metres (39 ft 7 in)

Claudia Guri Moreno (born 1 May 1995 in Escaldes) is an Andorran athlete and former basketball player. She was the only representative of Andorra at the 2015 World Championships in Athletics in Beijing.

She has also played in the under-16 basketball team of Andorra.

== Competition record ==
Year	Competition	Venue	Position	Event	Notes
Representing Andorra
2011	Games of the Small States of Europe	Schaan, Liechtenstein	–	High jump	NM
2015	European Indoor Championships	Prague, Czech Republic	22nd (q)	Long jump	5.46 m
2015	European Indoor Championships	Prague, Czech Republic	22nd (q)	Triple jump	12.06 m
2015	Games of the Small States of Europe	Reykjavík, Iceland	3rd	High jump	1.68 m
2015	Games of the Small States of Europe	Reykjavík, Iceland	5th	Long jump	5.21 m
2015	Games of the Small States of Europe	Reykjavík, Iceland	4th	Triple jump	11.52 m
2015	World Championships	Beijing, China	31st (q)	Long jump	5.59 m
2016	Championships of the Small States of Europe	Marsa, Malta	2nd	High jump	1.75 m
2016	European Championships	Amsterdam, Netherlands	26th (q)	High jump	1.75 m
2017	European Indoor Championships	Belgrade, Serbia	21st (q)	High jump	1.76 m
2017	Games of the Small States of Europe	Serravalle, San Marino	3rd	High jump	1.68 m

== Personal bests ==
Outdoor

- 100 metres hurdles – 17.15 (+0.9 m/s, Tbilisi 2014)
- High jump – 1.79 (Tunis 2016)
- Pole vault – 2.40 (Marsa 2010)
- Long jump – 5.59 (+0.2 m/s, Beijing 2015)
- Triple jump – 12.16 (+1.7 m/s, Castres 2015)

Indoor

- 800 metres – 2:41.87 (Sabadell 2016)
- 60 metres hurdles – 9.97 (Sabadell 2016)
- High jump – 1.80 (Sabadell 2017)
- Long jump – 5.68 (Antequera 2015)
- Triple jump – 12.40 (Antequera 2015)
- Shot put – 8.74 (Sabadell 2015)
- Pentathlon – 3222 (Sabadell 2016)
