= Jacob El Aida Chaffey =

Maltese sprinter (born 2001)

Personal information
- Full name: Jacob El Aida Chaffey
- Nationality: Maltese
- Born: 8 November 2001 (age 24) Malta

Sport
- Country: Malta
- Sport: Track and field
- Event(s): 100 metre, 200 metre

Achievements and titles
- Personal best: 100 metre - 10.82 seconds 200 metre - 21.80 seconds

Jacob El Aida Chaffey (born 8 November 2001) is a Maltese track and field sprinter who most notably competed at the 2018 Summer Youth Olympics in Buenos Aires, and the 2018 IAAF World Indoor Championships, in Birmingham. El Aida also has a twin brother, Omar El Aida Chaffey.

At the 2018 IAAF World Indoor Championships, El Aida competed in the 60 metres event. El Aida raced in heat 1 running a time of 7.09 seconds which was a good enough time for 42nd place overall, but wasn't fast enough to qualify through to the semifinals and was 0.31 seconds away from the slowest qualifier.

At the 2018 European U18 Athletics Championships, El Aida ran the 200 m event. He was drafted into heat five in which he came fifth with a time of 22.00 seconds, equaling his personal best and qualifying him to the semifinals. In the semifinals, El Aida was drafted into race two. He ran the race in 21.60 seconds, beating his previous personal best by 0.40 seconds, with this time he gained fifth place but wasn't able to qualify to the finals.

Five days after the European U18 championships, El Aida was racing in the World U20 championships in Tampere, Finland. He was competing in the 200 m event. He was drafted into heat five and, other than Thando Dlodlo who didn't start, finished last of the eight sprinters with a time of 22.17 seconds. As a result, he was unable to advance through to the later rounds of competition.

Because of El Aida's result at the 2018 European U18 Athletics Championships in the 200 m, coming in the top eleven sprinters at the event, qualified him to compete at the 2018 Summer Youth Olympics in Buenos Aires. In stage one of the event, El Aida ran the race in 22.31 seconds placing him in 20th and the slowest stage two race. In his stage two race, El Aida ran 21.80 seconds making his final total 44.11 seconds and finishing 20th of 23 athletes.

El Aida competed in the men's 100 m and 200 m events. In the 100 metres, El Aida was drafted into heat one, he ran the race in 11.23 seconds but finished fifth, ninth overall, but wasn't fast enough to qualify for the finals. In his 200-metre race, he also finished fifth with a time of 22.74 seconds and once again ninth overall, he wasn't fast enough to advance to the finals.
