= 2013 European Athletics U23 Championships – Men's decathlon =

The Men's decathlon event at the 2013 European Athletics U23 Championships was held in Tampere, Finland, at Ratina Stadium on 11 and 12 July.

== Medalists ==
| Gold | Kai Kazmirek; Germany |
| Silver | Ilya Shkurenyov; Russia |
| Bronze | Adam Helcelet; Czech Republic |

== Results ==
=== Final ===
12 July 2013

| Rank | Name | Nationality | Points | Notes |
|---|---|---|---|---|
| 1st place, gold medalist(s) | Kai Kazmirek | Germany | 8366 | PB |
| 2nd place, silver medalist(s) | Ilya Shkurenyov | Russia | 8279 | SB |
| 3rd place, bronze medalist(s) | Adam Helcelet | Czech Republic | 8252 | PB |
| 4 | Ashley Bryant | United Kingdom | 8070 | PB |
| 5 | Fabian Rosenquist | Sweden | 7738 | PB |
| 6 | Jérémy Lelièvre | France | 7680 | SB |
| 7 | Niels Pittomvils | Belgium | 7644 | PB |
| 8 | Marek Lukáš | Czech Republic | 7606 | SB |
| 9 | Alex Folacci | France | 7576 | PB |
| 10 | Paweł Wiesiołek | Poland | 7547 | |
| 11 | Pieter Braun | Netherlands | 7540 | SB |
| 12 | Martin Roe | Norway | 7526 | |
| 13 | Christian Loosli | Switzerland | 7523 | PB |
| 14 | Darko Pešić | Montenegro | 7522 | NR |
| 15 | Vasyl Ivanytskyy | Ukraine | 7516 | |
| 16 | Otto Ylöstalo | Finland | 7476 | PB |
| 17 | Patrick Scherfose | Germany | 7444 | SB |
| 18 | Jonay Jordán | Spain | 7317 | SB |
| 19 | Juuso Hassi | Finland | 7243 | |
| 20 | Dino Dodig | Serbia | 7225 | |
| | Dominik Alberto | Switzerland | DNF | |
| | Petter Olson | Sweden | DNF | |
| | Aliaksei Spiryn | Belarus | DNF | |
| | Dmitriy Zikeyev | Russia | DNF | |
| | Johannes Hock | Germany | DNF | |
| | Viktor Fajoyomi | Hungary | DNF | |
| | Karl-Robert Saluri | Estonia | DNF | |
| | Máté Hódosi | Hungary | DNF | |

== Participation ==
According to an unofficial count, 28 athletes from 19 countries participated in the event.

- Belarus (1)
- Belgium (1)
- Czech Republic (2)
- Estonia (1)
- Finland (2)
- France (2)
- Germany (3)
- Hungary (2)
- Montenegro (1)
- Netherlands (1)
- Norway (1)
- Poland (1)
- Russia (2)
- Serbia (1)
- Spain (1)
- Sweden (2)
- Switzerland (2)
- Ukraine (1)
- United Kingdom (1)
