= Niels Pittomvils =

Belgian decathlete

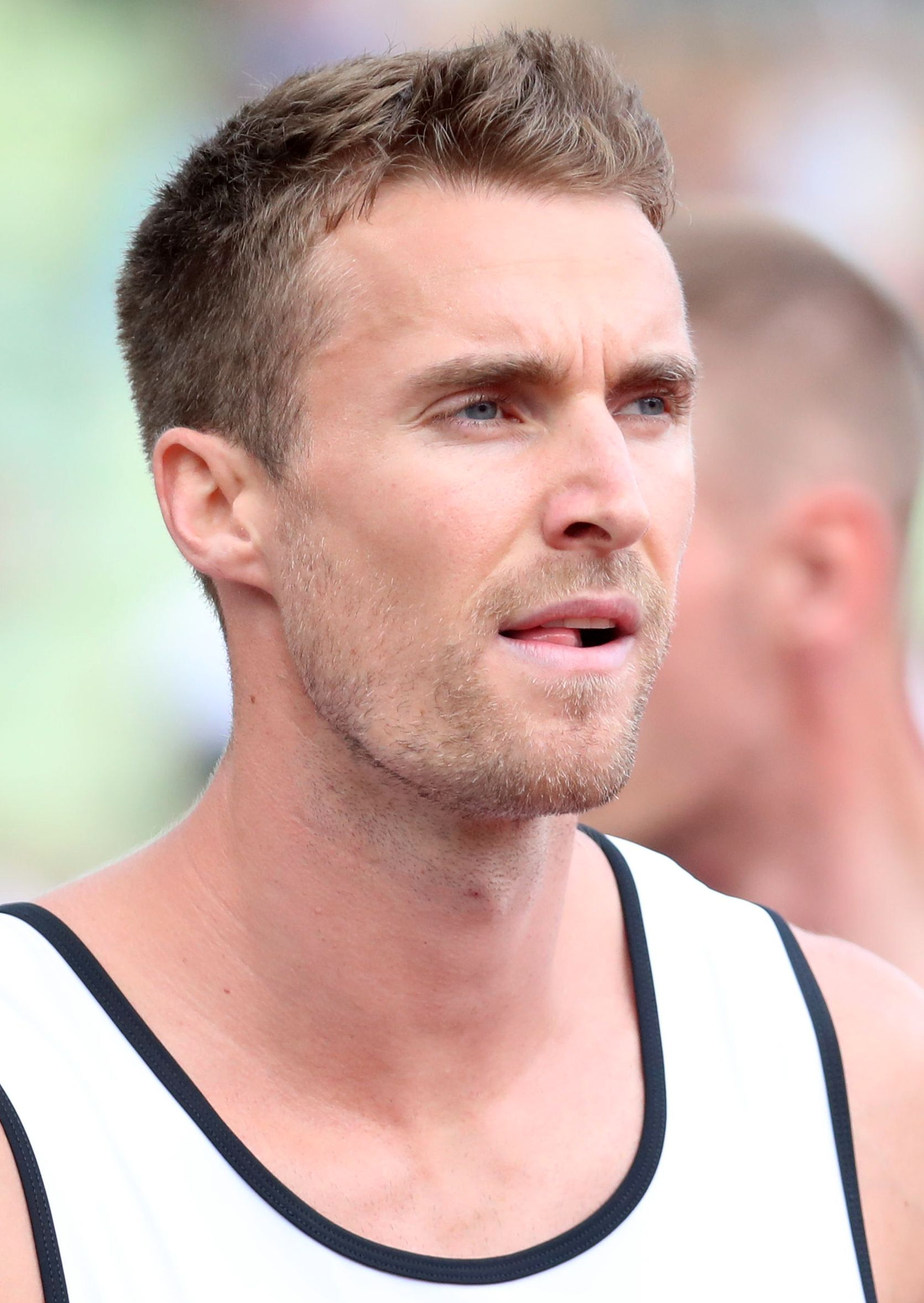
- Pittomvils, 2022

Personal information
- Born: 18 July 1992 (age 33)

Sport
- Country: Belgium
- Sport: Track and field
- Event(s): Decathlon, Heptathlon

Achievements and titles
- Personal best(s): Decathlon: 8,222 (2021); Heptathlon: 5,966 (2017)

Niels Pittomvils (born 18 July 1992) is a male decathlete from Belgium.

On the world stage he finished 22nd at the 2015 World Championships. In regional competitions he finished seventh at the 2013 European U23 Championships, fourteenth at the 2014 European Championships, did not finish at the 2015 European Indoor Championships or the 2016 European Championships, and finished seventh at the 2017 European Indoor Championships.

His personal best score is 8,222 points, achieved in May 2021 in Götzis.

== Personal bests ==
Information from World Athletics profile unless otherwise noted.

=== Outdoor ===
As of 21 June 2025

Event	Performance	Location	Date	Points
Decathlon	—N/a	Götzis	29–30 May 2021	8,222 points
100 metres	11.12 (+0.3 m/s)	Oordegem	21 May 2016	834 points
Long jump	7.40 m (24 ft 3 1/4 in) (+0.1 m/s)	Götzis	29 May 2021	910 points
Shot put	15.31 m (50 ft 2 3/4 in)	Lier	30 July 2022	809 points
High jump	2.05 m (6 ft 8 1/2 in)	Talence	14 September 2024	850 points
400 metres	48.94	Ribeira Brava	5 July 2014	864 points
110 metres hurdles	14.35 (+1.8 m/s)	Götzis	30 May 2021	930 points
Discus throw	48.35 m (158 ft 7 1/2 in)	Ratingen	23 June 2024	836 points
Pole vault	5.36 m (17 ft 7 in)	Talence	18 September 2016	1,023 points
Javelin throw	62.77 m (205 ft 11 1/4 in)	Götzis	30 May 2021	780 points
1500 metres	4:27.40	Beijing	29 August 2015	762 points
Virtual Best Performance				8,598 points

=== Indoor ===
As of 21 June 2025

Event	Performance	Location	Date	Points
Heptathlon	—N/a	Ghent	4–5 February 2017	5,966 points
60 metres	7.18	Ghent	31 January 2015	819 points
Long jump	7.23 m (23 ft 8 1/2 in)	Ghent	31 January 2015	869 points
Shot put	14.24 m (46 ft 8 1/2 in)	Ghent	28 January 2018	743 points
High jump	2.04 m (6 ft 8 1/4 in)	Belgrade	4 March 2017	840 points
60 metres hurdles	8.06	Ghent	17 February 2018	967 points
Pole vault	5.40 m (17 ft 8 1/2 in)	Ghent	5 February 2017	1,035 points
1000 metres	2:41.77	Ghent	5 February 2012	854 points
Virtual Best Performance				6,127 points
