= Lisa Marie Bezzina =

Maltese long-distance runner (born 1979)

Personal information
- Born: 5 November 1979 (age 46)

Sport
- Country: Malta
- Sport: Long-distance running
Medal record
Women's long-distance running
Representing Malta
Games of the Small States of Europe
Gold medal – first place	2019 Budva	5000 m
Gold medal – first place	2019 Budva	10,000 m
Silver medal – second place	2011 Shaan	5000 m
Silver medal – second place	2011 Shaan	10,000 m

Lisa Marie Bezzina (born 5 November 1979) is a Maltese long-distance runner. She won the gold medal in both the women's 5000 metres and women's 10,000 metres events at the 2019 Games of the Small States of Europe held Budva, Montenegro.

== Career ==
In 2015, she competed in the women's 3000 metres event at the European Games held in Baku, Azerbaijan.

In 2018, she competed in the women's half marathon at the 2018 IAAF World Half Marathon Championships held in Valencia, Spain. She also competed in the women's half marathon at the 2018 Mediterranean Games held in Tarragona, Spain. She finished in 9th place.

In 2019, she competed in the senior women's race at the 2019 IAAF World Cross Country Championships. She finished in 104th place.

In 2020, she competed in the women's half marathon at the World Athletics Half Marathon Championships held in Gdynia, Poland.
