= Kristinn Þór Kristinsson =

Icelandic middle-distance runner

Kristinn Thór Kristinsson
Personal information
- Nationality: Icelandic
- Born: 7 September 1989 (age 36)

Sport
- Sport: Track and field
- Event: 800m

Kristinn Thór Kristinsson (born 7 September 1989) is an Icelandic middle-distance runner. He competed in the 800 metres event at the 2014 IAAF World Indoor Championships.

His father is footballer Kristinn Björnsson who played for the Icelandic national team and won the Norwegian championship in 1981.
