= Kristjan Rosenberg =

Estonian athletics competitor

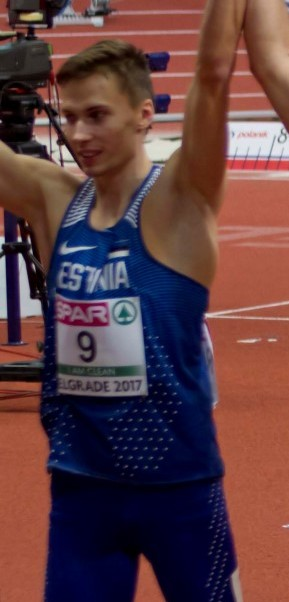
- Kristjan Rosenberg in 2017

Personal information
- Born: 16 May 1994 (age 32)
- Height: 194 cm (6 ft 4 in)
- Weight: 87 kg (192 lb)

Sport
- Country: Estonia
- Sport: Track and field
- Event: Decathlon

Achievements and titles
- Personal best(s): Decathlon: 8298; Heptathlon: 5986
- Updated on 27 June 2021

Kristjan Rosenberg (born 16 May 1994) is an Estonian decathlete.

His personal best score is 8298 points, achieved in June 2021 in Tallinn at Estonian national championships. He ranked 13th in the world that year although not making to the 2020 Summer Olympics in Tokyo. He also won Estonian nationals in 2016 in Rakvere with 7738 points.

In 2017 he won Estonian indoor national championships in heptathlon with 5986 points and qualified to 2017 European Indoor Championships.

He finished thirteenth at the 2016 European Championships and eleventh at the 2017 European Indoor Championships.
