= Darko Pešić =

Montenegrin athletics competitor

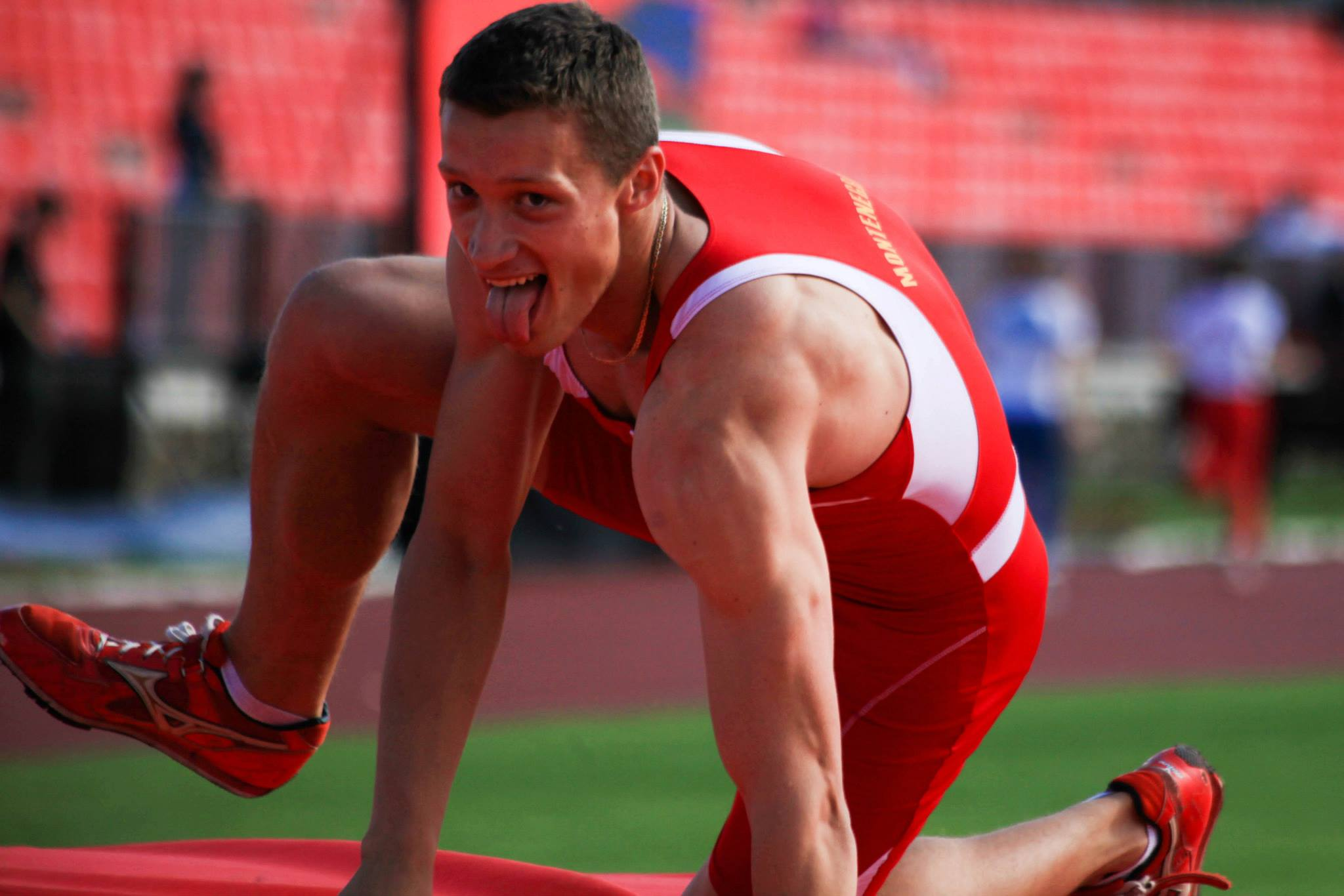
- Pešić in 2013

Personal information
- Born: 30 November 1992 (age 33) Cetinje, Montenegro, FR Yugoslavia
- Height: 1.88 m (6 ft 2 in)
- Weight: 90 kg (198 lb)

Sport
- Sport: Athletics
- Event: Decathlon
Medal record
Jeux de la Francophonie
Silver medal – second place	2013 Nice	Decathlon
Games of the Small States of Europe
Bronze medal – third place	2019 Bar	110 m hurdles
Bronze medal – third place	2019 Bar	Pole vault

Darko Pešić (born 30 November 1992) is a Montenegrin athlete competing in the combined events. He finished sixth in the heptathlon at the 2017 European Indoor Championships. He holds multiple national records in various events.

== Career ==
Pešić finished 14th in the octathlon at the 2009 World Youth Championships. He then finished 13th in the decathlon at the 2011 European Junior Championships. He moved to Novi Sad, Serbia, in 2011 to improve his training conditions.

Pešić finished 14th in the decathlon at the 2013 European U23 Championships and set the national record. He then won the decathlon silver medal at the 2013 Jeux de la Francophonie behind France's Bastien Auzeil and broke his own national record. He won the gold medal in the decathlon at the 2014 Balkan Championships.

Pešić competed at the 2015 European Games and finished seventh in the pole vault and eighth in the long jump. He won a gold medal in the decathlon at the 2016 Balkan Championships and set a new national long jump record.

Pešić finished sixth in the heptathlon at the 2017 European Indoor Championships and set the national record with 5984 points. He then missed ten months of training due to a stress fracture in his tibia. He competed at the 2018 European Championships in the decathlon but withdrew mid-way through due to an injury.

Pešić competed at the 2019 Games of the Small States of Europe and won bronze medals in the 110 metre hurdles and pole vault. Additionally, he placed sixth in the high jump and fourth in the long jump. He missed the rest of the 2019 season due to the hamstring injury. He placed eighth in the heptathlon at the 2021 European Indoor Championships. At the 2023 Games of the Small States of Europe, he finished fourth in the 110 metre hurdles, fifth in the long jump, and sixth in the discus throw.

Pešić finished 38th in the heats of the 60 metres hurdles at the 2024 World Indoor Championships. At the 2024 European Championships, he competed in the decathlon and competed barefoot in the discus throw due to fears of slipping. He ultimately finished 21st in the event.

Pešić represented Montenegro at the 2024 Summer Olympics in the 100 metres after receiving a universality spot. Two days before the preliminary round, he broke his foot in training. He still chose to compete and finished with a time of 11.85 seconds and did not advance.

== International competitions ==
Year	Competition	Venue	Position	Event	Notes
Representing Montenegro
2009	World Youth Championships	Brixen, Italy	14th	Octathlon	5288 pts
2011	European Junior Championships	Tallinn, Estonia	13th	Decathlon	7062 pts
2013	European U23 Championships	Tampere, Finland	14th	Decathlon	7522 pts
2013	Jeux de la Francophonie	Nice, France	2nd	Decathlon	7636 pts
2016	European Championships	Amsterdam, Netherlands	–	Decathlon	DNF
2017	European Indoor Championships	Belgrade, Serbia	6th	Heptathlon	5984 pts
2018	European Championships	Berlin, Germany	–	Decathlon	DNF
2019	Games of the Small States of Europe	Bar, Montenegro	3rd	110 m hurdles	14.86 s
2019	Games of the Small States of Europe	Bar, Montenegro	6th	High jump	1.95 m
2019	Games of the Small States of Europe	Bar, Montenegro	3rd	Pole vault	4.40 m
2019	Games of the Small States of Europe	Bar, Montenegro	4th	Long jump	7.15 m
2021	European Indoor Championships	Toruń, Poland	8th	Heptathlon	5824 pts
2023	Games of the Small States of Europe	Marsa, Malta	4th	110 m hurdles	14.73 s
2023	Games of the Small States of Europe	Marsa, Malta	5th	Long jump	6.59 m
2023	Games of the Small States of Europe	Marsa, Malta	6th	Discus throw	47.47 m
2024	World Indoor Championships	Glasgow, United Kingdom	38th (h)	60 m hurdles	8.37
2024	European Championships	Rome, Italy	21st	Decathlon	7421 pts
2024	Summer Olympics	Paris, France	42nd (p)	100 m	11.85 s

== Personal bests ==
Outdoor

- 100 metres – 11.25 (+1.3 m/s, Götzis 2017)
- 400 metres – 50.30 (Bar 2023)
- 1500 metres – 4:24.73 (Götzis 2017)
- 110 metres hurdles – 14.35 (+0.3 m/s, Bar 2023) NR
- High jump – 2.01 (Novi Sad 2012)
- Pole vault – 4.60 (Novi Sad 2014) NR
- Long jump – 7.33 (+0.4 m/s, Pitesti 2016) NR
- Shot put – 15.47 (Götzis 2017)
- Discus throw – 48.88 (Sremska Mitrovica 2015)
- Javelin throw – 62.57 (Split 2013)
- Decathlon – 7862 (Bar 2023) NR

Indoor

- 60 metres – 7.12 (Tallinn 2023)
- 1000 metres – 2:38.23 (Belgrade 2017)
- 60 metres hurdles – 7.95 (Belgrade 2021) NR
- High jump – 2.08 (Belgrade 2021) NR
- Pole vault – 4.72 (Belgrade 2017) NR
- Long jump – 7.24 (Belgrade 2021) NR
- Shot put – 16.69 (Belgrade 2021)
- Heptathlon – 6036 (Belgrade 2021) NR
