= Hafdís Sigurðardóttir =

Icelandic cyclist (born 1989)

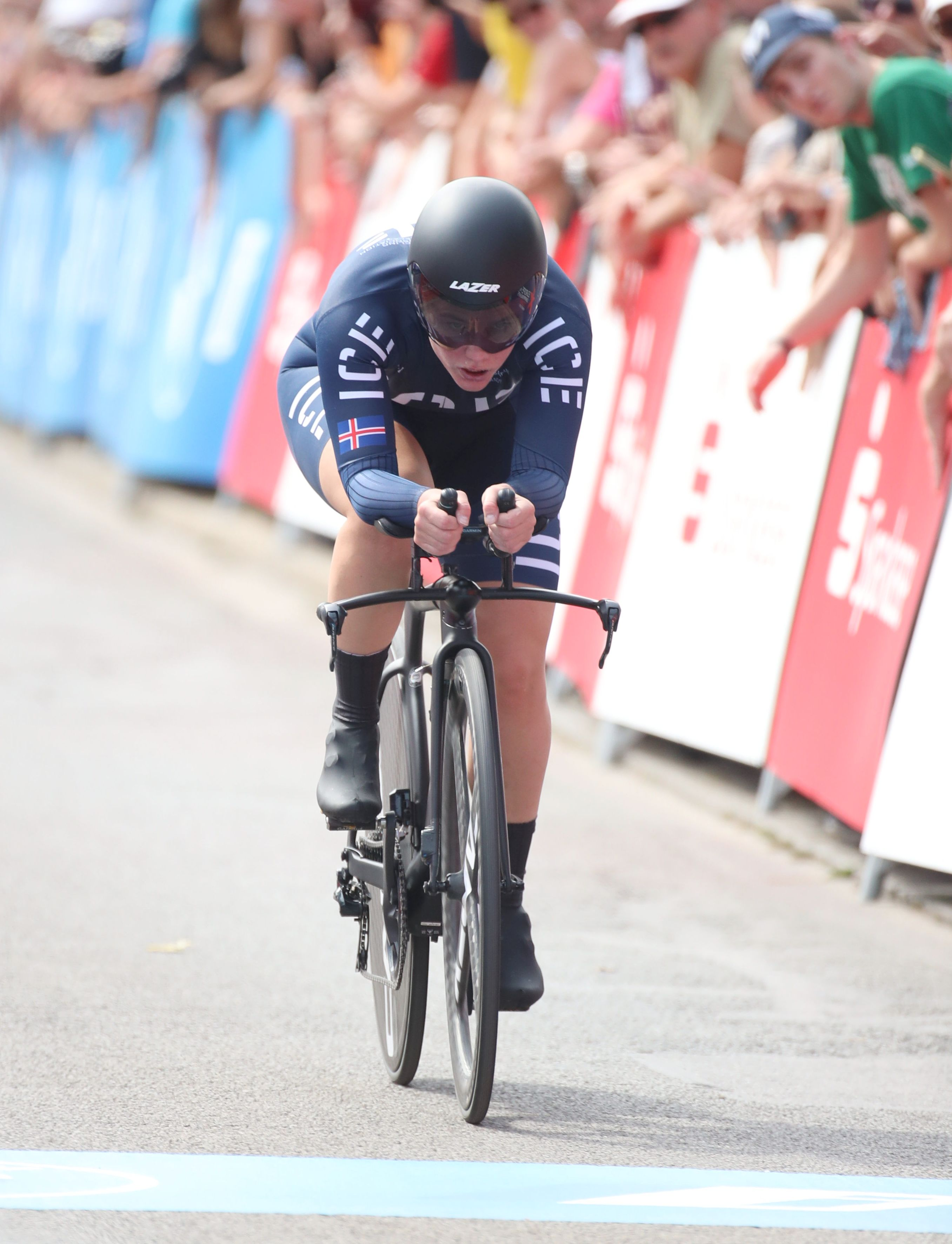

Personal information
- Born: 24 May 1989 (age 37)

Cycling career
- Sport: Cycling
- Role: Rider

Hafdís Sigurðardóttir (born 24 May 1989) is an Icelandic professional racing cyclist. She rode in the women's road race event at the 2020 UCI Road World Championships.

In 2024, Sigurðardóttir was named the Icelandic female cyclist of the year by the Icelandic Cycling Association.
