= 2023 European Athletics Team Championships Second Division =

- Host city: (Poland) Chorzów, Silesia
- Events: 37 (19 men, 19 women, 1 mixed)
- Dates: 20–22 June 2023 (afternoons and evenings)
- Main venue: Silesian Stadium

Below are the full startlists and, when confirmed, results of the 2023 European Athletics Team Championships Second Division on 21–23 June 2023 in Kraków, Poland. This edition marks the first time all divisions of the Championships had been held at a single venue. European Athletics released the full and final startlists on 16 June 2023, one week before the event.

For the first time, medals will also be awarded for individual performances across all three divisions, as part of the 2023 European Games.

== Format ==
The winner of each individual discipline and each relay shall score 16 points, the second will score one fewer, and so on. National teams, athletes or relay teams with no valid performance, disqualified or not finishing shall not score. If two or more athletes tie for a place in any event, the attributable points shall be divided equally between them. The team having the highest aggregate number of points shall be the winner of the event, and win both the gold medal and the Championship trophy.

After the conclusion of the athletics program of the European Games 2023, the following relegation and promotion is to be made for the next edition of the European Athletics Team Championships in Malaga in 2025

- the three lowest ranked teams of the First Division are relegated to the Second Division.
- the three highest ranked teams of the Second Division are then promoted to the First Division.

Races below 1500 metres will be raced in two heats, with the results amalgamated to find a final order in the event. There will be no finals in these events. In races from 1500 metres upwards, one heat of 16 will take part. In the field events, each event will be broken into two pools. Both heats and pools will be seeded so that the highest ranked athletes compete together, with the exception of the final relays, which will be seeded by overall standings one hour before the event.

== Overall standings ==
Rank	Nation	Points	Notes
1	Hungary	456.50	Promoted to First Division for 2025
2	Ukraine	435.50	Promoted to First Division for 2025
3	Lithuania	372.50	Promoted to First Division for 2025
4	Slovenia	372	
5	Romania	344	
6	Denmark	312	
7	Serbia	307	
8	Slovakia	302	
9	Croatia	301.50	
10	Estonia	298.50	
11	Bulgaria	298.50	
12	Cyprus	288	
13	Latvia	283.50	
14	Iceland	246.50	Relegated to Third Division for 2025
15	Luxembourg	198	Relegated to Third Division for 2025
16	Moldova	170	Relegated to Third Division for 2025

== Men's events ==
=== 100 metres ===
Rank	Heat	Lane	Nation	Athlete	Result	Notes	Match points
1	A	4	Slovakia	Ján Volko	10.24	SB	16
2	A	6	Estonia	Karl Erik Nazarov	10.29		15
3	A	5	Slovenia	Anej Čurin Prapotnik	10.34		14
4	A	7	Ukraine	Andrii Vasyliev	10.41 (.402)		13
5	A	8	Serbia	Aleksa Kijanović	10.41 (.408)	SB	12
6	A	3	Denmark	Tobias Larsen	10.51 (.502)		11
7	A	2	Iceland	Kolbeinn Höður Gunnarsson	10.51 (.510)	NR	10
8	B	4	Romania	Cristian Roiban	10.62 (.611)		9
9	B	5	Cyprus	Stavros Avgoustinou	10.62 (.616)		8
10	B	7	Latvia	Oskars Grava	10.63 (.621)		7
11	B	3	Bulgaria	Hristo Iliev	10.63 (.623)		6
12	A	9	Hungary	Bence Boros	10.64		5
13	B	6	Lithuania	Kristupas Seikauskas	10.72		4
14	B	2	Croatia	Toma Batistić	10.91	SB	3
15	B	9	Luxembourg	Pol Bidaine	10.93	SB	2
16	B	8	Moldova	Ian-Gheorghe Vieru	11.02		1
Wind A: -0.5 m/s B: -0.7 m/s		WR: (Jamaica) Usain Bolt - 9.58; ER: (Italy) Marcell Jacobs - 9.80 EL: (United Kingdom) Eugene Amo-Dadzie - 9.93; CR: (France) Christophe Lemaitre - 9.95					

=== 200 metres ===
Rank	Heat	Lane	Nation	Athlete	Result	Notes	Match points
1	A	6	Slovakia	Ján Volko	20.53	SB	16
2	A	8	Lithuania	Gediminas Truskauskas	20.60	SB	15
3	A	5	Latvia	Oskars Grava	20.87	PB	14
4	B	6	Hungary	Zoltán Wahl	20.92	PB	13
5	A	2	Estonia	Karl Erik Nazarov	20.94	PB	12
6	A	7	Iceland	Kolbeinn Höður Gunnarsson	20.98		11
7	B	7	Serbia	Boško Kijanović	21.01	SB	10
8	B	9	Ukraine	Stanislav Kovalenko	21.07	SB	9
9	A	4	Bulgaria	Slavi Mutafov	21.20		8
10	B	4	Denmark	Jacob Hvorup	21.23	PB	7
11	A	3	Romania	Marian Valentin Tanase	21.26		6
12	B	2	Moldova	Ian-Gheorghe Vieru	21.52	SB	5
13	B	8	Luxembourg	David Wallig	21.55		4
14	B	5	Cyprus	Stavros Avgoustinou	21.57		3
15	B	3	Croatia	Marko Orešković	21.69		2
-	A	9	Slovenia	Matevž Šuštaršič	DNF		-
Wind A: -1.0 m/s B: -0.8 m/s		WR: (Jamaica) Usain Bolt - 19.19; ER: (Italy) Pietro Mennea - 19.72 EL: (United Kingdom) Zharnel Hughes - 20.14; CR: (Turkey) Ramil Guliyev - 20.20					

=== 400 metres ===
Rank	Heat	Lane	Nation	Athlete	Result	Notes	Match points
1	A	5	Hungary	Attila Molnár	45.30	NU23R	16
2	A	7	Ukraine	Oleksandr Pohorilko	45.31	PB	15
3	A	9	Romania	Mihai Sorin Dringo	45.76	NU23R	14
4	A	4	Denmark	Gustav Lundholm Nielsen	45.80	PB	13
5	A	8	Serbia	Boško Kijanović	45.97		12
6	A	2	Slovenia	Rok Ferlan	46.06	PB	11
7	A	6	Lithuania	Tomas Keršulis	46.36		10
8	B	6	Latvia	Artūrs Pastors	46.59	PB	9
9	A	3	Slovakia	Šimon Bujna	46.89		8
10	B	5	Croatia	Marko Orešković	47.09		7
11	B	8	Bulgaria	Yordan Gyurov	47.33	PB	6
12	B	7	Moldova	Ivan Galuşco	47.46		5
13	B	4	Cyprus	Paisios Dimitriadis	47.54	PB	4
14	B	9	Estonia	Lukas Lessel	48.02		3
15	B	2	Luxembourg	Philippe Hilger	48.27	PB	2
16	B	3	Iceland	Samundur Ólafsson	48.63	PB	1
WR: (South Africa) Wayde van Niekerk - 43.03; ER: (East Germany) Thomas Schönlebe - 44.33 EL: (Norway) HåvardIngvaldsen - 44.86; CR: (Belgium) Jonathan Borlée - 44.99

=== 800 metres ===
Rank	Heat	Lane	Nation	Athlete	Result	Notes	Match points
1	A	5	Croatia	Marino Bloudek	1:47.11 (.101)		16
2	A	4	Hungary	Dániel Huller	1:47.11 (.106)		15
3	A	2	Ukraine	Oleh Myronets	1:47.86	PB	14
4	A	6	Slovenia	Jan Vukovič	1:48.18		13
5	A	9	Romania	Cristian Gabriel Voicu	1:48.48		12
6	A	8	Cyprus	Stavros Spyrou	1:49.30		11
7	B	7	Bulgaria	Ivan Ivanov	1:49.33	PB	10
8	B	3	Lithuania	Simas Bertašius	1:49.55	SB	9
9	A	7	Latvia	Oskars Bambals	1:49.61		8
10	B	4	Luxembourg	Mathis Espagnet	1:49.75		7
11	B	5	Slovakia	Filip Bielek	1:50.18	PB	6
12	B	9	Iceland	Baldvin Magnusson	1:50.50	PB	5
13	B	6	Denmark	Andreas Holst Lange	1:50.59	PB	4
14	B	2	Serbia	Aleksa Milanović	1:50.76	PB	3
15	A	3	Estonia	Jake Patrick Bagge	1:51.14		2
16	B	8	Moldova	Adrian Iordan	1:52.39		1
WR: (Kenya) David Rudisha - 1:40.91; ER: (Denmark) Wilson Kipketer - 1:41.11 EL: (France) Benjamin Robert - 1:43.48; CR: (Italy) Giordano Benedetti - 1:45.11

=== 1500 metres ===
Rank	Nation	Athlete	Result	Notes	Match points
1	Serbia	Elzan Bibić	3:41.35		16
2	Luxembourg	Charles Grethen	3:41.76		15
3	Denmark	Kristian Uldbjerg Hansen	3:41.87		14
4	Lithuania	Simas Bertašius	3:43.01		13
5	Hungary	István Szögi	3:43.30		12
6	Iceland	Baldvin Magnusson	3:43.38		11
7	Latvia	Janis Razgalis	3:44.93		10
8	Ukraine	Dmytrii Nikolaichuk	3:45.44		9
9	Romania	Nicolae Marian Coman	3:46.09		8
10	Slovakia	Peter Kováč	3:48.16	SB	7
11	Moldova	Ivan Siuris	3:48.42	PB	6
12	Slovenia	Rok Markelj	3:48.62		5
13	Bulgaria	Martin Balabanov	3:49.11	PB	4
14	Croatia	Nino Jambrešić	3:49.75		3
15	Estonia	Deniss Šalkauskas	3:49.76		2
16	Cyprus	Andrea Gacumi Michara	3:49.95	PB	1
WR: (Morocco) Hicham El Guerrouj - 3:26.00; ER: (Norway) Jakob Ingebrigtsen - 3:27.95 EL: (Norway) Jakob Ingebrigtsen - 3:27.95; CR: (Czech Republic) Jakub Holuša - 3:37.74

=== 5000 metres ===
Rank	Nation	Athlete	Result	Notes	Match points
1	Serbia	Elzan Bibić	13:53.95	SB	16
2	Cyprus	Amine Khadiri	13:54.71	PB	15
3	Bulgaria	Ivo Balabanov	13:56.99	SB	14
4	Slovakia	Peter Ďurec	13:58.22	PB	13
5	Denmark	Mikael Johnsen	14:05.65		12
6	Ukraine	Bohdan-Ivan Horodyskyi	14:06.00		11
7	Luxembourg	Bob Bertemes	14:07.50	PB	10
8	Estonia	Leonid Latsepov	14:08.73	SB	9
9	Hungary	Ferenc Soma Kovács	14:12.28	SB	8
10	Lithuania	Giedrius Valinčius	14:13.93		7
11	Iceland	Hlynur Andrésson	14:27.80	SB	6
12	Moldova	Maxim Răileanu	14:35.11	SB	5
13	Romania	Dragoș Luca Pop	14:37.43		4
14	Latvia	Uģis Jocis	15:14.01		3
15	Croatia	Dino Bošnjak	15:17.21		2
-	Slovenia	Vid Botolin	DQ	TR 6.3.6	-
WR: (Uganda) Joshua Cheptegei - 12:35.36; ER: (Norway) Jakob Ingebrigtsen - 12:48.45 EL: (Spain) Mohamed Katir - 12:52.09; CR: (Italy) Yermane'e Crippa - 13:17.23

=== 3000 metres steeplechase ===
Rank	Nation	Athlete	Result	Notes	Match points
1	Hungary	István Palkovits	8:43.82		16
2	Bulgaria	Ivo Balabanov	8:47.69	SB	15
3	Denmark	Jakob Dybdal Abrahamsen	8:53.86		14
4	Croatia	Bruno Belčić	8:56.61	SB	13
5	Latvia	Edgars Šumskis	8:56.84		12
6	Luxembourg	Gil Weicherding	8:56.89	SB	11
7	Romania	Damian Didier Mititelu	8:57.63	PB	10
8	Ukraine	Roman Rostikus	8:59.73		9
9	Slovakia	Dávid Mazúch	9:01.75		8
10	Slovenia	Klemen Vilhar	9:04.33	PB	7
11	Lithuania	Giedrius Valinčius	9:05.05		6
12	Iceland	Hlynur Andrésson	9:13.26	SB	5
13	Estonia	Kalev Hõlpus	9:19.90		4
14	Cyprus	Giorgos Tofi	9:22.34	PB	3
15	Moldova	Nicolae Pavlenco	9:23.13	SB	2
16	Serbia	Milos Milosavljević	10:26.43		1
WR: (Ethiopia) Lamecha Girma - 7:52.11; ER: (France) M M-Benabbad - 8:00.09 EL: (Spain) Daniel Arce - 8:10.63; CR: (Spain) Yoann Kowal - 8:25.50

=== 110 metres hurdles ===
Rank	Heat	Lane	Nation	Athlete	Result	Notes	Match points
1	A	4	Cyprus	Milan Trajkovic	13.38	SB	16
2	A	5	Hungary	Bálint Szeles	13.68		15
3	A	7	Romania	Alin Ionuț Anton	13.80		14
4	B	3	Bulgaria	Stanislav Stankov	13.94	SB	13
5	A	3	Serbia	Bogdan Vidojković	13.98		12
6	A	2	Luxembourg	François Grailet	13.99 (.981)	SB	11
7	A	6	Slovenia	Filip Jakob Demšar	13.99 (.983)		10
8	A	9	Ukraine	Oleh Kukota	14.08 (.074)	PB	9
9	B	5	Estonia	Kenro Tohter	14.08 (.077)	PB	8
10	A	8	Croatia	Lukas Cik	14.27		7
11	B	7	Denmark	Andreas Christoffersen	14.45		6
12	B	4	Lithuania	Edgaras Benkunskas	14.49		5
13	B	6	Latvia	Ralfs Zazerskis	14.53		4
14	B	8	Iceland	Ísak Óli Traustason	15.07		3
15	B	2	Slovakia	Dominik Labuda	15.21	SB	2
Wind A: +0.5 m/s B: +0.1 m/s		WR: (United States) Aries Merritt – 12.80; ER: (United Kingdom) Colin Jackson - 12.91 EL: (France) Just Kwaou-Mathey - 13.09; CR: (Russia) Sergey Shubenkov - 13.20					

- DNE : Moldova

=== 400 metres hurdles ===
Rank	Heat	Lane	Nation	Athlete	Result	Notes	Match points
1	A	9	Estonia	Rasmus Mägi	48.63	SB	16
2	A	5	Slovenia	Matic Ian Guček	49.48	EU23L	15
3	A	6	Slovakia	Matej Baluch	49.56	PB	14
4	A	7	Serbia	Nikola Kostić	49.77	EU20L	13
5	A	3	Lithuania	Rapolas Saulius	51.64	PB	12
6	B	6	Iceland	Ívar Kristinn Jasonarson	51.68	PB	11
7	A	8	Hungary	Árpád Bánóczy	51.69		10
8	A	2	Ukraine	Rostyslav Holubovych	52.01		9
9	A	4	Romania	Vlad Dulcescu	52.10		8
10	B	8	Cyprus	Anastasios Vasileiou	52.56	PB	7
11	B	5	Latvia	Aleks Pelcmanis	53.07		6
12	B	3	Denmark	Joel von de Ahé	53.24	SB	5
13	B	7	Moldova	Cristin Eşanu	53.36		4
14	B	4	Croatia	Mateo Parlov	53.93	SB	3
15	B	9	Bulgaria	Yordan Gyurov	56.88		2
-	B	2	Luxembourg	David Friederich	DQ	TR 17.3.1	-
WR: (Norway) Karsten Warholm - 45.94; ER: (Norway) Karsten Warholm - 45.94 EL: (Norway) Karsten Warholm - 46.42; CR: (Norway) Karsten Warholm - 48.46

=== High jump ===
Rank	Nation	Athlete	Result	Notes	Match points
1	Bulgaria	Tihomir Ivanov	2.24	SB	16
2	Serbia	Slavko Stević	2.24	PB	15
3	Ukraine	Oleh Doroshchuk	2.24		14
4	Cyprus	Vasilios Konstantinou	2.21	SB	13
5	Lithuania	Juozas Baikštys	2.15		11.50
5	Hungary	Gergely Török	2.15		11.50
7	Slovenia	Sandro Jeršin Tomassini	2.11		9.50
7	Estonia	Hendrik Lillemets	2.11	SB	9.50
9	Denmark	Mads Moos Larsen	2.11	PB	8
10	Romania	Marius Cristian Dumitrache	2.07		7
11	Luxembourg	Charel Gaspar	2.02		6
12	Iceland	Elías Óli Hilmarsson	2.02		5
13	Croatia	Matrin Mlinarič	1.97		4
14	Slovakia	Lukáš Beer	1.97		2.50
14	Latvia	Valters Jansons	1.97		2.50
16	Moldova	Platon Tacu	1.91		1
WR: (Cuba) Javier Sotomayor - 2.45; ER: (Sweden) Patrik Sjöberg - 2.42 EL: (Poland) Norbert Kobielski - 2.27; CR: (Ukraine) Dmytro Dem'yanyuk - 2.35

=== Pole vault ===
Rank	Nation	Athlete	Result	Notes	Match points
1	Croatia	Ivan Horvat	5.40		15.50
1	Ukraine	Vladislav Malykhin	5.40		15.50
3	Estonia	Eerik Haamer	5.30	SB	14
4	Latvia	Valters Kreišs	5.20		13
5	Bulgaria	Evgeni Enev	5.20	SB	12
6	Hungary	Marcell Nagy	5.05		11
7	Slovenia	Robert Renner	4.90		9.50
7	Slovakia	Alan Černý	4.90	PB	9.50
9	Denmark	Aske Petersen	4.90		8
10	Romania	Razvan Doroftei	4.70		7
11	Lithuania	Nikodemas Laurynas	4.70		6
12	Luxembourg	Joe Seil	4.50	SB	5
13	Iceland	Thorleifur Einar Leifsson	4.00		4
14	Serbia	Luka Tomić	3.40		3
-	Cyprus	Christos Tamanis	NM		-
WR: (Sweden) Armand Duplantis - 6.23; ER: (Sweden) Armand Duplantis - 6.23 EL: (Sweden) Armand Duplantis - 6.23; CR: (France) Renaud Lavillenie - 6.01

- DNE : Moldova

=== Long jump ===
Rank	Nation	Athlete	Result	Notes	Match Points
1	Croatia	Marko Čeko	7.86	SB	16
2	Lithuania	Marius Vadeikis	7.80	=PB	15
3	Bulgaria	Bozhidar Sarâboyukov	7.78		14
4	Romania	Gabriel Bitan	7.68		13
5	Hungary	Kristóf Pap	7.67		12
6	Serbia	Strahinja Jovančević	7.66		11
7	Ukraine	Sergey Nykyforov	7.56		10
8	Iceland	Daníel Ingi Egilsson	7.48		9
9	Cyprus	Antreas Machallekides	7.39		8
10	Estonia	Hernik Kutberg	7.28	SB	7
11	Slovenia	Dino Subašič	7.26		6
12	Latvia	Sandis Dzenītis	7.23		5
13	Denmark	Bertram Costa	7.04		4
14	Luxembourg	Luis Muller	6.97	PB	3
15	Moldova	Vadim Doscalov	6.79	SB	2
-	Slovakia	Michal Bačik	NM		-
WR: (United States) Mike Powell - 8.95; ER: (Soviet Union) Robert Emmiyan - 8.86 EL: (Switzerland) Simon Ehammer - 8.32; CR: (Greece) Miltiadis Tentoglou - 8.38

=== Triple jump ===
Rank	Nation	Athlete	Results	Notes	Match points
1	Ukraine	Vladyslav Shepeliev	16.67	EU23L	16
2	Iceland	Daníel Ingi Egilsson	15.82		15
3	Bulgaria	Lâchezar Vâlchev	15.57		14
4	Moldova	Vadim Doscalov	15.56		13
5	Latvia	Sandis Dzenītis	15.55	PB	12
6	Hungary	Dániel Szenderffy	15.50		11
7	Romania	Răzvan Cristian Grecu	15.36		10
8	Estonia	Viktor Morozov	15.23		9
9	Slovenia	Jan Luxa	15.17		8
10	Cyprus	Grigoris Nikolaou	15.15		7
11	Lithuania	Gustas Griška	14.92		6
12	Slovakia	Matúš Blšták	14.75		5
13	Croatia	Filip Kozina	14.42		4
14	Luxembourg	Louis Muller	14.41	PB	3
15	Serbia	Aleksa Ratinac	13.66		2
16	Denmark	Dennis Mägi	13.18		1
WR: (United Kingdom) Jonathan Edwards - 18.29; ER: (United Kingdom) Jonathan Edwards - 18.29 EL: (Italy) Andy Diaz Hernandez - 17.75; CR: (Portugal) Nelson Évora - 17.59

=== Shot put ===
Rank	Nation	Athlete	Result	Notes	Match Points
1	Croatia	Filip Mihaljević	21.33		16
2	Ukraine	Roman Kokoshko	20.46		15
3	Serbia	Armin Sinančević	20.42		14
4	Romania	Andrei Rares Toader	19.84		13
5	Luxembourg	Bob Bertemes	19.42		12
6	Slovenia	Blaž Zupančič	19.20		11
7	Estonia	Jander Heil	18.87		10
8	Iceland	Guðni Valur Guðnason	18.21		9
9	Hungary	Balázs Tóth	18.04		8
10	Slovakia	Adrián Baran	18.02	SB	7
11	Lithuania	Šarūnas Banevičius	16.93		6
12	Latvia	Edgars Berķis	16.50	PB	5
13	Denmark	Kenneth Mertz	16.35		4
14	Cyprus	Petros Michaelides	16.05		3
15	Moldova	Alexandr Mazur	15.58		2
16	Bulgaria	Galin Kostadinov	14.99		1
WR: (United States) Ryan Crouser - 23.56; ER: (East Germany) Ulf Timmermann - 23.06 EL: (Italy) Zane Weir - 21.74; CR: (Poland) Michał Haratyk - 21.83

=== Discus throw ===
Rank	Nation	Athlete	Result	Notes	Match points
1	Slovenia	Kristjan Čeh	69.94	CR	16
2	Lithuania	Andrius Gudžius	64.94		15
3	Iceland	Guðni Valur Guðnason	63.34		14
4	Ukraine	Mykyta Nesterenko	62.42	SB	13
5	Romania	Alin Alexandru Firfirica	61.82		12
6	Croatia	Martin Marković	61.72		11
7	Hungary	Róbert Szikszai	59.80		10
8	Luxembourg	Bob Bertemes	59.01		9
9	Latvia	Aleksandrs Volkovs	56.10	PB	8
10	Cyprus	Giorgos Koniarakis	55.57		7
11	Denmark	Emil Mikkelsen	52.43		6
12	Slovakia	Samuel Kováč	51.89		5
13	Moldova	Alexandr Mazur	49.29	SB	4
14	Serbia	Petar Ilić	46.42		3
15	Bulgaria	Deyan Gemizhev	46.11		2
-	Estonia	Kevin Sakson	NM		-
WR: (East Germany) Jürgen Schult - 74.08; ER: (East Germany) Jürgen Schult - 74.08 EL: (Slovenia) Kristjan Čeh - 71.86; CR: (Estonia) Gerd Kanter - 68.76

=== Hammer throw ===
Rank	Nation	Athlete	Result	Notes	Match points
1	Ukraine	Mykhaylo Kokhan	77.03	SB	16
2	Hungary	Donát Varga	73.75		15
3	Estonia	Adam Kelly	73.08	SB	14
4	Croatia	Matija Gregurić	72.91		13
5	Cyprus	Alexandros Poursanidis	71.71		12
6	Slovakia	Marcel Lomnický	71.69		11
7	Moldova	Serghei Marghiev	70.56		10
8	Lithuania	Tomas Vasiliauskas	68.73		9
9	Bulgaria	Valentin Andreev	67.42		8
10	Serbia	Jovan Stranić	66.55		7
11	Slovenia	Jakob Urbanč	64.27		6
12	Romania	Dragos Ionut Nicorici	64.07		5
13	Denmark	Stefan Lehnert	63.16		4
14	Latvia	Igors Sokolovs	51.94		3
15	Luxembourg	Steve Weiwert	46.90	PB	2
-	Iceland	Hilmar Örn Jónsson	NM		-
WR: (Soviet Union) Yuriy Sedykh - 86.74; ER: (Soviet Union) Yuriy Sedykh - 86.74 EL: (Poland) Wojciech Nowicki - 81.92; CR: (Poland) Paweł Fajdek - 82.98

=== Javelin throw ===
Rank	Nation	Athlete	Result	Notes	Match points
1	Lithuania	Edis Matusevičius	84.22	SB	16
2	Ukraine	Artur Felfner	82.24	EU23L	15
3	Moldova	Andrian Mardare	80.16		14
4	Hungary	Norbert Rivasz-Tóth	78.25		13
5	Romania	Alexandru Mihaita Novac	77.83	SB	12
6	Slovenia	Anže Durjava	75.09		11
7	Slovakia	Maximilian Slezák	73.78		10
8	Denmark	Arthur W. Petersen	73.29		9
9	Bulgaria	Mark Slavov	72.32	SB	8
10	Iceland	Dagbjartur Dadi Jonsson	72.00		7
11	Estonia	Kunnar Erich Viisel	69.70	SB	6
12	Cyprus	Spyros Savva	69.67		5
13	Serbia	Vedran Samac	67.70		4
14	Croatia	Arno Marković	64.79		3
15	Latvia	Zigismunds Sirmais	63.86		2
16	Luxembourg	Max Wagner	45.18	SB	1
WR: (Czech Republic) Jan Železný - 98.48; ER: (Czech Republic) Jan Železný - 98.48 EL: (Czech Republic) Jakub Vadlejch - 89.51; CR: (Germany) Johannes Vetter - 96.29

=== 4 x 100 metres relay ===
Rank	Heat	Lane	Nation	Members	Result	Notes	Match points
1	A	7	Ukraine	Erik Kostrytsya; Andrii Vasyliev; Stanislav Kovalenko; Oleksandr Sokolov	39.03	SB	16
2	A	8	Slovenia	Jernej Gumilar; Matevž Šuštaršič; Andrej Skočir; Anej Čurin Prapotnik	39.29	SB	15
3	A	9	Hungary	Dominik Illovszky; Bence Boros; Dániel Szabó; Patrik Bundschu	39.67	SB	14
4	B	6	Estonia	Henri Sai; Reimo Sepp; Ken-Mark Minkovski; Karl Erik Nazarov	39.68	SB	13
5	A	4	Romania	Alin Ionuț Anton; Marian Valentin Tanase; Andrei Neagoe; Cristian Roiban	39.77	SB	12
6	B	8	Latvia	Mikus Pēterson; Roberts Jānis Zālītis; Oskars Grava; Ričards Peders	39.87	SB	11
7	B	4	Serbia	Danilo Majstorović; Boško Kijanović; Stefan Kaljuš; Aleksa Kijanović	39.99	SB	10
8	A	6	Bulgaria	Antonio Ivanov; Nikola Karamanolov; Hristo Iliev; Slavi Mutafov	40.05	SB	9
9	A	2	Lithuania	Kristupas Seikauskas; Tomas Keršulis; Kostas Skrabulis; Gediminas Truskauskas	40.10	SB	8
10	B	9	Iceland	Gylfi Ingvan Gylfason; Kristófer Thorgrimsson; Dagur Andri Einarsson; Kolbeinn Höður Gunnarsson	40.27	NR	7
11	B	5	Cyprus	Ioannis Andreou; Paisios Dimitriadis; Alex Beechey; Stavros Avgoustinou	40.61	SB	6
12	B	7	Slovakia	Michal Bačík; Filip Federič; Samuel Beladič; Jakub Nemec	40.71	SB	5
13	B	3	Luxembourg	François Grailet; Pol Bidaine; Olivier Boussong; David Wallig	40.98	NR	4
14	A	3	Croatia	Toma Batistić; Hrvoje Kašik; Bruno Perec; Vito Kovačić	41.40	SB	3
-	A	5	Denmark	Tobias Larsen; Tazana Mikkel Kamanga-Dyrbak; Jacob Hvorup; Frederik Schou-Nielsen	DNF		-
-	B	2	Moldova	Alexandru Zatic; Ian-Gheorghe Vieru; Daniel Mititelu; Cristin Eșanu	DNF		-
WR: Jamaica - 36.94; ER: (United Kingdom) Great Britain and N.I. - 37.36 EL: France - 38.22; CR: (United Kingdom) Great Britain and N.I. - 38.08

== Women's events ==
=== 100 metres ===
Rank	Heat	Lane	Nation	Athlete	Result	Notes	Match points
1	A	4	Luxembourg	Patrizia van der Weken	11.24		16
2	A	8	Cyprus	Olivia Fotopoulou	11.34	PB	15
3	A	5	Hungary	Boglárka Takács	11.36		14
4	A	3	Serbia	Ivana Ilić	11.47	SB	13
5	A	6	Slovakia	Monika Weigertová	11.51		12
6	B	5	Ukraine	Diana Honcharenko	11.55	PB	11
7	A	7	Estonia	Õilme Võro	11.65		10
8	B	7	Slovenia	Lucija Potnik	11.68 (.675)		9
9	B	8	Lithuania	Evan Misiūnaitè	11.68 (.676)	SB	8
10	A	9	Latvia	Sindija Bukša	11.69		7
11	B	3	Iceland	Guðbjörg Jóna Bjarnadóttir	11.70	SB	6
12	B	6	Croatia	Vita Penezić	11.72		5
13	B	4	Bulgaria	Radina Velichkova	11.73 (.721)		4
14	B	2	Romania	Marina Andreea Baboi	11.73 (.729)	SB	3
15	A	2	Denmark	Mathilde U. Kramer	11.76		2
16	B	9	Moldova	Diana Podoleanu	12.16	SB	1
Wind A: -0.3 m/s B: +0.9 m/s		WR: (United States) F Griffith-Joyner - 10.49; ER: (France) Christine Arron - 10.73 EL: (United Kingdom) Daryll Neita - 10.97; CR: (Bulgaria) Ivet Lalova-Collio - 11.11					

=== 200 metres ===
Rank	Heat	Lane	Nation	Athlete	Result	Notes	Match points
1	A	6	Cyprus	Olivia Fotopoulou	22.71	PB	16
2	B	7	Luxembourg	Patrizia van der Weken	23.19	NR	15
3	A	7	Hungary	Alexa Sulyán	23.25		14
4	A	9	Ukraine	Tetiana Kaisen	23.28	PB	13
5	A	4	Latvia	Gunta Vaičule	23.32	SB	12
6	B	5	Denmark	Emma Beiter Bomme	23.47	PB	11
7	A	5	Serbia	Ivana Ilić	23.53		10
8	A	9	Estonia	Ann Marii Kivikas	23.55		9
9	A	2	Romania	Maria Valeria Bisericescu	23.62		8
10	B	8	Bulgaria	Kristen Radukanova	23.68	PB	7
11	B	9	Lithuania	Lukrecija Sabaitytė	23.71	SB	6
12	B	6	Slovenia	Agata Zupin	23.73	SB	5
13	A	3	Croatia	Veronika Drljačić	23.91		4
14	B	4	Iceland	Guðbjörg Jóna Bjarnadóttir	24.13		3
15	B	3	Slovakia	Lenka Kovačovicová	24.28		2
16	B	2	Moldova	Diana Podoleanu	25.03	SB	1
Wind A: +1.0 m/s B: +1.0 m/s		WR: (United States) F Griffith Joyner - 21.34; ER: (Netherlands) Dafne Schippers - 21.63 EL: (United Kingdom) Daryll Neita - 22.23; CR: (Netherlands) Dafne Schippers - 22.45					

=== 400 metres ===
Rank	Heat	Lane	Nation	Athlete	Result	Notes	Match points
1	A	7	Romania	Andrea Miklós	50.67	PB	16
2	A	3	Lithuania	Modesta Juste Morauskaitė	51.61	SB	15
3	A	8	Hungary	Janka Molnár	51.74	NU23R	14
4	A	9	Slovenia	Anita Horvat	51.80	SB	13
5	A	5	Latvia	Gunta Vaičule	52.12	SB	12
6	A	6	Ukraine	Kateryna Karpiuk	52.45	SB	11
7	A	4	Croatia	Veronika Drljačić	52.97	PB	10
8	B	6	Bulgaria	Deva-Mariya Dragieva	53.36	PB	9
9	A	2	Serbia	Maja Ćirić	53.69	SB	8
10	B	5	Slovakia	Alexandra Bezeková	53.85	SB	7
11	B	8	Cyprus	Kalliopi Kountouri	54.13	PB	6
12	B	4	Estonia	Viola Hambidge	55.22	PB	5
13	B	9	Luxembourg	Fanny Arendt	56.39	SB	4
14	B	2	Moldova	Tatiana Contrebuț	56.76	PB	3
15	B	3	Iceland	Ingibjörg Sigurðardóttir	58.52		2
16	B	7	Denmark	Anna Øbakke Lange	1:03.63		1
WR: (East Germany) Marita Koch - 47.60; ER: (East Germany) Marita Koch - 47.60 EL: (Republic of Ireland) Rhasidat Adeleke - 49.20; CR: (Netherlands) Femke Bol - 50.37

=== 800 metres ===
Rank	Heat	Lane	Nation	Athlete	Result	Notes	Match points
1	A	6	Ukraine	Natalia Krol	1:59.77	SB	16
2	A	5	Hungary	Bianka Kéri	1:59.80	PB	15
3	A	4	Slovakia	Gabriela Gajanová	1:59.92		14
4	A	7	Lithuania	Gabija Galvydytė	2:00.29	PB	13
5	A	8	Romania	Claudia Mihaela Bobocea	2:01.19	PB	12
6	A	3	Denmark	Annemarie Nissen	2:01.23	SB	11
7	A	9	Slovenia	Jerneja Smonkar	2:01.79	PB	10
8	A	2	Iceland	Aníta Hinriksdóttir	2:03.33	SB	9
9	B	4	Croatia	Nina Vuković	2:05.53		8
10	B	8	Bulgaria	Lilyana Georgieva	2:05.98	SB	7
11	B	7	Estonia	Helin Meier	2:06.00	SB	6
12	B	6	Serbia	Marija Stambolić	2:07.82	SB	5
13	B	9	Luxembourg	Charline Mathias	2:08.73	SB	4
14	B	5	Latvia	Līga Velvere	2:10.80		3
15	B	3	Moldova	Mihaela Botnari	2:18.79	SB	2
16	B	2	Cyprus	Anastasia Papadovasilaki	2:20.08		1
WR: (Czechoslovakia) Jarmila Kratochvílová - 1:53.28; ER: (Czechoslovakia) Jarmila Kratochvílová - 1:53.28 EL: (United Kingdom) Keely Hodgkinson - 1:55.77; CR: (Ukraine) Yuliya Krevsun - 1:58.62

=== 1500 metres ===
Rank	Nation	Athlete	Result	Notes	Match points
1	Romania	Claudia Mihaela Bobocea	4:08.68		16
2	Luxembourg	Vera Hoffmann	4:08.78		15
3	Lithuania	Gabija Galvydytė	4:09.48	PB	14
4	Ukraine	Olha Lyakhova	4:10.99	PB	13
5	Denmark	Sofia Thøgersen	4:11.08	EU20L	12
6	Hungary	Lili Anna Vindics-Tóth	4:11.87	PB	11
7	Slovenia	Veronika Sadek	4:14.59	PB	10
8	Croatia	Klara Andrijašević	4:17.91	PB	9
9	Slovakia	Žofia Naňová	4:20.95	PB	8
10	Estonia	Helin Meier	4:25.24	PB	7
11	Cyprus	Natalia Evangelidou	4:27.74		6
12	Bulgaria	Devora Avramova	4:28.91	SB	5
13	Serbia	Saima Murić	4:29.35		4
14	Moldova	Mihaela Botnari	4:36.97	PB	3
15	Iceland	Elín Sóley Sigurbjörnsdóttir	4:38.43	PB	2
16	Latvia	Līga Velvere	5:06.25		1
WR: (Kenya) Faith Kipyegon - 3:49.118; ER: (Netherlands) Sifan Hassan - 3:51.95 EL: (United Kingdom) Laura Muir - 3:57.09; CR: (Ukraine) Anna Mishchenko - 4:05.32

=== 5000 metres ===
Rank	Nation	Athlete	Result	Notes	Match points
1	Latvia	Agate Caune	15:15.21		16
2	Slovenia	Klara Lukan	15:33.39		15
3	Hungary	Viktória Wagner-Gyürkés	15:34.70		14
4	Ukraine	Valeriia Zinenko	15:36.98	PB	13
5	Croatia	Bojana Bjeljac	15:44.57		12
6	Denmark	Nanna Bové	15:45.21		11
7	Bulgaria	Militsa Mircheva	15:47.58	SB	10
8	Slovakia	Žofia Naňova	16:31.19	PB	9
9	Iceland	Andrea Kolbeinsdóttir	16:32.42	PB	8
10	Romania	Madalina-Elena Sirbu	16:33.24	PB	7
11	Moldova	Lilia Fisikovici	16:50.96	SB	6
12	Lithuania	Lina Kiriliuk	17:12.49	SB	5
13	Estonia	Jekaterina Patjuk	17:12.75	SB	4
14	Luxembourg	Saskia Daguenet	17:52.09	SB	3
15	Cyprus	Eleni Ioannou	18:08.28	PB	2
16	Serbia	Mejra Mehmedović	18:15.32	SB	1
WR: (Kenya) Faith Kipyegon - 14:05.20; ER: (Netherlands) Sifan Hassan - 14:22.12 EL: (United Kingdom) Laura Muir - 14:48.14; CR: (Turkey) Elvan Abeylegesse - 15:09.31

=== 3000 metres steeplechase ===
Rank	Nation	Athlete	Result	Notes	Match points
1	Slovenia	Maruša Mišmaš Zrimšek	9:23.41		16
2	Lithuania	Greta Karinauskaitė	9:28.48		15
3	Denmark	Juliane Hvid	9:36.98	PB	14
4	Ukraine	Nataliya Strebkova	10:00.07		13
5	Moldova	Andreea Stavila	10:02.03	PB	12
6	Estonia	Laura Maasik	10:05.91		11
7	Iceland	Andrea Kolbeinsdóttir	10:08.85	NR	10
8	Latvia	Evelīna Krista Sitnika	10:28.25	PB	9
9	Slovakia	Lucia Keszeghová	10:48.83	PB	8
10	Serbia	Milica Tomašević	10:50.25	PB	7
11	Bulgaria	Lilyana Georgieva	10:55.13		6
12	Cyprus	Chrystalla Chadjipolydorou	10:58.32	SB	5
13	Luxembourg	Jenny Gloden	11:06.34	PB	4
14	Croatia	Viva Kovač	11:07.41		3
-	Hungary	Zita Urbán	DNF		-
-	Romania	Elena Adelina Panaet	DNF		-
WR: (Kenya) Beatrice Chepkoech - 8:44.32; ER: (Russia) G Samitova-Galkina - 8:58.81 EL: (France) Alice Finot - 9:10.04; CR: (Albania) Luiza Gega - 9:17.31

=== 100 metres hurdles ===
Rank	Heat	Lane	Nation	Athlete	Result	Notes	Match points
1	A	5	Hungary	Luca Kozák	12.89	SB	16
2	A	4	Denmark	Mette Graversgaard	12.95		15
3	A	6	Cyprus	Natalia Christofi	13.05		14
4	A	8	Slovakia	Stanislava Škvarková	13.13		13
5	A	3	Ukraine	Anna Plotitsyna	13.18		12
6	A	2	Serbia	Milica Emini	13.28		11
7	A	7	Slovenia	Nika Glojnarič	13.29		10
8	B	4	Romania	Anamaria Nesteriuc	13.30 (.292)		9
9	A	9	Estonia	Diana Suumann	13.30 (.296)		8
10	B	6	Croatia	Ivana Lončarek	13.45		7
11	B	5	Luxembourg	Victoria Rausch	13.51		6
12	B	7	Latvia	Kristīne Blaževiča	13.76		5
13	B	8	Bulgaria	Nikol Andonova	13.93		4
14	B	3	Lithuania	Gabija Klimukaitė	14.10		3
15	B	9	Moldova	Ivana Garaeva	14.28	PB	2
16	B	2	Iceland	Birna Kristín Kristjánsdóttir	14.71		1
Wind A: +0.6 m/s B: -1.5 m/s		WR: (Nigeria) Tobi Amusan - 12.12; ER: (Bulgaria) Yordanka Donkova - 12.21 EL: (Czech Republic) Reetta Hurske - 12.70; CR: (Belarus) Elvira Herman - 12.62					

=== 400 metres hurdles ===
Rank	Heat	Lane	Nation	Athlete	Result	Notes	Match points
1	A	5	Ukraine	Viktoriya Tkachuk	55.87		16
2	A	6	Slovenia	Agata Zupin	56.58		15
3	A	7	Hungary	Janka Molnár	56.86		14
4	A	4	Slovakia	Daniela Ledecká	57.83	SB	13
5	A	8	Denmark	Martha Rasmussen	58.17		12
6	B	7	Bulgaria	Kristina Borukova	58.98		11
7	B	6	Cyprus	Kalypso Stavrou	59.61	PB	10
8	B	2	Moldova	Anna Berghii	1:00.46	SB	9
9	B	5	Croatia	Natalija Švenda	1:00.87		8
10	B	4	Lithuania	Ema Sarafinaitė	1:01.37	SB	7
11	A	2	Serbia	Dragana Macanović	1:01.51		6
12	B	3	Luxembourg	Charline Lefevre	1:02.11	PB	5
13	B	9	Latvia	Kitija Zaula	1:02.15		4
14	B	8	Iceland	Ingibjörg Sigurðardóttir	1:02.27		3
15	A	3	Romania	Sanda Belgyan	1:04.09		2
-	A	9	Estonia	Marielle Kleemeier	DQ	TR 22.6.2	-
WR: (United States) Sydney McLaughlin - 50.68; ER: (Netherlands) Femke Bol - 52.03 EL: (Netherlands) Femke Bol - 52.30; CR: (Bulgaria) Vania Stambolova - 53.70

=== High jump ===
Rank	Nation	Athlete	Result	Notes	Match points
1	Ukraine	Yaroslava Mahuchikh	1.97		16
2	Romania	Daniela Stanciu	1.94		15
3	Serbia	Angelina Topić	1.91		14
4	Lithuania	Airinė Palšytė	1.91	SB	13
5	Cyprus	Elena Kulichenko	1.91		12
6	Slovenia	Lia Apostolovski	1.84		11
7	Hungary	Fédra Fekete	1.84		10
8	Estonia	Elisabeth Pihela	1.84		9
9	Croatia	Sara Aščić	1.79		8
10	Denmark	Kathrine Fjerbæk Olsen	1.79	SB	7
11	Latvia	Patrīcija Jansone	1.79		6
12	Bulgaria	Iren Sarâboyukova	1.73		4.50
12	Iceland	Eva Maria Baldursdóttir	1.73		4.50
14	Slovakia	Terézia Vaneková	1.73	PB	3
15	Luxembourg	Mia Bourscheid	1.61		2
16	Moldova	Ana Bulat	1.61	SB	1
WR: (Bulgaria) Stefka Kostadinova - 2.09; ER: (Bulgaria) Stefka Kostadinova - 2.09 EL: (Ukraine) Yaroslava Mahuchikh - 2.01; CR: (Croatia) Blanka Vlašić - 2.04

=== Pole vault ===
Rank	Nation	Athlete	Result	Notes	Entry PB
1	Slovenia	Tina Šutej	4.70		16
2	Hungary	Hanga Klekner	4.45	PB	15
3	Denmark	Caroline Bonde Holm	4.35		14
4	Ukraine	Yana Hladiychuk	4.15		13
5	Croatia	Lara Juriša	3.80		12
6	Latvia	Paula Kļaviņa	3.80	PB	11
7	Bulgaria	Mariya Kapusheva	3.65	PB	10
8	Cyprus	Andrea Vasou	3.65	SB	9
9	Iceland	Karen Sif Ársælsdóttir	3.45		8
10	Romania	Andreea Stefania Dragan	3.25		7
11	Slovakia	Júlia Havjerová	3.05		6
12	Serbia	Olivera Kanazir	3.05	SB	5
-	Estonia	Marleen Mülla	NM		-
-	Luxembourg	Sofia Vavakou	NM		-
-	Lithuania	Rugilė Miklyčiūtė	NM		-
WR: (Russia) Yelena Isinbayeva - 5.06; ER: (Russia) Yelena Isinbayeva - 5.06 EL: (Slovenia) Tina Šutej - 4.76; CR: (Poland) Anna Rogowska - 4.75

- DNE : Moldova

=== Long jump ===
Rank	Nation	Athlete	Result	Notes	Match points
1	Serbia	Milica Gardašević	6.82		16
2	Romania	Alina Rotaru-Kottmann	6.63		15
3	Lithuania	Jogaile Petrokaitė	6.60	SB	14
4	Hungary	Diana Lesti	6.48		13
5	Bulgaria	Plamena Mitkova	6.42		12
6	Cyprus	Filippa Kviten	6.34		11
7	Latvia	Kristīne Blaževiča	6.14		10
8	Slovakia	Monika Lehenová	6.10		9
9	Iceland	Irma Gunnarsdóttir	6.03		8
10	Slovenia	Urša Matotek	6.01		7
11	Croatia	Klara Barnjak	5.97		6
12	Estonia	Kreete Verlin	5.94	SB	5
13	Denmark	Annette Nielsen	5.83		4
14	Moldova	Anastasia Senchiv	5.67	SB	3
15	Luxembourg	Soraya de Sousa Moreira	5.43		2
-	Ukraine	Maryna Bekh-Romanchuk	NM		-
WR: (Soviet Union) Galina Chistyakova - 7.52; ER: (Soviet Union) Galina Chistyakova - 7.52 EL: (United Kingdom) Jazmin Sawyers - 7.00i CR: (Russia) Darya Klishina - 6.95

=== Triple jump ===
Rank	Nation	Athlete	Result	Notes	Match points
1	Ukraine	Maryna Bekh-Romanchuk	14.58		16
2	Latvia	Rūta Kate Lasmane	13.86		15
3	Bulgaria	Aleksandra Nacheva	13.67	SB	14
4	Lithuania	Aina Grikšaitė	13.53		13
5	Romania	Diana Ana Maria Ion	13.44		12
6	Croatia	Paola Borović	13.42	SB	11
7	Slovenia	Neja Filipič	13.35		10
8	Moldova	Anastasia Senchiv	12.99	SB	9
9	Hungary	Beatrix Szabó	12.76		8
10	Iceland	Irma Gunnarsdóttir	12.69		7
11	Slovakia	Zuzana Ďurkechová	12.62		6
12	Denmark	Janne Nielsen	12.54		5
13	Estonia	Daria O'Konnel-Bronin	12.48		4
14	Cyprus	Nikoleta Chrystanthou	11.60		3
-	Serbia	Teodora Boberić	NM		-
WR: (Venezuela) Yulimar Rojas - 15.74; ER: (Ukraine) Inessa Kravets - 15.50 EL: (Ukraine) Maryna Bekh-Romanchuk - 14.75; CR: (Russia) Yekaterina Koneva - 14.87

- DNE : Luxembourg

=== Shot put ===
Rank	Nation	Athlete	Result	Notes	Match Points
1	Hungary	Anita Márton	17.74		16
2	Moldova	Dimitriana Bezede	17.27		15
3	Iceland	Erna Sóley Gunnarsdóttir	16.93		14
4	Latvia	Anna Gulbe	15.42	PB	13
5	Lithuania	Urte Bačianskaitė	14.81		12
6	Estonia	Kätlin Piirimäe	14.53		11
7	Denmark	Thea Jensen	14.46		10
8	Cyprus	Paraskeovulla Thrasyvoulou	14.39		9
9	Bulgaria	Mikhaela Petkova	13.89		8
10	Croatia	Lucija Leko	13.74		7
11	Serbia	Mirjana Dasović	13.64		6
12	Slovenia	Veronika Domjan	13.60	SB	5
13	Ukraine	Mariya Larina	13.30		4
14	Slovakia	Monika Marjová	13.19		3
15	Luxembourg	Stéphanie Krumlovsky	13.09		2
16	Romania	Ioana Diana Țigănașu	12.89		1
WR: (Soviet Union) Natalya Lisovskaya - 22.63; ER: (Soviet Union) Natalya Lisovskaya - 22.63 EL: (Portugal) Auriol Dongmo - 19.72; CR: (Germany) Christina Schwanitz - 19.82

=== Discus throw ===
Rank	Nation	Athlete	Result	Notes	Matchpoints
1	Denmark	Lisa Brix Pedersen	59.20		16
2	Lithuania	Ieva Zarankaitė	57.71		15
3	Croatia	Marija Tolj	57.06		14
4	Slovenia	Veronika Domjan	55.73		13
5	Hungary	Dóra Kerekes	54.10		12
6	Cyprus	Androniki Lada	52.52		11
7	Serbia	Milica Poznanović	52.39	PB	10
8	Romania	Andreea Iuliana Lungu	50.54		9
9	Ukraine	Daria Kozachok	48.61	PB	8
10	Estonia	Hanna-Maria Kupper	48.57	SB	7
11	Moldova	Dimitriana Bezede	47.41		6
12	Iceland	Hera Christensen	45.69		5
13	Slovakia	Barbora Jakubcová	44.71		4
14	Bulgaria	Renata Todorova	42.85		3
15	Latvia	Vineta Krūmiņa	41.39		2
16	Luxembourg	Stéphanie Krumlovsky	36.61		1
WR: (East Germany) Gabriele Reinsch - 76.80; ER: (East Germany) Gabriele Reinsch - 76.80 EL: (Netherlands) Jorinde van Klinken - 67.05; CR: (Croatia) Sandra Perković - 68.58

=== Hammer throw ===
Rank	Nation	Athlete	Result	Notes	Match points
1	Romania	Bianca Florentina Ghelber	72.97		16
2	Hungary	Réka Gyurátz	67.15		15
3	Denmark	Katrine Koch Jacobsen	67.10		14
4	Moldova	Zalina Marghieva	65.86		13
5	Slovakia	Veronika Kaňuchová	65.54		12
6	Cyprus	Valentina Savva	65.47	WU20L	11
7	Estonia	Anna Maria Orel	63.52		10
8	Ukraine	Valeriia Ivanenko-Kyrylina	61.19		9
9	Lithuania	Agne Lukoševičiūtė	60.73		8
10	Iceland	Guðrún Karítas Hallgrímsdóttir	58.49		7
11	Serbia	Aleksandra Ivanović	58.08		6
12	Croatia	Ludija Pendić	55.98		5
13	Slovenia	Esma Pajt	51.07		4
14	Luxembourg	Isabeau Pleimling	48.28		3
15	Bulgaria	Ekaterina Dimova	42.12	SB	2
16	Latvia	Rebeka Ozolniece	23.23	SB	1
WR: (Poland) Anita Włodarczyk - 82.98; ER: (Poland) Anita Włodarczyk - 82.98 EL: (Finland) Silja Kosonen - 73.78; CR: (Poland) Anita Włodarczyk - 78.28

=== Javelin throw ===
Rank	Nation	Athlete	Result	Notes	Match points
1	Latvia	Līna Mūze	62.38		16
2	Estonia	Gedly Tugi	60.19	PB	15
3	Croatia	Sara Kolak	59.62	SB	14
4	Serbia	Adriana Vilagoš	58.93		13
5	Hungary	Angéla Moravcsik	58.51		12
6	Lithuania	Liveta Jasiūnaitė	57.46		11
7	Slovenia	Martina Ratej	56.14		10
8	Ukraine	Hanna Hatsko	54.49		9
9	Iceland	Arndís Diljá Óskarsdóttir	48.57	PB	8
10	Slovakia	Petra Hanuliaková	46.92		7
11	Luxembourg	Noémie Pleimling	46.60		6
12	Romania	Ioana Valentina Baciu	46.15		5
13	Bulgaria	Mikhaela Petkova	44.75		4
14	Denmark	Liv Cantby	44.14		3
15	Cyprus	Christiana Ellina	40.51		2
16	Moldova	Ana-Maria Eremeia	36.09	SB	1
WR: (Czech Republic) Barbora Špotáková - 72.28; ER: (Czech Republic) Barbora Špotáková - 72.28 EL: (Norway) Sigrid Borge - 66.50; CR: (Germany) Christin Hussong - 69.19

=== 4 x 100 metres relay ===
Rank	Heat	Lane	Nation	Members	Result	Notes	Match points
1	A	8	Hungary	Gréta Kerekes; Jusztina Csóti; Boglárka Takács; Alexa Sulyán	43.49	=NR	16
2	A	7	Denmark	Mathilde U. Kramer; Mette Graversgaard; Emma Beiter Bomme; Klara Skriver Loessl	43.89	SB	15
3	A	9	Lithuania	Andre Ožechauskaitė; Modesta Juste Morauskaitė; Eva Misiūnaitė; Lukrecija Sabaitytė	44.06	SB	14
4	Rerun	5	Estonia	Miia Ott; Diana Suumann; Kreete Verlin; Ann Marii Kivikas	44.21	NR	13
5	B	8	Cyprus	Dafni Georgiou; Marianna Pisiara; Filippa Kviten; Olivia Fotopoulou	44.63	SB	12
6	B	6	Slovakia	Viktória Forster; Agáta Cellerová; Stanislava ŠKvarková; Monika Weigertová	44.69	SB	11
7	A	4	Slovenia	Joni Romičič Prezelj; Kaja Debevec; Lucija Potnik; Lina Hribar	45.27	SB	10
8	A	5	Bulgaria	Nikol Andonova; Kristen Radukanova; Martina Pisacheva; Radina Velichkova	45.32	SB	9
9	A	2	Croatia	Melani Bosić; Margareta Risek; Mia Wild; Vita Penezić	45.48	SB	8
10	B	2	Iceland	Birna Kristín Kristjánsdóttir; Júlia Kristín Jóhannesdóttir; Eir Hlesdottir; Duðbjörg Jóna Bjarnadóttir	46.69	SB	7
11	B	3	Moldova	Anna Berghii; Tatiana Contrebuț; Iana Garaeva; Diana Podoleanu	47.60	SB	6
-	A	3	Romania	Marina Andreea Baboi; Maria Valeria Bisericescu; Anamaria Nesteriuc; Emma Maria Adnana Matyus	DNF		-
-	A	6	Ukraine	Olena Raduik-Kucuk; Diana Honcharenko; Yana Kachur; Tetiana Kaisen	DNF		-
-	B	4	Luxembourg	Victoria Rausch; Sandrine Rossi; Laurence Jones; Soraya de Sousa Moreira	DQ	TR 17.2.2	-
-	B	7	Serbia	Tamara Milutinović; Ivana Ilić; Katarina Vreta; Milana Tirnanić	DQ	TR 24.7	-
-	B	9	Latvia	Līga Vecbērza; Jelizaveta Romanenko; Elizabete Kociņa; Sindija Bukša	DQ	TR 24.7	-
WR: United States - 40.82; ER: East Germany - 41.37 EL: Spain - 42.99; CR: Germany - 42.47

== Mixed event ==
=== 4 x 400 metres relay ===
Rank	Heat	Lane	Nation	Members	Result	Notes	Match points
1	A	7	Slovenia	Lovro Mesec Košir; Agata Zupin; Rok Ferlan; Anita Horvat	3:14.72	WL	16
2	A	5	Romania	Mihai Sorin Dringo; Elena Mirela Lavric; Robert Parge; Andrea Miklós	3:14.83	SB	15
3	A	8	Ukraine	Mykyta Barabanov; Kateryna Karpiuk; Oleksandr Pohorilko; Anna Ryzhykova	3:15.13	SB	14
4	A	9	Lithuania	Lukas Sutkus; Ema Sarafinaitė; Tomas Keršulis; Modesta Juste Morauskaitė	3:15.95	SB	13
5	A	6	Hungary	Árpád Kovács; Fanni Rapai; Zoltán Wahl; Virág Simon	3:17.42	SB	12
6	B	7	Estonia	Lukas Lessel; Viola Hambidge; Rasmus Mägi; Marielle Kleemeier	3:19.47	NR	11
7	B	8	Slovakia	Patrik Dömötör; Gabriela Gajanová; Šimon Bujna; Alexandra Bezeková	3:19.84	SB	10
8	A	3	Croatia	Marko Orešković; Nina Vuković; Jakov Vuković; Veronika Drljačić	3:20.24	EU23L	9
9	B	5	Serbia	Nikola Kostić; Aleksandra Pešić; Ivan Marković; Maja Ćirić	3:21.27	SB	8
10	B	9	Bulgaria	Yordan Gyurov; Andrea Savova; Todor Todorov; Deva-Mariya Dragieva	3:22.58	SB	7
11	A	2	Latvia	Ilja Petrušenko; Katrīna Kamarūte; Artūrs Pastors; Gunta Vaičule	3:22.71	SB	6
12	A	4	Denmark	Joel von de Ahé; Anne Sofie Kirkegaard; Gustav Lundholm Nielsen; Anna Øbakke Lange	3:24.90	SB	5
13	B	6	Cyprus	Paisios Dimitriadis; Rafaela Demetriou; Stavros Spyrou; Kalliopi Kountouri	3:26.00	SB	4
14	B	2	Luxembourg	Olivier Juncker; Fanny Arendt; Philippe Hilger; Charline Mathias	3:29.34	SB	3
15	B	3	Moldova	Ivan Galușco; Anna Berghii; Cristin Eșanu; Tatiana Contrebuț	3:29.66	SB	2
16	B	4	Iceland	Kolbeinn Höður Gunnarsson; Eir Hlesdottir; Samundur Ólafsson; Ingibjörg Sigurðardóttir	3:29.99	SB	1
WR: United States - 3:09.34; ER: Poland - 3:09.87 EL: Belgium - 3:26.24; CR: no record
