= 2017 Icelandic Athletics Championships =

- Dates: 8–9 July
- Host city: Selfoss, Iceland
- Venue: Selfossvöllur

The 2017 Icelandic Athletics Championships (Icelandic: Meistaramót Íslands í frjálsum íþróttum 2017) was the 91st edition of the national outdoor track and field championships for Iceland. It was held from 8–9 July at Selfossvöllur in Selfoss. It served as the selection meeting for Iceland at the 2017 World Championships in Athletics.

== Results ==
=== Men ===
| Event | Gold | | Silver | | Bronze | |
|---|---|---|---|---|---|---|
| 100 metres | Kolbeinn Höður Gunnarsson | 10.89 | Ari Bragi Kárason | 10.89 | Juan Ramon Borges Bosque | 11.20 |
| 200 metres (Wind: -2.6 m/s) | Ari Bragi Kárason | 21.48 | Kormákur Ari Hafliðason | 22.34 | Juan Ramon Borges Bosque | 22.46 |
| 400 metres | Kormákur Ari Hafliðason | 48.87 | Ívar Kristinn Jasonarson | 49.11 | Hinrik Snær Steinsson | 50.35 |
| 800 metres | Kristinn Þór Kristinsson | 1:54.68 | Trausti Þór Þorsteins | 1:56.26 | Sæmundur Ólafsson | 1:56.27 |
| 1500 metres | Kristinn Þór Kristinsson | 4:00.40 | Sæmundur Ólafsson | 4:07.17 | Hugi Harðarson | 4:09.29 |
| 5000 metres | Arnar Pétursson | 15:27.91 | Vilhjálmur Þór Svansson | 16:51.56 | Andri Már Hannesson | 16:56.56 |
| 3000 m s'chase | Arnar Pétursson | 9:43.73 | Ástþór Jón Tryggvason | 10:37.26 | Kjartan Óli Ágústsson | 11:53.78 |
| 110 m hurdles | Ísak Óli Traustason | 15.26 | Árni Björn Höskuldsson | 15.64 | Kormákur Ari Hafliðason | 16.15 |
| 400 m hurdles | Ívar Kristinn Jasonarson | 53.30 | Matthías Már Heiðarsson | 58.81 | Árni Haukur Árnason | 1:00.43 |
| High jump | Bjarki Rúnar Kristinsson | 1.90 m | Markús Ingi Hauksson | 1.87 m | Bjarki Viðar Kristjánsson | 1.82 m |
| Pole vault | Ingi Rúnar Kristinsson | 4.42 m | Leó Gunnar Víðisson | 4.32 m | Ari Sigþór Eiríksson | 4.02 m |
| Long jump | Kristinn Torfason | 7.18 m (+0.2 m/s) | Gylfi Ingvar Gylfason | 6.57 m (+1.3 m/s) | Guðmundur Smári Daníelsson | 6.53 m (+1.2 m/s) |
| Triple jump | Kristinn Torfason | 14.40 m (+3.0 m/s) | Bjarki Rúnar Kristinsson | 13.97 m (+1.3 m/s) | Guðmundur Smári Daníelsson | 13.33 m (+2.8 m/s) |
| Shot put | Óðinn Björn Þorsteinsson | 16.22 m | Sindri Lárusson | 15.81 m | Kristján Viktor Kristinsson | 15.21 m |
| Discus throw | Guðni Valur Guðnason | 58.11 m | Hákon Ingi Haraldsson | 44.92 m | Sindri Hrafn Guðmundsson | 43.56 m |
| Hammer throw | Hilmar Örn Jónsson | 69.16 m | Vilhjálmur Árni Garðarsson | 54.32 m | Jón Bjarni Bragason | 47.43 m |
| Javelin throw | Dagbjartur Daði Jónsson | 68.97 m | Örn Davíðsson | 68.19 m | Guðmundur Hólmar Jónsson | 61.66 m |
| 4 × 100 m relay | Sveit FH; Dagur Andri Einarsson; Kolbeinn Höður Gunnarsson; Ari Bragi Kárason; Kristófer Þorgrímsson | 41.15 | Sveit Breiðabliks; Gylfi Ingvar Gylfason; Juan Ramon Borges Bosque; Björgvin Brynjarsson; Ingi Rúnar Kristinsson | 42.54 | B-sveit FH; Ingþór Ingason; Guðmundur Heiðar Guðmundsson; Arnaldur Þór Guðmundsson; Kormákur Ari Hafliðason | 43.52 |
| 4 × 400 m relay | Sveit FH; Arnaldur Þór Guðmundsson; Hinrik Snær Steinsson; Guðmundur Heiðar Guðmundsson; Kormákur Ari Hafliðason | 3:26.25 | Sveit Fjölnis; Einar Már Óskarsson; Matthías Már Heiðarsson; Daði Arnarson; Bjarni Anton Theódórsson | 3:30.50 | Sveit ÍR; Jón Gunnar Björnsson; Þorkell Stefánsson; Árni Haukur Árnason; Ívar Kristinn Jasonarson | 3:31.28 |

=== Women ===
| Event | Gold | | Silver | | Bronze | |
|---|---|---|---|---|---|---|
| 100 metres | Tiana Ósk Whitworth | 12.02 | Arna Stefanía Guðmundsdóttir | 12.04 | Guðbjörg Jóna Bjarnadóttir | 12.30 |
| 200 metres | Guðbjörg Jóna Bjarnadóttir | 24.68 | Tiana Ósk Whitworth | 24.75 | Andrea Torfadóttir | 25.62 |
| 400 metres | Vilhelmína Þór Óskarsdóttir | 59.25 | Sara Hlín Jóhannsdóttir | 1:00.75 | Ingibjörg Sigurðardóttir | 1:01.48 |
| 1500 metres | Andrea Kolbeinsdóttir | 4:54.87 | Iðunn Björg Arnaldsdóttir | 4:57.87 | Helga Guðný Elíasdóttir | 4:59.44 |
| 3000 metres | Andrea Kolbeinsdóttir | 10:37.32 | Helga Guðný Elíasdóttir | 10:47.02 | Lára Björk Pétursdóttir | 11:58.28 |
| 100 m hurdles | Arna Stefanía Guðmundsdóttir | 14.13 | María Rún Gunnlaugsdóttir | 14.95 | Irma Gunnarsdóttir | 15.25 |
| 400 m hurdles | Sara Hlín Jóhannsdóttir | 1:06.63 | Only one entrant | | | |
| High jump | Þóranna Ósk Sigurjónsdóttir | 1.72 m | Kristín Lív Svabo Jónsdóttir | 1.72 m | María Rún Gunnlaugsdóttir | 1.66 m |
| Pole vault | Karen Sif Ársælsdóttir | 2.92 m | Stella Dögg Eiríksdóttir Blöndal | 2.82 m | Guðrún Lilja Friðjónsdóttir | 2.82 m |
| Long jump | Guðrún Heiða Bjarnadóttir | 5.78 m (+0.9 m/s) | Irma Gunnarsdóttir | 5.65 m (+2.2 m/s) | Hildigunnur Þórarinsdóttir | 5.62 m (+0.0 m/s) |
| Triple jump | Hildigunnur Þórarinsdóttir | 11.62 m (-1.0 m/s) | Agla María Kristjánsdóttir | 11.02 m (-2.9 m/s) | Harpa Svansdóttir | 10.98 m (-1.0 m/s) |
| Shot put | Ásdís Hjálmsdóttir | 14.88 m | Erna Sóley Gunnarsdóttir | 13.45 m | Thelma Lind Kristjánsdóttir | 12.96 m |
| Discus throw | Ásdís Hjálmsdóttir | 47.65 m | Thelma Lind Kristjánsdóttir | 45.56 m | Kristín Karlsdóttir | 42.42 m |
| Hammer throw | Vigdís Jónsdóttir | 55.67 m | Rut Tryggvadóttir | 48.94 m | Guðný Sigurðardóttir | 43.81 m |
| Javelin throw | Ásdís Hjálmsdóttir | 56.75 m | Irma Gunnarsdóttir | 42.66 m | María Rún Gunnlaugsdóttir | 41.80 m |
| 4 × 100 m relay | Sveit ÍR; Tiana Ósk Whitworth; Katrín Steinunn Antonsdóttir; Helga Margrét Haraldsdóttir; Guðbjörg Jóna Bjarnadóttir | 46.42 | Sveit FH; María Rún Gunnlaugsdóttir; Dóróthea Jóhannesdóttir; Andrea Torfadóttir; Arna Stefanía Guðmundsdóttir | 47.34 | Sveit Breiðabliks; Birna Kristín Kristjánsdóttir; Sara Hlín Jóhannsdóttir; Agla María Kristjánsdóttir; Irma Gunnarsdóttir | 50.52 |
| 4 × 400 m relay | Sveit ÍR; Helga Margrét Haraldsdóttir; Ingibjörg Sigurðardóttir; Iðunn Björg Arnaldsdóttir; Guðbjörg Jóna Bjarnadóttir | 4:05.32 | Sveit Breiðabliks; Snædís Ólafsdóttir; Sara Hlín Jóhannsdóttir; Kolfinna Ýr Karelsdóttir; Agla María Kristjánsdóttir | 4:15.18 | Sveit Fjölnis; Elísa Sverrisdóttir; Birta Karen Tryggvadóttir; Helga Guðný Elíasdóttir; Vilhelmína Þór Óskarsdóttir | 4:20.68 |

== See also ==
- 2017 Icelandic Indoor Athletics Championships
