= 2017 Icelandic Indoor Athletics Championships =

- Dates: 18–19 February
- Host city: Reykjavík, Iceland
- Venue: Laugardalshöll
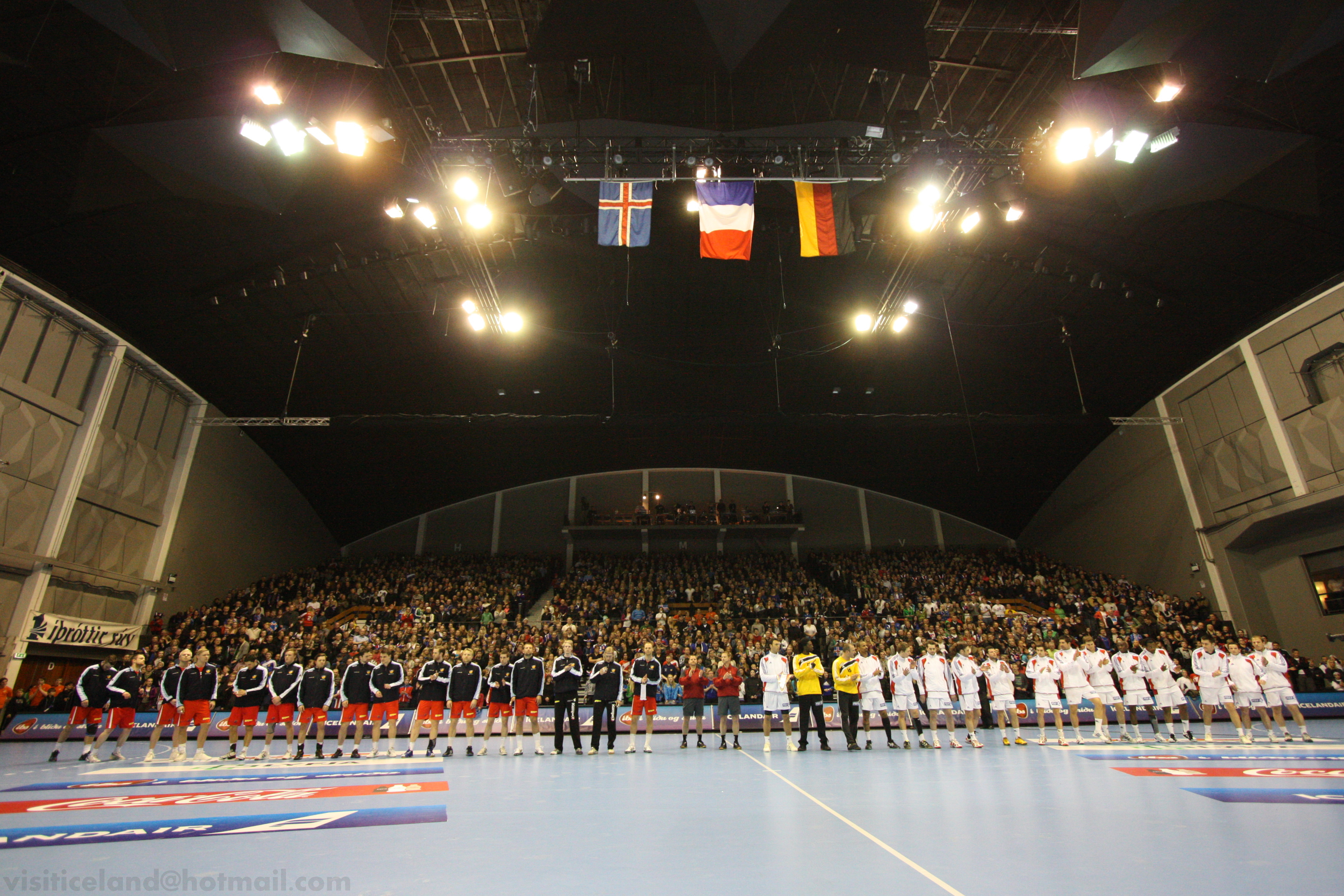
- Events: 26

The 2017 Icelandic Indoor Athletics Championships (Icelandic: Meistaramót Íslands innanhúss í frjálsum íþróttum 2017) was the year's national indoor track and field championships for Iceland. It was held from 18–19 February at Laugardalshöll in Reykjavík. A total of 26 national championship events (divided evenly between the sexes) were held. It served as the selection meeting for Iceland at the 2017 European Athletics Indoor Championships.

== Results ==
=== Men ===
Event	Gold		Silver		Bronze	
60 metres	Ari Bragi Kárason	7.00	Björgvin Brynjarsson	7.07	Juan Ramon Borges Bosque	7.11
200 metres	Ívar Kristinn Jasonarson	22.08	Guðmundur Ágúst Thoroddsen	22.52	Gunnar Eyjólfsson	22.90
400 metres	Ívar Kristinn Jasonarson	48.79	Bjarni Anton Theódórsson	49.74	Guðmundur Ágúst Thoroddsen	50.74
800 metres	Bjartmar Örnuson	1:56.16	Trausti Þór Þorsteins	1:57.28	Daði Arnarson	1:57.37
1500 metres	Bjartmar Örnuson	4:00.75	Arnar Pétursson	4:04.90	Birkir Einar Gunnlaugsson	4:07.19
3000 metres	Arnar Pétursson	8:51.63	Birkir Einar Gunnlaugsson	9:16.06	Þórólfur Ingi Þórsson	9:18.73
60 m hurdles	Ísak Óli Traustason	8.50	Ingi Rúnar Kristinsson	8.52	Guðmundur Karl Úlfarsson	8.84
High jump	Bjarki Rúnar Kristinsson	1.91	Örn Davíðsson	1.88	Bjarki Viðar Kristjánsson	1.85
Pole vault	Bjarki Gíslason	4.83	Krister Blær Jónsson	4.83	Guðmundur Karl Úlfarsson	4.63
Long jump	Þorsteinn Ingvarsson	7.47	Kristinn Torfason	7.39	Ísak Óli Traustason	7.13
Triple jump	Kristinn Torfason	13.84	Haraldur Einarsson	13.28	Birgir Jóhannes Jónsson	12.78
Shot put	Guðni Valur Guðnason	16.98	Sindri Lárusson	15.91	Ingi Rúnar Kristinsson	14.11
4 × 200 m relay	Sveit ÍR; Þorsteinn Ingvarsson; Helgi Björnsson; Kolbeinn Tómas Jónsson; Ívar Kristinn Jasonarson	1:30.48	Sveit Breiðabliks; Sindri Magnússon; Ingi Rúnar Kristinsson; Bjarki Rúnar Kristinsson; Arnór Gunnarsson	1:31.46	Sveit Fjölnis; Matthías Már Heiðarsson; Einar Már Óskarsson; Daði Arnarson; Bjarni Anton Theódórsson	1:39.83

=== Women ===
Event	Gold		Silver		Bronze	
60 metres	Birna Kristín Kristjánsdóttir	7.88	Andrea Torfadóttir	7.88	María Rún Gunnlaugsdóttir	7.92
200 metres	Tiana Ósk Whitworth	24.97	Vilhelmína Þór Óskarsdóttir	26.36	Sara Hlín Jóhannsdóttir	26.64
400 metres	Vilhelmína Þór Óskarsdóttir	58.61	Ingibjörg Sigurðardóttir	59.99	Sara Hlín Jóhannsdóttir	1:00.04
800 metres	Hrafnhild Eir R. Hermóðsdóttir	2:22.72	Ingibjörg Sigurðardóttir	2:23.08	Dagbjört Lilja Magnúsdóttir	2:27.49
1500 metres	Andrea Kolbeinsdóttir	4:45.98	Helga Guðný Elíasdóttir	4:49.78	María Birkisdóttir	5:01.05
3000 metres	Andrea Kolbeinsdóttir	10:18.22	Elín Edda Sigurðardóttir	10:38.46	Helga Guðný Elíasdóttir	10:43.56
60 metres	María Rún Gunnlaugsdóttir	8.97	Irma Gunnarsdóttir	9.04	Guðbjörg Bjarkadóttir	9.15
High jump	Þóranna Ósk Sigurjónsdóttir	1.74	María Rún Gunnlaugsdóttir	1.71	Kristín Lív Svabo Jónsdóttir	1.68
Pole vault	Bogey Ragnheiður Leósdóttir	3.33	Auður María Óskarsdóttir	3.23	Thelma Rós Hálfdánardóttir	3.13
Long jump	María Rún Gunnlaugsdóttir	5.80	Irma Gunnarsdóttir	5.68	Guðbjörg Bjarkadóttir	5.46
Triple jump	Helga Margrét Haraldsdóttir	11.46	Dóra Kristný Gunnarsdóttir	10.93	Guðbjörg Bjarkadóttir	10.46
Shot put	Erna Sóley Gunnarsdóttir	13.69	Thelma Lind Kristjánsdóttir	13.36	Irma Gunnarsdóttir	12.73
4 × 200 m relay	Sveit ÍR; Vilborg María Loftsdóttir; Ingibjörg Sigurðardóttir; Helga Margrét Haraldsdóttir; Tiana Ósk Whitworth	1:43.58	Sveit Breiðabliks; Sara Hlín Jóhannsdóttir; Agla María Kristjánsdóttir; Snædís Ólafsdóttir; Irma Gunnarsdóttir	1:46.05	Sveit FH; María Rún Gunnlaugsdóttir; Kolka Magnúsdóttir; Guðbjörg Bjarkadóttir; Rut Sigurðardóttir	1:46.06

== See also ==
- 2017 Icelandic Athletics Championships
