= 2023 European Athletics U23 Championships – Women's heptathlon =

Women's heptathlon at the 2023 European Athletics U23 Championships
- Venue: Leppävaara Stadium
- Location: Espoo, Finland
- Dates: 13-14 July
- Competitors: 21 from 14 nations
- Winning score: 6317

Medalists
gold medal	Saga Vanninen	Finland
silver medal	Sofie Dokter	Netherlands
bronze medal	Pippi Lotta Enok	Estonia

The women's heptathlon event at the 2023 European Athletics U23 Championships was held in Espoo, Finland, at Leppävaara Stadium on 13 and 14 July.

== Records ==
Prior to the competition, the records were as follows:

European U23 record	Carolina Klüft (SWE)	7001	Paris, France	24 August 2003
Championship U23 record	Aiga Grabuste (LAT)	6396	Kaunas, Lithuania	19 July 2009

== Results ==
=== 100 metres hurdles ===
Rank	Heat	Name	Nationality	Time	Points	Notes
1	3	Vilma Itälinna	Finland	13.39	1066	
2	3	Saga Vanninen	Finland	13.50	1050	
3	3	Jodie Smith	Great Britain	13.62	1033	
4	3	Pauline Bikembo	France	13.73	1017	
5	3	Chiara-Belinda Schuler	Austria	13.83	1003	
6	3	Kristïne Blaževiča	Latvia	13.88	995	
7	2	Szabina Szűcs	Hungary	13.90	993	
8	3	Sofie Dokter	Netherlands	13.95	985	
9	2	Pippi Lotta Enok	Estonia	14.05	971	PB
10	2	Noémie Desailly	France	14.15	957	
11	1	Julia Słocka	Poland	14.16	956	
12	1	Elena Debelic	Switzerland	14.22	947	
13	2	Jenna Fee Feyerabend	Germany	14.24	945	
14	2	Katelyn Adel	Switzerland	14.26	942	
15	2	Krista Sprūde	Latvia	14.26	942	
16	2	Edyta Bielska	Poland	14.32	934	
17	1	Neea Käyhkö	Finland	14.36	928	
18	2	Karla Schärfe	Denmark	14.46	914	
19	1	Sophia Mulder	Netherlands	14.66	887	
20	1	Olivija Vaitaitytė	Lithuania	14.73	878	
21	1	Marie Dehning	Germany	14.78	871	
22	1	Anastasia Ntragkomirova	Greece	14.99	843	
	1	Angel Richmore	Sweden	DNF	0	

=== High jump ===
Rnk	Grp	Athlete	Nationality	1.53	1.56	1.59	1.62	1.65	1.68	1.71	1.74	1.77	1.80	1.83	1.86	1.89	1.92	Res	Pts	Nts	Overall	
Rnk	Grp	Athlete	Nationality	1.53	1.56	1.59	1.62	1.65	1.68	1.71	1.74	1.77	1.80	1.83	1.86	1.89	1.92	Res	Pts	Nts	Pts	Rnk
1	B	Sofie Dokter	Netherlands	–	–	–	–	–	–	xo	xo	o	o	xxo	xo	o	xxx	1.89	1093	NU23R	2078	1
2	B	Katelyn Adel	Switzerland	–	–	–	–	o	o	o	o	o	xo	xxx				1.80	978	=PB	1920	3
3	B	Neea Käyhkö	Finland	–	–	–	–	–	o	o	xo	xxo	xxo	xxx				1.80	978	SB	1906	5
4	B	Pippi Lotta Enok	Estonia	–	–	–	o	o	o	o	o	xo	xxx					1.77	941	PB	1912	4
4	B	Saga Vanninen	Finland	–	–	–	–	o	o	o	o	xo	xxx					1.77	941	=PB	1991	2
6	B	Angel Richmore	Sweden	–	–	–	–	–	o	xo	xxo	xo	xxx					1.77	941	=PB	941	23
7	B	Jenna Fee Feyerabend	Germany	–	–	–	–	o	o	xo	xxx							1.71	867		1812	11
8	A	Julia Słocka	Poland	–	–	o	o	xo	xxo	xo	xxx							1.71	867		1823	10
9	A	Szabina Szűcs	Hungary	–	–	o	o	xo	o	xxo	xxx							1.71	867		1860	8
9	B	Kristīne Blaževiča	Latvia	–	–	–	–	o	xo	xxo	xxx							1.71	867		1862	7
11	A	Karla Schärfe	Denmark	–	–	–	o	o	o	xxx								1.68	830		1744	16
12	A	Elena Debelic	Switzerland	–	–	o	o	xo	o	xxx								1.68	830		1777	13
12	B	Edyta Bielska	Poland	–	–	–	o	xo	o	xxx								1.68	830		1764	14
14	B	Pauline Bikembo	France	–	–	–	–	–	xo	xxx								1.68	830		1847	9
15	A	Anastasia Ntragkomirova	Greece	o	o	o	o	xo	xo	xxx								1.68	830		1673	22
16	A	Marie Dehning	Germany	–	–	–	o	o	xxo	xxx								1.68	830	=SB	1701	18
16	B	Jodie Smith	Great Britain	–	–	–	o	o	xxo	xxx								1.68	830		1863	6
18	A	Sophia Mulder	Netherlands	–	–	o	–	o	xxx									1.65	795		1682	19
19	A	Olivija Vaitaitytė	Lithuania	–	–	o	xo	xo	xxx									1.65	795		1673	21
20	A	Krista Sprūde	Latvia	–	o	o	o	xxo	xxx									1.65	795		1737	17
21	A	Chiara-Belinda Schuler	Austria	xo	o	o	xxo	xxx										1.62	759		1762	15
22	A	Vilma Itälinna	Finland	o	xo	o	xxx											1.59	724		1790	12
23	A	Noémie Desailly	France	o	o	xxo	xxx											1.59	724	=PB	1681	20

=== Shot put ===
Rank	Group	Name	Nationality	Round			Result	Points	Notes	Overall	
Rank	Group	Name	Nationality	1	2	3	Result	Points	Notes	Pts	Rank
1	B	Saga Vanninen	Finland	13.82	14.00	15.36	15.36	885	PB	2876	1
2	B	Anastasia Ntragkomirova	Greece	13.46	14.14	14.13	14.14	803		2476	13
3	B	Sofie Dokter	Netherlands	13.18	13.35	13.68	13.68	773	PB	2851	2
4	A	Jenna Fee Feyerabend	Germany	13.10	13.58	13.05	13.58	766		2578	4
5	B	Chiara-Belinda Schuler	Austria	13.16	x	13.45	13.45	757		2519	9
6	A	Julia Słocka	Poland	13.22	11.82	12.79	13.22	742	SB	2565	6
7	B	Noémie Desailly	France	13.16	13.10	x	13.16	738		2419	16
8	B	Angel Richmore	Sweden	x	12.88	x	12.88	719		1660	23
9	B	Marie Dehning	Germany	12.77	12.62	x	12.77	712		2413	17
10	B	Karla Schärfe	Denmark	12.36	12.71	12.48	12.71	708		2452	14
11	A	Vilma Itälinna	Finland	10.68	12.20	12.57	12.57	696	PB	2486	12
12	B	Katelyn Adel	Switzerland	11.41	12.36	12.03	12.36	685		2605	3
13	A	Krista Sprūde	Latvia	x	12.10	11.87	12.10	668		2405	18
14	B	Kristīne Blaževiča	Latvia	11.58	12.06	11.67	12.06	665		2527	8
15	A	Elena Debelic	Switzerland	11.57	11.29	12.01	12.01	662		2439	15
16	A	Pippi Lotta Enok	Estonia	11.67	11.94	x	11.94	657		2569	5
17	A	Szabina Szűcs	Hungary	9.67	11.61	11.83	11.83	650		2510	10
18	A	Neea Käyhkö	Finland	11.36	11.70	11.50	11.70	641	PB	2547	7
19	B	Jodie Smith	Great Britain	10.54	11.15	11.66	11.66	639		2502	11
20	A	Edyta Bielska	Poland	10.67	11.34	11.14	11.34	618		2382	19
21	A	Sophia Mulder	Netherlands	10.95	11.32	11.27	11.32	616		2298	21
22	A	Olivija Vaitaitytė	Lithuania	10.18	x	11.11	11.11	602		2275	22
23	A	Pauline Bikembo	France	9.62	9.62	7.81	9.62	505		2352	20

=== 200 metres ===
Rank	Heat	Name	Nationality	Time	Points	Notes	Overall	
Rank	Heat	Name	Nationality	Time	Points	Notes	Points	Rank
1	3	Sofie Dokter	Netherlands	23.92	988		3839	1
2	3	Pippi Lotta Enok	Estonia	24.01	980	PB	3549	3
3	3	Vilma Itälinna	Finland	24.03	978		3464	6
4	3	Pauline Bikembo	France	24.29	953	PB	3305	15
5	2	Saga Vanninen	Finland	24.32	950		3826	2
6	3	Julia Słocka	Poland	24.44	939		3504	4
7	3	Marie Dehning	Germany	24.54	929		3342	14
8	2	Noémie Desailly	France	24.54	929	SB	3348	12
9	2	Jodie Smith	Great Britain	24.65	919		3421	8
10	2	Szabina Szűcs	Hungary	24.73	912		3422	7
11	2	Katelyn Adel	Switzerland	24.88	898		3503	5
12	2	Chiara-Belinda Schuler	Austria	24.90	896	=PB	3415	9
13	2	Edyta Bielska	Poland	24.98	889		3271	17
14	3	Kristīne Blaževiča	Latvia	25.06	881		3408	10
15	1	Elena Debelic	Switzerland	25.50	841		3280	16
16	1	Krista Sprūde	Latvia	25.51	841	PB	3246	19
17	2	Sophia Mulder	Netherlands	25.57	835		3133	21
18	1	Jenna Fee Feyerabend	Germany	25.87	809		3387	11
19	1	Neea Käyhkö	Finland	26.01	796	SB	3343	13
20	1	Olivija Vaitaitytė	Lithuania	26.07	791		3066	22
21	1	Anastasia Ntragkomirova	Greece	26.16	783	SB	3259	18
22	1	Karla Schärfe	Denmark	26.88	722		3174	20
	1	Angel Richmore	Sweden	DNS				

=== Long jump ===
Rank	Group	Name	Nationality	Round			Result	Points	Notes	Overall	
Rank	Group	Name	Nationality	1	2	3	Result	Points	Notes	Pts	Rank
1	B	Saga Vanninen	Finland	6.02	5.83	5.80	6.02	856		4682	1
2	B	Pippi Lotta Enok	Estonia	6.01	5.89	5.91	6.01	853		4402	3
3	B	Sofie Dokter	Netherlands	5.93	5.81	5.95	5.95	834		4673	2
4	B	Noémie Desailly	France	5.89	5.72	5.90	5.90	819		4167	9
5	B	Szabina Szűcs	Hungary	5.61	x	5.87	11.83	810		4232	7
6	B	Elena Debelic	Switzerland	5.86	5.56	x	5.86	807		4087	13
7	A	Vilma Itälinna	Finland	x	x	5.81	5.81	792		4256	5
8	A	Chiara-Belinda Schuler	Austria	5.63	5.58	5.80	5.80	789		4204	8
9	B	Neea Käyhkö	Finland	5.79	5.55	x	5.79	786		4129	12
10	B	Edyta Bielska	Poland	5.68	5.45	5.77	5.77	780		4051	15
11	A	Julia Słocka	Poland	5.67	x	5.75	5.75	774		4278	4
12	A	Jenna Fee Feyerabend	Germany	5.69	5.37	5.45	5.69	756		4143	11
13	A	Krista Sprūde	Latvia	5.68	3.63	5.07	5.68	753		3999	17
14	B	Katelyn Adel	Switzerland	5.45	5.33	5.64	5.64	741		4244	6
15	A	Marie Dehning	Germany	5.63	5.59	5.35	5.63	738		4080	14
16	A	Pauline Bikembo	France	5.46	x	5.60	5.60	729		4034	16
17	B	Jodie Smith	Great Britain	x	x	5.58	5.58	723		4144	10
18	A	Anastasia Ntragkomirova	Greece	5.37	5.50	5.41	5.50	700		3959	18
19	A	Olivija Vaitaitytė	Lithuania	5.27	x	5.44	5.44	683		3749	21
20	A	Karla Schärfe	Denmark	x	5.32	x	5.32	648		3822	20
21	B	Kristīne Blaževiča	Latvia	3.37	3.43	4.59	4.59	451		3859	19
	A	Sophia Mulder	Netherlands	x	x	x	NM	0		3133	22

=== Javelin throw ===
Rank	Group	Name	Nationality	Round			Result	Points	Notes	Overall	
Rank	Group	Name	Nationality	1	2	3	Result	Points	Notes	Pts	Rank
1	B	Chiara-Belinda Schuler	Austria	47.50	46.92	47.70	47.70	816		5020	5
2	B	Karla Schärfe	Denmark	43.57	46.92	47.47	47.47	811		4633	19
3	B	Saga Vanninen	Finland	42.30	45.93	46.55	46.55	793	SB	5475	1
4	B	Marie Dehning	Germany	41.37	45.84	45.53	45.84	780		4860	7
5	B	Julia Słocka	Poland	43.28	45.63	45.73	45.73	778		5056	4
6	B	Anastasia Ntragkomirova	Greece	41.21	40.63	43.82	43.82	741		4700	16
7	B	Pippi Lotta Enok	Estonia	X	43.75	43.09	43.75	739		5141	3
8	A	Jenna Fee Feyerabend	Germany	42.59	40.67	39.18	42.59	717	PB	4860	7
9	A	Edyta Bielska	Poland	X	40.62	42.52	42.52	716		4767	13
10	B	Sofie Dokter	Netherlands	38.48	38.60	41.82	41.82	702		5375	2
11	A	Szabina Szűcs	Hungary	39.98	40.92	-	40.92	685	SB	4917	6
12	A	Neea Käyhkö	Finland	38.73	38.00	39.96	39.96	667	PB	4796	12
13	B	Olivija Vaitaitytė	Lithuania	39.82	38.40	38.06	39.82	664		4413	20
14	A	Noémie Desailly	France	39.77	39.11	38.07	39.77	663	SB	4830	10
15	B	Pauline Bikembo	France	39.02	36.05	-	39.02	649		4683	17
16	B	Krista Sprūde	Latvia	34.86	38.40	37.21	38.40	637		4636	18
17	B	Elena Debelic	Switzerland	36.22	34.94	38.17	38.17	632		4719	15
18	A	Sophia Mulder	Netherlands	36.52	34.95	37.70	37.70	623		3756	21
19	A	Katelyn Adel	Switzerland	36.71	35.54	37.29	37.29	615	SB	4859	9
20	A	Jodie Smith	Great Britain	36.20	33.92	33.60	36.20	595		4739	14
21	A	Vilma Itälinna	Finland	x	34.91	32.89	34.91	570	SB	4826	11

=== 800 metres ===
Rank	Heat	Name	Nationality	Time	Points	Notes	Overall	
Rank	Heat	Name	Nationality	Time	Points	Notes	Points	Rank
1	2	Edyta Bielska	Poland	2:09.64	970		5737	6
2	1	Sophia Mulder	Netherlands	2:13.62	912		4668	21
3	3	Sofie Dokter	Netherlands	2:15.84	881	PB	6256	2
4	2	Noémie Desailly	France	2:17.01	865		5695	10
5	2	Katelyn Adel	Switzerland	2:17.26	861	PB	5720	7
6	3	Pippi Lotta Enok	Estonia	2:17.26	861	PB	6002	3
7	1	Olivija Vaitaitytė	Lithuania	2:18.42	845		5258	20
8	2	Vilma Itälinna	Finland	2:18.57	843	PB	5669	12
9	3	Marie Dehning	Germany	2:18.67	842	SB	5702	9
10	3	Saga Vanninen	Finland	2:18.67	842		6317	1
11	3	Julia Słocka	Poland	2:19.22	834		5890	4
12	3	Jenna Fee Feyerabend	Germany	2:19.42	831	PB	5691	11
13	1	Krista Sprūde	Latvia	2:21.86	798		5434	16
14	3	Szabina Szűcs	Hungary	2:22.31	792		5709	8
15	2	Neea Käyhkö	Finland	2:22.89	785	PB	5581	13
16	3	Chiara-Belinda Schuler	Austria	2:23.35	779	SB	5799	5
17	2	Jodie Smith	Great Britain	2:25.51	750		5489	14
18	1	Elena Debelic	Switzerland	2:25.81	746		5465	15
19	1	Pauline Bikembo	France	2:26.32	740		5423	17
20	1	Karla Schärfe	Denmark	2:26.91	732		5365	18
21	1	Anastasia Ntragkomirova	Greece	2:38.24	593		5293	19

=== Final standings ===
The highest mark recorded in each event is highlighted in yellow

Rank	Athlete	Nationality	100m H	HJ	SP	200m	LJ	JT	800m	Points	Notes
1st place, gold medalist(s)	Saga Vanninen	Finland	13.50	1.77	15.36	24.32	6.02	46.55	2:18.67	6317	
2nd place, silver medalist(s)	Sofie Dokter	Netherlands	13.95	1.89	13.68	23.92	5.95	41.82	2:15.84	6256	'
3rd place, bronze medalist(s)	Pippi Lotta Enok	Estonia	14.05	1.77	11.94	24.01	6.01	43.75	2:17.26	6002	
4	Julia Słocka	Poland	14.16	1.71	13.22	24.44	5.75	45.73	2:19.22	5890	PB
5	Chiara-Belinda Schuler	Austria	13.83	1.62	13.45	24.90	5.80	47.70	2:23.35	5799	
6	Edyta Bielska	Poland	14.32	1.68	11.34	24.98	5.77	42.52	2:09.64	5737	
7	Katelyn Adel	Switzerland	14.26	1.80	12.36	24.88	5.64	37.29	2:17.26	5720	PB
8	Szabina Szűcs	Hungary	13.90	1.71	11.83	24.73	5.87	40.92	2:22.31	5709	PB
9	Marie Dehning	Germany	14.78	1.68	12.77	24.54	5.63	45.84	2:18.67	5702	
10	Noémie Desailly	France	14.15	1.59	13.16	24.54	5.90	39.77	2:17.01	5695	PB
11	Jenna Fee Feyerabend	Germany	14.24	1.71	13.58	25.87	5.69	42.59	2:19.42	5691	
12	Vilma Itälinna	Finland	13.39	1.59	12.52	24.03	5.81	34.91	2:18.57	5669	
13	Neea Käyhkö	Finland	14.36	1.80	11.70	26.01	5.79	39.96	2:22.89	5581	SB
14	Jodie Smith	Great Britain	13.62	1.68	11.66	24.65	5.58	36.20	2:25.51	5489	SB
15	Elena Debelic	Switzerland	14.22	1.68	12.01	25.50	5.86	38.17	2:25.81	5465	
16	Krista Sprūde	Latvia	14.26	1.65	12.10	25.51	5.68	38.40	2:21.86	5434	
17	Pauline Bikembo	France	13.73	1.68	9.62	24.29	5.60	39.02	2:26.32	5423	
18	Karla Schärfe	Denmark	14.46	1.68	12.71	26.88	5.32	47.47	2:26.91	5365	
19	Anastasia Ntragkomirova	Greece	14.99	1.68	14.14	26.16	5.50	43.82	2:38.24	5293	
20	Olivija Vaitaitytė	Lithuania	14.73	1.65	11.11	26.07	5.44	39.82	2:18.42	5258	
21	Sophia Mulder	Netherlands	14.66	1.65	11.32	25.57	NM	37.70	2:13.62	4668	
22	Kristīne Blaževiča	Latvia	13.88	1.71	12.06	25.06	4.59	DNS		3859	
	Angel Richmore	Sweden	DNF	1.77	12.88	DNS				DNF	
