= List of Icelandic records in athletics =

The following are the national records in athletics in Iceland maintained by its national athletics federation: Frjálsíþróttasamband Íslands (FRÍ).

Key to tables: Awaiting ratification Record not kept by FRI Not ratified or later rescinded by FRI

== Outdoor ==
=== Men ===
Event	Record	Athlete	Date	Meet	Place	Ref.
60 m	6.90 (+1.2 m/s)	Þorsteinn Ingvarsson	22 July 2009	Hálfleiksmót	Akureyri, Iceland	
100 m	10.51 (+1.5 m/s)	Ari Bragi Kárason	2 July 2017	Coca Cola mót FH	Hafnarfjörður, Iceland	
100 m	10.51 (−0.7 m/s)	Kolbeinn Höður Gunnarsson	3 June 2023	Trond Mohn Games	Bergen, Norway	
100 m	10.51 (−0.5 m/s)	Kolbeinn Höður Gunnarsson	20 June 2023	European Team Championships	Chorzów, Poland	
200 m	20.91 (+0.8 m/s)	Kolbeinn Höður Gunnarsson	28 May 2023	Nordic Championships	Copenhagen, Denmark	
300 m	33.86	Jón Arnar Magnússon	14 May 1994		Mosfellsbær, Iceland	
400 m	45.36	Oddur Sigurðsson	12 May 1984		Austin, United States	
800 m	1:48.83	Erlingur Jóhannsson	4 July 1987	Bislett Games	Oslo, Norway	
1000 m	2:21.1 h	Jón Diðriksson	15 June 1980		Minden, West Germany	
1500 m	3:39.90	Baldvin Þór Magnússon	24 July 2024	BMC Record Breaker	London, United Kingdom	
Mile	3:57.63	Jón Diðriksson	25 August 1982		Koblenz, West Germany	
Mile (road)	4:21	Baldvin Þór Magnússon	28 April 2026	Vecct götumílan	Hafnarfjörður, Iceland	
2000 m	5:11.34	Jón Diðriksson	7 July 1981		Arnsberg, West Germany	
3000 m	7:49.68	Baldvin Þór Magnússon	1 July 2023	British Milers Club Grand Prix	Watford, United Kingdom	
Two miles	9:05.0 h	Ágúst Ásgeirsson	29 May 1976		Gateshead, United Kingdom	
5000 m	13:20.34	Baldvin Þór Magnússon	30 April 2024	Meeting Iberoamericano de Atletismo	Huelva, Spain	
5 km (road)	13:42	Baldvin Þór Magnússon	16 March 2024	Podium Festival	Leicester, United Kingdom	
10,000 m	28:36.80	Hlynur Andrésson	5 June 2021	European 10,000m Cup	Birmingham, Great Britain	
10,000 m	28:25.67	Baldvin Þór Magnússon	15 August 2026	European Championships	Birmingham, United Kingdom	
10 km (road)	27:40	Baldvin Þór Magnússon	11 January 2026	10K Valencia Ibercaja by Kiprun	Valencia, Spain	
One hour	18143 m+	Sigurður Pétur Sigmundsson	28 September 1982		Reykjavík, Iceland	
20,000 m (track)	1:06:09.6	Sigurður Pétur Sigmundsson	28 September 1982		Reykjavík, Iceland	
Half marathon	1:02:47	Hlynur Andrésson	17 October 2020	World Half Marathon Championships	Gdynia, Poland	
Marathon	2:13:37	Hlynur Andrésson	21 March 2021	Dresden Marathon	Dresden, Germany	
100 km (road)	6:24:53	Arnar Pétursson	28 March 2026	SLO24 Koper 2026	Koper, Slovenia	
110 m hurdles	13.91 (+1.9 m/s)	Jón Arnar Magnússon	6 June 1997	Games of the Small States of Europe	Reykjavík, Iceland	
200 m hurdles	23.8 h	Þorvaldur Víðir Þórsson	30 August 1983		Reykjavík, Iceland	
300 m hurdles	37.68	Björgvin Víkingsson	21 May 2009		Langenthal, Germany	
400 m hurdles	51.17	Björgvin Víkingsson	24 May 2008		Rehlingen, Germany	
2000 m steeplechase	5:47.10	Sveinn Margeirsson	14 September 2002	La Laguna Isla de Tenerife International Meeting	Tenerife, Spain	
3000 m steeplechase	8:44.11	Hlynur Andrésson	25 May 2018	NCAA East Preliminary Round	Tampa, United States	
High jump	2.25 m	Einar Karl Hjartarson	2 June 2001	Games of the Small States of Europe	San Marino	
Pole vault	5.31 m	Sigurður T. Sigurðsson	31 May 1984		Lage, West Germany	
Long jump	8.21 m (+1.7 m/s)	Daniel Ingi Egilsson	19 May 2024	Nordic Championships	Malmö, Sweden	
Triple jump	16.70 m	Vilhjálmur Einarsson	7 August 1960	National Championships	Reykjavík, Iceland	
Shot put	21.26 m	Pétur Guðmundsson	10 November 1990	Kastmót Ármanns	Mosfellsbær, Iceland	
Discus throw	69.35 m	Guðni Valur Guðnason	16 September 2020	Haustkastmót ÍR (Íþróttafélag Reykjavíkur) no. 1.	Reykjavík, Iceland	
Hammer throw	78.03 m	Hilmar Örn Jónsson	15 March 2026	European Throwing Cup	Nicosia, Cyprus	
Javelin throw	86.80 m	Einar Vilhjálmsson	30 August 1992	Kastmót Flugleiða	Reykjavík, Iceland	
Weight throw	21.87 m	Hilmar Örn Jónsson	4 September 2020	Kastþraut Óla Guðmunds	Selfoss, Iceland	
Decathlon	8573 pts	Jón Arnar Magnússon	30–31 May 1998	Hypo-Meeting	Götzis, Austria	
Decathlon	100m (wind) / Long jump (wind) / Shot put / High jump / 400m / 110m H (wind) / Discus / Pole vault / Javelin / 1500m; 10.74 (+0.5 m/s) / 7.60 m (−0.2 m/s) / 16.03 m / 2.03 m / 47.66 / 14.24 (−0.7 m/s) / 47.82 m / 5.10 m / 59.77 m / 4:46.43					
4 × 100 m relay	40.27	Iceland; Gylfi Ingvar Gylfason, Kristófer Þorgrímsson, Dagur Andri Einarsson, Kolbeinn Höður Gunnarsson	21 June 2023	European Team Championships	Chorzów, Poland	
4 × 200 m relay	1:28.43	Sveit UMSK; Hörður Gunnarsson, Kristján Friðjónsson, Egill Eiðsson, Ingi Þór Hauksson	1 July 1994	Miðnæturmót ÍR	Reykjavík, Iceland	
4 × 400 m relay	3:10.36	Iceland; Egill Eiðsson, Guðmundur Skúlason, Þorvaldur Víðir Þórsson, Oddur Sigurðsson	31 July 1983	Six Nations Athletics Competition	Edinburgh, United Kingdom	
4 × 800 m relay	7:45.38	Sveit UMSS; Björn Margeirsson, Stefán Már Ágústsson, Ragnar Frosti Frostason, Sigurbjörn Árni Arngrímsson	7 September 2002		Kópavogur, Iceland	
4 × 1500 m relay	16:24.4 h	Sveit FH; Jóhann Ingibergsson, Frímann Hreinsson, Steinn Jóhannsson, Finnbogi Gylfason	6 June 1993	Icelandic Combined Events Championships	Reykjavík, Iceland	

=== Women ===
Event	Record	Athlete	Date	Meet	Place	Ref.
60 m	7.68 (−1.6 m/s)	Hafdís Sigurðardóttir	20 July 2013		Laugar, Iceland	
60 m	7.51 (+1.4 m/s)	Christina Alba Marcus Hafliðadóttir	27 June 2026	Vígslumót Vísisvallar	Hrollaugastaðir, Iceland	
100 m	11.56 (+0.6 m/s)	Guðbjörg Jóna Bjarnadóttir	29 June 2019	Juga 2019	Mannheim, Germany	
200 m	23.44 (+1.1 m/s)	Eir Chang Hlésdóttir	25 June 2025	European Team Championships	Maribor, Slovenia	
300 m	37.98	Guðbjörg Jóna Bjarnadóttir	3 July 2016	Göteborg Världsungdomsspelen	Gothenburg, Sweden	
400 m	52.83	Guðrún Arnardóttir	17 August 1997		London, United Kingdom	
600 m	1:32.71	Þórdís Eva Steinsdóttir	7 June 2014	FH Club Meeting	Hafnarfjörður, Iceland	
800 m	2:00.05	Aníta Hinriksdóttir	15 June 2017	Bislett Games	Oslo, Norway	
1000 m	2:36.63	Anita Hinriksdottir	24 May 2015	Fanny Blankers-Koen Games	Hengelo, Netherlands	
1500 m	4:06.43	Aníta Hinriksdóttir	11 June 2017	Fanny Blankers-Koen Games	Hengelo, Netherlands	
Mile	4:29.20	Aníta Hinriksdóttir	3 June 2018	Fanny Blankers-Koen Games	Hengelo, Netherlands	
Mile (road)	4:59	Andrea Kolbeinsdóttir	28 April 2026	Vecct götumílan	Hafnarfjörður, Iceland	
2000 m	6:17.5 h	Fríða Rún Þórðardóttir	16 July 1992		Greve, Denmark	
3000 m	8:58.00	Ragnheiður Ólafsdóttir	5 June 1987	NCAA Championships	Baton Rouge, United States	
5000 m	15:53.5 h	Martha Ernstsdóttir	4 August 1991		Essen, Germany	
5 km (road)	16:02	Andrea Kolbeinsdóttir	23 April 2026	Víðavangshlaup ÍR	Reykjavík, Iceland	
10,000 m	32:47.40	Martha Ernstsdóttir	12 June 1994	European Championships	Dublin, Ireland	
10 km (road)	33:32	Martha Ernstsdóttir	5 September 1998		Selfoss, Iceland	
Half marathon	1:11:40	Martha Ernstsdóttir	18 August 1996	Reykjavík Marathon	Reykjavík, Iceland	
Marathon	2:35:15	Martha Ernstsdóttir	26 September 1999	Berlin Marathon	Berlin, Germany	
100 m hurdles	13.02	Júlía Kristín Jóhannesdóttir	18 April 2026	Beach Invitational	Long Beach, United States	
200 m hurdles	28.1 h	Helga Halldórsdóttir	22 July 1981		Reykjavík, Iceland	
300 m hurdles	43.50	Þórdís Eva Steinsdóttir	27 June 2014	Världsungdomsspelen	Gothenburg, Sweden	
400 m hurdles	54.37	Guðrún Arnardóttir	5 August 2000		London, United Kingdom	
2000 m steeplechase	6:31.74	Aníta Hinriksdóttir	6 September 2024	23. Volksbank Trier Flutlichtmeeting	Trier, Germany	
3000 m steeplechase	10:07.38	Andrea Kolbeinsdóttir	24 June 2025	European Team Championships	Maribor, Slovenia	
High jump	1.88 m	Þórdís Lilja Gísladóttir	19 August 1990		Grimsby, United Kingdom	
Pole vault	4.60 m	Þórey Edda Elísdóttir	17 July 2004		Madrid, Spain	
Long jump	6.62 m (+1.6 m/s)	Hafdís Sigurðardóttir	9 July 2016		Hilversum, Netherlands	
Triple jump	13.72 m (+0.7 m/s)	Irma Gunnarsdóttir	25 June 2025	European Team Championships	Maribor, Slovenia	
Shot put	17.91 m	Erna Sóley Gunnarsdóttir	30 June 2024	Icelandic Championships	Akureyri, Iceland	
Discus throw	55.95 m	Hera Christensen	26 August 2025		Hafnarfjörður, Iceland	
Discus throw	57.34 m	Hera Christensen	11 August 2026	Héraðsmót HSK	Selfoss, Iceland	
Hammer throw	73.88 m A	Guðrún Karítas Hallgrímsdóttir	24 April 2026	Kip Keino Classic	Nairobi, Kenia	
Javelin throw	63.43 m	Ásdís Hjálmsdóttir	12 July 2017	Joensuu Games	Joensuu, Finland	
Weight throw	16.65 m	Sandra Pétursdóttir	25 March 2012	Kastestævner	Hvidovre, Denmark	
Heptathlon	5878 pts	Helga Margrét Þorsteinsdóttir	23–24 June 2009	TNT – Fortuna Meeting	Kladno, Czech Republic	
Heptathlon	100m H (wind) / High jump / Shot put / 200m (wind) / Long jump (wind) / Javelin / 800m; 14.19 / 1.73 m / 14.09 m / 24.77 / 5.78 m / 40.17 m / 2:16.40					
4 × 100 m relay	45.31	Iceland; Tíana Ósk Whitworth, Hrafnhildur Eir Hermóðsdóttir, Guðbjörg Jóna Bjarnadóttir, Arna Guðmundsdóttir	3 June 2017	Games of the Small States of Europe	Serravalle, San Marino	
4 × 200 m relay	1:43.72	Sveit Ármanns; Sólveig Björnsdóttir, Svanhildur Kristjánsdóttir, Geirlaug Geirlaugsdóttir, Guðrún Arnardóttir	29 June 1993		Mosfellsbær, Iceland	
4 × 400 m relay	3:38.96	Iceland; Geirlaug Geirlaugsdóttir, Helga Halldórsdóttir, Sunna Gestsdóttir, Guðrún Arnardóttir	29 June 1996		Fana, Norway	
4 × 800 m relay	10:03.06	Meyjasveit Fjölnis; Heiðdís Rut Hreinsdóttir, Stefanía Hákonardóttir, Íris Anna Skúladóttir, Júlíanna Gunnarsdóttir	19 September 2005		Reykjavík, Iceland	

=== Mixed ===
Event	Record	Athlete	Date	Meet	Place	Ref.
4 × 400 m relay	3:25.96	Iceland; Ívar Kristinn Jasonarson, Guðbjörg Jóna Bjarnadóttir, Sæmundur Ólafsson, Ísold Sævarsdóttir	25 June 2025	European Team Championships	Maribor, Slovenia	

== Indoor ==
=== Men ===
Event	Record	Athlete	Date	Meet	Place	Ref.
50 m	5.93	Jóhannes Már Marteinsson	24 January 1999		Reykjavík, Iceland	
50 m	5.6 h	Vilmundur Vilhjálmsson	31 December 1973		Óþekkt, Iceland	
50 m	5.6 h	Einar Þór Einarsson	16 February 1991		Reykjavík, Iceland	
50 m	5.6 h	Einar Þór Einarsson	13 February 1993		Reykjavík, Iceland	
60 m	6.68	Kolbeinn Höður Gunnarsson	12 January 2023	Nike mótaröðin	Hafnarfjörður, Iceland	
200 m	21.03	Kolbeinn Höður Gunnarsson	5 February 2023	Reykjavik International Games	Reykjavík, Iceland	
400 m	47.59	Kolbeinn Höður Gunnarsson	1 February 2015	Stórmót ÍR	Reykjavík, Iceland	
600 m	1:20.26	Sæmundur Ólafsson	6 March 2019		Reykjavík, Iceland	
800 m	1:51.07	Björn Margeirsson	28 January 2006		Reykjavík, Iceland	
1000 m	2:24.52	Björn Margeirsson	2 February 2006		Stockholm, Sweden	
1500 m	3:39.67	Baldvin Þór Magnússon	27 January 2025	Reykjavik International Games	Reykjavík, Iceland	
Mile	3:59.60	Baldvin Þór Magnússon	14 January 2023	2023 Michigan Invitational	Ann Arbor, United States	
2000 m	5:25.23	Björn Margeirsson	19 December 2005		Reykjavík, Iceland	
3000 m	7:39.94	Baldvin Þór Magnússon	9 February 2025	Nordic Championship	Espoo, Finland	
5000 m	13:58.24	Baldvin Þór Magnússon	24 February 2023	MAC Championship	Bowling Green, United States	
50 m hurdles	6.76	Jón Arnar Magnússon	5 March 2000		Reykjavík, Iceland	
60 m hurdles	7.98	Jón Arnar Magnússon	13 February 2000	Icelandic Championships	Reykjavík, Iceland	
High jump	2.28 m	Einar Karl Hjartarson	18 February 2001	Icelandic Championships	Reykjavík, Iceland	
Pole vault	5.30 m	Sigurður T. Sigurðsson	18 March 1984		Sankt Augustin, West-Germany	
Long jump	7.82 m	Jón Arnar Magnússon	5 March 2000	Stórmót ÍR	Reykjavík, Iceland	
Triple jump	15.49 m	Daníel Ingi Egilsson	18 February 2023	Icelandic Indoor Athletics Championship	Reykjavík, Iceland	
Shot put	20.66 m	Pétur Guðmundsson	3 November 1990		Reykjavík, Iceland	
Weight throw	21.96 m	Hilmar Örn Jónsson	12 February 2022	Nordenkampen	Uppsala, Sweden	
Heptathlon	6293 pts	Jón Arnar Magnússon	6–7 March 1999	World Championships	Maebashi, Japan	
Heptathlon	60m / Long jump / Shot put / High jump / 60m H / Pole vault / 1000m; 6.99 / 7.69 m / 16.08 m / 2.02 m / 8.09 / 5.00 m / 2:39.55					
4 × 200 m relay	1:27.13	Iceland; Ari Bragi Kárason, Hinrik Snær Steinsson, Kormákur Ari Hafliðason, Ívar Kristinn Jasonarson	3 February 2019		Reykjavík, Iceland	
4 × 400 m relay	3:19.11	ÍR; Helgi Björnsson, Snorri Sigurðsson, Einar Daði Lárusson, Ívar Kristinn Jasonarson	18 February 2012	Icelandic Club Championships	Reykjavík, Iceland	

=== Women ===
Event	Record	Athlete	Date	Meet	Place	Ref.
50 m	6.50	Guðrún Arnardóttir	24 January 1999		Reykjavík, Iceland	
50 m	6.2 h	Geirlaug Geirlaugsdóttir	27 January 1995		Reykjavík, Iceland	
50 m	6.2 h	Geirlaug Geirlaugsdóttir	20 January 1996		Reykjavík, Iceland	
60 m	7.35	Guðbjörg Jóna Bjarnadóttir	25 January 2023	Aarhus SPRINT'n'JUMP	Aarhus, Denmark	
200 m	23.54	Eir Chang Hlésdóttir	1 February 2026	Nordic Indoor Athletics Match	Karlstad, Sweden	
300 m	38.29	Silja Úlfarsdóttir	6 December 2003		Clemson, United States	
400 m	53.14	Guðrún Arnardóttir	26 February 2000	European Championships	Ghent, Belgium	
600 m	1:27.65	Aníta Hinriksdóttir	19 December 2014	Jólamót ÍR	Reykjavík, Iceland	
800 m	2:01.18	Aníta Hinriksdóttir	4 February 2017	Reykjavik International Games	Reykjavík, Iceland	
1000 m	2:43.22	Aníta Hinriksdóttir	15 December 2012	Aðventumót Ármanns	Reykjavík, Iceland	
1500 m	4:09.54	Aníta Hinriksdóttir	6 February 2018	PSD Bank Meeting	Düsseldorf, Germany	
Mile	4:41.83	Ragnheiður Ólafsdóttir	14 February 1988		Fairfax, United States	
3000 m	9:07.02	Ragnheiður Ólafsdóttir	12 March 1988		Oklahoma City, United States	
Two miles	10:02.9 h	Ragnheiður Ólafsdóttir	6 December 2003	9. Gamlárshlaup ÍR	Reykjavík, Iceland	
5000 m	17:25.35 (Note: ratified by World Athletics as a personal best, but not marked as a national record there; not kept as an Icelandic record by FRÍ)	Fríða Rún Þórðardóttir	4 February 1994		Bloomington, United States	
5000 m	16:46.18 OT (Note: ratified by FRÍ but not kept by World Athletics)	Andrea Kolbeinsdóttir	25 March 2023	Góumót Gaflarans	Hafnarfjörður, Iceland	
50 m hurdles	6.89	Guðrún Arnardóttir	5 March 2000		Reykjavík, Iceland	
60 m hurdles	8.11	Júlía Kristín Jóhannesdóttir	22 March 2026	World Championships	Toruń, Poland	
High jump	1.88 m	Þórdís Lilja Gísladóttir	12 March 1983	NCAA Championships	Pontiac, United States	
Pole vault	4.51 m	Þórey Edda Elísdóttir	10 March 2001	NCAA Division I Championships	Fayetteville, United States	
Long jump	6.54 m	Hafdís Sigurðardóttir	23 January 2016	Reykjavik International Games	Reykjavík, Iceland	
Triple jump	13.36 m	Irma Gunnarsdóttir	9 February 2023	2 Nike mótaröðin	Hafnarfjörður, Iceland	
Shot put	17.92 m	Erna Sóley Gunnarsdóttir	19 February 2023	Conference USA Championships	Birmingham, United States	
Weight throw	23.19 m	Guðrún Karítas Hallgrímsdóttir	14 March 2025	NCAA Division I Championships	Virginia, United States	
Pentathlon	4298 pts	Helga Margrét Þorsteinsdóttir	4 February 2012	International Combined Events Meeting	Tallinn, Estonia	
Pentathlon	60m H / High jump / Shot put / Long jump / 800m; 9.03 / 1.74 m / 14.74 m / 5.59 m / 2:12.97					
4 × 200 m relay	1:37.72	Iceland; Melkorka Rán Hafliðadóttir, Guðbjörg Jóna Bjarnadóttir, Glódís Edda Þuríðardóttir, Þórdís Eva Steinsdóttir	3 February 2019		Reykjavík, Iceland	
4 × 400 m relay	3:49.12	ÍR; Arna Stefanía Guðmundsdóttir, Björg Gunnarsdóttir, Dóróthea Jóhannesdóttir, Aníta Hinriksdóttir	10 February 2013	Icelandic Championships	Reykjavík, Iceland	
