= 2021 European Athletics U23 Championships – Women's shot put =

Women's shot put at the 2021 European Athletics U23 Championships
- Venue: Kadriorg Stadium, Tallinn
- Dates: 10 July 2021
- Competitors: 22 from 18 nations
- Winning distance: 18.11 m (59 ft 5 in)

Medalists
gold medal	Jessica Schilder	Netherlands
silver medal	Lea Riedel	Germany
bronze medal	Axelina Johansson	Sweden

The women's shot put event at the 2021 European Athletics U23 Championships was held in Tallinn, Estonia, at Kadriorg Stadium on 10 July 2021.

== Records ==
Prior to the competition, the records were as follows:

European U23 record	Natalya Lisovskaya (URS)	22.53	Sochi, Soviet Union	27 May 1984
Championship U23 record	Nadzeya Astapchuk (BLR)	19.73	Amsterdam, Netherlands	12 July 2001

== Results ==
=== Qualification ===
Qualification rule: 16.50 (Q) or the 12 best results (q) qualified for the final.

Rank	Group	Name	Nationality	#1	#2	#3	Results	Notes
1	B	Axelina Johansson	Sweden	17.63			17.63	Q
2	A	Jessica Schilder	Netherlands	x	15.58	16.99	16.99	Q
3	A	Lea Riedel	Germany	16.92			16.92	Q, PB
4	B	Jorinde van Klinken	Netherlands	16.66			16.66	Q
5	A	Amanda Ngandu-Ntumba	France	15.53	16.29	x	16.29	q, PB
6	B	Thea Jensen	Denmark	14.80	14.58	16.17	16.17	q
7	B	Hanna Meinikmann	Germany	14.93	15.90	15.70	15.90	q
8	B	Marija Tolj	Croatia	15.82	18.59	18.30	15.82	q
9	B	Aysel Yılmaz	Turkey	15.00	15.02	15.59	15.59	q
10	A	Erna Sóley Gunnarsdóttir	Iceland	15.36	x	15.57	15.57	q
11	A	Selina Dantzler	Germany	14.44	x	15.38	15.38	q
12	B	Miryam Mazenauer	Switzerland	14.51	15.16	14.42	15.16	q
13	B	Mónica Borraz	Spain	14.94	14.39	14.65	14.94	
14	A	Tetyana Kravchenko	Ukraine	14.81	x	x	14.81	
15	A	Natália Váleková	Slovakia	x	13.74	14.64	14.64	PB
16	A	Urtė Bačianskaitė	Lithuania	14.22	14.52	14.30	14.52	=SB
17	A	Maria Magkoulia	Greece	x	13.66	14.52	14.52	
18	B	Blanka Tomášková	Czech Republic	14.28	14.04	x	14.28	
19	B	Hanna Khopyak	Ukraine	12.77	13.48	14.28	14.28	
20	B	Ioana Diana Tigănasu	Romania	x	13.34	14.00	14.00	
21	A	Mediha Salkić	Bosnia and Herzegovina	12.91	x	x	12.91	
	A	Emilia Kangas	Finland	x	x	x	NM	

=== Final ===
Rank	Name	Nationality	#1	#2	#3	#4	#5	#6	Result	Notes
1st place, gold medalist(s)	Jessica Schilder	Netherlands	16.20	x	17.56	x	17.85	18.11	18.11	
2nd place, silver medalist(s)	Lea Riedel	Germany	17.23	16.29	16.66	16.50	x	17.86	17.86	PB
3rd place, bronze medalist(s)	Axelina Johansson	Sweden	16.84	17.73	16.82	17.85	x	17.48	17.85	
4	Jorinde van Klinken	Netherlands	16.91	x	16.57	x	16.76	16.56	16.91	
5	Amanda Ngandu-Ntumba	France	14.66	14.90	15.96	x	x	16.07	16.07	
6	Thea Jensen	Denmark	15.44	15.97	x	x	15.63	x	15.97	
7	Selina Dantzler	Germany	15.88	15.60	15.74	15.57	15.27	x	15.88	
8	Hanna Meinikmann	Germany	15.64	15.15	15.87	15.77	x	15.84	15.87	
9	Erna Sóley Gunnarsdóttir	Iceland	x	15.12	15.75				15.75	
10	Marija Tolj	Croatia	15.74	15.23	x				15.74	
11	Aysel Yılmaz	Turkey	13.75	x	15.18				15.18	
12	Miryam Mazenauer	Switzerland	14.26	x	14.41				14.41	
