= Marie Dehning =

German athlete

Personal information
- Nationality: German
- Born: 26 May 2003 (age 23)

Sport
- Sport: Athletics
- Event: Heptathlon

Achievements and titles
- Personal best(s): Heptathlon: 6180 (Götzis, 2026)
Medal record
Wonen's athletics
Representing Germany
European U20 Championships
Bronze medal – third place	2021 Tallinn	Heptathlon

Marie Dehning (born 26 May 2003) is a German multi-event athlete.

== Biography ==
In February 2020, she competed for LG Celle-Land at the German Indoor Championships and won gold in the U18 pentathlon in Leverkusen with a tally of 4,034 points.

She was a bronze medalist in the heptathlon at the 2021 European Athletics U20 Championships in Tallinn, with a personal best score of 5778 points, finishing behind Saga Vanninen of Finland and the Dutch athlete Sofie Dokter.

In January 2023, she finished fifth in the pentathlon at the German Combined Events Indoor Championships in Leverkusen with a personal best tally of 4045 points. In May 2023, she won the heptathlon at the international junior all-around meeting in Filderstadt with 5952 points. She finished in ninth place in the heptathlon at the 2023 European Athletics U23 Championships in Espoo.

Competing in Tallinn in February 2024, she scores a pentathlon tally of 3946 points. She finished thirteenth in the heptathlon at the Hypo Meeting in Gotzis, Austria in May 2024. In June 2024, she competed in Ratingen in the heptathlon at the 27th Stadtwerke Ratingen Multi-Event Meeting, a Gold status event on the World Athletics Continental Tour. During the event, she threw the shot put to 13.70 metres, improving her previous best by 26 centimetres. On the second day, she managed 56.12 metres in the javelin throw, which improved her personal best by almost three metres and also set a new meeting record. This distance also placed her in second place on the German U23 list of the best athletes in the multi-event category. She finished in sixth place overall with a tally of 5934 points.

At the 2025 Hypo-Meeting in Götzis, she came close to breaking the 6000 points barrier before ultimately finishing on a personal best 5,983 points to place sixteenth overall. It was the fourth heptathlon in which she missed scoring 6000 by less than 70 points.

At the 2026 Hypo-Meeting, Dehning made a personal best throw in the javelin of 56.33m within an overall personal best tally of 6180 points.

== Personal life ==
Her brother Max Dehning is a javelin thrower.
