= Elín Edda Sigurðardóttir =

Icelandic long-distance runner (born 1989)

Personal information
- Born: 17 August 1989 (age 36)

Sport
- Country: Iceland
- Event: Long-distance running
Medal record
Women's long-distance running
Icelandic Indoor Athletics Championships
Silver medal – second place	2017 Reykjavík	3000 m

Elín Edda Sigurðardóttir (born 17 August 1989) is an Icelandic long-distance runner. She competed in the women's half marathon at the 2018 IAAF World Half Marathon Championships held in Valencia, Spain.

In 2019, she finished in 5th place in the women's 10,000 metres at the Games of the Small States of Europe held in Budva, Montenegro. In 2020, she competed in the women's half marathon at the World Athletics Half Marathon Championships held in Gdynia, Poland.
