= Vilma Itälinna =

Finnish heptathlete

Personal information
- Born: 23 May 2003 (age 23) Tampere, Finland

Sport
- Country: Finland
- Sport: Athletics
- Event(s): Heptathlon, Pentathlon
- Club: Tampereen Pyrintö

Achievements and titles
- Personal best(s): Heptathlon: 5703 (Tampere, 2023)

Vilma Itälinna (born 23 May 2003) is a multi-event track and field athlete from Finland. In 2023, she became the Finnish national champion in the pentathlon.

== Career ==
From Tampere, she is a member of Tampereen Pyrintö Athletics Club and is coached by Jesse Jokinen. Since childhood, she has been close friends and training partners with fellow Tampere athlete Saga Vanninen with the pair also playing football together for Ilves. The pair are also trained by former Finnish champion Tiia Hautala.

In August 2021, she won the Finiah National U20 championships in the heptathlon.

In February 2023, she became the national champion in the pentathlon with a new personal best score of 4223 points, which placed her fourth all-time for Finnish U23 female athletes. Her long jump distance was also equal to that reached by the winner of the long jump competition, Jessica Kähärä. She also recorded personal bests in the 60 metres hurdles (8.51 seconds) and in the shot put (12.48m).

In May 2023, she won the Western Finland regional championship in the heptathlon. In doing so, she secured the qualification standard for the European U23 Championship. Competing in the 2023 European Athletics U23 Championships – Women's heptathlon in Espoo in July 2023, she briefly led the competition when she won the 100 metres hurdles event. She also set a new 12.52 personal best in the shot put and finished the first day sixth overall, before gold was ultimately won by her compatriot Saga Vanninen, and Itälinna finished twelfth overall.
