= Kristīne Blaževiča =

Latvian athlete (born 2001)

Personal information
- Nationality: Latvian
- Born: 11 December 2001 (age 24)

Sport
- Sport: Athletics
- Event: Heptathlon

Achievements and titles
- Personal bests: Heptathlon 6146 (2023); Pentathlon 4430 (2024)
Medal record
Women's athletics
Representing Latvia
European U18 Championships
Silver medal – second place	2018 Gyor	Heptathlon

Kristīne Blaževiča (born 11 December 2001) is a Latvian multi-event athlete. In 2022, she became Latvian national champion over 100m hurdles. In 2023, she became NCAA champion in the pentathlon, and in 2024 she became Latvian national champion in the heptathlon.

== Early and personal life ==
She is the daughter of Latvian former international athlete Jeļena Blaževiča and her husband Jurjis Blazevica. Her godmother, and first athletics coach, is four-time Olympian Valentīna Gotovska.

She attended Jūrmala Sports School in Jūrmala, Latvia. She moved to the United States to study at the University of Texas having her freshman academic year 2020–21. She joined the University of Illinois prior to the start of the 2026 indoor season.

== Career ==
She was a silver medalist in the heptathlon at the European Athletics U18 Championships in 2018 in Győr. She finished fifth in the heptathlon at the 2021 European Athletics U23 Championships in Tallinn.

=== 2022 ===
Competing for the University of Texas, she won the pentathlon at the Big 12 Indoor Championships in Iowa in February 2022. The following month she finished sixth in the NCAA Indoor Championships in the pentathlon, held in Birmingham, Alabama.

In June 2022, she won her first national title, winning the Latvian national championships title over 100 metres hurdles.

=== 2023 ===
At the NCAA indoor championships in New Mexico she came 5th.

In May 2023 she won the heptathlon at the Big 12 Outdoor Championships, setting a new personal best points total of 6164. She finished third in the heptathlon at the 2023 NCAA Division I Outdoor Track and Field Championships, in Austin, Texas in June 2023. In doing so, she helped the Texas Longhorns capture their first women's team title since 2005.

She competed for Latvia in the long jump at the 2023 European Team Championships in Silesia.

=== 2024 ===
In March 2024, she finished third in the pentathlon at the 2024 NCAA Division I Indoor Track and Field Championships in Boston, Massachusetts.

In June 2024, she finished third in the heptathlon at the 2024 NCAA Division I Outdoor Track and Field Championships in Eugene, Oregon with a tally of 6126 points.

Later that month, she became Latvian national champion in the heptathlon with a total of 5827 points in Valmiera. She later transferred to the University of Illinois after four years in Texas.
