= Guðrún Karítas Hallgrímsdóttir =

Icelandic athlete

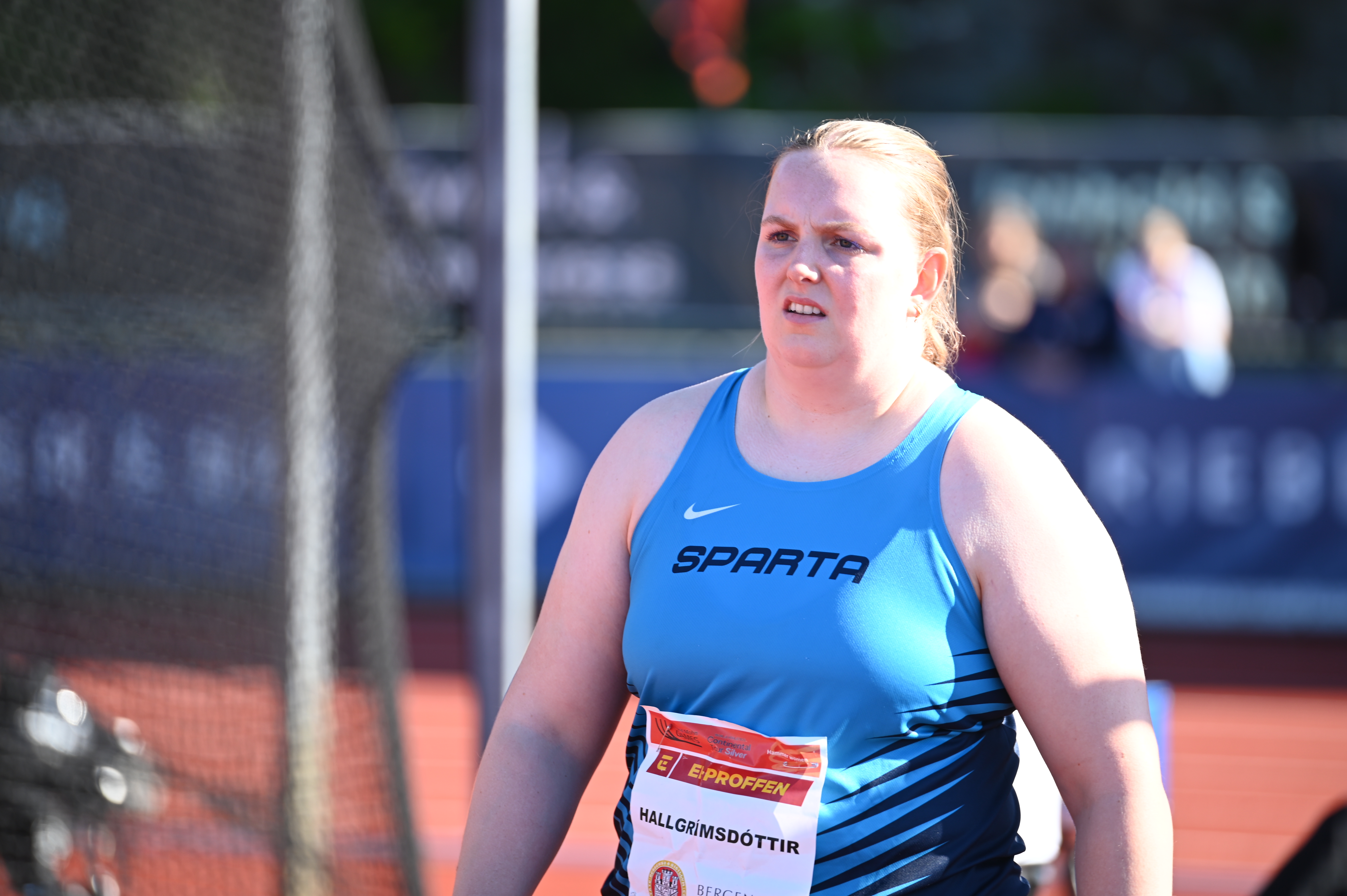
- Guðrún Hallgrímsdóttir in 2026

Personal information
- Nationality: Icelandic
- Born: 7 July 2002 (age 24)

Sport
- Sport: Athletics
- Event: Hammer throw

Achievements and titles
- Personal bests: Hammer: 73.88m (2026) NR
Medal record
Women's athletics
Representing Iceland
European Throwing Cup
Bronze medal – third place	2026 Nicosia	Hammer throw

Guðrún Karítas Hallgrímsdóttir (born 7 July 2002) is an Icelandic hammer thrower.

== Biography ==
From Borgarfjörður, she trained in the hammer throw from 2018 in Laugardalur, before later studying and competing in the United States at Virginia Commonwealth University (VCU).

She won the hammer throw title at the Icelandic Athletics Championships in 2023, and the following year also set a new personal best and school record of 20.37 metres in the shot put whilst competing in Virginia for VCU. She placed fifth in the hammer throw competing at the 2024 NCAA Outdoor Championships with a best throw of 69.12 metres. She made her senior championships debut reorienting Iceland at the 2024 European Athletics Championships in Rome, Italy, in June 2024.

Guðrún Karítas threw a personal best of 69.99 metres competing in the hammer throw in Hungary in August 2025. She threw a new national record of 71.38 metres later that month at the Icelandic Athletics Championships, breaking the mark set previously by Elísabet Rut Rúnarsdóttir. In doing so, she became the second Icelandic woman to surpass 70 metres. She subsequently represented Iceland at the 2025 World Athletics Championships in Tokyo, Japan, in September 2025, achieving a longest throw of 64.94 meters.

Guðrún Karítas broke her national record in winning the bronze medal at the European Throwing Cup in Nicosia on 14 March 2026 by throwing 71.41 metres. On 18 April 2026, Guðrún lost that national record to Elísabet Rut Rúnarsdóttir, only to reclaim it once more a few days later, on 24 April 2026, when she placed third with a throw of 73.88m at the 2026 Kip Keino Classic. In August, she was a finalist competing at the 2026 European Athletics Championships in Birmingham, England, in the hammer throw.
