= Kolbeinn Höður Gunnarsson =

Icelandic sprinter (born 1995)

Kolbeinn Höður Gunnarsson (born 11 July 1995) is an Icelandic sprinter.

He won several titles at European Team Championships. He won 14 national titles, mainly 100 m and 200 m. With 20.96, he is the national record holder of 200 m.
