= Guðbjörg Jóna Bjarnadóttir =

Icelandic sprinter (born 2001)

Personal information
- Born: 24 December 2001 (age 24)
- Height: 1.76 m (5 ft 9 in)

Sport
- Country: Iceland
- Sport: Track and field
- Event(s): 60 m, 100 m, 200 m

Achievements and titles
- Personal bests: 100 m: 11.56 NR (Mannheim 2019); 200 m: 23.45 NR (Selfoss 2019); Indoors; 60 m: 7.35 NR (Aarhus 2023)
Medal record
Women's athletics
Representing Iceland
Youth Olympic Games
Gold medal – first place	2018 Buenos Aires	200 m
European U18 Championships
Gold medal – first place	2018 Győr	100 m
Bronze medal – third place	2018 Győr	200 m

Guðbjörg Jóna Bjarnadóttir (born 24 December 2001) is an Icelandic sprinter competing in the 60 metres, 100 m and 200 m. She won the gold medal in the 200m at the 2018 Youth Olympics Games. She claimed gold in the 100 m and bronze in the 200 m at the 2018 European Under-18 Championships.

She won multiple Icelandic national titles both outdoors and indoors.

== Career ==
Guðbjörg became for the first time Icelandic senior champion in 2016, competing in the 400 m hurdles.

In June 2018, she won the silver medal in the 200 metres at the Championships of the Small States of Europe in Schaan, Liechtenstein in a time of 23.61 seconds. In July, she claimed gold in the 100 m with a time of 11.75 seconds and bronze in the 200 m at the European Under-18 Championships held in Győr, Hungary. The same month, Guðbjörg became the Icelandic 200 m champion for the first time. In October, she competed in the 200 m event at the Summer Youth Olympics in Buenos Aires, winning the gold medal.

Guðbjörg won the 100 m and 200 m at the 2019 Games of the Small States of Europe staged in Bar, Montenegro.

In 2021, she was selected for the 2021 European Athletics Team Championships Second League events held in June in Stara Zagora, Bulgaria. She finished third in the 200 m at the Karlstad Grand Prix in Sweden the same month. Also in June, under the universality rule within the Olympic qualifying criteria which allows smaller nations with developing sports programs to send representatives to the competition, Guðbjörg was confirmed as being selected for the delayed 2020 Tokyo Olympics, but she did not compete at the event.

In January 2023, she twice set a new national indoor record over the 60 metres, first lowering it to 7.43 and then to 7.35 seconds. She was subsequently selected to compete at the European Indoor Championships held in March in Istanbul.
