= Ingibjörg Sigurðardóttir =

Icelandic footballer

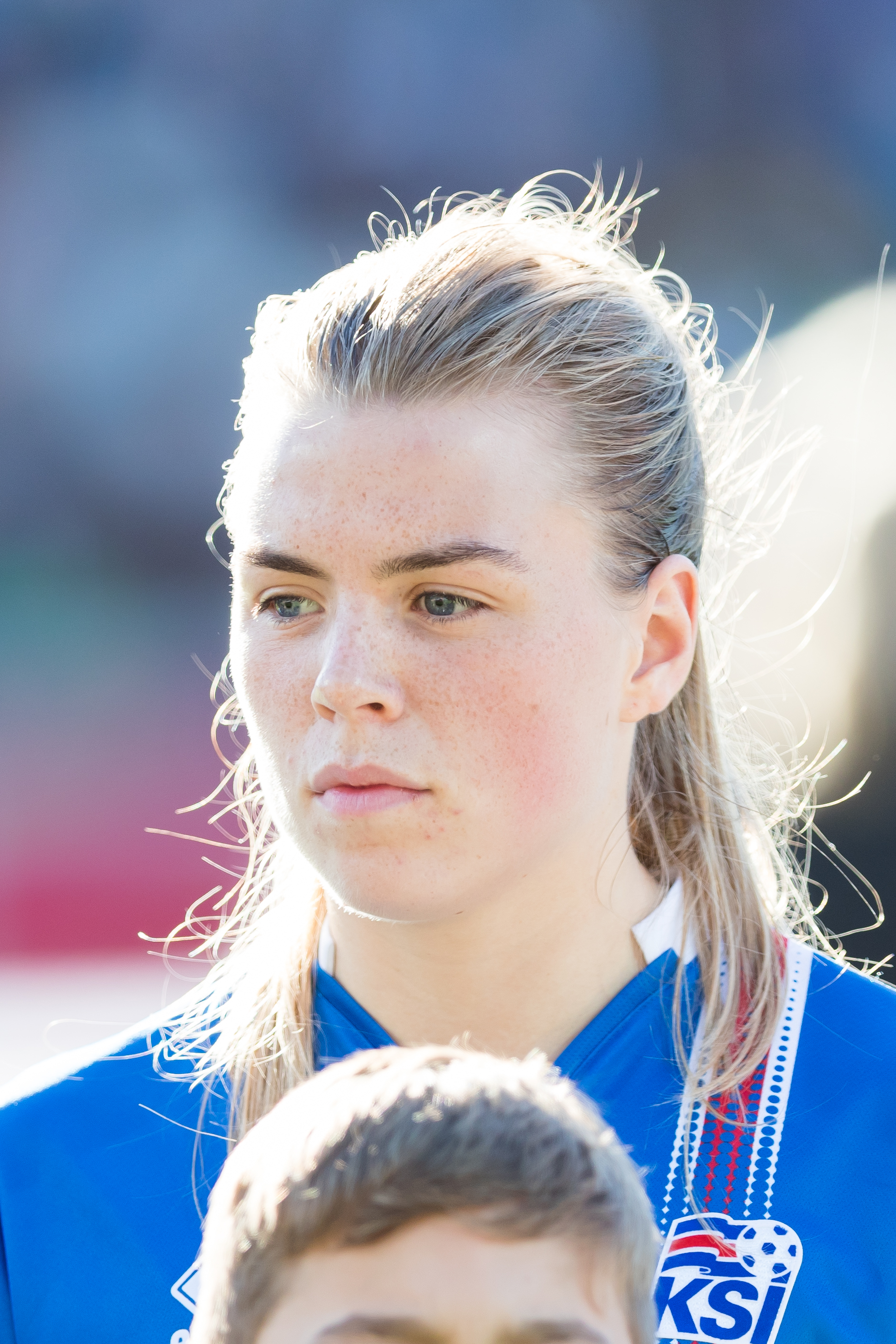
- Ingibjörg representing Iceland in a match against Germany at Brita-Arena, Wiesbaden, Germany on 20 October 2017

Personal information
- Date of birth: 7 October 1997 (age 29)
- Place of birth: Grindavík, Iceland
- Height: 1.67 m (5 ft 6 in)
- Position: Defender

Team information
- Current team: SC Freiburg
- Number: 24

Youth career
- 2009–2012: Grindavík
- 2012–2016: Breiðablik

Senior career*
Years	Team	Apps	(Gls)
2011–2012	Grindavík	6	(1)
2012–2017	Breiðablik	67	(5)
2018–2019	Djurgårdens IF	43	(4)
2020–2023	Vålerenga	82	(15)
2024	MSV Duisburg	11	(0)
2024–2025	Brøndby	20	(2)
2025–	SC Freiburg	19	(1)

International career^{‡}
2012–2013	Iceland U17	14	(3)
2014–2015	Iceland U19	15	(5)
2017–	Iceland	80	(3)
- * Club domestic league appearances and goals as of 19 May 2026 ‡ National team caps and goals as of 29 October 2025

Ingibjörg Sigurðardóttir (born 7 October 1997) is an Icelandic footballer who plays as a defender for SC Freiburg in the Frauen-Bundesliga, the top-tier women's football league in Germany. A multi-sport athlete in her youth, she played in the Icelandic top-tier basketball league and for Iceland's junior national basketball teams before fully focusing on football.

== Football ==
=== Club career ===
Ingibjörg grew up in Grindavík in southwest Iceland and joined the local club Grindavík at a young age. On August 17, 2011, at 13 years old, she debuted for Grindavík's senior in a match against Þróttur Reykjavík in the top-tier women's football league in Iceland. In 2012, at the age of 14 years, Ingibjörg signed with Breiðablik, the record champions in Icelandic women's football. In August 2012, she debuted for Breiðablik senior team. Until 2016, she played alternately with the youth and senior team, then exclusively for the senior team.

In December 2017, Ingibjörg signed with Djurgårdens IF of the Damallsvenskan.

In January 2024, Ingibjörg went to Bundesliga club MSV Duisburg and stayed until summer. In summer 2024, Duisburg had to close down their women's team due to financial issues. Ingibjörg then moved to Brøndby.

In August 2025, Ingibjörg signed with SC Freiburg.

=== National team career ===
At the age of 14, Ingibjörg was called for the Icelandic U-17 team, which participated in the qualifying tournament for the 2012 UEFA Women's Under-17 Championship. Her first game for the U17 team was on April 18, 2012, in Poperinge against Belgium. Ingibjörg also participated in the qualifying tournament for the 2014 UEFA Women's Under-17 Championship. In March 2014, Ingibjörg debuted for the Icelandic U-19 team in a match against Finland. Ingibjörg played her first international match for Iceland senior team on June 8, 2017, in a 0–0 away game against Ireland when she played 90 minutes. Shortly thereafter, Ingibjörg was included in the squad that represented Iceland at the UEFA Women's Euro 2017. She played against France and Switzerland in the Group Stage.

On 13 June 2025, Ingibjörg was called up to the Iceland squad for the UEFA Women's Euro 2025.

=== International goals ===
As of match played 24 October 2025

Appearances and goals by national team and year
National team	Year	Apps	Goals
Iceland	2017	6	0
Iceland	2018	6	0
Iceland	2019	8	0
Iceland	2020	8	0
Iceland	2021	7	0
Iceland	2022	12	0
Iceland	2023	10	0
Iceland	2024	12	1
Iceland	2025	10	2
Total		79	3

No.	Date	Venue	Opponent	Score	Result	Competition
1.	12 July 2024	Laugardalsvöllur, Reykjavík, Iceland	Germany	1–0	3–0	UEFA Women's Euro 2025 qualifying
2.	25 February 2025	Stade Marie-Marvingt, Le Mans, France	France	2–3	2–3	2025 UEFA Women's Nations League
3.	24 October 2025	The Showgrounds, Ballymena, Northern Ireland	Northern Ireland	2–0	2–0	2025 UEFA Women's Nations League play-off matches

== Basketball ==
=== Club career ===
Alongside football, Ingibjörg also played basketball for Grindavík basketball team. She first played for the senior team during the 2011–2012 season in the second-tier 1. deild kvenna. On 30 November 2011, she scored 30 points in a victory against Skallagrímur. The following season she appeared in three games in the top-tier Úrvalsdeild kvenna before fully focusing on football.

=== National team career ===
Ingibjörg played 12 games for the Icelandic U-16 team from 2011 to 2013.

=== Titles ===
1. deild kvenna: 2012
