= Andrea Kolbeinsdóttir =

Icelandic runner (born 1999)

Personal information
- Born: 8 February 1999 (age 27)

Sport
- Country: Iceland
- Events: Middle-distance running; Long-distance running
Medal record
Women's running
Representing Iceland
Games of the Small States of Europe
Bronze medal – third place	2019 Budva	5000 m
Women's running
Icelandic Athletics Championships
Gold medal – first place	2017 Selfoss	1500 m
Gold medal – first place	2017 Selfoss	3000 m
Icelandic Indoor Athletics Championships
Gold medal – first place	2017 Reykjavík	1500 m
Gold medal – first place	2017 Reykjavík	3000 m

Andrea Kolbeinsdóttir (born 8 February 1999) is an Icelandic middle-distance and long-distance runner. In 2019, she won the bronze medal in the women's 5000 metres event at the 2019 Games of the Small States of Europe held Budva, Montenegro.

In 2018, she competed in the women's half marathon at the 2018 IAAF World Half Marathon Championships held in Valencia, Spain. She finished in 99th place. In 2020, she competed in the women's half marathon at the 2020 World Athletics Half Marathon Championships held in Gdynia, Poland.
