= Erna Sóley Gunnarsdóttir =

Icelandic shot putter (born 2000)

Personal information
- Born: 22 March 2000 (age 26)

Sport
- Sport: Athletics
- Event: Shot put

Achievements and titles
- Personal bests: Shot put 17.92m (Birmingham, 2023) NR
Medal record
Women's athletics
Representing Iceland
European U20 Championships
Bronze medal – third place	2019 Borås	Shot put

Erna Sóley Gunnarsdóttir (born 22 March 2000) is an Icelandic shot putter. She holds the Icelandic national record, both outdoors and indoors, in the shot put. In 2024, she became the first female shot putter to represent Iceland at the Olympic Games.

== Biography ==
Gunnarsdóttir took part in many sports at a young age, such as gymnastics, swimming, karate and especially handball. From the age of 15 years-old, she began to focus solely on throwing events in athletics. She graduated from Rice University in the United States in 2023. In Iceland, she has been coached by Icelandic Olympian Pétur Guðmundsson.

She won the bronze medal at the 2019 European Athletics U20 Championships in Borås, Sweden, throwing 15.65 meters. In 2021, she threw an Icelandic national record of 16.77 metres and was a finalist at the 2021 European Athletics U23 Championships in Tallinn, Estonia. In August 2022, she threw 16.41 metres whilst competing at the 2022 European Athletics Championships in Munich, Germany but did not advance from the qualifying round.

In February 2023, Gunnarsdóttir improved her own Icelandic indoor record twice; first to 17.70m in Albuquerque, New Mexico and then to 17.92m whilst competing in the United States in Birmingham, Alabama to increase the record by 97 centimetres in a few weeks. In August 2023, she competed at the 2023 World Athletics Championships in Budapest, but did not advance from the qualifying round.

She competed at the 2024 World Athletics Indoor Championships in Glasgow, Scotland. She competed at the 2024 European Athletics Championships in Rome, Italy. With a throw of 17.91m, Gunnarsdóttir improved her Icelandic outdoor national record on 30 June 2024 at the Icelandic Championships in Akureyri. She competed at the 2024 Olympic Games in Paris, France, to become the first female shot putter to represent Iceland at the Games.

She competed at the 2025 European Athletics Indoor Championships in Apeldoorn, Netherlands, placing sixteenth overall. She threw 16.05 metres to win the 2025 European Athletics Team Championships Third Division shot put title in Maribor in June 2025. In September 2025, she competed at the 2025 World Championships in Tokyo, Japan.

In August 2026, she competed at the 2026 European Athletics Championships in Birmingham, England, in the shot put.
