= Vatican City at the 2022 Mediterranean Games =

- National federation: Vatican Athletics
- Website: athleticavaticana.org

in Oran, Algeria 25 June 2022 – 6 July 2022
- Competitors: 1 (1 woman) in 1 sport
- Officials: 2
- Medals: Gold 0 Silver 0 Bronze 0 Total 0

Mediterranean Games appearances (overview)
- 2022; 2026

Vatican City competed as guests at the 2022 Mediterranean Games, which were held in Oran, Algeria, from 25 June to 6 July 2022. The nation's appearance at these games marked its debut in the Mediterranean Games, and its debut in any international multi-sport event. The team consisted of one athlete, long-distance runner Sara Carnicelli, and two officials, undersecretary of the Dicastery for Culture and Education Melchor Sánchez de Toca Alameda and coach and technical director of Vatican Athletics Claudio Carmosino. Middle-distance runner Simone Adamoli was supposed to join the delegation but withdrew before the Games had started.

In 2019, the Vatican Athletics federation had been established by an agreement between the Vatican and the Italian National Olympic Committee to enable possible participation at international sporting tournaments such as the Summer Olympics and Mediterranean Games. Plans to compete at the 2021 Games of the Small States of Europe were halted although the federation was later invited by the Organizing Committee of the 2022 Mediterranean Games to send a guest delegation. There, Carnicelli competed in the women's half marathon and unofficially placed ninth in the event.

== Background ==
Vatican City and the Italian National Olympic Committee (CONI) had an agreement to set up an official athletics team to allow the nation to possibly be represented in international sporting competitions such as the Summer Olympics and Mediterranean Games. Prior to this, delegations from Vatican City were present at the 2016 Summer Olympics and 2018 Winter Olympics as observers. The Vatican Athletics federation was established on 10 January 2019 through the agreement, with initial accredited members that included Swiss Guards, nuns, priests, museum workers, and maintenance workers, as well as two migrant Muslim Africans as honorary members. Although not affiliated with World Athletics, the organization is affiliated with the Italian Athletics Federation. It is the first sports team to have legal status and is the first official sporting association within the nation.

Through Vatican Athletics, a delegation representing the nation was present at the 2019 Games of the Small States of Europe in Budva but was only allowed to observe as they were barred from competing due to the absence of a National Olympic Committee. A team representing the nation were set to compete at the 2021 Games of the Small States of Europe to be held in Andorra la Vella through a partnership with CONI signed in 2018, but the event was cancelled due to the COVID-19 pandemic and to avoid scheduling conflicts with the 2020 Summer Olympics, which were rescheduled to be held in 2021 in Tokyo. Vatican delegations were also present at the 2021 and 2022 editions of the Championships of the Small States of Europe, an athletics competition organized by the Athletic Association of Small States of Europe, albeit in a non-scoring manner as they were invited as guests rather than official participants.

The 2022 Mediterranean Games were originally scheduled to take place from 25 June to 5 July 2021 in Oran, Algeria, but were rescheduled to 25 June to 5 July 2022 due to COVID-19. This edition of the Games marked Vatican City's first appearance at the Mediterranean Games and the first time the nation competed at a multi-sport event, albeit as a guest team.

== Delegation ==
A guest delegation representing Vatican City through Vatican Athletics was invited by the Organizing Committee of the 2022 Mediterranean Games, a decision supported by the president of the International Committee of Mediterranean Games, Davide Tizzano. To compete as a member of Vatican Athletics, athletes had to either be: citizens of the nation, priests or students aspiring to be priests directly connected to the nation, an employee, or the relative of an employee working inside the nation.

Italian runners Simone Adamoli, the son of an employee at the Governor's Palace, and Sara Carnicelli, the daughter of an administrative employee, (Note: Around the Rings states that Carnicelli was eligible to represent the nation through her mother, while L'Osservatore Romano and la Repubblica named her father, Giancarlo Carnicelli, as the reason for her eligibility.) were initially entered as the two athletes of the team. Adamoli and Carnicelli previously represented the nation, competing at different editions of the Championships of the Small States of Europe. Adamoli did not earn a podium finish in his event (Note: Athletes representing Vatican City are listed as their original nationality on World Athletics. In this case, Adamoli is listed as Italian in the official results of the Championships.) though Carnicelli became the first unofficial international medalist for the nation when she won a bronze medal in the women's 5,000 metres. Because of an agreement with the European Athletic Association and the Athletic Association of Small States of Europe, she had to give the bronze medal to Roberta Schembri of Malta, who finished in fourth place; she was then awarded an honorary medal.

Shortly before the beginning of the Games, Adamoli withdrew from his event. This left a final delegation comprising three people: Carnicelli, coach and technical director of Vatican Athletics Claudio Carmosino, and Melchor Sánchez de Toca Alameda, the head of the sports department and undersecretary of the Dicastery for Culture and Education. For her preparations for the women's half marathon at the Games, Carnicelli trained in Cecchignola, Rome, with help from the Centro Sportivo Esercito, as Vatican City did not own adequate sporting facilities. The delegation flew to Oran alongside the Italian delegation through a charter flight provided by ITA Airways.

== Athletics ==
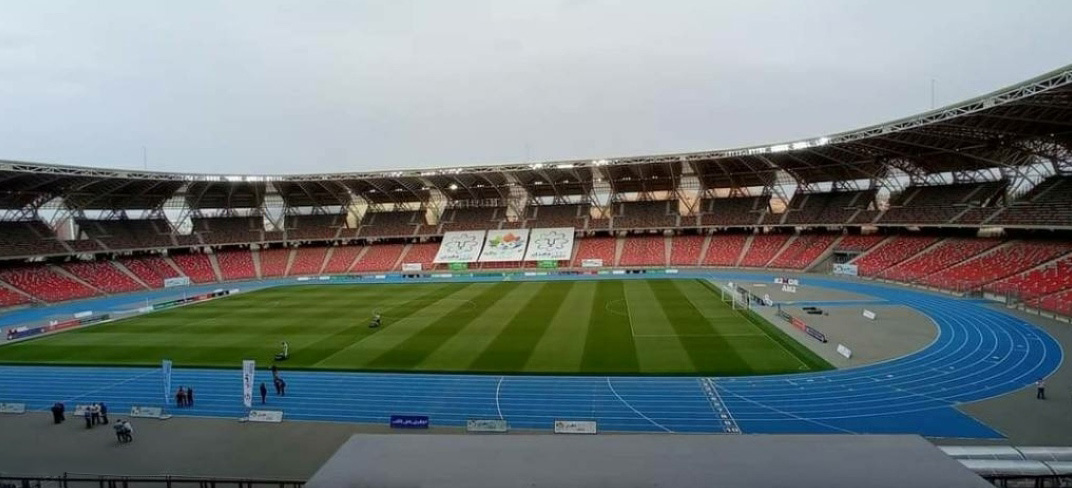
Miloud Hadefi Stadium, the end point of the half marathon races

The half marathon events were held on an urban racing circuit leading up to Miloud Hadefi Stadium, the main venue of the athletics events at the Games. Carnicelli competed in her event at 8:00 a.m. on 30 June against twelve other athletes. She finished with a time of 1:17:21, though her result was not officially recorded, as the nation was invited as a non-scoring competitor. Had the nation been an official participant, she would have placed ninth overall. Giovanna Epis of Italy won the gold medal in the event in a time of 1:13:47.

Key

- DNS = Did not start

Athletics summary
Athlete	Event	Heat		Final	
Athlete	Event	Result	Rank	Result	Rank
Simone Adamoli	—N/a	DNS		—	
Sara Carnicelli	Women's half marathon	—N/a		1:17:21	—N/a

== Legacy ==
In an interview after the Games with Matt Nelsen of Infobae, de Toca commented on the possibility of the nation's integration with the Olympic Movement and likened it to the Holy See's status in the United Nations as a permanent observer state. He further stated that the nation's goal was to participate in international sport with "some significance" outside of competitive play. The sovereign of Vatican City, Pope Francis, thanked the organizers for their invitation of Vatican Athletics. During a Mass held in Oran, he spoke about multiple philosophies of sport such as sports' role in diplomacy and interfaith dialogue.

Carnicelli continued to represent Vatican Athletics until she transferred to the athletics club Imperiali Atletica in 2024. Vatican City was represented by Vatican Athletics at the 2024 Championships of the Small States of Europe in a non-scoring manner. There, Giuseppe Zapparata unofficially placed third in the men's 110 metres hurdles. In future competition, Vatican Athletics had announced a possible participation at the 2026 Mediterranean Games through the Holy See Press Office in 2019.

== See also ==
- Sport in Vatican City
