= 2011 World Youth Championships in Athletics – Girls' medley relay =

Girls' medley relay at the 2011 World Youth Championships in Athletics
- Venue: Stadium Lille Métropole
- Dates: 9 July (heats); 10 July (final)
- Nations: 17
- Winning time: 2:03.42 WYB

Medalists
gold medal	Christania Williams; Shericka Jackson; Chrisann Gordon; Olivia James	Jamaica
silver medal	Jennifer Madu; Bealoved Brown; Kendall Baisden; Robin Reynolds; Myasia Jacobs	United States
bronze medal	Shamelle Pless; Khamica Bingham; Christian Brennan; Sage Watson; Ashley Taylor	Canada

The girls' medley relay at the 2011 World Youth Championships in Athletics was held at the Stadium Lille Métropole on 9 and 10 July.

== Medalists ==
Gold	Silver	Bronze
Jamaica; Christania Williams; Shericka Jackson; Chrisann Gordon; Olivia James	United States; Jennifer Madu; Bealoved Brown; Kendall Baisden; Robin Reynolds; Myasia Jacobs	Canada; Shamelle Pless; Khamica Bingham; Christian Brennan; Sage Watson; Ashley Taylor

== Records ==
Prior to the competition, the following records were as follows.

World Youth Best	United States	2:03.83	Debrecen, Hungary	15 July 2001
Championship Record	United States	2:03.83	Debrecen, Hungary	15 July 2001
World Youth Leading	South Africa	2:13.60	Windhoek, Namibia	29 May 2011

== Heats ==
Qualification rule: first 2 of each heat (Q) plus the 2 fastest times (q) qualified.

=== Heat 1 ===
Rank	Lane	Nation	Athletes	Time	Note
1	6	Russia	Anastasiya Nikolayeva, Ekaterina Renzhina, Anna Parfyonova, Anastasiya Aslanidi	2:08.66	Q, WYL
2	3	Canada	Shamelle Pless, Khamica Bingham, Christian Brennan, Ashley Taylor	2:08.97	Q, PB
3	1	Italy	Maria Paniz, Rebecca Palandri, Ylenia Vitale, Raphaela Lukudo	2:10.83	SB
4	4	Bahamas	Devynne Charlton, Carmiesha Cox, Pedrya Seymour, Gregria Higgs	2:11.10	SB
5	5	Ukraine	Polina Halkina, Oksana Ralko, Kateryna Klymiuk, Olena Sidorska	2:13.11	SB
6	2	China	Lu Shaowen, Li Jingyu, Wang Yuke, Zhou Yanling	2:17.27	SB

=== Heat 2 ===
Rank	Lane	Nation	Athletes	Time	Note
1	6	Jamaica	Christania Williams, Shericka Jackson, Olivia James, Chrisann Gordon	2:05.59	Q, WYL
2	4	Nigeria	Adebusola Adewale, Deborah Oluwaseun Odeyemi, Ada Benjamin, Rita Ossai	2:08.44	Q, PB
3	5	Poland	Kamila Ciba, Katarzyna Siewruk, Aleksandra Maliszewska, Patrycja Wyciszkiewicz	2:08.68	q, PB
4	1	Brazil	Beatriz de Souza, Tamiris de Liz, Julia Schwan, Lourdes Dallazem	2:10.79	SB
5	2	Spain	Ariadna Ramos, Ana Martín-Sacristán, Elvira Vázquez, Bárbara Camblor	2:12.00	PB
6	3	Slovenia	Tina Slejko, Eva Trošt, Dorotea Rebernik, Anja Benko	2:13.17	SB

=== Heat 3 ===
Rank	Lane	Nation	Athletes	Time	Note
1	2	United States	Jennifer Madu, Myasia Jacobs, Kendall Baisden, Robin Reynolds	2:09.39	Q, SB
2	5	Romania	Andreea Grecu, Roxana Ene, Andreea Cojocaru, Bianca Răzor	2:10.33	Q, SB
3	4	South Africa	Liezl Hechter, Philippa Van der Merwe, Stephanie Wicksell, Izelle Neuhoff	2:10.48	q, PB
4	3	Japan	Yumi Nobayashi, Masumi Aoki, Anna Doi, Ayaka Nagura	2:10.54	SB
5	1	France	Solenn Compper, Brigitte Ntiamoah, Emeline Bauwe, Tiguida Diarouma	2:11.77	SB

== Final ==
Rank	Lane	Nation	Athletes	Time	Note
1st place, gold medalist(s)	6	Jamaica	Christania Williams, Shericka Jackson, Chrisann Gordon, Olivia James	2:03.42	WYB
2nd place, silver medalist(s)	4	United States	Jennifer Madu, Bealoved Brown, Kendall Baisden, Robin Reynolds	2:03.92	SB
3rd place, bronze medalist(s)	7	Canada	Shamelle Pless, Khamica Bingham, Christian Brennan, Sage Watson	2:05.72	PB
4	5	Nigeria	Deborah Oluwaseun Odeyemi, Florence Uwakwe, Ada Benjamin, Rita Ossai	2:06.26	PB
5	3	Russia	Anastasiya Nikolayeva, Ekaterina Renzhina, Anna Parfyonova, Anastasiya Aslanidi	2:07.62	SB
6	8	Romania	Andreea Grecu, Roxana Ene, Andreea Cojocaru, Bianca Răzor	2:10.17	SB
7	2	Poland	Kamila Ciba, Katarzyna Siewruk, Aleksandra Maliszewska, Patrycja Wyciszkiewicz	2:10.35	
8	1	South Africa	Liezl Hechter, Philippa Van der Merwe, Stephanie Wicksell, Izelle Neuhoff	2:10.76	
