= 2011 World Youth Championships in Athletics – Girls' 100 metres =

Girls' 100 metres at the 2011 World Youth Championships in Athletics
- Venue: Stadium Lille Métropole
- Dates: 6 July (heats); 7 July (semifinal & final)
- Competitors: 62
- Winning time: 11.57 PB

Medalists
gold medal	Jennifer Madu	United States
silver medal	Myasia Jacobs	United States
bronze medal	Christania Williams	Jamaica

The girls' 100 metres at the 2011 World Youth Championships in Athletics was held at the Stadium Lille Métropole on 6 and 7 July.

== Medalists ==
Gold	Silver	Bronze
Jennifer Madu; United States	Myasia Jacobs; United States	Christania Williams; Jamaica

== Records ==
Prior to the competition, the following records were as follows.

World Youth Best	Chandra Cheeseborough (USA)	11.13	Eugene, USA	21 June 1976
Championship Record	Jessica Onyepunuka (USA)	11.31	Sherbrooke, Canada	11 July 2003
World Youth Leading	Christania Williams (JAM)	11.39	Kingston, Jamaica	19 March 2011

No new records were set during the competition.

== Heats ==
Qualification rule: first 2 of each heat (Q) plus the 8 fastest times (q) qualified.

=== Heat 1 ===
Rank	Lane	Name	Nationality	Time	Notes
1	4	Anna Doi	Japan	11.83	Q
2	6	Philippa van der Merwe	South Africa	11.95	Q
3	5	Chelsea Charles	Trinidad and Tobago	12.19	q
4	3	Rima Kashafutdinova	Kazakhstan	12.38	
5	1	Yagmur Kayik	Turkey	12.50	
6	7	Katia Pozuelo	El Salvador	12.90	
7	2	Megan West	American Samoa	14.44	PB
-	8	Leonela Graciani	Argentina	DNS	

=== Heat 2 ===
Rank	Lane	Name	Nationality	Time	Notes
1	6	Khamica Bingham	Canada	11.72	Q
2	1	Dianna Johnson	Jamaica	11.99	Q
3	3	Ramona van der Vloot	Suriname	12.07	q
4	2	Solenn Compper	France	12.18	q
5	7	Paula Macarena Solís	Argentina	12.65	
6	5	Anna Bulanova	Kyrgyzstan	12.82	
7	8	Maria Speranza Biordi	San Marino	13.74	PB
-	4	Ameilia Gillespie	Cayman Islands	DNF	

=== Heat 3 ===
Rank	Lane	Name	Nationality	Time	Notes
1	1	Galina Nikolova	Bulgaria	11.65	Q, PB
2	4	Annika Drazek	Germany	11.76	Q, PB
3	2	Yanling Zhou	China	12.20	q
4	8	Tina Slejko	Slovenia	12.25	
5	3	Gunta Latiševa-Cudare	Latvia	12.26	PB
6	5	Gina Bass	Gambia	12.44	SB
7	7	Noha Herbert	Saint Kitts and Nevis	12.58	
8	6	Tsitsi Carol Mahachi	Zimbabwe	13.17	PB

=== Heat 4 ===
Rank	Lane	Name	Nationality	Time	Notes
1	2	Myasia Jacobs	United States	11.85	Q
2	1	Onika Murray	Trinidad and Tobago	12.21	Q
3	6	Nediam Vargas	Venezuela	12.27	PB
4	4	Roxana Ene	Romania	12.31	
5	5	Loungo Matlhaku	Botswana	12.35	
6	3	Tímea Varga	Hungary	12.38	
7	8	Samia Nabli	Tunisia	13.42	
8	7	Angeliquea Eora	Nauru	14.13	PB

=== Heat 5 ===
Rank	Lane	Name	Nationality	Time	Notes
1	1	Tamiris de Liz	Brazil	11.84	Q
2	2	Liezl Hechter	South Africa	12.20	Q
3	7	Shamelle Pless	Canada	12.28	
4	3	Celene Cevallos	Ecuador	12.32	
5	4	Sunanda Sarkar	India	12.37	
6	6	Adebusola Adewale	Nigeria	12.50	
7	8	Salome Siradze	Georgia	12.66	PB
8	5	Jana Malbrook	Seychelles	13.03	PB

=== Heat 6 ===
Rank	Lane	Name	Nationality	Time	Notes
1	1	Christania Williams	Jamaica	11.66	Q
2	3	Devynne Charlton	Bahamas	12.03	Q
3	2	Matilde Álvarez	Mexico	12.14	q
4	4	Lucy Fortune	Grenada	12.19	q, PB
5	7	Akshana Maralanda	Sri Lanka	12.32	SB
6	6	Ema Kalenská	Slovakia	12.72	
-	5	Hatice Öztürk	Turkey	DQ	

=== Heat 7 ===
Rank	Lane	Name	Nationality	Time	Notes
1	2	Deborah Oluwaseun Odeyemi	Nigeria	11.84	Q
2	7	Kamila Ciba	Poland	12.04	Q
3	3	Stella Akakpo	France	12.15	q
4	6	Gregria Higgs	Bahamas	12.26	
5	1	Diana Khubeseryan	Armenia	12.64	
6	5	Charifa Labarang	Cameroon	12.83	
-	4	Kadecia Baird	Guyana	DNS	

=== Heat 8 ===
Rank	Lane	Name	Nationality	Time	Notes
1	6	Jennifer Madu	United States	11.79	Q
2	3	Julia Schwan	Brazil	12.04	Q
3	7	Yumi Nobayashi	Japan	12.11	q
4	8	Supawan Thipat	Thailand	12.37	
5	1	Nina Prudnikova	Kazakhstan	12.54	
6	4	Andreea Grecu	Romania	12.74	
7	5	Valbona Selimi	Macedonia	13.25	
8	2	Reylynn Sapong	Northern Mariana Islands	14.25	PB

== Semifinals ==
Qualification rule: first 2 of each heat (Q) plus the 2 fastest times (q) qualified.

=== Heat 1 ===
Rank	Lane	Name	Nationality	Time	Notes
1	4	Christania Williams	Jamaica	11.72	Q
2	6	Myasia Jacobs	United States	11.84	Q
3	5	Anna Doi	Japan	12.24	
4	7	Julian Schwan	Brazil	12.29	
5	3	Devynne Charlton	Bahamas	12.33	
6	2	Stella Akakpo	France	12.40	
7	8	Ramona van der Vloot	Suriname	12.43	
8	1	Chelsea Charles	Trinidad and Tobago	12.49	

=== Heat 2 ===
Rank	Lane	Name	Nationality	Time	Notes
1	6	Jennifer Madu	United States	11.71	Q
2	3	Khamica Bingham	Canada	11.89	Q
3	5	Annika Drazek	Germany	12.05	q
4	8	Kamila Ciba	Poland	12.05	q
5	4	Philippa van der Merwe	South Africa	12.14	
6	1	Solenn Compper	France	12.24	
7	7	Onika Murray	Trinidad and Tobago	12.29	
8	2	Lucy Fortune	Grenada	12.45	

=== Heat 3 ===
Rank	Lane	Name	Nationality	Time	Notes
1	3	Galina Nikolova	Bulgaria	11.83	Q
2	4	Tamiris de Liz	Brazil	11.92	Q
3	6	Deborah Oluwaseun Odeyemi	Nigeria	12.09	
4	5	Dianna Johnson	Jamaica	12.11	
5	2	Matilde Álvarez	Mexico	12.36	
6	1	Yanling Zhou	China	12.46	
7	7	Liezl Hechter	South Africa	12.47	
-	8	Yumi Nobayashi	Japan	DQ	

== Final ==
Rank	Lane	Name	Nationality	Time	Notes
1st place, gold medalist(s)	4	Jennifer Madu	United States	11.57	PB
2nd place, silver medalist(s)	5	Myasia Jacobs	United States	11.61	
3rd place, bronze medalist(s)	3	Christania Williams	Jamaica	11.63	
4	6	Galina Nikolova	Bulgaria	11.68	
5	7	Khamica Bingham	Canada	11.71	
6	8	Tamiris de Liz	Brazil	11.73	PB
7	1	Annika Drazek	Germany	11.92	
8	2	Kamila Ciba	Poland	12.00	
