= Vatican City at the 2026 Mediterranean Games =

- National federation: Vatican Athletics
- Website: athleticavaticana.org

in Taranto, Italy 21 August 2026 – 3 September 2026
- Competitors: 4 (4 men) in 3 sports
- Medals: Gold 0 Silver 0 Bronze 0 Total 0

Mediterranean Games appearances (overview)
- 2022; 2026

The Vatican City is competed as guests at the 2026 Mediterranean Games, which were held from 21 August to 3 September 2026 in Taranto, Italy.

== Cycling ==
=== Road ===
Athlete	Event	Time	Rank
Emiliano Morbidelli	Men's road race	DNF	

== Fencing ==
Men's

Athlete	Event	Group Stage		Round of 16	Quarterfinal	Semifinal	Final / BM	
Athlete	Event	Opposition Score	Rank	Opposition Score	Opposition Score	Opposition Score	Opposition Score	Rank
Daniele Fontana	Épée	Mohsen (EGY) L 3–5; Frazão (POR) L 5–3; Damjanoski (MKD) L 5–3; El-Chemali (LBN) L 5–4; Tzovanis (GRE) L 5–0	6	Did not advance				

== Padel ==
Athlete	Event	Round of 32	Round of 16	Quarterfinals	Semifinals	Final / BM	
Athlete	Event	Opposition Score	Opposition Score	Opposition Score	Opposition Score	Opposition Score	Rank
Tiziano Lucarelli; Fabrizio Peloni	Men's doubles	Hussein / Wakim (EGY); L 6–0, 6–0	Did not advance				
