= Sara Carnicelli =

Italian runner (born 1994)

Personal information
- Nationality: Italian
- Born: 31 October 1994 (age 31)

Sport
- Country: Vatican City
- Sport: Athletics
- Events: Middle-distance running, long distance running, steeplechase

Achievements and titles
- Personal bests: 800 m: 2:22.11; 1000 m: 3:02.92; 1500 m: 4:35.31; 3000 m: 9:44.95; 5000 m: 17:07.01; 10,000 m: 36:06.35; 3000 m steeplechase: 10:33.61; Half marathon: 1:17:21
Medal record
Women's athletics
Representing Vatican City
Event	1st	2nd	3rd
Championships of the Small States of Europe	0	0	1^{1}
Total	0	0	0
Championships of the Small States of Europe
Bronze medal – third place	2022 Marsa	5000 m^{1}

Sara Carnicelli (born 31 October 1994) is an Italian middle and long-distance runner competing for Vatican City.

== Career ==
Carnicelli started competing in 2010 as a youth athlete. Wearing the colours of Vatican City, she was the first female finisher of the Stracittadina event at the Run to Rome Marathon in 2019.

In 2022, Carnicelli competed for the Vatican City alongside her compatriot Emiliano Morbidelli, at the 2022 Championships of the Small States of Europe in the women's 5000 m. She finished third and, as she participated in a "non-scoring" manner, was awarded an honorary bronze medal. She then participated at the Mediterranean Games in Oran, Algeria, once again competing in a "non-scoring" manner. She would have finished in ninth place if she had competed in a "scoring" manner.

She continued to compete in races throughout Italy in the colours of the Vatican City. She won the Talenti Run on 26 March 2023, held in the vicinity of the Parco Talenti in Rome over 10 km, in a time of 35:24. That month, she won the 10 km road race, Vola Ciampino, in Ciampino, Italy, in a time of 36:10. In September 2023, she won the TraninCorsa Half Marathon in Italy, in a time of 1:21:02. In 2023 and 2024, she won the Dogi's Half Marathon, finishing in Venice, Italy.

== Personal life ==
Carnicelli is from the district of Lazio region of Italy. She is eligible to represent the Vatican through her parents. Around the Rings states that Carnicelli was eligible to represent the nation through her mother, an administrative worker at the Vatican, while L'Osservatore Romano and la Repubblica named her father Giancarlo Carnicelli, a Vatican official, as the reason for her eligibility.

== Competition record ==
Year	Competition	Venue	Position	Event	Notes
Representing the Vatican City
Unofficial results
2022	Championships of the Small States of Europe	Marsa, Malta	3rd^{1}^{2}	5,000 m	17:09.77
2022	Mediterranean Games	Oran, Algeria	9th^{2}	Half marathon	1:17:21

== Notes ==
^1 Honorary medal.
^2 Non-scoring manner, not official ranking.
