= Roberto Rigali =

Italian sprinter

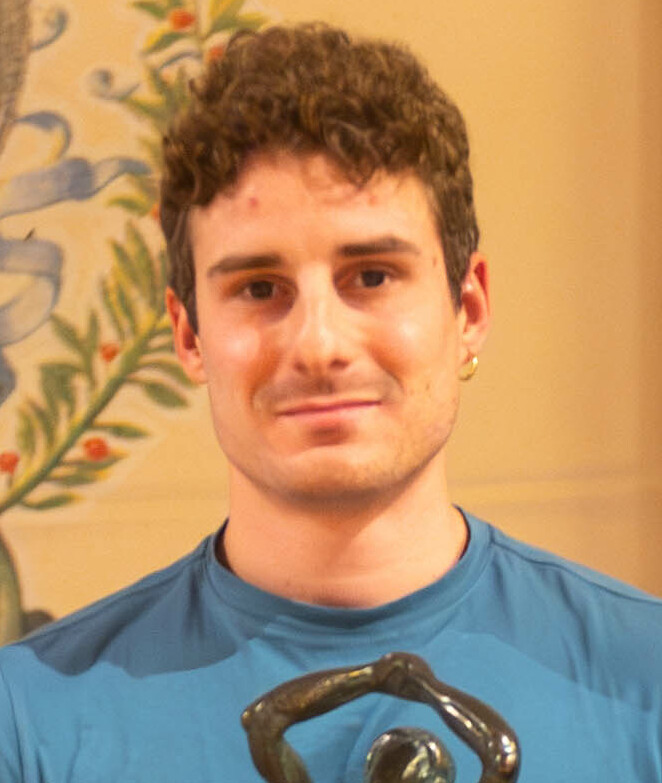
- Rigali in 2023

Personal information
- National team: Italy
- Born: 7 January 1995 (age 31) Esine, Italy
- Height: 1.83 m (6 ft 0 in)
- Weight: 79 kg (174 lb)

Sport
- Sport: Athletics
- Event: Sprinting
- Club: Bergamo Stars Atletica
- Coached by: Alberto Barbera

Achievements and titles
- Personal best: 100 m: 10.25 (Modena 2023)
Medal record
Men's athletics
Representing Italy
World Championships
Silver medal – second place	2023 Budapest	4 × 100 m relay
European Championships
Gold medal – first place	2024 Rome	4 × 100 m relay
Mediterranean Games
Gold medal – first place	2022 Oran	4 × 100 m relay

Roberto Rigali (born 7 January 1995) is an Italian sprinter.

== Achievements ==
Year	Competition	Venue	Rank	Event	Time	Notes
2022	Mediterranean Games	(Algeria) Oran	1st	4 × 100 m relay	38.95	SB
2025	World Relays	(China) Guangzhou	5th	4 × 100 m mixed relay	41.25	

== See also ==
- Italian national track relay team
