= Athletics at the 2022 Mediterranean Games =

2022 Athletics at the Mediterranean Games

- Dates: 30 June – 3 July
- Host city: Oran, Algeria
- Venue: Miloud Hadefi Stadium
- Events: 38
- Participation: 413 athletes from 26 nations

The athletics competitions at the 2022 Mediterranean Games in Oran, Algeria took place between 30 June and 3 July at the Oran Olympic Stadium.

== Medal table ==
* Host nation (Algeria)

Rank	Nation	Gold	Silver	Bronze	Total
1	Turkey	7	5	3	15
2	Italy	5	6	7	18
3	Algeria*	5	2	6	13
4	France	4	5	4	13
5	Portugal	3	2	3	8
6	Serbia	3	2	0	5
7	Morocco	2	6	5	13
8	Cyprus	2	2	2	6
9	Egypt	2	2	1	5
10	Slovenia	1	2	0	3
11	Croatia	1	1	0	2
12	Spain	1	0	3	4
13	Montenegro	1	0	1	2
14	Albania	1	0	0	1
15	Greece	0	1	3	4
16	Syria	0	1	0	1
16	Tunisia	0	1	0	1
Totals (17 entries)		38	38	38	114

== Medal summary ==
=== Men's events ===
Event	Gold		Silver		Bronze	
100 metres (wind: +0.9 m/s)	Jak Ali Harvey; Turkey	10.15 SB	Ramil Guliyev; Turkey	10.16 SB	Ioannis Nifadopoulos; Greece	10.28 PB
200 metres (wind: +0.8 m/s)	Ramil Guliyev; Turkey	20.21 SB	Diego Pettorossi; Italy	20.65	Daniel Rodríguez; Spain	20.78
400 metres	João Coelho; Portugal	45.41 PB	Hamza Dair; Morocco	45.65 PB	Abdennour Bendjemaa; Algeria	46.06 PB
800 metres	Djamel Sejati; Algeria	1:44.52	Yassine Hethat; Algeria	1:44.79	Catalin Tecuceanu; Italy	1:44.97 SB
1500 metres	Azeddine Habz; France	3:41.65	Abdelatif Sadiki; Morocco	3:42.00	Ossama Meslek; Italy	3:42.49
5000 metres	Soufiyan Bouqantar; Morocco	13:36.12	Mohamed Fares; Morocco	13:36.85	Italo Quazzola; Italy	13:37.63 PB
110 metres hurdles	Milan Trajkovic; Cyprus	13.34	Amine Bouanani; Algeria	13.38 NR	Enrique Llopis; Spain	13.47 SB
400 metres hurdles	Yasmani Copello; Turkey	48.27 GR, SB	Ludvy Vaillant; France	48.83 SB	Abdelmalik Lahoulou; Algeria	48.87 SB
3000 metres steeplechase	Bilal Tabti; Algeria	8:22.79	Mohamed Tindouft; Morocco	8:23.85	Hichem Bouchicha; Algeria	8:23.95
4 × 100 metres relay	Italy; Andrea Federici; Matteo Melluzzo; Diego Pettorossi; Roberto Rigali	38.95 SB	Turkey; Ertan Özkan; Jak Ali Harvey; Kayhan Özer; Ramil Guliyev	38.98 SB	France; Jerry Leconte; Jérémy Leroux; Yanis Ammour; Dylan Vermont	39.05
4 × 400 metres relay	Algeria; Abdennour Bendjemaa; Mohamed Ali Gouaned; Abdelmalik Lahoulou; Slimane Moula	3:03.41	Italy; Pietro Pivotto; Giuseppe Leonardi; Lapo Bianciardi; Matteo Raimondi	3:04.55	Turkey; Oğuzhan Kaya; Yasmani Copello; Sinan Ören; İsmail Nezir	3:04.55
Half marathon	Mouhcine Outalha; Morocco	1:04:05	Benjamin Choquert; France	1:04:19	Soufiyan Bouqantar; Morocco	1:04:57
High jump	Bilel Afer; Algeria	2.24 m PB	Majd Eddin Ghazal; Syria	2.22 m	Hichem Bouhanoun; Algeria	2.22 m PB
Pole vault	Ersu Şaşma; Turkey	5.75 m GR	Anthony Ammirati; France	5.65 m	Ioannis Rizos; Greece	5.60 m PB
Long jump	Augustin Bey; France	7.99 m	Lazar Anić; Serbia	7.83 m SB	Yasser Triki; Algeria	7.80 m SB
Triple jump	Yasser Triki; Algeria	17.07 m SB	Tobia Bocchi; Italy	16.93 m SB	Tiago Pereira; Portugal	16.90 m SB
Shot put	Armin Sinančević; Serbia	21.29 m GR, SB	Asmir Kolašinac; Serbia	20.37 m	Mohamed Magdi Hamza; Egypt	20.35 m
Discus throw	Apostolos Parellis; Cyprus	63.59 m	Martin Marković; Croatia	62.49 m	Danijel Furtula; Montenegro	61.74 m
Hammer throw	Özkan Baltacı; Turkey	74.34 m	Alexandros Poursanidis; Cyprus	73.71 m SB	Giorgio Olivieri; Italy	72.18 m
Javelin throw	Leandro Ramos; Portugal	82.23 m	Ihab Abdelrahman; Egypt	78.51 m	Felise Vaha'i Sosaia; France	76.45 m

=== Women's events ===
Event	Gold		Silver		Bronze	
100 metres (wind: +0.5 m/s)	Basant Hemida; Egypt	11.10 GR	Lorène Bazolo; Portugal	11.36	Olivia Fotopoulou; Cyprus	11.42
200 metres (wind: +0.9 m/s)	Basant Hemida; Egypt	22.47 GR, NR	Olivia Fotopoulou; Cyprus	23.01	Lorène Bazolo; Portugal	23.20
400 metres	Cátia Azevedo; Portugal	51.24 SB	Anita Horvat; Slovenia	51.94 SB	Virginia Troiani; Italy	53.14
800 metres	Ekaterina Guliyev; Turkey	2:01.08 SB	Eloisa Coiro; Italy	2:01.40 PB	Assia Raziki; Morocco	2:01.44 PB
1500 metres	Aurore Fleury; France	4:13.03	Federica Del Buono; Italy	4:13.09	Ludovica Cavalli; Italy	4:13.37
5000 metres	Yasemin Can; Turkey	15:23.47	Rahma Tahiri; Morocco	15:56.36	Leila Hadji; France	16:05.54
100 metres hurdles	Solenn Compper; France	12.92 PB	Nicla Mosetti; Italy	13.22	Elisavet Pesiridou; Greece	13.23
400 metres hurdles	Rebecca Sartori; Italy	55.75	Camille Seri; France	56.01	Noura Ennadi; Morocco	56.45 PB
3000 metres steeplechase	Luiza Gega; Albania	9:14.29 GR, NR	Marwa Bouzayani; Tunisia	9:29.11	Ikram Ouaaziz; Morocco	9:32.87 PB
4 × 100 metres relay	Italy; Irene Siragusa; Gloria Hooper; Aurora Berton; Johanelis Herrera Abreu	43.68	France; Mallory Leconte; Éloïse de la Taille; Gémima Joseph; Wided Atatou	44.63	Cyprus; Dafni Georgiou; Marianna Pisiara; Filippa Fotopoulou; Olivia Fotopoulou	45.10
4 × 400 metres relay	Italy; Anna Polinari; Virginia Troiani; Raphaela Lukudo; Giancarla Trevisan	3:29.93	Slovenia; Agata Zupin; Jerneja Smonkar; Maja Pogorevc; Anita Horvat	3:31.51	Turkey; Şevval Ayaz; Ekaterina Guliyev; Tuğba Toptaş; Büşra Yıldırım	3:43.13
Half marathon	Giovanna Epis; Italy	1:13:47	Hanane Qallouj; Morocco	1:13:53	Rkia El Moukim; Morocco	1:14:05
High jump	Marija Vuković; Montenegro	1.92 m	Tatiana Gusin; Greece	1.90 m SB	Marta Morara; Italy	1.87 m PB
Long jump	Milica Gardašević; Serbia	6.67 m	Esraa Owis; Egypt	6.54 m	Evelise Veiga; Portugal	6.54 m
Triple jump	Neja Filipič; Slovenia	14.15 m	Tuğba Danışmaz; Turkey	14.05 m	Tessy Ebosele; Spain	13.63 m
Discus throw	Marija Tolj; Croatia	64.71 m	Liliana Cá; Portugal	63.62 m	Özlem Becerek; Turkey	61.96 m NU23R
Hammer throw	Laura Redondo; Spain	69.97 m	Kıvılcım Kaya; Turkey	69.82 m SB	Zouina Bouzebra; Algeria	65.45 m PB
Javelin throw	Adriana Vilagoš; Serbia	60.22 m	Eda Tuğsuz; Turkey	59.30 m SB	Alizée Minard; France	56.22 m

== Participating nations ==
- Albania (2)
- Algeria (50)
- Andorra (4)
- Bosnia and Herzegovina (7)
- Croatia (6)
- Cyprus (22)
- Egypt (11)
- France (53)
- Greece (21)
- Italy (65)
- Kosovo (4)
- Libya (3)
- Malta (9)
- Monaco (2)
- Montenegro (2)
- Morocco (29)
- North Macedonia (3)
- Portugal (20)
- San Marino (5)
- Serbia (9)
- Slovenia (12)
- Spain (25)
- Syria (1)
- Tunisia (9)
- Turkey (38)
- Vatican City (1)

== Men's results ==
=== 100 metres ===
Heats – 30 June
Wind:
Heat 1: +0.6 m/s, Heat 2: +0.4 m/s

Rank	Heat	Name	Nationality	Time	Notes
1	2	Jak Ali Harvey	Turkey	10.22	Q
2	2	Ramil Guliyev	Turkey	10.24	Q
3	2	Ioannis Nifadopoulos	Greece	10.34	Q
4	1	Matteo Melluzzo	Italy	10.36	Q
5	1	Sergio López Barranco	Spain	10.38	Q
6	2	Roberto Rigali	Italy	10.41	q
7	1	Youcef Sahel	Algeria	10.42	Q
8	2	Francesco Sansovini	San Marino	10.49	q
9	1	Delvis Santos	Portugal	10.50	
10	1	Konstadinos Zikos	Greece	10.54	
11	2	Skander Djamil Athmani	Algeria	10.56	
12	2	Hajrudin Vejzović	Bosnia and Herzegovina	10.60	
13	1	Chakir Machmour	Morocco	10.61	
14	2	Edhem Vikalo	Bosnia and Herzegovina	10.64	
15	1	Alex Beechey	Cyprus	10.81	
15	2	Francesco Molinari	San Marino	10.81	
17	1	Steve Camilleri	Malta	11.28	
18	2	Kylian Vatrican	Monaco	11.50	
	1	Ahmed Amaar	Libya	DNF	

Final – 30 June

Wind: +0.9 m/s

Rank	Lane	Name	Nationality	Time	Notes
1st place, gold medalist(s)	6	Jak Ali Harvey	Turkey	10.15	SB
2nd place, silver medalist(s)	5	Ramil Guliyev	Turkey	10.16	SB
3rd place, bronze medalist(s)	7	Ioannis Nifadopoulos	Greece	10.28	PB
4	3	Matteo Melluzzo	Italy	10.28	
5	4	Sergio López Barranco	Spain	10.33	
6	2	Roberto Rigali	Italy	10.39	
7	8	Youcef Sahel	Algeria	10.43	
8	1	Francesco Sansovini	San Marino	10.48	

=== 200 metres ===
Heats – 2 July
Wind:
Heat 1: +0.9 m/s, Heat 2: +0.9 m/s

Rank	Heat	Name	Nationality	Time	Notes
1	1	Diego Pettorossi	Italy	20.55	Q
2	2	Ramil Guliyev	Turkey	20.74	Q
3	1	Chakir Machmour	Morocco	20.77	Q, PB
4	1	Daniel Rodríguez	Spain	20.86	Q
5	2	Andrea Federici	Italy	21.05	Q
6	2	Panagiotis Trivyzas	Greece	21.08	Q
7	1	Delvis Santos	Portugal	21.14	q
8	1	Stavros Avgoustinou	Cyprus	21.22	q, PB
9	1	Youcef Sahel	Algeria	21.27	
10	2	Jure Grkman	Slovenia	21.44	
11	2	Ioannis Kariofyllis	Greece	21.46	
12	2	Alexander Beechy	Cyprus	21.57	
13	1	Ahmed Amaar	Libya	21.63	
	2	Skander Djamil Athmani	Algeria	DNS	
	2	Jak Ali Harvey	Turkey	DNS	

Final – 3 July

Wind: +0.8 m/s

Rank	Lane	Name	Nationality	Time	Notes
1st place, gold medalist(s)	6	Ramil Guliyev	Turkey	20.21	SB
2nd place, silver medalist(s)	5	Diego Pettorossi	Italy	20.65	
3rd place, bronze medalist(s)	7	Daniel Rodríguez	Spain	20.78	
4	3	Chakir Machmour	Morocco	20.94	
5	8	Panagiotis Trivyzas	Greece	20.99	
6	2	Delvis Santos	Portugal	21.06	
7	4	Andrea Federici	Italy	21.25	
8	1	Stavros Avgoustinou	Cyprus	21.55	

=== 400 metres ===
Heats – 1 July

Rank	Heat	Name	Nationality	Time	Notes
1	3	João Coelho	Portugal	45.53	Q
2	1	Mohamed Fares Jlassi	Tunisia	45.94	Q
3	3	Franko Burraj	Albania	46.26	Q
4	2	Hamza Dair	Morocco	46.29	Q
5	1	Iñaki Cañal	Spain	46.31	Q
6	1	Lapo Bianciardi	Italy	46.33	q
7	3	Abdennour Bendjemaa	Algeria	46.33	q
8	3	Christopher Naliali	France	46.56	
9	3	Rachid M'Hamdi	Morocco	46.59	
10	2	Es Saddik Hammouni Anas	Algeria	46.65	Q
11	2	Giuseppe Leonardi	Italy	47.01	
12	1	Jovan Stojoski	North Macedonia	47.07	
13	1	Sinan Ören	Turkey	47.10	
14	2	Oǧuzhan Kaya	Turkey	47.43	
15	2	Rami Balti	Tunisia	47.76	
16	2	Mateo Ružić	Croatia	47.79	
17	1	Ahmed Essabai	Libya	52.49	
	3	Jakov Vuković	Croatia	DNS	

Final – 2 July

Rank	Lane	Name	Nationality	Time	Notes
1st place, gold medalist(s)	3	João Coelho	Portugal	45.41	PB
2nd place, silver medalist(s)	6	Hamza Dair	Morocco	45.65	PB
3rd place, bronze medalist(s)	2	Abdennour Bendjemaa	Algeria	46.06	PB
4	5	Franko Burraj	Albania	46.16	NR
5	7	Iñaki Cañal	Spain	46.44	
6	8	Es Saddik Hammouni Anas	Algeria	46.77	
7	1	Lapo Bianciardi	Italy	47.02	
	4	Mohamed Fares Jlassi	Tunisia	DNF	

=== 800 metres ===
Heats – 1 July

Rank	Heat	Name	Nationality	Time	Notes
1	2	Djamel Sejati	Algeria	1:46.39	Q
2	2	Abdelati El Guesse	Morocco	1:46.57	Q
3	2	Simone Barontini	Italy	1:46.89	q
4	2	Riadh Chninni	Tunisia	1:47.00	q
5	1	Catalin Tecuceanu	Italy	1:47.10	Q
6	1	Abdessalem Ayouni	Tunisia	1:47.18	Q
7	1	Abedin Mujezinović	Bosnia and Herzegovina	1:47.23	
8	1	Mostafa Smaili	Morocco	1:47.80	
9	2	Alberto Guerrero	Spain	1:47.82	
10	1	Christos Kotitsas	Greece	1:48.03	
11	1	Ludovic Le Meur	France	1:48.79	
12	2	Charidimos Xenidakis	Greece	1:48.83	
13	3	Yassine Hethat	Algeria	1:49.05	Q
14	3	José Carlos Pinto	Portugal	1:49.31	Q
15	3	Pol Moya	Andorra	1:49.39	
16	3	Salih Toksöz	Turkey	1:50.05	
17	3	Astrit Kryeziu	Kosovo	1:50.57	
18	1	Christos Dimitriou	Cyprus	1:51.18	
19	3	Sacha Cultru	France	1:51.50	
20	3	Karlo Videka	Croatia	1:52.17	
21	2	Ben Micallef	Malta	1:58.18	

Final – 3 July

Rank	Name	Nationality	Time	Notes
1st place, gold medalist(s)	Djamel Sejati	Algeria	1:44.52	
2nd place, silver medalist(s)	Yassine Hethat	Algeria	1:44.79	
3rd place, bronze medalist(s)	Catalin Tecuceanu	Italy	1:44.97	SB
4	Abdessalem Ayouni	Tunisia	1:44.99	SB
5	Riadh Chninni	Tunisia	1:45.46	PB
6	Simone Barontini	Italy	1:45.92	PB
7	Abdelati El Guesse	Morocco	1:46.28	
8	José Carlos Pinto	Portugal	1:46.73	

=== 1500 metres ===
2 July

Rank	Name	Nationality	Time	Notes
1st place, gold medalist(s)	Azeddine Habz	France	3:41.65	
2nd place, silver medalist(s)	Abdellatif Sadiki	Morocco	3:42.00	
3rd place, bronze medalist(s)	Ossama Meslek	Italy	3:42.49	
4	Pietro Arese	Italy	3:42.80	
5	Pol Moya	Andorra	3:43.58	
6	Riadh Chninni	Tunisia	3:43.64	
7	Salim Keddar	Algeria	3:44.18	
8	Mohamed Amine Drabli	Algeria	3:45.14	
9	Abderrahman El Khayami	Spain	3:45.25	
10	Elzan Bibić	Serbia	3:45.42	
11	Stefan Ćuković	Bosnia and Herzegovina	3:50.33	
12	Nahuel Carabaña	Andorra	3:51.89	
13	Ramazan Barbaros	Turkey	3:53.55	
14	Alaa Algorni	Libya	3:53.88	PB
	Abdessalem Ayouni	Tunisia	DQ	
	Elhassane Moujahid	Morocco	DNF	
	Julian Ranc	France	DNS	

=== 5000 metres ===
3 July

Rank	Name	Nationality	Time	Notes
1st place, gold medalist(s)	Soufiyan Bouqantar	Morocco	13:36.12	
2nd place, silver medalist(s)	Mohamed Fares	Morocco	13:36.85	
3rd place, bronze medalist(s)	Italo Quazzola	Italy	13:37.63	PB
4	Aras Kaya	Turkey	13:44.67	
5	Samuel Barata	Portugal	13:47.09	
6	Mohammed Merbouhi	Algeria	13:49.54	
7	Ali Guerine	Algeria	13:54.35	
8	Dario Ivanovski	North Macedonia	13:54.58	PB
9	Dario De Caro	Italy	13:56.63	
10	Marios Anagnostou	Greece	14:17.20	SB
11	Mehdi Frère	France	14:40.13	
12	Simon Bedard	France	14:51.20	
	Ramazan Barbaros	Turkey	DNF	
	Ahmed Jaziri	Tunisia	DNS	

=== Half marathon ===
1 July

Rank	Name	Nationality	Time	Notes
1st place, gold medalist(s)	Mohcin Outalha	Morocco	1:04:05	
2nd place, silver medalist(s)	Benjamin Choquert	France	1:04:19	
3rd place, bronze medalist(s)	Soufiyan Bouqantar	Morocco	1:04:57	
4	Sezgin Ataç	Turkey	1:05:02	
5	Amine Khadiri	Cyprus	1:06:18	
6	Nabil El Hannachi	Algeria	1:07:06	
7	El Hadi Laameuch	Algeria	1:07:24	
8	Yoann Kowal	France	1:09:34	
9	Geoffrey Le Dean	France	1:10:31	
10	Dillon Cassar	Malta	1:14:41	
	Rabah Aboud	Algeria	DNF	
	Atef Saad	Tunisia	DNF	
	Ramazan Özdemir	Turkey	DNF	

=== 110 metres hurdles ===
Heats – 2 July
Wind:
Heat 1: +0.7 m/s, Heat 2: -0.4 m/s

Rank	Heat	Name	Nationality	Time	Notes
1	1	Milan Trajkovic	Cyprus	13.32	Q, GR, SB
2	1	Mikdat Sevler	Turkey	13.40	Q, NR
3	2	Amine Bouanani	Algeria	13.44	Q, NR
4	2	Enrique Llopis	Spain	13.52	Q
5	1	Daniel Cisneros	Spain	13.53	Q
6	2	Filip Jakob Demšar	Slovenia	13.65	Q, PB
7	2	Lorenzo Ndele Simonelli	Italy	13.72	q
8	1	Francesco Ferrante	Italy	13.88	q
9	2	João Vítor de Oliveira	Portugal	13.92	
10	1	Hrvoje Čukman	Croatia	14.05	
11	1	Abdel Kader Larrinaga	Portugal	14.06	
12	2	Yousouf Badawy Sayed	Egypt	14.19	
13	1	Daniel Saliba	Malta	15.05	
	2	Raphael Mohamed	France	DNS	

Final – 3 July

Wind: +0.3 m/s

Rank	Lane	Name	Nationality	Time	Notes
1st place, gold medalist(s)	3	Milan Trajkovic	Cyprus	13.34	
2nd place, silver medalist(s)	4	Amine Bouanani	Algeria	13.38	NR
3rd place, bronze medalist(s)	6	Enrique Llopis	Spain	13.47	SB
4	5	Mikdat Sevler	Turkey	13.57	
5	1	Lorenzo Ndele Simonelli	Italy	13.59	
6	7	Filip Jakob Demšar	Slovenia	13.72	
7	8	Daniel Cisneros	Spain	13.98	
8	2	Francesco Ferrante	Italy	14.27	

=== 400 metres hurdles ===
Heats – 30 June

Rank	Heat	Name	Nationality	Time	Notes
1	2	Ludvy Vaillant	France	49.07	Q
2	2	Yasmani Copello	Turkey	49.08	Q
3	2	Abdelmalik Lahoulou	Algeria	49.30	Q
4	1	José Reynaldo Bencosme de Leon	Italy	49.55	Q
5	1	İsmail Nezir	Turkey	49.59	Q
6	2	Mario Lambrughi	Italy	50.32	q
7	1	Saber Boukmouche	Algeria	50.38	Q
8	1	Mohamed Amine Touati	Tunisia	50.55	q
9	1	Ismail Manyani	Morocco	51.45	
10	1	Aleix Porras	Spain	51.90	
11	2	Andrea Ercolani Volta	San Marino	52.35	
12	2	Rusmir Malkočević	Bosnia and Herzegovina	53.27	
	1	Saad Hinti	Morocco	DNS	
	2	Muhammad Kounta	France	DNS	

Final – 1 July

Rank	Lane	Name	Nationality	Time	Notes
1st place, gold medalist(s)	5	Yasmani Copello	Turkey	48.27	SB
2nd place, silver medalist(s)	3	Ludvy Vaillant	France	48.83	SB
3rd place, bronze medalist(s)	8	Abdelmalik Lahoulou	Algeria	48.87	SB
4	6	José Reynaldo Bencosme de Leon	Italy	48.91	PB
5	2	Mario Lambrughi	Italy	49.29	
6	7	Saber Boukmouche	Algeria	50.01	
7	4	İsmail Nezir	Turkey	50.09	PB
8	1	Mohamed Amine Touati	Tunisia	50.13	SB

=== 3000 metres steeplechase ===
30 June

Rank	Name	Nationality	Time	Notes
1st place, gold medalist(s)	Bilal Tabti	Algeria	8:22.79	
2nd place, silver medalist(s)	Mohamed Tindouft	Morocco	8:23.85	
3rd place, bronze medalist(s)	Hichem Bouchicha	Algeria	8:23.95	
4	Ahmed Jaziri	Tunisia	8:24.31	
5	Abderrafia Bouassel	Morocco	8:29.59	
6	Hilal Yego	Turkey	8:33.43	
7	Gatien Airiau	France	8:34.12	
8	Mohamed Amin Jhinaoui	Tunisia	8:35.32	
9	Alejandro Quijada	Spain	8:36.69	
10	Etson Barros	Portugal	8:37.57	
11	Giovanni Gatto	Italy	8:46.77	
12	Clement Duigou	France	8:52.68	
	Georgios Stamoulis	Greece	DNF	

=== 4 × 100 metres relay ===
1 July

Rank	Lane	Nation	Competitors	Time	Notes
1st place, gold medalist(s)	4	Italy	Andrea Federici, Matteo Melluzzo, Diego Pettorossi, Roberto Rigali	38.95	
2nd place, silver medalist(s)	6	Turkey	Ertan Özkan, Jak Ali Harvey, Kayhan Özer, Ramil Guliyev	38.98	
3rd place, bronze medalist(s)	5	France	Jerry Leconte, Jérémy Leroux, Yanis Ammour, Dylan Vermont	39.08	
4	7	Greece	Konstadinos Zikos, Nikolaos Panagiotopoulos, Panagiotis Trivyzas, Ioannis Nyfantopoulos	39.10	
	3	Morocco		DNS	

=== 4 × 400 metres relay ===
3 July

Rank	Lane	Nation	Competitors	Time	Notes
1st place, gold medalist(s)	8	Algeria	Abdennour Bendjemaa, Mohamed Ali Gouaned, Abdelmalik Lahoulou, Slimane Moula	3:03.41	
2nd place, silver medalist(s)	6	Italy	Pietro Pivotto, Giuseppe Leonardi, Lapo Bianciardi, Matteo Raimondi	3:04.55	
3rd place, bronze medalist(s)	3	Turkey	Oğuzhan Kaya, Yasmani Copello, Sinan Ören, İsmail Nezir	3:04.55	
4	5	Slovenia	Jure Grkman, Lovro Mesec Košir, Gregor Grahovac, Rok Ferlan	3:05.12	
5	7	France	Ludvy Vaillant, Christopher Naliali, Ludovic Le Meur, Muhammad Kounta	3:05.35	
6	2	Morocco	Rachid M'hamdi, Mostafa Smaili, Ismail Manyani, Hamza Dair	3:07.04	
	4	Tunisia		DNS	

=== High jump ===
1 July

Rank	Name	Nationality	1.99	2.04	2.09	2.13	2.16	2.19	2.22	2.24	2.26	Result	Notes
1st place, gold medalist(s)	Bilel Afer	Algeria	–	o	xo	o	o	xxo	xxo	xxo	xxx	2.24	PB
2nd place, silver medalist(s)	Majd Eddin Ghazal	Syria	–	–	o	–	o	o	o	xxx		2.22	
3rd place, bronze medalist(s)	Hichem Bouhanoun	Algeria	–	o	o	o	o	xo	o	xxx		2.22	PB
4	Adónios Mérlos	Greece	–	o	o	–	xxo	xxo	xxo	xxx		2.22	SB
5	Nathan Ismar	France	–	–	o	o	o	o	xxx			2.19	
5	Sébastien Micheau	France	–	–	o	o	o	o	xxx			2.19	
7	Marco Fassinotti	Italy	–	–	o	–	xo	xo	xxx			2.19	
8	Christian Falocchi	Italy	–	–	o	xo	xxo	xxx				2.16	
9	Alperen Acet	Turkey	–	–	o	o	xxx					2.13	
10	Mohamed Talaat Abou Taleb	Egypt	o	o	o	xxx						2.09	
11	Gerson Varela Baldé	Portugal	–	o	o	x–	–	xx				2.09	
12	Kyriakos Pampaka	Cyprus	o	o	xxx							2.04	
	Vasilios Konstantinou	Cyprus										DNS	

=== Pole vault ===
2 July

Rank	Name	Nationality	4.70	4.90	5.10	5.30	5.45	5.55	5.60	5.65	5.70	5.75	5.81	Result	Notes
1st place, gold medalist(s)	Ersu Şaşma	Turkey	–	–	–	o	o	o	o	o	o	xo	xx	5.75	GR
2nd place, silver medalist(s)	Anthony Ammirati	France	–	–	–	o	xxo	xxo	–	xo	–	xxx		5.65	
3rd place, bronze medalist(s)	Ioannis Rizos	Greece	–	–	xo	xo	xo	xo	xxo	xxx				5.60	PB
4	Mathieu Collet	France	–	–	o	o	o	xxx						5.45	
5	Isidro Leyva	Spain	–	–	o	o	xo	xxx						5.45	
6	Max Mandusic	Italy	–	–	–	o	xxx							5.30	
7	Hichem Kalil Cherabi	Algeria	–	–	o	xo	xxx							5.30	
8	Nikandros Stylianou	Cyprus	o	o	xo	xxo	xxx							5.30	SB
9	Christos Tamanis	Cyprus	–	xo	xo	xxx								5.10	
	Ivan De Angelis	Italy												DNS	
	Robert Renner	Slovenia												DNS	

=== Long jump ===
3 July

Rank	Name	Nationality	#1	#2	#3	#4	#5	#6	Result	Notes
1st place, gold medalist(s)	Augustin Bey	France	x	7.86	x	7.99	x	x	7.99	
2nd place, silver medalist(s)	Lazar Anić	Serbia	7.59	7.64	7.80	x	7.68	7.83	7.83	SB
3rd place, bronze medalist(s)	Yasser Triki	Algeria	7.59	7.61	7.10	7.61	7.56	7.80	7.80	SB
4	Tom Campagne	France	x	7.73	7.78	7.60	7.61	7.03	7.78	
5	Necati Er	Turkey	7.64	x	7.60	7.67	7.76	7.12	7.76	
6	Jaime Guerra	Spain	7.52	x	7.55	x	7.29	7.60	7.60	
7	Gabriele Chilà	Italy	7.26	x	7.58	7.53	x	7.10	7.58	
8	Yassine Hajjaji	Morocco	7.21	7.50	7.57	7.20	7.33	6.96	7.57	SB
9	Jacopo Quarratesi	Italy	7.07	7.41	x				7.41	
10	Tarek Hocine	Algeria	7.02	6.98	7.00				7.02	
	Andreas Trajkovski	North Macedonia							DNS	

=== Triple jump ===
30 June

Rank	Name	Nationality	#1	#2	#3	#4	#5	#6	Result	Notes
1st place, gold medalist(s)	Yasser Triki	Algeria	16.91	16.92	17.07	16.92	16.90	16.83	17.07	
2nd place, silver medalist(s)	Tobia Bocchi	Italy	16.67	16.52	16.63	16.54	x	16.93	16.93	
3rd place, bronze medalist(s)	Tiago Pereira	Portugal	16.65	x	16.47	16.21	16.63	16.90	16.90	
4	Necati Er	Turkey	x	x	16.16	x	16.52	x	16.52	
5	Andrea Dallavalle	Italy							16.44	
6	Jan Luxa	Slovenia	x	x	14.86	15.86	x	15.44	15.86	
7	Mohammed Hammadi	Morocco	x	15.64	x	x	15.56	15.63	15.64	
8	Rida Abina	Algeria	15.28	15.33	15.28	14.68	15.14	15.44	15.44	
9	Ian Paul Grech	Malta	13.58	x	13.69				13.69	

=== Shot put ===
30 June

Rank	Name	Nationality	#1	#2	#3	#4	#5	#6	Result	Notes
1st place, gold medalist(s)	Armin Sinančević	Serbia	20.56	21.29	x	x	x	21.22	21.29	SB
2nd place, silver medalist(s)	Asmir Kolašinac	Serbia	19.00	19.02	19.61	20.37	x	20.22	20.37	
3rd place, bronze medalist(s)	Mohamed Magdi Hamza	Egypt	18.03	20.11	x	19.44	20.05	20.35	20.35	
4	Mesud Pezer	Bosnia and Herzegovina	20.23	19.92	19.73	r			20.23	
5	Tsanko Arnaudov	Portugal	18.78	19.58	20.13	x	20.04	19.98	20.13	
6	Sebastiano Bianchetti	Italy	19.42	20.03	x	19.57	x	x	20.03	
7	Odysseas Mouzenidis	Greece	18.90	19.24	19.14	19.45	x	19.09	19.45	
8	Anastasios Latifllari	Greece	18.91	x	19.31	19.36	19.00	x	19.36	
9	Riccardo Ferrara	Italy	18.61	19.18	x				19.18	
10	Muhamet Ramadani	Kosovo	17.26	17.55	18.06				18.06	
11	Fred Moudani-Likibi	France	x	17.77	17.89				17.89	
12	Mohamed Raid Redjechta	Algeria	15.91	x	15.48				15.91	
13	Mohamed Reda Bouziane	Algeria	14.53	14.44	15.46				15.46	
	Tomaš Đurović	Montenegro							DNS	

=== Discus throw ===
3 July

Rank	Name	Nationality	#1	#2	#3	#4	#5	#6	Result	Notes
1st place, gold medalist(s)	Apostolos Parellis	Cyprus	63.59	60.67	62.77	62.69	x	62.78	63.59	
2nd place, silver medalist(s)	Martin Marković	Croatia	59.01	62.49	x	60.96	x	60.97	62.49	
3rd place, bronze medalist(s)	Danijel Furtula	Montenegro	59.73	60.22	61.74	61.68	61.41	60.65	61.74	
4	Tom Reux	France	57.56	59.77	59.38	58.17	60.80	x	60.80	
5	Christoforos Genethli	Cyprus	56.04	59.60	56.80	56.87	x	57.99	59.60	
6	Nazzareno Di Marco	Italy	59.02	57.24	58.49	59.01	x	59.52	59.52	
7	Oussama Khennoussi	Algeria	58.93	x	54.81	x	57.77	x	58.93	PB
8	Ömer Şahin	Turkey	51.04	x	57.87	56.21	57.00	56.39	57.87	
9	Enes Çankaya	Turkey	57.43	52.12	56.80				57.43	
10	Giovanni Faloci	Italy	x	57.30	x				57.30	
11	Moumen Bourekba	Algeria	x	55.93	x				55.93	
12	Diego Casas	Spain	53.18	54.80	x				54.80	
13	Bradley Mifsud	Malta	44.05	47.81	48.25				48.25	
14	Alaudin Suma	Kosovo	43.90	43.20	42.13				43.90	

=== Hammer throw ===
1 July

Rank	Name	Nationality	#1	#2	#3	#4	#5	#6	Result	Notes
1st place, gold medalist(s)	Özkan Baltacı	Turkey	73.47	73.19	74.34	73.50	72.82	73.67	74.34	
2nd place, silver medalist(s)	Alexandros Poursanidis	Cyprus	70.86	73.12	73.31	x	73.71	71.58	73.71	SB
3rd place, bronze medalist(s)	Giorgio Olivieri	Italy	67.66	68.16	72.18	70.04	x	71.79	72.18	
4	Rúben Antunes	Portugal	70.42	70.97	x	x	69.46	71.62	71.62	SB
5	Jean-Baptiste Bruxelle	France	68.38	69.99	71.16	70.29	x	71.15	71.16	
6	Marco Lingua	Italy	70.22	69.74	x	x	70.70	69.41	70.70	
7	Mostafa El Gamel	Egypt	70.48	69.99	69.72	x	69.89	70.17	70.48	
8	Konstantinos Zaltos	Greece	69.26	68.93	67.87	66.85	66.90	67.84	69.26	
9	Orestis Ntousakis	Greece	68.14	x	69.05				69.05	
10	Alaa El Ashry	Egypt	66.51	65.40	67.26				67.26	
11	Alberto González	Spain	66.49	x	x				66.49	

=== Javelin throw ===
2 July

Rank	Name	Nationality	#1	#2	#3	#4	#5	#6	Result	Notes
1st place, gold medalist(s)	Leandro Ramos	Portugal	72.91	69.51	82.23	x	–	74.47	82.23	
2nd place, silver medalist(s)	Ihab Abdelrahman	Egypt	74.52	75.04	71.74	75.44	78.05	78.51	78.51	
3rd place, bronze medalist(s)	Felise Vahai Sosaia	France	73.32	76.45	75.73	x	72.03	72.83	76.45	
4	Dejan Mileusnić	Bosnia and Herzegovina	73.90	72.43	71.44	74.46	75.70	x	75.70	SB
5	Roberto Orlando	Italy	70.17	73.01	69.94	73.68	72.98	74.27	74.27	
6	Emin Öncel	Turkey	70.77	73.95	72.30	70.09	x	–	73.95	
7	Maged Mohser El Badry	Egypt	70.89	69.85	70.32	67.94	69.52	71.21	71.21	
8	Dimitrios Tsitsos	Greece	65.88	69.71	69.64	–	x	x	69.71	
9	Rémi Conroy	France	69.44	65.58	68.08				69.44	
10	Spyros Savva	Cyprus	x	67.14	x				67.14	

== Women's results ==
=== 100 metres ===
Heats – 30 June
Wind:
Heat 1: +0.7 m/s, Heat 2: +0.6 m/s

Rank	Heat	Name	Nationality	Time	Notes
1	2	Bassant Hemida	Egypt	11.23	Q
2	1	Lorène Bazolo	Portugal	11.38	Q
3	1	Olivia Fotopoulou	Cyprus	11.43	Q
4	2	Carmen Marco	Spain	11.56	Q
5	1	Gloria Hooper	Italy	11.59	Q
6	1	Hajar Eddou	Morocco	11.66	q
7	2	Giorgia Bellinazzi	Italy	11.75	Q
8	1	Mizgin Ay	Turkey	11.78	q
9	2	Ivana Ilić	Serbia	11.82	
10	2	Marianna Pisiara	Cyprus	11.92	
11	2	Alessandra Gasparelli	San Marino	11.96	
12	1	Amina Touati	Algeria	12.35	
	1	Charlotte Afriat	Monaco	DNS	
	2	Maria Rosalina Kgasi	Portugal	DNS	

Final – 30 June

Wind: +0.5 m/s

Rank	Lane	Name	Nationality	Time	Notes
1st place, gold medalist(s)	6	Bassant Hemida	Egypt	11.10	GR
2nd place, silver medalist(s)	5	Lorène Bazolo	Portugal	11.36	
3rd place, bronze medalist(s)	3	Olivia Fotopoulou	Cyprus	11.42	
4	4	Carmen Marco	Spain	11.48	
5	8	Gloria Hooper	Italy	11.62	
6	2	Hajar Eddou	Morocco	11.65	
7	7	Giorgia Bellinazzi	Italy	11.71	
8	1	Mizgin Ay	Turkey	11.86	

=== 200 metres ===
Heats – 2 July
Wind:
Heat 1: +0.6 m/s, Heat 2: +0.8 m/s

Rank	Heat	Name	Nationality	Time	Notes
1	1	Basant Hemida	Egypt	22.89	Q
2	1	Olivia Fotopoulou	Cyprus	22.99	Q, PB
3	2	Lorène Bazolo	Portugal	23.22	Q
4	2	Eva Santidrian	Spain	23.56	Q, B
5	2	Irene Siragusa	Italy	23.59	Q
6	2	Gémima Joseph	France	23.62	q
7	1	Maya Fonda Bruney	Italy	23.66	Q
8	2	Hajar Eddou	Morocco	23.77	q, PB
9	2	Ivana Ilić	Serbia	24.39	
10	2	Tamara Milutinović	Serbia	24.48	SB
11	1	Djamila Zine	Algeria	24.57	SB
12	2	Marianna Pisiara	Cyprus	24.59	
13	1	Alessandra Gasparelli	San Marino	24.93	
14	1	Carlota Malaga	Andorra	26.62	
	1	Maria Rosalina Kgasi	Portugal	DNS	
	1	Mizgin Ay	Turkey	DNS	

Final – 3 July

Wind: +0.9 m/s

Rank	Lane	Name	Nationality	Time	Notes
1st place, gold medalist(s)	4	Basant Hemida	Egypt	22.47	GR, NR
2nd place, silver medalist(s)	6	Olivia Fotopoulou	Cyprus	23.01	
3rd place, bronze medalist(s)	5	Lorène Bazolo	Portugal	23.20	
4	8	Irene Siragusa	Italy	23.27	
5	3	Eva Santidrian	Spain	23.33	PB
6	2	Gémima Joseph	France	23.41	SB
7	1	Hajar Eddou	Morocco	23.73	PB
8	7	Maya Fonda Bruney	Italy	23.81	

=== 400 metres ===
2 July

Rank	Lane	Name	Nationality	Time	Notes
1st place, gold medalist(s)	5	Cátia Azevedo	Portugal	51.24	SB
2nd place, silver medalist(s)	3	Anita Horvat	Slovenia	51.94	SB
3rd place, bronze medalist(s)	4	Virginia Troiani	Italy	53.14	
4	6	Raphaela Lukudo	Italy	53.37	
5	7	Büşra Yıldırım	Turkey	53.59	
6	8	Blanca Hervas	Spain	54.23	
7	1	Meriem Boulehsa	Algeria	55.87	SB
8	2	Sara El Hachimi	Morocco	56.99	

=== 800 metres ===
Heats – 30 June

Rank	Heat	Name	Nationality	Time	Notes
1	2	Ekaterina Guliyev	Turkey	2:02.64	Q
2	2	Eloisa Coiro	Italy	2:03.16	Q
3	2	Jerneja Smonkar	Slovenia	2:04.25	Q
4	2	Meriem Sahnoune	France	2:04.30	q
5	2	Patricia Silva	Portugal	2:05.06	q
6	2	Khadija Benkassem	Morocco	2:05.56	
7	1	Daniela García	Spain	2:05.92	Q
8	1	Assia Raziki	Morocco	2:06.39	Q
9	1	Tuǧba Toptaş	Turkey	2:06.82	Q
10	1	Joyce Mattagliano	Italy	2:06.85	
11	1	Charlotte Pizzo	France	2:07.44	
12	1	Ghania Rezzik	Algeria	2:09.90	
	2	Roukia Mouici	Algeria	DNS	

Final – 2 July

Rank	Name	Nationality	Time	Notes
1st place, gold medalist(s)	Ekaterina Guliyev	Turkey	2:01.08	SB
2nd place, silver medalist(s)	Eloisa Coiro	Italy	2:01.40	PB
3rd place, bronze medalist(s)	Assia Raziki	Morocco	2:01.44	PB
4	Patricia Silva	Portugal	2:03.12	PB
5	Daniela García	Spain	2:03.45	
6	Jerneja Smonkar	Slovenia	2:03.82	
7	Meriem Sahnoune	France	2:05.19	
8	Tuǧba Toptaş	Turkey	2:05.33	

=== 1500 metres ===
3 July

Rank	Name	Nationality	Time	Notes
1st place, gold medalist(s)	Aurore Fleury	France	4:13.03	
2nd place, silver medalist(s)	Federica Del Buono	Italy	4:13.09	
3rd place, bronze medalist(s)	Ludovica Cavalli	Italy	4:13.37	
4	Marina Martínez	Spain	4:14.04	
5	Şilan Ayyildiz	Turkey	4:14.45	
6	Berenice Cleyet-Merle	France	4:16.77	
7	Mariana Machado	Portugal	4:17.24	
8	Meryeme Azrour	Morocco	4:18.09	
9	Amina Bettiche	Algeria	4:18.55	SB
10	Gresa Bakraçi	Kosovo	4:27.76	
11	Abir Reffas	Algeria	4:28.97	SB
	Thalia Charalambous	Cyprus	DNS	
	Natalia Evangelidou	Cyprus	DNS	
	Marta García	Spain	DNS	
	Emine Hatun Mechaal	Turkey	DNS	

=== 5000 metres ===
2 July

Rank	Name	Nationality	Time	Notes
1st place, gold medalist(s)	Yasemin Can	Turkey	15:23.47	
2nd place, silver medalist(s)	Rahma Tahiri	Morocco	15:56.36	
3rd place, bronze medalist(s)	Leila Hadji	France	16:05.54	
4	Ikram Ouaaziz	Morocco	16:05.96	PB
5	Anastasia Marinakou	Greece	16:07.12	
6	Nawal Yahi	Algeria	16:08.52	
7	Giovanna Selva	Italy	16:08.71	
8	Emine Hatun Mechaal	Turkey	16:18.07	
9	Souad Aït Salem	Algeria	16:21.60	
10	Roberta Schembri	Malta	17:37.15	
	Thalia Charalambous	Cyprus	DNF	
	Marta García	Spain	DNS	
	Hanane Qallouj	Morocco	DNS	

=== Half marathon ===
1 July

Rank	Name	Nationality	Time	Notes
1st place, gold medalist(s)	Giovanna Epis	Italy	1:13:47	
2nd place, silver medalist(s)	Hanane Qallouj	Morocco	1:13:53	
3rd place, bronze medalist(s)	Rkia El Moukim	Morocco	1:14:05	
4	Meryem Erdoǧan	Turkey	1:14:11	
5	Margaux Sieracki	France	1:14:16	
6	Melody Julien	France	1:15:39	
7	Rebecca Lonedo	Italy	1:15:49	
8	Meline Rollin	France	1:17:08	
9	Malika Benderbal	Algeria	1:17:38	
10	Souad Aït Salem	Algeria	1:18:24	
11	Lisa Marie Bezzina	Malta	1:28:02	
	Sara Carnicelli	Vatican City	1:17:21	Participated in a non-scoring manner
	Nawal Yahi	Algeria	DNF	

=== 100 metres hurdles ===
Heats – 2 July
Wind:
Heat 1: +0.5 m/s, Heat 2: +1.0 m/s

Rank	Heat	Name	Nationality	Time	Notes
1	2	Nicla Mosetti	Italy	13.02	Q, PB
2	2	Solenn Compper	France	13.12	Q
3	1	Elena Carraro	Italy	13.15	Q
4	2	Elisavet Pesiridou	Greece	13.17	Q, SB
5	2	Şevval Ayaz	Turkey	13.17	q, PB
6	2	Anja Lukić	Serbia	13.26	q, PB
7	1	Léa Vendôme	France	13.29	Q
8	2	Aitana Radsma	Spain	13.39	SB
9	1	Olimpia Barbosa	Portugal	13.47	Q
10	2	Natalia Christofi	Cyprus	13.48	
11	1	Dafni Georgiou	Cyprus	13.56	
12	1	Ivana Lončarek	Croatia	13.69	
13	1	Lina Amer Jaber Ahmed	Egypt	13.82	SB
14	1	Rahil Hamel	Algeria	14.02	

Final – 3 July

Wind: +1.0 m/s

Rank	Lane	Name	Nationality	Time	Notes
1st place, gold medalist(s)	6	Solenn Compper	France	12.92	PB
2nd place, silver medalist(s)	3	Nicla Mosetti	Italy	13.22	
3rd place, bronze medalist(s)	7	Elisavet Pesiridou	Greece	13.23	
4	8	Olimpia Barbosa	Portugal	13.30	
5	1	Anja Lukić	Serbia	13.40	
6	5	Léa Vendôme	France	13.44	
7	4	Elena Carraro	Italy	13.67	
8	2	Şevval Ayaz	Turkey	DQ	

=== 400 metres hurdles ===
Heats – 30 June

Rank	Heat	Name	Nationality	Time	Notes
1	2	Rebecca Sartori	Italy	56.55	Q
2	2	Noura Ennadi	Morocco	56.64	Q
3	1	Camille Seri	France	56.94	Q
4	2	Vera Barbosa	Portugal	57.15	Q
5	1	Alice Muraro	Italy	57.20	Q
6	1	Carla García	Spain	57.30	Q
7	1	Dimitra Gnafaki	Greece	57.53	q
8	2	Agata Zupin	Slovenia	58.06	q
9	1	Drita Islami Baftiri	North Macedonia	59.16	
10	2	Loubna Benhadja	Algeria	1:00.30	
11	2	Beatrice Berti	San Marino	1:02.81	
12	1	Marie-Charlotte Gastaud	Monaco	1:04.34	
13	2	Bruna Luque	Andorra	1:04.43	
	1	Shana Grebo	France	DNS	

Final – 1 July

Rank	Lane	Name	Nationality	Time	Notes
1st place, gold medalist(s)	4	Rebecca Sartori	Italy	55.75	
2nd place, silver medalist(s)	6	Camille Seri	France	56.01	
3rd place, bronze medalist(s)	5	Noura Ennadi	Morocco	56.45	PB
4	2	Dimitra Gnafaki	Greece	56.55	PB
5	7	Vera Barbosa	Portugal	56.82	
6	8	Carla García	Spain	56.83	
7	3	Alice Muraro	Italy	57.12	PB
	1	Agata Zupin	Slovenia	DNS	

=== 3000 metres steeplechase ===
1 July

Rank	Name	Nationality	Time	Notes
1st place, gold medalist(s)	Luiza Gega	Albania	9:14.29	GR, NR
2nd place, silver medalist(s)	Marwa Bouzayani	Tunisia	9:29.11	
3rd place, bronze medalist(s)	Ikram Ouaaziz	Morocco	9:32.87	PB
4	Amina Bettiche	Algeria	9:37.18	SB
5	Martina Merlo	Italy	9:38.84	SB
6	Flavie Renouard	France	9:52.53	
7	Alexa Lemitre	France	9:52.65	SB
8	Sabah Es-Seqally	Morocco	9:54.81	PB
9	Clara Viñaras	Spain	10:12.34	
10	Anna Arnaudo	Italy	10:22.46	
	Tuğba Güvenç	Turkey	DNF	

=== 4 × 100 metres relay ===
1 July

Rank	Lane	Nation	Competitors	Time	Notes
1st place, gold medalist(s)	4	Italy	Irene Siragusa, Gloria Hooper, Aurora Berton, Johanelis Herrera Abreu	43.68	
2nd place, silver medalist(s)	5	France	Mallory Leconte, Eloïse De La Taille, Gémima Joseph, Wided Atatou	44.63	
3rd place, bronze medalist(s)	6	Cyprus	Dafni Georgiou, Marianna Pisiara, Filippa Fotopoulou, Olivia Fotopoulou	45.10	
	7	Portugal		DNS	

=== 4 × 400 metres relay ===
3 July

Rank	Lane	Nation	Competitors	Time	Notes
1st place, gold medalist(s)	4	Italy	Anna Polinari, Virginia Troiani, Raphaela Lukudo, Giancarla Trevisan	3:29.93	
2nd place, silver medalist(s)	7	Slovenia	Agata Zupin, Jerneja Smonkar, Maja Pogorevc, Anita Horvat	3:31.51	
3rd place, bronze medalist(s)	5	Turkey	Şevval Ayaz, Ekaterina Guliyev, Tuğba Toptaş, Büşra Yıldırım	3:43.13	
4	3	Algeria	Loubna Benhadja, Douaa Ferdi, Chaima Ouanis, Meriem Boulehsa	3:45.18	
	6	Morocco	Salma Lehlali, Sara El Hachimi, Assia Raziki, Noura Ennadi	DQ	R17.3.1

=== High jump ===
3 July

Rank	Name	Nationality	1.67	1.72	1.77	1.81	1.84	1.87	1.90	1.92	1.96	Result	Notes
1st place, gold medalist(s)	Marija Vuković	Montenegro	–	–	–	o	–	o	xo	o	xxx	1.92	
2nd place, silver medalist(s)	Tatiana Gusin	Greece	–	–	–	o	o	xo	o	xxx		1.90	SB
3rd place, bronze medalist(s)	Marta Morara	Italy	–	o	o	o	xxo	o	xxx			1.87	PB
4	Eleftheria Christogeorgou	Greece	–	o	o	o	o	xxo	xxx			1.87	
5	Solène Gicquel	France	–	–	o	o	o	xxx				1.84	
5	Rhizlane Siba	Morocco	–	o	o	o	o	xxx				1.84	
5	Buse Savaşkan	Turkey	–	–	o	o	o	xxx				1.84	
8	Erika Furlani	Italy	–	–	o	o	xxo	xxx				1.84	
9	Despoina Charalambous	Cyprus	o	o	o	xxx						1.77	
9	Styliana Ioannidou	Cyprus	o	o	o	xxx						1.77	
11	Laureen Maxwell-Quinol	France	–	–	xo	xxx						1.72	
12	Darina Hadil Rezik	Algeria	o	xxo	xxx							1.72	
13	Afaf Benhadja	Algeria	o	xxx								1.67	

=== Long jump ===
1 July

Rank	Name	Nationality	#1	#2	#3	#4	#5	#6	Result	Notes
1st place, gold medalist(s)	Milica Gardašević	Serbia	6.53	6.65	6.64	x	x	6.67	6.67	
2nd place, silver medalist(s)	Esraa Owis	Egypt	6.30	6.31	6.54	6.40	6.29	6.37	6.54	
3rd place, bronze medalist(s)	Evelise Veiga	Portugal	6.15	6.54	6.39	x	x	6.21	6.54	
4	Neja Filipič	Slovenia	x	6.28	6.09	6.29	6.31	6.45	6.45	
5	Tiphaine Mauchant	France	6.35	6.44	6.26	6.20	6.19	6.41	6.44	SB
6	Vasiliki Chaitidou	Greece	6.27	6.34	6.16	6.19	6.20	6.06	6.34	
7	Filippa Fotopoulou	Cyprus	6.10	5.99	6.23	6.07	6.34	6.11	6.34	
8	Laura Strati	Italy	6.00	x	6.14	6.13	6.03	5.68	6.14	
9	Marie-Jeanne Ourega	France	5.98	6.11	6.07				6.11	
10	Roumeissa Belabiod	Algeria	6.06	5.93	x				6.06	
11	Yousra Lajdoud	Morocco	6.06	x	x				6.06	
12	Irati Mitxelena	Spain	5.87	6.03	6.01				6.03	
13	Kaoutar Selmi	Algeria	5.86	5.85	5.81				5.86	

=== Triple jump ===
2 July

Rank	Name	Nationality	#1	#2	#3	#4	#5	#6	Result	Notes
1st place, gold medalist(s)	Neja Filipič	Slovenia	x	14.15	x	14.16	x	14.05	14.16	
2nd place, silver medalist(s)	Tuğba Danışmaz	Turkey	13.67	13.74	14.02	14.05	13.92	x	14.05	
3rd place, bronze medalist(s)	Tessy Ebosele	Spain	12.80	13.12	12.47	x	13.42	13.63	13.63	
4	Jeanine Assani Issouf	France	13.53	13.51	x	13.56	x	13.44	13.56	
5	Eva Pepelnak	Slovenia	13.36	13.27	x	13.25	13.21	13.21	13.36	
6	Evelise Veiga	Portugal	13.20	x	x	13.31	x	x	13.31	
7	Kaoutar Selmi	Algeria	12.53	x	13.22	13.28	12.97	13.09	13.28	PB
8	Wissal Harkas	Algeria	x	x	13.02	12.67	x	12.32	13.02	PB
9	Rachela Pace	Malta	x	12.22	x				12.22	

=== Discus throw ===
30 June

Rank	Name	Nationality	#1	#2	#3	#4	#5	#6	Result	Notes
1st place, gold medalist(s)	Marija Tolj	Croatia	59.15	57.70	64.71	60.86	62.29	x	64.71	PB
2nd place, silver medalist(s)	Liliana Cá	Portugal	61.91	63.05	x	62.53	63.62	x	63.62	
3rd place, bronze medalist(s)	Özlem Becerek	Turkey	61.96	x	x	x	x	x	61.96	
4	Stefania Strumillo	Italy	55.55	52.96	55.93	x	53.70	54.84	55.93	
5	Androniki Lada	Cyprus	–	51.16	53.60	51.76	55.84	54.00	55.84	
6	Diletta Fortuna	Italy	x	x	x	x	50.98	x	50.98	
7	Nabila Bounab	Algeria	41.63	x	41.64	42.19	x	x	42.19	

=== Hammer throw ===
30 June

Rank	Name	Nationality	#1	#2	#3	#4	#5	#6	Result	Notes
1st place, gold medalist(s)	Laura Redondo	Spain	x	68.12	x	x	69.37	69.97	69.97	
2nd place, silver medalist(s)	Kıvılcım Kaya	Turkey	x	68.17	69.13	69.82	68.67	68.17	69.82	SB
3rd place, bronze medalist(s)	Zouina Bouzebra	Algeria	62.63	63.21	65.41	65.45	63.78	59.60	65.45	PB
4	Xena Ngomateke	France	62.49	64.15	x	65.42	x	61.45	65.42	
5	Osarumen Odeh	Spain	x	62.39	63.22	64.17	65.05	63.42	65.05	
6	Rawan Barakat	Egypt	61.57	63.93	63.70	64.28	62.70	63.37	64.28	
7	Lucia Prinetti Anzalapya	Italy	x	62.59	63.48	63.91	x	x	63.91	
8	Lorelei Taillandier	France	x	61.21	61.95	59.37	60.71	61.93	61.95	
9	Zahra Tatar	Algeria	61.35	55.84	61.93				61.93	
10	Nadia Maffo	Italy	61.82	x	59.67				61.82	
11	Chrystalla Kyriakou	Cyprus	60.68	61.12	60.71				61.12	

=== Javelin throw ===
2 July

Rank	Name	Nationality	#1	#2	#3	#4	#5	#6	Result	Notes
1st place, gold medalist(s)	Adriana Vilagoš	Serbia	57.39	57.49	60.22	54.09	57.59	58.47	60.22	
2nd place, silver medalist(s)	Eda Tuğsuz	Turkey	55.25	x	58.65	x	59.30	x	59.30	SB
3rd place, bronze medalist(s)	Alizee Minard	France	54.12	52.85	54.44	55.16	x	56.22	56.22	
4	Esra Türkmen	Turkey	55.78	55.26	56.03	x	x	x	56.03	
5	Sara Zabarino	Italy	50.51	53.98	50.14	51.40	x	53.57	53.98	
6	Carolina Visca	Italy	50.89	52.18	x	x	50.25	x	52.18	
