= Ossama Meslek =

Italian middle-distance runner

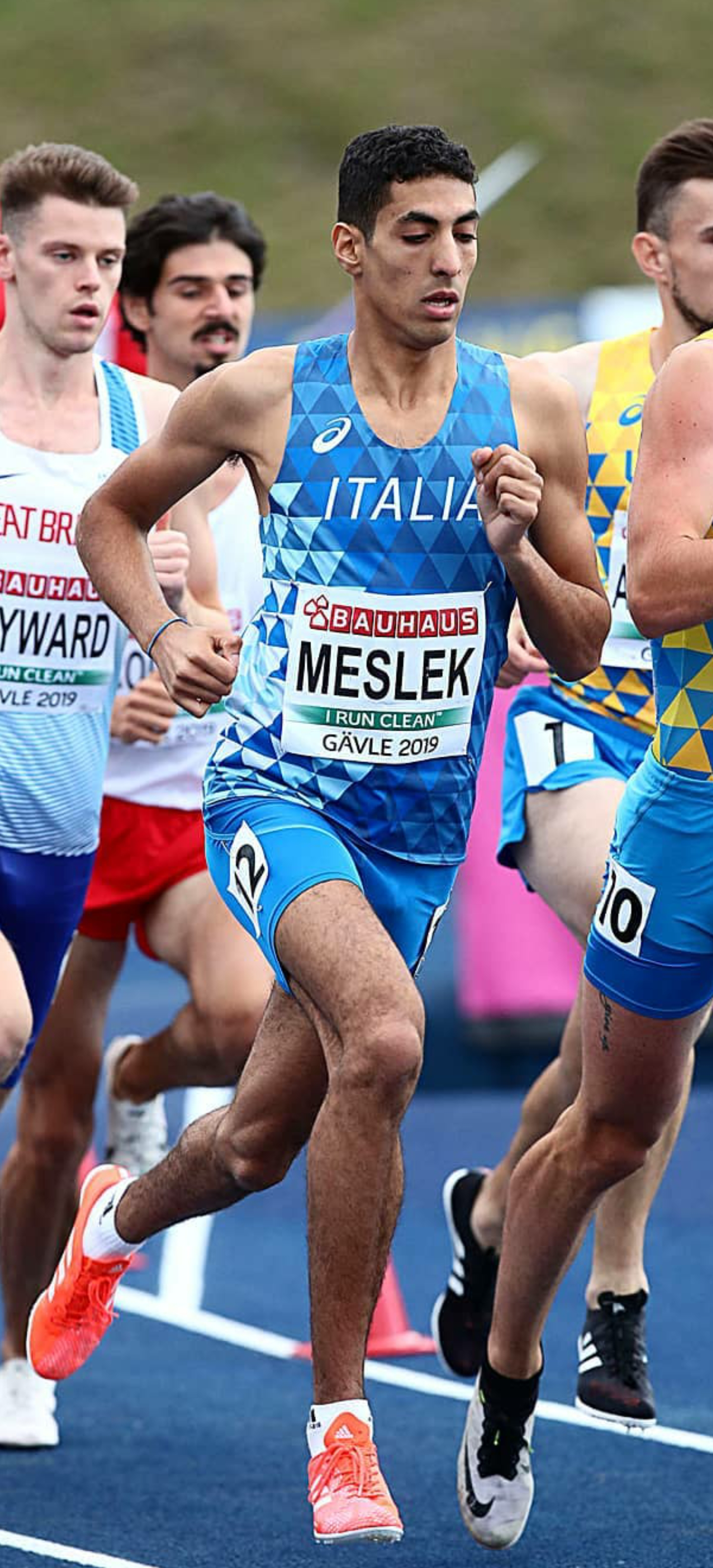
- Meslek at European athletics championships Gavle 2019

Personal information
- National team: Italy
- Born: 8 January 1997 (age 29) Vicenza, Italy

Sport
- Event: 1500 metres
- Coached by: Matthew Yates

Achievements and titles
- Personal bests: 1500 m: 3:32.77 (2024); 3000 m: 7:43.63 (2022)
Medal record
Mediterranean Games
Bronze medal – third place	2022 Oran	1500 metres

Ossama Meslek (born 8 January 1997) is an Italian middle-distance runner who specialises in the 1500 metres. He represented Italy at the 2024 Olympic games.

== Biography ==
Meslek gained his first international experience in 2018 when he finished fifth at the U23 Mediterranean Championships in Jesolo in 3:55.04. The following year he reached eighth place at the 2019 European Athletics U23 Championships in Gävle in 3:51.97.

In 2019 Meslek was Italian indoor champion in the 3000 metres.

== National records ==
- 1500 m indoor: 3:36.04 ( (France) Metz, 3 February 2024) - Current holder

== Personal bests ==
- 1500 m: 3:37.25 min, 16 June 2022 in Copenhagen
  - 1500 m (Indoor): 3:36.04 min, 3 February 2024 in Metz
- Mile: 3:55.39 min, 19 May 2022 in London
  - Mile (Indoor): 4:15.32 min, 7 February 2016 in Cardiff
- 3000 m (Indoor): 7:44.35 min, 12 February 2022 in Metz

== National titles ==
- Italian Athletics Championships
  - 1500 metres: 2022
- Italian Athletics Indoor Championships
  - 3000 metres: 2019, 2023

== See also ==
- List of Italian records in athletics
