= Androniki Lada =

Cypriot discus thrower

Personal information
- Native name: Ανδρονίκη Λαδά
- National team: Cyprus
- Born: 19 April 1991 (age 35)
- Years active: 2014–

Sport
- Country: Cyprus
- Sport: Discus throw

Achievements and titles
- National finals: 2016, 2017, 2018, 2019, 2020, 2021, 2022
- Commonwealth finals: 2014, 2018
- Personal best: 59.18 m
Medal record
Representing Cyprus
Games of the Small States of Europe
Silver medal – second place	2017 San Marino	Discus
Balkan Athletics Championships
Gold medal – first place	2022 Craiova	Discus
Championships of the Small States of Europe
Bronze medal – third place	2022 Marsa	Discus
Silver medal – second place	2024 Gibraltar	Discus

Androniki Lada (Greek: Ανδρονίκη Λαδά, born 19 April 1991) is a Cypriot discus thrower who has won seven consecutive national championships. Lada finished second in the discus event at the 2017 Games of the Small States of Europe, first in the discus event at the 2022 Balkan Athletics Championships, second at the 2024 Championships of the Small States of Europe and third at the 2022 Championships of the Small States of Europe. She came eighth at the discus event at the 2018 Commonwealth Games.

== Career ==
Lada has won seven consecutive Cyprus National Championships, from 2016 to 2021. In 2014, she set a personal best throw, and Cyprus national record, of 56.69 metres. She came 13th in the discus competition at the 2014 Commonwealth Games in Glasgow, Scotland. Lada came eighth at the discus event at the 2015 Summer Universiade in Gwangju, South Korea. In 2017, Lada represented Cyprus at the European Throwing Cup, as Cyprus' national champion. In the same year, Lada finished second in the discus event at the 2017 Games of the Small States of Europe with a best throw of 50.01 m.

Lada competed for Cyprus at the 2018 Commonwealth Games in Gold Coast, Australia. She finished eighth in the event, with a best throw of 53.12 m. At the 2019 Cyprus National Championships, Lada won the discus event by over 10 metres. In February 2020, Lada beat her own Cyprus national record, with a throw of 59.18 metres. As a result, she qualified for the 2020 European Athletics Championships, though the event was later cancelled due to the COVID-19 pandemic. Lada was in the running to qualify for the 2020 Summer Olympics, based on her world ranking position, until the Olympics were postponed. In May 2020, Lada was in the first group of Cypriot athletes allowed to train during the COVID-19 pandemic. She came eighth in the discus event at the 2021 European Throwing Cup, with a best throw of 57.54m.

In 2022, Lada won the discus event at the Balkan Athletics Championship, and came third in the discus event at the Championships of the Small States of Europe. Lada was second in the discus event at the 2024 Championships of the Small States of Europe.
