= Franko Burraj =

Albanian sprinter (born 1998)

Personal information
- Born: 19 August 1998 (age 28)
- Height: 1.93 m (6 ft 4 in)
- Weight: 83 kg (183 lb)

Sport
- Sport: Athletics
- Event: 400 m
- Club: KS Vllaznia Shkodra
- Coached by: Bruno Rrotani

Franko Burraj (born 19 August 1998) is an Albanian sprinter specialising in the 400 metres. He represented his country at one outdoor and one indoor European Championships. He currently holds the Albanian records in the 400 metres both indoors and out.

== International competitions ==
| Year | Competition | Venue | Position | Event | Notes |
Representing Albania
| 2018 | Mediterranean U23 Championships | Jesolo, Italy | – | 200 m | DQ |
| 2018 | Mediterranean U23 Championships | Jesolo, Italy | 8th | 400 m | 47.08 |
| 2018 | Mediterranean Games | Tarragona, Spain | 6th | 400 m | 46.58 |
| 2018 | European Championships | Berlin, Germany | 28th (h) | 400 m | 47.56 |
| 2019 | Balkan Indoor Championships | Istanbul, Turkey | 3rd | 400 m | 47.64 |
| 2019 | European U23 Championships | Gävle, Sweden | 5th | 400 m | 46.79 |
| 2021 | European Indoor Championships | Toruń, Poland | 14th (sf) | 400 m | 47.45 |
| 2021 | Championships of the Small States of Europe | Serravalle, San Marino | 1st | 400 m | 46.90 |
| 2022 | Championships of the Small States of Europe | Marsa, Malta | 1st | 400 m | 46.48 |
| 2022 | Mediterranean Games | Oran, Algeria | 4th | 400 m | 46.16 |
| 2023 | World Championships | Budapest, Hungary | 52nd (h) | 200 m | 21.52 |
| 2024 | World Indoor Championships | Glasgow, United Kingdom | 11th (sf) | 400 m | 47.78 |
| 2024 | Championships of the Small States of Europe | Gibraltar | 2nd | 200 m | 21.52 |
| 2024 | Championships of the Small States of Europe | Gibraltar | 1st | 200 m | 47.73 |
| 2024 | Championships of the Small States of Europe | Gibraltar | – | Medley relay | DNF |
| 2024 | Olympic Games | Paris, France | 67th (h) | 100 m | 10.66 |
| 2025 | European Indoor Championships | Apeldoorn, Netherlands | 28th (h) | 400 m | 49.70 |
| 2026 | World Indoor Championships | Toruń, Poland | 16th (sf) | 400 m | 47.23 |
| 2026 | European Championships | Birmingham, United Kingdom | 23rd (h) | 400 m | 46.96 |
| 2026 | Mediterranean Games | Taranto, Italy | 10th (h) | 400 m | 46.19 |

== Personal bests ==
Outdoor

- 200 metres – 21.19 (-0.1 m/s, Crakova Poloni 2022)
- 400 metres – 46.16 (Oran 2022) NR

Indoor

- 400 metres – 46.83 (Istanbul 2020) NR
