= Carla Scicluna =

Maltese sprinter

Personal information
- Born: 27 January 2001 (age 25)

Sport
- Country: Malta
- Sport: Athletics
- Events: 100 m, 200 m

Carla Scicluna (born 27 January 2001) is a Maltese sprinter. She competed at the 2020 Summer Olympics, in Women's 100 m.

== Biography ==
Carla Scicluna was born on 27 January 2001. She won gold medals in the 100 m and 4×100 Metres Relay at the Malta national championships in 2020. She was a 200 m semi-finalist at the European Youth Olympic Festival in 2017, and placed fourth in the 200m at the 2021 Championships of the Small States of Europe.

Scicluna qualified for the 100m at the 2020 Summer Olympics, through a universality place. As of In 2021, she was a second-year medical student at the University of Malta. At the Olympics, Scicluna finished fourth in her preliminary-round race in 12.11 seconds, advancing to the first round as the fastest remaining qualifier. She subsequently finished eighth in her first-round heat in 12.16 seconds and did not advance to the semi-finals.

She was part of the Malta team for the 4 × 100 metres relay at the 2022 Commonwealth Games, alongside Claire Azzopardi, Janet Richard and Charlotte Wingfield. The team set a Maltese national record of 45.59 seconds, improving the previous mark of 45.80 seconds, but did not advance from the heats.

At the 2023 Games of the Small States of Europe in Malta, Scicluna won the silver medal in the women's 200 metres, setting a national record of 23.74 seconds. She also won gold in the women's 4 × 100 metres relay with Azzopardi, Richard and Wingfield, with the team recording a time of 45.39 seconds.

Scicluna won bronze in the women's 100 metres in 12.13 seconds and silver in the 200 metres in 24.45 seconds at the 2024 Championships of the Small States of Europe, finishing behind fellow Maltese sprinter Wingfield. She also won gold in the women's Swedish relay alongside Richard, Wingfield and Azzopardi, with the team finishing in 2 minutes 10.62 seconds.
