= Christania Williams =

Jamaican-Austrian sprinter & bobsledder

Personal information
- Full name: Christania Simone Williams
- Born: 17 October 1994 (age 31) Saint Ann Parish, Jamaica
- Height: 1.65 m (5 ft 5 in)
- Weight: 63 kg (139 lb)

Sport
- Country: Jamaica; Austria
- Sport: Athletics; Bobsleigh
- Events: 100 metres Two-woman
Medal record
Olympic Games
Silver medal – second place	2016 Rio de Janeiro	4 × 100 m relay
World Championships
Bronze medal – third place	2017 London	4 × 100 m relay
Commonwealth Games
Silver medal – second place	2018 Gold Coast	100 m
Silver medal – second place	2018 Gold Coast	4 × 100 m relay
World Youth Championships
Gold medal – first place	2011 Lille	Medley relay
Bronze medal – third place	2011 Lille	100 m

Christania Simone Williams (born 17 October 1994) is a Jamaican sprinter and an Austrian bobsledder, who was a medalist in the women's 4 × 100 metres relay at the 2016 Olympic Games and 2017 World Championships, as well as winning silver medals in the 100 metres and 4 × 100 m relay at the 2018 Commonwealth Games. She finished ninth in the two-woman bobsleigh event at the 2026 Winter Olympics.

She is the only athlete (other than those doing the same compulsorily due to the Reunification of Germany, the Breakup of Yugoslavia or the Dissolution of Czechoslovakia), who competed at a Summer Olympic Games for one country and a Winter Olympic Games for another.

== Athletics career ==
Born in Saint Mary Parish, Jamaica, Williams attended Oracabessa High School before transferring to Edwin Allen High School in Clarendon Parish, Jamaica. In 2011, her time of 11.39 seconds for the 100 metres moved her to the top of the world U18 list. She was a bronze medalist in the 100 metres at the 2011 World Youth Championships in Lille, France, also winning a gold medal in the medley relay at the championships. In 2014, she ran 11.19 seconds to win the senior ISSA Boys’ and Girls’ Championships. She started her professional athletics career at the MVP Track Club under head coach Stephen Francis. Howvever, she missed the 2015 Jamaican senior trials due to a hamstring injury.

Williams ran below 11 seconds for the 100 metres in 2016, with a personal best time of 10.97 seconds to place third in the Jamaican Olympic Trials. Williams represented Jamaica at the 2016 Summer Olympics in Rio de Janeiro where she was a finalist in the women's 100 metres event, lowering her personal best to 10.96 seconds. She won a silver medal in the women's 4 × 100 metres at the Games, running in the final alongside Veronica Campbell-Brown, Shelly-Ann Fraser-Pryce and Elaine Thompson as they produced the fifth-fastest time in history of 41.36 seconds, finishing in second place behind the US, but with the fastest ever time recorded for a second-placed team.

The following year, she represented Jamaica at the 2017 World Relays, in Nassau, The Bahamas, and won a bronze medal in the sprint relay at the 2017 World Athletics Championships in London. In 2018, she was a silver medalist in the 100 metres at the 2018 Commonwealth Games in Gold Coast, Australia, recovering from a slow start to finish in 11.21 seconds to win the silver medal behind Michelle-Lee Ahye of Trinidad and Tobago, and ahead of compatriot Gayon Evans. Later at the Games, alongside Evans she was a medalist in the women's 4 × 100 metres relay with Natasha Morrison and Elaine Thompson.

In 2018, Williams ran a personal best in the 60 metres of 7.14 seconds competing on the 2018 IAAF World Indoor Tour in Glasgow, Scotland. A time she equalled in 2021 at the American Track League in Arkansas. After a period of time on the sidelines due to injury, Williams returned to racing in 2023 in Austria.

== Bobsleigh career ==
Having moved to Austria, she began training at the sports centre in St. Pölten competing in two-woman bobsleigh as a pusher for Katrin Beierl, who also trains in St. Polten. The pair competed at the 2024–25 Bobsleigh World Cup event in Innsbruck-Igls in January 2025. On 29 August 2025, she was nationalized as Austrian and gained Austrian citizenship.

Williams was selected to represent Austria at the 2026 Winter Olympics in the two-woman bobsleigh event alongside Katrin Beierl.
