= 2024 Championships of the Small States of Europe =

- Dates: 22 June
- Host city: Gibraltar
- Venue: Lathbury Athletics Stadium
- Level: Senior
- Events: 29
- Participation: 206 athletes from 16 nations

The 2024 Championships of the Small States of Europe was the fifth edition of the biennial competition in outdoor athletics organised by the Athletic Association of Small States of Europe. It was held on 22 June 2024 at the Lathbury Athletics Stadium in Gibraltar across 29 events. A total of 206 athletes representing 16 nations competed at the Championships, including first-time scoring participant Vatican City. Iceland won the most gold medals with seven, while Cyprus won the most medals with sixteen.

== Background ==
The Championships of the Small States of Europe is a biennial competition in outdoor athletics organised by the Athletic Association of Small States of Europe (AASSE) with support from European Athletics. The first edition of the competition was held in 2016 in Marsa, Malta, with the goal of improving sport in European small states such as Andorra and Iceland and members of the AASSE.

This edition of the Championships marked the fifth edition of the competition. It would be held on 22 June in Gibraltar at the Lathbury Athletics Stadium. A total of 29 events were held during the Championships.

=== Participants ===
A total of 206 athletes representing 16 states would compete at the Championships, including the debut of Vatican City as a regular scoring competitor. Before that, Vatican City competed at the 2022 Championships of the Small States of Europe in Marsa, Malta, as a non-scoring competitor.

- Albania (11)
- Andorra (13)
- Armenia (17)
- Cyprus (16)
- Georgia (5)
- Gibraltar (31)
- Iceland (17)
- Kosovo (10)
- Liechtenstein (3)
- Luxembourg (29)
- Malta (17)
- Moldova (3)
- Monaco (11)
- Montenegro (7)
- San Marino (11)
- Vatican City (5)

== Medal summary ==
=== Men ===
Albania, Cyprus, Iceland, and Malta tied for the most gold medals in the men's events with two each.

Men's medal summary
Event	Gold		Silver		Bronze	
100 metres	Francesco Sansovini (SMR)	10.63	Beppe Grillo (MLT)	10.71	Stavros Avgoustinou (CYP)	10.80
200 metres	Stavros Avgoustinou (CYP)	21.24	Franko Burraj (ALB)	21.52	Beppe Grillo (MLT)	21.57
400 metres	Franko Burraj (ALB)	47.73	Paisios Dimitriadis (CYP)	48.47	Graham Pellegrini (MLT)	48.56
800 metres	Jared Micallef (MLT)	1:52.87	Pol Moya (AND)	1:53.57	Mathis Espagnet (LUX)	1:53.76
1500 metres	Pol Moya (AND)	4:04.86 CR	Yervand Mkrtchyan (ARM)	4:04.95	Gaspar Klückers (LUX)	4:07.01
5000 metres	Yervand Mkrtchyan (ARM)	14:30.42	Quentin Succo (MON)	14:35.02	Niall Foley (LUX)	14:37.09
Mountain road race (~6.5 km)	Kelvin Gomez (GIB)	24:36.39	Andrew Gordon (GIB)	25:32.05	Arnold Rogers (GIB)	25:54.27
110 m hurdles (wind: +2.0 m/s)	Konstantinos Tziakouris (CYP)	14.43	Axel Remy (MON)	15.81	Giuseppe Zapparata (VAT) (Note: Listed as Italy on World Athletics' official website as Vatican City is not a member of World Athletics.)	17.34
400 m hurdles	Ívar Kristinn Jasonarson (ISL)	53.20	David Friederich (LUX)	53.67	Andrea Ercolani Volta (SMR)	53.71
3000 m steeplechase	Gil Weicherding (LUX)	9:00.41	Luke Micallef (MLT)	9:08.35	Charel Friederich (LUX)	9:13.60
1000 m medley relay	Malta (MLT); Graham Pellegrini; Omar El Aida Chaffey; Matthew Galea Soler; Beppe Grillo	1:54.26	Cyprus (CYP); Paisios Dimitriadis; Stavros Avgoustinou; Anastasios Vasileiou; Konstantinos Tziakouris	1:55.41	Luxembourg (LUX); Philippe Hilger; David Wallig; Glenn Lassine; Alan Jéhanno	1:55.45
Long jump	Izmir Smajlaj (ALB)	7.83	Gor Hovakimyan (ARM)	7.59	Antreas Machallekides (CYP)	7.39
Shot put	Tomaš Đurović (MNE)	18.61	Muhamet Ramadani (KOS)	18.48	Petros Michaelides (CYP)	18.18
Discus throw	Guðni Valur Guðnason (ISL)	60.40	Danijel Furtula (MNE)	60.23	Giorgos Koniarakis (CYP)	59.15

=== Women ===
Iceland won the most gold medals in the women's events with five.

Women's medal summary
Event	Gold		Silver		Bronze	
100 metres	Paraskevi Andreou (CYP)	11.88	Marianna Pisiara (CYP)	12.05	Carla Scicluna (MLT)	12.13
200 metres	Charlotte Wingfield (MLT)	24.20	Carla Scicluna (MLT)	24.45	Gayane Chiloyan (ARM)	24.64
400 metres	Kalliopi Kountouri (CYP)	54.18	Janet Richard (MLT)	54.32	Milena Grigoryan (ARM)	56.18
800 metres	Stavrini Filippou (CYP)	2:06.76	Ellada Alaverdyan (ARM)	2:07.38	Gina McNamara (MLT)	2:09.09
1500 metres	Gina McNamara (MLT)	4:45.43	Gresa Bakraci (KOS)	4:46.83	Embla Margrét Hreimsdóttir (ISL)	4:50.41
5000 metres	Andrea Kolbeinsdóttir (ISL)	17:13.55	Gina McNamara (MLT)	18:02.62	Gresa Bakraci (KOS)	18:05.90
Mountain road race (~6.5 km)	Kim Baglietto (GIB)	31:33.32	Chiara Guiducci (SMR)	32:34.85	Karyn Barnett (GIB)	35:28.07
100 m hurdles (wind: +0.5 m/s)	Júlía Kristín Jóhannesdóttir (ISL)	14.36	Andjela Drobnjak (MNE)	14.50	Julia Rohrer (LIE)	14.84
400 m hurdles	Ingibjörg Sigurðardóttir (ISL)	60.22	Kalypso Stavrou (CYP)	60.39	Alba Viñals (AND)	61.46
3000 m steeplechase	Andreea Stavila (MDA)	10:02.55	Chrystalla Chadjipolydorou (CYP)	11:11.86	Eloïse Lefevre (LUX)	11:33.67
1000 m medley relay	Malta (MLT); Claire Azzopardi; Charlotte Wingfield; Carla Scicluna; Janet Richard	2:10.62	Cyprus (CYP); Paraskevi Andreou; Kalypso Stavrou; Marianna Pisiara; Kalliopi Kountouri	2:11.52	Armenia (ARM); Marianna Baghyan; Gayane Chiloyan; Lilit Harutyunyan; Milena Grigoryan	2:13.80
High jump	Birta María Haraldsdóttir (ISL)	1.85	Marija Vuković (MNE)	1.77	Julie Craenen (LUX)	1.74
Long jump	Birna Kristín Kristjánsdóttir (ISL)	6.46	Rachela Pace (MLT)	6.28	Yana Sargsyan (ARM)	6.16
Shot put	Dimitriana Bezede (MDA)	17.68	Erna Sóley Gunnarsdóttir (ISL)	17.23	Sopiko Shatirishvili (GEO)	15.59
Discus throw	Alexandra Emilianov (MDA)	61.87	Androniki Lada (CYP)	53.52	Jule Insinna (LIE)	48.21

=== Medal table ===
Iceland won the most gold medals with seven, while Cyprus won the most medals with sixteen.

* Host nation (Gibraltar)

Championships of the Small States of Europe medal table
Rank	Nation	Gold	Silver	Bronze	Total
1	Iceland (ISL)	7	1	1	9
2	Cyprus (CYP)	5	7	4	16
3	Malta (MLT)	5	6	4	15
4	Moldova (MDA)	3	0	0	3
5	Gibraltar (GIB)*	2	1	2	5
6	Albania (ALB)	2	1	0	3
7	Armenia (ARM)	1	3	4	8
8	Montenegro (MNE)	1	3	0	4
9	Luxembourg (LUX)	1	1	7	9
10	Andorra (AND)	1	1	1	3
10	San Marino (SMR)	1	1	1	3
12	Kosovo (KOS)	0	2	1	3
13	Monaco (MON)	0	2	0	2
14	Liechtenstein (LIE)	0	0	2	2
15	Georgia (GEO)	0	0	1	1
15	Vatican City (VAT)	0	0	1	1
Totals (16 entries)		29	29	29	87
