= Emiliano Morbidelli =

Italian long-distance runner

Personal information
- Nationality: Italian
- Born: 23 August 1977 (age 49)

Sport
- Country: Vatican City
- Sport: Athletics, cycling
- Events: Long distance running, Road cycling

Achievements and titles
- Personal best: 5000 m: 17:13.98

Emiliano Morbidelli (born 23 August 1977) is an Italian long distance runner and road racing cyclist, competing for the Vatican City. Morbidelli is also the president of Vatican Cycling.

== Career ==
Morbidelli has represented the Vatican City in international athletics competitions as part of the Vatican's initiative to be eligible to compete in the Olympic Games. He is eligible to represent the Vatican as he works as a technician at the Bambino Gesù Hospital, which is under the jurisdiction of the nation. He participated at the 2022 Championships of the Small States of Europe in the men's 5000 m, competing for the Vatican City, alongside his compatriot Sara Carnicelli, in a "non-scoring" manner. He finished with a time of 17:28.71, placing sixth unofficially.

Morbidelli competed at the 2023 European Masters Athletics Championships in the 10K run in the 45-year-old age division and finished with a time of 36:23. He was competing unofficially, but his time would have placed him 12th.

Morbidelli once again represented the Vatican at the 2024 Championships of the Small States of Europe as a guest competitor in the men's 5000 m event. He finished with a personal best time of 17:13.98 and unofficially placed fifth.

Morbidelli is the president of Vatican Cycling, which became an official member of the International Cycling Union in September 2021 as the first sports federation from Vatican City to gain official membership of its sport's world governing body. In this role, he has accompanied athletes to events such as the 2022 UCI Road World Championships. He has participated in charity and disability awareness cycling events in the Vaitcan.
