= 2022 Championships of the Small States of Europe =

- Dates: 11 June
- Host city: Marsa, Malta
- Venue: Matthew Micallef St. John Athletics Stadium
- Level: Senior
- Events: 22
- Participation: 16 nations

The 2022 Championships of the Small States of Europe was the fourth edition of the biennial competition in outdoor track and field organised by the Athletic Association of Small States of Europe (AASE). It was held on 11 June 2022 at the Matthew Micallef St. John Athletics Stadium in Marsa, Malta. A total of 22 events were contested.

== Medal summary ==
=== Men ===
Event	Gold		Silver		Bronze	
100 metres	Kolbeinn Höður Gunnarsson (ISL)	10.59	Beppe Grillo (MLT)	10.65 w	Dagur Andri Einarsson (ISL)	10.66 w
200 metres (wind: +1.9 m/s)	Kolbeinn Höður Gunnarsson (ISL)	21.40	Stavros Avgoustinou (CYP)	21.49	Mindia Endeladze (GEO)	21.70
400 metres	Franko Burraj (ALB)	46.48	Téo Andant (MON)	46.91	Jovan Stojoski (MKD)	48.01
800 metres	Vivien Henz (LUX)	1:49.90	Stavros Spyrou (CYP)	1:50.73	Yervand Mkrtchyan (ARM)	1:50.79
5000 metres	Dario Ivanovski (MKD)	14:08.99	Maxim Răileanu (MDA)	14:24.72	Dillon Cassar (MLT)	14:45.13
110 m hurdles (wind: +2.2 m/s)	Elvis Kryukov (CYP)	14.36 w	Daniel Saliba (MLT)	14.69 w	Durjon Idrizaj (ALB)	15.72 w
1000 m medley relay	Moldova (MDA); Alexandru Zatic; Daniel Mititelu; Ian-Gheorghe Vieru; Ivan Galuşco	1:53.84	Malta (MLT); Steve Camilleri; Beppe Grillo; Matthew Galea Soler; Ben Micallef	1:55.14	Monaco (MON); Thomas Caredda; Thomas Mironenko Durier; Giovanni Molino; Téo Andant	1:55.86
Pole vault	Christos Tamanis (CYP)	5.10	Miquel Vilchez (AND)	4.70	Luc Thommen (LIE)	4.30
Long jump	Gor Beglaryan (ARM)	7.59 w	Bachana Khorava (GEO)	7.57	Muhamet Cengeli (ALB)	7.56
Discus throw	Danijel Furtula (MNE)	61.48	Bob Bertemes (LUX)	57.47	Giorgos Koniarakis (CYP)	56.93
Hammer throw	Serghei Marghiev (MDA)	74.17	Hilmar Örn Jónsson (ISL)	70.95	Alexandros Poursanidis (CYP)	65.46

=== Women ===
Event	Gold		Silver		Bronze	
100 metres (wind: +1.2 m/s)	Alessandra Gasparelli (SMR)	11.67	Marianna Pisiara (CYP)	11.73	Tiana Ósk Whitworth (ISL)	11.75
200 metres (wind: +3.0 m/s)	Olivia Fotopoulou (CYP)	23.04 w	Tiana Ósk Whitworth (ISL)	24.25 w	Charlotte Wingfield (MLT)	24.41 w
400 metres	Janet Richard (MLT)	55.12	Gayane Chiloyan (ARM)	55.64	Anna Berghii (MDA)	56.57
800 metres	Ellada Alaverdyan (ARM)	2:13.38	Natalia Evangelidou (CYP)	2:13.73	Fanny Arendt (LUX)	2:13.87
5000 metres	Lilia Fisikovici (MDA)	16:42.11	Íris Anna Skúladóttir (ISL)	17:09.10	Roberta Schembri (MLT)	17:23.66
100 m hurdles (wind: +1.6 m/s)	Angeliki Athanasopoulou (CYP)	14.07	Glódis Edda Þuríðardóttir (ISL)	14.39	Iuliana Dovganici (MDA)	14.43
1000 m medley relay	Malta (MLT); Claire Azzopardi; Carla Scicluna; Charlotte Wingfield; Janet Richard	2:10.37	Moldova (MDA); Iuliana Dovganici; Diana Podoleanu; Anna Berghii; Tatiana Contrebuţ	2:14.05	Luxembourg (LUX); Laurence Jones; Sandrine Rossi; Anaïs Bauer; Fanny Arendt	2:17.21
Pole vault	Angelina Zhuk-Krasnova (MDA)	3.80	Andrea Vasou (CYP)	3.70	Peppyna Dalli (MLT)	3.60
Long jump	Claire Azzopardi (MLT)	6.21	Irma Gunnarsdóttir (ISL)	5.96 w	Pantelitsa Charalampous (CYP)	5.93
Discus throw	Androniki Lada (CYP)	55.26	Kristina Rakočević (MNE)	49.67	Dimitriana Bezede (MDA)	49.31
Hammer throw	Zalina Marghieva (MDA)	66.06	Elísabet Rúnarsdóttir (ISL)	64.21	Chrystalla Kyriakou (CYP)	58.02

=== Medal table ===
* Host nation (Malta)

Rank	Nation	Gold	Silver	Bronze	Total
1	Cyprus (CYP)	5	5	4	14
2	Moldova (MDA)	5	2	3	10
3	Malta (MLT)*	3	3	4	10
4	Iceland (ISL)	2	6	2	10
5	Armenia (ARM)	2	1	1	4
6	Luxembourg (LUX)	1	1	2	4
7	Montenegro (MNE)	1	1	0	2
8	Albania (ALB)	1	0	2	3
9	North Macedonia (MKD)	1	0	1	2
10	San Marino (SMR)	1	0	0	1
11	Georgia (GEO)	0	1	1	2
11	Monaco (MON)	0	1	1	2
13	Andorra (AND)	0	1	0	1
14	Liechtenstein (LIE)	0	0	1	1
Totals (14 entries)		22	22	22	66

Vatican City was also present at these championships, with two competitors Emiliano Morbidelli and Sara Carnicelli in a "non-scoring" manner. Sara Carnicelli was the third fastest in the women's 5000 m. She was awarded with an honorary bronze medal.
