= Vatican City at the Mediterranean Games =

Mediterranean Games delegation

- NOC: Vatican Athletics
- Medals: Gold 0 Silver 0 Bronze 0 Total 0

Mediterranean Games appearances (overview)
- 2022; 2026

Vatican City made its Mediterranean Games debut at the 2022 Edition in Oran, Algeria in an unofficial, non-scoring manner.

== Medals ==
| Games | Athletes | Gold | Silver | Bronze | Total | Rank |
| 1951–2018 | Did not participate | | | | | |
| (Algeria) 2022 Oran (details) | 1 | 0 | 0 | 0 | 0 | - |
| (Italy) 2026 Taranto (details) | 4 | 0 | 0 | 0 | 0 | - |
| (Kosovo) 2030 Pristina | Future Event | | | | | |
| Total | | 0 | 0 | 0 | 0 | 0 |

== See also ==
- Sport in Vatican City
