= Anna Doi =

Japanese sprinter

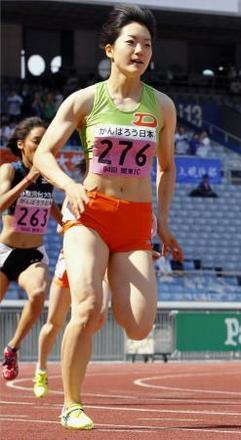

Personal information
- Nationality: Japan
- Born: 24 August 1995 (age 30) Kiyose, Tokyo, Japan
- Height: 1.58 m (5 ft 2 in)
- Weight: 50 kg (110 lb)

Sport
- Sport: Track and field
- Event(s): 100 metres, 200 metres
- University team: Daito Bunka University
- Club: Japan Airlines

Achievements and titles
- Personal best(s): 100 m: 11.43 (kumagaya 2012) NJR 200 m: 23.63 (Fukuroi 2014) 60 m: 7.40 (Osaka 2012, 2013)
Medal record
Women's athletics
Representing Japan
Asian Championships
Silver medal – second place	2015 Wuhan	4×100 m relay
East Asian Games
Silver medal – second place	2013 Tianjin	4×100 m relay

Anna Doi (土井 杏南, Doi Anna; born 24 August 1995 in Kiyose) is a Japanese sprinter. She competed for the Japanese team in the 4 × 100 metres relay at the 2012 Summer Olympics; the team placed 15th with a time of 44.25 in Round 1 and did not qualify for the final.

== Personal bests ==
Event	Time	Wind	Venue	Date	Notes
Outdoor
100 m	11.43 s	+1.8 m/s	Kumagaya, Japan	13 May 2012	Japan's 7th-fastest time
200 m	23.63 s	+1.8 m/s	Fukuroi, Japan	3 May 2014	Japan's 9th-fastest time
Indoor
60 m	7.40 s		Osaka, Japan	4 February 2012	Japan's 3rd-fastest time
60 m	7.40 s		Osaka, Japan	2 February 2013	Japan's 3rd-fastest time

== Records ==
- 100 metres
  - Current Japanese junior and high school and youth record holder - 11.43 s (wind: +1.8 m/s) (Kumagaya, 13 May 2012)
  - Current Japanese junior high school record holder - 11.61 s (wind: +0.8 m/s) (Tottori, 23 August 2010)
- 200 metres
  - Former Japanese youth record holder - 23.83 s (wind: +0.9 m/s) (Kumagaya, 14 May 2012)
- 4 × 100 m relay
  - Former Japanese high school record holder - 45.23 s (relay leg: 4th) (Oita, 30 July 2013)
  - Former Japanese youth record holder - 46.05 s (relay leg: 4th) (Kofu, 27 October 2012)
  - Current Japanese junior high school record holder - 47.30 s (relay leg: 4th) (Oita, 24 August 2009)
- 60 metres (Indoor)
  - Former Japanese and Japanese junior record holder - 7.40 s (Osaka, 4 February 2012)

== Competition record ==
Year	Competition	Venue	Position	Event	Notes
Representing Japan
2011	World Youth Championships	Lille, France	12th (sf)	100 m	12.24 (wind: -1.3 m/s)
2011	World Youth Championships	Lille, France	9th (h)	Medley relay	2:10.54 (relay leg: 3rd)
2012	Olympic Games	London, United Kingdom	15th (h)	4 × 100 m relay	44.25 (relay leg: 1st)
2013	East Asian Games	Tianjin, China	4th	100 m	12.02 (wind: +0.6 m/s)
2013	East Asian Games	Tianjin, China	2nd	4 × 100 m relay	45.17 (relay leg: 1st)
2014	World Relays	Nassau, Bahamas	18th (h)	4 × 100 m relay	44.66 (relay leg: 2nd)
2014	World Junior Championships	Eugene, United States	14th (sf)	100 m	11.84 (wind: +0.9 m/s)
2014	World Junior Championships	Eugene, United States	6th	4 × 100 m relay	45.40 (relay leg: 2nd)
2015	World Relays	Nassau, Bahamas	– (h)	4 × 100 m relay	DQ (relay leg: 2nd)
2015	Asian Championships	Wuhan, China	8th	200 m	24.36 (wind: +0.4 m/s)
2015	Asian Championships	Wuhan, China	2nd	4 × 100 m relay	44.14 (relay leg: 2nd)
2015	Universiade	Gwangju, South Korea	7th	100 m	11.70 (wind: +0.4 m/s)
2015	Universiade	Gwangju, South Korea	20th (sf)	200 m	24.64 (wind: -1.3 m/s)
2019	World Relays	Yokohama, Japan	13th (h)	4 × 100 m relay	44.24 (relay leg: 1st)

=== National Championship ===
Year	Competition	Venue	Position	Event	Notes
2011	Japan Championships	Kumagaya, Saitama	4th	100 m	11.82 (wind: -0.6 m/s)
2011	Japan Championships	Yokohama, Kanagawa	14th (h)	4 × 100 m relay	47.38 (relay leg: 4th)
2012	Japan Championships	Osaka, Osaka	2nd	100 m	11.51 (wind: 0.0 m/s)
2013	Japan Championships	Chōfu, Tokyo	3rd	100 m	11.74 (wind: 0.0 m/s)
2013	Japan Championships	Yokohama, Kanagawa	3rd	4 × 100 m relay	46.06 (relay leg: 4th)
2014	Japan Championships	Fukushima, Fukushima	2nd	100 m	11.72 (wind: -0.3 m/s)
2015	Japan Championships	Niigata, Niigata	3rd	100 m	11.83 (wind: -0.3 m/s)
2015	Japan Championships	Yokohama, Kanagawa	7th	4 × 100 m relay	45.75 (relay leg: 2nd)
2016	Japan Championships	Nagoya, Aichi	9th (h)	100 m	12.02 (wind: -1.1 m/s)
2016	Japan Championships	Yokohama, Kanagawa	4th	4 × 100 m relay	45.24 (relay leg: 4th)
2017	Japan Championships	Yokohama, Kanagawa	5th	4 × 100 m relay	45.86 (relay leg: 4th)
