= 2021 Championships of the Small States of Europe =

European athletics competition

2021 Championships of the Small States of Europes
- Dates: 5 June 2021
- Host city: Serravalle, San Marino
- Venue: San Marino Stadium
- Level: Senior
- Events: 22
- Participation: 15 nations

The 2021 Championships of the Small States of Europe was the third edition of the biennial competition Championships of the Small States of Europe organised by the Athletic Association of Small States of Europe (AASE). It was held on 5 June 2021 in Serravalle, San Marino. Originally scheduled for 2020, it was postponed to 2021 due to COVID-19.

== Medal summary ==
=== Men ===
Event	Gold		Silver		Bronze	
100 metres (wind: -0.5 m/s)	Stavros Avgoustinou (CYP)	10.62	Francesco Sansovini (SMR)	10.72	Jovan Stojoski (MKD)	10.76
200 metres (wind: 0.0 m/s)	Alex Beechey (CYP)	21.54	Mindia Endeladze (GEO)	21.55	Razmik Mkrtchyan (ARM)	21.59
400 metres	Franko Burraj (ALB)	46.90	Téo Andant (MON)	47.42	Jovan Stojoski (MKD)	47.44
800 metres	Stavros Spyrou (CYP)	1:50.99	Musa Hajdari (KOS)	1:51.47	Astrit Kryeziu (KOS)	1:52.58
3000 metres	Dario Ivanovski (MKD)	8:09.87	Yervand Mkrtchyan (ARM)	8:14.46	Maxim Răileanu (MDA)	8:20.47
400 m hurdles	Andrea Ercolani Volta (SMR)	53.02	Anastasios Vasileiou (CYP)	53.98	Cristin Eşanu (MDA)	54.97
1000 m medley relay	Cyprus (CYP); Stavros Avgoustinou; Alex Beechey; Anastasios Vasileiou; Stavros Spyrou	1:54.18	Moldova (MDA); Alexei Culiş; Ian-Gheorghe Vieru; Ivan Galuşco; Cristin Eşanu	1:53.63	Luxembourg (LUX); Lionel Evora Delgado; Pol Bidaine; Philippe Hilger; Aymen Djazouli	1:56.10
High jump	Eugenio Rossi (SMR)	2.18	Charel Gaspar (LUX)	2.00	Erydit Rysha (KOS)	1.90
Long jump	Izmir Smajlaj (ALB)	7.80	Gor Beglaryan (ARM)	7.42	Artak Hambardzumyan (ARM)	7.39
Shot put	Giorgi Mujaridze (GEO)	19.91	Tomaš Đurović (MNE)	18.88	Muhamet Ramadani (KOS)	17.69
Javelin throw	Andrian Mardare (MDA)	84.54	Spyros Savva (CYP)	73.09	Bradley Mifsud (MLT)	62.47

=== Women ===
Event	Gold		Silver		Bronze	
100 metres (wind: +0.5 m/s)	Patrizia van der Weken (LUX)	11.58	Marianna Pisiara (CYP)	11.83	Diana Podoleanu (MDA)	12.13
200 metres (wind: +2.2 m/s in heat 1, +0.2 m/s in heat 2)	Patrizia van der Weken (LUX)	24.36	Marianna Pisiara (CYP)	24.59 w	Anaïs Bauer (LUX)	24.82
400 metres	Kalliopi Kountouri (CYP)	55.66	Janet Richard (MLT)	55.88	Mădălina Culea (MDA)	56.95
800 metres	Relaksa Dauti (ALB)	2:16.02	Ellada Alaverdyan (ARM)	2:16.10	Albina Deliu (KOS)	2:16.39
3000 metres	Meropi Panagiotou (CYP)	9:45.25	Martine Mellina (LUX)	9:49.48	Redia Dauti (ALB)	9:53.07
400 m hurdles	Iana Garaeva (MDA)	62.32	Miranta Kyriakou (CYP)	62.35	Beatrice Berti (SMR)	63.37
1000 m medley relay	Malta (MLT); Charlotte Wingfield; Sarah Busuttil; Martha Spiteri; Janet Richard	2:10.79	Cyprus (CYP); Pantelitsa Charalampous; Marianna Pisiara; Miranta Kyriakou; Kalliopi Kountouri	2:12.42	Moldova (MDA); Diana Podoleanu; Tatiana Contrebuţ; Iana Garaeva; Mădălina Culea	2:13.89
High jump	Marija Vuković (MNE)	1.86	Melissa Michelotti (SMR)	1.65	Nadine Lanners (LUX)	1.60
Long jump	Claire Azzopardi (MLT)	6.02	Anastasia Senchiv (MDA)	5.85	Laurence Jones (LUX)	5.77
Shot put	Stéphanie Krumlovsky (LUX)	14.87	Nina Capaţina (MDA)	13.05	Jule Insinna (LIE)	11.57
Javelin throw	Noémie Pleimling (LUX)	51.27	Julia Rohrer (LIE)	41.30	Only 2 finishers	

== Medal table ==
* Host nation (San Marino)

Rank	Nation	Gold	Silver	Bronze	Total
1	Cyprus (CYP)	6	6	0	12
2	Luxembourg (LUX)	4	2	4	10
3	Albania (ALB)	3	0	1	4
4	Moldova (MDA)	2	3	5	10
5	San Marino (SMR)*	2	2	1	5
6	Malta (MLT)	2	1	1	4
7	Georgia (GEO)	1	1	0	2
7	Montenegro (MNE)	1	1	0	2
9	North Macedonia (MKD)	1	0	2	3
10	Armenia (ARM)	0	3	2	5
11	Kosovo (KOS)	0	1	4	5
12	Liechtenstein (LIE)	0	1	1	2
13	Monaco (MON)	0	1	0	1
Totals (13 entries)		22	22	21	65
