= Deborah Oluwaseun Odeyemi =

Nigerian sprinter

Deborah Odeyemi
Personal information
- Full name: Deborah Oluwaseun Odeyemi
- Nationality: Nigeria
- Born: 21 February 1995 (age 31) Nigeria

Sport
- Country: Nigeria
- Sport: Athletics
- Sprint: 100 m 200 m 4 × 100 m Sprint medley relay

Achievements and titles
- Personal best(s): 100 m: 11.45 s (2014); 200 m: 24.49 s (2014)

Deborah Oluwaseun Odeyemi (born 21 February 1995) is a Nigerian sprinter who specializes in the 100 metres, 200 metres, 4 × 100 metres and the sprint medley relay. She competed in the 4 × 100 metres relay event at the 2015 World Championships in Athletics in Beijing, China.

== Doping ==
Odeyemi tested positive for the anabolic steroid metenolone in a sample collected at the Nigerian Championship on 30 July 2015. Her results from the 2015 World Championships in Athletics were annulled and she was handed a four-year ban from sports.
