= Solenn Compper =

French hurdler (born 1995)

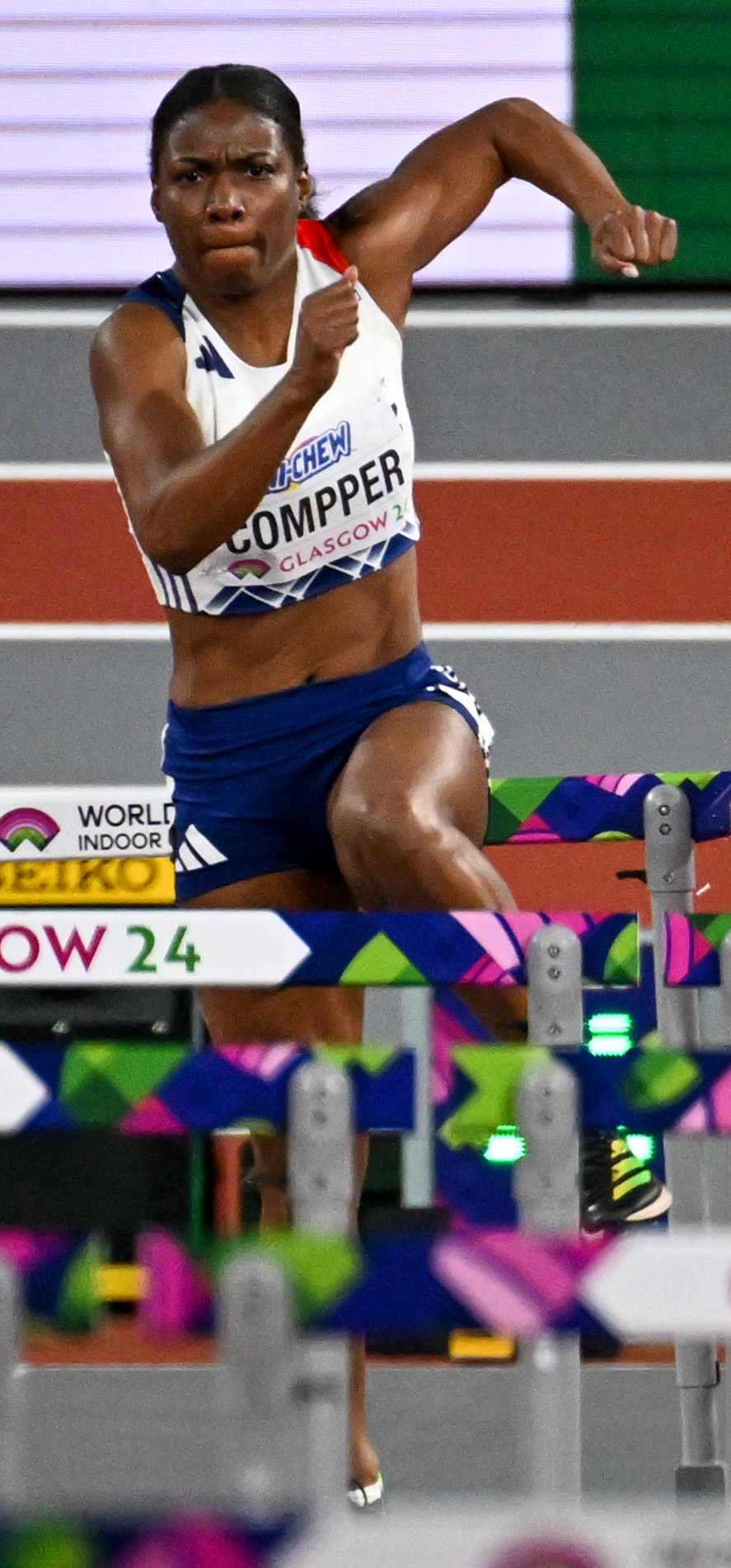
- Solenn Compper in Glasgow, 2024

Personal information
- Nationality: French
- Born: 14 March 1995 (age 31)

Sport
- Sport: Athletics
- Event: Hurdles

Achievements and titles
- Personal best(s): 60m hurdles: 7.96 (Glasgow, 2024); 100m hurdles: 12.92 (Oran, 2022)
Medal record
Representing France
Women's athletics
Mediterranean Games
Gold medal – first place	2022 Oran	100m hurdles

Solenn Compper (born 14 March 1995) is a French track and field athlete who competes as a sprint hurdler. She ran at the 2024 World Athletics Indoor Championships in the 60 metres hurdles.

== Career ==
Compper competed in sprint events, winning a silver medal in the women's 4x 100 metres relay at the 2013 European Junior Championships in Rieti, Italy. In 2018, in consultation with her trainer Alain Lastécouères she moved to the sprint hurdles. The following summer, she finished fourth in the French Athletics Championships in the 100m hurdles, achieving a time of 12.99 seconds. On July 3, 2022, she won the 100m hurdles title at the Mediterranean Games in Oran, bringing her personal best down to 12.92 seconds.

Compper missed the 2023 summer season with injury, and in the September of that year had to change coaches following the retirement of Alain Lastécouères, with Frédéric Demaneche becoming her new coach. In February 2024, she finished in third place in the 60 metres hurdles at the French Indoor Athletics Championships in Miramas. She then won the 60 metres hurdles at the Elite Meeting in Nantes in a time of 8.01 seconds. She was subsequently selected for the French team to compete at the 2024 World Athletics Indoor Championships in Glasgow, Scotland. At the championships, she ran a personal best time of 7.96 seconds and reached the semi-finals. In her semi-final she finished in fourth place in a time of 8.04 seconds.

Compper finished third at the French Indoor Athletics Championships in the 60 metres hurdles in February 2025.

Compper was a finalist in the 60 metres hurdles at the 2026 French Indoor Athletics Championships in Aubiere.
