= Jennifer Madu =

American-Nigerian sprinter

Personal information
- Born: 23 September 1994 (age 31) Garland, Texas, United States
- Education: Texas A&M University
- Height: 1.68 m (5 ft 6 in)
- Weight: 65 kg (143 lb)

Sport
- Country: Nigeria
- Sport: Athletics
- Sprint: 100 m

Achievements and titles
- Personal best(s): 60 m: 7.25 s (2014); 100 m: 11.16 s (2015)
- Updated on 13 August 2016

Jennifer Madu (born 23 September 1994 in Garland, Texas) is a US born Nigerian track and field sprinter.

She represented Nigeria at the Rio 2016 Summer Olympics. She came 5th in Heat 5 of the 100m with a time of 11.61. She also ran the third leg for the Nigerian's 4 × 100 m relay team.
