= Kamila Ciba =

Polish sprinter

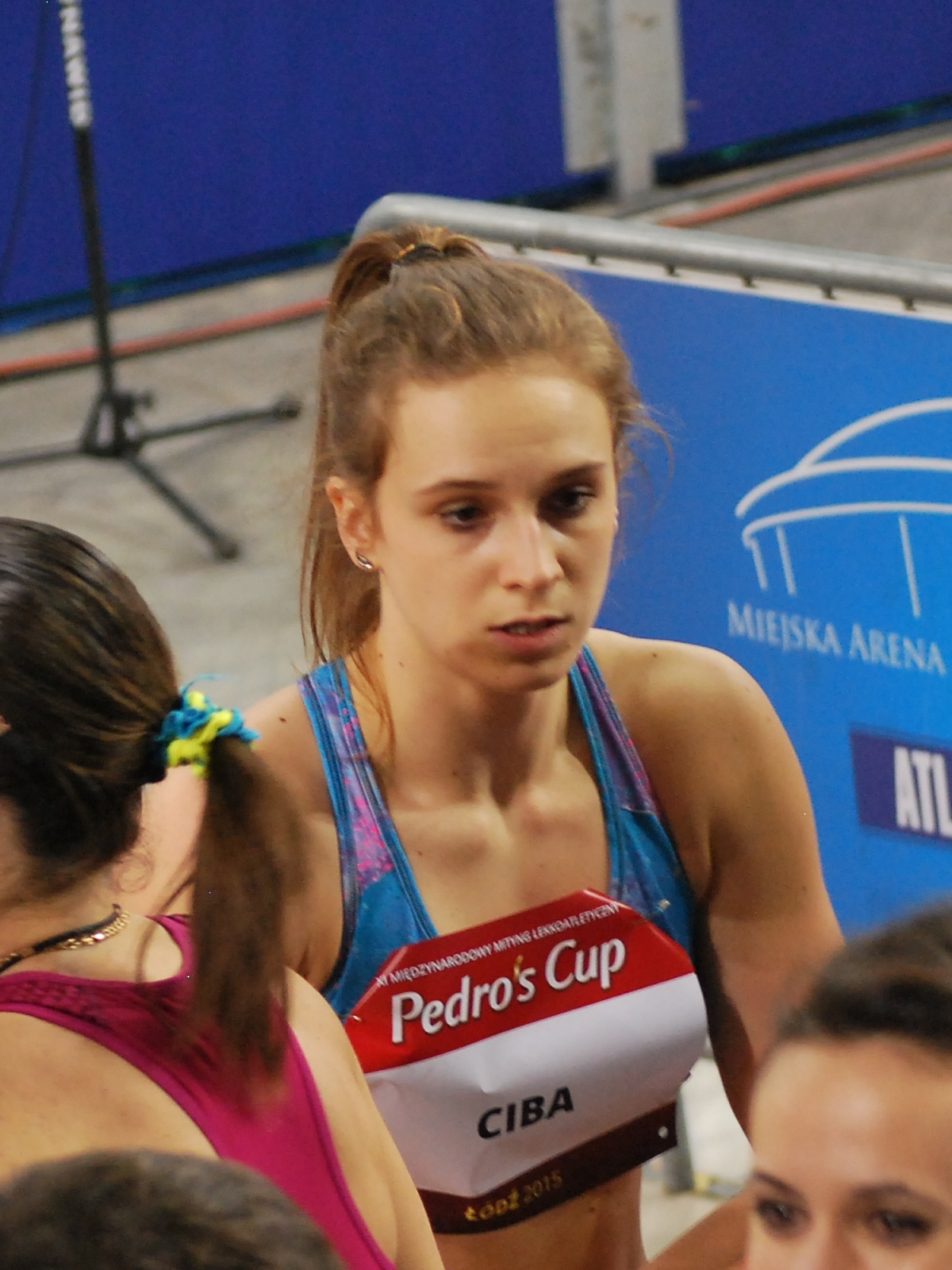

Personal information
- Born: 29 March 1995 (age 31) Poznań, Poland

Sport
- Country: Poland
- Sport: Track and field
- Event: 100 metres
Medal record
Track and field
Representing Poland
World Relay Championships
Gold medal – first place	2021 Chorzów	4 × 200 m relay
European Team Championships
Silver medal – second place	2017 Villeneuve d'Ascq	4 x 100m relay
Summer Universiade
Silver medal – second place	2017 Taipei	4 x 100m relay

Kamila Ciba (born 29 March 1995) is a Polish sprinter who competes in international track and field competitions. She is a silver medalist in the women's 4 × 100 m relay at both the 2017 Summer Universiade in Taipei City and the European Team Championships in Villeneuve d'Ascq.

== Personal bests ==
Outdoor

- 100 metres – 10.72 (+1.9 m/s, Rio De Janeiro 2024)
- 200 metres – 21.80 (+2.0 m/s, Paris 2024)
- 400 meters - 48.89 NR (Rabat 2024)

Indoor

- 60 metres – 7.06 (Toruń 2023)
- 200 metres – 22.20 (Toruń 2021)
- 400 meters - 50.05 NR (Toruń 2024)
