= Janet Richard =

Maltese sprinter

Personal information
- Nationality: Maltese
- Born: 3 July 1998 (age 27)

Sport
- Sport: Athletics
- Event: Sprinting

Janet Richard (born 3 July 1998) is a Maltese athlete. She competed in the women's 400 metres event at the 2019 World Athletics Championships. She did not advance to compete in the semi-finals.
