= Championships of the Small States of Europe =

International sporting competition

The Championships of the Small States of Europe (CSSE) is a biennial competition in outdoor track and field organised by the Athletic Association of Small States of Europe (AASE). First held in 2016, the competition is held on alternate years with the Games of the Small States of Europe.

The idea for a stand-alone athletics championships for European small states arose through discussions with AASE president Edwin Attard and European Athletic Association president Hansjörg Wirz. The European small states traditionally sent a combined team to the European Team Championships, but following that competition's change to a biennial format a gap in the sporting calendar emerged. Competing nations used the competition to help their athletes push for qualifying standards to the European Athletics Championships and Summer Olympics.

The 2020 edition of the competition, originally set for 4–6 June at the San Marino Stadium, was postponed due to the COVID-19 pandemic.

== Editions ==
Ed.	Year	Venue	City	Country	Dates	No. of events	No. of nations	No. of athletes
1st	2016	Matthew Micallef St. John Athletics Stadium	Marsa	Malta	11 June	22	18	c. 300
2nd	2018	Sportanlage Rheinwiese	Schaan	Liechtenstein	9 June	22	18	c. 250
3rd	2021	San Marino Stadium	Serravalle	San Marino	5 June	22	16	
4th	2022	Matthew Micallef St. John Athletics Stadium	Marsa	Malta	11 June	22	16	c.350
5th	2024	Lathbury Athletics Stadium	Gibraltar	Gibraltar	22 June	29	16	
European Challenger Championships
6th	2026	Stade Louis II	Monaco	Monaco	30 May	28	17	

== Participation ==
- Albania
- Andorra
- Armenia
- Azerbaijan
- Bosnia and Herzegovina
- Cyprus
- North Macedonia
- Georgia
- Gibraltar
- Iceland
- Kosovo
- Liechtenstein
- Luxembourg
- Malta
- Moldova
- Monaco
- Montenegro
- San Marino
- Vatican City

== Medal table (2016-2024) ==
Rank	Nation	Gold	Silver	Bronze	Total
1	Cyprus (CYP)	26	27	17	70
2	Iceland (ISL)	21	12	7	40
3	Moldova (MDA)	16	19	15	50
4	Malta (MLT)	10	10	17	37
5	Luxembourg (LUX)	9	5	17	31
6	Albania (ALB)	7	2	4	13
7	Georgia (GEO)	5	4	4	13
8	Armenia (ARM)	4	9	10	23
9	Montenegro (MNE)	4	7	0	11
10	San Marino (SMR)	4	6	2	12
11	Azerbaijan (AZE)	4	3	1	8
12	Kosovo (KOS)	2	3	7	12
13	Gibraltar (GIB)	2	1	2	5
14	North Macedonia (MKD)	2	0	3	5
15	Andorra (AND)	1	3	1	5
16	Monaco (MON)	0	4	1	5
17	Liechtenstein (LIE)	0	1	4	5
18	Bosnia and Herzegovina (BIH)	0	1	2	3
19	Vatican City (VAT)	0	0	1	1
Totals (19 entries)		117	117	115	349

== See also ==
- Games of the Small States of Europe
