= 2017 European Athletics Team Championships =

Sporting event in Eutope

2017 European Team Championships
- Host city: Lille, France (Super League)
- Events: 40
- Dates: 23–25 June 2017

The seventh European Athletics Team Championships were held from 23 to 25 June 2017.

== Super League ==
Place: Stadium Lille Métropole, Lille, France

=== Participating countries ===
- Belarus
- Czech Republic
- France
- Germany
- Great Britain
- Greece
- Italy
- Netherlands
- Poland
- Spain
- Ukraine
- Czech Republic, Greece and Netherlands were promoted from 2015 First League.
- Due to Russia's suspension, the competition is staged with 11 teams only and Russia is one of the three teams to be relegated to the European Athletics Team Championships First League 2019.

=== Men's events ===
Event	Gold		Silver		Bronze	
100 m	Harry Aikines-Aryeetey; United Kingdom	10.21	Julian Reus; Germany	10.27	Churandy Martina; Netherlands	10.30
200 m	Serhiy Smelyk; Ukraine	20.53 SB	Méba-Mickaël Zeze; France	20.57	Lykourgos-Stefanos Tsakonas; Greece	20.59
400 m	Dwayne Cowan; United Kingdom	45.46 PB	Rafał Omelko; Poland	45.53	Davide Re; Italy	45.56 PB
800 m	Thijmen Kupers; Netherlands	1:47.18	Giordano Benedetti; Italy	1:47.94	James Bowness; United Kingdom	1:48.19
1500 m	Marcin Lewandowski; Poland	3:53.40	Jake Wightman; United Kingdom	3:53.72	Timo Benitz; Germany	3:54.28
3000 m	Jakub Holuša; Czech Republic	7:57.60	Marc Scott; United Kingdom	7:58.52 PB	Carlos Mayo; Spain	7:58.97 PB
5000 m	Antonio Abadía; Spain	13:59.40	Nick Goolab; United Kingdom	13:59.72	Amanal Petros; Germany	13:59.83
3000 m steeplechase	Mahiedine Mekhissi-Benabbad; France	8:26.71	Sebastián Martos; Spain	8:27.46	Krystian Zalewski; Poland	8:33.02
110 m hurdles	Orlando Ortega; Spain	13.20 =CR	Aurel Manga; France	13.35	David Omoregie; United Kingdom	13.36
400 m hurdles	Jack Green; United Kingdom	49.47	Sergio Fernández; Spain	49.72	Patryk Dobek; Poland	49.79
4 × 100 m	United Kingdom; Chijindu Ujah; Zharnel Hughes; Danny Talbot; Harry Aikines-Aryeetey	38.08 CR	Germany; Julian Reus; Robert Hering; Roy Schmidt; Aleixo-Platini Menga	38.30	France; Ben Bassaw; Gautier Dautremer; Méba-Mickaël Zeze; Guy-Elphège Anouman	38.68
4 × 400 m	Spain; Óscar Husillos; Lucas Búa; Darwin Andrés Echeverry; Samuel García	3:02.32 EL	Netherlands; Maarten Stuivenberg; Liemarvin Bonevacia; Terrence Agard; Bjorn Blauwhof	3:02.37 NR	Czech Republic; Jan Tesař; Pavel Maslák; Vít Müller; Patrik Šorm	3:03.31
High jump	Mickaël Hanany; France	2.26 SB	Marco Fassinotti; Italy	2.22	Eike Onnen; Germany	2.22
Pole vault	Renaud Lavillenie; France	5.80	Igor Bychkov; Spain; Hendrik Gruber; Germany	5.55		
Long jump	Dan Bramble; United Kingdom	8.00 =SB	Eusebio Cáceres; Spain	7.96	Radek Juška; Czech Republic	7.86
Triple jump	Max Heß; Germany	17.02 =SB	Ben Williams; United Kingdom	16.73 SB	Pablo Torrijos; Spain	16.71
Shot put	Tomáš Staněk; Czech Republic	21.63 CR	David Storl; Germany	21.23 SB	Konrad Bukowiecki; Poland	20.83
Discus	Robert Harting; Germany	66.30 SB	Robert Urbanek; Poland	66.25 SB	Lolassonn Djouhan; France	64.35
Hammer	Paweł Fajdek; Poland	78.29	Pavel Bareisha; Belarus	77.52	Nick Miller; United Kingdom	76.65
Javelin	Jakub Vadlejch; Czech Republic	87.95 CR	Ioánnis Kiriazís; Greece	86.33	Thomas Röhler; Germany	84.22
WR world record | AR area record | CR championship record | GR games record | NR national record | OR Olympic record | PB personal best | SB season best | WL world leading (in a given season)

=== Women's events ===
Event	Gold		Silver		Bronze	
100 m	Carolle Zahi; France	11.19	Gina Lückenkemper; Germany	11.35	Corinne Humphreys; United Kingdom	11.50
200 m	Maria Belibasaki; Greece	22.76 PB	Anna Kiełbasińska; Poland	22.93 PB	Rebekka Haase; Germany	22.98
400 m	Lisanne de Witte; Netherlands	51.71 PB	~~Olha Zemlyak~~; ~~Ukraine~~	DQ	Laura Müller; Germany	52.09
800 m	Olha Lyakhova; Ukraine	2:03.09	Yusneysi Santiusti; Italy	2:03.56	Esther Guerrero; Spain	2:03.70
1500 m	Konstanze Klosterhalfen; Germany	4:09.57	Angelika Cichocka; Poland	4:12.16	Nataliya Pryshchepa; Ukraine	4:13.51 SB
3000 m	Sofia Ennaoui; Poland	9:01.24	Hanna Klein; Germany	9:01.64	Simona Vrzalová; Czech Republic	9:02.77 PB
5000 m	Ana Lozano; Spain	15:18.40	Yuliya Shmatenko; Ukraine	15:30.36 SB	Alina Reh; Germany	15:32.50
3000 m steeplechase	Gesa-Felicitas Krause; Germany	9:27.02	Lennie Waite; United Kingdom	9:43.33 SB	Irene Sánchez-Escribano; Spain	9:43.51
100 m hurdles	Pamela Dutkiewicz; Germany	12.75	Alina Talay; Belarus	12.91	Hanna Plotitsyna; Ukraine	13.05
400 m hurdles	Eilidh Doyle; United Kingdom	54.60 SB	Yadisleidy Pedroso; Italy	55.39 SB	Olena Kolesnychenko; Ukraine	55.51
4 × 100 m	Germany; Lara Matheis; Alexandra Burghardt; Gina Lückenkemper; Rebekka Haase	42.47 CR	Poland; Kamila Ciba; Marika Popowicz-Drapała; Anna Kiełbasińska; Ewa Swoboda	43.07	Ukraine; Olesya Povh; Hrystyna Stuy; Yana Kachur; Yelyzaveta Bryzhina	43.09
4 × 400 m	Poland; Iga Baumgart; Patrycja Wyciszkiewicz; Martyna Dąbrowska; Małgorzata Hołub	3:27.60 EL	Ukraine; Kateryna Klymyuk; Olha Lyakhova; Anastasiya Bryzhina; Olha Zemlyak	3:28.02	Germany; Laura Müller; Nadine Gonska; Hannah Mergenthaler; Ruth Spelmeyer	3:28.47
High jump	Kamila Lićwinko; Poland	1.97 =SB	Marie-Laurence Jungfleisch; Germany	1.97 SB	Michaela Hrubá; Czech Republic; Alessia Trost; Italy	1.94
Pole vault	Katerina Stefanidi; Greece	4.70	Iryna Zhuk; Belarus	4.60 PB	Ninon Guillon-Romarin; France	4.45
Long jump	Claudia Salman; Germany	6.66	Rougui Sow; France	6.45	Maryna Bekh; Ukraine	6.43
Triple jump	Paraskeví Papahrístou; Greece	14.24 SB	Kristin Gierisch; Germany	14.11	Jeanine Assani Issouf; France	14.00
Shot put	Aliona Dubitskaya; Belarus	18.39	Melissa Boekelman; Netherlands	17.72	Paulina Guba; Poland	17.67
Discus	Mélina Robert-Michon; France	62.62	Nadine Müller; Germany	62.57	Hrisoula Anagnostopoulou; Greece	59.28
Hammer	Hanna Malyshchyk; Belarus	74.56	Malwina Kopron; Poland	73.06	Alyona Shamotina; Ukraine	70.02 PB
Javelin	Barbora Špotáková; Czech Republic	65.14 SB	Tatsiana Khaladovich; Belarus	64.60	Marcelina Witek; Poland	60.98 SB
WR world record | AR area record | CR championship record | GR games record | NR national record | OR Olympic record | PB personal best | SB season best | WL world leading (in a given season)

=== Score table ===
Event		BLR	CZE	FRA	GER	GBR	GRE	ITA	NED	POL	ESP	UKR
100 metres	M	1	6	4	10	11	8	5	9	3	7	2
100 metres	W	7	5	11	10	9	6	4	8	0	3	0
200 metres	M	1	8	10	5	7	9	2	3	6	4	11
200 metres	W	7	2	4	9	8	11	1	3	10	6	5
400 metres	M	3	4	8	7	11	2	10	5	-	9	6
400 metres	W	2	1	4	9	6	5	7	11	8	3	10
800 metres	M	7	5	4	3	9	2	10	11	0	6	8
800 metres	W	5	4	2	7	3	6	10	1	8	9	11
1500 metres	M	1	7	8	9	10	2	5	4	11	6	3
1500 metres	W	8	5	4	11	3	1	2	6	10	7	9
3000 metres	M	1	11	8	7	10	2	6	4	3	9	5
3000 metres	W	4	9	1	10	3	2	6	8	11	7	5
5000 metres	M	4	1	6	9	10	3	8	2	7	11	5
5000 metres	W	5	4	8	9	6	1	2	3	7	11	10
3000 metre steeplechase	M	5	2	11	6	8	3	7	4	9	10	1
3000 metre steeplechase	W	4	7	5	11	10	1	8	2	3	9	6
110/100 metre hurdles	M	3	2	10	6	9	7	5	4	8	11	1
110/100 metre hurdles	W	10	2	7	11	6	8	3	0	4.5	4.5	9
400 metre hurdles	M	2	6	7	5	11	1	8	3	9	10	4
400 metre hurdles	W	2	8	6	5	11	4	10	3	7	1	9
4 × 100 metres relay	M	2	3	9	10	11	4	6	7	5	1	8
4 × 100 metres relay	W	3	5	0	11	0	4	8	7	10	6	9
4 × 400 metres relay	M	1	9	7	6	3	2	5	10	8	11	4
4 × 400 metres relay	W	1	2	7	9	8	4	6	5	11	3	10
High jump	M	5	2	11	9	3.5	7.5	10	3.5	7.5	1	6
High jump	W	4.5	8.5	1	10	4.5	7	8.5	2.5	11	2.5	6
Pole vault	M	1	8	11	9.5	4	5	2.5	6	7	9.5	2.5
Pole vault	W	10	8	9	0	6	11	2	7	4	3	5
Long jump	M	4	9	6	2	11	7	5	1	8	10	3
Long jump	W	4	3	10	11	8	2	6	1	7	5	9
Triple jump	M	6	1	8	11	10	7	3	2	5	9	4
Triple jump	W	5	8	9	10	3	11	2	1	7	4	6
Shot put	M	7	11	8	10	2	6	4	1	9	5	3
Shot put	W	11	1	7	8	2	3	5	10	9	6	4
Discus throw	M	3	4	9	11	7	1	5	8	10	6	2
Discus throw	W	1	7	11	10	2	9	6	3	5	4	8
Hammer throw	M	10	0	8	5	9	4	6	2	11	3	7
Hammer throw	W	11	5	8	4	7	2	3	1	10	6	9
Javelin throw	M	8	11	2	9	4	10	5	3	7	1	6
Javelin throw	W	10	11	2	8	3	7	5	1	9	4	6
Country		BLR	CZE	FRA	GER	GBR	GRE	ITA	NED	POL	ESP	UKR
Total		188.5	214.5	270	321.5	269	196.5	221	175	295	242.5	236.5

=== Final standings ===
Pos	Country	Pts	Note
1	Germany	323.5	
2	Poland	292.5	
3	France	274	
4	Great Britain	269	
5	Spain	241	
8	Ukraine	202.5	
6	Italy	224	
7	Czech Republic	217.5	
9	Greece	201.5	
10	Belarus	187.5	Relegation to the 2019 First League
11	Netherlands	179	Relegation to the 2019 First League
–	Russia	Excluded	Relegation to the 2019 First League

== First League ==
Place: Karls' Stadium, Vaasa, Finland

=== Participating countries ===
- Belgium
- Bulgaria
- Denmark
- Estonia
- Finland
- Ireland
- Norway
- Portugal
- Romania
- Sweden
- Switzerland
- Turkey
- Sweden, Finland and Norway were relegated from 2015 Super League.
- Denmark and Bulgaria were promoted from 2015 Second League.

=== Men's events ===
Event	Gold		Silver		Bronze	
100 m	Jonathan Quarcoo; Norway	10.35	Emre Zafer Barnes; Turkey	10.36	Austin Hamilton; Sweden	10.51
200 m	Ramil Guliyev; Turkey	20.20 CR	Alex Wilson; Switzerland	20.55	Samuel Purola; Finland	20.84 PB
400 m	Brian Gregan; Ireland	45.83	Batuhan Altıntaş; Turkey	46.37	Dylan Borlée; Belgium	46.56
800 m	Mark English; Ireland	1:49.02	Andreas Bube; Denmark	1:49.14	Andreas Kramer; Sweden	1:49.57
1500 m	Peter Callahan; Belgium	3:59.09	Levent Ates; Turkey	4:00.13	Andreas Almgren; Sweden	4:00.38
3000 m	Hélio Gomes; Portugal	7:55.94	Ali Kaya; Turkey	7:59.54	Per Svela; Norway	8:02.17
5000 m	Ali Kaya; Turkey	13:36.75 CR	Julien Wanders; Switzerland	13:56.34	Jonas Leandersson; Sweden	14:06.00
3000 m steeplechase	Ole Hesselbjerg; Denmark	8:37.02	Mitko Tsenov; Bulgaria	8:37.47	Topi Raitanen; Finland	8:39.89 PB
110 m hurdles	Andreas Martinsen; Denmark	13.64	Elmo Lakka; Finland	13.86	Hélio Vaz; Portugal	14.23 PB
400 m hurdles	Karsten Warholm; Norway	48.46 CR	Yasmani Copello; Turkey	49.17	Kariem Hussein; Switzerland	49.30
4 × 100 m	Switzerland; Suganthan Somasundaram; Pascal Mancini; Alex Wilson; Sylvain Chuard	39.65	Portugal; Diogo Antunes; David Lima; Ricardo Pereira; Carlos Nascimento	39.89	Norway; Jonas Tapani Halonen; Jonathan Quarcoo; Mathias Hove Johansen; Øyvind Strømmen Kjerpeset	39.91
4 × 400 m	Belgium; Alexander Doom; Robin Vanderbemden; Jonathan Sacoor; Michael Rossaert	3:04.87	Ireland; Christopher O'Donnell; Brian Gregan; Thomas Barr; Mark English	3:05.08	Turkey; Enis Ünsal; Batuhan Altıntaş; Mahsum Korkmaz; Yasmani Copello	3:08.01
High jump	Tihomir Ivanov; Bulgaria	2.30 PB	Samuli Eriksson; Finland	2.15	Paulo Conceição; Portugal	2.15
Pole vault	Diogo Ferreira; Portugal	5.45	Eirik Greibrokk Dolve; Norway	5.30	Urho Kujanpää; Finland	5.30 =SB
Long jump	Michel Tornéus; Sweden	7.85	Kristian Pulli; Finland	7.76	Ingar Kiplesund; Norway	7.74
Triple jump	Simo Lipsanen; Finland	16.75	Georgi Tsonov; Bulgaria	16.24	Nils Wicki; Switzerland	15.70 SB
Shot put	Tsanko Arnaudov; Portugal	21.56 NR	Osman Özdeveci; Turkey	19.27	Arttu Kangas; Finland	19.25
Discus	Daniel Ståhl; Sweden	66.41	Philip Milanov; Belgium	63.27	Sven Martin Skagestad; Norway	61.35
Hammer	David Söderberg; Finland	72.36	Eşref Apak; Turkey	71.53	Eivind Henriksen; Norway	71.33
Javelin	Tero Pitkämäki; Finland	88.27 CR	Magnus Kirt; Estonia	83.60	Alexandru Novac; Romania	81.53
WR world record | AR area record | CR championship record | GR games record | NR national record | OR Olympic record | PB personal best | SB season best | WL world leading (in a given season)

=== Women's events ===
Event	Gold		Silver		Bronze	
100 m	Mujinga Kambundji; Switzerland	11.45	Amy Foster; Ireland	11.70	Lorène Bazolo; Portugal	11.74
200 m	Ivet Lalova-Collio; Bulgaria	23.33	Cornelia Halbheer; Switzerland	23.76	Lorène Bazolo; Portugal	23.76
400 m	Léa Sprunger; Switzerland	51.61	Bianca Răzor; Romania	52.22	Cátia Azevedo; Portugal	52.76
800 m	Lovisa Lindh; Sweden	2:02.36	Selina Büchel; Switzerland	2:02.85	Hedda Hynne; Norway	2:03.68
1500 m	Claudia Bobocea; Romania	4:14.50	Meraf Bahta; Sweden	4:14.51	Meryem Akdağ; Turkey	4:16.60
3000 m	Linn Nilsson; Sweden	9:08.97	Delia Sclabas; Switzerland	9:09.33 PB	Özlem Kaya; Turkey	9:12.09
5000 m	Fabienne Schlumpf; Switzerland	15:47.29 PB	Roxana Bârcă; Romania	15:49.59 SB	Esma Aydemir; Turkey	15:50.23
3000 m steeplechase	Fabienne Schlumpf; Switzerland	9:38.08	Anna Emilie Møller; Denmark	9:39.72	Tuğba Güvenç; Turkey	9:41.03
100 m hurdles	Noemi Zbären; Switzerland	13.28	Grit Šadeiko; Estonia	13.32	Anne Zagré; Belgium	13.36
400 m hurdles	Petra Fontanive; Switzerland	55.53	Amalie Iuel; Norway	55.68	Vera Barbosa; Portugal	56.93
4 × 100 m	Switzerland; Ajla Del Ponte; Samantha Dagry; Mujinga Kambundji; Salomé Kora	43.77	Ireland; Amy Foster; Sharlene Mawdsley; Niamh Whelan; Ciara Neville	44.80	Belgium; Hanne Claus; Camille Laus; Imke Vervaet; Manon Depuydt	45.15
4 × 400 m	Romania; Camelia Florina Gal; Andrea Miklós; Adelina Pastor; Bianca Răzor	3:31.83	Ireland; Sinéad Denny; Phil Healy; Jenna Bromell; Sharlene Mawdsley	3:32.65	Switzerland; Petra Fontanive; Léa Sprunger; Yasmin Giger; Selina Büchel	3:33.10
High jump	Sofie Skoog; Sweden	1.90	Bara Ligia-Damaris; Romania	1.80 SB	Mirela Demireva; Bulgaria	1.80
Pole vault	Nicole Büchler; Switzerland	4.55	Minna Nikkanen; Finland	4.30	Catia Pereira; Portugal	4.15
Long jump	Khaddi Sagnia; Sweden	6.52 SB	Evelise Veiga; Portugal	6.36 SB	Nadia Akpana Assa; Norway	6.28
Triple jump	Patrícia Mamona; Portugal	14.02	Gabriela Petrova; Bulgaria	13.98	Elena Panțuroiu; Romania	13.80
Shot put	Emel Dereli; Turkey	17.97	Radoslava Mavrodieva; Bulgaria	17.81 SB	Fanny Roos; Sweden	17.45
Discus	Irina Rodrigues; Portugal	59.62	Salla Sipponen; Finland	54.97 SB	Kätlin Tõllasson; Estonia	52.37
Hammer	Kıvılcım Kaya; Turkey	69.75	Ida Storm; Sweden	69.12	Merja Korpela; Finland	67.58
Javelin	Liina Laasma; Estonia	57.93	Eda Tuğsuz; Turkey	57.48	Sofi Flink; Sweden	54.93
WR world record | AR area record | CR championship record | GR games record | NR national record | OR Olympic record | PB personal best | SB season best | WL world leading (in a given season)

=== Score table ===
Event		BEL	BUL	DEN	EST	FIN	IRL	NOR	POR	ROU	SWE	SUI	TUR
100 metres	M	6	9	2	1	8	3	12	7	4	10	5	11
100 metres	W	4	0	8	2	9	11	7	10	3	5	12	6
200 metres	M	3	7	2	1	10	5	4	9	6	8	11	12
200 metres	W	8	12	1	2	9	6	7	10	4	3	11	5
400 metres	M	10	1	5	4	2	12	8	6	7	3	9	11
400 metres	W	9	5	1	3	4	8	7	10	11	6	12	2
800 metres	M	7	1	11	5	4	12	9	3	2	10	6	8
800 metres	W	1	2	4	9	8	5	10	3	6	12	11	7
1500 metres	M	12	7	9	4	6	8	3	1	5	10	2	11
1500 metres	W	7	1	9	3	5	4	6	8	12	11	2	10
3000 metres	M	3	2	5	1	4	8	10	12	6	7	9	11
3000 metres	W	7	5	2	1	6	9	8	3	4	12	11	10
5000 metres	M	7	3	2	1	5	4	8	9	6	10	11	12
5000 metres	W	3	2	6	1	8	7	5	4	11	9	12	10
3000 metre steeplechase	M	1	11	12	9	10	2	8	7	4	5	3	6
3000 metre steeplechase	W	2	3	11	1	9	6	4	5	7	8	12	10
110/100 metre hurdles	M	7	4	12	6	11	0	2	10	9	5	8	3
110/100 metre hurdles	W	10	2	1	11	7	5	6	4	9	8	12	3
400 metre hurdles	M	6	1	4	9	7	8	12	5	2	3	10	11
400 metre hurdles	W	9	2	1	3	8	4	11	10	5	7	12	6
4 × 100 metres relay	M	3	6	0	8	7	5	10	11	9	0	12	4
4 × 100 metres relay	W	10	0	0	7	0	11	4	9	5	8	12	6
4 × 400 metres relay	M	12	2	0	6	4	11	8	3	5	9	7	10
4 × 400 metres relay	W	6	3	2	5	7	11	0	9	12	8	10	4
High jump	M	2	12	9.5	4	11	3	5	9.5	7	6	1	8
High jump	W	3.5	10	1	5.5	7.5	9	3.5	5.5	11	12	7.5	2
Pole vault	M	0	2	8.5	4	10	3	11	12	5	8.5	6	7
Pole vault	W	6	2.5	6	2.5	11	1	4	10	6	8	12	9
Long jump	M	7	2	1	4	11	9	10	8	3	12	5	6
Long jump	W	2	4	7	5	8	9	10	11	6	12	3	1
Triple jump	M	5	11	7	6	12	3	1	4	2	8	10	9
Triple jump	W	2	11	0	8	9	7	3	12	10	6	5	4
Shot put	M	7	9	1	4	10	2	5	12	8	6	3	11
Shot put	W	8	11	4	9	5	3	6	2	7	10	1	12
Discus throw	M	11	3	7	5	9	6	10	2	8	12	1	4
Discus throw	W	8	6	9	10	11	2	3	12	0	4	7	5
Hammer throw	M	1	8	3	5	12	7	10	6	2	9	3	11
Hammer throw	W	5	1	3	9	10	2	7	4	8	11	6	12
Javelin throw	M	6	7	2	11	12	3	5	1	10	9	4	8
Javelin throw	W	4	1	6	12	8	2	9	3	5	10	7	11
Country		BEL	BUL	DEN	EST	FIN	IRL	NOR	POR	ROU	SWE	SUI	TUR
Total													

=== Final standings ===
Pos	Country	Pts	Note
1	Sweden	320.5	Promoted to 2019 Super League
2	Finland	314.5	Promoted to 2019 Super League
3	Switzerland	305.5	Promoted to 2019 Super League
4	Turkey	302	
5	Portugal	285	
6	Norway	272.5	
7	Romania	246	
8	Ireland	238	
9	Belgium	232.5	
10	Estonia	203	Relegated to 2019 Second League
11	Bulgaria	193.5	Relegated to 2019 Second League
12	Denmark	187	Relegated to 2019 Second League

== Second League ==
Place: National Sport Center, Tel Aviv, Israel

=== Participating countries ===
- Austria
- Croatia
- Cyprus
- Hungary
- Iceland
- Israel
- Latvia
- Lithuania
- Moldova
- Serbia
- Slovakia
- Slovenia
- Lithuania and Latvia were relegated from 2015 First League.
- Austria, Israel, Moldova and Slovakia were promoted from 2015 Third League.

=== Men's events ===
Event	Gold		Silver		Bronze	
100 m	Ján Volko; Slovakia	10.21	Rytis Sakalauskas; Lithuania	10.30	Zvonimir Ivašković; Croatia	10.44
200 m	Luka Janežič; Slovenia	20.60	Ján Volko; Slovakia	20.61	Imri Persiado; Israel	21.09
400 m	Luka Janežič; Slovenia	45.47	Jānis Leitis; Latvia	45.60 NR	Donald Sanford; Israel	45.76
800 m	Žan Rudolf; Slovenia	1:47.87	Benediktas Mickus; Lithuania	1:48.34	Matus Talan; Slovakia	1:48.42
1500 m	Simas Bertašius; Lithuania	3:44.59	Jozef Repčík; Slovakia	3:44.77	Benjamin Kovács; Hungary	3:44.81
3000 m	Benjamin Kovács; Hungary	8:07.25	Simas Bertašius; Lithuania	8:07.27	Amine Khadiri; Cyprus	8:10.98
5000 m	Amine Khadiri; Cyprus	14:13.22	István Szögi; Hungary	14:13.88	Peter Durec; Slovakia	14:14.22
3000 m steeplechase	Justinas Beržanskis; Lithuania	8:53.29	Balázs Juhász; Hungary	8:53.77	Edgars Sumskis; Latvia	8:54.66
110 m hurdles	Milan Trajkovic; Cyprus	13.31 =NR	Balázs Baji; Hungary	13.39	Milan Ristić; Serbia	13.49
400 m hurdles	Tibor Koroknai; Hungary	49.74	Jānis Baltušs; Latvia	50.98	Dominik Hufnagl; Austria	51.04
4 × 100 m	Hungary; Dániel Szabó; Zalán Kádasi; László Szabó; Tamás Máté	39.97	Israel; Asaf Malka; Dayan Aviv; Omri Harush; Imri Persiado	40.18	Slovakia; Roman Turčáni; Ján Volko; Jakub Matúš; Denis Danac	40.35
4 × 400 m	Slovenia; Gregor Grahovac; Luka Janežič; Žan Rudolf; Jure Grkman	3:08.56	Latvia; Austris Karpinskis; Maksims Sinčukovs; Jānis Baltušs; Jānis Leitis	3:08.65	Croatia; Mateo Parlov; Mateo Kovačić; Gabrijel Stojanović; Mateo Ružić	3:09.27
High jump	Vasilios Constantinou; Cyprus	2.21	Matúš Bubeník; Slovakia	2.19	Péter Bakosi; Hungary	2.16
Pole vault	Ivan Horvat; Croatia	5.70 =NR	Robert Renner; Slovenia	5.50	Nikandros Stylianou; Cyprus	5.40
Long jump	Lazar Anić; Serbia	7.91	István Virovecz; Hungary	7.70	Tomas Veszelka; Slovakia	7.67
Triple jump	Tom Yaacobov; Israel	16.38	Elvijs Misāns; Latvia	16.27	Tomas Veszelka; Slovakia	15.79
Shot put	Šarūnas Banevičius; Lithuania	19.29	Matus Olej; Slovakia	18.01	Matija Carek; Croatia	17.96
Discus	Lukas Weisshaidinger; Austria	65.66	Andrius Gudžius; Lithuania	65.21	Apostolos Parellis; Cyprus	63.49
Hammer	Serghei Marghiev; Moldova	73.37	Marcel Lomnicky; Slovakia	73.26	Bence Halász; Hungary	72.87
Javelin	Andrian Mardare; Moldova	83.93 NR	Edis Matusevičius; Lithuania	80.09	Norbert Rivasz-Tóth; Hungary	76.25
WR world record | AR area record | CR championship record | GR games record | NR national record | OR Olympic record | PB personal best | SB season best | WL world leading (in a given season)

=== Women's events ===
Event	Gold		Silver		Bronze	
100 m	Viola Kleiser; Austria	11.53	Zorana Barjaktarović; Serbia	11.53	Alexandra Bezeková; Slovakia	11.54
200 m	Eleni Artymata; Cyprus	23.39	Alexandra Bezeková; Slovakia	23.52	Agata Zupin; Slovenia	23.57
400 m	Iveta Putalová; Slovakia	52.45	Eleni Artymata; Cyprus	52.48	Tamara Salaški; Serbia	52.55
800 m	Aníta Hinriksdóttir; Iceland	2:02.57	Bianka Kéri; Hungary	2:03.22	Eglė Balčiūnaitė; Lithuania	2:03.65
1500 m	Amela Terzić; Serbia	4:15.93	Natalija Piliušina; Lithuania	4:19.00	Viktória Gyürkes; Hungary	4:19.10
3000 m	Amela Terzić; Serbia	9:15.85	Viktória Gyürkes; Hungary	9:17.97	Maruša Mišmaš; Slovenia	9:18.90
5000 m	Krisztina Papp; Hungary	16:17.99	Lonah Chemtai Salpeter; Israel	16:19.90	Matea Matošević; Croatia	16:24.54
3000 m steeplechase	Zita Kácser; Hungary	10:06:80	Adva Cohen; Israel	10:12:95 NR	Lora Ontl; Croatia	10:39:37
100 m hurdles	Gréta Kerekes; Hungary	13.17	Stephanie Bendrat; Austria	13.20	Ivana Lončarek; Croatia	13.38
400 m hurdles	Agata Zupin; Slovenia	56.80	Arna Stefanía Guðmundsdóttir; Iceland	57.00	Daniela Ledecká; Slovakia	59.06
4 × 100 m	Hungary; Fanny Schmelcz; Éva Kaptur; Gréta Kerekes; Anasztázia Nguyen	44.81	Austria	45.16	Latvia	45.29
4 × 400 m	Slovakia	3:34.05	Slovenia	3:34.19	Lithuania	3:35.69
High jump	Maruša Černjul; Slovenia	1.88	Ekaterina Krasovski; Austria	1.82	Daniela Ledecká; Slovakia; Barbara Szabó; Hungary	1.79
Pole vault	Tina Šutej; Slovenia	4.55	Zsófia Siskó; Hungary	4.20	Hulda Thorsteinsdóttir; Iceland	4.05
Long jump	Jana Velďáková; Slovakia	6.55	Nektaria Panagi; Cyprus	6.40	Ivona Dadic; Austria	6.33
Triple jump	Hanna Knyazyeva-Minenko; Israel	14.17	Dovilė Dzindzaletaitė; Lithuania	13.97	Dana Velďáková; Slovakia	13.66
Shot put	Anita Márton; Hungary	18.09	Dimitriana Surdu; Moldova	17.10	Austra Skujytė; Lithuania	16.20
Discus	Dragana Tomašević; Serbia	59.47	Anita Márton; Hungary	55.55	Zinaida Sendriūtė; Lithuania	53.20
Hammer	Zalina Petrivskaya; Moldova	71.99	Réka Gyurátz; Hungary	70.09	Claudia Stravs; Slovenia	62.57
Javelin	Sara Kolak; Croatia	61.06	Ásdís Hjálmsdóttir; Iceland	60.67	Martina Ratej; Slovenia	60.64
WR world record | AR area record | CR championship record | GR games record | NR national record | OR Olympic record | PB personal best | SB season best | WL world leading (in a given season)

=== Score table ===
Event		AUT	CRO	CYP	HUN	ISL	ISR	LAT	LTU	MDA	SRB	SVK	SLO
100 metres	M	7	10	2	8	6	9	3	11	1	5	12	4
100 metres	W	12	1	7	6	3	9	8	5	4	11	10	2
200 metres	M	3	6	1	7	8	10	9	4	2	5	11	12
200 metres	W	8	3	12	4	2	6	9	5	1	7	11	10
400 metres	M	5	9	3	8	2	10	11	7	1	4	6	12
400 metres	W	4	5	11	6	3	1	7	8	2	10	12	9
800 metres	M	6	8	2	9	3	1	4	11	7	5	10	12
800 metres	W	7	2	9	11	12	1	3	10	4	6	8	5
1500 metres	M	9	1	6	10	2	7	8	12	3	5	11	4
1500 metres	W	8	7	9	10	2	6	3	11	1	12	4	5
3000 metres	M	9	8	10	12		6	7	11				5
3000 metres	W	4	9	7	11	2	8	3	6	5	12	1	10
5000 metres	M	6	4	12	11	5	8	9	2	3	1	10	7
5000 metres	W	3	10	7	12	4	11	5	6	2	9	1	8
3000 metre steeplechase	M	6	2	7	11	5	9	10	12	8	4	3	1
3000 metre steeplechase	W	6	10	8	12	5	11	1	9	2	4	7	3
110/100 metre hurdles	M	8	1	12	11	3	7	5	9	2	10	4	6
110/100 metre hurdles	W	11	10	9	12	1	2	4	5	3	7	8	6
400 metre hurdles	M	10	8	1	12	3	5	11	7	4	2	6	9
400 metre hurdles	W	2	7	1	5	11	3	4	9	8	6	10	12
4 × 100 metres relay	M	6	4	3	12	9	11	7	0	0	5	10	8
4 × 100 metres relay	W	11	3	7	12	6	0	10	5	2	8	9	4
4 × 400 metres relay	M												
4 × 400 metres relay	W												
High jump	M	2.5	6	12	10	2.5	7	4	8	9	5	11	1
High jump	W	11								1			12
Pole vault	M		12	10									11
Pole vault	W	9	8	7	11	10	4	6	2	5	1	3	12
Long jump	M	4	6	3	11	2	8	7	9	1	12	10	5
Long jump	W	10	4	11	8	1	2	7	5	3	6	12	9
Triple jump	M	8	1	7	9	4	12	11	5	2	6	10	3
Triple jump	W	4	8	2	3	0	12	9	11	6	7	10	5
Shot put	M	1	10	2	4	5	7	8	12	6	3	11	9
Shot put	W	1	5	9	12	8	4	6	10	11	2	7	3
Discus throw	M	12	8	10	9	7	4	3	11	5	2	1	6
Discus throw	W	2	5	7	11	6	3	4	10	9	12	1	8
Hammer throw	M	3	7	9	10	1	2	4	6	12	5	11	8
Hammer throw	W	3	7	6	11	5	4	1	2	12	9	8	10
Javelin throw	M	8	7	9	10	2	6	3	11	1	12	4	5
Javelin throw	W	5	12	3	7	11	9	4	8	2	6	1	10
Country		AUT	CRO	CYP	HUN	ISL	ISR	LAT	LTU	MDA	SRB	SVK	SLO
Total		240.5	253.5	258	372.5	181.5	242	258	298.5	168.5	238.5	306.5	296

=== Final standings ===
Pos	Country	Pts	Note
1	Hungary	372.5	Promoted to 2019 First League
2	Slovakia	306.5	Promoted to 2019 First League
3	Lithuania	298.5	Promoted to 2019 First League
4	Slovenia	296	
5	Cyprus	258	
6	Latvia	258	
7	Croatia	253.5	
8	Israel	242	
9	Austria	240.5	
10	Serbia	238.5	Relegated to 2019 Third League
11	Iceland	181.5	Relegated to 2019 Third League
12	Moldova	168.5	Relegated to 2019 Third League

== Third League ==
Place: Matthew Micallef St. John Athletics Stadium, Marsa, Malta

=== Participating countries ===
- AASSE
- Andorra
- Armenia
- Azerbaijan
- Bosnia and Herzegovina
- Georgia
- Luxembourg
- Macedonia
- Malta
- Montenegro

No teams were relegated from the Second League after the 2015 edition in order to enlarge it. Although eligible, Albania and Kosovo did not participate.

=== Men's events ===
Event	Gold		Silver		Bronze	
100 m	Bachana Khorava; Georgia	10.76	Damir Redžepagić; Bosnia and Herzegovina	10.95	Luke Bezzina; Malta	10.99
200 m	Damir Redžepagić; Bosnia and Herzegovina	21.60	Bachana Khorava; Georgia	22.17	Olivier Boussong; Luxembourg	22.33
400 m	Mindia Endeladze; Georgia	48.22	Vincent Karger; Luxembourg	48.31	Tigran Mkrtchyan; Armenia	48.81
800 m	Abedin Mujezinović; Bosnia and Herzegovina	1:51.89	Pol Moya; Andorra	1:52.48	Tigran Mkrtchyan; Armenia	1:53.78
1500 m	Charles Grethen; Luxembourg	3:50.72	Yervand Mkrtchyan; Armenia	3:52.67	Stefan Ćuković; Bosnia and Herzegovina	3:54.72
3000 m	Osman Junuzović; Bosnia and Herzegovina	8:26.77	Daviti Kharazishvili; Georgia	8:30.57	Yervand Mkrtchyan; Armenia	8:32.49
5000 m	Osman Junuzović; Bosnia and Herzegovina	14:56.90	Pol Mellina; Luxembourg	15:00.13	Daviti Kharazishvili; Georgia	15:16.44
3000 m steeplechase	Yervand Mkrtchyan; Armenia	9:09.78	Saba Khvichava; Georgia	9:19.94	Belmin Mrkanović; Bosnia and Herzegovina	9:24.68
110 m hurdles	Rahib Məmmədov; Azerbaijan	14.13	François Grailet; Luxembourg	14.88	Daniel Saliba; Malta	15.87 NR
400 m hurdles	Andrea Ercolani Volta; AASSE	52.63 NR	Jacques Frisch; Luxembourg	53.23	Rusmir Malkočević; Bosnia and Herzegovina	54.03
4 × 100 m	Luxembourg; Felix Jenn; Olivier Boussong; Pol Bidaine; François Grailet	42.04	Malta; Julian Mifsud; Steve Camilleri; Luke Bezzina; Omar Elaida	42.25	Montenegro; Emir Ćatović; Srđan Marić; Milan Nikolić; Kristijan Subotić	42.35
4 × 400 m	Luxembourg; Max Juncker; Vincent Karger; Philippe Hilger; Jacques Frisch	3:14.78	Bosnia and Herzegovina; Damir Redžepagić; Borislav Dragoljević; Stefan Ćuković; Abedin Mujezinović	3:16.75	Georgia; Andranik Matinian; Davit Lukava; Mindia Endaladze; Bachana Khorava	3:19.12
High jump	Zurab Gogochuri; Georgia	2.14	Eugenio Rossi; AASSE	2.10	Kevin Rutare; Luxembourg	2.10
Pole vault	Christophe Tironi; Luxembourg	4.51	Saba Soselia; Georgia	4.36	Miloš Popović; Montenegro	3.91
Long jump	François Grailet; Luxembourg	7.58	Lasha Torgvaidze; Georgia	7.55	Ian Paul Grech; Malta	7.03
Triple jump	Levon Aghasyan; Armenia	15.91	Goga Maglakelidze; Georgia	15.10	Ian Paul Grech; Malta	13.99
Shot put	Hamza Alić; Bosnia and Herzegovina	19.84	Bob Bertemes; Luxembourg	18.92	Tomaš Đurović; Montenegro	18.48
Discus	Ivan Kukuličić; Montenegro	54.42	Giorgi Mujaridze; Georgia	47.66	Manuk Manukyan; Armenia	47.52
Hammer	Goga Tchikhvaria; Georgia	61.41	Ervin Posavljak; Bosnia and Herzegovina	49.44	Mario Mifsud; Malta	47.61
Javelin	Tom Reuter; Luxembourg	70.29	Ro Tchintcharauli; Georgia	68.20	Melik Janoyan; Armenia	58.12
WR world record | AR area record | CR championship record | GR games record | NR national record | OR Olympic record | PB personal best | SB season best | WL world leading (in a given season)

=== Women's events ===
Event	Gold		Silver		Bronze	
100 m	Charlotte Wingfield; Malta	11.81	Patrizia van der Weken; Luxembourg	11.89	Zakiyya Hasanova; Azerbaijan	12.10
200 m	Charlotte Wingfield; Malta	24.37	Zakiyya Hasanova; Azerbaijan	24.58	Gayane Chiloyan; Armenia	24.73
400 m	Alisa Becic; Bosnia and Herzegovina	55.12	Janet Richard; Malta	56.42	Katerina Timchevska; Macedonia	57.67
800 m	Charline Mathias; Luxembourg	2:07.81	Selma Zrnic; Bosnia and Herzegovina	2:10.38	Lilit Harutyunyan; Armenia	2:12.24
1500 m	Vera Hoffmann; Luxembourg	4:28.77	Jelena Gagić; Bosnia and Herzegovina	4:43.06	Lilit Harutyunyan; Armenia	4:45.90
3000 m	Slađana Perunović; Montenegro	9:46.64	Martine Nobili; Luxembourg	10:00.59	Lisa Marie Bezzina; Malta	10:06.96
5000 m	Slađana Perunović; Montenegro	17:12.40	Roberta Schembri; Malta	18:11.62	Martine Mellina; Luxembourg	18:21.82
3000 m steeplechase	Liz Weiler; Luxembourg	11:14.54	Ellada Alaverdyan; Armenia	11:19.33 NR	Monalisa Camilleri; Malta	11:19.60 NR
100 m hurdles	Victoria Rausch; Luxembourg	15.01	Rebecca Fitz; Malta	15.92	Ljiljana Matović; Montenegro	16.46
400 m hurdles	Drita Islami; Macedonia	59.69	Kim Reuland; Luxembourg	1:02.05	Ellada Alaverdyan; Armenia	1:04.11
4 × 100 m	Luxembourg; Victoria Rausch; Patrizia van der Weken; Tiffany Tshilumba; Anais Bauer	46.38	Malta; Sarah Busuttil; Annalise Vassallo; Rachel Fitz; Charlotte Wingfield	46.74	Azerbaijan; Nazan Azmammadi; Yelena Pekhtireva; Alyona Kheyrutdinov; Zakiyya Hasanova	47.36
4 × 400 m						
High jump	Marija Vuković; Montenegro	1.90	Elodie Tshilumba; Luxembourg	1.84	Sara Lučić; Bosnia and Herzegovina	1.80
Pole vault	Peppyna Dalli; Malta	3.31	Martina Muraccini; AASSE	3.31	Lara Buekens; Luxembourg	3.11
Long jump	Ljiljana Matović; Montenegro	5.64	Katarina Ignjić; Bosnia and Herzegovina	5.59	Yelena Pekhtireva; Azerbaijan	5.54
Triple jump	Yekaterina Sariyeva; Azerbaijan	12.79	Iryna Mikituk; Georgia	12.56	Yana Abrahamyan; Armenia	12.43
Shot put	Kristina Rakocevic; Montenegro	14.56	Salome Rigishvili; Georgia	14.48	Gorana Tesanovic; Bosnia and Herzegovina	12.86
Discus	Kristina Rakocevic; Montenegro	55.09	Salome Rigishvili; Georgia	46.42	Gorana Tesanovic; Bosnia and Herzegovina	44.42
Hammer	Hanna Skydan; Azerbaijan	69.54	Stefani Vukaljevic; Bosnia and Herzegovina	54.67	Nino Tsikvadze; Georgia	53.52
Javelin	Vanja Spaić; Bosnia and Herzegovina	52.86 NR	Noémie Pleimling; Luxembourg	46.74	Ana Boskovic; Montenegro	41.51
WR world record | AR area record | CR championship record | GR games record | NR national record | OR Olympic record | PB personal best | SB season best | WL world leading (in a given season)

=== Score table ===
Event		AASSE	AND	ARM	AZE	BIH	GEO	LUX	MKD	MLT	MNE
100 metres	M	3	4	2	0	9	10	6	7	8	5
100 metres	W	3	1	5	8	4	2	9	6	10	7
200 metres	M	4	1	2	3	10	9	8	6	5	7
200 metres	W	2	1	8	9	7	3	5	6	10	4
400 metres	M	3	1	8	7	4	10	9	2	5	6
400 metres	W	4	2	7	0	10	3	6	8	9	5
800 metres	M	2	9	8	0	10	7	6	3	4	5
800 metres	W	0	3	8	0	9	6	10	4	7	5
1500 metres	M	5	6	9	0	8	7	10	4	3	2
1500 metres	W	0	3	8	0	9	7	10	4	6	5
3000 metres	M	4	6	8	0	10	9	7	0	5	3
3000 metres	W	2	3	7	0	6	4	9	5	8	10
5000 metres	M	3	6	0	0	10	8	9	5	7	4
5000 metres	W	0	4	0	0	6	5	8	7	9	10
3000 metre steeplechase	M	6	7	10	0	8	9	5	3	4	2
3000 metre steeplechase	W	0	0	9	0	6	7	10	5	8	4
110/100 metre hurdles	M	4	1	5	10	3	2	9	6	8	7
110/100 metre hurdles	W	0	6	7	0	4	3	10	5	9	8
400 metre hurdles	M	10	4	7	0	8	3	9	5	6	2
400 metre hurdles	W	7	0	8	0	0	4	9	10	6	5
4 × 100 metres relay	M	5	3	4	0	0	7	10	6	9	8
4 × 100 metres relay	W	1	2	6	8	4	3	10	5	9	7
4 × 400 metres relay	M	5	3	0	0	9	8	10	4	6	7
4 × 400 metres relay	W										
High jump	M	9	2	0	6	7	10	8	5	3.5	3.5
High jump	W	7	5	2	0	8	6	9	4	3	10
Pole vault	M	0	0	0	0	0	9	10	0	7	8
Pole vault	W	9	7	0	0	0	0	8	0	10	0
Long jump	M	2	3	6	7	4	9	10	5	8	1
Long jump	W	3	2	6	8	9	1	4	7	5	10
Triple jump	M	0	3	10	0	7	9	4	5	8	6
Triple jump	W	1	3	8	10	5	9	4	2	7	6
Shot put	M	0	3	6	4	10	7	9	5	0	8
Shot put	W	3	2	6	0	8	9	7	4	5	10
Discus throw	M	0	4	8	0	6	9	5	3	7	10
Discus throw	W	5	2	7	0	8	9	3	4	6	10
Hammer throw	M	0	5	4	0	9	10	6	3	8	7
Hammer throw	W	1	3	6	10	9	8	7	2	5	4
Javelin throw	M	0	5	8	0	3	9	10	6	4	7
Javelin throw	W	5	3	4	0	10	7	9	2	6	8
Country		AASSE	AND	ARM	AZE	BIH	GEO	LUX	MKD	MLT	MNE
Total											

=== Final standings ===
After 40/40 events

Pos	Country	Pts	Note
1	Luxembourg	317	Promoted to 2019 Second League
2	Georgia	262	Promoted to 2019 Second League
3	Malta	261.5	Promoted to 2019 Second League
4	Bosnia and Herzegovina	261*	
5	Montenegro	245.5	
6	Armenia	218	
7	Macedonia	181	
8	Andorra	133	
9	AASSE	119	
10	Azerbaijan	80	

- Promotion was given to Malta following a failed doping test by an athlete (Adela Čomor, BIH).
