= Athletics at the 2017 Games of the Small States of Europe =

Athletics at the 17th Games of the Small States of Europe
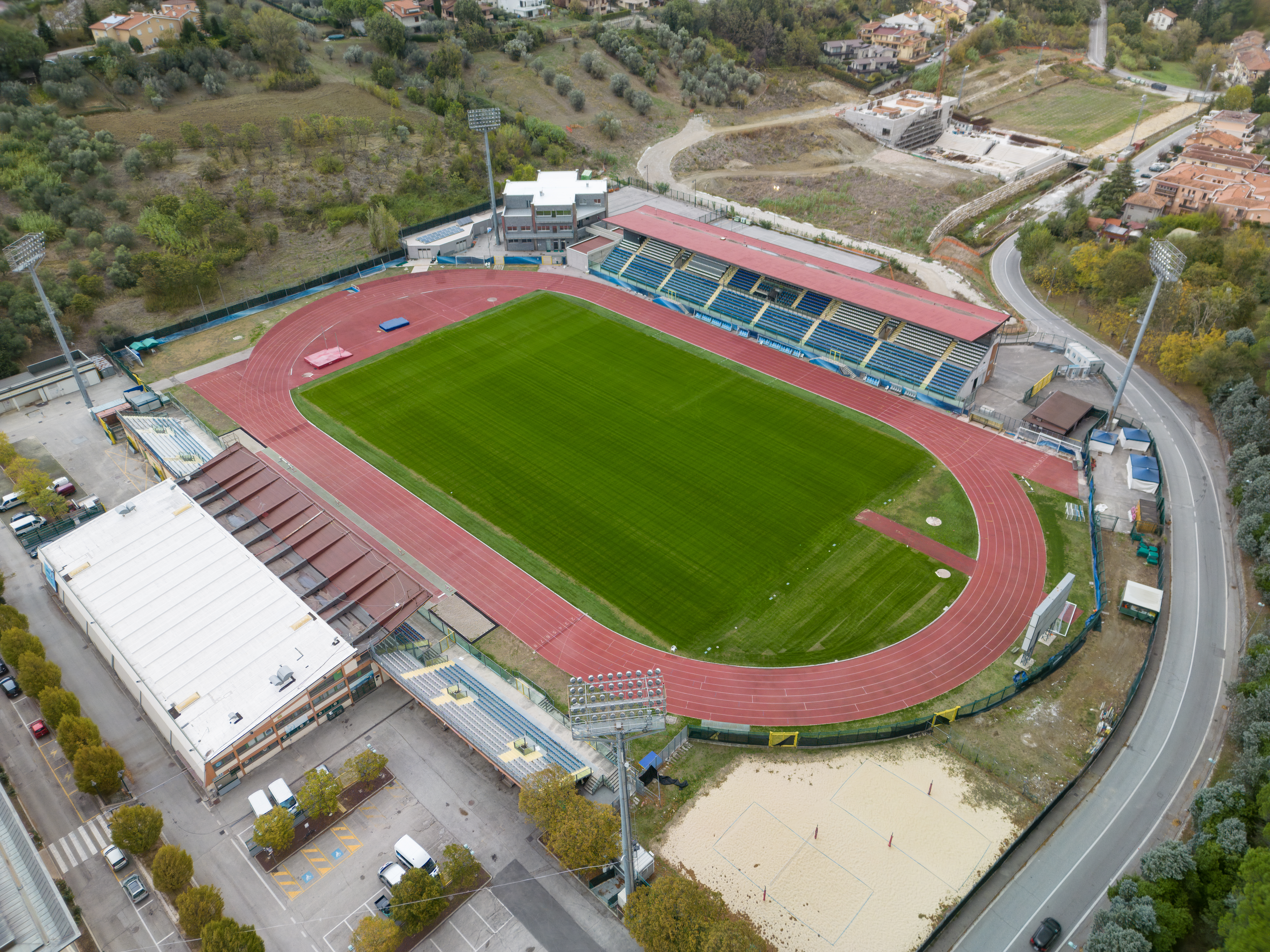
- Host stadium in Serravalle.
- Dates: 30 May–3 June 2017
- Host city: Serravalle, San Marino
- Venue: San Marino Stadium
- Events: 37
- Participation: 166 athletes from 9 nations

The Athletics competition at the 2017 Games of the Small States of Europe was held in San Marino Stadium in Serravalle from 30 May to 3 June 2017.

== Medal table ==
* Host nation (San Marino)

| Rank | Nation | Gold | Silver | Bronze | Total |
|---|---|---|---|---|---|
| 1 | Cyprus (CYP) | 14 | 13 | 5 | 32 |
| 2 | Iceland (ISL) | 11 | 8 | 5 | 24 |
| 3 | Luxembourg (LUX) | 5 | 8 | 8 | 21 |
| 4 | Montenegro (MNE) | 4 | 2 | 3 | 9 |
| 5 | Malta (MLT) | 2 | 1 | 3 | 6 |
| 6 | Monaco (MON) | 1 | 1 | 3 | 5 |
| 7 | Andorra (AND) | 0 | 3 | 6 | 9 |
| 8 | San Marino (SMR)* | 0 | 1 | 3 | 4 |
| Totals (8 entries) | | 37 | 37 | 36 | 110 |

== Participating nations ==
- Andorra (11)
- Cyprus (35)
- Iceland (23)
- Liechtenstein (1)
- Luxembourg (32)
- Malta (18)
- Monaco (23)
- Montenegro (6)
- San Marino (17)

== Medalists ==
=== Men ===
| Event | Gold | | Silver | | Bronze | |
|---|---|---|---|---|---|---|
| 100 m | Paisios Dimitriadis; Cyprus | 10.63 | Andreas Chatzitheori; Cyprus | 10.80 | Ari Bragi Kárason; Iceland | 10.81 |
| 200 m | Kolbeinn Höður Gunnarsson; Iceland | 21.20 | Paisios Dimitriadis; Cyprus | 21.33 | Ari Bragi Kárason; Iceland | 21.78 |
| 400 m | Téo Andant; Monaco | 47.52 | Ívar Kristinn Jasonarson; Iceland | 48.28 | Philippe Hilger; Luxembourg | 48.75 |
| 800 m | Christos Dimitriou; Cyprus | 1:50.45 | Charles Grethen; Luxembourg | 1:50.70 | Pol Moya; Andorra | 1:50.72 |
| 1500 m | Christos Dimitriou; Cyprus | 4:00.36 | Pol Moya; Andorra | 4:01.06 | Theofanis Michaelas; Cyprus | 4:01.26 |
| 5000 m | Amine Khadiri; Cyprus | 14:21.35 | Pol Mellina; Luxembourg | 14:26.90 | Marcos Sanza; Andorra | 14:41.04 |
| 10000 m | Pol Mellina; Luxembourg | 30:46.61 | Marcos Sanza; Andorra | 31:04.74 | Antoni Bernadó; Andorra | 33:56.17 |
| 110 m hurdles | Nikandros Stylianou; Cyprus | 15.93 | Jesse Aliaga-Jacob; Monaco | 16.29 | not awarded | |
| 400 m hurdles | Jacques Frisch; Luxembourg | 52.16 | Ívar Kristinn Jasonarson; Iceland | 52.67 | Andrea Ercolani Volta; San Marino | 53.07 NR |
| 3000 m steeplechase | Nikolas Fragkou; Cyprus | 9:08.18 | Nahuel Carabaña; Andorra | 9:16.96 | Joseph Guerra; San Marino | 9:35.08 |
| 4 × 100 m relay | Iceland; Trausti Stefánsson; Ívar Kristinn Jasonarson; Kolbeinn Höður Gunnarsson; Ari Bragi Kárason | 40.45 NR | Cyprus; Fotis Ioannou; Kritonas Kyriakides; Andrea Chatzitheori; Paisios Dimitriadis | 41.60 | Monaco; Thomas Caredda; Thomas Mironenko; Hugo Marbotte; Michel Arlanda | 41.75 |
| 4 × 400 m relay | Luxembourg; Olivier Boussong; Vincent Karger; Philippe Hilger; Jacques Frisch | 3:15.03 | Cyprus; Andreas Christoforou; Onisiforos Anastasiou; Andreas Misiara; Christos Dimitriou | 3:15.15 | Monaco; Giovanni Molino; Marvin Bouilly; Brice Etès; Téo Andant | 3:15.46 |
| High jump | Vasilios Konstantinou; Cyprus | 2.21 m | Eugenio Rossi; San Marino | 2.18 m | Kevin Rutare; Luxembourg | 2.18 m |
| Pole vault | Nikandros Stylianou; Cyprus | 5.55 m GR | Joe Seil; Luxembourg | 5.05 m | Sébastien Hoffelt; Luxembourg | 5.00 m |
| Long jump | Þorsteinn Ingvarsson; Iceland | 7.54 m | Kristinn Torfason; Iceland | 7.42 m | Mathaios Volou; Cyprus | 7.19 m |
| Triple jump | Panagiotis Volou; Cyprus | 15.76 m | Loginos Achileos; Cyprus | 14.99 m | Ian Paul Grech; Malta | 14.78 m |
| Shot put | Bob Bertemes; Luxembourg | 19.33 m | Tomaš Đurović; Montenegro | 18.80 m | Óðinn Björn Þorsteinsson; Iceland | 17.59 m |
| Discus throw | Guðni Valur Guðnason; Iceland | 59.98 m | Andreas Christou; Cyprus | 59.74 m | Ivan Kukulicic; Montenegro | 56.40 m |
| Javelin throw | Örn Davíðsson; Iceland | 74.81 m | Tom Reuter; Luxembourg | 71.89 m | Guðmundur Sverrisson; Iceland | 71.27 m |

=== Women ===
| Event | Gold | | Silver | | Bronze | |
|---|---|---|---|---|---|---|
| 100 m | Charlotte Wingfield; Malta | 11.62 | Patrizia Van der Weken; Luxembourg | 11.86 | Paraskevi Andreou; Cyprus | 12.04 |
| 200 m | Charlotte Wingfield; Malta | 23.78 | Gudbjörg Jóna Bjarnadóttir; Iceland | 24.13 | Patrizia Van der Weken; Luxembourg | 24.32 |
| 400 m | Christiana Katsari; Cyprus | 55.01 | Gudbjörg Jóna Bjarnadóttir; Iceland | 55.72 | Kalliopi Kountouri; Cyprus | 57.06 |
| 800 m | Natalia Evangelidou; Cyprus | 2:06.62 | Vera Hoffmann; Luxembourg | 2:09.00 | Dayane Huerta; Andorra | 2:10.56 |
| 1500 m | Charline Mathias; Luxembourg | 4:21.59 GR | Natalia Evangelidou; Cyprus | 4:22.15 | Dayane Huerta; Andorra | 4:30.11 |
| 5000 m | Slađana Perunović; Montenegro | 17:04.19 | Meropi Panagiotou; Cyprus | 17:15.73 | Dagmara Handzlik; Cyprus | 17:21.86 |
| 10000 m | Arndís Ýr Hafthorsdóttir; Iceland | 36:59.69 | Dagmara Handzlik; Cyprus | 37:10.12 | Slađana Perunović; Montenegro | 38:00.10 |
| 100 m hurdles | Natalia Christofi; Cyprus | 13.64 | Lara Marx; Luxembourg | 14.20 | Victoria Rausch; Luxembourg | 14.30 |
| 400 m hurdles | Arna Stefanía Guðmundsdóttir; Iceland | 59.14 | Kim Reuland; Luxembourg | 1:01.83 | Lise Boryna; Monaco | 1:03.51 |
| 4 × 100 m relay | Iceland; Tiana Ósk Whitworth; Hrafnhild Eir Hermódsdóttir; Guðbjörg Bjarnadóttir; Arna Stefanía Guðmundsdóttir | 45.31 NR GR | Malta; Sarah Busuttil; Annalise Vassallo; Rachel Fitz; Charlotte Wingfield | 46.31 | Luxembourg; Lara Marx; Patrizia Van der Weken; Victoria Rausch; Anais Bauer | 46.68 |
| 4 × 400 m relay | Iceland; María Rún Gunnlaugsdóttir; Hrafnhild Eir Hermódsdóttir; Guðbjörg Bjarnadóttir; Arna Stefanía Guðmundsdóttir | 3:47.64 | Cyprus; Sanda Colomeiteva; Natalia Evangelidou; Kalliopi Kountouri; Christiana Katsari | 3:48.63 | not awarded | |
| High jump | Marija Vuković; Montenegro | 1.91 m GR | María Rún Gunnlaugsdóttir; Iceland | 1.71 m | Claudia Guri; Andorra | 1.68 m |
| High jump | Marija Vuković; Montenegro | 1.91 m GR | María Rún Gunnlaugsdóttir; Iceland | 1.71 m | Melissa Michelotti; San Marino | 1.68 m |
| Pole vault | Hulda Þorsteinsdóttir; Iceland | 4.20 m | Maria Aristotelous; Cyprus | 4.10 m | Edna Semedo Monteiro; Luxembourg | 3.80 m |
| Long jump | Ljiljana Matović; Montenegro | 5.64 m | María Rún Gunnlaugsdóttir; Iceland | 5.53 m | Rebecca Saré; Malta | 5.33 m |
| Triple jump | Eleftheria Christofi; Cyprus | 12.16 m | Ljiljana Matović; Montenegro | 11.64 m | Rebecca Saré; Malta | 11.62 m |
| Shot put | Gavriella Fella; Cyprus | 15.81 m GR | Ásdís Hjálmsdóttir; Iceland | 15.39 m | Kristina Rakočević; Montenegro | 14.56 m |
| Discus throw | Kristina Rakočević; Montenegro | 53.79 m GR | Androniki Lada; Cyprus | 50.01 m | Thelma Kristjánsdóttir; Iceland | 49.38 m |
| Javelin throw | Ásdís Hjálmsdóttir; Iceland | 60.03 m GR | Marielle Rousi; Cyprus | 49.16 m | Noemie Pleimling; Luxembourg | 47.29 m |

== Men's results ==
=== 100 metres ===
Heats – 30 May
Wind:
Heat 1: +0.7 m/s, Heat 2: +0.4 m/s

| Rank | Heat | Name | Team | Time | Notes |
|---|---|---|---|---|---|
| 1 | 1 | Kolbeinn Höður Gunnarsson | Iceland | 10.62 | Q |
| 2 | 2 | Paisios Dimitriadis | Cyprus | 10.65 | Q |
| 3 | 1 | Andreas Chatzitheori | Cyprus | 10.79 | Q |
| 4 | 2 | Ari Bragi Kárason | Iceland | 10.85 | Q |
| 5 | 1 | Luke Bezzina | Malta | 10.96 | q |
| 6 | 2 | Francesco Molinari | San Marino | 11.05 | q |
| 7 | 2 | Pol Bidaine | Luxembourg | 11.10 | q |
| 8 | 2 | Thomas Caredda | Monaco | 11.12 | q |
| 9 | 1 | Thomas Mironenko | Monaco | 11.15 | |
| 10 | 1 | Mikel de Sa | Andorra | 11.17 | |
| 11 | 1 | Manuel Battistini | San Marino | 11.23 | |
| 12 | 2 | Lionel Evora Delgado | Luxembourg | 11.41 | |

Final – 30 May
Wind:
+0.7 m/s

| Rank | Lane | Name | Team | Time | Notes |
|---|---|---|---|---|---|
| 1st place, gold medalist(s) | 6 | Paisios Dimitriadis | Cyprus | 10.63 | |
| 2nd place, silver medalist(s) | 4 | Andreas Chatzitheori | Cyprus | 10.80 | |
| 3rd place, bronze medalist(s) | 5 | Ari Bragi Kárason | Iceland | 10.81 | |
| 4 | 7 | Luke Bezzina | Malta | 10.90 | |
| 5 | 8 | Francesco Molinari | San Marino | 10.95 | |
| 6 | 1 | Pol Bidaine | Luxembourg | 11.08 | |
| 7 | 2 | Thomas Caredda | Monaco | 11.16 | |
| | 3 | Kolbeinn Höður Gunnarsson | Iceland | DQ | R162.6 |

=== 200 metres ===
Heats – 1 June
Wind:
Heat 1: +0.6 m/s, Heat 2: +0.3 m/s

| Rank | Heat | Name | Team | Time | Notes |
|---|---|---|---|---|---|
| 1 | 1 | Paisios Dimitriadis | Cyprus | 21.63 | Q |
| 2 | 2 | Kolbeinn Höður Gunnarsson | Iceland | 21.78 | Q |
| 3 | 1 | Ari Bragi Kárason | Iceland | 22.03 | Q |
| 4 | 1 | Olivier Boussong | Luxembourg | 22.18 | q |
| 4 | 2 | Andreas Chatzitheori | Cyprus | 22.18 | Q |
| 6 | 1 | Luke Bezzina | Malta | 22.24 | q |
| 7 | 2 | Pol Bidaine | Luxembourg | 22.41 | q |
| 8 | 1 | Hugo Marbotte | Monaco | 22.55 | q |
| 9 | 1 | Davide Balducci | San Marino | 22.91 | |
| 10 | 2 | Mikel de Sa | Andorra | 22.99 | |
| 11 | 2 | Michel Arlanda | Monaco | 23.14 | |
| 12 | 2 | Francesco Sansovini | San Marino | 23.19 | |

Final – 3 June
Wind:
-0.1 m/s

| Rank | Lane | Name | Team | Time | Notes |
|---|---|---|---|---|---|
| 1st place, gold medalist(s) | 4 | Kolbeinn Höður Gunnarsson | Iceland | 21.20 | |
| 2nd place, silver medalist(s) | 5 | Paisios Dimitriadis | Cyprus | 21.33 | |
| 3rd place, bronze medalist(s) | 6 | Ari Bragi Kárason | Iceland | 21.78 | |
| 4 | 3 | Andreas Chatzitheori | Cyprus | 21.93 | |
| 5 | 7 | Olivier Boussong | Luxembourg | 22.10 | |
| 6 | 8 | Luke Bezzina | Malta | 22.34 | |
| 7 | 2 | Pol Bidaine | Luxembourg | 22.58 | |
| 8 | 1 | Hugo Marbotte | Monaco | 23.79 | |

=== 400 metres ===
Heats – 30 May

| Rank | Heat | Name | Team | Time | Notes |
|---|---|---|---|---|---|
| 1 | 1 | Téo Andant | Monaco | 47.88 | Q |
| 2 | 1 | Ívar Kristinn Jasonarson | Iceland | 48.85 | Q |
| 3 | 1 | Vincent Karger | Luxembourg | 49.28 | q |
| 4 | 1 | Alessandro Gasperoni | San Marino | 49.56 | q |
| 5 | 2 | Andreas Mishiara | Cyprus | 49.65 | Q |
| 6 | 2 | Philippe Hilger | Luxembourg | 49.70 | Q |
| 7 | 1 | Giovanni Molino | Monaco | 49.73 | q |
| 8 | 2 | Onisiforos Anastasion | Cyprus | 49.93 | q |
| 9 | 2 | Trausti Stefánsson | Iceland | 50.30 | |
| 10 | 2 | Matthew Croker | Malta | 50.77 | |

Final – 1 June

| Rank | Lane | Name | Team | Time | Notes |
|---|---|---|---|---|---|
| 1st place, gold medalist(s) | 4 | Téo Andant | Monaco | 47.52 | |
| 2nd place, silver medalist(s) | 6 | Ívar Kristinn Jasonarson | Iceland | 48.28 | |
| 3rd place, bronze medalist(s) | 5 | Philippe Hilger | Luxembourg | 48.75 | |
| 4 | 7 | Vincent Karger | Luxembourg | 49.07 | |
| 5 | 1 | Onisiforos Anastasion | Cyprus | 49.51 | |
| 6 | 8 | Alessandro Gasperoni | San Marino | 49.62 | |
| 7 | 2 | Giovanni Molino | Monaco | 49.83 | |
| 8 | 3 | Andreas Mishiara | Cyprus | 49.99 | |

=== 800 metres ===
30 May

| Rank | Name | Team | Time | Notes |
|---|---|---|---|---|
| 1st place, gold medalist(s) | Christos Dimitriou | Cyprus | 1:50.45 | |
| 2nd place, silver medalist(s) | Charles Grethen | Luxembourg | 1:50.70 | |
| 3rd place, bronze medalist(s) | Pol Moya | Andorra | 1:50.72 | |
| 4 | Kristinn Thór Kristinsson | Iceland | 1:52.32 | |
| 5 | Theofanis Michaelas | Cyprus | 1:52.33 | |
| 6 | Carles Gómez | Andorra | 1:54.82 | |
| 7 | Christophe Bestgen | Luxembourg | 1:55.01 | |
| 8 | Matthew Croker | Malta | 1:55.60 | |
| 9 | Bjartmar Örnuson | Iceland | 1:55.64 | |
| 10 | Marvin Bouilly | Monaco | 1:59.62 | |
| 11 | Louis Catteau | Monaco | 2:04.53 | |

=== 1500 metres ===
1 June

| Rank | Name | Team | Time | Notes |
|---|---|---|---|---|
| 1st place, gold medalist(s) | Christos Dimitriou | Cyprus | 4:00.36 | |
| 2nd place, silver medalist(s) | Pol Moya | Andorra | 4:01.06 | |
| 3rd place, bronze medalist(s) | Theofanis Michaelas | Cyprus | 4:01.26 | |
| 4 | Bob Bertemes | Luxembourg | 4:02.23 | |
| 5 | Kristinn Thór Kristinsson | Iceland | 4:02.49 | |
| 6 | Carles Gómez | Andorra | 4:04.17 | |
| 7 | Bjartmar Örnuson | Iceland | 4:04.61 | |
| 8 | Louis Catteau | Monaco | 4:09.58 | |
| 9 | Kaïs Adli | Monaco | 4:10.35 | |

=== 5000 metres ===
30 May

| Rank | Name | Team | Time | Notes |
|---|---|---|---|---|
| 1st place, gold medalist(s) | Amine Khadiri | Cyprus | 14:21.35 | |
| 2nd place, silver medalist(s) | Pol Mellina | Luxembourg | 14:26.90 | |
| 3rd place, bronze medalist(s) | Marcos Sanza | Andorra | 14:41.04 | |
| 4 | Chalton Debono | Malta | 14:57.88 | |
| 5 | Nicolas Toscan | Monaco | 15:19.26 | |
| 6 | Antoni Bernadó | Andorra | 15:28.69 | |
| 7 | Gregory Giuffra | Monaco | 15:33.95 | |

=== 10,000 metres ===
3 June

| Rank | Name | Team | Time | Notes |
|---|---|---|---|---|
| 1st place, gold medalist(s) | Pol Mellina | Luxembourg | 30:46.61 | |
| 2nd place, silver medalist(s) | Marcos Sanza | Andorra | 31:04.74 | |
| 3rd place, bronze medalist(s) | Antoni Bernadó | Andorra | 33:56.17 | |
| 4 | Omar Bachir | Monaco | 35:08.55 | |
| 5 | Matteo Felici | San Marino | 35:42.54 | |
| | Chalton Debono | Malta | DNF | |

=== 110 metres hurdles ===
3 June
Wind: +1.0 m/s

| Rank | Lane | Name | Team | Time | Notes |
|---|---|---|---|---|---|
| 1st place, gold medalist(s) | 4 | Nikandros Stylianou | Cyprus | 15.93 | |
| 2nd place, silver medalist(s) | 3 | Jesse Aliaga-Jacob | Monaco | 16.29 | |
| 3 | 5 | Cadogan Abada | Monaco | 16.36 | |

=== 400 metres hurdles ===
1 June

| Rank | Lane | Name | Team | Time | Notes |
|---|---|---|---|---|---|
| 1st place, gold medalist(s) | 5 | Jacques Frisch | Luxembourg | 52.16 | |
| 2nd place, silver medalist(s) | 6 | Ívar Kristinn Jasonarson | Iceland | 52.67 | |
| 3rd place, bronze medalist(s) | 3 | Andrea Ercolani Volta | San Marino | 53.07 | NR |
| 4 | 4 | Daniel Saliba | Malta | 55.82 | |
| 5 | 8 | Elia Genghini | San Marino | 58.97 | |
| 6 | 7 | Pierre-Marie Arnaud | Monaco | 1:09.55 | |
| | 2 | Jesse Aliaga-Jacob | Monaco | DNF | |

=== 3000 metres steeplechase ===
1 June

| Rank | Name | Team | Time | Notes |
|---|---|---|---|---|
| 1st place, gold medalist(s) | Nikolas Fragkou | Cyprus | 9:08.18 | |
| 2nd place, silver medalist(s) | Nahuel Carabaña | Andorra | 9:16.96 | |
| 3rd place, bronze medalist(s) | Joseph Guerra | San Marino | 9:35.08 | |
| 4 | Jamal Baaziz | Monaco | 9:42.58 | |
| | Zouhair Ouerdi | Monaco | DNF | |

=== 4 × 100 meters relay ===
3 June

| Rank | Lane | Nation | Competitors | Time | Notes |
|---|---|---|---|---|---|
| 1st place, gold medalist(s) | 3 | Iceland | Trausti Stefánsson, Ívar Kristinn Jasonarson, Kolbeinn Höður Gunnarsson, Ari Bragi Kárason | 40.45 | |
| 2nd place, silver medalist(s) | 7 | Cyprus | Fotis Ioannou, Kritonas Kyriakides, Andrea Chatzitheori, Paisios Dimitriadis | 41.60 | |
| 3rd place, bronze medalist(s) | 5 | Monaco | Thomas Caredda, Thomas Mironenko, Hugo Marbotte, Michel Arlanda | 41.75 | |
| 4 | 4 | San Marino | Francesco Sansovini, Alessandro Gasperoni, Francesco Molinari, Manuel Battistini | 42.25 | |
| 5 | 6 | Andorra | Mikel de Sa, Miquel Vilchez, Leonard Sangra, Kevin Poulet | 44.59 | |

=== 4 × 400 meters relay ===
3 June

| Rank | Nation | Competitors | Time | Notes |
|---|---|---|---|---|
| 1st place, gold medalist(s) | Luxembourg | Olivier Boussong, Vincent Karger, Philippe Hilger, Jacques Frisch | 3:15.03 | |
| 2nd place, silver medalist(s) | Cyprus | Andreas Christoforou, Onisiforos Anastasiou, Andreas Misiara, Christos Dimitriou | 3:15.15 | |
| 3rd place, bronze medalist(s) | Monaco | Giovanni Molino, Marvin Bouilly, Brice Etès, Téo Andant | 3:15.46 | |
| 4 | Iceland | Kolbeinn Höður Gunnarsson, Kristinn Thór Kristinsson, Ívar Kristinn Jasonarson, Bjartmar Örnuson | 3:17.19 | |
| 5 | San Marino | Andrea Ercolani Volta, Alessandro Gasperoni, Elia Genghini, Francesco Molinari | 3:23.28 | |
| | Andorra | Carles Gomez, Pol Moya, Kevin Poulet, Miquel Vilchez | DNS | |

=== High jump ===
3 June

| Rank | Name | Team | 1.90 | 1.95 | 2.00 | 2.03 | 2.06 | 2.09 | 2.12 | 2.15 | 2.18 | 2.21 | Result | Notes |
|---|---|---|---|---|---|---|---|---|---|---|---|---|---|---|
| 1st place, gold medalist(s) | Vasilios Konstantinou | Cyprus | – | – | – | – | – | o | – | o | x– | o | 2.21 | |
| 2nd place, silver medalist(s) | Eugenio Rossi | San Marino | – | – | o | – | o | o | o | xo | o | xxx | 2.18 | |
| 3rd place, bronze medalist(s) | Kevin Rutare | Luxembourg | – | – | o | – | o | o | o | xo | xxo | xxx | 2.18 | |
| 4 | Matteo Mosconi | San Marino | – | – | o | – | o | o | xo | xxx | | | 2.12 | |
| 5 | Sven Liefgen | Luxembourg | xxo | o | o | xo | xxx | | | | | | 2.03 | |

=== Pole vault ===
1 June

| Rank | Name | Team | 4.20 | 4.40 | 4.60 | 4.70 | 4.80 | 4.85 | 4.90 | 4.95 | 5.00 | 5.05 | 5.10 | 5.20 | 5.40 | 5.55 | 5.70 | Result | Notes |
|---|---|---|---|---|---|---|---|---|---|---|---|---|---|---|---|---|---|---|---|
| 1st place, gold medalist(s) | Nikandros Stylianou | Cyprus | – | – | – | – | – | – | – | – | o | – | – | o | xo | xxo | xxx | 5.55 | |
| 2nd place, silver medalist(s) | Joe Seil | Luxembourg | – | – | o | – | o | – | o | – | o | xo | xxr | | | | | 5.05 | |
| 3rd place, bronze medalist(s) | Sébastien Hoffelt | Luxembourg | – | – | – | o | – | o | – | o | o | xx– | x | | | | | 5.00 | |
| 4 | Miquel Vilchez | Andorra | – | o | o | o | xo | o | xo | xo | x– | xx | | | | | | 4.95 | NR |
| 5 | Cadogan Abada | Monaco | xo | o | o | xxx | | | | | | | | | | | | 4.60 | |
| | Jesse Aliaga-Jacob | Monaco | – | xxx | | | | | | | | | | | | | | NM | |

=== Long jump ===
30 May

| Rank | Name | Team | #1 | #2 | #3 | #4 | #5 | #6 | Result | Notes |
|---|---|---|---|---|---|---|---|---|---|---|
| 1st place, gold medalist(s) | Þorsteinn Ingvarsson | Iceland | 7.20 | 7.38 | 7.29 | 7.25 | 7.54 | x | 7.54 | |
| 2nd place, silver medalist(s) | Kristinn Torfason | Iceland | 6.78 | 7.15 | 7.34 | 7.41 | x | 7.42 | 7.42 | |
| 3rd place, bronze medalist(s) | Matthaios Volou | Cyprus | 7.19 | x | 7.15 | 7.00 | 7.08 | 7.09 | 7.19 | |
| 4 | Christos Pantelides | Cyprus | 7.05 | x | 6.98 | 7.10 | 4.49 | 7.09 | 7.10 | |
| 5 | Ian Paul Grech | Malta | 6.71 | x | 6.67 | 6.97 | x | x | 6.97 | |
| 6 | Taaniel Kraavi | Luxembourg | 6.18 | 6.42 | 6.37 | 6.57 | 6.59 | 6.29 | 6.59 | |
| 7 | Jesse Aliaga-Jacob | Monaco | 4.13 | 6.34 | x | 6.45 | x | – | 6.45 | |

=== Triple jump ===
3 June

| Rank | Name | Team | #1 | #2 | #3 | #4 | #5 | #6 | Result | Notes |
|---|---|---|---|---|---|---|---|---|---|---|
| 1st place, gold medalist(s) | Panagiotis Volou | Cyprus | 15.73 | 15.43 | 15.66 | 15.76 | 15.72 | x | 15.76 | |
| 2nd place, silver medalist(s) | Loginos Achileos | Cyprus | x | 14.73 | 14.43 | 14.87 | x | 14.99 | 14.99 | |
| 3rd place, bronze medalist(s) | Ian Paul Grech | Malta | 14.78 | 14.78 | – | x | x | x | 14.78 | |
| 4 | Þorsteinn Ingvarsson | Iceland | 14.10 | 14.38 | 14.35 | 14.43 | x | x | 14.43 | |
| 5 | Jesse Aliaga-Jacob | Monaco | 13.12 | x | x | x | x | – | 13.12 | |
| 6 | Cadogan Abada | Monaco | 12.81 | x | – | – | – | – | 12.81 | |

=== Shot put ===
30 May

| Rank | Name | Team | #1 | #2 | #3 | #4 | #5 | #6 | Result | Notes |
|---|---|---|---|---|---|---|---|---|---|---|
| 1st place, gold medalist(s) | Bob Bertemes | Luxembourg | 18.99 | 19.09 | 18.68 | 19.15 | 19.33 | 19.28 | 19.33 | |
| 2nd place, silver medalist(s) | Tomaš Đurović | Montenegro | 18.51 | x | x | x | 18.80 | x | 18.80 | |
| 3rd place, bronze medalist(s) | Óðinn Björn Þorsteinsson | Iceland | 17.16 | 17.39 | 17.59 | x | x | x | 17.59 | |
| 4 | Guðni Valur Guðnason | Iceland | 16.07 | 16.05 | 16.96 | 16.91 | x | x | 16.96 | |
| 5 | Vasilis Mouaimis | Cyprus | x | 15.67 | x | 15.52 | 15.23 | x | 15.67 | |

=== Discus throw ===
1 June

| Rank | Name | Team | #1 | #2 | #3 | #4 | #5 | #6 | Result | Notes |
|---|---|---|---|---|---|---|---|---|---|---|
| 1st place, gold medalist(s) | Guðni Valur Guðnason | Iceland | 58.72 | 59.98 | x | x | x | x | 59.98 | |
| 2nd place, silver medalist(s) | Andreas Christou | Cyprus | 57.06 | 59.74 | 58.68 | 56.97 | x | x | 59.74 | |
| 3rd place, bronze medalist(s) | Ivan Kukuličić | Montenegro | 49.41 | 52.45 | 55.10 | 53.84 | 56.40 | x | 56.40 | |
| 4 | Christoforos Genethli | Cyprus | 46.52 | x | 49.09 | 48.02 | 54.05 | x | 54.05 | |
| | Óðinn Björn Þorsteinsson | Iceland | | | | | | | DNS | |

=== Javelin throw ===
3 June

| Rank | Name | Team | #1 | #2 | #3 | #4 | #5 | #6 | Result | Notes |
|---|---|---|---|---|---|---|---|---|---|---|
| 1st place, gold medalist(s) | Örn Davíðsson | Iceland | 69.88 | 66.72 | 71.71 | 74.81 | 71.48 | 69.47 | 74.81 | |
| 2nd place, silver medalist(s) | Tom Reuter | Luxembourg | 63.35 | 69.00 | 70.56 | 71.89 | 71.16 | 68.33 | 71.89 | |
| 3rd place, bronze medalist(s) | Guðmundur Sverrisson | Iceland | 61.37 | 70.44 | 71.27 | 65.85 | 67.50 | 70.53 | 71.27 | |
| 4 | Michalis Kakotas | Cyprus | 67.59 | 67.84 | 69.36 | 68.99 | 68.24 | 66.69 | 69.36 | |

== Women's results ==
=== 100 metres ===
30 May
Wind: -0.2 m/s

| Rank | Lane | Name | Team | Time | Notes |
|---|---|---|---|---|---|
| 1st place, gold medalist(s) | 3 | Charlotte Wingfield | Malta | 11.62 | |
| 2nd place, silver medalist(s) | 6 | Patrizia van der Weken | Luxembourg | 11.86 | |
| 3rd place, bronze medalist(s) | 1 | Dimitra Kyriakidou | Cyprus | 12.04 | |
| 4 | 5 | Hrafnhild Eir Hermóðsdóttir | Iceland | 12.09 | |
| 5 | 2 | Tiana Ósk Whitworth | Iceland | 12.14 | |
| 6 | 4 | Anaïs Bauer | Luxembourg | 12.16 | |
| 7 | 8 | Sanda Colomeiteva | Cyprus | 12.58 | |
| 8 | 7 | Rebecca Guidi | San Marino | 12.93 | |

=== 200 metres ===
3 June
Wind: +0.3 m/s

| Rank | Lane | Name | Team | Time | Notes |
|---|---|---|---|---|---|
| 1st place, gold medalist(s) | 4 | Charlotte Wingfield | Malta | 23.78 | |
| 2nd place, silver medalist(s) | 6 | Guðbjörg Bjarnadóttir | Iceland | 24.13 | |
| 3rd place, bronze medalist(s) | 5 | Patrizia van der Weken | Luxembourg | 24.32 | |
| 4 | 7 | Tiana Ósk Whitworth | Iceland | 24.53 | |
| 5 | 3 | Anaïs Bauer | Luxembourg | 24.55 | |
| 6 | 8 | Dimitra Kyriakidou | Cyprus | 24.72 | |
| 7 | 2 | Sanda Colomeiteva | Cyprus | 24.98 | |

=== 400 metres ===
1 June

| Rank | Lane | Name | Team | Time | Notes |
|---|---|---|---|---|---|
| 1st place, gold medalist(s) | 7 | Christiana Katsari | Cyprus | 55.01 | |
| 2nd place, silver medalist(s) | 4 | Guðbjörg Bjarnadóttir | Iceland | 55.72 | |
| 3rd place, bronze medalist(s) | 6 | Kalliopi Kountouri | Cyprus | 57.06 | |
| 4 | 3 | Janet Richard | Malta | 57.36 | |
| 5 | 5 | Anouk Zens | Luxembourg | 58.29 | |

=== 800 metres ===
30 May

| Rank | Name | Team | Time | Notes |
|---|---|---|---|---|
| 1st place, gold medalist(s) | Natalia Evangelidou | Cyprus | 2:06.62 | |
| 2nd place, silver medalist(s) | Vera Hoffmann | Luxembourg | 2:09.00 | |
| 3rd place, bronze medalist(s) | Dayane Huerta | Andorra | 2:10.56 | |
| 4 | Jenny Gloden | Luxembourg | 2:11.54 | |
| 5 | Francesca Borg | Malta | 2:15.70 | |

=== 1500 metres ===
1 June

| Rank | Name | Team | Time | Notes |
|---|---|---|---|---|
| 1st place, gold medalist(s) | Charline Mathias | Luxembourg | 4:21.59 | |
| 2nd place, silver medalist(s) | Natalia Evangelidou | Cyprus | 4:22.15 | |
| 3rd place, bronze medalist(s) | Dayane Huerta | Andorra | 4:30.11 | |
| 4 | Lena Kieffer | Luxembourg | 4:36.74 | |
| 5 | Mona Lisa Camilleri | Malta | 4:43.23 | |
| 6 | Clara Angio | Monaco | 4:57.04 | |

=== 5000 metres ===
3 June

| Rank | Name | Team | Time | Notes |
|---|---|---|---|---|
| 1st place, gold medalist(s) | Slađana Perunović | Montenegro | 17:04.19 | |
| 2nd place, silver medalist(s) | Meropi Panagiotou | Cyprus | 17:15.73 | |
| 3rd place, bronze medalist(s) | Dagmara Handzlik | Cyprus | 17:21.86 | PB |
| 4 | Lisa Marie Bezzina | Malta | 17:41.29 | |
| 5 | Roberta Schembri | Malta | 17:49.47 | |
| 6 | Adriana-Maria Di Guisto | Monaco | 18:54.46 | |
| | Martine Mellina | Luxembourg | DNF | |
| | Dayane Huerta | Andorra | DNF | |

=== 10,000 metres ===
1 June

| Rank | Name | Team | Time | Notes |
|---|---|---|---|---|
| 1st place, gold medalist(s) | Arndís Ýr Hafþórsdóttir | Iceland | 36:59.69 | |
| 2nd place, silver medalist(s) | Dagmara Handzlik | Cyprus | 37:10.12 | |
| 3rd place, bronze medalist(s) | Slađana Perunović | Montenegro | 38:00.10 | |
| 4 | Lisa Marie Bezzina | Malta | 39:12.17 | |
| 5 | Adriana-Maria Di Guisto | Monaco | 39:57.05 | |

=== 100 metres hurdles ===
3 June
Wind: -0.7 m/s

| Rank | Lane | Name | Team | Time | Notes |
|---|---|---|---|---|---|
| 1st place, gold medalist(s) | 8 | Natalia Christofi | Cyprus | 13.64 | |
| 2nd place, silver medalist(s) | 4 | Lara Marx | Luxembourg | 14.20 | |
| 3rd place, bronze medalist(s) | 6 | Victoria Rausch | Luxembourg | 14.30 | |
| 4 | 6 | María Rún Gunnlaugsdóttir | Iceland | 14.69 | |
| 5 | 7 | Barbara Rustignoli | San Marino | 14.93 | |
| 6 | 3 | Malory Malgherini | Monaco | 23.40 | |
| | 2 | Dimitra Arachoviti | Cyprus | DNF | |

=== 400 metres hurdles ===
1 June

| Rank | Lane | Name | Team | Time | Notes |
|---|---|---|---|---|---|
| 1st place, gold medalist(s) | 3 | Arna Guðmundsdóttir | Iceland | 59.14 | |
| 2nd place, silver medalist(s) | 4 | Kim Reuland | Luxembourg | 1:01.83 | |
| 3rd place, bronze medalist(s) | 6 | Lise Boryna | Monaco | 1:03.51 | |
| 4 | 5 | Beatrice Berti | San Marino | 1:05.88 | |

=== 4 × 100 meters relay ===
3 June

| Rank | Lane | Nation | Competitors | Time | Notes |
|---|---|---|---|---|---|
| 1st place, gold medalist(s) | 3 | Iceland | Tiana Ósk Whitworth, Hrafnhild Eir Hermódsdóttir, Guðbjörg Bjarnadóttir, Arna Guðmundsdóttir | 45.31 | GR, NR |
| 2nd place, silver medalist(s) | 4 | Malta | Sarah Busuttil, Annalise Vassallo, Rachel Fitz, Charlotte Wingfield | 46.31 | |
| 3rd place, bronze medalist(s) | 6 | Luxembourg | Lara Marx, Patrizia van der Weken, Victoria Rausch, Anaïs Bauer | 46.68 | |
| 4 | 7 | Cyprus | Sanda Colomeiteva, Natalia Christofi, Dimitra Arachoviti, Dimitra Kyriakidou | 47.14 | |
| 5 | 5 | San Marino | Alice Capicchioni, Beatrice Berti, Barbara Rustignoli, Rebecca Guidi | 51.19 | |

=== 4 × 400 meters relay ===
3 June

| Rank | Nation | Competitors | Time | Notes |
|---|---|---|---|---|
| 1st place, gold medalist(s) | Iceland | María Rún Gunnlaugsdóttir, Hrafnhild Eir Hermódsdóttir, Guðbjörg Bjarnadóttir, Arna Guðmundsdóttir | 3:47.64 | |
| 2nd place, silver medalist(s) | Cyprus | Sanda Colomeiteva, Natalia Evangelidou, Kalliopi Kountouri, Christiana Katsari | 3:48.63 | |
| 3 | Luxembourg | Anouk Zens, Jenny Gloden, Vera Hoffmann, Kim Reuland | 3:49.77 | |

=== High jump ===
30 May

| Rank | Name | Team | 1.45 | 1.50 | 1.55 | 1.60 | 1.65 | 1.68 | 1.71 | 1.74 | 1.77 | 1.83 | 1.89 | 1.91 | 1.94 | Result | Notes |
|---|---|---|---|---|---|---|---|---|---|---|---|---|---|---|---|---|---|
| 1st place, gold medalist(s) | Marija Vuković | Montenegro | – | – | – | – | – | – | o | – | o | o | o | o | xxx | 1.91 | |
| 2nd place, silver medalist(s) | María Rún Gunnlaugsdóttir | Iceland | – | – | – | o | o | xo | xxo | xxx | | | | | | 1.71 | |
| 3rd place, bronze medalist(s) | Claudia Guri | Andorra | – | – | – | o | o | o | xxx | | | | | | | 1.68 | |
| 3rd place, bronze medalist(s) | Melissa Michelotti | San Marino | – | o | o | o | o | o | xxx | | | | | | | 1.68 | |
| 5 | Malory Malgherini | Monaco | o | o | o | xxx | | | | | | | | | | 1.55 | |

=== Pole vault ===
30 May

| Rank | Name | Team | 3.10 | 3.30 | 3.50 | 3.60 | 3.70 | 3.75 | 3.80 | 3.85 | 3.90 | 4.00 | 4.10 | 4.20 | 4.25 | 4.35 | Result | Notes |
|---|---|---|---|---|---|---|---|---|---|---|---|---|---|---|---|---|---|---|
| 1st place, gold medalist(s) | Hulda Þorsteinsdóttir | Iceland | – | – | – | – | o | – | – | o | – | xo | o | o | – | xxx | 4.20 | |
| 2nd place, silver medalist(s) | Maria Aristotelous | Cyprus | – | – | – | o | – | o | – | o | – | xo | o | x– | xx | | 4.10 | |
| 3rd place, bronze medalist(s) | Edna Semedo Monteiro | Luxembourg | – | – | o | o | xo | – | o | – | xxx | | | | | | 3.80 | |
| 4 | Peppijna Dalli | Malta | – | xxo | xxo | – | xxx | | | | | | | | | | 3.50 | |
| 5 | Martina Muraccini | San Marino | o | o | xxx | | | | | | | | | | | | 3.30 | |

=== Long jump ===
1 June

| Rank | Name | Team | #1 | #2 | #3 | #4 | #5 | #6 | Result | Notes |
|---|---|---|---|---|---|---|---|---|---|---|
| 1st place, gold medalist(s) | Ljiljana Matović | Montenegro | 5.57 | x | x | 5.51 | 5.64 | x | 5.64 | |
| 2nd place, silver medalist(s) | María Rún Gunnlaugsdóttir | Iceland | 5.45 | x | x | 3.98 | x | 5.53 | 5.53 | |
| 3rd place, bronze medalist(s) | Rebecca Saré | Malta | 5.07 | x | x | x | 5.33 | 5.33 | 5.33 | |
| 4 | Soraya De Sousa Moreira | Luxembourg | 4.81 | 5.08 | 5.20 | 5.17 | x | 5.26 | 5.26 | |

=== Triple jump ===
3 June

| Rank | Name | Team | #1 | #2 | #3 | #4 | #5 | #6 | Result | Notes |
|---|---|---|---|---|---|---|---|---|---|---|
| 1st place, gold medalist(s) | Ekeftheria Christofi | Cyprus | 12.15 | 11.93 | x | 11.97 | 12.16 | x | 12.16 | |
| 2nd place, silver medalist(s) | Ljiljana Matović | Montenegro | x | 11.64 | 11.44 | x | 11.49 | 11.35 | 11.64 | |
| 3rd place, bronze medalist(s) | Rebecca Saré | Malta | 11.52 | x | 11.62 | 11.44 | x | x | 11.62 | |
| 4 | Malory Malgherini | Monaco | 10.49 | 9.27 | – | 10.59 | 11.07 | x | 11.07 | |
| | Lise Boryna | Monaco | | | | | | | DNS | |

=== Shot put ===
1 June

| Rank | Name | Team | #1 | #2 | #3 | #4 | #5 | #6 | Result | Notes |
|---|---|---|---|---|---|---|---|---|---|---|
| 1st place, gold medalist(s) | Gavriella Fella | Cyprus | 14.82 | 14.14 | 15.81 | 14.92 | x | 15.75 | 15.81 | |
| 2nd place, silver medalist(s) | Ásdís Hjálmsdóttir | Iceland | x | 15.12 | 14.85 | x | 14.93 | 15.39 | 15.39 | |
| 3rd place, bronze medalist(s) | Kristina Rakočević | Montenegro | 13.37 | x | 13.45 | 14.56 | 14.36 | x | 14.56 | |
| 4 | Stephanie Krumlovsky | Luxembourg | 13.96 | 13.51 | 14.03 | x | x | x | 14.03 | |
| 5 | Thelma Kristjánsdóttir | Iceland | 12.00 | 12.70 | 13.05 | x | 12.46 | 12.82 | 13.05 | |

=== Discus throw ===
3 June

| Rank | Name | Team | #1 | #2 | #3 | #4 | #5 | #6 | Result | Notes |
|---|---|---|---|---|---|---|---|---|---|---|
| 1st place, gold medalist(s) | Kristina Rakočević | Montenegro | 53.79 | 51.36 | x | 51.05 | x | x | 53.79 | |
| 2nd place, silver medalist(s) | Androniki Lada | Cyprus | 50.01 | x | x | x | x | x | 50.01 | |
| 3rd place, bronze medalist(s) | Thelma Kristjánsdóttir | Iceland | 45.05 | 48.18 | 47.94 | 45.17 | 44.04 | 49.38 | 49.38 | |
| 4 | Laura Rheinberger | Liechtenstein | 36.39 | 34.55 | 33.67 | 36.79 | 35.74 | x | 36.79 | |
| 5 | Antonella Chouhal | Malta | 33.34 | 31.06 | x | 33.62 | 33.25 | 34.01 | 34.01 | |

=== Javelin throw ===
30 May

| Rank | Name | Team | #1 | #2 | #3 | #4 | #5 | #6 | Result | Notes |
|---|---|---|---|---|---|---|---|---|---|---|
| 1st place, gold medalist(s) | Ásdís Hjálmsdóttir | Iceland | x | 60.03 | 57.84 | 59.01 | 55.93 | 58.57 | 60.03 | |
| 2nd place, silver medalist(s) | Marielle Rousi | Cyprus | 42.15 | 39.76 | 49.16 | x | 42.29 | 44.05 | 49.16 | |
| 3rd place, bronze medalist(s) | Noémie Pleimling | Luxembourg | 45.37 | x | 43.83 | 43.88 | 47.29 | x | 47.29 | |
| 4 | María Rún Gunnlaugsdóttir | Iceland | 44.53 | x | x | 44.38 | 45.77 | 46.50 | 46.50 | |
| 5 | Inga Stasiulionytė | Monaco | 42.26 | 43.40 | 46.39 | x | x | 43.92 | 46.39 | |
| 6 | Joanne Vella | Malta | 38.14 | x | x | 37.95 | 40.39 | x | 40.39 | |
| | Malory Malgherini | Monaco | x | x | – | – | – | – | NM | |
