= Stefan Bečanović =

Montenegrin sprinter

Personal information
- Nationality: Montenegrin
- Born: November 28, 1990 (age 35) Nikšić, SFR Yugoslavia

Sport
- Sport: Track
- Event: 400 metres

Achievements and titles
- Personal best: 400 metres: 49.83

Stefan Bečanović (born November 28, 1990) is a Montenegrin sprinter. He represented Montenegro at the 2009 Summer Universiade in the 400 and 800 metre-races. He is the son of former judoka Dragomir Bečanović.

== Running career ==
He began training full-time with AK Nikšić from 2008, until he transferred to AK Lim (named after river Lim) of Berane in 2013. With AK Nikšić he specialized in the 400 metres and 800 metres, and subsequently switched to shorter-distances such as 100 metres and 200 metres with AK Lim. At the 2009 Summer Universiade in Belgrade, he ran the men's 400 meters in 51.17 and the men's 800 in 1:58.91.

Bečanović became the holder of the Montenegrin national post-referendum record for the 400 metre discipline when he ran a time of 49.83 seconds on June 8, 2013, beating the previous record of 49.85 seconds of Šćepan Ćetković from AK Nikšić by just 0.02 seconds.

At the 2013 European Team Championships, Bečanović along with Šćepan Ćetković, Dragan Pešić, and Milan Nikolić ran for Montenegro's 4 × 400 metres relay team which ran a time of 3:25.10 minutes.
