= 2018 Championships of the Small States of Europe =

2018 Championships of the Small States of Europes
- Dates: 9 June 2018
- Host city: Schaan, Liechtenstein
- Venue: Sportplatz Rheinwiese
- Level: Senior
- Events: 22
- Participation: 17 nations

The 2018 Championships of the Small States of Europe was the second edition of the biennial competition in outdoor track and field organised by the Athletic Association of Small States of Europe (AASE). It was held on 9 June 2018 at the Sportplatz Rheinwiese in Schaan, Liechtenstein. A total of 22 events were contested by around 250 athletes from 18 nations.

== Medal summary ==
=== Men ===
Event	Gold		Silver		Bronze	
100 metres	Paisios Dimitriades (CYP)	10.65	Francesco Molinari (SMR)	10.73	Bachana Khorava (GEO)	10.74
200 metres (wind: +2.5 m/s)	Kolbeinn Höður Gunnarsson (ISL)	20.89 w	Paisios Dimitriades (CYP)	21.02 w	Alexandru Zati (MDA)	21.39 w
400 metres	Ívar Kristinn Jasonarson (ISL)	47.76	Vincent Karger (LUX)	48.01	Edmond Murataj (ALB)	48.22
800 metres	Musa Hajdari (KOS)	1:49.26	Ivan Siuris (MDA)	1:50.39	Astrit Kryeziu (KOS)	1:51.27
3000 metres	Yervand Mkrtchyan (ARM)	8:24.87	Maxim Răileanu (MDA)	8:28.04	Nikolas Frangou (CYP)	8:34.25
110 m hurdles	Rəhim Məmmədov (AZE)	14.06	Alexandr Cruşelniţchii (MDA)	14.48	François Grailet (LUX)	14.72
1000 m medley relay	Iceland (ISL); Kristinn Torafsson; Ari Bragi Kárason; Kolbeinn Höður Gunnarsson; Ívar Kristinn Jasonarson	1:52.71	Moldova (MDA); Alexei Morozov; Andrei Daranuta; Alexandru Zatic; Andrei Sturmilov	1:53.63	Armenia (ARM)	1:56.10
High jump	Charel Gaspar (LUX)	2.10	Matteo Mosconi (SMR)	2.07	Sven Liefgen (LUX)	2.07
Long jump	Izmir Smajlaj (ALB)	7.90	Lasha Gulelauri (GEO)	7.67 w (+2.1 m/s)	Artak Hambardzumyan (ARM)	7.57
Shot put	Giorgi Mujaridze (GEO)	19.52	Ivan Emilianov (MDA)	18.20	Rafail Antoniou (CYP)	13.89
Discus throw	Guðni Valur Guðnason (ISL)	60.25	Rafail Antoniou (CYP)	58.99	Stefan Mura (MDA)	56.99

=== Women ===
Event	Gold		Silver		Bronze	
100 metres (wind: 0.0 m/s)	Olivia Fotopoulou (CYP)	11.49	Zakiyya Hasanova (AZE)	11.61	Patrizia van der Weken (LUX)	11.67
200 metres (wind: +2.4 m/s in heat 1, +0.9 m/s in heat 2)	Zakiyya Hasanova (AZE)	23.56 w	Gudbjörg Jóna Bjarnadóttir (ISL)	23.61	Charlotte Wingfield (MLT)	24.08 w
400 metres	Kalliopi Kountouri (CYP)	54.64	Gayane Chiloyan (ARM)	55.40	Janet Richard (MLT)	56.38
800 metres	Natalia Evangelidou (CYP)	2:07.63	Olesea Smovjenco (MDA)	2:13.42	Gresa Bakrraqi (KOS)	2:13.88
3000 metres	Valeriya Zhandarova (GEO)	9:13.20	Lilia Fisikovici (MDA)	9:14.30	Meropi Panagiotou (CYP)	9:37.02
100 m hurdles (wind: 1.2 m/s)	Dafni Georgiou (CYP)	13.77	Dimitra Arachoviti (CYP)	13.82	Victoria Rausch (LUX)	13.90
1000 m medley relay	Cyprus (CYP); Olivia Fotopoulou; Sanda Colomeiteva; Kalliopi Kountouri; Christiana Katsari	2:11.36	Iceland (ISL); Tiana Ósk Whitworth; Þórdís Eva Steinsdóttir; Hrafnhild Eir Hermóðsdóttir; Guðbjörg Jóna Bjarnadóttir	2:11.36	Malta (MLT); Rachel Fitz; Sarah Busuttil; Ylenia Pace; Janet Richard	2:14.73
High jump	Marija Vuković (MNE)	1.86	Despina Charalambous (CYP)	1.73	Thóranna Ósk Sigurjónsdóttir (ISL)	1.73
Long jump	Filippa Fotopoulou (CYP)	6.20	Ljiljana Matović (MNE)	5.85	Uliana Buşilă (MDA)	5.81
Shot put	Dimitriana Surdu (MDA)	15.78	Sopo Shatirishvili (GEO)	14.56	Salome Rigishvili (GEO)	14.27
Discus throw	Dimitriana Surdu (MDA)	53.13	Thelma Lind Kristjánsdóttir (ISL)	52.80	Androniki Lada (CYP)	51.29

== Medal table ==
Rank	Nation	Gold	Silver	Bronze	Total
1	Cyprus (CYP)	7	4	4	15
2	Iceland (ISL)	4	3	1	8
3	Moldova (MDA)	2	7	3	12
4	Georgia (GEO)	2	2	2	6
5	Azerbaijan (AZE)	2	1	0	3
6	Luxembourg (LUX)	1	1	4	6
7	Armenia (ARM)	1	1	2	4
8	Montenegro (MNE)	1	1	0	2
9	Kosovo (KOS)	1	0	2	3
10	Albania (ALB)	1	0	1	2
11	San Marino (SMR)	0	2	0	2
12	Malta (MLT)	0	0	3	3
Totals (12 entries)		22	22	22	66
