= Natalia Evangelidou =

Cypriot middle-distance runner

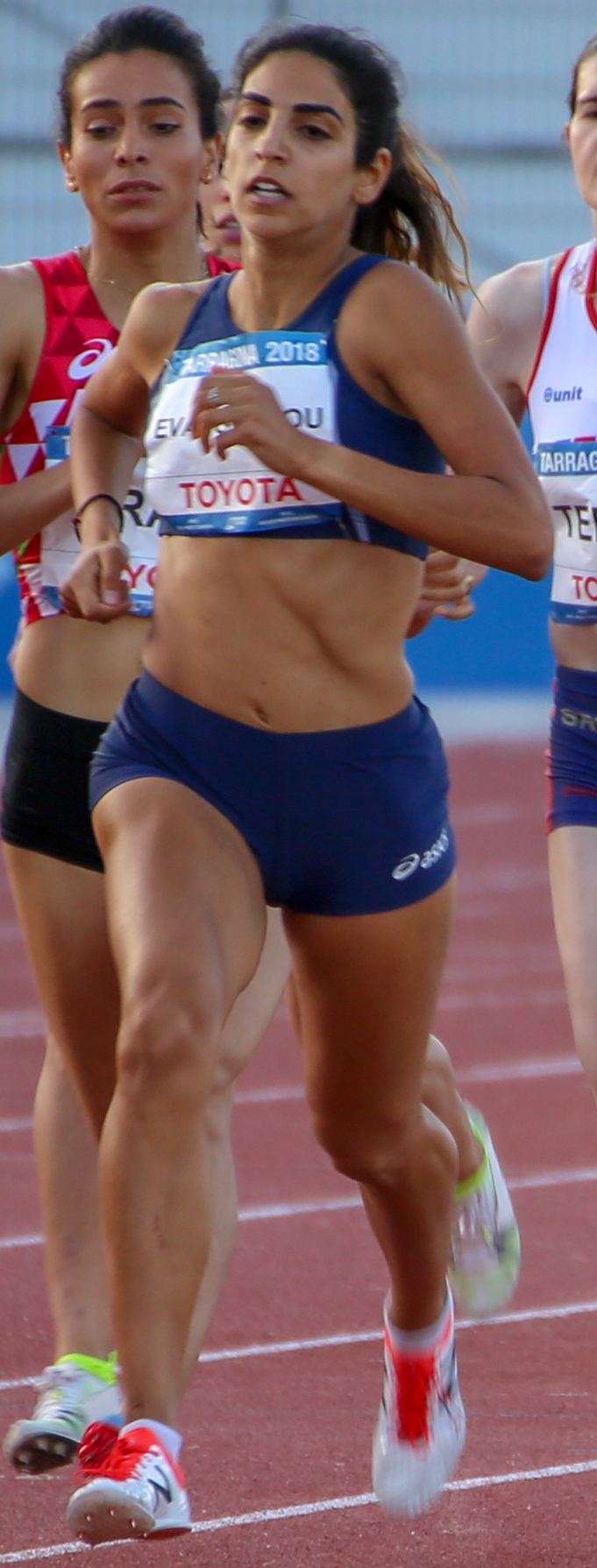

Personal information
- Born: 10 March 1991 (age 34) Nicosia, Cyprus
- Height: 1.67 m (5 ft 6 in)
- Weight: 54 kg (119 lb)

Sport
- Sport: Athletics
- Event(s): 800 m, 1500 m

Natalia Evangelidou (Greek: Ναταλία Ευαγγελίδου; born 10 March 1991) is a Cypriot middle-distance runner competing primarily in the 800 metres. She represented her country at the 2014 Commonwealth Games without qualifying from the heats. In addition, she won several medals at the Games of the Small States of Europe.

== Competition record ==
Year	Competition	Venue	Position	Event	Notes
Representing Cyprus
2013	Games of the Small States of Europe	Luxembourg, Luxembourg	4th	800 m	2:06.62
2013	Games of the Small States of Europe	Luxembourg, Luxembourg	2nd	1500 m	4:27.27
2013	Games of the Small States of Europe	Luxembourg, Luxembourg	–	4 × 400 m relay	DQ
2013	European U23 Championships	Tampere, Finland	8th (h)	800 m	2:04.03
2013	Jeux de la Francophonie	Nice, France	14th (h)	800 m	2:11.89
2014	Commonwealth Games	Glasgow, United Kingdom	20th (h)	800 m	2:05.95
2014	Commonwealth Games	Glasgow, United Kingdom	15th (h)	1500 m	4:16.05
2015	Games of the Small States of Europe	Reykjavík, Iceland	3rd	800 m	2:09.56
2015	Games of the Small States of Europe	Reykjavík, Iceland	2nd	1500 m	4:29.08
2015	Universiade	Gwangju, South Korea	10th (sf)	800 m	2:03.62
2016	Championships of the Small States of Europe	Marsa, Malta	3rd	800 m	2:07.28
2016	European Championships	Amsterdam, Netherlands	24th (sf)	800 m	2:03.99
2017	European Indoor Championships	Belgrade, Serbia	19th (h)	1500 m	4:24.61
2017	Games of the Small States of Europe	Serravalle, San Marino	1st	800 m	2:06.62
2017	Games of the Small States of Europe	Serravalle, San Marino	2nd	1500 m	4:22.15
2017	Games of the Small States of Europe	Serravalle, San Marino	2nd	4 × 400 m relay	3:48.63
2017	Universiade	Taipei, Taiwan	10th (sf)	800 m	2:03.92
2017	Universiade	Taipei, Taiwan	6th	1500 m	4:21.16
2018	Commonwealth Games	Gold Coast, Australia	16th (h)	800 m	2:01.77
2018	Commonwealth Games	Gold Coast, Australia	15th (h)	1500 m	4:10.98
2018	Championships of the Small States of Europe	Schaan, Liechtenstein	1st	800 m	2:07.63
2018	Mediterranean Games	Tarragona, Spain	7th	800 m	2:06.28
2018	Mediterranean Games	Tarragona, Spain	9th	1500 m	4:21.23
2018	European Championships	Berlin, Germany	21st (h)	800 m	2:03.38
2018	European Championships	Berlin, Germany	24th (h)	1500 m	4:25.91
2022	Championships of the Small States of Europe	Marsa, Malta	2nd	800 m	2:13.73

== Personal bests ==
Outdoor

- 800 metres – 2:01.77 (Gold Coast 2018) NR
- 1500 metres – 4:10.98 (Gold Coast 2018) NR

Indoor

- 800 metres – 2:06.52 (Beograd 2017) NR
- 1500 metres – 4:14.62 (Athlone 2018) NR
- 3000 metres – 10:06.41 (Piraeus 2018)
