= Dagmara Handzlik =

Cypriot athlete

Personal information
- Nationality: Cypriot
- Born: 20 February 1986 (age 40) Bielsko-Biała, Poland

Sport
- Sport: Long-distance running
- Event: Marathon
- College team: University of Toledo, University of Minnesota
Medal record
Women's athletics
Representing Cyprus
Games of the Small States of Europe
Silver medal – second place	2017 Serravalle	10000 m
Silver medal – second place	2019 Bar	10000 m
Bronze medal – third place	2017 Serravalle	5000 m

Dagmara-Anna Handzlik (Greek: Νταγκμάρα Χαντζλίκ; born 20 February 1986) is a Polish born Cypriot long distance runner. She competed in the women's marathon at the 2017 World Championships in Athletics. In 2019, she competed in the women's marathon at the 2019 World Athletics Championships held in Doha, Qatar. She did not finish her race.

== College years ==
She started her studies at the University of Toledo in 2005. In 2005 she finished second place in the Mid-American Conference cross country championships behind her compatriot Beata Rudzińska from University of Akron. In summer of 2007 Handzlik transferred to University of Minnesota.

== Personal best ==
Event	Result	Venue	Date
Outdoor
800 m	2:14.38	(Poland) Białystok	27 June 2004
1500 m	4:33.94	(Poland) Białystok	26 June 2004
5000 m	17:21.86	(San Marino) Serravalle	3 June 2017
10000 m	35:49.54	(Montenegro) Bar	31 May 2019
Marathon	2:38:52	(United Kingdom) London	6 August 2017
Indoor
1500 m	4:56.73	(Poland) Spała	28 January 2005
3000 m	9:50.41	(United States) Boston	28 January 2006
5000 m	17:02.85	(United States) Bowling Green	24 February 2006
