= Luke Bezzina =

Maltese sprinter (born 1995)

Personal information
- Nationality: Malta
- Born: 7 May 1995 (age 31)

Sport
- Country: Malta
- Sport: Athletics
- Event: 100 m

Achievements and titles
- Personal bests: 100 m: 10.68 (2016); 200 m: 22.25 (2016)

Luke Bezzina (born 7 May 1995) is a Maltese sprinter. He competed in the men's 100 metres at the 2016 Summer Olympics.

== International competitions ==
Year	Competition	Venue	Position	Event	Notes
2013	Games of the Small States of Europe	Luxembourg, Luxembourg	5th	100 m	10.98
2013	Games of the Small States of Europe	Luxembourg, Luxembourg	–	200 m	DQ
2013	Games of the Small States of Europe	Luxembourg, Luxembourg	3rd	4 × 100 m relay	41.91
2013	European Junior Championships	Rieti, Italy	35th (h)	100 m	11.18
2015	Universiade	Gwangju, South Korea	47th (h)	100 m	11.07
2015	Universiade	Gwangju, South Korea	52nd (h)	200 m	22.59
2016	Olympic Games	Rio de Janeiro, Brazil	73rd (p)	100 m	11.04
2017	European Indoor Championships	Belgrade, Serbia	23rd (h)	60 m	7.02
2017	Games of the Small States of Europe	Serravalle, San Marino	4th	100 m	10.90
2017	Games of the Small States of Europe	Serravalle, San Marino	6th	200 m	22.34
2017	European U23 Championships	Bydgoszcz, Poland	37th (h)	100 m	10.88
2017	European U23 Championships	Bydgoszcz, Poland	25th (h)	200 m	22.19
2018	Championships of the Small States of Europe	Schaan, Liechtenstein	12th	100 m	11.17
2018	Championships of the Small States of Europe	Schaan, Liechtenstein	8th	200 m	22.46
2021	Championships of the Small States of Europe	Serravalle, San Marino	6th	100 m	11.15
2023	Games of the Small States of Europe	Marsa, Malta	–	100 m	DQ
2023	Games of the Small States of Europe	Marsa, Malta	st	4 × 100 m relay	40.59
2025	Games of the Small States of Europe	Andorra la Vella, Andorra	2nd	4 × 100 m relay	41.13

== Personal Bests ==
Outdoor

Event	Time	Venue	Date
100 m	10.68	Marsa	June 25, 2016
200 m	22.25	Marsa	June 26, 2016
