= Trausti Stefánsson =

Icelandic sprinter (born 1985)

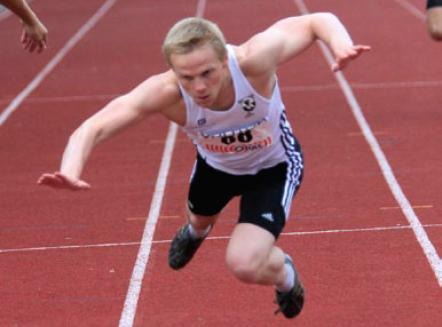
- Trausti Stefánsson

Personal information
- Nationality: Icelandic
- Born: 20 January 1985 (age 41) Breiðholt, Iceland

Sport
- Sport: Track and field
- Event(s): 200 m, 400 m, 4×100 m
- Club: Fimleikafélag Hafnarfjarðar

Achievements and titles
- Personal best(s): 60 m (indoors): 6.95 s (2009) 100 m: 10.85 s (2016); 200 m: 21.83 s (2016); 200 m (indoors): 21.77 s (2012); 300 m: 34.54 s (2016); 300 m (indoors): 34.05 s (NR)(2017); 400 m: 47.73 s (2012) 400 m (indoors): 47.62 s (2015)

Trausti Stefánsson (born 20 January 1985) is an Icelandic sprinter and former basketball player. He set the Icelandic record in the 400-meter sprint (indoors) in 2012.

== Basketball ==
Trausti played with Úrvalsdeild karla club Íþróttafélag Reykjavíkur until 2007. He was a member of ÍR's team that won the Icelandic Cup in February 2007. He retired from basketball following the season due to his height and an incident involving two players when the team played in Egilsstaðir, that scarred him for life.

== Track and field ==
During the 2006 basketball off-season, Trausti starting doing track and field at the age of 21. A year later he quit basketball to fully focus on his sprinting career.

=== 2012 IAAF World Indoor Championships ===
Trausti was selected to represent Iceland at the 2012 IAAF World Indoor Championships. He participated in the 400 metres. He ended in 21st place out of 31.
