= AK Nikšić =

Athletics club from Nikšić, Montenegro

- Founded: 31 July 1997
- Based in: Nikšić
- Colors
- Head coach: Drago Musić
- Website: www.akniksic.com

AK Nikšić is an athletics club from Nikšić, Montenegro. It was founded on 31 July 1997 by former marathoner Drago Musić. It competes in domestic competitions sanctioned by the Athletic Federation of Montenegro. It is also one of the most prolific organizers of cross country and road races in Montenegro.

== History ==
Before its creation in 1997, only a few athletics teams in Nikšić existed. Historically, Sutjeska and Čelik were better known for their football teams rather than athletics, but both clubs composed the athletics scene in Nikšić until the breakup of Yugoslavia. By the time Yugoslav distance-runner Drago Musić began coaching in the late 1990s, athletics had deteriorated a lot due to the sanctions and isolation Yugoslavia had experienced that decade. He decided to form a new club in his hometown and named it "Atletski Klub Nikšić". Since its creation, the team has helped foster the growth of numerous track, field, and road-running athletes. AK Nikšić was the first-placed team in Montenegro's club cross country championship from 2008 to 2011. Slađana Perunović became the club's first Olympian when she competed in the women's marathon at the 2012 Summer Olympics in London. She first joined AK Nikšić with coaching by Drago Musić in 2003. On January 2, 2015, AK Nikšić became the first athletics team in Montenegro to have two Olympic qualifiers on its squad when Danijel Furtula joined from AK Tara from Mojkovac.
