= Sarah Busuttil =

Maltese sprinter

Personal information
- Nationality: Maltese
- Born: 14 October 1991 (age 34) Kirkop, Malta
- Education: University of Malta

Sport
- Country: Malta
- Sport: Athletics
- Event(s): 60 metres, 100 metres, 200 metres, 300 metres, 400 metres
- Club: Pembroke Athleta

Sarah Busuttil (born 14 October 1991) is a sprinter competing internationally for Malta. Busuttil started her career as a footballer but later transitioned to athletics in late 2014. She competed in the 4 × 100 m relay at the European Team Championships – 3rd League. At this event, Busuttil together with Janet Richard, Rachel Fitz and Charlotte Wingfield set the Maltese record on 21 June 2015.

== Personal bests ==
Outdoor

- 60 metres – 7.84 (Marsa, 4 February 2018)
- 100 metres – 11.91 (Marsa, 10 July 2021)
- 200 metres – 24.58 (Marsa, 11 July 2021)
- 300 metres – 40.99 (Marsa, 5 May 2018)
- 400 metres – 59.81 (Marsa, 6 April 2019)
