= Jacques Frisch =

Personal information
- Born: 18 December 1987 (age 38)
- Education: Pantheon-Sorbonne University
- Height: 1.86 m (6 ft 1 in)
- Weight: 69 kg (152 lb)

Sport
- Sport: Athletics
- Event: 400 metres hurdles
- Club: Avia Club Issy-les-Moulineaux

Jacques Frisch (born 18 December 1987) is a Luxembourgish athlete specialising in the 400 metres hurdles. He represented his country at the 2013 World Championships without finishing his heat.

His personal best in the event is 50.94 seconds set in Chambéry in 2013. This is the current national record.

== International competitions ==
Year	Competition	Venue	Position	Event	Notes
Representing Luxembourg
2009	Games of the Small States of Europe	Nicosia, Cyprus	2nd	400 m hurdles	53.44
2009	Games of the Small States of Europe	Nicosia, Cyprus	2nd	4 × 400 m relay	3:16.90
2009	European U23 Championships	Kaunas, Lithuania	28th (h)	400 m hurdles	52.68
2012	European Championships	Helsinki, Finland	26th (h)	400 m hurdles	51.59
2013	Games of the Small States of Europe	Luxembourg, Luxembourg	1st	400 m hurdles	52.28
2013	Games of the Small States of Europe	Luxembourg, Luxembourg	2nd	4 × 400 m relay	3:14.45
2013	Universiade	Kazan, Russia	12th (sf)	400 m hurdles	51.50
2013	World Championships	Moscow, Russia	–	400 m hurdles	DNF
2013	Jeux de la Francophonie	Nice, France	5th	400 m hurdles	51.87
2014	European Championships	Zürich, Switzerland	35th (h)	400 m hurdles	54.06
2017	Games of the Small States of Europe	Serravalle, San Marino	1st	400 m hurdles	52.16
2017	Games of the Small States of Europe	Serravalle, San Marino	1st	4 × 400 m relay	3:15.03
