= Bachana Khorava =

Georgian long jumper (born 1993)

Personal information
- Born: 15 March 1993 (age 33) Chkhorotsqu, Samegrelo-Zemo Svaneti, Georgia
- Height: 1.71 m (5 ft 7 in)
- Weight: 67 kg (148 lb)

Sport
- Sport: Athletics
- Event: Long jump

Bachana Khorava (Georgian: ბაჩანა ხორავა; born 15 March 1993) is a Georgian athlete specialising in the long jump. He represented his country at the 2016 Summer Olympics in Rio de Janeiro. In addition, he won the long jump competition as part of team Georgia at the 2015 European Games (European Team Championships Third League) and won the bronze at the 2015 European U23 Championships. Earlier in his career he competed primarily in sprinting events.

His personal bests in the long jump are 8.24 metres outdoors (+1.3 m/s, Tbilisi 2021) and 8.25 metres indoors (Tbilisi 2016). The latter is the current national record.

== International competitions ==
Year	Competition	Venue	Position	Event	Notes
Representing Georgia
2009	World Youth Championships	Brixen, Italy	60th (h)	100 m	11.34
2009	World Youth Championships	Brixen, Italy	40th (h)	200 m	22.53
2013	European U23 Championships	Tampere, Finland	12th (h)	4 × 400 m relay	3:19.58
2015	European Indoor Championships	Prague, Czech Republic	15th (q)	Long jump	7.63 m
2015	European U23 Championships	Tallinn, Estonia	3rd	Long jump	7.97 m
2016	Championships of the Small States of Europe	Marsa, Malta	1st	Long jump	8.02 m
2016	Olympic Games	Rio de Janeiro, Brazil	19th (q)	Long jump	7.77 m
2018	Championships of the Small States of Europe	Schaan, Liechtenstein	3rd	100 m	10.74 s
2021	European Indoor Championships	Toruń, Poland	14th (q)	Long jump	7.46 m
2021	Olympic Games	Tokyo, Japan	28th (q)	Long jump	7.41 m
2022	Championships of the Small States of Europe	Marsa, Malta	4th	Medley relay	1:58.45
2022	Championships of the Small States of Europe	Marsa, Malta	2nd	Long jump	7.57 m
