= Slađana Perunović =

Montenegrin long-distance runner

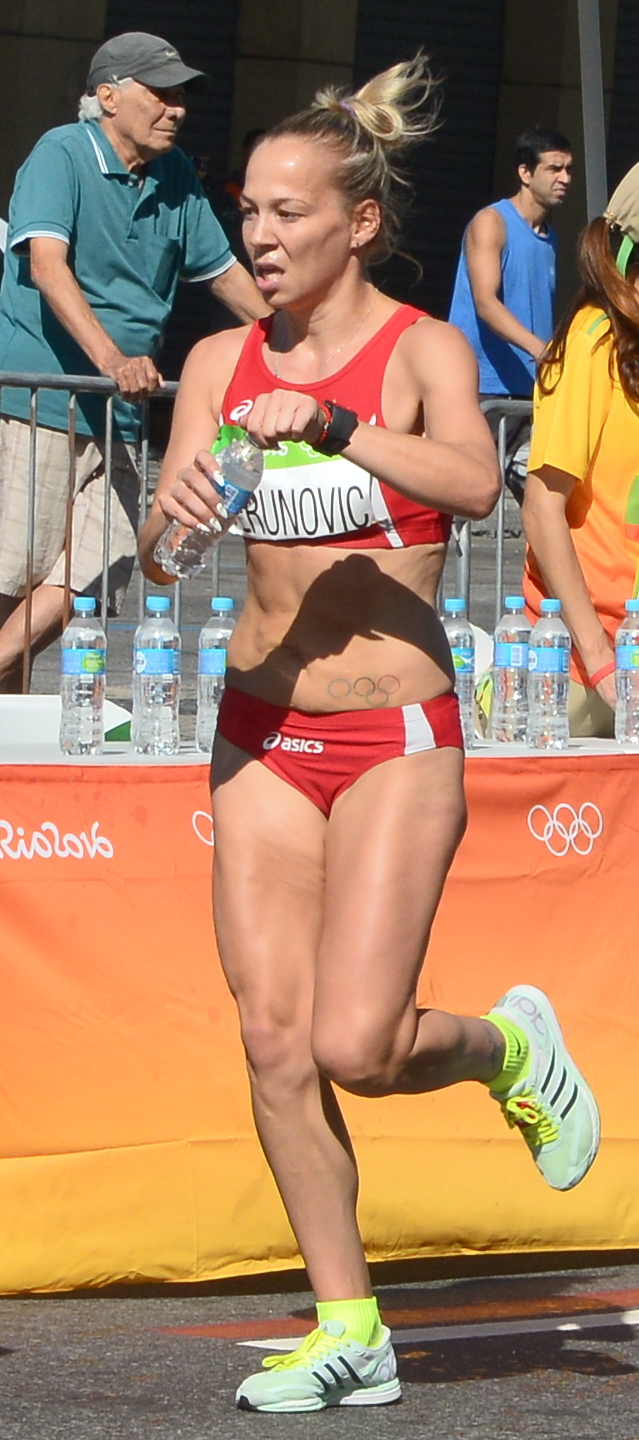
- Perunović at the 2016 Olympics

Personal information
- Nationality: Montenegrin
- Born: 26 March 1984 (age 42) Nikšić, SR Montenegro, SFR Yugoslavia
- Height: 1.70 m (5 ft 7 in)
- Weight: 58 kg (128 lb)

Sport
- Sport: Track, long-distance running
- Events: 800 metres, 1500 metres, 5000 metres, 10,000 metres, marathon
- Club: AK Nikšić
- Coached by: Drago Music

Achievements and titles
- Personal best: Marathon: 2:39:07 (NR)
Medal record
Representing Montenegro
Games of the Small States of Europe
Gold medal – first place	Luxembourg 2013	5000 m
Gold medal – first place	Luxembourg 2013	10000 m
Gold medal – first place	San Marino 2017	5000 m
Bronze medal – third place	San Marino 2017	10000 m

Slađana Perunović-Pejović (born 26 March 1984) is a Montenegrin long-distance runner and holder of several Montenegrin records. She placed 77th out of 118 in the 2012 Olympic marathon. She did not finish her 2016 Olympic marathon.

== Running career ==
The 2009 Summer Universiade was held in Belgrade and she competed in both the women's 800 metres and the women's 1500 metres. At the 2011 Summer Universiade she placed 13th out of 22 runners in the women's half marathon with a time of 1:22:16. Perunović achieved the Olympic "B" standard at the Podgorica Marathon in October 2011, finishing in 2:41:02, therefore gaining a spot on the Montenegro team for the 2012 Summer Olympics. At the 2012 Summer Olympics, she finished the marathon in 2:39:07.

In 2013, Perunović competed in the 2013 Games of the Small States of Europe in Luxembourg, where she competed and won in the 10,000-meter and 5,000 meter races; she ran the 10,000-meter in 35:21.00 and the 5,000 meter in 16:53.20.
