= Charlotte Wingfield =

Maltese sprinter

Charlotte Wingfield OLY
Personal information
- Born: 30 November 1994 (age 31) London, England, United Kingdom
- Education: Cardiff Metropolitan University
- Height: 1.76 m (5 ft 9 1/2 in)
- Weight: 69 kg (152 lb)

Sport
- Country: Malta
- Sport: Sprint
- Event(s): 100 metres, 200 metres
- Coached by: Frank Adams (2011-2013); Matt Elias (2013-2017); James Hillier (2017-2019)

Charlotte Wingfield (born 30 November 1994) is a Maltese sprinter who competes on behalf of the Republic of Malta.

She competed at the 2015 World Championships in Athletics and 2016 IAAF World Indoor Championships. She switched her allegiance from Great Britain in 2015 to represent Malta, her father's country of origin.

She competed for Malta at the 2016 Summer Olympics in Rio de Janeiro in the 100 metres event. She finished 8th in her heat and did not qualify for the semifinals. She was the flag bearer for Malta during the closing ceremony.

== Personal life ==
Born in England, Wingfield is of Maltese descent through her father and holds dual British-Maltese citizenship.

== Competition record ==
Year	Competition	Venue	Position	Event	Notes
Representing Malta
2015	Games of the Small States of Europe	Reykjavík, Iceland	1st	100 m	11.71
2015	Games of the Small States of Europe	Reykjavík, Iceland	1st	200 m	24.19
2015	European U23 Championships	Tallinn, Estonia	9th (h)	100 m	11.78
2015	European U23 Championships	Tallinn, Estonia	19th (sf)	200 m	24.25 (w)
2015	World Championships	Beijing, China	–	100 m	DQ
2016	World Indoor Championships	Portland, United States	36th (h)	60 m	7.63
2016	Championships of the Small States of Europe	Marsa, Malta	3rd	100 m	12.20
2016	Championships of the Small States of Europe	Marsa, Malta	3rd	200 m	24.93
2016	Championships of the Small States of Europe	Marsa, Malta	4th	Medley relay	2:15.78
2016	European Championships	Amsterdam, Netherlands	26th (h)	100 m	11.90
2016	European Championships	Amsterdam, Netherlands	22nd (h)	200 m	24.46
2016	Olympic Games	Rio de Janeiro, Brazil	57th (h)	100 m	11.90
2017	European Indoor Championships	Belgrade, Serbia	27th (h)	60 m	7.50
2017	Games of the Small States of Europe	Serravalle, San Marino	1st	100 m	11.62
2017	Games of the Small States of Europe	Serravalle, San Marino	1st	200 m	23.78
2017	Games of the Small States of Europe	Serravalle, San Marino	2nd	4 × 100 m relay	46.31
2017	World Championships	London, United Kingdom	35th (h)	100 m	11.82
2018	Commonwealth Games	Gold Coast, Australia	14th (h)	100 m	11.64
2018	Commonwealth Games	Gold Coast, Australia	27th (h)	200 m	24.40
2018	Championships of the Small States of Europe	Schaan, Liechtenstein	7th	100 m	11.95
2018	Championships of the Small States of Europe	Schaan, Liechtenstein	3rd	200 m	24.08 (w)
2018	European Championships	Berlin, Germany	24th (h)	200 m	24.40
2019	European Indoor Championships	Glasgow, United Kingdom	41st (h)	60 m	7.67
2019	Games of the Small States of Europe	Bar, Montenegro	5th	100 m	12.00
2019	Games of the Small States of Europe	Bar, Montenegro	4th	200 m	24.66
2019	Games of the Small States of Europe	Bar, Montenegro	4th	4 × 100 m relay	47.92
2021	Championships of the Small States of Europe	Serravalle, San Marino	8th	200 m	25.30
2021	Championships of the Small States of Europe	Serravalle, San Marino	1st	Medley relay	2:10.79
2022	Championships of the Small States of Europe	Marsa, Malta	3rd	200 m	24.41 (w)
2022	Championships of the Small States of Europe	Marsa, Malta	1st	Medley relay	2:10.37
2023	Games of the Small States of Europe	Marsa, Malta	5th	100 m	11.86
2023	Games of the Small States of Europe	Marsa, Malta	1st	4 × 100 m relay	45.39
2024	Championships of the Small States of Europe	Gibraltar	1st	200 m	24.20
2024	Championships of the Small States of Europe	Gibraltar	1st	Medley relay	2:10.62

== Personal bests ==
Outdoor

- 100 metres – 11.54 (+1.1 m/s, Malta, 2017) NR
- 200 metres – 23.78 (+0.3 m/s, San Marino, 2017) NR

Indoor

- 60 metres – 7.44 (Cardiff 2017) NR
- 200 metres – 24.10 (Sheffield 2017) NR
