= Rachel Fitz =

Maltese sprinter

Personal information
- Nationality: Maltese
- Born: 4 May 1995 (age 30)

Sport
- Sport: Track and field
- Event: 60m

Rachel Fitz (born 4 May 1995) is a Maltese sprinter. She competed in the 60 metres event at the 2014 IAAF World Indoor Championships.
