= 1966 European Athletics Championships – Men's 800 metres =

Men's 800 metres at the European Athletics Championships

The men's 800 metres at the 1966 European Athletics Championships was held in Budapest, Hungary, at Népstadion on 2, 3, and 4 September 1966.

== Medalists ==
Gold	Manfred Matuschewski; East Germany
Silver	Franz-Josef Kemper; West Germany
Bronze	Bodo Tümmler; West Germany

== Results ==
=== Final ===
4 September

Rank	Name	Nationality	Time	Notes
1st place, gold medalist(s)	Manfred Matuschewski	East Germany	1:45.9	CR NR
2nd place, silver medalist(s)	Franz-Josef Kemper	West Germany	1:46.0	
3rd place, bronze medalist(s)	Bodo Tümmler	West Germany	1:46.3	
4	Chris Carter	Great Britain	1:46.3	NR
5	Tomáš Jungwirth	Czechoslovakia	1:46.7	NR
6	John Boulter	Great Britain	1:47.0	
7	Alberto Esteban	Spain	1:47.4	NR
8	Noel Carroll	Ireland	1:47.9	

=== Semi-finals ===
3 September

==== Semi-final 1 ====
Rank	Name	Nationality	Time	Notes
1	Franz-Josef Kemper	West Germany	1:47.9	Q
2	Tomáš Jungwirth	Czechoslovakia	1:48.0	Q
3	Chris Carter	Great Britain	1:48.1	Q
4	Noel Carroll	Ireland	1:48.3	Q
5	Vadim Mikhailov	Soviet Union	1:48.7	
6	Mathias Seidler	East Germany	1:48.8	
7	Guy Taillard	France	1:49.2	
8	Maurice Lurot	France	1:49.9	

==== Semi-final 2 ====
Rank	Name	Nationality	Time	Notes
1	Manfred Matuschewski	East Germany	1:49.3	Q
2	John Boulter	Great Britain	1:49.4	Q
3	Bodo Tümmler	West Germany	1:49.5	Q
4	Alberto Esteban	Spain	1:49.5	Q
5	Rein Tölp	Soviet Union	1:49.8	
6	Pavel Penkava	Czechoslovakia	1:49.8	
7	Jürgen May	East Germany	1:50.0	
8	Jean-Michel Pellez	France	1:51.8	

=== Heats ===
2 September

==== Heat 1 ====
Rank	Name	Nationality	Time	Notes
1	Mathias Seidler	East Germany	1:48.3	Q
2	Franz-Josef Kemper	West Germany	1:48.4	Q
3	Jean-Michel Pellez	France	1:48.6	Q
4	Derek McCleane	Ireland	1:48.6	
5	Arne Kvalheim	Norway	1:49.4	
6	Petr Blaha	Czechoslovakia	1:49.9	
7	Marnix Cocquyt	Belgium	1:53.7	

==== Heat 2 ====
Rank	Name	Nationality	Time	Notes
1	Jürgen May	East Germany	1:48.1	Q
2	Guy Taillard	France	1:48.1	Q
3	Pavel Penkava	Czechoslovakia	1:48.2	Q
4	John Boulter	Great Britain	1:48.4	Q
5	Jacques Pennewaert	Belgium	1:48.4	
6	Franco Arese	Italy	1:49.6	
7	Imre Nagy	Hungary	1:50.4	

==== Heat 3 ====
Rank	Name	Nationality	Time	Notes
1	Chris Carter	Great Britain	1:48.7	Q
2	Tomáš Jungwirth	Czechoslovakia	1:48.9	Q
3	Rein Tölp	Soviet Union	1:49.1	Q
4	Hansueli Mumenthaler	Switzerland	1:49.3	
5	Lorant Stoll	Hungary	1:50.3	
6	Heikki Pippola	Finland	1:51.7	
7	Gani Alia	Albania	1:52.4	NR
	Paul Roekaerts	Belgium	DQ	

==== Heat 4 ====
Rank	Name	Nationality	Time	Notes
1	Noel Carroll	Ireland	1:48.1	Q
2	Alberto Esteban	Spain	1:48.2	Q
3	Vadim Mikhailov	Soviet Union	1:48.4	Q
4	Walter Adams	West Germany	1:48.8	
5	Kenth Andersson	Sweden	1:49.0	
6	Erik Zelazny	Poland	1:50.2	
7	Dinos Michaelides	Greece	1:51.9	
8	Jože Međimurec	Yugoslavia	1:53.5	

==== Heat 5 ====
Rank	Name	Nationality	Time	Notes
1	Bodo Tümmler	West Germany	1:48.6	Q
2	Maurice Lurot	France	1:48.8	Q
3	Manfred Matuschewski	East Germany	1:48.9	Q
4	Rudolf Klaban	Austria	1:49.0	
5	Remir Mitrofanov	Soviet Union	1:49.2	
6	Preben Glue	Denmark	1:50.2	
7	Ian Hamilton	Ireland	1:53.7	

== Participation ==
According to an unofficial count, 37 athletes from 21 countries participated in the event.

- Albania (1)
- Austria (1)
- Belgium (3)
- Czechoslovakia (3)
- Denmark (1)
- East Germany (3)
- Finland (1)
- France (3)
- Greece (1)
- Hungary (2)
- Ireland (3)
- Italy (1)
- Norway (1)
- Poland (1)
- Soviet Union (3)
- Spain (1)
- Sweden (1)
- Switzerland (1)
- Great Britain (2)
- West Germany (3)
- Yugoslavia (1)
