= Athletics at the 1960 Summer Olympics – Men's 800 metres =

Men's 800 metres at the Games of the XVII Olympiad
- Venue: Olympic Stadium
- Dates: August 31, 1960 (heats and quarterfinals); September 1, 1960 (semifinals); September 2, 1960 (final)
- Competitors: 51 from 35 nations
- Winning time: 1:46.48 OR

Medalists
1st place, gold medalist(s)		Peter Snell; New Zealand
2nd place, silver medalist(s)		Roger Moens; Belgium
3rd place, bronze medalist(s)		George Kerr; British West Indies

The men's 800 metres middle distance event at the 1960 Olympic Games took place between August 31 and September 2. Fifty-one athletes from 35 nations competed. The maximum number of athletes per nation had been set at 3 since the 1930 Olympic Congress.

All three nations earning medals in 1960 were new to the podium in the event. The event was won by Peter Snell of New Zealand, the nation's first medal in the men's 800 metres. Snell would defend his title in 1964. Roger Moens took silver, earning Belgium's first medal. George Kerr took bronze for the British West Indies, one of only two medals that nation earned in its brief Olympic history (the 4 × 400 metres relay bronze a few days later would be the other). After four straight gold medals from 1936 to 1956, the United States failed to even make the final.

== Summary ==
Only six men were seeded into the final. From the gun Christian Wägli led the pack of five runners off the turn, with only Manfred Matuschewski already beaten. Falling in the back of the pack was Peter Snell from lane 6, the far outside. Wägli held the lead down the final backstretch and through the final turn, with Roger Moens moving in behind him ready to pounce out of a still tight pack. Snell was still at the back, boxed in with George Kerr to his outside. Coming off the turn, Moens pounced, passing Wägli in lane 2 with clear sailing to victory. But Moens' move broke up the pack, it was a free-for-all sprint to the finish. With Wägli struggling on the rail, Snell had a path down lane 1. On the outside Kerr passed Paul Schmidt and was sprinting in lane 3. A surprised Moens looked to his inside to see who the competitor was who was passing him. It was Snell with more power. Moens tried to accelerate again but Snell's strength was too much. Looking at Snell again he leaned for the line but too little too late to catch Snell.

== Background ==
This was the 14th appearance of the event, which is one of 12 athletics events to have been held at every Summer Olympics. None of the finalists from 1956 returned. Roger Moens of Belgium was the favorite; he had set the world record in 1955 but missed the 1956 Games due to injury. George Kerr of Jamaica (then competing as part of the British West Indies) was "expected to be his biggest challenger".

Guyana, Liechtenstein, Morocco, Rhodesia, and Tunisia appeared in the event for the first time; the British West Indies federation competed for the only Games of its existence, though members Jamaica and Trinidad and Tobago had each previously had competitors in the 800 metres. In addition, Wim Esajas had been set to become Suriname's first participant in any Olympic event, but was not informed that his heat had been rescheduled and missed it. Great Britain and the United States each made their 13th appearance, tied for the most among all nations.

== Competition format ==
For the first time, the 800 metres was run over four rounds. The final, which had been 9 men from 1920 to 1952 but was reduced to 8 in 1956, was further reduced to only 6 men in 1960. There were nine first-round heats, each with between 6 and 8 athletes (before withdrawals); the top three runners in each heat advanced to the quarterfinals. There were four quarterfinals, each with 6 or 7 athletes (again, before withdrawals); the top three in each heat advanced to the semifinals. There were two semifinals with 6 athletes each; the top three runners in each semifinal advanced to the six-man final.

== Records ==
These were the standing world and Olympic records (in minutes) prior to the 1948 Summer Olympics.

World record	Roger Moens (BEL)	1:45.7	Oslo, Norway	3 August 1955
Olympic record	Tom Courtney (USA)	1:47.7	Melbourne, Australia	26 November 1956

Six of the 12 semifinalists came in under the Olympic record time, but George Kerr was the first and fastest in that round, setting the record at 1:47.26. That lasted only until the final, however, as all three medalists beat the time. Peter Snell's gold-winning 1:46.48 stood as the new Olympic record after the event.

== Schedule ==
For the first time since 1920, two rounds (round 1 and the quarterfinals) were held on the same day.

All times are Central European Time (UTC+1)

Date	Time	Round
Wednesday, 31 August 1960	11:00; 16:35	Round 1 Quarterfinals
Thursday, 1 September 1960	16:40	Semifinals
Friday, 2 September 1960	16:45	Final

== Results ==
=== Heats ===
The fastest three runners in each of the nine heats advanced to the quarterfinal round.

==== Heat 1 ====
Lambrechts ran in heat 2. Parsch ran in heat 7.

Rank	Athlete	Nation	Time	Notes
1	Donal Smith	New Zealand	1:51.86	Q
2	Valery Bulyshev	Soviet Union	1:51.83	Q
3	Zbigniew Makomaski	Poland	1:52.70	Q
4	Brian Hewson	Great Britain	1:54.73	
5	Yair Pantilat	Israel	1:54.86	
6	George Johnson	Liberia	1:56.04	
—	Jos Lambrechts	Belgium	DNS	
—	Péter Parsch	Hungary	DNS	

==== Heat 2 ====
Rank	Athlete	Nation	Time	Notes
1	Tom Farrell	Great Britain	1:49.05	Q
2	Jerry Siebert	United States	1:49.08	Q
3	Jos Lambrechts	Belgium	1:49.24	Q
4	Pierre-Yvon Lenoir	France	1:49.41	
5	Jaromír Šlégr	Czechoslovakia	1:50.23	
6	Moussa Said	Ethiopia	1:50.49	

==== Heat 3 ====
Rank	Athlete	Nation	Time	Notes
1	Peter Snell	New Zealand	1:48.22	Q
2	Christian Wägli	Switzerland	1:48.88	Q
3	Ernie Cunliffe	United States	1:48.95	Q
4	István Rózsavölgyi	Hungary	1:49.51	
—	Ismael Delgado	Puerto Rico	DNS	
—	Abdul Ghafar Ghafoori	Afghanistan	DNS	

==== Heat 4 ====
Rank	Athlete	Nation	Time	Notes
1	Tony Blue	Australia	1:50.82	Q
2	Ergas Leps	Canada	1:50.93	Q
3	Manfred Matuschewski	United Team of Germany	1:51.17	Q
4	Vasily Savinkov	Soviet Union	1:51.49	
5	Konstantinos Moragiemos	Greece	1:54.60	
6	Ahmed Lazreg	Morocco	1:55.91	

==== Heat 5 ====
Rank	Athlete	Nation	Time	Notes
1	Abram Kryvosheiev	Soviet Union	1:53.49	Q
2	Jörg Balke	United Team of Germany	1:53.72	Q
3	John Wenk	Great Britain	1:54.27	Q
4	Norbert Haupert	Luxembourg	1:54.83	
5	Frederick Owusu	Ghana	1:55.41	
6	Egon Oehri	Liechtenstein	2:00.49	

==== Heat 6 ====
Rank	Athlete	Nation	Time	Notes
1	Roger Moens	Belgium	1:50.73	Q
2	Per Knuts	Sweden	1:51.36	Q
3	Lajos Kovács	Hungary	1:51.45	Q
4	Stefan Lewandowski	Poland	1:51.75	
5	Svavar Markússon	Iceland	1:52.88	
6	Abdeslem Dargouth	Tunisia	1:54.87	

==== Heat 7 ====
Rank	Athlete	Nation	Time	Notes
1	George Kerr	British West Indies	1:51.11	Q
2	Terry Sullivan	Rhodesia	1:51.26	Q
3	Péter Parsch	Hungary	1:51.34	Q
4	Borut Ingolič	Yugoslavia	1:51.51	
5	Pertti Ålander	Finland	1:52.20	
6	Zbigniew Orywał	Poland	1:55.89	
—	A. Nur Farah	Somalia	DNS	

==== Heat 8 ====
Rank	Athlete	Nation	Time	Notes
1	Paul Schmidt	United Team of Germany	1:50.97	Q
2	Rudolf Klaban	Austria	1:50.96	Q
3	Ronnie Delany	Ireland	1:51.19	Q
4	Joe Mullins	Canada	1:51.46	
5	Gianfranco Baraldi	Italy	1:52.15	
6	Julio Gómez	Spain	1:53.90	
7	Somsakdi Tongaram	Thailand	1:57.24	

==== Heat 9 ====
Rank	Athlete	Nation	Time	Notes
1	Tom Murphy	United States	1:52.30	Q
2	Ralph Gomes	Guyana	1:53.06	Q
3	Ekrem Koçak	Turkey	1:59.12	Q
4	Sig Ohlemann	Canada	2:07.40	
—	Julian Brown	Bahamas	DNS	
—	Wim Esajas	Suriname	DNS	

=== Quarterfinals ===
The fastest three runners in each of the four heats advanced to the semifinal round.

==== Quarterfinal 1 ====
Rank	Athlete	Nation	Time	Notes
1	Tom Murphy	United States	1:48.12	Q
2	Christian Wägli	Switzerland	1:48.15	Q
3	Manfred Matuschewski	United Team of Germany	1:48.24	Q
4	Donal Smith	New Zealand	1:48.52	
5	Terry Sullivan	Rhodesia	1:50.01	
—	Jos Lambrechts	Belgium	DNS	
—	Péter Parsch	Hungary	DNS	

==== Quarterfinal 2 ====
Rank	Athlete	Nation	Time	Notes
1	Paul Schmidt	United Team of Germany	1:51.38	Q
2	Abram Krivosheyev	Soviet Union	1:51.40	Q
3	Jerry Siebert	United States	1:51.53	Q
4	Zbigniew Makomaski	Poland	1:51.72	
5	Ralph Gomes	Guyana	1:52.47	
6	Lajos Kovács	Hungary	1:52.55	
7	Per Knuts	Sweden	1:52.91	

==== Quarterfinal 3 ====
Rank	Athlete	Nation	Time	Notes
1	George Kerr	British West Indies	1:49.58	Q
2	Ernie Cunliffe	United States	1:49.83	Q
3	Tony Blue	Australia	1:50.05	Q
4	John Wenk	Great Britain	1:50.13	
5	Valery Bulyshev	Soviet Union	1:50.74	
6	Ronnie Delany	Ireland	1:51.42	

==== Quarterfinal 4 ====
Rank	Athlete	Nation	Time	Notes
1	Roger Moens	Belgium	1:48.69	Q
2	Peter Snell	New Zealand	1:48.84	Q
3	Jörg Balke	United Team of Germany	1:48.98	Q
4	Rudolf Klaban	Austria	1:50.32	
5	Tom Farrell	Great Britain	1:50.84	
6	Ergas Leps	Canada	1:52.13	
7	Ekrem Koçak	Turkey	1:52.66	

=== Semifinals ===
The fastest three runners in each of the two heats advanced to the final round.

==== Semifinal 1 ====
Rank	Athlete	Nation	Time	Notes
1	George Kerr	British West Indies	1:47.26	Q, OR
2	Christian Wägli	Switzerland	1:47.40	Q
3	Manfred Matuschewski	United Team of Germany	1:47.54	Q
4	Jörg Balke	United Team of Germany	1:47.63	
5	Tony Blue	Australia	1:47.97	
6	Tom Murphy	United States	1:48.29	

==== Semifinal 2 ====
Rank	Athlete	Nation	Time	Notes
1	Peter Snell	New Zealand	1:47.34	Q
2	Roger Moens	Belgium	1:47.49	Q
3	Paul Schmidt	United Team of Germany	1:47.95	Q
4	Jerry Siebert	United States	1:48.20	
5	Abram Krivosheyev	Soviet Union	1:48.25	
6	Ernie Cunliffe	United States	1:50.92	

=== Final ===
Rank	Athlete	Nation	Time	Notes
1st place, gold medalist(s)	Peter Snell	New Zealand	1:46.48	OR
2nd place, silver medalist(s)	Roger Moens	Belgium	1:46.55	
3rd place, bronze medalist(s)	George Kerr	British West Indies	1:47.25	
4	Paul Schmidt	United Team of Germany	1:47.82	
5	Christian Wägli	Switzerland	1:48.19	
6	Manfred Matuschewski	United Team of Germany	1:52.21	
