= Athletics at the 1964 Summer Olympics – Men's 800 metres =

Men's 800 metres at the Games of the XVIII Olympiad
- Venue: Olympic Stadium
- Dates: 14–16 October 1964
- Competitors: 47 from 32 nations
- Winning time: 1:45.1 OR

Medalists
1st place, gold medalist(s)		Peter Snell; New Zealand
2nd place, silver medalist(s)		Bill Crothers; Canada
3rd place, bronze medalist(s)		Wilson Kiprugut; Kenya

The men's 800 metres was the middle of the seven men's track races in the Athletics at the 1964 Summer Olympics program in Tokyo. 47 athletes from 32 nations competed. The maximum number of athletes per nation had been set at 3 since the 1930 Olympic Congress. The first round was held on 14 October, with the semifinals on 15 October and the final on 16 October. The event was won by Peter Snell of New Zealand, successfully defending his 1960 gold medal (the third man to do so), and completing the first half of his 800 metres/1500 metres double. Bill Crothers of Canada took silver, the first 800 metres medal for that nation since 1936 and matching Canada's best-ever result in the event (silver in 1932). Wilson Kiprugut's bronze was the first medal by Kenya in any event; Kenya would become a frequent fixture on the men's 800 metres podium.

== Summary ==
The runners used a crouch start without blocks and a single turn stagger start (breaking after the first turn). Returning to the final from four years earlier were defending champion Peter Snell and bronze medalist George Kerr. While Snell started strongly, he found himself in third place at the break, led by aggressive front-running by Wilson Kiprugut. As others moved forward, Snell found himself boxed along the rail, so as the runners came onto the home stretch he had to slow to come out the back of the box, then as the bell approached, he glided along the outside to catch up to Kiprugut and Kerr in the lead. With free running room, Snell kept going, taking the lead on the penultimate turn. After establishing a three-metre lead, he held his position, even extending it a little to take the repeat gold. Down the backstretch, Bill Crothers made his way around Kiprugut while Kerr was trying to chase down Snell. Crothers came off the final turn with more speed, passing Kerr on the home stretch. Kerr began to struggle. Snell was too far ahead for Crothers to catch, but Kiprugut closed down on Kerr, passing him and sealing the bronze medal with a dip at the finish.

Snell became the third to defend his 800-metre title after Douglas Lowe and Mal Whitfield. The feat would not be accomplished again for 52 years until David Rudisha repeated in 2016. Kiprugut won Kenya's first ever Olympic medal, unleashing a floodgate of national dominance in distance running events, particularly the 3000 meters steeplechase in subsequent Olympics.

== Background ==
This was the 15th appearance of the event, which is one of 12 athletics events to have been held at every Summer Olympics. Three finalists from 1960 returned: gold medalist Peter Snell of New Zealand, bronze medalist George Kerr of Jamaica, and sixth-place finisher Manfred Matuschewski of the United Team of Germany. Snell had broken the 800 metres world record as well as the one-mile world record, and was a favorite to repeat.

Chad, Colombia, Hong Kong, Iran, Malaysia, Mongolia, and Tanzania appeared in the event for the first time. Great Britain and the United States each made their 14th appearance, tied for the most among all nations.

== Competition format ==
After one Games of a four-round format in 1960, the competition returned to the three-round format used in most Games since 1912 (other than 1960, the only other deviation was in 1936 when there were only two rounds due to a small number of entrants). The final, which had been 9 men from 1920 to 1952, 8 in 1956, and only 6 in 1960, was back up to 8 men. The 1964 competition introduced the "fastest loser" system, used only in the semifinals at this edition. Previously, advancement depended solely on the runners' place in their heat. The 1964 competition added advancement places to the fastest runners across the heats in the semifinals who did not advance based on place.

There were six first-round heats, each with 7 or 8 athletes; the top four runners in each heat advanced to the semifinals. There were three semifinals with 8 athletes each; the top two runners in each semifinal, and the next two fastest overall, advanced to the eight-man final.

== Records ==
These were the standing world and Olympic records (in minutes) prior to the 1948 Summer Olympics.

World record	Peter Snell (NZL)	1:44.3	Christchurch, New Zealand	2 February 1962
Olympic record	Peter Snell (NZL)	1:46.48	Rome, Italy	2 September 1960

In the second semifinal, George Kerr and Wilson Kiprugut each finished at 1:46.1 to set a new, though short-lived, Olympic record. The final saw four runners break that new record, with Peter Snell's gold-medal winning 1:45.1 the new record afterward.

== Schedule ==
All times are Japan Standard Time (UTC+9)

Date	Time	Round
Wednesday, 14 October 1964	15:30	Round 1
Thursday, 15 October 1964	15:00	Semifinals
Friday, 16 October 1964	16:40	Final

== Results ==
=== First round ===
The top four runners in each of the 6 heats advanced.

==== Heat 1 ====
Rank	Athlete	Nation	Time	Notes
1	Wilson Kiprugut	Kenya	1:47.8	Q
2	Tom Farrell	United States	1:48.6	Q
3	Valery Bulyshev	Soviet Union	1:48.6	Q
4	Joseph Lambrechts	Belgium	1:48.9	Q
5	François Châtelet	France	1:48.9	
6	Ebrahim Yazdanpanah	Iran	1:54.7	
7	Hugo Walser	Liechtenstein	1:57.5	
8	Nipon Pensuvabharp	Thailand	1:58.8	

==== Heat 2 ====
Rank	Athlete	Nation	Time	Notes
1	Dieter Bogatzki	United Team of Germany	1:50.3	Q
2	Stig Lindback	Sweden	1:50.8	Q
3	Chris Carter	Great Britain	1:51.0	Q
4	Pekka Juutilainen	Finland	1:51.0	Q
5	Neville Myton	Jamaica	1:52.4	
6	Michel Medinger	Luxembourg	1:52.6	
7	Dulamyn Amarsanaa	Mongolia	1:56.3	
8	Anar Khan	Pakistan	1:56.4	

==== Heat 3 ====
Rank	Athlete	Nation	Time	Notes
1	Manfred Kinder	United Team of Germany	1:49.5	Q
2	Ahmed Issa	Chad	1:49.7	Q
3	Derek McCleane	Ireland	1:49.9	Q
4	Rein Tölp	Soviet Union	1:50.0	Q
5	Peter Francis	Kenya	1:50.1	
6	Morgan Groth	United States	1:51.4	
7	José Neira	Colombia	1:55.6	
8	Ramasamy Subramaniam	Malaysia	1:58.5	

==== Heat 4 ====
Rank	Athlete	Nation	Time	Notes
1	Peter Snell	New Zealand	1:49.0	Q
2	Jerome Francis Siebert	United States	1:49.2	Q
3	Jacques Pennewaert	Belgium	1:49.2	Q
4	Abram Krivosheev	Soviet Union	1:49.5	Q
5	Alan Dean	Great Britain	1:49.6	
6	Jeong Gyo-mo	South Korea	1:51.8	
7	Don Bertoia	Canada	1:52.2	
8	Sebsibe Mamo	Ethiopia	1:52.8	

==== Heat 5 ====
Rank	Athlete	Nation	Time	Notes
1	John Boulter	Great Britain	1:48.9	Q
2	George E. Kerr	Jamaica	1:48.9	Q
3	Tony Blue	Australia	1:49.7	Q
4	Manfred Matuschewski	United Team of Germany	1:50.0	Q
5	Noel Carroll	Ireland	1:51.1	
6	Rolf Jelinek	Switzerland	1:54.6	
—	Amos Gilad	Israel	DNF	

==== Heat 6 ====
Rank	Athlete	Nation	Time	Notes
1	William Crothers	Canada	1:49.3	Q
2	Maurice Lurot	France	1:49.8	Q
3	Mamoru Morimoto	Japan	1:49.9	Q
4	Rudolf Klaban	Austria	1:49.9	Q
5	Francesco Bianchi	Italy	1:50.2	
6	Paul Roekaerts	Belgium	1:50.9	
7	Patrick Field	Hong Kong	1:54.0	
8	Hassan Dyamwale	Tanzania	1:54.9	

=== Semifinals ===
The top two runners in each of the three semifinals qualified for the final, as did the two runners with the fastest times from among the 3rd-8th spots across all of the semifinals.

==== Semifinal 1 ====
Rank	Athlete	Nation	Time	Notes
1	Peter Snell	New Zealand	1:46.9	Q
2	Jerome Francis Siebert	United States	1:47.0	Q
3	Jacques Pennewaert	Belgium	1:47.0	q
4	Manfred Matuschewski	United Team of Germany	1:47.3	
5	Valery Bulyshev	Soviet Union	1:47.5	
6	Morimoto Mamoru	Japan	1:47.7	
7	Maurice Lurot	France	1:49.7	
8	Stig Lindback	Sweden	1:49.8	

==== Semifinal 2 ====
Kerr and Kiprugut both crossed the finish line in 1:46.1, breaking the old Olympic record of 1:46.3.

Rank	Athlete	Nation	Time	Notes
1	George E. Kerr	Jamaica	1:46.1	Q, OR
2	Wilson Kiprugut	Kenya	1:46.1	Q, OR
3	Dieter Bogatzki	United Team of Germany	1:46.9	q
4	John Peter Boulter	Great Britain	1:47.1	
5	Rudolf Klaban	Austria	1:47.4	
6	Abram Krivosheev	Soviet Union	1:47.5	
7	Derek George McCleane	Ireland	1:48.4	
8	Pekka Juutilainen	Finland	1:50.3	

==== Semifinal 3 ====
Rank	Athlete	Nation	Time	Notes
1	William Crothers	Canada	1:47.3	Q
2	Tom Farrell	United States	1:47.8	Q
3	Manfred Kinder	United Team of Germany	1:47.9	
4	Chris Carter	Great Britain	1:49.1	
5	Rein Tölp	Soviet Union	1:49.1	
6	Ahmed Issa	Chad	1:49.4	
7	Tony Blue	Australia	1:49.6	
8	Joseph Lambrechts	Belgium	1:52.8	

=== Final ===
No fewer than four runners broke the Olympic record that had been set in the semifinals, including the two runners that had set it. Despite the record performances by the other three runners, defending Olympic champion and world record holder Peter Snell still won by half a second to take the gold medal and set the new Olympic record at 1:45.1.

Rank	Athlete	Nation	Time	Notes
1st place, gold medalist(s)	Peter Snell	New Zealand	1:45.1	OR
2nd place, silver medalist(s)	William Crothers	Canada	1:45.6	
3rd place, bronze medalist(s)	Wilson Kiprugut	Kenya	1:45.9	
4	George E. Kerr	Jamaica	1:45.9	
5	Tom Farrell	United States	1:46.6	
6	Jerome Francis Siebert	United States	1:47.0	
7	Dieter Bogatzki	United Team of Germany	1:47.2	
8	Jacques Pennewaert	Belgium	1:50.5	
