= Athletics at the 1960 Summer Olympics – Men's 1500 metres =

Men's 1500 metres at the Games of the XVII Olympiad
- Olympic Athletics
- Venue: Olympic Stadium
- Dates: September 3, 1960 (final) (heats); September 6, 1960 (final)
- Competitors: 39 from 25 nations
- Winning time: 3:35.6 WR

Medalists
1st place, gold medalist(s)		Herb Elliott; Australia
2nd place, silver medalist(s)		Michel Jazy; France
3rd place, bronze medalist(s)		István Rózsavölgyi; Hungary

The men's 1500 metres was an event at the 1960 Summer Olympics, held on 3 and 6 September. Thirty-nine athletes from 25 nations competed. The maximum number of athletes per nation had been set at 3 since the 1930 Olympic Congress. The event was won by Herb Elliott of Australia, the nation's second victory in the 1500 metres and first since 1896. Michel Jazy of France took silver, the third time a French athlete had achieved that mark. Hungary won its first 1500 metres medal with István Rózsavölgyi's bronze.

== Summary ==
The 1500 final was much more of an endurance race than contemporary strategic races. Michel Bernard took the lead from the beginning and dared the field to stay with him. Arne Hamarsland and Jim Grelle struggled as the pack strung out quickly. With two laps to go, Herb Elliott upped the ante, taking the lead and pushing the pace. István Rózsavölgyi was the last to drop off with Jazy close behind Rózsavölgyi. But Elliott was gone, cleanly ahead going into the final lap. Waiting on the final backstretch, his coach Percy Cerutty prearranged that he would wave a yellow towel if Elliott was in danger of being caught from behind or close to the world record. A confused Elliott saw the towel and accelerated, pushing hard to the finish. Elliott's three second victory took an additional half second out of his own world record. His record would last for seven years before being improved upon by Jim Ryun. Behind Elliott, Jazy managed to catch Rózsavölgyi for the silver medal.

== Background ==
This was the 14th appearance of the event, which is one of 12 athletics events to have been held at every Summer Olympics. Twelfth-place finisher Merv Lincoln of Australia was the only finalist from 1956 to return, though multiple semifinalists did. Lincoln's countryman Herb Elliott was the "overwhelming favorite" in the race; he had taken the world records in both the 1500 metres and the mile in 1958 and never lost a race at either distance. Lincoln, as well as Michel Jazy of France and István Rózsavölgyi of Hungary (who had both competed in 1956 without making the final), were expected to compete for silver.

Iraq, Israel, Liechtenstein, Rhodesia, Romania, and Tunisia each made their first appearance in the event. The United States made its 14th appearance, the only nation to have competed in the men's 1500 metres at each Games to that point.

== Competition format ==
The competition used the two-round format that had been in place since 1908 (except for one three-round version in 1952). There were three heats with 14 or 15 runners each (before withdrawals), with the top three runners in each advancing to the final race; the 9-man final was reduced from previous versions of the competition which used a 12-man final.

== Records ==
These were the standing world and Olympic records prior to the 1960 Summer Olympics.

World record	Herb Elliott (AUS)	3:36.0	Gothenburg, Sweden	28 August 1958
Olympic record	Ron Delany (IRL)	3:41.2	Melbourne, Australia	1 December 1956

During the final, Herb Elliott broke his own world record by 0.4 seconds, running 3:35.6. The top six men in the final all surpassed the old Olympic record.

== Schedule ==
All times are Central European Time (UTC+1)

Date	Time	Round
Saturday, 3 September 1960	17:15	Semifinals
Tuesday, 6 September 1960	16:15	Final

== Results ==
=== Semifinals ===
The fastest three runners in each of the three heats advanced to the final round.

==== Semifinal 1 ====
Rank	Athlete	Nation	Time	Notes
1	Herb Elliott	Australia	3:41.50	Q
2	István Rózsavölgyi	Hungary	3:42.15	Q
3	Dyrol Burleson	United States	3:42.40	Q
4	Terry Sullivan	Rhodesia	3:42.96	
5	Yevgeny Momotkov	Soviet Union	3:43.80	
6	Olavi Salonen	Finland	3:46.57	
7	Rudolf Klaban	Austria	3:47.24	
8	Arthur Hannemann	United Team of Germany	3:47.57	
9	Laurie Reed	Great Britain	3:48.24	
10	Joe Mullins	Canada	3:53.45	
11	Tomás Barris	Spain	3:56.10	
12	Mohamed Gouider	Tunisia	3:58.52	
—	Zbigniew Orywał	Poland	DNF	
—	Abdul Ghafar Ghafoori	Afghanistan	DNS	

==== Semifinal 2 ====
Rank	Athlete	Nation	Time	Notes
1	Michel Bernard	France	3:42.34	Q
2	Jim Grelle	United States	3:43.65	Q
3	Arne Hamarsland	Norway	3:44.63	Q
4	Brian Kent-Smith	Great Britain	3:46.21	
5	Albie Thomas	Australia	3:46.95	
6	Siegfried Valentin	United Team of Germany	3:46.99	
7	Svavar Markússon	Iceland	3:47.20	
8	Alfredo Rizzo	Italy	3:47.56	
9	Andrei Barabaș	Romania	3:47.71	
10	Muharrem Dalkılıç	Turkey	3:47.18	
11	Dhira Phiphobmongkol	Thailand	4:24.4	
—	Péter Parsch	Hungary	DNF	
—	Egon Oehri	Liechtenstein	DNF	
—	Ralph Gomes	Guyana	DNS	
—	Roger Moens	Belgium	DNS	

==== Semifinal 3 ====
Rank	Athlete	Nation	Time	Notes
1	Dan Waern	Sweden	3:44.18	Q
2	Michel Jazy	France	3:45.03	Q
3	Zoltan Vamoș	Romania	3:45.07	Q
4	Adolf Schwarte	United Team of Germany	3:45.46	
5	Lajos Kovács	Hungary	3:46.20	
6	Mike Wiggs	Great Britain	3:46.61	
7	Merv Lincoln	Australia	3:47.18	
8	Evangelos Depastas	Greece	3:48.77	
9	Pete Close	United States	3:50.69	
10	Olavi Vuorisalo	Finland	3:52.68	
11	Stefan Lewandowski	Poland	3:59.75	
12	Yair Pantilat	Israel	4:00.14	
13	Kassim Mukhtar	Iraq	4:00.33	
—	Karl Schaller	Switzerland	DNS	

=== Final ===
Rank	Athlete	Nation	Time	Notes
1st place, gold medalist(s)	Herb Elliott	Australia	3:35.6	WR
2nd place, silver medalist(s)	Michel Jazy	France	3:38.4	
3rd place, bronze medalist(s)	István Rózsavölgyi	Hungary	3:39.2	
4	Dan Waern	Sweden	3:40.0	
5	Zoltan Vamoș	Romania	3:40.8	
6	Dyrol Burleson	United States	3:40.9	
7	Michel Bernard	France	3:41.5	
8	Jim Grelle	United States	3:45.0	
9	Arne Hamarsland	Norway	3:45.0	
