= 1962 European Athletics Championships – Men's 800 metres =

Men's 800 metres at the European Athletics Championships

The men's 800 metres at the 1962 European Athletics Championships was held in Belgrade, then Yugoslavia, at JNA Stadium on 13, 14, and 15 September 1962.

== Medalists ==
Gold	Manfred Matuschewski; East Germany
Silver	Valeriy Bulyshev; Soviet Union
Bronze	Paul Schmidt; West Germany

== Results ==
=== Final ===
15 September

Rank	Name	Nationality	Time	Notes
1st place, gold medalist(s)	Manfred Matuschewski	East Germany	1:50.5	
2nd place, silver medalist(s)	Valeriy Bulyshev	Soviet Union	1:51.2	
3rd place, bronze medalist(s)	Paul Schmidt	West Germany	1:51.2	
4	Olavi Salonen	Finland	1:51.2	
5	Derek McCleane	Ireland	1:51.3	
6	Abram Krivosheyev	Soviet Union	1:51.5	

=== Semi-finals ===
14 September

==== Semi-final 1 ====
Rank	Name	Nationality	Time	Notes
1	Olavi Salonen	Finland	1:51.6	Q
2	Manfred Matuschewski	East Germany	1:51.6	Q
3	Valeriy Bulyshev	Soviet Union	1:52.1	Q
4	Norbert Haupert	Luxembourg	1:52.2	
5	François Châtelet	France	1:52.2	
6	Sid Purkis	Great Britain	1:52.3	

==== Semi-final 2 ====
Rank	Name	Nationality	Time	Notes
1	Paul Schmidt	West Germany	1:50.0	Q
2	Derek McCleane	Ireland	1:50.1	Q
3	Abram Krivosheyev	Soviet Union	1:50.1	Q
4	Tony Harris	Great Britain	1:50.2	
5	Josef Odložil	Czechoslovakia	1:51.0	
6	Volker Tulzer	Austria	1:51.1	

=== Heats ===
13 September

==== Heat 1 ====
Rank	Name	Nationality	Time	Notes
1	Norbert Haupert	Luxembourg	1:53.0	Q
2	Olavi Salonen	Finland	1:53.3	Q
3	Noel Carroll	Ireland	1:53.9	
3	Klaus Widera	East Germany	1:53.9	
5	Franz Bucheli	Switzerland	1:54.2	

==== Heat 2 ====
Rank	Name	Nationality	Time	Notes
1	Sid Purkis	Great Britain	1:54.5	Q
2	Paul Schmidt	West Germany	1:55.7	Q
3	Jan Kasal	Czechoslovakia	1:55.7	

==== Heat 3 ====
Rank	Name	Nationality	Time	Notes
1	Valeriy Bulyshev	Soviet Union	1:51.0	Q
2	Volker Tulzer	Austria	1:51.0	Q
3	Francesco Bianchi	Italy	1:51.3	
4	Gilbert Iundt	France	1:52.6	

==== Heat 4 ====
Rank	Name	Nationality	Time	Notes
1	Josef Odložil	Czechoslovakia	1:51.8	Q
2	Manfred Matuschewski	East Germany	1:51.8	Q
3	Trevor Schofield	Great Britain	1:51.9	
4	Hugo Walser	Liechtenstein	1:56.8	

==== Heat 5 ====
Rank	Name	Nationality	Time	Notes
1	Abram Krivosheyev	Soviet Union	1:58.5	Q
2	Tony Harris	Great Britain	1:58.6	Q
3	Jaromír Šlégr	Czechoslovakia	1:58.8	
4	Maurice Lurot	France	1:58.8	

==== Heat 6 ====
Rank	Name	Nationality	Time	Notes
1	Derek McCleane	Ireland	1:50.8	Q
2	François Châtelet	France	1:51.3	Q
3	Alberto Esteban	Spain	1:51.9	
	Joseph Lambrechts	Belgium	DNF	

== Participation ==
According to an unofficial count, 24 athletes from 15 countries participated in the event.

- Austria (1)
- Belgium (1)
- Czechoslovakia (3)
- East Germany (2)
- Finland (1)
- France (3)
- Ireland (2)
- Italy (1)
- Liechtenstein (1)
- Luxembourg (1)
- Soviet Union (2)
- Spain (1)
- Switzerland (1)
- Great Britain (3)
- West Germany (1)
