= 1958 European Athletics Championships – Men's 1500 metres =

1958 men's 1500 metres

Men's 1500 metres at the European Athletics Championships

The men's 1500 metres at the 1958 European Athletics Championships was held in Stockholm, Sweden, at Stockholms Olympiastadion on 22 and 24 August 1958.

== Medalists ==
Gold	Brian Hewson; Great Britain
Silver	Dan Waern; Sweden
Bronze	Ron Delany; Ireland

== Results ==
=== Final ===
24 August

Rank	Name	Nationality	Time	Notes
1st place, gold medalist(s)	Brian Hewson	Great Britain	3:41.9	
2nd place, silver medalist(s)	Dan Waern	Sweden	3:42.1	
3rd place, bronze medalist(s)	Ron Delany	Ireland	3:42.3	
4	István Rózsavölgyi	Hungary	3:42.7	
5	Olavi Vuorisalo	Finland	3:42.8	
6	Siegfried Herrmann	East Germany	3:43.4	
7	Zbigniew Orywał	Poland	3:43.7	
8	Stanislav Jungwirth	Czechoslovakia	3:44.4	
9	Ulf-Bertil Lundh	Norway	3:44.7	
10	Michel Jazy	France	3:45.4	
11	Lajos Kovács	Hungary	3:51.6	
12	Olavi Salsola	Finland	3:53.9	

=== Heats ===
22 August

==== Heat 1 ====
Rank	Name	Nationality	Time	Notes
1	Olavi Vuorisalo	Finland	3:40.8	CR Q
2	Brian Hewson	Great Britain	3:41.1	NR Q
3	István Rózsavölgyi	Hungary	3:41.5	Q
4	Arne Hamarsland	Norway	3:41.9	NR
5	Gianfranco Baraldi	Italy	3:42.3	NR
6	Roger Verheuen	Belgium	3:43.0	NR
7	Simo Važić	Yugoslavia	3:45.7	
8	Rudolf Klaban	Austria	3:48.2	
9	Cesáreo Marín	Spain	3:53.4	

==== Heat 2 ====
Rank	Name	Nationality	Time	Notes
1	Ron Delany	Ireland	3:47.0	Q
2	Olavi Salsola	Finland	3:47.5	Q
3	Ulf-Bertil Lundh	Norway	3:47.8	Q
4	Joško Murat	Yugoslavia	3:48.2	
5	Klaus Richtzenhain	East Germany	3:49.0	
6	Ingvar Ericsson	Sweden	3:49.1	
7	Alfred Langenus	Belgium	3:52.5	
8	Ernst Kleiner	Switzerland	3:53.7	

==== Heat 3 ====
Rank	Name	Nationality	Time	Notes
1	Dan Waern	Sweden	3:42.3	Q
2	Siegfried Herrmann	East Germany	3:42.5	Q
3	Lajos Kovács	Hungary	3:43.0	Q
4	Stefan Lewandowski	Poland	3:43.2	
5	Tomás Barris	Spain	3:44.5	NR
6	Mike Blagrove	Great Britain	3:45.2	
7	Alfredo Rizzo	Italy	3:50.5	
8	André Guilhaumon	France	3:50.6	

==== Heat 4 ====
Rank	Name	Nationality	Time	Notes
1	Stanislav Jungwirth	Czechoslovakia	3:49.0	Q
2	Zbigniew Orywał	Poland	3:49.3	Q
3	Michel Jazy	France	3:49.5	Q
4	Ionas Pipyne	Soviet Union	3:49.6	
5	Mijndert Blankenstein	Netherlands	3:50.2	
6	Dimitrios Konstantinidis	Greece	3:50.5	
7	Svavar Markússon	Iceland	3:51.4	
8	Muharrem Dalkılıç	Turkey	3:52.6	

== Participation ==
According to an unofficial count, 33 athletes from 21 countries participated in the event.

- Austria (1)
- Belgium (1)
- Czechoslovakia (1)
- East Germany (2)
- Finland (2)
- France (2)
- Greece (1)
- Hungary (2)
- Iceland (1)
- Ireland (1)
- Italy (2)
- Netherlands (2)
- Norway (2)
- Poland (2)
- Soviet Union (1)
- Spain (2)
- Sweden (2)
- Switzerland (1)
- Turkey (1)
- Great Britain (2)
- Yugoslavia (2)
