= 1966 European Indoor Games – Men's 800 metres =

The men's 800 metres event at the 1966 European Indoor Games was held on 27 March in Dortmund.

== Medalists ==
Gold	Silver	Bronze
Noel Carroll; Ireland	Tomáš Jungwirth; Czechoslovakia	Herbert Missalla; West Germany

== Results ==
=== Heats ===
The first 2 from each heat (Q) and the next 3 fastest (q) qualified for the final.

Rank	Heat	Name	Nationality	Time	Notes
1	1	Herbert Missalla	West Germany	1:54.8	Q
2	1	Noel Carroll	Ireland	1:54.9	Q
3	1	Gérard Vervoort	France	1:56.7	q
	1	Karel Brems	Belgium	DNF	
1	2	Alberto Estebán	Spain	1:53.9	Q
2	2	Tomáš Jungwirth	Czechoslovakia	1:54.7	Q
3	2	Arnd Krüger	West Germany	1:55.1	q
4	2	Imre Nagy	Hungary	1:55.8	q

=== Final ===
Rank	Name	Nationality	Time	Notes
1st place, gold medalist(s)	Noel Carroll	Ireland	1:49.7	
2nd place, silver medalist(s)	Tomáš Jungwirth	Czechoslovakia	1:50.8	
3rd place, bronze medalist(s)	Herbert Missalla	West Germany	1:51.0	
4	Alberto Estebán	Spain	1:51.3	
5	Gérard Vervoort	France	1:52.4	
6	Imre Nagy	Hungary	1:52.9	
	Arnd Krüger	West Germany	DNF	
