= Athletics at the 1961 Summer Universiade – Men's 800 metres =

The men's 800 metres event at the 1961 Summer Universiade was held at the Vasil Levski National Stadium in Sofia, Bulgaria, in September 1961.

== Medalists ==
Gold	Silver	Bronze
Ron Delany; Ireland	Rudolf Klaban; Austria	Wolfgang Schöll; West Germany

== Results ==
=== Heats ===
Rank	Heat	Name	Nationality	Time	Notes
1	1	Ron Delany	Ireland	1:56.7	Q
2	1	Mike Fleet	Great Britain	1:56.8	Q
3	1	Luc Baeyens	Belgium	1:56.80	
5	1	Benito Tamiozzi	Italy	1:57.0	
1	2	Vasily Savinkov	Soviet Union	1:53.6	Q
2	2	Wolfgang Schöll	West Germany	1:53.6	Q
3	2	Evelio Planas	Cuba	1:53.9	Q
4	2	Mamoru Morimoto	Japan	1:54.5	
1	3	Zoltan Vamoș	Romania	2:00.9	Q
2	3	Norbert Haupert	Luxembourg	2:01.4	Q
3	3	Ahmet Akbaş	Turkey	2:01.7	Q
4	3	Volker Tulzer	Austria	1:57.0 (?)	
1	4	John Holt	Great Britain	1:56.0	Q
2	4	Josef Odložil	Czechoslovakia	1:56.0	Q
3	4	Ohenia Asara	Ghana	1:56.2	Q
4	4	Mladen Zabev	Bulgaria	1:56.3	
1	5	Özen Tuncel	Turkey	2:02.6	Q
2	5	Bruno Unseld	West Germany	2:02.6	Q
3	5	Milan Jílek	Czechoslovakia	2:02.6	Q
4	5	Hossein Ahmad Mir-Nezami	Iran	2:09.7	
1	6	Per Knuts	Sweden	1:56.5	Q
2	6	Rudolf Klaban	Austria	1:56.9	Q
3	6	Georgi Zapundzhiev	Bulgaria	1:57.0	Q
4	6	Sokol Morina	Albania	1:57.4	

=== Semifinals ===
Rank	Heat	Name	Nationality	Time	Notes
1	1	Zoltan Vamoș	Romania	1:49.3	Q
2	1	Mike Fleet	Great Britain	1:49.5	Q
3	1	Vasily Savinkov	Soviet Union	1:49.5	
4	1	Per Knuts	Sweden	1:50.0	
5	1	Bruno Unseld	West Germany	1:52.4	
6	1	Ohenia Asara	Ghana	1:54.1	
1	2	Ron Delany	Ireland	1:50.7	Q
2	2	Rudolf Klaban	Austria	1:50.8	Q
3	2	Norbert Haupert	Luxembourg	1:51.6	
4	2	Josef Odložil	Czechoslovakia	1:51.7	
5	2	Evelio Planas	Cuba	1:54.7	
6	2	Özen Tuncel	Turkey	2:00.2	
1	3	Milan Jílek	Czechoslovakia	1:51.6	Q
2	3	Wolfgang Schöll	West Germany	1:51.9	Q
3	3	Volker Tulzer	Austria	1:52.3	
4	3	John Holt	Great Britain	1:53.4	
5	3	Georgi Zapundzhiev	Bulgaria	1:55.4	
6	3	Ahmet Akbaş	Turkey	1:58.5	

=== Final ===
Rank	Athlete	Nationality	Time	Notes
1st place, gold medalist(s)	Ron Delany	Ireland	1:51.1	
2nd place, silver medalist(s)	Rudolf Klaban	Austria	1:51.4	
3rd place, bronze medalist(s)	Wolfgang Schöll	West Germany	1:51.6	
4	Milan Jílek	Czechoslovakia	1:51.9	
5	Mike Fleet	Great Britain	1:52.1	
6	Zoltan Vamoș	Romania	2:10.7	
