= 1969 European Athletics Championships – Men's 800 metres =

Men's 800 metres at the European Athletics Championships

The men's 800 metres at the 1969 European Athletics Championships was held in Athens, Greece, at Georgios Karaiskakis Stadium on 17, 18, and 19 September 1969.

== Medalists ==
Gold	Dieter Fromm; East Germany
Silver	Jozef Plachý; Czechoslovakia
Bronze	Manfred Matuschewski; East Germany

== Results ==
=== Final ===
19 September

Rank	Name	Nationality	Time	Notes
1st place, gold medalist(s)	Dieter Fromm	East Germany	1:45.98	CR
2nd place, silver medalist(s)	Jozef Plachý	Czechoslovakia	1:46.26	
3rd place, bronze medalist(s)	Manfred Matuschewski	East Germany	1:46.83	
4	Yevgeniy Arzhanov	Soviet Union	1:47.1	
5	Hansueli Mumenthaler	Switzerland	1:47.2	
6	Andrzej Kupczyk	Poland	1:47.5	
7	Noel Carroll	Ireland	1:49.1	
8	Erhard Schulze	East Germany	1:55.4	

=== Semi-finals ===
18 September

==== Semi-final 1 ====
Rank	Name	Nationality	Time	Notes
1	Yevgeniy Arzhanov	Soviet Union	1:49.2	Q
2	Erhard Schulze	East Germany	1:49.4	Q
3	Manfred Matuschewski	East Germany	1:49.4	Q
4	Noel Carroll	Ireland	1:49.5	Q
5	Andy Carter	Great Britain	1:49.6	
6	Jože Međimurec	Yugoslavia	1:49.6	
7	Stanisław Waśkiewicz	Poland	1:49.6	
8	Tomáš Jungwirth	Czechoslovakia	1:50.0	

==== Semi-final 2 ====
Rank	Name	Nationality	Time	Notes
1	Jozef Plachý	Czechoslovakia	1:48.9	Q
2	Dieter Fromm	East Germany	1:49.0	Q
3	Hansueli Mumenthaler	Switzerland	1:49.1	Q
4	Andrzej Kupczyk	Poland	1:49.2	Q
5	Dave Cropper	Great Britain	1:50.0	
6	Bob Adams	Great Britain	1:50.9	
7	Sergey Kryuchok	Soviet Union	1:53.3	
8	Kazimierz Wardak	Poland	1:57.1	

=== Heats ===
17 September

==== Heat 1 ====
Rank	Name	Nationality	Time	Notes
1	Erhard Schulze	East Germany	1:48.7	Q
2	Bob Adams	Great Britain	1:49.2	Q
3	Jozef Plachý	Czechoslovakia	1:49.8	Q
4	Stanisław Waśkiewicz	Poland	1:50.4	Q
5	Jože Međimurec	Yugoslavia	1:50.5	Q
6	Zlatko Valchev	Bulgaria	1:50.6	

==== Heat 2 ====
Rank	Name	Nationality	Time	Notes
1	Andrzej Kupczyk	Poland	1:50.5	Q
2	Dave Cropper	Great Britain	1:50.8	Q
3	Manfred Matuschewski	East Germany	1:50.9	Q
4	Yevgeniy Arzhanov	Soviet Union	1:51.0	Q
5	Tomáš Jungwirth	Czechoslovakia	1:51.0	Q
6	Knut Brustad	Norway	1:51.1	
7	Rudi Simon	Belgium	1:51.1	
8	Ali Erte	Turkey	1:53.5	

==== Heat 3 ====
Rank	Name	Nationality	Time	Notes
1	Dieter Fromm	East Germany	1:50.1	Q
2	Hansueli Mumenthaler	Switzerland	1:50.1	Q
3	Noel Carroll	Ireland	1:50.2	Q
4	Andy Carter	Great Britain	1:50.3	Q
5	Kazimierz Wardak	Poland	1:50.3	Q
6	Sergey Kryuchok	Soviet Union	1:50.3	Q
7	Michel Medinger	Luxembourg	1:50.8	

== Participation ==
According to an unofficial count, 21 athletes from 13 countries participated in the event.

- Belgium (1)
- Bulgaria (1)
- Czechoslovakia (2)
- East Germany (3)
- Ireland (1)
- Luxembourg (1)
- Norway (1)
- Poland (3)
- Soviet Union (2)
- Switzerland (1)
- Turkey (1)
- Great Britain (3)
- Yugoslavia (1)
