= Brian Hewson =

British middle-distance runner (1933–2022)

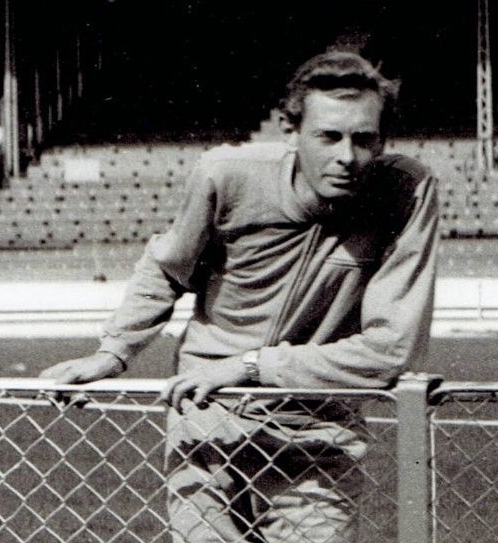
- Hewson at a dog race in 1959

Personal information
- Nationality: British (English)
- Born: 4 April 1933 Croydon, Surrey, England
- Died: 13 September 2022 (aged 89) South Africa
- Height: 183 cm (6 ft 0 in)
- Weight: 63 kg (139 lb)

Sport
- Sport: Athletics
- Events: 800 m, 1500 m
- Club: Mitcham AC

Achievements and titles
- Personal bests: 800 m – 1:47.0 (1958); 1500 m – 3:41.1 (1958)
Medal record
Men's athletics
Representing Great Britain
European Championships
Gold medal – first place	1958 Stockholm	1500 metres
Representing England
Commonwealth Games
Silver medal – second place	1954 Vancouver	880 yards
Silver medal – second place	1958 Cardiff	880 yards

Brian Stanford Hewson (4 April 1933 – 13 September 2022) was a middle-distance runner who represented Great Britain at the 1956 and 1960 Olympics. He won the gold medal in the 1500 metres at the 1958 European Championships.

Hewson was one of the first men to run a four-minute mile, clocking 3:59.8 at the White City Stadium in London on 28 May 1955. As he placed third to László Tábori and Chris Chataway, he became the first to run a mile in less than four minutes and not finish in the top two; before that race, only Roger Bannister and John Landy had run a four-minute mile.

== Early life and education ==
Hewson was born in Croydon, Surrey. He went to Pollards Hill Junior School, Pollards Hill, London and continued his education at Mitcham Grammar School, Mitcham, London, followed by aged 16 learning every aspect of tailoring at the Regent Street Polytechnic, London.

== Athletics career ==
=== Early running career ===
Hewson started running whilst attending Mitcham Grammar School. In 1947 he began to run quarter miles and won the Mitcham Schools Championship. Cecil Dale of Mitcham Athletics Club saw this win and as a result awarded Hewson a scholarship to Mitcham A.C.. He was then introduced to Frank Drew one of the club's coaches who then became Hewson's first coach. In his last year as a Youth he ran the 880 in 1:59.4. In his first year as a Junior he won the A.A.A. Junior 880 title in a record time of 1:55.3.

Hewson became the British 880 yards champion after winning the British AAA Championships title at the 1953 AAA Championships and successfully defended the title the following year at the 1954 AAA Championships. He represented the English team at the 1954 British Empire and Commonwealth Games held in Vancouver, Canada, where he won the silver medal in the 880 yards event.

=== Sub-4-minute mile ===
Sadly in April 1955 Hewson's coach Frank Drew died. He was then introduced to Austrian coach Franz Stampfl who was already coaching Chris Chataway. At this time Hewson moved up to run the mile. Then on 28 May 1955, at the British Games Meeting in London, he became only the fourth = man in the world to run a four-minute mile, running 3:59.8 the same time achieved by Chris Chataway in this same race which was won by László Tábori in a time of 3:59.00, but where Hewson was placed third in the race.

A Sub-4 Minute Mile Register chronicles all of the sub 4-minute milers between 1954 - 2002.

=== 1956 Olympics Melbourne Australia ===
Hewson came second in his heat for the 1500 metres on 29 November in a time of 3:48.0. In the 1500 metres final Hewson was leading in the final straight, only to be then passed by four men. The race was won by Ron Delany in a time of 3:41.2. Hewson came fifth in a time of 3:42.6.

=== 1958 ===
1958 was Hewson's best season, in addition to winning a gold medal in the European Games, he also produced his best times over the half mile and the mile and their metric equivalent times, which when added to his record performances of previous years made him the fastest-ever Englishman over 880 yards, running a personal best in 1958 of 1:47.0, 1000 metres, 1000 yards and 1500 metres running a personal best in 3:41.1, whilst only Derek Johnson had run faster over 800 metres and Roger Bannister and Derek Ibbotson had run faster over the mile.

Hewson won a gold medal in the Men's 1500 metres at The European Championships in Stockholm on 24 August 1958 in a time of 3:41.9. He also regained his AAA title at the 1958 AAA Championships and won a fourth AAA title at the 1959 AAA Championships.

=== 1960 Olympics Rome Italy ===
Hewson damaged a calf muscle six weeks before the Rome Olympics and so selectors insisted he run the 800 metres. In his qualifying heat he led for 700 metres before being passed by three runners, meaning that he came fourth and so was eliminated from the 800 metres final.

== Career ==
Having retired from athletics after the Rome Olympics, Hewson continued working at Simpson's of Piccadilly, London as a tailor, before setting up his own tailoring company in the East End of London. Clothing, sport, fashion and retailing were to shape his working career, where he became women's fashion buyer for English Lady and subsequently sportwear and sporting goods buyer for Debenhams. He then joined the Incentive Group where he was involved in the design and manufacture of corporate uniforms for major UK multi-national companies.

== Personal life ==
Hewson married Roberta E. "Bobby" Bassford in 1957, but the marriage was annulled on the grounds that she had refused to consummate the marriage. He married Alison Blaiklock, a secretary, in 1963; the couple had three children, James, Caroline and Charles. They divorced in 1980 and Hewson was remarried to Marion Stiff and had four stepchildren Tim, Sally, Robert and Penny.

Hewson died on 13 September 2022, at the age of 89.

== Publications ==
=== Autobiography ===
- Flying Feet. Stanley Paul & Co Ltd. 1962.
