= 1958 European Athletics Championships – Men's 800 metres =

Men's 800 metres at the European Athletics Championships

The men's 800 metres at the 1958 European Athletics Championships was held in Stockholm, Sweden, at Stockholms Olympiastadion on 19, 20, and 21 August 1958.

== Medalists ==
Gold	Mike Rawson; Great Britain
Silver	Audun Boysen; Norway
Bronze	Paul Schmidt; West Germany

== Results ==
=== Final ===
21 August

Rank	Name	Nationality	Time	Notes
1st place, gold medalist(s)	Mike Rawson	Great Britain	1:47.8	
2nd place, silver medalist(s)	Audun Boysen	Norway	1:47.9	
3rd place, bronze medalist(s)	Paul Schmidt	West Germany	1:47.9	
4	Zbigniew Makomaski	Poland	1:48.0	
5	Lajos Szentgáli	Hungary	1:48.3	
6	Herbert Missalla	West Germany	1:48.5	
7	Derek Johnson	Great Britain	1:49.2	
8	Christian Wägli	Switzerland	1:52.0	

=== Semi-finals ===
20 August

==== Semi-final 1 ====
Rank	Name	Nationality	Time	Notes
1	Derek Johnson	Great Britain	1:48.8	Q
2	Christian Wägli	Switzerland	1:49.0	Q
3	Zbigniew Makomaski	Poland	1:49.1	Q
4	Herbert Missalla	West Germany	1:49.2	Q
5	Lajos Kovács	Hungary	1:49.2	
6	Olavi Salonen	Finland	1:51.8	
7	Svavar Markússon	Iceland	1:54.6	
8	Hendrik Haus	Netherlands	1:59.0	

==== Semi-final 2 ====
Rank	Name	Nationality	Time	Notes
1	Paul Schmidt	West Germany	1:49.5	Q
2	Lajos Szentgáli	Hungary	1:49.8	Q
3	Audun Boysen	Norway	1:49.9	Q
4	Mike Rawson	Great Britain	1:50.1	Q
5	Evangelos Depastas	Greece	1:50.3	
6	Gianfranco Baraldi	Italy	1:51.2	
7	Rolf Gottfridsson	Sweden	1:52.1	
	Tadeusz Kaźmierski	Poland	DQ	

=== Heats ===
19 August

==== Heat 1 ====
Rank	Name	Nationality	Time	Notes
1	Derek Johnson	Great Britain	1:49.5	Q
2	Lajos Szentgáli	Hungary	1:50.0	Q
3	Svavar Markússon	Iceland	1:50.5	NR Q
4	Hendrik Haus	Netherlands	1:51.0	Q
5	Cesáreo Marín	Spain	1:52.8	

==== Heat 2 ====
Rank	Name	Nationality	Time	Notes
1	Mike Rawson	Great Britain	1:50.4	Q
2	Evangelos Depastas	Greece	1:50.7	Q
3	Olavi Salonen	Finland	1:50.7	Q
4	Zbigniew Makomaski	Poland	1:51.2	Q
5	Gérard Vervoort	France	1:51.6	
6	Hendrik Heida	Netherlands	1:52.3	

==== Heat 3 ====
Rank	Name	Nationality	Time	Notes
1	Herbert Missalla	West Germany	1:50.0	Q
2	Audun Boysen	Norway	1:50.5	Q
3	Christian Wägli	Switzerland	1:50.6	Q
4	Tadeusz Kaźmierski	Poland	1:50.8	Q
5	Dimitrios Konstantinidis	Greece	1:50.9	
6	Rudolf Klaban	Austria	1:51.3	

==== Heat 4 ====
Rank	Name	Nationality	Time	Notes
1	Paul Schmidt	West Germany	1:51.4	Q
2	Gianfranco Baraldi	Italy	1:51.8	Q
3	Lajos Kovács	Hungary	1:52.0	Q
4	Rolf Gottfridsson	Sweden	1:52.0	Q
5	Čeněk Hanka	Czechoslovakia	1:52.1	
6	Robert Misplon	France	1:54.3	

== Participation ==
According to an unofficial count, 23 athletes from 16 countries participated in the event.

- Austria (1)
- Czechoslovakia (1)
- Finland (1)
- France (2)
- Greece (2)
- Hungary (2)
- Iceland (1)
- Italy (1)
- Netherlands (2)
- Norway (1)
- Poland (2)
- Spain (1)
- Sweden (1)
- Switzerland (1)
- Great Britain (2)
- West Germany (2)
