= Alan Dean =

Alan Dean may refer to:

- Alan Dean (athlete) (born 1940), British Olympic athlete
- Alan Dean (cricketer) (born 1962), English cricketer
- Alan Dean (ornithologist), British ornithologist
- Alan Dean (priest) (born 1938), Archdeacon of the Army
