= Hassan Dyamwale =

Tanzanian middle-distance runner

Personal information
- Nationality: Tanzanian
- Born: 1 June 1941
- Died: 13 August 2017 (aged 76) Dar es Salaam, Tanzania

Sport
- Sport: Middle-distance running
- Event: 800 metres

Mohamed Hassan Chabanga Dyamwale (1 June 1941 – 13 August 2017) was a Tanzanian middle-distance runner, sports executive, and politician. He competed in the men's 800 metres at the 1964 Summer Olympics. Dyamwale founded the Tanzanian Premier League, and served as the president of the Tanzania Football Federation in the 1970s. Dyamwale later moved into politics and served as a Deputy Minister of Natural Resources and Tourism. In the 1980s, Dyamwale created a program for free children's playgrounds. Dyamwale died in Muhimbili National Hospital, Dar es Salaam in August 2017.
