= Uniszki Zawadzkie =

- Village
- Location within Poland
- Coordinates: 53°10′N 20°26′E
- Country: Poland
- Voivodeship: Masovian
- County: Mława
- Gmina: Wieczfnia Kościelna
- Population: 450

Uniszki Zawadzkie [uˈniʂki zaˈvat͡skʲɛ] is a village in the administrative district of Gmina Wieczfnia Kościelna, within Mława County, Masovian Voivodeship, in east-central Poland.

== Notable people ==
- Zbigniew Makomaski (b. 1931) – Polish runner, Olympian
