= Yevgeny Momotkov =

Soviet athlete

Personal information
- Nationality: Soviet
- Born: 20 October 1935 (age 90)

Sport
- Sport: Middle-distance running
- Event: 1500 metres

Yevgeny Momotkov (born 20 October 1935) is a Soviet middle-distance runner. He competed in the men's 1500 metres at the 1960 Summer Olympics.
