= Zbigniew Makomaski =

Polish middle-distance runner

Personal information
- Full name: Zbigniew Antoni Makomaski
- Nationality: Polish
- Born: 11 July 1931 (age 95) Uniszki Zawadzkie, Poland
- Height: 1.77 m (5 ft 10 in)
- Weight: 70 kg (154 lb)

Sport
- Sport: Middle-distance running
- Event: 800 metres
- Club: Spójnia Warsaw

Zbigniew Antoni Makomaski (born 11 July 1931) is a retired Polish middle-distance runner. He competed in the men's 800 metres at the 1960 Summer Olympics.

== International competitions ==
Year	Competition	Venue	Position	Event	Notes
Representing Poland
1954	World Student Games	Budapest, Hungary	2nd	4 × 400 m relay	3:14.6
1955	World Festival of Youth and Students	Warsaw, Poland	2nd	400 m	47.9
1955	World Festival of Youth and Students	Warsaw, Poland	2nd	4 × 400 m relay	3:11.8
1958	European Championships	Stockholm, Sweden	4th	800 m	1:48.0
1958	European Championships	Stockholm, Sweden	6th	4 × 400 m relay	3:13.8
1960	Olympic Games	Rome, Italy	20th (qf)	800 m	1:51.72

== Personal bests ==
- 400 metres – 47.3h (Budapest 1957)
- 800 metres – 1:46.7h (Warsaw 1958)
- 1000 metres – 2:23.3h (Warsaw 1960)
- 400 metres hurdles – 55.0h (Jena 1953)
