= Borut Ingolič =

Yugoslav middle-distance runner

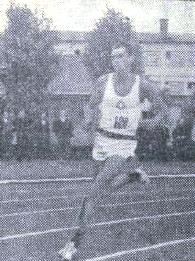

Personal information
- Nationality: Yugoslav
- Born: 2 July 1939 (age 87)

Sport
- Sport: Middle-distance running
- Event: 800 metres

Borut Ingolič (born 2 July 1939) is a Yugoslav middle-distance runner. He competed in the men's 800 metres at the 1960 Summer Olympics.
