= Franz-Josef Kemper =

German athlete, Olympian, and official (born 1945)

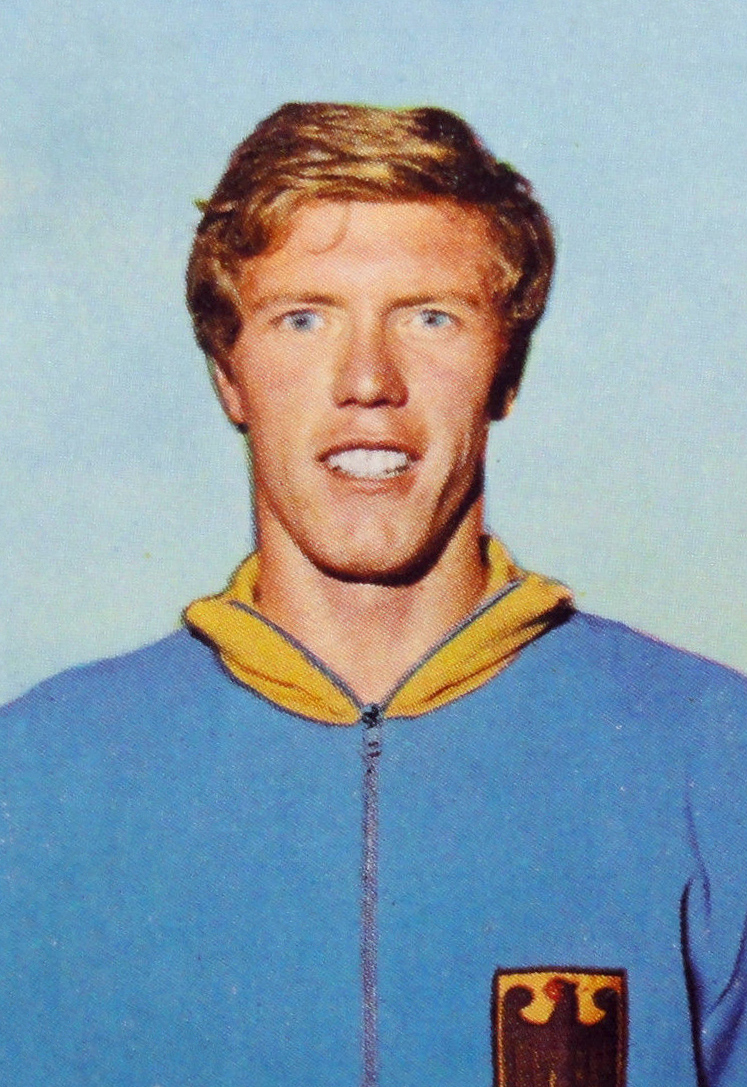
- Franz-Josef Kemper c. 1968

Personal information
- Born: 30 September 1945 (age 80) Hopsten, Germany
- Height: 1.80 m (5 ft 11 in)
- Weight: 61 kg (134 lb)

Sport
- Sport: Athletics
- Event: 400–3000 m
- Club: SC Preußen Münster; LG Ratio Münster

Achievements and titles
- Personal best(s): 400 m – 47.1 (1967); 800 m – 1:44.9 (1966); 1000 m – 2:16.2 (1966); 1500 m – 3:41.7 (1970); 3000 m – 8:37.8 (1973)
Medal record
Men's athletics
Representing West Germany
European Championships
Silver medal – second place	1966 Budapest	800 m
European Indoor Championships
Gold medal – first place	1972 Grenoble	4×720 m
Summer Universiade
Gold medal – first place	1970 Turin	800m
Silver medal – second place	1967 Tokyo	800m

Franz-Josef Kemper (born 30 September 1945) is a German athlete, Olympian, and official. He achieved his greatest success as a middle-distance runner in the 1960s and 1970s.

== Sports career ==
Kemper won five German outdoor titles in the 800 metres, in 1965, 1966, 1967, 1970 and 1971. In 1966, he set a new European 800 metres record as well as world records in the 1000 metres and the 4 × 800 metres relay. He took part in the 1968 Summer Olympics in Mexico City, and finished fourth in the 800 metres at the 1972 Summer Olympics in Munich.

In 1967, Kemper was awarded the Silberne Lorbeerblatt, the highest German athletics award.

== Official career ==
Kemper studied sports, and German language and literature, at the University of Münster and sociology at the Technische Hochschule Darmstadt. At the TH Darmstadt, he received a Doctor of Philosophy in 1980.

Since the year 2000, Kemper has been the assistant director and director of the sports department and holds an honorary position in the Ministry of the Interior and Sport in Rhineland Palatinate. In March 2003, he was appointed by the council of ministers of the federal states as the national delegate to the 2006 FIFA World Cup. He has held this office since 15 April 2004.

In 1989 Kemper married Sylvia Schenk, a jurist and former Olympic 800 m runner.

== Honorary appointments ==
- 1989–1993: Kemper belonged to the Presidium of the Deutschen Leichtathletik-Verbandes (DLV).
- 1989–1998: A member of the Federal Board on Popular Sports in the Deutschen Sportbund (DSB).
- 1995–1998: Chairman of the Working Group on "Sports in Health" of the DSB.

Records
Preceded by (Belgium) Roger Moens	European Record Holder Men's 800 m 7 August 1966 – 15 July 1970	Succeeded by (West Germany) Walter Adams
