= Mike Rawson =

British athlete (1934–2000)

Personal information
- Nationality: British (English)
- Born: 26 May 1934 Hall Green, Birmingham, England
- Died: 26 October 2000 (aged 66) Birmingham, England
- Height: 178 cm (5 ft 10 in)
- Weight: 72 kg (159 lb)

Sport
- Sport: Athletics
- Event: middle-distance
- Club: Birchfield Harriers
Medal record
Men's athletics
Representing Great Britain
European Championships
Gold medal – first place	1958 Stockholm	800 metres
Representing England
Commonwealth Games
Bronze medal – third place	1958 Cardiff	880 yards

Michael Arthur Rawson (26 May 1934 – 26 October 2000) was an English track and field athlete who competed at the 1956 Summer Olympics.

== Biography ==
Rwason became the British 880 yards champion after winning the British AAA Championships title at the 1956 AAA Championships.

Later that year he represented Great Britain at the 1956 Olympic Games in Melbourne, participating in the men's 800 metres competition.

Two years later he won a gold medal at the 1958 European Championships in Stockholm, Sweden. He represented the England athletics team and won a bronze medal in the 880 yards at the 1958 British Empire and Commonwealth Games in Cardiff, Wales.

He represented Birchfield Harriers and on his retirement from the sport spent many years coaching at Birchfield and working as an athletics reporter for the BBC and local newspapers.

Rawson worked for the British Olympic Association at a number of Olympic Games. He died after a short illness on 26 October 2000 in Birmingham.
