= Franz Stampfl =

Austrian-born British/Australian athletics coach (1913–1995)

Franz Ferdinand Leopold Stampfl MBE (born Vienna 18 November 1913 – died 19 March 1995 Melbourne) was one of the world's leading athletics coaches in the twentieth century. He pioneered a scientific system of Interval Training which became very popular with sprint and middle distance athletes. His most striking success was the world's first sub-four minute mile by Roger Bannister in 1954. Stampfl was posthumously awarded the World Athletics Heritage Plaque as a "legendary and pioneering coach" on 26 September 2019.

== Early life ==
Stampfl was born in the capital of then Austro-Hungarian Empire, fourth of seven children. His father, Josef Stampfl ran a small company manufacturing surgical instruments. His mother's maiden name was Karoline Katharina Yusupov or Karolina Katerina Josepow. She was supposed to be the illegitimate child of a member of the House of Yusupov, but this could never be proven. He studied writing and painting in school. After high school, he attended the Vienna Kunstgewerbeschule and had some success as a skier and javelin thrower.

In 1937 sensing the rise of Adolf Hitler and having been banned after refusing to obey instructions from Austrian Olympic officials, he left Austria for England to study at the Chelsea School of Art. When Hitler marched into Austria in 1938, the British government demanded that he leave the country unless he showed a unique and necessary skill. Having taught skiing back in his homeland, Stampfl pitched AAA officials to coach their athletes, earning him a job in Northern Ireland. This was in part due to assistance by Olympic athlete Harold Abrahams.

== Second World War: internment and shipment to Australia ==
During World War II Stampfl taught physical education at Queen Elizabeth's Grammar School, Barnet (then holders of the Public Schools Challenge Cup for athletics) from February to June 1940, when he was suddenly interned as an enemy alien. He was transported to Canada and then Australia. He went on hunger strike to protest at his confinement.

=== Attack on the Arandora Star ===
Early one July morning in 1940, Stampfl was on his way to Canada on the liner ship SS Arandora Star with a host of other prisoners of war. Off the northwest coast of Ireland, a German U-boat torpedoed the ship; and within thirty minutes amid screams of fear, the ship was flooded with water and sunk to the bottom of the Atlantic. To survive, Stampfl forced a steel plate aside to get to the surface and then jumped into the freezing cold, oil-slicked sea. For eight hours he swam, warding off shock from the cold and struggling to keep his head above the water, before a rescue boat sighted him.

The Headmaster of Queen Elizabeth's, Ernest Jenkins, later observed that, under the relevant order, even friendly Germans and Austrians were arrested. He gave the date of Stampfl's detention as 2 July 1940, but, as this was the day that the Arandora Star was attacked, it was probably slightly earlier. The decision to arrest aliens was taken on 18 June 1940. Stampfl was one of 868 survivors when the Arandora Star, carrying 1,190 deportees, was torpedoed en route to Canada. Among those who lost their lives were the former Italian head chefs of London's Savoy and Ritz Hotels.

Hundreds died in the disaster, but those who survived were shipped back to Britain, interned and shipped once again to Australia on the HMT Dunera. There, Stampfl was sent to internment camps in Hay and Tatura, where he stayed from 7 September 1940 to 28 January 1942. To ease the desperation plaguing the prisoners he organised athletics, boxing, wrestling and football matches. 'It was not just a job for me,' he said. 'It was an inner desire to survive and remain sane for myself and my friends in camp.' From 8 April 1942 to 15 January 1946 he served in the 8th Australian Employment Company of the Australian Army.

== Post-war ==
After the war has ended, Stampfl decided to return to Britain to continue athletics coaching in 1946. Although he suffered terribly over the previous years and had trouble sleeping under linen or far from an open window because of his long confinement, he still admired the English for their love of amateur sport, and felt their athletes could use his help. He reconnected with amateur officials and arranged for a coaching post in Northern Ireland from 1946 to 1951. In 1947 he married Patricia, née Cussen, an Australian whom he had met in Melbourne, at a ceremony in Belfast. They moved to London in 1951 where he worked as a sales assistant at the sports wear company Lillywhites. He established a training base at the Duke of York's Barracks and had part-time coaching posts at Cambridge and Oxford Universities. Still he was not asked to aid the British Olympic team in 1952 – evidence that amateur officials never brought him fully into their fold because he was an outsider.

In 1952 the John Fisher School (Purley) won the Public Schools Challenge Cup for athletics, held at the White City Stadium. Smaller than most of the 203 top schools that entered the competition that year, John Fisher's victory caused controversy. Previously, schools entered only a limited number of individual athletes and therefore scored few points. However, thanks to the determination of Fr. McLean and the school's athletics coach, Herr Franz Stampfl, John Fisher entered a full athletics squad who outscored every school, across the full range of track and field disciplines, to win the trophy by the widest ever winning margin. There was much debate about the ethics of one school 'sweeping the board' in such a manner. In 1953 the feat was repeated, this time by an even greater winning margin – and again the opposition cried "foul". The following year the championship took place and yet again John Fisher boys out-performed the opposition. However, the organisers decided to withdraw the Challenge Cup and only reward individual performances. The school was therefore denied a hat-trick of wins. Franz Stampfl, who worked at John Fisher school as athletics coach from 1950 to 1955, emigrated to Australia, training the Australian Squad in preparation for the Melbourne Olympic Games. Of particular note is that he coached Sir Roger Bannister, the first man to break the four-minute mile in May 1954. Franz Stampfl gained a reputation as one of the world's leading athletics coaches and, under his guidance, for a few years in the early 1950s John Fisher School was to dominate schoolboy athletics.

== The Four-Minute Mile ==
Stampfl's coaching assisted Roger Bannister to the world's first sub four-minute mile at Oxford on 6 May 1954. Chris Chataway and Chris Brasher, who played key roles in pacing Bannister to the record, were also coached by Stampfl and his methods were adopted by, among others, the tennis player Ashley Cooper and the boxer Don Cockell who took Rocky Marciano to nine rounds in their heavyweight title fight in 1955. A humble man, the Austrian coach had ignored the hype after Bannister's Iffley Road triumph, preferring to slip away quietly and get back to London to train other athletes. He didn't need to stand around and have his picture taken by Bannister's side nor claim that the four-minute mile had been achieved through strict adherence to his coaching. The only satisfaction Stampfl got from the publicity was the knowledge that it would encourage more athletes to train with him.

Stampfl's book, Franz Stampfl on Running, first published in 1955, was a great success and rated by The Times as an "admirable and enthralling text-book on training and tactics".

== Australian Successes ==
In 1955, Stampfl was invited to Australia to become director of athletics at Melbourne University and he settled in Melbourne until his death.

At the 1956 Olympic Games in Melbourne, Stampfl coached 11 of the athletes in the Australian team.

He trained many successful Australian athletes during his lifetime; most notably:

- Bev Francis - World Powerlifting Champion
- Gael Martin – 1984 Olympic Bronze Medal shot put
- Ralph Doubell – 1968 Olympic Gold Medal 800 metres – World Record

Other Stampfl athletes included Olympic finalists Tony Sneazwell, Alan Crawley and Merv Lincoln, in addition to Commonwealth champions Peter Bourke, Sue Howland and Judy Peckham.

== Interval Training ==
Stampfl was a great proponent of the interval style of training where athletes run high-intensity distance trials followed by short recovery periods. An example could be 12 repetitions of 400 metres with a 200-metre jog between each.

Stampfl had a great rivalry with Percy Cerutty who coached the middle-distance running champion Herb Elliott. Stampfl's coaching was regarded as 'scientific' whereas Cerutty's techniques were considered more 'natural', based on 'Stotan' (a mixture of Stoic and Spartan) philosophies. As such, they – and their athletes – were seen as obvious rivals.

== Quadriplegia ==
Stampfl was involved in a car accident in 1980, his sports car being hit from behind while stationary at a traffic light, and was left a quadriplegic. Despite this, he continued to coach.

In the 1981 Birthday Honours, he was appointed a Member of the Most Excellent Order of the British Empire (MBE) for services to athletics.

== Quotes ==
- "The possibilities in racing tactics are almost unlimited, as in a game of chess; for every move there is a counter, for every attack there is a defence... The runner's greatest asset, apart from essential fitness of body, is a cool and calculating brain allied to confidence and courage. Above all, he must have a will to win".
- "Running is an art, and every runner must be thought of as an artist."
- "If you forego this chance, would you ever forgive yourself?" - Franz Stampfl to Roger Bannister hours before the first sub-four minute mile.
- "My ideal athlete would have the mind of a poet. He would be a man with rich imagination, capable of feeling physical, mental and spiritual emotions intensely."
- "He must be a fanatic for hard work and enthusiastic enough to enjoy it. He must be ready to go beyond the point at which he feels he is going to die."
