= Zbigniew Orywał =

Polish middle-distance runner

Personal information
- Nationality: Polish
- Born: 5 April 1930 (age 96) Kępno, Poland
- Height: 1.76 m (5 ft 9 in)
- Weight: 70 kg (154 lb)

Sport
- Sport: Middle-distance running
- Event: 800 metres
- Club: Olimpia Poznań

Zbigniew "Biggy" Orywał (born 5 April 1930) is a Polish middle-distance runner. He competed in the men's 800 metres at the 1960 Summer Olympics.

== International competitions ==
Year	Competition	Venue	Position	Event	Notes
Representing Poland
1958	European Championships	Stockholm, Sweden	7th	1500 m	3:43.7
1960	Olympic Games	Rome, Italy	45th (h)	800 m	1:55.89
1960	Olympic Games	Rome, Italy	– (h)	1500 m	DNF

== Personal bests ==
- 800 metres – 1:48.1h (Warsaw 1961)
- 1000 metres – 2:18.8h (Turku 1958)
- 1500 metres – 3:42.0h (Turku 1958)
- 400 metres hurdles – 53.6h (Warsaw 1957)
