= Adolf Schwarte =

German middle-distance runner

Personal information
- Nationality: German
- Born: 28 January 1935 (age 91)

Sport
- Sport: Middle-distance running
- Event: 1500 metres

Adolf Schwarte (born 28 January 1935) is a German middle-distance runner. He competed in the men's 1500 metres at the 1960 Summer Olympics.
