= Merv Lincoln =

Australian middle-distance runner

Medal record

Men's athletics

Representing Australia

Commonwealth Games
Silver medal – second place	Cardiff 1958	One mile

Mervyn George Lincoln (22 November 1933 – 1 May 2016) was an Australian middle-distance runner who won a silver medal in the mile run at the 1958 British Empire and Commonwealth Games and twice competed in the Summer Olympic Games.

== Career ==
Merv Lincoln was born in Leongatha, Victoria and raised in Wodonga, where for many years in his honour there has been a Lincoln Causeway adjacent to the Hume Freeway.

He qualified for the 1500 metres final at the 1956 Summer Olympics in Melbourne, finishing 12th. He was tipped as a potential successor to the retiring John Landy as Australia's leading miler; however, newcomer Herb Elliott defeated him at the 1957 national championships.

Lincoln ran his first four-minute mile on 23 March 1957, the eleventh man in the world and the third Australian to accomplish that feat. His time of 3:58.9 was less than a second short of Landy's world record of 3:58.0. Despite his loss to Elliott at the Australian championships he did also win a national championship mile that year, winning the United States championship race as an outside competitor. Track & Field News ranked him #7 in the world for 1957, one place below his Australian rival Elliott.

Lincoln reached his peak in 1958 but was overshadowed by the rapidly improving Elliott. The Australian team of Elliott, Lincoln, and Albie Thomas swept the medals in the mile at the British Empire and Commonwealth Games in Cardiff, Lincoln running 4:01.80 for silver. He set his personal mile best of 3:55.9 in Dublin on 6 August 1958, finishing more than a second under Derek Ibbotson's world record of 3:57.2 yet still only being the runner-up as Elliott won in a new record time of 3:54.5. Track & Field News ranked Lincoln as second in the world that year; however, that proved to be the last time he was ranked among the world's top ten, and at the 1960 Olympics in Rome he failed to qualify from the heats.

He was coached by the Austrian-born Franz Stampfl, a bitter rival of Elliott's coach Percy Cerutty. Stampfl stated Lincoln only trained one hour a day, in contrast to the harder training of Elliott.

He died on 1 May 2016, aged 82.
