= Rolf Jelinek =

Swiss middle-distance runner

Personal information
- Nationality: Swiss
- Born: 28 August 1936 (age 89)

Sport
- Sport: Middle-distance running
- Events: 800 and 1,500 metres

Rolf Jelinek (born 28 August 1936) is a Swiss middle-distance runner. He competed in the men's 800 metres at the 1964 Summer Olympics.
