= Jörg Balke =

German middle-distance runner

Personal information
- Nationality: German
- Born: 23 March 1936 Berlin-Spandau, Nazi Germany
- Died: 5 March 2012 (aged 75) Unna, Germany

Sport
- Sport: Middle-distance running
- Event: 800 metres

Jörg Balke (23 March 1936 – 5 March 2012) was a German middle-distance runner. He competed in the men's 800 metres at the 1960 Summer Olympics.
