= Yair Pantilat =

Israeli former Olympic runner (born 1939)

Personal information
- Native name: יאיר פנטילט
- Citizenship: Israel
- Born: January 10, 1939
- Died: March 22, 2022 (aged 83)
- Height: 5 ft 9.5 in (177 cm)
- Weight: 150 lb (68 kg)

Sport
- Country: Israel
- Sport: Athletics
- Events: 800m; 1500m

Achievements and titles
- National finals: Israeli Champion in 800 metres (1960, 1964-65, and 1967-69), and in 1500 metres (1961-62 and 1964-66).
- Personal bests: 800 metres: 1:51.3 (1967); 1500 metres: 3:52.4 (1967)

Yair Pantilat (also, Pantillat; Hebrew: יאיר פנטילט; January 10, 1939 – March 23, 2022) was an Israeli Olympic runner. He was the Israeli Men's Champion in the 800 metres in 1960, 1964–65, and 1967–69, and in the 1500 metres in 1961-62 and 1964–66. He was born in Tel Aviv, Israel, and is Jewish.

== Running career ==
Pantilat's personal bests are 1:51.3 in the 800 metres (in 1967) and 3:52.4 in the 1500 metre run (in 1967). He was the Israeli Men's Champion in the 800 metres in 1960, 1964–65, and 1967–69, and in the 1500 metres in 1961-62 and 1964–66. He competed for Israel at the 1960 Summer Olympics in Rome, Italy, in Athletics at the age of 21. In the Men's 800 metres he came in 5th in Heat 1 with a time of 1:54.7 (an Israeli record), and in the Men's 1,500 metres he came in 12th in Heat 3 with a time of 3:59.8 (an Israeli record). When he competed in the Olympics, he was 5 ft 9.5 in (177 cm) tall, and weighed 150 lb (68 kg). He was named Israel's Sportsman of the Year in 1960.
