= Stefan Lewandowski =

Polish middle-distance runner

Personal information
- Nationality: Polish
- Born: 30 May 1930 Danzig, Free City of Danzig
- Died: 2 December 2007 (aged 77) Hamm
- Height: 1.80 m (5 ft 11 in)
- Weight: 61 kg (134 lb)

Sport
- Sport: Middle-distance running
- Event: 800 metres
- Club: AZS Szczecin; Czarni Szczecin

Stefan Lewandowski ( 30 May 1930 – 2 December 2007) was a Polish middle-distance runner. He competed in the men's 800 metres at the 1960 Summer Olympics. He was Two-time Olympian (Helsinki 1952, Rome 1960) and Polish doctor, orthopedic surgeon and athlete, called the 'flying doctor'.

== International competitions ==
Year	Competition	Venue	Position	Event	Notes
Representing Poland
1952	Olympic Games	Helsinki, Finland	40th (h)	1500 m	4:00.87
1953	World Festival of Youth and Students	Bucharest, Romania	4th	1500 m	3:49.2
1954	World Student Games	Budapest, Hungary	6th	800 m	1:52.3
1954	World Student Games	Budapest, Hungary	5th	1500 m	3:52.0
1955	World Festival of Youth and Students	Warsaw, Poland	4th	1500 m	3:45.0
1958	European Championships	Stockholm, Sweden	10th (h)	1500 m	3:43.2
1960	Olympic Games	Rome, Italy	26th (h)	800 m	1:51.75
1960	Olympic Games	Rome, Italy	33rd (h)	1500 m	3:59.75

== Personal bests ==
- 800 metres – 1:46.5h (Cologne 1959)
- 1000 metres – 2:19.0h (Gävle 1959)
- 1500 metres – 3:41.0h (Gothenburg 1959)
