= Svavar Markússon =

Icelandic middle-distance runner

Personal information
- Nationality: Icelandic
- Born: 30 May 1935 Olafsvík, Iceland
- Died: 28 October 1976 (aged 41) Reykjavik, Iceland
- Height: 1.86 m (6 ft 1 in)

Sport
- Sport: Middle-distance running
- Event: 800 metres

Svavar Markússon (30 May 1935 – 28 October 1976) was an Icelandic middle-distance runner.

He competed in the 800 and 1500 metres at the 1960 Summer Olympics. He also competed in the 800 and 1500 metres at the 1958 European Athletics Championships without reaching the final.

His personal best times were 1:50.5 minutes in the 800 metres, achieved in 1958; and 3:47.20 minutes in the 1500 metres, achieved in 1960.

Outside of sports, he was a banker.
