= Pertti Ålander =

Finnish middle-distance runner

Personal information
- Full name: Pertti Kalevi Fredrik Ålander
- Nationality: Finnish
- Born: 12 December 1936 (age 89) Helsinki, Finland

Sport
- Sport: Middle-distance running
- Event: 800 metres

Pertti Ålander (born 12 December 1936) is a Finnish middle-distance runner. He competed in the men's 800 metres at the 1960 Summer Olympics.
