= Brian Kent-Smith =

British middle-distance runner

Personal information
- Nationality: British (English)
- Born: 10 October 1935 (age 90) Barnstaple, Devon, England
- Height: 188 cm (6 ft 2 in)
- Weight: 83 kg (183 lb)

Sport
- Sport: Athletics
- Event: Middle-distance running
- Club: Devonport Athletic Club

Brian William Kent-Smith (born 10 October 1935) is a British middle-distance runner who competed at the 1960 Summer Olympics.

== Biography ==
Kent-Smith finished third behind Ken Wood in the 1 mile event at the 1959 AAA Championships.

At the 1960 Olympic Games in Rome, he represented Great Britain in the men's 1500 metres competition.
