= Dieter Bogatzki =

German middle-distance runner

Personal information
- Nationality: German
- Born: 25 January 1942 Chojnice, Poland
- Died: 5 December 2000 (aged 58)

Sport
- Sport: Middle-distance running
- Event: 800 metres

Dieter Bogatzki (25 January 1942 – 5 December 2000) was a German middle-distance runner. He competed in the men's 800 metres at the 1964 Summer Olympics.

Bogatzki was born in Chojnice in 1942, while the Polish town was under Nazi Germany occupation in World War II.
