= Pekka Juutilainen =

Finnish middle-distance runner

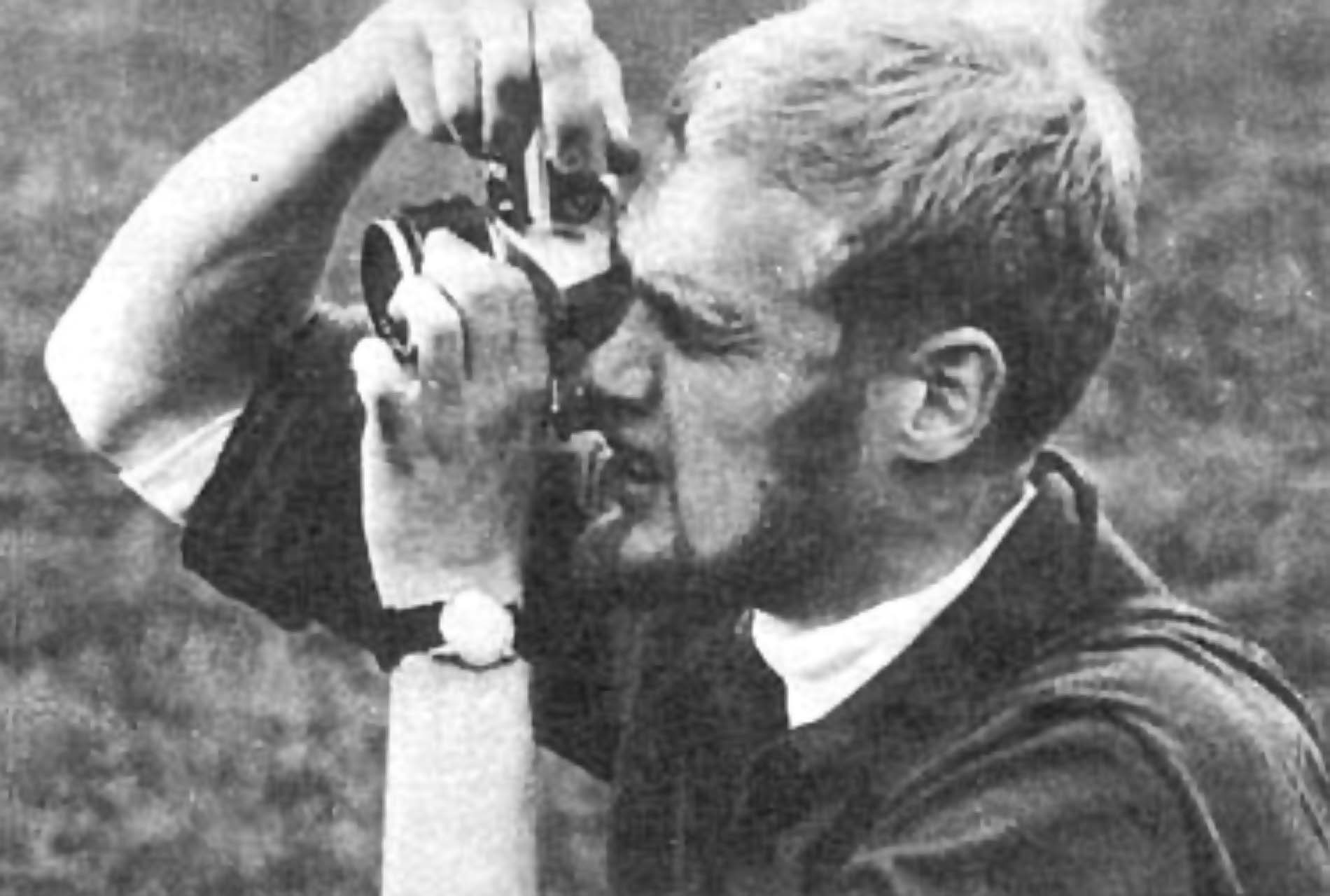

Personal information
- Nationality: Finnish
- Born: 3 December 1940 (age 85) Helsinki, Finland

Sport
- Sport: Middle-distance running
- Event: 800 metres

Pekka Juutilainen (born 3 December 1940) is a Finnish former middle-distance runner. He competed in the men's 800 metres at the 1964 Summer Olympics.
