= Derek McCleane =

Irish middle-distance runner

Personal information
- Nationality: Irish
- Born: 4 January 1938 (age 88) Ireland
- Height: 179 cm (5 ft 10 in)
- Weight: 68 kg (150 lb)

Sport
- Sport: Middle-distance running
- Event: 800 metres

Derek McCleane (born 4 January 1938) is an Irish middle-distance runner who competed at the 1964 Summer Olympics.

== Biography ==
McCleane finished second behind fellow Irishman Noel Carroll in the 880 yards event at the 1963 AAA Championships and third behind Bill Crothers at the 1964 AAA Championships.

At the 1964 Olympic Games in Tokyo, he represented Ireland in the men's 800 metres.
