= Chris Carter (runner) =

British middle-distance runner (born 1942)

Personal information
- Nationality: British (English)
- Born: 25 December 1942 (age 83) Steyning, Sussex, England
- Height: 185 cm (6 ft 1 in)
- Weight: 81 kg (179 lb)

Sport
- Sport: Middle-distance running
- Event: 800 metres
- Club: Brighton & Hove AC

Christopher Sydney Carter (born 25 December 1942) is a British middle-distance runner who competed at two Olympic Games.

== Biography ==
Carter competed in the 800 metres at the 1964 Summer Olympics.

Carter finished second behind Tom Farrell in the 880 yards event at the 1965 AAA Championships and second behind Noel Carroll at the 1966 AAA Championships. By virtue of being the highest placed British athlete at both he was considered the British 880 yards champion

He represented England in the 880 yards, at the 1966 British Empire and Commonwealth Games in Kingston, Jamaica.

He also competed in the 800 metres at the 1968 Summer Olympics. He was a member of the British quartet that broke the world record for the 4 x 800m world record in June 1966 with 7min 14.4sec. The record was not allowed on a technicality and was awarded to the USSR team who finished second in 7min 16.0secs.
