= Alan Dean (athlete) =

British middle-distance runner

Personal information
- Nationality: British
- Born: 26 January 1942 (age 84)

Sport
- Sport: Middle-distance running
- Event: 800 metres

Alan Dean (born 26 January 1942) is a British middle-distance runner. He competed in the men's 800 metres at the 1964 Summer Olympics. Alan first competed for England aged 21 in 1963 against Norway in Bergen, and also competed against Italy and Germany at White City in London. He also competed against Poland and other countries.

Alan joined the Michelin tyre company as a pre-apprentice aged 15 and became a full apprentice at 16. He took up running as all employees had to take up a sport. He excelled at running and as a youth he was Staffordshire and Midland cross country champion. His talent was spotted by a coach from North Staffs and Stone Harriers who called at his home and asked him to join the club.

Alan's personal bests are:

800 m 1:48:02

880 yards 1:49

10 miles (road): 49:20 (John Oultram Memorial Race)
