= Vasily Savinkov =

Soviet middle-distance runner

Vasiliy Savinkov
Personal information
- Full name: Vasiliy Yegorovich Savinkov
- Nationality: Soviet
- Born: 1 February 1937 (age 89)

Sport
- Sport: Middle-distance running
- Event: 800 metres

Vasiliy Yegorovich Savinkov (Russian: Васи́лий Его́рович Са́винков; born 1 February 1937) is a Soviet middle-distance runner. He competed in the men's 800 metres at the 1960 Summer Olympics.
