= Paul Schmidt (runner) =

German middle-distance runner

Personal information
- Nationality: German
- Born: 9 August 1931 (age 94)

Sport
- Sport: Middle-distance running
- Event: 800 metres
Medal record
Men's athletics
Representing West Germany
European Championships
Bronze medal – third place	1958 Stockholm	800 m
Bronze medal – third place	1962 Belgrade	800 m

Paul Schmidt (born 9 August 1931) is a German middle-distance runner. He competed in the 800 metres at the 1956 Summer Olympics and the 1960 Summer Olympics.
