= Per Knuts =

Swedish middle-distance runner (1938–2022)

Personal information
- Nationality: Swedish
- Born: 1 June 1938 Bäckefors, Sweden
- Died: 9 January 2022 (aged 83)

Sport
- Sport: Middle-distance running
- Event: 800 metres

Per Knuts (1 June 1938 – 9 January 2022) was a Swedish middle-distance runner. He competed in the men's 800 metres at the 1960 Summer Olympics.
