= Olavi Vuorisalo =

Finnish middle-distance runner (1933–2024)

Personal information
- Nationality: Finnish
- Born: 5 April 1933 Kaarina, Finland
- Died: 11 December 2024 (aged 91)

Sport
- Sport: Middle-distance running
- Event: 1500 metres

Olavi Vuorisalo (5 April 1933 – 11 December 2024) was a Finnish middle-distance runner. He competed in the men's 1500 metres at the 1960 Summer Olympics. Vuorisalo died on 11 December 2024, at the age of 91.
