= Stig Lindbäck =

Swedish middle-distance runner

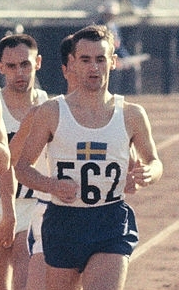
- Lindbäck at the 1964 Olympics

Personal information
- Born: 2 October 1937 Luleå, Norrbotten, Sweden
- Died: 14 March 1999 (aged 61) Uppsala, Sweden
- Height: 1.78 m (5 ft 10 in)
- Weight: 68 kg (150 lb)

Sport
- Sport: Athletics
- Event(s): 800 m, 1500 m
- Club: IFK Luleå; Västerås IK

Achievements and titles
- Personal best(s): 800 m – 1:48.6 (1964); 1500 m – 3:41.2

Stig Ragnar Lindbäck (2 October 1937 – 14 March 1999) was a Swedish middle-distance runner. He competed in the 800 m and 1500 m events at the 1964 Olympics, but failed to reach the finals. Lindbäck won the national 800 m title in 1962.
