= Paul Roekaerts =

Belgian middle-distance runner

Personal information
- Nationality: Belgian
- Born: 15 April 1939 (age 87)

Sport
- Sport: Middle-distance running
- Event: 800 metres

Paul Roekaerts (born 15 April 1939) is a Belgian middle-distance runner. He competed in the men's 800 metres at the 1964 Summer Olympics.
