= Kenth Andersson =

Swedish middle-distance runner (1944–2011)

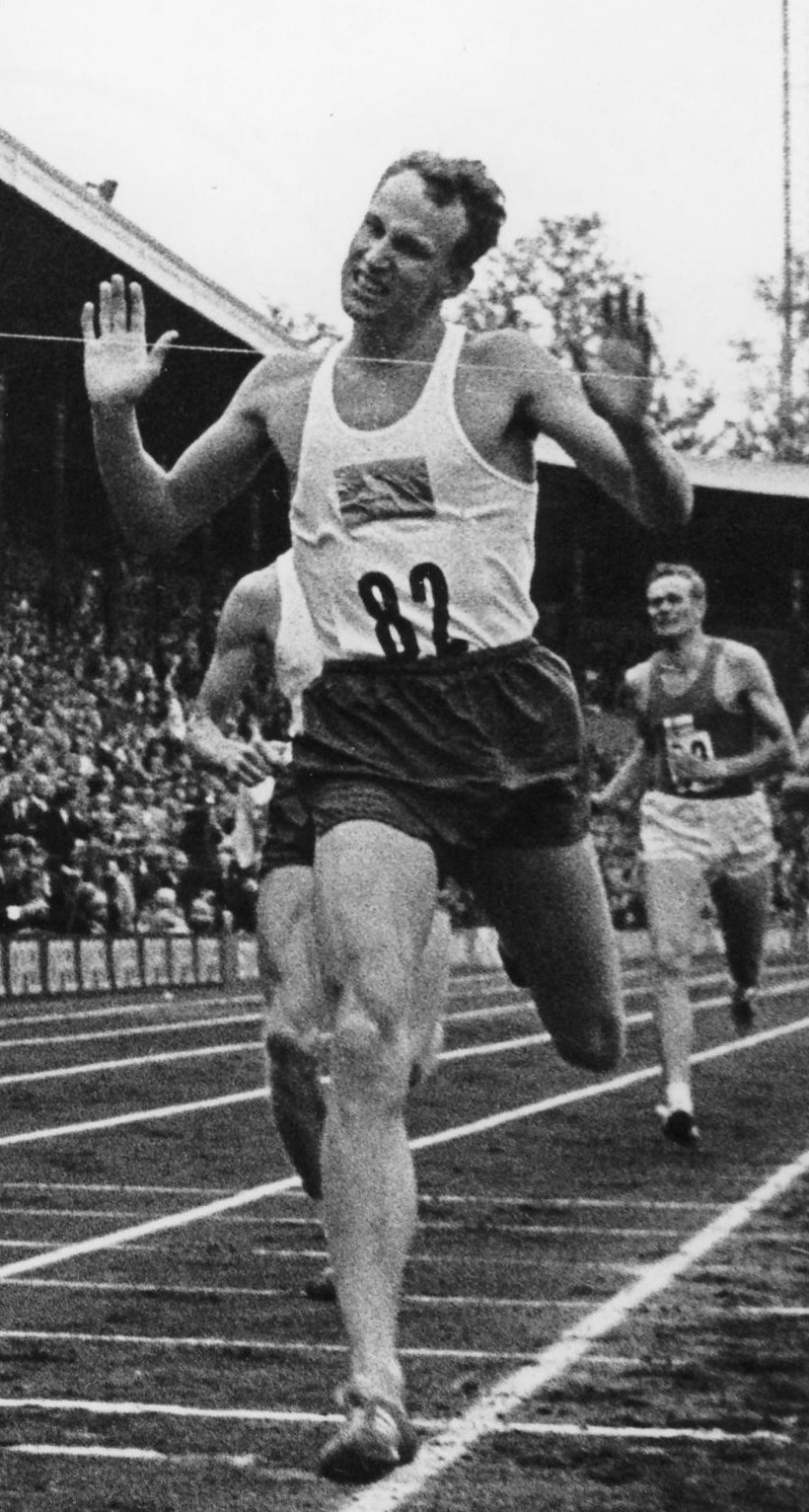
- Kenth Andersson in 1967

Personal information
- Born: 13 July 1944 Örebro, Sweden
- Died: 20 January 2011 (aged 66) Belgrade, Serbia

Sport
- Sport: Athletics
- Event(s): 800 m, 1500 m

Kenth Andersson (13 July 1944 – 20 January 2011) was a Swedish male middle-distance runner and running agent.

Andersson began to reach the peak of his athletic powers in the late 1960s. He was the Swedish champion over 800 metres and 1500 metres outdoors in 1966 and repeated the double at the 1967 Swedish indoor championships. Andersson also took a second outdoor 800 m national title that year. He gained an athletic scholarship at the United States International University in San Diego, California and won the 1000-yard run in 1970 at the NAIA Indoor Championships. In 1972 he again completed a middle-distance double at the Swedish indoor championships, and also competed as a guest at the Finnish indoors, where he won the 800 m title. He competed internationally for Sweden during his running career.

After retiring from athletics, he became an agent for other top level runners. He travelled frequently and spoke a number of languages. He remained a prominent figure in athletics circles and helped arrange interviews with Gunder Hägg – a Swedish runner and world record holder of the 1940s – for journalists, including acting as a translator. He spent much time in Belgrade, Serbia in his later years and acted as an advisor to those organising the Belgrade Marathon. He died in the Serbian capital at the age of 66 on 20 January 2011.

Following his death, the organisers of the Belgrade Marathon instituted the "Kenth Andersson Trophy" – an award to be given in recognition of those who have helped in the development of the competition.
