= Rein Tölp =

Estonian middle-distance runner (1941–2018)

Personal information
- Nationality: Estonian
- Born: 11 October 1941 Tallinn, Reichskommissariat Ostland
- Died: 16 April 2018 (aged 76) Tallinn, Estonia

Sport
- Sport: Middle-distance running
- Event: 800 metres

Rein Tölp (11 October 1941 – 16 April 2018) was an Estonian middle-distance runner. He competed in the men's 800 metres at the 1964 Summer Olympics, representing the Soviet Union.
