= Manfred Matuschewski =

East German middle-distance runner

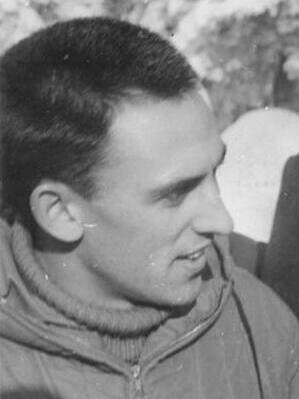
- Manfred Matuschewski in 1962

Medal record

Men's athletics

Representing East Germany

European Championships
Gold medal – first place	1962 Belgrade	800 m
Gold medal – first place	1966 Budapest	800 m
Bronze medal – third place	1969 Athens	800 m

Manfred Matuschewski (born 2 September 1939) is a German former track and field athlete.

Matuschewski was born in Weimar. He competed in the 800 m event where he finished sixth at the 1960 Olympics. He was a two-time European champion 1962 and 1966.
