= Walter Adams (runner) =

West German middle-distance runner (1945–2023)

Walter Adams (15 March 1945 – 30 October 2023) was a West German middle distance runner who specialized in the 800 metres.

== Biography ==
Adams finished fourth at the 1968 Olympic Games, and won a gold medal in 3 × 1000 metres relay at the 1969 European Indoor Games together with teammates Peter Adam and Harald Norpoth. He also competed at the 1966 European Championships and the Olympic Games without reaching the final.

His personal best time was 1:44.9 minutes, achieved in July 1970 in Stuttgart. This was the European record once. He also helped set two world records in 4 × 800 metres and 4 × 880 yards relay, in 1966 and 1968.

Adams competed for the sports club SV Salamander Kornwestheim during his active career. He became West German champion in 1968, 1969 and 1972.

Walter Adams died on 30 October 2023, at the age of 78.

Records
Preceded by (West Germany) Franz-Josef Kemper	European Record Holder Men's 800m 16 July 1970 – 19 August 1972	Succeeded by (Finland) Pekka Vasala
