= Jos Lambrechts =

Belgian middle-distance-runner

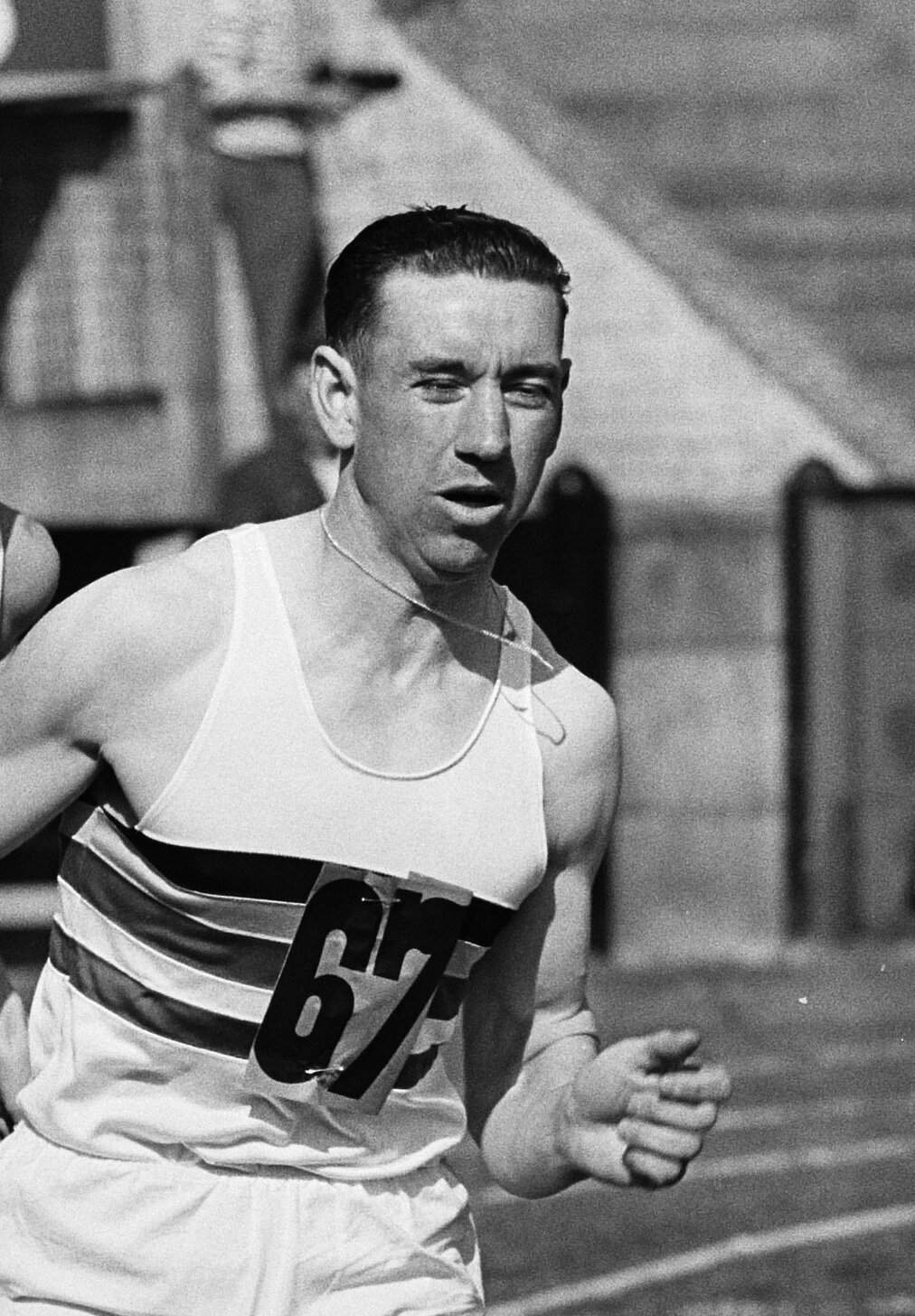
- Lambrechts in 1964

Personal information
- Nationality: Belgian
- Born: 27 February 1936
- Died: 22 February 2015 (aged 78)

Sport
- Sport: Middle-distance-running
- Events: 800 metres, 1500 metres, 4 × 400 metres relay

Jos Lambrechts (27 February 1936 – 22 February 2015) was a Belgian middle-distance runner. He competed in the men's 800 metres and the men's 4 × 400 metres relay at the 1960 Summer Olympics. Four years later, he competed in the men's 800 metres at the 1964 Summer Olympics.
