= Herb Elliott =

Australian middle-distance runner

Herb Elliott AC MBE
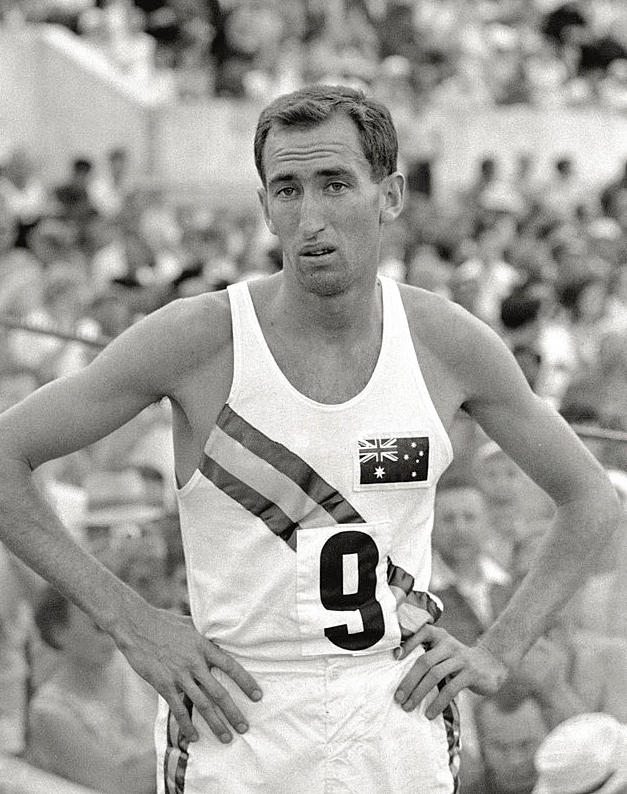
- Elliott at the 1960 Summer Olympics

Personal information
- Nickname: Herb
- Nationality: Australian
- Born: Herbert James Elliott; 25 February 1938 (age 88) Subiaco, Western Australia, Australia
- Height: 5 ft 11 in (180 cm)
- Weight: 150 lb (68 kg)

Sport
- Country: Australia
- Sport: Middle-distance running
- Coached by: Percy Cerutty

Achievements and titles
- Olympic finals: Rome 1960
- Personal bests: 800 m: 1:46.7 (1958); 1000 m: 2:19.1 (1960); 1500 m: 3:35.6 (1960, WR); 1 mile: 3:54.5 (1958, WR)
Medal record
Representing Australia
Olympic Games
| Gold medal – first place | 1960 Rome | 1500 metres |
Commonwealth Games
| Gold medal – first place | 1958 Cardiff | 880 yards |
| Gold medal – first place | 1958 Cardiff | 1 mile |

Herbert James Elliott AC MBE (born 25 February 1938) is an Australian former athlete and arguably the world's greatest middle-distance runner of his era. In August 1958 he set the world record in the mile run, clocking 3:54.5, 2.7 seconds under the record held by Derek Ibbotson; later in the month he set the 1500 metres world record, running 3:36.0, 2.1 seconds under the record held by Stanislav Jungwirth. In the 1500 metres at the 1960 Rome Olympics, he won the gold medal and bettered his own world record with a time of 3:35.6.

Elliot never lost a mile run and accomplished 36 wins over this distance. During his career, he broke four minutes for the mile on 17 occasions.

Elliott retired from athletics soon after the 1960 Olympics, at the age of 22. He made a career in business, and at one time was chairman of Fortescue. He was also chairman of Global Corporate Challenge health initiative.

== Biography ==
Elliott was born on 25 February 1938 at Kensington Hospital, Perth, Western Australia, to Herb (Note: Herb Elliott sen. was a prominent member of Apex; president of the Perth club and appointed Life Governor in 1953) and Eileen Elliott, née Carmody. He attended Aquinas College, Perth, where he was Head Prefect in the Class of 1955. The intense sporting culture at Aquinas provided an ideal grounding for Elliott to reach the highest levels of athletic achievement.

On 6 August 1958, Elliott set a new world record for the mile (3:54.5) at Morton Stadium in Dublin. Later that month he broke the 1500 metres world record in Gothenburg with a time of 3:36.0. His closest Australian rival at the time was Merv Lincoln.

=== Commonwealth and Olympic Games ===
At the 1958 Commonwealth Games in Cardiff, Wales, he won gold in the 880 yards and the mile. Two years later, at the 1960 Summer Olympics in Rome, Elliott won the 1500 m gold medal in world record time (3:35.6), finishing 2.6 seconds ahead of second placed Michel Jazy of France.

Elliott credited his visionary and iconoclastic coach, Percy Cerutty, with inspiration to train harder and more naturally than anyone of his era. Cerutty was known to avoid the track, talk about role models outside athletics (such as Leonardo da Vinci and Jesus), and bring his athletes to the unspoiled seaside beauty of Portsea training camp south of Melbourne, where Elliott would sprint up sand dunes until he dropped. "Faster", Cerutty would say, "it's only pain."

=== University education ===
Elliott originally studied at the University of Melbourne, where he was funded by a Shell Australia university scholarship. After winning in Rome in 1960, he started a further degree course in natural sciences at the University of Cambridge, having been awarded another scholarship by Shell at the behest of Lewis Luxton, an Australian executive at the company who had rowed for Cambridge in the 1932 Boat Race. Elliott matriculated at Jesus College, Cambridge, and received a third class in Part I of the natural sciences tripos in 1963. He retired from athletics after running the half-mile in the 1962 University v AAA match. During his years at Cambridge Elliott lived outside of college, residing with his family in a house in Fulbourn, Cambridgeshire.

=== Business ===
Elliott served as the CEO of Puma North America and between 2001 and 2006 as a board member at Ansell. From May 2005, he served as deputy chairman of Fortescue Metals Group, the world's fifth largest iron ore miner by capacity, and was the non-executive chairman of the firm from March 2007. On 18 August 2011, Elliott was expected to move from chairman to deputy chairman, handing over the role of chairman to Andrew Forrest.

=== Sydney Olympics ===
Elliott was one of the Olympic Torch bearers at the opening ceremony of the 2000 Summer Olympics in Sydney, and entered the stadium for the final segment before the lighting of the Olympic Flame.

=== Family ===
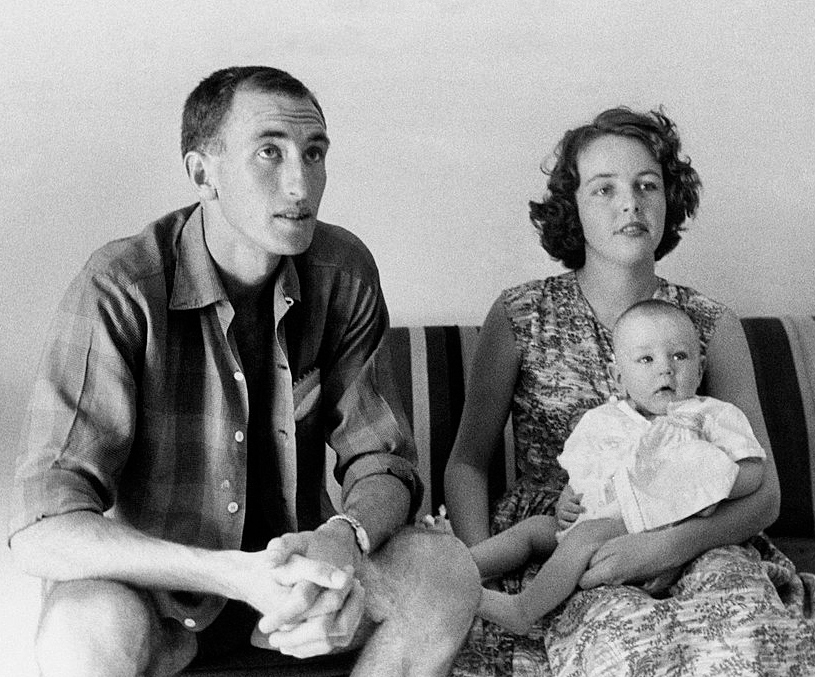
Elliott with family in Europe c. 1960

On 2 May 1959, Elliott married Anne Dudley, a hairdresser from Perth. They have six children.

== Honours ==
Elliott carried the torch of peace to the MCG when Pope John Paul II visited Melbourne in 1986.

His career inspired the 1962 Australian television play The Runner written by Alan Seymour.

In the Queen's Birthday Honours List of 1964, he was appointed a Member of the Order of the British Empire (MBE). In the Queen's Birthday Honours List of 2002, he was appointed a Companion of the Order of Australia (AC), to wit:

For service to community leadership through the development of sport in Australia, continuing involvement in the Olympic movement at national and international levels, and as a supporter and benefactor of community and charitable organisations for youth, health promotion and cultural understanding.

He is an Australian Living Treasure.

He was inducted into the Sport Australia Hall of Fame in 1985.

Fortescue Metals Group named a new port at Point Anderson (near Port Hedland, Western Australia) for him.

== Notes and references ==
Records
| Preceded by (Czechoslovakia) Stanislav Jungwirth | Men's 1500 m World Record Holder; 28 August 1958 – 8 July 1967 | Succeeded by (United States) Jim Ryun |
| Preceded by (United Kingdom) Derek Ibbotson | Men's Mile World Record Holder; 6 August 1958 – 27 January 1962 | Succeeded by (New Zealand) Peter Snell |
