= Jerry Siebert =

American runner (1938–2022)

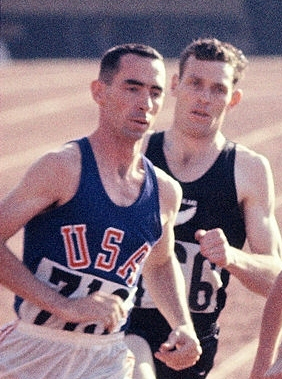
- Siebert (left) and Peter Snell at the 1964 Olympics

Personal information
- Born: October 6, 1938 Los Angeles, California, U.S.
- Died: December 30, 2022 (aged 84) Golden, Colorado, U.S.
- Height: 1.85 m (6 ft 1 in)
- Weight: 71 kg (157 lb)

Sport
- Sport: Athletics
- Event: 800 m
- Club: Santa Clara Valley Youth Village, California Golden Bears

Achievements and titles
- Personal bests: 800 m – 1:46.3y (1962); 1 mile – 4:12.4 (1960)

Jerome Francis Siebert (October 6, 1938 – December 30, 2022) was an American middle-distance runner. He competed in the 800 m at the 1960 and 1964 Olympics and finished in sixth place in 1964. In 1958 and 1960 he was part of the American relay teams that set world records in the 4×880 yd relay.

Siebert died in Golden, Colorado on December 30, 2022, at the age of 84.
