= Valery Bulyshev =

Soviet middle-distance runner

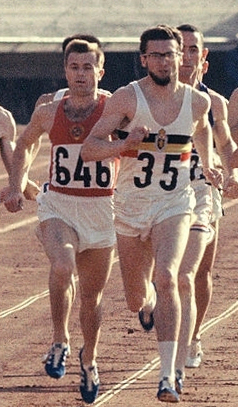
- Valery Bulyshev (left) at the 1964 Olympics

Personal information
- Born: 15 June 1939 Crimea, Soviet Union
- Died: 15 August 2013 (aged 74)
- Height: 1.77 m (5 ft 10 in)
- Weight: 75 kg (165 lb)

Sport
- Sport: Athletics
- Event: 800 m
- Club: Soviet Army Club
- Coached by: Vladimir Kuts

Achievements and titles
- Personal best: 800 – 1:46.9 (1964)
Medal record
Men's athletics
Representing the Soviet Union
European Championships
Silver medal – second place	1962 Belgrade	800 m

Valery Pavlovich Bulyshev (Russian: Валерий Павлович Булышев; 15 June 1939 – 15 August 2013) was a Soviet middle-distance runner who won a silver medal in the 800 m at the 1962 European Championships. He competed in the same event at the 1960 and 1964 Olympics, but failed to reach the finals.

Bulyshev was born in Crimea, but lived most of his life in Saint Petersburg. Between 1959 and 1966 he won 8 Soviet titles and set 12 Soviet records in middle-distance events. In retirement he worked as athletics coach.
