= Percy Cerutty =

Australian athletics coach (1895–1975)

Percy Wells Cerutty MBE
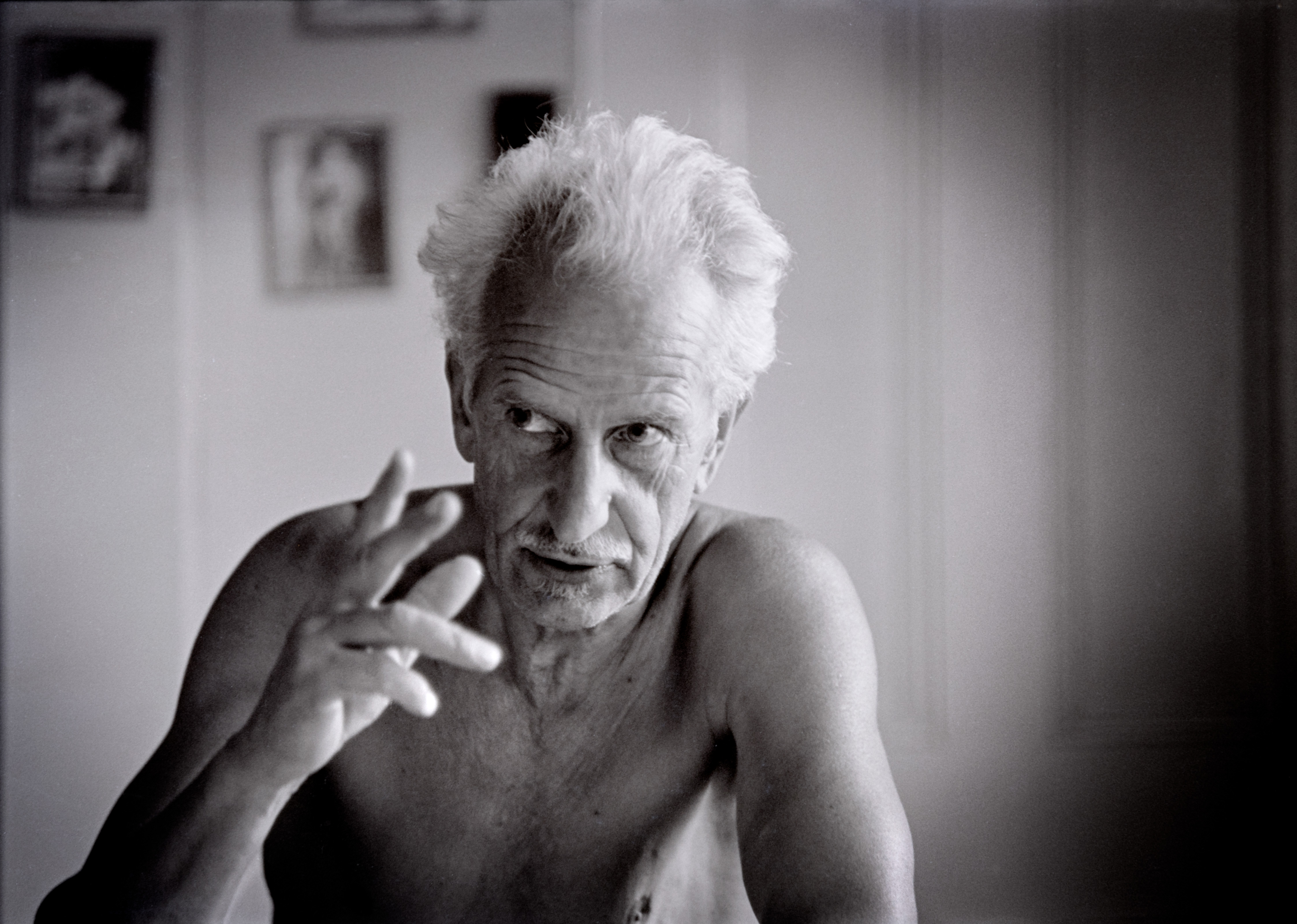
- Cerutty in 1961
- Born: Percy Wells Cerutty; 10 January 1895; Prahran, Victoria
- Died: 14 August 1975 (aged 80); Portsea, Victoria
- Occupations: Track and Field coach
- Spouse: Dorothy Clara Barwell (m.7 November 1921)

Percy Wells Cerutty MBE (10 January 1895 – 14 August 1975) was an Australian athletics coach in the 1950s and 1960s.

The eccentric Australian pioneered a home-spun system of "Stotan" training, embracing a holistic regime of natural diets, hard training in natural surroundings, and mental stimulation.

Cerutty coached Herb Elliott to a series of world record performances, culminating in an Olympic gold medal in the 1960 Rome Games.

== Early life ==
Percy Cerutty was born in Prahran, a suburb of Melbourne, in 1895, the seventh child of Harry Richard Cerutty, accountant, and his wife Emily, née Nielsen, both Victorians. He was four years old when his mother left her alcoholic husband to raise her six surviving children alone.

In 1907, aged 12, he left school to help support the family but was considered unfit to serve in World War I. He competed in athletics without distinction, suffering from illness after racing. Despite this fact, Cerutty was still determined to reach his highest potential.

In 1939, at the age of 43 Cerutty was faced with a formative challenge in his life; a nervous breakdown that necessitated taking leave from work at the Postmaster-General's Department and which prompted a reassessment of his life. After this, he began educating himself in healthy living. He focused on running and weight lifting.

== Athlete ==
During World War II, Cerutty began competing in distance running events. At the start of his career he failed to do much more than a jog. However, over the years he started making good strides towards being competitive in the running world. Right before he turned 51 he completed his first marathon in a time of 3 hours and 1 minute. In 1950, he retired from running after becoming the state marathon champion, setting Australian records for 30, 50 and 60 miles (48, 80 and 97 km), having begun the coaching for which he is renowned.

== Stotan philosophy ==
Cerutty's unique "Stotan" philosophies were a blend of Stoic and Spartan principles, a combination that provided Cerutty a base for training his athletes.

In 1946, Cerutty acquired 3/4 acres of land in Portsea with Dorothy Clara Barwell whom he had married in 1921, so that they could start a training camp there. In order to bring this new camp some attention, he ran 80 miles from Portsea to Melbourne. This act is reflective of his overall approach to the sport of distance running.

He introduced this approach to the athletes he trained at his Portsea headquarters. Training would involve running amongst idyllic environments, along beaches and over dunes, and it mixed poetry and philosophy with athletics training. His athletes would undertake a routine of challenging runs up sand dunes, on bark or wood chip paths, barefoot running and lifting weights frequently.

Athletes training under Cerutty said "You came here with the object of running more quickly, and achievement in running, but really it was an education in life" and "You got a whole philosophy of life and attitudes"

The new philosophy of life included the following tenets:

- Only consumption of whole wheat bread, as white flour was a poison.
- Reduced consumption of alcohol
- No consumption of cigarettes
- No consumption of water or drink with meals or following for a few hours
- No socialising after midnight

His philosophies were considered very strict in his time, and inevitably led to rivalries between Cerutty and other coaches who used different approaches to training.

Cerutty maintained a rivalry with fellow-coach Franz Stampfl whose Interval Training techniques were disliked by Cerutty.

Cerutty's training techniques will always remain controversial among those who study the sport of running. However, Cerutty believed that what he was doing created the most physically and mentally tough athletes.

Between 1959 and 1967, Cerutty published six books on his training philosophies.

=== Diet ===
Cerutty has been described by Neal Bascomb as eating a "vegetarian root-based diet", however, Cerutty was not a vegetarian in his personal life and in 1959 commented that "a proportion of meat and fish and poultry is included in the diet, liver being a must". Cerutty also preferred bananas and dairy products.

== Professional Trainer ==
Cerutty coached John Landy, Don Macmillan and Les Perry at Helsinki for the 1952 Olympic Games, but in 1953 announced that "All my enthusiasm for the amateur cause has had its day," and registered as a professional trainer with the Victorian Athletic League.

== Herb Elliott ==
Cerutty's greatest successes came through Herb Elliott. Elliott won two gold medals at the 1958 Empire Games, and set world records at Mile (3:54.5) and 1500 metres (3:36.0) during the year.

Cerutty began coaching Elliott when the runner was eighteen. Elliott was a 4:20 miler when he came to run for Cerutty, and within a few months, he had run 4:06 (a world record at the junior level).

Soon enough, Elliott topped Merv Lincoln to be the top miler in Australia. Lincoln was coached by Cerutty's rival Franz Stampfl. Lincoln and Elliott raced many times, but as Cerutty says of Lincoln "Never did he once beat my Herb Elliott." This quote demonstrates Cerutty's pride in coaching the great Herb Elliott, who continued to be a huge success for Cerutty.

At Rome in 1960, the 22-year-old Elliott set a world record to win the Olympic gold medal in the 1500 metres setting another world record of 3:35.6. Percy Cerutty along with coaches Forbes Carlile and Harry Gallagher provided the expertise for swimmers and athletes during Australia's "Golden Era" but they were disallowed official presence at Commonwealth and Olympic Games because of their "amateur" status.

Elliott broke the 4 minute barrier on 17 separate occasions; an extraordinary feat for athletes during his time period. Elliott was never bettered at the distance of a mile or the 1500.

At one point during his career, Elliott and Cerutty got in an argument. To solve the argument, Cerutty challenged Elliott to a mile race. Whoever won this race would also win the argument. Sure enough they raced and Cerutty was clearly beaten on time; he was racing the top miler in the world who didn't even have to try to win the race between the two of them. However, when Cerutty crossed the line, he told Elliott that he had won because he had put in more effort than Elliott. His point being that regardless of the circumstances, 100% effort should always be put forth. This story reflects accurately upon his "Stotan" training philosophy.

== Other athletes ==
Further athletes trained or assisted by Cerutty included:

- John Landy - 1956 Olympic Bronze Medal 1500 metres - World Mile Record. Second man to break the 4 minute mile after Roger Bannister
- Betty Cuthbert - 1964 Olympic Gold Medal 400 metres - World 440 yards Record
- Middle-distance runners Dave Stephens and Les Perry
- David (Dave) William Power - marathon runner - Olympic bronze medallist; dual Commonwealth Games gold medallist.

Cerutty also helped cyclist Russell Mockridge and boxer Jimmy Carruthers during their sporting careers. His strict training philosophy was not exclusive to distance running and could be transferred effectively to other sports because it taught competitors how to be tough; Cerutty saw his approach as a way of life and a way to train.

== Retirement ==
Cerutty gave up coaching athletes in 1969 and continued to live at his beloved Portsea home - CERES.

Cerutty was appointed a Member of the Order of the British Empire (MBE) in the 1972 Birthday Honours for services to sport and physical fitness, and described as "Australia's most enigmatic, pioneering and controversial athletics coach".

Posthumously Cerutty was inducted into the Sport Australia Hall of Fame for his athletics coaching on 5 December 1989.

== Personal life ==
Cerutty and Dorothy Clara Barwell married at the East Malvern Baptist Church on 7 November 1921. They divorced in 1955, then on 3 March 1958 he married divorcee Ellen Ann ('Nancy'), née Keene, late Armstrong, at the Unitarian manse, East Melbourne. He died of motor neurone disease on 14 August 1975 at his home in Portsea and is buried at Sorrento cemetery.
