= Arne Hamarsland =

Norwegian middle-distance runner (1933–2025)

Arne Hamarsland (24 July 1933 – 10 April 2025) was a Norwegian middle-distance runner who specialized in 1500 metres. He represented IL Gular.

== Biography ==
At the 1960 Summer Olympics, he finished ninth in the 1,500 m final in 3:45.0 minutes. He also competed at the 1958 European Championships without reaching the final. He became Norwegian champion in 800 m in 1960 and 1961 and in 1500 m in the years 1955–1956, 1959–1961, and 1963.

He represented the Centre Party for eight years in Ytrebygda borough council, and chaired Bergen Sports Council from 1997 to 1998.

Hamarsland died on 10 April 2025, at the age of 91.

== Personal bests ==
- 800 metres - 1:49.1 min (1958)
- 1500 metres - 3:39.8 min (1958) - twelfth among Norwegian 1500 m runners.
