= Egon Oehri =

Liechtenstein athlete (born 1940)

Personal information
- Born: 23 January 1940 (age 86) Mauren, Liechtenstein
- Height: 1.76 m (5 ft 9 1/2 in)
- Weight: 65 kg (143 lb)

Sport
- Sport: Track and field
- Event(s): Men's 800m, Men's 1,500m

Achievements and titles
- Personal best: 800m: 1:57.6 (Rome 1960)

Egon Oehri (born 23 January 1940) is a Liechtenstein athlete who competed at the 1960 Summer Olympics. He raced in two events, the 800m and the 1,500m. In the 800m he ran a time of 2:00.49, which put him in sixth place of heat five. He did not finish (DNF) in the 1,500m (heat 2) and his Personal Best for that event is unknown.

Liechtenstein entered five athletes for these games. Along with him competing in athletics was Alois Büchel.
