= Abram Kryvosheiev =

Belarusian middle-distance runner

Personal information
- Nationality: Belarusian
- Born: 12 November 1933
- Died: 4 January 2014 (aged 80)

Sport
- Sport: Middle-distance running
- Event: 800 metres

Abram Grigoryevich Kryvosheiev (Russian: Абрам Григорьевич Кривошеев; 12 November 1933 – 4 January 2014) was a Belarusian middle-distance runner. He competed in the 800 metres at the 1960 Summer Olympics and the 1964 Summer Olympics, representing the Soviet Union.
