= Lajos Kovács (runner) =

Hungarian middle-distance runner

Personal information
- Nationality: Hungarian
- Born: 22 February 1936
- Died: 6 November 1997 (aged 61)

Sport
- Sport: Middle-distance running
- Event: 800 metres

Lajos Kovács (22 February 1936 – 6 November 1997) was a Hungarian middle-distance runner. He competed in the men's 800 metres at the 1960 Summer Olympics.
