= Ron Delany =

Irish middle-distance runner (1935–2026)

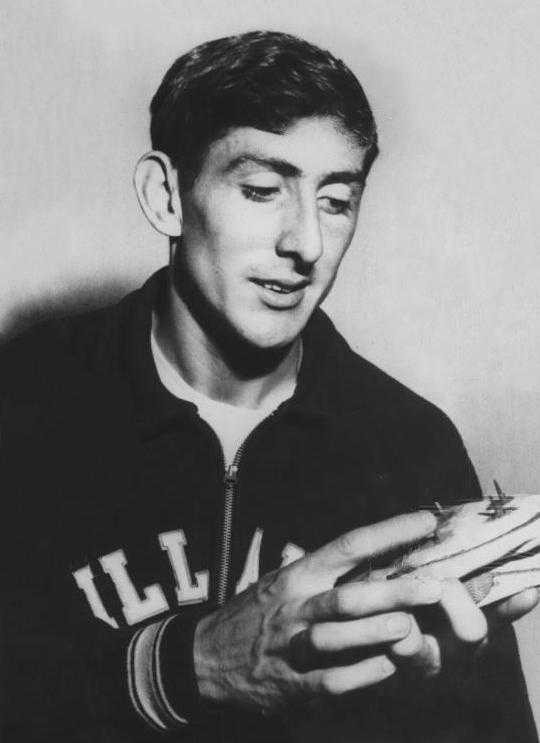
- Delany in 1957

Personal information
- Nickname: Ronnie
- Born: 6 March 1935 Arklow, County Wicklow, Ireland
- Died: 11 March 2026 (aged 91) Dublin, Ireland
- Height: 184 cm (6 ft 0 in)
- Weight: 75 kg (165 lb)

Sport
- Country: Ireland
- Sport: Athletics
- Events: 800 m, 1500 m
- Club: Crusaders Athletic Club, Dublin
- Coached by: Jumbo Elliott
- Retired: 1962

Achievements and titles
- Olympic finals: 1956 Summer Olympics, 1960 Summer Olympics
- Regional finals: 1954 European Athletics Championships, 1958 European Athletics Championships
- Personal bests: 800 m: 1:47.1 (1961); 1500 m: 3:41.49 (1956); Mile: 3:57.5 (1958)
Medal record
Men's athletics
Representing Ireland
Olympic Games
| Gold medal – first place | 1956 Melbourne | 1500 m |
European Championships
| Bronze medal – third place | 1958 Stockholm | 1500 m |
World University Games
| Gold medal – first place | 1961 Sofia | 800 m |
- Updated on 29 July 2012

Ronald Michael Delany (6 March 1935 – 11 March 2026) was an Irish athlete who specialised in middle-distance running. He won a gold medal in the 1500 metres at the 1956 Summer Olympics. He later earned a bronze medal in the 1500 metres event at the 1958 European Athletics Championships in Stockholm.

Delany also competed at the 1954 European Athletics Championships in Bern and the 1960 Summer Olympics, though he was less successful on these occasions. He retired from competitive athletics in 1962. Delany was one of Ireland's most recognisable Olympians and international ambassadors.

== Early life ==
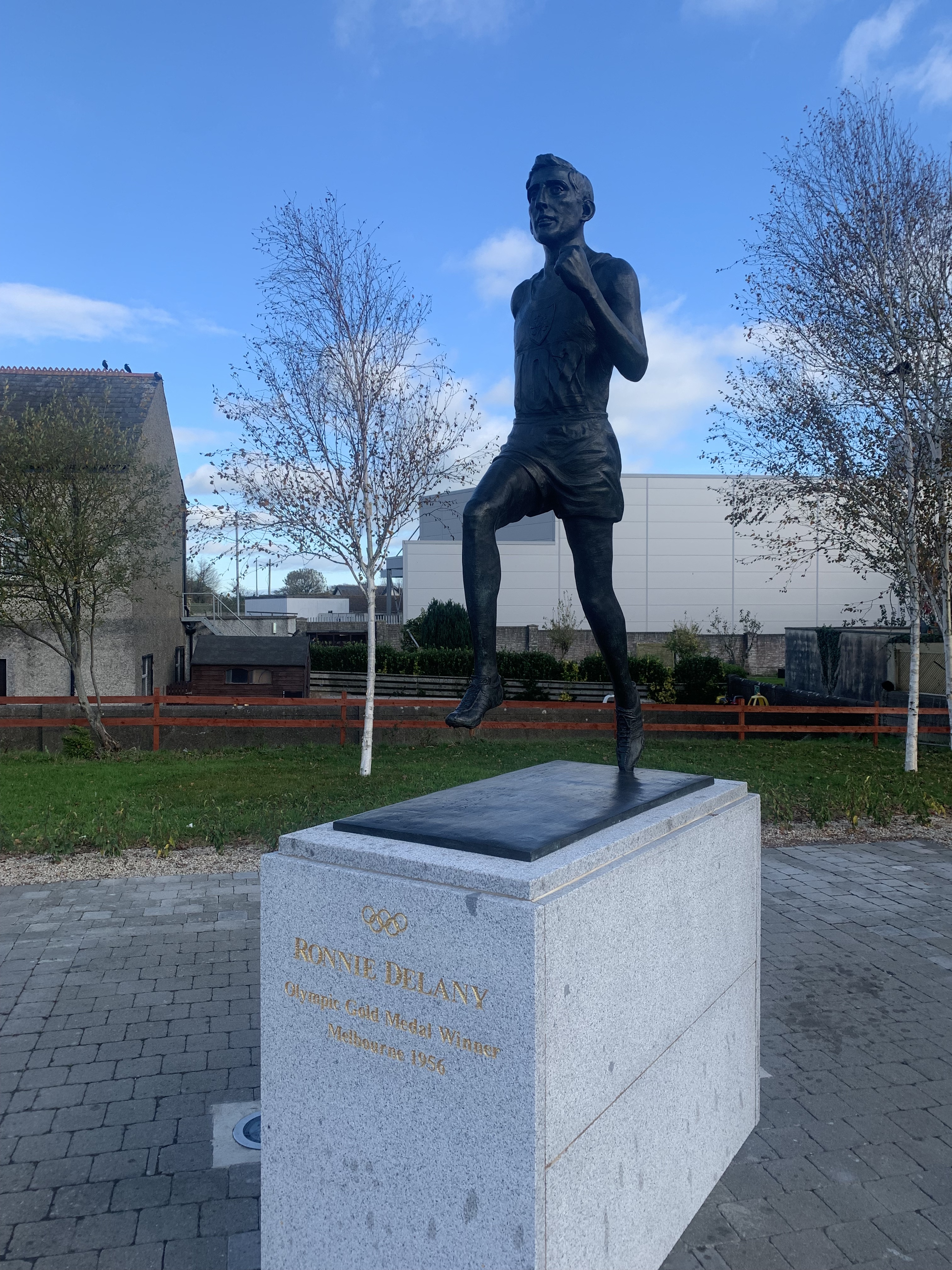
The Ronnie Delany Statue in Arklow

Born in Arklow, County Wicklow, on 6 March 1935, to customs officer Patrick Delany and his wife Bridget, Delany moved with his family to Sandymount, Dublin 4, when he was six years old. Delany was educated at the Christian Brothers' O'Connell School on North Richmond Street (where there are all-weather, floodlit sports facilities named in his honour), and later Catholic University School (CUS). There, he began competing in athletics competitions as a teenager. At CUS, Delany was first coached by Jack Sweeney, to whom he sent a telegram from Melbourne following his 1956 Olympic gold medal, stating "We did it Jack". Delany in 2008 said about Sweeney, "Other people would have seen my potential but he was the one who in effect helped me execute my potential."

After being recruited by Villanova champion track and field athlete Fred Dwyer, Delany received a scholarship at Villanova University in the United States, where he studied commerce and finance. While there, he was coached by the American track coach Jumbo Elliott, who encouraged him to compete in the mile distance. One of his friends and teammates at Villanova was Charles Jenkins Sr., the first African American scholarship track and field athlete at Villanova, and who would later win two gold medals at the 1956 Melbourne Olympics. Delany graduated from Villanova in 1958, and preceded other Irish athletes who later competed for Villanova including Eamonn Coghlan, Marcus O'Sullivan and Sonia O'Sullivan, dubbed the "Irish Pipeline".

== Career ==
Delany's first achievement of note was reaching the final of the 800 metres at the 1954 European Athletics Championships in Bern, his competition debut. In 1956, he became the seventh runner to join the club of four-minute milers, but nonetheless, he struggled to make the Irish team for the 1956 Summer Olympics, held in Melbourne.

Delany qualified for the Olympic 1,500 metres final, in which local runner John Landy was the favourite. Delany kept close to Landy until the final lap, when Delany started a crushing final sprint, winning the race in a new Olympic record. Delany thereby became the first Irishman to win an Olympic gold medal in athletics since Bob Tisdall and Pat O'Callaghan in 1932. The Irish people learned of its new champion at breakfast time. Delany was Ireland's last Olympic champion for 36 years, until Michael Carruth won the gold medal in boxing at the 1992 Summer Olympics.

Delany won the British AAA Championships title in the 880 yards event at the 1957 AAA Championships and the bronze medal in the 1,500 metres event at the 1958 European Athletics Championships. He went on to represent Ireland once again at the 1960 Summer Olympics held in Rome, this time in the 800 metres. He finished sixth in his quarter-final heat, hindered by an injury to his Achilles' tendon, and did not participate in the 1,500 metres, a distance in which he was originally supposed to compete.

Delany continued his running career in North America, winning four successive AAU titles in the mile, adding to his total of four Irish national titles, and four NCAA titles. At Villanova, he was NCAA champion in 1955 in the mile, in 1956 in the 1,500 metres distance, and in the mile and half mile in 1958. He was next to unbeatable on indoor tracks over that period, which included a 40-race winning streak. He also broke the World Indoor Mile Record on three occasions. For his feats, he was featured on the cover of U.S. sports magazine Sports Illustrated in February 1959. In 1961, Delany won the gold medal in the World University games in Sofia, Bulgaria. He retired from competitive running in 1962, when he was 26 years old.

== Post-retirement ==
After retiring from competition, Delany first worked in the United States for the Irish airline Aer Lingus. After that, for around two decades, he was assistant chief executive of B&I Line, later known as Irish Ferries, specialising in marketing. In 1988, he established his own company focused on marketing and sports consultancy.

== Personal life and death ==
On the same day as his retirement, Delany announced his engagement to Joan Riordan. The couple married in August 1962 at the Church of the Holy Cross in Dundrum, Dublin, and went on to have four children.

Delany died following a short illness on 11 March 2026, five days after his 91st birthday. His wife Joan died only a week later, on 18 March.

== Honours ==
In 2006, Delany was granted the Freedom of the City of Dublin. He was also conferred with an honorary Doctor of Laws Degree by University College Dublin in 2006. In 2019, a housing scheme in Arklow, where Delany was born, was named Delany Park in his honour. He attended the opening in person. Similarly, two streets in Strabane in Northern Ireland were named Delaney Crescent and Olympic Drive in the 1950s in his honour – however, Delany was not aware of these until it was pointed out that his surname had been spelt wrongly.
