= Tomáš Jungwirth =

Czech middle-distance runner

Personal information
- Nationality: Czech
- Born: 24 November 1942 Prague, Czechoslovakia
- Died: 19 January 1998 (aged 55) Prague, Czech Republic

Sport
- Sport: Middle-distance running
- Event: 800 metres

Tomáš Jungwirth (24 November 1942 – 19 January 1998) was a Czech middle-distance runner. He competed in the men's 800 metres at the 1968 Summer Olympics.
