= Noel Carroll (athlete) =

Irish middle-distance runner (1941–1998)

Personal information
- Nationality: Irish
- Born: 7 December 1941 Annagassan, Ireland
- Died: 23 October 1998 (aged 56) Dublin, Ireland
- Height: 1.88 m (6 ft 2 in)
- Weight: 79 kg (174 lb)

Sport
- Sport: Running
- Events: 400 metres, 800 metres, 4 × 800 metres relay
- College team: Villanova Wildcats
- Club: Civil Service Harriers A.C., Dublin

Noel Carroll (7 December 1941 – 23 October 1998) was an Irish middle distance runner who won a bronze medal in the 1969 European Indoor Athletics Championships. He set European and World Records in the 1960s. He became the Dublin Corporation's first official spokesman, and later the chief executive of the Dublin Chamber of Commerce, and led the group which founded the Dublin Marathon.

== Career ==
Carroll was born in Annagassan, County Louth, in 1941, and left school to join the Army where he began running. In 1962, while competing in the Millrose Games in New York City, he was recruited by "Jumbo Elliott" and attended Villanova University, where he joined the university's athletics team, the Villanova Wildcats and won a number of track championships.

Carroll won the British AAA Championships title in the 880 yards event at the 1963 AAA Championships and would go on to win two more AAA titles at the 1966 AAA Championships and 1968 AAA Championships.

At Villanova, he ran a sub-four-minute mile and in 1964, was the anchor for the team which broke the 4 × 880 yard relay World Record. In the same year, he also set the European Indoor record for the 880 yards and competed in the Olympic Games in Tokyo in the Men's 800 metres finishing just outside of the qualifying places in heat 5 of the first round with a time of 1:51.1. When running against Bill Crothers in 1964, Sports Illustrated described Carroll as "one of the best middle-distance runners in the world".

He represented Ireland in the 400 metres (time: 46.8) and the 800 metres (time: 1:49) in the 1968 Summer Olympics in Mexico City, and continued to win national championships (14 in total). He won a bronze medal in the 800 m at the 1969 European Indoor Championships in Belgrade.

In 1972, he became the spokesman for the Dublin Corporation (now known as Dublin City Council), a post he held until 1996, when he joined the Dublin Chamber of Commerce as its chief executive.

== Dublin Marathon ==
In 1980, Carroll led a group which approached the Business Houses Athletic Association and the Dublin Corporation with the idea for the Dublin Marathon. Carroll was also among the 2,100 people who competed in the race that year. The winner of the Marathon receives the Noel Carroll Memorial Trophy presented each year by one of Carroll's children.

Noel Carroll died on 23 October 1998, after suffering a heart attack while training at University College Dublin. In 2008, Carroll's four children took part in the Dublin Marathon to raise money for the Noel Carroll Building, the headquarters of a project in Kolkata run by GOAL, a charity for which Carroll had served as the chairman.

== Personal life ==
Carroll's grandson is the Irish rugby international player, Jordi Murphy.
