= Austria at the 2018 European Athletics Championships =

- WA code: AUT
- National federation: ÖLV
- Website: www.oelv.at

in Berlin
- Competitors: 16
- Medals Ranked 24th: Gold 0 Silver 0 Bronze 2 Total 2

European Athletics Championships appearances
- 1934; 1938–1946; 1950; 1954; 1958; 1962; 1966; 1969; 1971; 1974; 1978; 1982; 1986; 1990; 1994; 1998; 2002; 2006; 2010; 2012; 2014; 2016; 2018; 2022; 2024; 2026

Austria competed at the 2018 European Athletics Championships in Berlin, Germany, from 6–12 August 2018. A delegation of 16 athletes were sent to represent the country.

The following athletes were selected to compete by the Austrian Athletics Federation.

== Medals ==
Medal	Name	Event	Date
Bronze	Lukas Weißhaidinger	Men's discus throw	8 August
Bronze	Lemawork Ketema; Peter Herzog; Christian Steinhammer	Women's Marathon cup	12 August

== Results ==
Men
Track and road

Athletes	Event	Heats		Semifinal		Final	
Athletes	Event	Result	Rank	Result	Rank	Result	Rank
Markus Fuchs	100 metres	10.57	34	did not advance			
Markus Fuchs	200 metres	21.29	25	did not advance			
Andreas Vojta	5000 metres	—N/a				13:42.75	19
Peter Herzog	Marathon	—N/a				2:15:29	10
Lemawork Ketema	Marathon	—N/a				2:13:22	8
Valentin Pfeil	Marathon	—N/a				DNF	DNF
Christian Steinhammer	Marathon	—N/a				2:20:40	41
Lemawork Ketema; Peter Herzog; Christian Steinhammer	Marathon Cup	—N/a				6:49:29	3rd place, bronze medalist(s)
Luca Sinn	3000 metres steeplechase	8:44.80	22	—N/a		did not advance	

Field events

Athletes	Event	Qualification		Final	
Athletes	Event	Distance	Position	Distance	Position
Lukas Weißhaidinger	Discus throw	62.26	11 q	65.14	3rd place, bronze medalist(s)

Combined events – Decathlon

Athlete	Event	100 m	LJ	SP	HJ	400 m	110H	DT	PV	JT	1500 m	Final	Rank
Dominik Distelberger	Result	11.00	7.16	12.60	1.90	48.89	14.61	43.66	4.60	54.43	DNS	DNF	
Dominik Distelberger	Points	861	852	643	714	866	897	739	790	654	DNS	DNF	

Women
Track and road

Athletes	Event	Heats		Semifinal		Final	
Athletes	Event	Result	Rank	Result	Rank	Result	Rank
Alexandra Tóth	100 metres	11.69	19	did not advance			
Nada Pauer	5000 metres	—N/a				DQ	
Stephanie Bendrat	100 metres hurdles	—N/a		13.43	23	did not advance	
Beate Schrott	100 metres hurdles	13.06	4 Q	13.23	21	did not advance	

Combined events – Heptathlon

Athlete	Event	100H	HJ	SP	200 m	LJ	JT	800 m	Final	Rank
Ivona Dadic	Result	13.66	1.82	14.06	23.61	6.35	47.42	2:11:87	6552	4
Ivona Dadic	Points	1027	1003	798	1018	959	810	937	6552	4
Sarah Lagger	Result	14.46	1.76	13.54	25.16	6.14	45.30	2:13.14	6058	13
Sarah Lagger	Points	914	928	763	872	893	769	919	6058	13
Verena Preiner	Result	13.58	1.73	13.76	24.12	6.09	48.79	2:11.29	6337	8
Verena Preiner	Points	1039	891	778	969	877	837	946	6337	8
