= Austria at the 2024 European Athletics Championships =

- Flag of Austria
- WA code: AUT

in Rome, Italy 4−7 June 2024
- Competitors: 22 (11 men and 11 women)
- Medals Ranked 15th: Gold 1 Silver 1 Bronze 0 Total 2

European Athletics Championships appearances
- 1934; 1938–1946; 1950; 1954; 1958; 1962; 1966; 1969; 1971; 1974; 1978; 1982; 1986; 1990; 1994; 1998; 2002; 2006; 2010; 2012; 2014; 2016; 2018; 2022; 2024; 2026

Austria competed at the 2024 European Athletics Championships in Rome, Italy from 7–12 June 2024.

== Medallists ==
Medal	Name	Event	Date
Gold	Victoria Hudson	Women's javelin throw	11 June
Silver	Lukas Weißhaidinger	Men's discus throw	7 June

== Results ==
Austria entered the following athletes.

Key

- Q = Qualified for the next round
- q = Qualified for the next round as a fastest loser or, in field events, by position without achieving the qualifying target
- NR = National record
- PB = Personal best
- SB = Season best
- N/A = Round not applicable for the event

=== Men ===
Track and road events

Athlete	Event	Heat		Semifinal		Final	
Athlete	Event	Result	Rank	Result	Rank	Result	Rank
Markus Fuchs	100 metres	Bye		10.29	13	Did not advance	
Raphael Pallitsch	1500 metres	3:44.29	6 Q	—N/a		3:33.60	6
Mario Bauernfeind	Half marathon	—N/a				1:08:03	54
Peter Herzog	Half marathon	—N/a				1:06:07 SB	49
Timo Hinterndorfer	Half marathon	—N/a				1:04:27	32
Dominik Stadlmann	Half marathon	—N/a				1:09:03	57
Andreas Vojta	Half marathon	—N/a				1:05:38	42
Mario Bauernfeind; Peter Herzog; Timo Hinterndorfer; Dominik Stadlmann; Andreas Vojta	Marathon team	—N/a				3:16:12	9
Enzo Diessl	110 metres hurdles	13.56	2 q	13.71	17	Did not advance	
Leo Köhldorfer	400 metres hurdles	51.52	21	Did not advance			
Tobias Rattinger	3000 metres steeplechase	8:44.60	13	—N/a		Did not advance	

Field events

Athlete	Event	Qualification		Final	
Athlete	Event	Distance	Position	Distance	Position
Lukas Weißhaidinger	Discus throw	63.99	4 q	67.70	2nd place, silver medalist(s)

=== Women ===
Track and road events

Athlete	Event	Heat		Semifinal		Final	
Athlete	Event	Result	Rank	Result	Rank	Result	Rank
Magdalena Lindner	100 metres	11.52	17	Did not advance			
Susanne Gogl-Walli	400 metres	Bye		51.14 SB	8 q	51.23	7
Julia Mayer	Half marathon	—N/a				1:12:40	36
Karin Strametz	100 metres hurdles	12.99	4 q	12.87 PB	10	Did not advance	
Lena Millonig	3000 metres steeplechase	9:57.50	15	—N/a		Did not advance	
Isabel Posch; Magdalena Lindner; Karin Strametz; Viktoria Willhuber	4 × 100 metres relay	43.84 NR	12	—N/a		Did not advance	

Field events

Athlete	Event	Qualification		Final	
Athlete	Event	Distance	Position	Distance	Position
Victoria Hudson	Javelin throw	60.15	5 q	64.62	1st place, gold medalist(s)

Combined events – Heptathlon

Athlete	Event	100H	HJ	SP	200 m	LJ	JT	800 m	Final	Rank
Verena Mayr	Result	13.93	1.71	DNF						
Verena Mayr	Points	988	867	DNF						
Isabel Posch	Result	13.56 SB	1.68 SB	12.50	24.06 SB	6.08	45.08 SB	2:22.06 SB	5975 SB	15
Isabel Posch	Points	1041	830	694	975	874	765	796	5975 SB	15
