= Austria at the 2018 European Championships =

- IOC code: AUT

in (United Kingdom) Glasgow (Germany) Berlin 2 August 2018 – 12 August 2018
- Competitors: 91 in 7 sports
- Medals Ranked 27th: Gold 0 Silver 1 Bronze 3 Total 4

European Championships appearances
- 2018; 2022

Austria competed at the inaugural 7 sports 2018 European Championships from 2 to 12 August 2018. It competed in all sports.

== Medallists ==
Medal	Name	Sport	Event	Date
Silver	Magdalena Lobnig	Rowing	Women's single sculls	5 August
Bronze	Stefan Matzner	Cycling	Men's points race	5 August
Bronze	Lukas Weißhaidinger	Athletics	Men's discus throw	8 August
Bronze	Lemawork Ketema; Peter Herzog; Christian Steinhammer	Athletics	Men's marathon team	12 August

== Aquatics ==
=== Diving ===
Men

Athlete	Event	Preliminaries		Final	
Athlete	Event	Points	Rank	Points	Rank
Nikolaj Schaller	1 m springboard	222.30	27	did not advance	
Nikolaj Schaller	3 m springboard	226.05	25	did not advance	

Women

Athlete	Event	Preliminaries		Final	
Athlete	Event	Points	Rank	Points	Rank
Selina Staudenherz	3 m springboard	213.25	17	did not advance	

Mixed

Athlete	Event	Final	
Athlete	Event	Points	Rank
Nikolaj Schaller; Selina Staudenherz	3 m springboard synchro	207.84	10

=== Swimming ===
Men

Athlete	Event	Heats		Semifinal		Final	
Athlete	Event	Result	Rank	Result	Rank	Result	Rank
Felix Auböck	200 metre freestyle	1:48.37	9 Q	1:47.81	11	did not advance	
Felix Auböck	400 metre freestyle	3:48.01	4 Q	—N/a		3:47.24	4
Felix Auböck	800 metre freestyle	7:55.56	12	—N/a		did not advance	
Valentin Bayer	50 metre breaststroke	28.33	31	did not advance			
Valentin Bayer	100 metre breaststroke	1:01.24	24	did not advance			
Valentin Bayer	200 metre breaststroke	2:11.73	13 Q	2:12.33	14	did not advance	
David Brandl	5 kilometre open water	—N/a				53:22.5	19
David Brandl	10 kilometre open water	—N/a				1:50:59.6	23
Simon Bucher	50 metre butterfly	24.59	49	did not advance			
Simon Bucher	100 metre butterfly	55.42	54	did not advance			
Johannes Dietrich	50 metre breaststroke	29.49	48	did not advance			
Johannes Dietrich	100 metre breaststroke	1:01.80	33	did not advance			
Johannes Dietrich	200 metre breaststroke	2:14.30	28	did not advance			
Paul Espernberger	50 metre butterfly	25.26	60	did not advance			
Paul Espernberger	100 metre butterfly	55.37	52	did not advance			
Paul Espernberger	200 metre butterfly	2:03.12	29	did not advance			
Xaver Gschwentner	50 metre butterfly	25.42	62	did not advance			
Xaver Gschwentner	100 metre butterfly	54.95	49	did not advance			
Xaver Gschwentner	200 metre butterfly	1:59.36	19	did not advance			
Bernhard Reitshammer	50 metre freestyle	22.97	34	did not advance			
Bernhard Reitshammer	100 metre freestyle	49.94	31	did not advance			
Bernhard Reitshammer	50 metre backstroke	25.78	29	did not advance			
Bernhard Reitshammer	100 metre backstroke	55.06	21	did not advance			
Bernhard Reitshammer	50 metre breaststroke	27.66	14 Q	27.47	13	did not advance	
Christopher Rothbauer	50 metre breaststroke	28.09	27	did not advance			
Christopher Rothbauer	100 metre breaststroke	1:01.23	23	did not advance			
Christopher Rothbauer	200 metre breaststroke	2:12.61	17 Q	2:12.44	15	did not advance	
Patrick Staber	200 metre backstroke	2:05.51	35	did not advance			
Patrick Staber	200 metre butterfly	1:58.96	16 Q	1:59.46	16	did not advance	
Patrick Staber	400 metre individual medley	4:22.48	21	—N/a		did not advance	
Alexander Trampitsch	50 metre freestyle	23.19	45	did not advance			
Alexander Trampitsch	100 metre freestyle	50.06	40	did not advance			
Alexander Trampitsch	200 metre freestyle	1:50.06	34	did not advance			
Heiko Gigler; Robin Grünberger; Bernhard Reitshammer; Alexander Trampitsch	4 × 100 metre freestyle relay	3:18.91	15	—N/a		did not advance	
Xaver Gschwentner; Bernhard Reitshammer; Christopher Rothbauer; Alexander Trampitsch	4 × 100 metre medley relay	3:40.19	14	—N/a		did not advance	

Women

Athlete	Event	Heats		Semifinal		Final	
Athlete	Event	Result	Rank	Result	Rank	Result	Rank
Lena Grabowski	50 metre backstroke	30.03	42	did not advance			
Lena Grabowski	100 metre backstroke	1:03.36	36	did not advance			
Lena Grabowski	200 metre backstroke	2:15.30	16 Q	2:15.08	15	did not advance	
Elena Guttmann	50 metre breaststroke	32.11	25	did not advance			
Elena Guttmann	100 metre breaststroke	1:11.53	42	did not advance			
Elena Guttmann	200 metre breaststroke	2:36.96	31	did not advance			
Claudia Hufnagl	50 metre butterfly	28.79	40	did not advance			
Claudia Hufnagl	100 metre butterfly	1:02.36	32	did not advance			
Claudia Hufnagl	200 metre butterfly	DNS		did not advance			
Marlene Kahler	200 metre freestyle	2:02.02	31	did not advance			
Marlene Kahler	400 metre freestyle	4:23.70	24	—N/a		did not advance	
Marlene Kahler	800 metre freestyle	8:46.82	13	—N/a		did not advance	
Marlene Kahler	1500 metre freestyle	16:49.10	11	—N/a		did not advance	
Lena Kreundl	50 metre freestyle	25.82	29	did not advance			
Lena Kreundl	200 metre freestyle	2:02.10	32	did not advance			
Cornelia Pammer	50 metre freestyle	26.77	45	did not advance			
Cornelia Pammer	50 metre breaststroke	32.48	31	did not advance			
Cornelia Pammer	100 metre breaststroke	1:10.35	35	did not advance			
Cornelia Pammer	200 metre individual medley	DNS		did not advance			
Caroline Pilhatsch	50 metre backstroke	DSQ		did not advance			
Caroline Pilhatsch	100 metre backstroke	1:01.73	23	did not advance			
Caroline Pilhatsch	50 metre butterfly	27.72	30	did not advance			
Marlene Kahler; Lena Kreundl; Lena Opatril; Cornelia Pammer	4 × 200 metre freestyle relay	8:10.94	10	—N/a		did not advance	
Elena Guttmann; Lena Kreundl; Cornelia Pammer; Caroline Pilhatsch	4 × 100 metre medley relay	4:13.88	15	—N/a		did not advance	

Mixed

Athlete	Event	Heats		Final	
Athlete	Event	Result	Rank	Result	Rank
Lena Kreundl; Cornelia Pammer; Bernhard Reitshammer; Alexander Trampitsch	4 × 100 metre freestyle relay	3:31.93	11	did not advance	
Claudia Hufnagl; Lena Kreundl; Bernhard Reitshammer; Christopher Rothbauer	4 × 100 metre medley relay	3:55.00	14	did not advance	

=== Synchronised swimming ===
Athlete	Event	Preliminaries		Final	
Athlete	Event	Points	Rank	Points	Rank
Vasiliki Alexandri	Solo free routine	85.8667	7 Q	86.0333	7
Vasiliki Alexandri	Solo technical routine	—N/a		85.6352	6
Anna-Maria Alexandri; Eirini Alexandri; Vasiliki Alexandri	Duet free routine	86.5667	7 Q	87.1667	7
Anna-Maria Alexandri; Eirini Alexandri; Vasiliki Alexandri	Duet technical routine	—N/a		86.2548	5
Hanna-Kinga Bekesi; Raffaela Breit; Verena Breit; Marlene Gerhalter; Vassilissa Neussl; Luna Pajer; Yvette Pinter; Sahra Vakil Adli	Team free routine	77.0667	10 Q	78.5667	11
Hanna-Kinga Bekesi; Raffaela Breit; Verena Breit; Marlene Gerhalter; Vassilissa Neussl; Luna Pajer; Yvette Pinter; Sahra Vakil Adli	Team technical routine	—N/a		77.2775	10
Vasiliki Alexandri; Hanna-Kinga Bekesi; Raffaela Breit; Verena Breit; Marlene Gerhalter; Vassilissa Neussl; Luna Pajer; Yvette Pinter; Sahra Vakil Adli	Combination routine	—N/a		80.0000	9

== Athletics ==
Men
Track and road

Athlete	Event	Heats		Semifinal		Final	
Athlete	Event	Result	Rank	Result	Rank	Result	Rank
Markus Fuchs	100 metres	10.57	34	did not advance			
Markus Fuchs	200 metres	21.29	25	did not advance			
Andreas Vojta	5000 metres	—N/a				13:42.75 SB	19
Peter Herzog	Marathon	—N/a				2:15:29 PB	10
Lemawork Ketema	Marathon	—N/a				2:13:22 PB	8
Valentin Pfeil	Marathon	—N/a				DNF	
Christian Steinhammer	Marathon	—N/a				2:20:40	41
Peter Herzog; Lemawork Ketema; Christian Steinhammer	Marathon team	—N/a				6:49:29	Bronze medal
Luca Sinn	3000 metres steeplechase	8:44.80 PB	22	—N/a		did not advance	

Field events

Athletes	Event	Qualification		Final	
Athletes	Event	Distance	Position	Distance	Position
Lukas Weißhaidinger	Discus throw	62.26	11 q	65.14	Bronze medal

Combined events – Decathlon

Athlete	Event	100 m	LJ	SP	HJ	400 m	110H	DT	PV	JT	1500 m	Final	Rank
Dominik Distelberger	Result	11.00	7.16	12.60	1.90	48.89	14.61 SB	43.66 SB	4.60	54.43 SB	DNS	DNF	
Dominik Distelberger	Points	861	852	643	714	866	897	739	790	654	DNS	DNF	

Women
Track and road

Athlete	Event	Heats		Semifinal		Final	
Athlete	Event	Result	Rank	Result	Rank	Result	Rank
Alexandra Toth	100 metres	11.69	18	did not advance			
Nada Pauer	5000 metres	—N/a				DQ	
Stephanie Bendrat	100 metres hurdles	Bye		13.43	23	did not advance	
Beate Schrott	100 metres hurdles	13.06 SB	4 Q	13.23	21	did not advance	

Combined events – Heptathlon

Athlete	Event	100H	HJ	SP	200 m	LJ	JT	800 m	Final	Rank
Ivona Dadic	Result	13.66	1.82 SB	14.06	23.61 PB	6.35 SB	47.42	2:11.87 SB	6552 NR	4
Ivona Dadic	Points	1027	1003	798	1018	959	810	937	6552 NR	4
Sarah Lagger	Result	14.46	1.76	13.54	25.16	6.14	45.30	2:13.14	6058	13
Sarah Lagger	Points	914	928	763	872	893	769	919	6058	13
Verena Preiner	Result	13.58	1.73 SB	13.76	24.12	6.09 PB	48.79 SB	2:11.29	6337 PB	8
Verena Preiner	Points	1039	891	778	969	877	837	946	6337 PB	8

== Cycling ==
=== Road ===
Men

Athlete	Event	Time	Rank
Matthias Brändle	Time trial	57:30.96	23
Matthias Krizek	Road race	5:52:34	28
Stephan Rabitsch	Road race	5:54:14	44

Women

Athlete	Event	Time	Rank
Sarah Rijkes	Road race	3:34:05	63
Martina Ritter	Road race	3:32:02	52
Martina Ritter	Time trial	44:23	11
Kathrin Schweinberger	Road race	DNF	

=== Track ===
Elimination race

Athlete	Event	Rank
Stefan Matzner	Men's elimination race	15

Madison

Athlete	Event	Qualifying		Final	
Athlete	Event	Points	Rank	Points	Rank
Andreas Graf; Andreas Müller	Men's madison	1	8 Q	5	8

Omnium

Athlete	Event	Scratch Race		Tempo Race		Elimination Race		Points Race		Total points	Rank
Athlete	Event	Rank	Points	Rank	Points	Rank	Points	Rank	Points	Total points	Rank
Stefan Matzner	Men's omnium	13	16	18	6	14	14	12	0	36	15
Verena Eberhardt	Women's omnium	16	10	15	12	15	12	7	20	54	14

Points race

Athlete	Event	Total points	Rank
Stefan Matzner	Men's points race	71	Bronze medal

Scratch

Athlete	Event	Laps down	Rank
Andreas Graf	Men's scratch	0	13
Verena Eberhardt	Women's scratch	0	12

== Golf ==
Doubles

Team	Event	Group Stage				Semifinal	Final / BM	
Team	Event	Opposition Score	Opposition Score	Opposition Score	Rank	Opposition Score	Opposition Score	Rank
Sarah Schober; Christine Wolf	Women's team	Finland; L 3 & 2	Great Britain 3 L 5 & 3	Iceland; D Halved	4	did not advance		

Foursome

Athlete	Event	Foursome 1	Foursome 2	Total		
Athlete	Event	Score	Score	Score	Par	Rank
Clemens Gaster; Bernard Neumayer; Sarah Schober; Christine Wolf	Mixed team	75	72	143	+3	7

== Gymnastics ==
=== Men ===
Team

Athlete	Event	Qualification								Final							
Athlete	Event	Apparatus						Total	Rank	Apparatus						Total	Rank
Athlete	Event	F	PH	R	V	PB	HB	Total	Rank	F	PH	R	V	PB	HB	Total	Rank
Vinzenz Höck	Team	—N/a		14.500	13.700	—N/a	10.000	—N/a									
Daniel Kopeinik	Team	12.333	12.866	—N/a				—N/a									
Severin Kranzlmüller	Team	11.833	13.000	12.133	—N/a	12.233	12.533	—N/a									
Johannes Mairoser	Team	12.433	12.700	—N/a	12.366	12.700	—N/a	—N/a									
Matthias Schwab	Team	—N/a		12.300	13.600	12.500	12.133	—N/a									
Total	Team	36.599	38.566	38.933	39.666	37.433	36.666	227.863	22	—N/a							

=== Women ===
Team

Athlete	Event	Qualification						Final					
Athlete	Event	Apparatus				Total	Rank	Apparatus				Total	Rank
Athlete	Event	V	UB	BB	F	Total	Rank	V	UB	BB	F	Total	Rank
Bianca Frysak	Team	—N/a	10.600	10.300	12.000	—N/a		did not advance					
Elisa Hämmerle	Team	—N/a	12.500	11.966	—N/a	—N/a		did not advance					
Jasmin Mader	Team	13.166	11.966	11.233	12.133	—N/a		did not advance					
Marlies Männersdorfer	Team	0.000	—N/a		11.400	—N/a		did not advance					
Alissa Mörz	Team	12.833	—N/a			—N/a		did not advance					
Total	Team	25.999	35.066	33.499	35.533	130.097	23	did not advance					

== Rowing ==
Men

Athlete	Event	Heats		Repechage		Semifinals		Final	
Athlete	Event	Time	Rank	Time	Rank	Time	Rank	Time	Rank
Ferdinand Querfeld; Rudolph Querfeld	Pair	7:11.53	5 R	6:38.80	4 FC	—N/a		6:39.71	14
Gabriel Hohensasser; Maximilian Kohlmayr; Christoph Seifriedsberger; Florian Walk	Four	6:08.74	5 R	6:02.32	3 FB	—N/a		6:07.66	8
Julian Schöberl; Paul Sieber	Lightweight double sculls	6:37.57	4 R	6:26.36	2 SF A/B	6:32.53	5 FB	6:29.79	11

Women

Athlete	Event	Heats		Repechage		Semifinals		Final	
Athlete	Event	Time	Rank	Time	Rank	Time	Rank	Time	Rank
Magdalena Lobnig	Single sculls	7:36.26	1 FA	—N/a				7:32.62	Silver medal
Anja Manoutschehri	Lightweight single sculls	8:09.50	4 R	7:52.48	3 FB	—N/a		7:49.34	7
Louisa Altenhuber; Laura Arndorfer	Lightweight double sculls	7:27.25	5 R	7:16.92	4 FB	—N/a		7:15.63	9

== Triathlon ==
Individual

Athlete	Event	Swim (1.5 km)	Trans 1	Bike (40 km)	Trans 2	Run (10 km)	Total Time	Rank
Lukas Hollaus	Men's	17:58	0:58	DNF				
Lukas Pertl	Men's	18:08	0:55	58:41	0:24	34:01	1:52:09	33
Therese Feuersinger	Women's	18:51	1:07	1:05:41	0:30	40:37	2:06:46	23
Julia Hauser	Women's	19:13	1:00	1:05:30	0:26	36:28	2:02:37	7

Relay

Athlete	Event	Swim (300 m)	Trans 1	Bike (6.8 km)	Trans 2	Run (2 km)	Total Group Time	Rank
Lukas Hollaus; Lukas Pertl; Therese Feuersinger; Julia Hauser	Mixed relay	15:03	3:04	36:37	2:20	20:31	1:17:26	11
