= Austria at the 2026 European Athletics Championships =

- Flag of Austria
- WA code: AUT

in Birmingham, United Kingdom 10–16 August 2026
- Competitors: 24 (10 men and 14 women)
- Medals: Gold 0 Silver 0 Bronze 0 Total 0

European Athletics Championships appearances
- 1934; 1938–1946; 1950; 1954; 1958; 1962; 1966; 1969; 1971; 1974; 1978; 1982; 1986; 1990; 1994; 1998; 2002; 2006; 2010; 2012; 2014; 2016; 2018; 2022; 2024; 2026

Austria competed at the 2026 European Athletics Championships in Birmingham, United Kingdom from 10–16 August 2026.

== Results ==
Austria entered the following athletes.

Key

- Q = Qualified for the next round
- q = Qualified for the next round as a fastest loser or, in field events, by position without achieving the qualifying target
- NR = National record
- PB = Personal best
- SB = Season best
- N/A = Round not applicable for the event

=== Men ===
Track and road events

Athlete	Event	Heat		Semifinal		Final	
Athlete	Event	Result	Rank	Result	Rank	Result	Rank
Markus Fuchs	100 m	10.76	23	Did not advance			
Raphael Pallitsch	1500 m	3:42.55	9	—N/a		Did not advance	
Andreas Vojta	Marathon	—N/a				2:15:34	26
Enzo Diessl	110 m hurdles	Bye		13.35	4 q	13.44	5
Leo Köhldorfer	400 m hurdles	51.02	23	Did not advance			
Niklas Strohmayer-Dangl	400 m hurdles	49.39	6 q	49.20	6	Did not advance	
Tobias Rattinger	3000 m steeplechase	8:47.91	11	—N/a		Did not advance	

Field events

Athlete	Event	Qualification		Final	
Athlete	Event	Distance	Position	Distance	Position
Endiorass Kingley	Triple jump	16.25	9 q	16.57	6
Will Dibo	Discus throw	55.31	27	Did not advance	
Lukas Weißhaidinger	Discus throw	65.06	4 q	63.80	10

=== Women ===
Track and road events

Athlete	Event	Heat		Semifinal		Final	
Athlete	Event	Result	Rank	Result	Rank	Result	Rank
Magdalena Lindner	100 m	11.32	14	Did not advance			
Isabel Posch	100 m	11.48	19	Did not advance			
Christania Williams	100 m	Bye		11.21	4	Did not advance	
Susanne Gogl-Walli	400 m	52.12	11 q	52.29	8	Did not advance	
Caroline Bredlinger	800 m	2:03.41	6	Did not advance			
Lisa Redlinger	5000 m	—N/a				15:57.19	17
Julia Mayer	Marathon	—N/a				2:28:23SB	10
Eva Wutti	Marathon	—N/a				2:47:29	45
Karin Strametz	100 m hurdles	13.10	17	Did not advance			
Anja Dlauhy	400 m hurdles	55.42	3 q	55.22	6	Did not advance	
Lena Pressler	400 m hurdles	54.97	1 q	1:01.85	7	Did not advance	
Theresia Emma Mohr	Half marathon walk	—N/a				1:40:59	22
Karin Strametz; Magdalena Lindner; Christania Williams; Isabel Posch	4 × 100 m relay	43.37	5	—N/a		Did not advance	

Combined events – Heptathlon

Athlete	Event	100H	HJ	SP	200 m	LJ	JT	800 m	Final	Rank
Verena Mayr	Result	14.27	1.71 =SB	14.63 =SB	25.53 SB	5.87 SB	42.10	2:14.16SB	5906	19
Verena Mayr	Points	941	867	836	839	810	708	905	5906	19
