= Austria at the 2016 European Athletics Championships =

- WA code: AUT
- National federation: ÖLV
- Website: www.oelv.at

in Amsterdam
- Competitors: 16 (8 men and 8 women) in 10 events
- Medals Ranked 27th: Gold 0 Silver 0 Bronze 1 Total 1

European Athletics Championships appearances
- 1934; 1938–1946; 1950; 1954; 1958; 1962; 1966; 1969; 1971; 1974; 1978; 1982; 1986; 1990; 1994; 1998; 2002; 2006; 2010; 2012; 2014; 2016; 2018; 2022; 2024

Austria competed at the 2016 European Athletics Championships in Amsterdam, Netherlands, between 6 and 10 July 2016.

== Medals ==
Medal	Name	Event	Date
Bronze	Ivona Dadic	Women's heptathlon	9 July

== Results ==
Men

Track & road events

Athlete	Event	Heat		Semifinal		Final	
Athlete	Event	Result	Rank	Result	Rank	Result	Rank
Markus Fuchs	100 m	10.56	22	did not advance			
Andreas Vojta	1500 m	3:46.32	30	—		did not advance	
Brenton Rowe	5000 m	—				13:58.96	15
Dominik Hufnagl	400 m hurdles	51.88	20	did not advance			
Edwin Kemboi	Half marathon	—				1:07:51	58
Lemawork Ketema	Half marathon	—				1:05:10	20
Valentin Pfeil	Half marathon	—				1:09:34	71

Combined events – Decathlon

Athlete	Event	100 m	LJ	SP	HJ	400 m	110H	DT	PV	JT	1500 m	Final	Rank
Dominik Distelberger	Result	10.91	7.20	13.05	1.86	DNS						DNF	
Dominik Distelberger	Points	881	862	670	679	—						DNF	

Women

Track & road events

Athlete	Event	Heat		Semifinal		Final	
Athlete	Event	Result	Rank	Result	Rank	Result	Rank
Stephanie Bendrat	100 m hurdles	13.17	10 q	14.00	23	did not advance	
Beate Schrott	100 m hurdles	DNS		did not advance			
Eva Wimberger	100 m hurdles	13.43	22	did not advance			
Anita Beierl	Half marathon	—				1:17:48	66
Andrea Mayr	Half marathon	—				1:13:49	30

Field Events

Athlete	Event	Qualification		Final	
Athlete	Event	Distance	Rank	Distance	Rank
Veronika Watzek	Discus throw	53.79	22	did not advance	

Combined events – Heptathlon

Athlete	Event	100H	HJ	SP	200 m	LJ	JT	800 m	Final	Rank
Ivona Dadic	Result	13.83	1.77 SB	14.10 PB	24.11 SB	6.32	47.92	2:12.83 SB	6408 NR	3rd place, bronze medalist(s)
Ivona Dadic	Points	1003	941	801	970	949	820	924	6408 NR	3rd place, bronze medalist(s)
Verena Preiner	Result	13.94 PB	1.71 PB	13.51	24.64	5.68	48.31 PB	2:12.03	6050 PB	7
Verena Preiner	Points	987	867	761	920	753	827	935	6050 PB	7
