= Austria at the 2022 European Athletics Championships =

- Flag of Austria
- WA code: AUT
- National federation: Austrian Athletics Federation

in Munich, Germany 15−21 August 2022
- Competitors: 14 (5 men and 9 women) in 14 events
- Medals: Gold 0 Silver 0 Bronze 0 Total 0

European Athletics Championships appearances
- 1934; 1938–1946; 1950; 1954; 1958; 1962; 1966; 1969; 1971; 1974; 1978; 1982; 1986; 1990; 1994; 1998; 2002; 2006; 2010; 2012; 2014; 2016; 2018; 2022; 2024; 2026

Austria competed at the 2022 European Athletics Championships in Munich, Germany, between 15 and 21 August 2022

== Results ==
Austria entered the following athletes.

Key

- Q = Qualified for the next round
- q = Qualified for the next round as a fastest loser or, in field events, by position without achieving the qualifying target
- NR = National record
- PB = Personal best
- SB = Season best
- N/A = Round not applicable for the event

=== Men ===
Track and road events

Athlete	Event	Heat		Semifinal		Final	
Athlete	Event	Result	Rank	Result	Rank	Result	Rank
Markus Fuchs	100 metres	Bye		10.42	23	did not advance	
Andreas Vojta	10,000 metres	—N/a				29:56.71	22
Niklas Strohmeyer-Dangl	400 metres hurdles	51.21	24	did not advance			

Field events

Athlete	Event	Qualification		Final	
Athlete	Event	Distance	Position	Distance	Position
Riccardo Klotz	Pole vault	5.30	21	did not advance	
Lukas Weißhaidinger	Discus throw	65.48	5 q	63.02	9

=== Women ===
Track and road events

Athlete	Event	Heat		Semifinal		Final	
Athlete	Event	Result	Rank	Result	Rank	Result	Rank
Magdalena Lindner	100 metres	11.58	16	did not advance			
Susanne Walli	200 metres	23.45	16 q	23.73	21	did not advance	
Susanne Walli	400 metres	51.73 SB	5 Q	52.58	20	did not advance	
Julia Mayer	10,000 metres	—N/a				33:57.29	18
Lena Pressler	400 metres hurdles	57.33	18	did not advance			
Lena Millonig	3000 metres steeplechase	9:57.50	19	—N/a		did not advance	
Magdalena Lindner; Lena Pressler; Viktoria Wallhuber; Susanne Walli	4 × 100 metres relay	DQ		—N/a		did not advance	

Field events

Athlete	Event	Qualification		Final	
Athlete	Event	Distance	Position	Distance	Position
Victoria Hudson	Javelin throw	60.49	5 q	56.07	10

Combined events – Heptathlon

Athlete	Event	100H	HJ	SP	200 m	LJ	JT	800 m	Final	Rank
Ivona Dadic	Result	13.70 SB	1.77 SB	14.31	DQ	DNS	DNF			
Ivona Dadic	Points	1021	941	815	0	DNS	DNF			
