= Austria at the 1934 European Athletics Championships =

- WA code: AUT
- National federation: ÖLV
- Website: www.oelv.at

in Turin
- Competitors: 6 (6 men) in 6 events
- Medals: Gold 0 Silver 0 Bronze 0 Total 0

European Athletics Championships appearances
- 1934; 1938–1946; 1950; 1954; 1958; 1962; 1966; 1969; 1971; 1974; 1978; 1982; 1986; 1990; 1994; 1998; 2002; 2006; 2010; 2012; 2014; 2016; 2018; 2022; 2024; 2026

Austria competed at the 1934 European Athletics Championships in Turin, Italy, between 7 and 9 September 1934.

== Results ==
Men

Track & road events

Athlete	Event	Heat		Semifinal		Final	
Athlete	Event	Result	Rank	Result	Rank	Result	Rank
Georg Puchberger	800 m	1:57.0	4	did not advance			
Georg Puchberger	1500 m	4:04.9	5	—N/a		did not advance	
Johann Langmayr	110 m hurdles	27.3	3 Q	30.	6	did not advance	
Ernst Leitner	110 m hurdles	15.2	2 Q	15.0	3 Q	DQ	–
Ernst Leitner	400 m hurdles	56.5	3 Q	—N/a		55.2 NR	5
Franz Tuschek	Marathon	—N/a				did not finish	
Rudolf Wöber	Marathon	—N/a				did not finish	

Field Events

Athlete	Event	Qualification		Final	
Athlete	Event	Distance	Rank	Distance	Rank
Emil Janausch	Discus throw	Bye		45.01	8
