= 2023 European Athletics Team Championships =

2023 European Team Championships
- Host city: Chorzów, Poland (all 3 divisions)
- Events: 37 + 1 team event
- Dates: 20–25 June 2023

The 2023 European Athletics Team Championships (ETC) in athletics was held at Stadion Śląski in Chorzów, Poland, from 20 to 25 June 2023.

The event was initially planned to be held in Madrid, but after European Athletics and European Olympic Committee reached an agreement, the event was added to the 2023 European Games programme and moved to Poland. Madrid would later co-host the 2025 ETC.

Unlike previous editions, individual gold, silver and bronze medals were awarded in addition to the medals and cup in the teams competition as part of the 2023 European Games program. The individual medals were decided on best performances across all three divisions, and the winners and medalists in the individual events were considered as European Games medalists, rather than Team Championships medalists - only the members of the first three teams in the First Division table received Team Championships medals. Within the Championships, events from 100 metres to 800 metres were run in two heats, with times combined into a single table for the purposes of both points in the Team Championships and medal placings in the European Games. Officials have indicated that the 16-team version of the Team Championships will become a permanent inclusion in the European Games program, returning in 2027, while stand alone team events will be held in the middle year of the European Games cycle (with the next inter-Games event in Madrid in 2025).

In addition to prizes and medals, the three highest teams in the second and third divisions shall be promoted for the next edition of the championships, and the bottom three teams of the first and second division relegated.

== Format change ==
The competition consisted of three divisions, instead of four leagues, based on the results of the 2021 Championships. 1st Division competed in the evening sessions of 23–25 June, while 3rd Division in the morning sessions and the 2nd Division in the evening sessions of 20–22 June.

There were only 37 events in 2023 and not 40 as before: the 4 × 400 m relays, both male and female, were cancelled and replaced by a newly introduced mixed relay which concluded the championships.

As a result of the 2022 Russian invasion of Ukraine, teams from Russia and Belarus were banned from competing at the 2023 European Team Championships.

== Schedule ==
The overall schedule of the championships was as follows.

=== Calendar ===
Within the 2023 European Games

OC	Opening ceremony	●	Event competitions	1	Individual event finals	CC	Closing ceremony

June/July	20th Tue	21st Wed	22nd Thu	23rd Fri	24th Sat	25th Sun	26th Mon	27th Tue	28th Wed	29th Thu	30th Fri	1st Sat	2nd Sun	Total events
Ceremonies		OC											CC	
Athletics EA Team Championships	●	●	●	12	13	12								37+ 1 Team
Athletics EA Team Championships	Third Division (morning)			First Division (all day)										37+ 1 Team
Athletics EA Team Championships	Second Division (evening)			First Division (all day)										37+ 1 Team

== Medal table ==
* Host nation (Poland)

Rank	Nation	Gold	Silver	Bronze	Total
1	Italy	7	5	3	15
2	Netherlands	4	2	4	10
3	Germany	4	1	1	6
4	Poland*	3	5	1	9
5	Ukraine	3	1	2	6
6	Spain	3	0	2	5
7	Switzerland	2	0	2	4
8	Latvia	2	0	0	2
9	Romania	1	2	1	4
10	Czech Republic	1	2	0	3
10	Portugal	1	2	0	3
10	Slovenia	1	2	0	3
13	France	1	1	4	6
14	Greece	1	1	0	2
15	Finland	1	0	1	2
15	Norway	1	0	1	2
17	Albania	1	0	0	1
17	Serbia	1	0	0	1
19	Sweden	0	3	1	4
20	Turkey	0	2	2	4
21	Belgium	0	2	1	3
22	Cyprus	0	2	0	2
23	Lithuania	0	1	3	4
24	Croatia	0	1	0	1
24	Estonia	0	1	0	1
24	Hungary	0	1	0	1
24	Luxembourg	0	1	0	1
28	Great Britain	0	0	5	5
29	Slovakia	0	0	2	2
30	Austria	0	0	1	1
30	Ireland	0	0	1	1
Totals (31 entries)		38	38	38	114

== 2023 European Games individual medalists ==
The medalists are awarded their medals at the conclusion of the First Division contest. Athletes are eligible in all three divisions.

=== Men ===
Event	Gold		Silver		Bronze	
100 m	Samuele Ceccarelli; Italy	10.13	Raphael Bouju; Netherlands	10.14	Jeremiah Azu; Great Britain	10.16
200 m	Ryan Zeze; France	20.29	Albert Komański; Poland	20.50	Ján Volko; Slovakia	20.53 SB
400 m	Håvard Bentdal Ingvaldsen; Norway	44.88 CR	João Coelho; Portugal	45.05 NR	Liemarvin Bonevacia; Netherlands	45.06 SB
800 m	Ramon Wipfli; Switzerland	1:46.73 PB	Filip Šnejdr; Czech Republic	1:46.84	Mehmet Çelik; Turkey	1:46.84 PB
1500 m	Mohamed Katir; Spain	3:36.95 CR	Isaac Nader; Portugal	3:37.37	Niels Laros; Netherlands	3:37.59
5000 m	Thierry Ndikumwenayo; Spain	13:25.48	Andreas Almgren; Sweden	13:25.70 SB	Yemaneberhan Crippa; Italy	13:34.29 SB
3000 m steeplechase	Daniel Arce; Spain	8:25.88	Emil Blomberg; Sweden	8:26.27	Zak Seddon; Great Britain	8:27.42
110 m hurdles	Jason Joseph; Switzerland	13.12 CR	Milan Trajkovic; Cyprus	13.38 SB	Enrique Llopis; Spain	13.44
400 m hurdles	Alessandro Sibilio; Italy	48.14 CR	Rasmus Mägi; Estonia	48.63 SB	İsmail Nezir; Turkey	48.84 EU23L
4 × 100 m	Germany; Julian Wagner; Marvin Schulte; Joshua Hartmann; Yannick Wolf	38.34 SB	Italy; Lorenzo Patta; Samuele Ceccarelli; Marco Ricci; Filippo Tortu	38.47 SB	France; Dylan Rigot; Jeff Erius; Ryan Zeze; Jimmy Vicaut	38.51 SB
High jump	Gianmarco Tamberi; Italy	2.29 SB	Thomas Carmoy; Belgium	2.29 =PB	Norbert Kobielski; Poland	2.26
Pole vault	Menno Vloon; Netherlands	5.85	Emmanouil Karalis; Greece	5.80	Thibaut Collet; France	5.80
Long jump	Miltiadis Tentoglou; Greece	8.34 EL	Mattia Furlani; Italy	7.97	Simon Ehammer; Switzerland	7.95
Triple jump	Tobia Bocchi; Italy	16.84	Necati Er; Turkey	16.71 SB	Vladyslav Shepeliev; Ukraine	16.67 EU23L
Shot put	Zane Weir; Italy	21.59	Filip Mihaljević; Croatia	21.33	Scott Lincoln; Great Britain	21.10 SB
Discus throw	Kristjan Čeh; Slovenia	69.94 CR	Daniel Ståhl; Sweden	67.25	Andrius Gudžius; Lithuania	64.94
Hammer throw	Wojciech Nowicki; Poland	79.61	Mykhaylo Kokhan; Ukraine	77.03 SB	Thomas Mardal; Norway	76.50
Javelin throw	Julian Weber; Germany	86.26	Edis Matusevičius; Lithuania	84.22 SB	Artur Felfner; Ukraine	82.24 EU23L

=== Mixed ===
Event	Gold		Silver		Bronze	
4 × 400 m	Czech Republic; Matěj Krsek; Tereza Petržilková; Vít Müller; Lada Vondrová	3:12.34 CR	Poland; Maksymilian Szwed; Anna Kielbasinska; Igor Bogaczyński; Natalia Kaczmarek	3:12.87 SB	Belgium; Jonathan Sacoor; Camille Laus; Dylan Borlée; Cynthia Bolingo	3:12.97 SB

=== Women ===
Event	Gold		Silver		Bronze	
100 m	Ewa Swoboda; Poland	11.09 CR	Rani Rosius; Belgium	11.20 =PB	N'Ketia Seedo; Netherlands	11.24
200 m	Lieke Klaver; Netherlands	22.46 PB	Olivia Fotopoulou; Cyprus	22.71 PB	Bianca Williams; Great Britain	22.75 SB
400 m	Femke Bol; Netherlands	49.82 CR	Natalia Kaczmarek; Poland	50.34	Andrea Miklós; Romania	50.67 PB
800 m	Natalia Krol; Ukraine	1:59.77 SB	Bianka Kéri; Hungary	1:59.80 PB	Gabriela Gajanová; Slovakia	1:59.92
1500 m	Claudia Mihaela Bobocea; Romania	4:08.68	Vera Hoffmann; Luxembourg	4:08.78	Gabija Galvydytė; Lithuania	4:09.48 PB
5000 m	Agate Caune; Latvia	15:15.21	Nadia Battocletti; Italy	15:25.09	Hannah Nuttall; Great Britain	15:29.49
3000 m steeplechase	Luiza Gega; Albania	9:17:31 CR	Maruša Mišmaš-Zrimšek; Slovenia	9:23.41	Greta Karinauskaitė; Lithuania	9:28.48
100 m hurdles	Pia Skrzyszowska; Poland	12.77 EU23L	Nadine Visser; Netherlands	12.81	Sarah Lavin; Ireland	12.82 SB
400 m hurdles	Carolina Krafzik; Germany	54.47 SB	Ayomide Folorunso; Italy	54.79 SB	Cathelijn Peeters; Netherlands	54.97
4 × 100 m	Netherlands; N'Ketia Seedo; Lieke Klaver; Jamile Samuel; Tasa Jiya	42.61 EL	Poland; Marika Popowicz-Drapała; Monika Romaszko; Magdalena Stefanowicz; Ewa Swoboda	42.97 SB	Spain; Carmen Marco; Paula García; Paula Sevilla; Jaël Bestué	43.13 SB
High jump	Yaroslava Mahuchikh; Ukraine	1.97	Daniela Stanciu; Romania	1.94	Nawal Meniker; France	1.92
Pole vault	Wilma Murto; Finland	4.71	Tina Šutej; Slovenia	4.70	Angelica Moser; Switzerland	4.60
Long jump	Milica Gardašević; Serbia	6.82	Hilary Kpatcha; France	6.75	Larissa Iapichino; Italy	6.66
Triple jump	Maryna Bekh-Romanchuk; Ukraine	14.58	Tuğba Danışmaz; Turkey	14.16 NR	Ottavia Cestonaro; Italy	14.09
Shot put	Auriol Dongmo; Portugal	19.07	Yemisi Ogunleye; Germany	18.85	Axelina Johansson; Sweden	18.32
Discus throw	Kristin Pudenz; Germany	66.84 SB	Daisy Osakue; Italy	64.35	Melina Robert-Michon; France	64.21
Hammer throw	Sara Fantini; Italy	73.26 =SB	Bianca Ghelber; Romania	72.97	Silja Kosonen; Finland	72.34
Javelin throw	Līna Mūze; Latvia	62.38	Nikola Ogrodníková; Czech Republic	61.75 SB	Victoria Hudson; Austria	60.27

== 2023 European Athletics Team Championships - overall tables ==
The overall medalists in the 2023 Team Championships :

Games	Gold	Silver	Bronze
First Division	Italy	Poland	Germany

The top three in the other divisions were :

Games	First	Second	Third
Second Division	Hungary	Ukraine	Lithuania
Third Division	Ireland	Austria	Israel

First Division

Final standings:

Rank	Nation	Points	EW
1	Italy	426.50	7
2	Poland	402.50	4
3	Germany	387.50	4
4	Spain	352.00	4
5	Great Britain	341.00	0
6	Netherlands	339.50	4
7	France	337.50	3
8	Portugal	315.00	1
9	Czech Republic	303.50	2
10	Sweden	283.00	1
11	Finland	282.50	1
12	Switzerland	263.00	3
13	Greece	256.50	1
14	Belgium	250.00	0
15	Turkey	245.00	1
16	Norway	223.00	1

Second division

Final standings:

Rank	Nation	Points	EW
1	Hungary	456.50	5
2	Ukraine	435.50	7
3	Lithuania	372.50	1
4	Slovenia	372.00	4
5	Romania	344.00	3
6	Denmark	312.00	1
7	Serbia	307.00	3
8	Slovakia	302.00	2
9	Croatia	301.50	4
10	Estonia	298.50	1
11	Bulgaria	298.50	1
12	Cyprus	288.00	2
13	Latvia	283.50	2
14	Iceland	246.50	0
15	Luxembourg	198.00	1
16	Moldova	170.00	0

Third division

Final standings:

Rank	Nation	Points	EW
1	Ireland	494	14
2	Austria	473.5	9
3	Israel	434	1
4	Bosnia and Herzegovina	363	2
5	Malta	352.5	1
6	Georgia	290	1
7	Andorra	269	1
8	Montenegro	258	1
9	Albania	257	3
10	Armenia	255	1
11	North Macedonia	235	1
12	San Marino	192	
13	Azerbaijan	189	2
14	Kosovo	150	
15	Liechtenstein	32	

: European Athletics Team Champion : silver medalist : bronze medalist
: Divisional winner and promoted : promoted : relegated

=== First Division ===
==== Participating countries ====
- Belgium
- Czech Republic
- Finland
- France
- Germany
- Great Britain
- Greece
- Italy
- Netherlands
- Norway
- Poland
- Portugal
- Spain
- Sweden
- Switzerland
- Turkey

==== First Division: Individual results ====
No medals are awarded within the individual matches of the Championship, but the following list summarises the podium placings in each match event. Full results can be found on the main article.

Men

Event	First		Second		Third	
100 m	Samuele Ceccarelli; Italy	10.13	Raphael Bouju; Netherlands	10.14	Jeremiah Azu; Great Britain	10.16
200 m	Ryan Zeze; France	20.29	Albert Komański; Poland	20.50	Filippo Tortu; Italy	20.61
400 m	Håvard Bentdal Ingvaldsen; Norway	44.88 CR	João Coelho; Portugal	45.05 NR	Liemarvin Bonavecia; Netherlands	45.06 SB
800 m	Ramon Wipfli; Switzerland	1:46.73 PB	Filip Šnejdr; Czech Republic	1:46.84	Mehmet Çelik; Turkey	1:46.84 PB
1500 m	Mohamed Katir; Spain	3:36.95 CR	Isaac Nader; Portugal	3:37.37	Niels Laros; Netherlands	3:37.59
5000 m	Thierry Ndikumwenayo; Spain	13:25.48	Andreas Almgren; Sweden	13:25.70 SB	Yemaneberhan Crippa; Italy	13:25.70 SB
3000 m steeplechase	Daniel Arce; Spain	8:25.88	Emil Blomberg; Sweden	8:26.27	Zak Seddon; Great Britain	8:27.42
110 m hurdles	Jason Joseph; Switzerland	13.12 CR	Enrique Llopis; Spain	13.44	Hassane Fofana; Italy	13.47
400 m hurdles	Alessandro Sibilio; Italy	48.14 CR	İsmail Nezir; Turkey	48.84 EU23L	Nick Smidt; Netherlands	48.95
4 × 100 m	Germany; Julian Wagner; Marvin Schulte; Joshua Hartmann; Yannick Wolf	38.34 SB	Italy; Lorenzo Patta; Samuele Ceccarelli; Marco Ricci; Filippo Tortu	38.47 SB	France; Dylan Rigot; Jeff Erius; Ryan Zeze; Jimmy Vicaut	38.51 SB
High jump	Gianmarco Tamberi; Italy	2.29 SB	Thomas Carmoy; Belgium	2.29 =PB	Norbert Kobielski; Poland	2.26
Pole vault	Menno Vloon; Netherlands	5.85	Emmanouil Karalis; Greece	5.80	Thibaut Collet; France	5.80
Long jump	Miltiadis Tentoglou; Greece	8.34 EL	Mattia Furlani; Italy	7.97	Simon Ehammer; Switzerland	7.95
Triple jump	Tobia Bocchi; Italy	16.84	Necati Er; Turkey	16.71 SB	Dimitrios Tsiamis; Greece	16.38
Shot put	Zane Weir; Italy	21.59	Scott Lincoln; Great Britain	21.10 SB	Michał Haratyk; Poland	20.89
Discus throw	Daniel Ståhl; Sweden	67.25	Henrik Janssen; Germany	64.09	Robert Urbanek; Poland	61.97
Hammer throw	Wojciech Nowicki; Poland	79.61	Thomas Mardal; Norway	76.50	Michail Anastasakis; Greece	74.12
Javelin throw	Julian Weber; Germany	86.26	Timothy Herman; Belgium	81.67	Leandro Ramos; Portugal	81.62 SB

Mixed

Event	First		Second		Third	
4 × 400 m	Czech Republic	3:12.34 CR	Poland	3:12.87 SB	Belgium	3:12.97 SB

Women

Event	First		Second		Third	
100 m	Ewa Swoboda; Poland	11.09 CR	Rani Rosius; Belgium	11.20 =PB	N'Ketia Seedo; Netherlands	11.24
200 m	Lieke Klaver; Netherlands	22.46 PB	Bianca Williams; Great Britain	22.75 SB	Polyniki Emmanouilidou; Greece	22.85 PB
400 m	Femke Bol; Netherlands	49.82 CR	Natalia Kaczmarek; Poland	50.34	Cynthia Bolingo; Belgium	50.95 SB
800 m	Audrey Werro; Switzerland	1:59.95	Isabelle Boffey; Great Britain	2:00.39	Majtie Kolberg; Germany	2:00.72
1500 m	Esther Guerrero; Spain	4:11.77	Martyna Galant; Poland	4:11.78	Hanna Klein; Germany	4:12.14
5000 m	Nadia Battocletti; Italy	15:25.09	Hannah Nuttall; Great Britain	15:29.49	Águeda Marqués; Spain	15:31.04
3000 m steeplechase	Alicja Konieczek; Poland	9:38.72	Flavie Renouard; France	9:40.40	Marta Serrano; Spain	9:41.86
100 m hurdles	Pia Skrzyszowska; Poland	12.77 EU23L	Nadine Visser; Netherlands	12.81	Laeticia Bapté; France	12.82
400 m hurdles	Carolina Krafzik; Germany	54.47 SB	Ayomide Folorunso; Italy	54.79 SB	Cathelijn Peeters; Netherlands	54.97
4 × 100 m	Netherlands; N'Ketia Seedo; Lieke Klaver; Jamile Samuel; Tasa Jiya	42.61 EL	Poland; Marika Popowicz-Drapała; Monika Romaszko; Magdalena Stefanowicz; Ewa Swoboda	42.97 SB	Spain; Carmen Marco; Paula García; Paula Sevilla; Jaël Bestué	43.13 SB
High jump	Nawal Meniker; France	1.92	Merel Maes; Belgium	1.92 =PB	Michaela Hrubá; Czech Republic	1.90 SB
Pole vault	Wilma Murto; Finland	4.71	Angelica Moser; Switzerland	4.60	Amálie Švábíková; Czech Republic	4.60
Long jump	Hilary Kpatcha; France	6.75	Larissa Iapichino; Italy	6.66	Fátima Diame; Spain	6.56
Triple jump	Tuğba Danışmaz; Turkey	14.16 NR	Ottavia Cestonaro; Italy	14.09	Maja Åskag; Sweden	13.88
Shot put	Auriol Dongmo; Portugal	19.07	Yemisi Ogunleye; Germany	18.85	Axelina Johansson; Sweden	18.32
Discus throw	Kristin Pudenz; Germany	66.84 SB	Daisy Osakue; Italy	64.35	Melina Robert-Michon; France	64.21
Hammer throw	Sara Fantini; Italy	73.26 =SB	Silja Kosonen; Finland	72.34	Malwina Kopron; Poland	71.18
Javelin throw	Nikola Ogrodníková; Czech Republic	61.75 SB	Christin Hussong; Germany	60.05 SB	Bekah Walton; Great Britain	59.76 PB

==== Score table ====
Event		BEL	CZE	FIN	FRA	GER	GBR	GRE	ITA	NED	NOR	POL	POR	ESP	SWE	SUI	TUR
100 metres	M	3	4	6	9	12	14	11	16	15	1	13	7	5	2	10	8
100 metres	W	15	7	6	2	8	11	10	5	14	4	16	9	13	3	12	1
200 metres	M	2	8	9	16	10	5.5	7	14	13	3	15	5.5	11	1	12	4
200 metres	W	7	6	1	10	3	15	14	12	16	5	13	11	8	9	4	2
400 metres	M	6	8	4	11	13	12	1	9	14	16	5	15	10	2	7	3
400 metres	W	14	12	5	6	7	13	1	11	16	10	15	9	3	4	8	2
800 metres	M	2	15	3	8	4	11	5	6	13	1	10	7	9	12	16	14
800 metres	W	8	2	13	10.5	14	15	7	10.5	1	5	3	9	12	6	16	4
1500 metres	M	7	8	6	9	2	12	1	13	14	4	10	15	16	11	3	5
1500 metres	W	6	11	3	9	14	4	1	13	7	2	15	10	16	8	12	5
5000 metres	M	8	4	7	13	5	12	2	14	6	11	9	1	16	15	3	10
5000 metres	W	7	2	10	9	12	15	3	16	1	13	8	11	14	6	5	4
3000 metre steeplechase	M	9	8	7	4	12	14	2	13	6	11	5	3	16	15	10	0
3000 metre steeplechase	W	1	7	2	15	11	3	5	10	9	4	16	12	14	6	8	13
110 metre hurdles 100 metre hurdles	M	3	1	10	13	9	12	5	14	4	2	8	6	15	11	16	7
110 metre hurdles 100 metre hurdles	W	2	9	13	14	8	4	10	12	15	6	16	5	11	3	0	7
400 metre hurdles	M	12	9	7	6	0	13	3	16	14	0	10	4	5	8	11	15
400 metre hurdles	W	0	11	13	6	16	12	8	15	14	4	7	10	5	9	3	2
4 × 100 metres relay	M	7	9	0	14	16	0	8	15	13	0	11	6	12	5	4	10
4 × 100 metres relay	W	9	7	0	11	13	0	10	5	16	0	15	8	14	0	12	6
4 × 400 metres relay	X	14	16	1	13	11	8	2	12	3	7	15	10	6	5	9	4
High jump	M	15	12	8.5	4.5	13	3	7	16	8.5	1	14	10	4.5	6	2	11
High jump	W	15	14	7	16	12	2	11	4.5	6	1	8	9	4.5	3	10	13
Pole vault	M	7	3.5	8	14	10.5	3.5	15	12	16	9	13	10.5	1	2	5	6
Pole vault	W	13	14	16	8.5	10	12	8.5	6.5	5	11	6.5	1	4	3	15	2
Long jump	M	3	7	11	0	6	8	16	15	9	10	4	5	12	13	14	2
Long jump	W	5	7	9	16	13	11	6	15	12	8	3	1	14	10	4	2
Triple jump	M	2	3	10	11	1	12	14	16	6	4	9	13	8	7	5	15
Triple jump	W	3	9	12	6	13	2	7	15	4	8	11	5	10	14	1	16
Shot put	M	1	13	2	10	8	15	6	16	4	11	14	9	12	7	5	3
Shot put	W	10	8	11	4	15	2	3	6	13	1	12	16	5	14	9	7
Discus throw	M	2	11	4	7	15	12	1	10	5	8	14	9	13	16	3	6
Discus throw	W	3	5	9	14	16	11	2	15	8	10	7	13	4	12	1	6
Hammer throw	M	2	9	12	0	13	10	14	6	3	15	16	11	5	8	4	7
Hammer throw	W	10	2	15	7	11	13	6	16	3	8	14	4	9	12	1	5
Javelin throw	M	15	6	9	4	16	5	12	3	7	1	13	14	10	11	2	8
Javelin throw	W	2	16	13	7	15	14	12	3	6	8	9	11	5	4	1	10
Country		BEL	CZE	FIN	FRA	GER	GBR	GRE	ITA	NED	NOR	POL	POR	ESP	SWE	SUI	TUR
Total		250	303.5	282.5	337.5	387.5	341	256.5	426.5	339.5	223	402.5	315	352	283	263	245

=== Second Division ===
==== Participating countries ====
- Bulgaria
- Croatia
- Cyprus
- Denmark
- Estonia
- Hungary
- Iceland
- Latvia
- Lithuania
- Luxembourg
- Moldova
- Romania
- Serbia
- Slovakia
- Slovenia
- Ukraine

==== Second Division: Individual results ====
No medals are awarded within the individual matches of the Championship, but the following list summarises the podium placings in each match event. Full results can be found on the main article.

Men

Event	First		Second		Third	
100 m	Ján Volko; Slovakia	10.24 SB	Karl Erik Nazarov; Estonia	10.29	Anej Čurin Prapotnik; Slovenia	10.34
200 m	Ján Volko; Slovakia	20.53 SB	Gediminas Truskauskas; Lithuania	20.60 SB	Oskars Grava; Latvia	20.87 PB
400 m	Attila Molnár; Hungary	45.30	Oleksandr Pohorilko; Ukraine	45.31 PB	Mihai Sorin Dringo; Romania	45.76 SB
800 m	Marino Bloudek; Croatia	1:47.11	Dániel Huller; Hungary	1:47.11	Oleh Myronets; Ukraine	1:47.86 PB
1500 m	Elzan Bibić; Serbia	3:41.35	Charles Grethen; Luxembourg	3:41.76	Kristian Uldbjerg Hansen; Denmark	3:41.87
5000 m	Elzan Bibić; Serbia	13:53.95 SB	Amine Khadiri; Cyprus	13:54.71 PB	Ivo Balabanov; Bulgaria	13:56.99 SB
3000 m steeplechase	István Palkovits; Hungary	8:43.82	Ivo Balabanov; Bulgaria	8:47.69 SB	Jakob Dybdal Abrahamsen; Denmark	8:53.86
110 m hurdles	Milan Trajkovic; Cyprus	13.38 SB	Bálint Szeles; Hungary	13.68	Alin Ionuț Anton; Romania	13.80
400 m hurdles	Rasmus Mägi; Estonia	48.63 SB	Matic Ian Guček; Slovenia	49.48 EU23L	Matej Baluch; Slovakia	49.56 PB
4 × 100 m	Ukraine	39.03 SB	Slovenia	39.29 SB	Hungary	39.67 SB
High jump	Tihomir Ivanov; Bulgaria	2.24 SB	Slavko Stević; Serbia	2.24 PB	Oleh Doroshchuk; Ukraine	2.24
Pole vault	Ivan Horvat; Croatia	5.40	Vladislav Malykhin; Ukraine	5.40	Eerik Haamer; Estonia	5.30 SB
Long jump	Marko Čeko; Croatia	7.86 SB	Marius Vedeikis; Lithuania	7.80 =PB	Bozhidar Sarâboyukov; Bulgaria	7.78
Triple jump	Vladyslav Shepeliev; Ukraine	16.67 EU23L	Daniel Ingi Egilsson; Iceland	15.82	Lâchezar Vâlchev; Bulgaria	15.57
Shot put	Filip Mihaljevic; Croatia	21.33	Roman Kokoshko; Ukraine	20.46	Armin Sinančević; Serbia	20.42
Discus throw	Kristjan Čeh; Slovenia	69.94 CR	Andrius Gudžius; Lithuania	64.94	Guðni Valur Guðnason; Iceland	63.34
Hammer throw	Mykhaylo Kokhan; Ukraine	77.03 SB	Donát Varga; Hungary	73.75	Adam Kelly; Estonia	73.08 SB
Javelin throw	Edis Matusevičius; Lithuania	84.22 SB	Artur Felfner; Ukraine	82.24 EU23L	Andrian Mardare; Moldova	80.16

Mixed

Event	First		Second		Third	
4 × 400 m	Slovenia	3:14.72 WL	Romania	3:14.83 SB	Ukraine	3:15.13 SB

Women

Event	First		Second		Third	
100 m	Patrizia van der Weken; Luxembourg	11.24	Olivia Fotopoulou; Cyprus	11.34 PB	Boglárka Takács; Hungary	11.36
200 m	Olivia Fotopoulou; Cyprus	22.71 PB	Patrizia Van Der Weken; Luxembourg	23.19 NR	Alexa Sulyán; Hungary	23.25
400 m	Andrea Miklós; Romania	50.67 PB	Modesta Morauskaitė; Lithuania	51.61 SB	Janka Molnár; Hungary	51.74 NU23R
800 m	Natalia Krol; Ukraine	1:59.77 SB	Bianka Kéri; Hungary	1.59.80 PB	Gabriela Gajanová; Slovakia	1:59.92
1500 m	Claudia Mihaela Bobocea; Romania	4:08.68	Vera Hoffmann; Luxembourg	4:08.78	Gabija Galvydytė; Lithuania	4:09.48 PB
5000 m	Agate Caune; Latvia	15:15.21	Klara Lukan; Slovenia	15:33.39	Viktória Wagner-Gyürkés; Hungary	15:34.70
3000 m steeplechase	Maruša Mišmaš-Zrimšek; Slovenia	9:23.41	Greta Karinauskaitė; Lithuania	9:28.48	Juliane Hvid; Denmark	9:36.98 PB
100 m hurdles	Luca Kozák; Hungary	12.89 SB	Mette Graversgaard; Denmark	12.95	Natalia Christofi; Cyprus	13.05
400 m hurdles	Viktoriya Tkachuk; Ukraine	55.87	Agata Zupin; Slovenia	56.58	Janka Molnár; Hungary	56.86
4 × 100 m	Hungary	43.49 NR	Denmark	43.89 SB	Lithuania	44.06 SB
High jump	Yaroslava Mahuchikh; Ukraine	1.97	Daniela Stanciu; Romania	1.94	Angelina Topić; Serbia	1.91
Pole vault	Tina Šutej; Slovenia	4.70	Hanga Klekner; Hungary	4.45 =PB	Caroline Bonde Holm; Denmark	4.35
Long jump	Milica Gardašević; Serbia	6.82	Alina Rotaru-Kottmann; Romania	6.63	Jogailė Petrokaitė; Lithuania	6.60 SB
Triple jump	Maryna Bekh-Romanchuk; Ukraine	14.58	Rūta Kate Lasmane; Latvia	13.86	Alexandra Nacheva; Bulgaria	13.67 SB
Shot put	Anita Márton; Hungary	17.74	Dimitriana Bezede; Moldova	17.27	Erna Sóley Gunnarsdóttir; Iceland	16.93
Discus throw	Lisa Brix Petersen; Denmark	59.20	Ieva Zarankaitė; Lithuania	57.71	Marija Tolj; Croatia	57.06
Hammer throw	Bianca Florentina Ghelber; Romania	72.97	Réka Gyurátz; Hungary	67.15	Katrine Koch Jacobsen; Denmark	67.10
Javelin throw	Līna Mūze; Latvia	62.38	Gedly Tugi; Estonia	60.19 PB	Sara Kolak; Croatia	59.62 SB

==== Score table ====
Event		BUL	CRO	CYP	DEN	EST	HUN	ISL	LAT	LTU	LUX	MDA	ROU	SRB	SVK	SLO	UKR
100 metres	M	6	3	8	11	15	5	10	7	4	2	1	9	12	16	14	13
100 metres	W	4	5	15	2	10	14	6	7	8	16	1	3	13	12	9	11
200 metres	M	8	2	3	7	12	13	11	14	15	4	5	6	10	16	0	9
200 metres	W	7	4	16	11	9	14	3	12	6	15	1	8	10	2	5	13
400 metres	M	6	7	4	13	3	16	1	9	10	2	5	14	12	8	11	15
400 metres	W	9	10	6	1	5	14	2	12	15	4	3	16	8	7	13	11
800 metres	M	10	16	11	4	2	15	5	8	9	7	1	12	3	6	13	14
800 metres	W	7	8	1	11	6	15	9	3	13	4	2	12	5	14	10	16
1500 metres	M	4	3	1	14	2	12	11	10	13	15	6	8	16	7	5	9
1500 metres	W	5	9	6	12	7	11	2	1	14	15	3	16	4	8	10	13
5000 metres	M	14	2	15	12	9	8	6	3	7	10	5	4	16	13	0	11
5000 metres	W	10	12	2	11	4	14	8	16	5	3	6	7	1	9	15	13
3000 metre steeplechase	M	15	13	3	14	4	16	5	12	6	11	2	10	1	8	7	9
3000 metre steeplechase	W	6	3	5	14	11	0	10	9	15	4	12	0	7	8	16	13
110 metre hurdles 100 metre hurdles	M	13	7	16	6	8	15	3	4	5	11	0	14	12	2	10	9
110 metre hurdles 100 metre hurdles	W	4	7	14	15	8	16	1	5	3	6	2	9	11	13	10	12
400 metre hurdles	M	2	3	7	5	16	10	11	6	12	0	4	8	13	14	15	9
400 metre hurdles	W	11	8	10	12	0	14	3	4	7	5	9	2	6	13	15	16
4 × 100 metres relay	M	9	3	6	0	13	14	7	11	8	4	0	12	10	5	15	16
4 × 100 metres relay	W	9	8	12	15	13	16	7	0	14	0	6	0	0	11	10	0
4 × 400 metres relay	X	7	9	4	5	11	12	1	6	13	3	2	15	8	10	16	14
High jump	M	16	4	13	8	9.5	11.5	5	2.5	11.5	6	1	7	15	2.5	9.5	14
High jump	W	4.5	8	12	7	9	10	4.5	6	13	2	1	15	14	3	11	16
Pole vault	M	12	15.5	0	8	14	11	4	13	6	5	0	7	3	9.5	9.5	15.5
Pole vault	W	10	12	9	14	0	15	8	11	0	0	0	7	5	6	16	13
Long jump	M	14	16	8	4	7	12	9	5	15	3	2	13	11	0	6	10
Long jump	W	12	6	11	4	5	13	8	10	14	2	3	15	16	9	7	0
Triple jump	M	14	4	7	1	9	11	15	12	6	3	13	10	2	5	8	16
Triple jump	W	14	11	3	5	4	8	7	15	13	0	9	12	0	6	10	16
Shot put	M	1	16	3	4	10	8	9	5	6	12	2	13	14	7	11	15
Shot put	W	8	7	9	10	11	16	14	13	12	2	15	1	6	3	5	4
Discus throw	M	2	11	7	6	0	10	14	8	15	9	4	12	3	5	16	13
Discus throw	W	3	14	11	16	7	12	5	2	15	1	6	9	10	4	13	8
Hammer throw	M	8	13	12	4	14	15	0	3	9	2	10	5	7	11	6	16
Hammer throw	W	2	5	11	14	10	15	7	1	8	3	13	16	6	12	4	9
Javelin throw	M	8	3	5	9	6	13	7	2	16	1	14	12	4	10	11	15
Javelin throw	W	4	14	2	3	15	12	8	16	11	6	1	5	13	7	10	9
Country		BUL	CRO	CYP	DEN	EST	HUN	ISL	LAT	LTU	LUX	MDA	ROU	SRB	SVK	SLO	UKR
Total		298.5	301.5	288	312	298.5	456.5	246.5	283.5	372.5	198	170	344	307	302	372	435.5

=== Third Division ===
==== Participating countries ====
- Albania
- Andorra
- Armenia
- Austria
- Azerbaijan
- Bosnia and Herzegovina
- Georgia
- Ireland
- Israel
- Kosovo
- Liechtenstein*
- Malta
- North Macedonia
- Montenegro
- San Marino

(*) Liechtenstein typically competes as part of the Athletic Association of Small States of Europe (AASSE) team, alongside athletes from Gibraltar and Monaco. However, no athletes from Gibraltar or Monaco participated.

==== Third Division: Individual results ====
No medals are awarded within the individual matches of the Championship, but the following list summarises the podium placings in each match event. Full results can be found on the main article.

Men

Event	First		Second		Third	
100 m	Markus Fuchs; Austria	10.36	Israel Olatunde; Ireland	10.37	Francesco Sansovini; San Marino	10.52
200 m	Mark Smyth; Ireland	20.66	Mindia Endeladze; Georgia	20.98	Markus Fuchs; Austria	20.99
400 m	Franko Burraj; Albania	46.30	Niklas Strohmayer-Dangl; Austria	46.64	Jack Raftery; Ireland	46.76
800 m	Amel Tuka; Bosnia and Herzegovina	1:49.25	Pol Moya; Andorra	1:49.57	Rocco Zaman-Browne; Ireland	1:50.16
1500 m	Raphael Pallitsch; Austria	3:42.52	Cathal Doyle; Ireland	3:43.36	Yervand Mkrtchyan; Armenia	3:44.11
5000 m	Jordan Gusman; Malta	14:16.92	Andreas Vojta; Austria	14.17.02	Fearghal Curtin; Ireland	14:17.64
3000 m steeplechase	Nahuel Carabaña; Andorra	8:48.79	Finley Daly; Ireland	8:51.14	Tobias Rattinger; Austria	8:53.59
110 m hurdles	James Ezeonu; Ireland	14.31	Darko Pesic; Montenegro	14.75	Jan Mitsche; Austria	15.12
400 m hurdles	Thomas Barr; Ireland	49.41	Leo Koehldorfer; Austria	50.70	Andrea Ercolani Volta; San Marino	52.19
4 × 100 m	Ireland; Israel Olatunde; Mark Smyth; Christopher Sibanda; Joseph Ojewumbi	39.57	Israel; Eden Sela; Thomas Dubnov-Raz; Aviv Koffler; Blessing Akwasi Afrifah	39.66	Malta; Beppe Grillo; Graham Pellegrini; Luke Bezzina; Omar El Aida Chaffey	41.11
High jump	David Cussen; Ireland	2.11	Lionel Afan Strasser; Austria	2.11	Samir Hodzic; Bosnia and Herzegovina	1.92
Pole vault	Alexander Auer; Austria	5.10	Lev Skorish; Israel	4.90	Miquel Vilchez Vendrell; Andorra	4.75
Long jump	Andreas Trajkovski; North Macedonia	7.73	Ishay Ifraimov; Israel	7.70	Muhamet Cangeli; Albania	7.36
Triple jump	Levon Aghasyan; Armenia	16.36	Alexis Copello; Azerbaijan	15.91	Lasha Gulelauri; Georgia	15.91
Shot put	Eric Favors; Ireland	20.28	Mesud Pezer; Bosnia and Herzegovina	20.25	Muhamet Ramadani; Kosovo	19.07
Discus throw	Lukas Weisshaidinger; Austria	62.12	Danijel Furtula; Montenegro	57.60	Temuri Abulashvili; Georgia	54.98
Hammer throw	Sean Mockler; Ireland	63.83	Goga Tchikhvaria; Georgia	62.81	Dorian Collaku; Albania	57.86
Javelin throw	Dejan Mileusnic; Bosnia and Herzegovina	71.81	Matthias Lasch; Austria	65.24	Conor Cusack; Ireland	63.95

Mixed

Event	First		Second		Third	
4 × 400 m	Ireland	3:17.16 EL	Austria	3:22.46	Israel	3:27.57

Women

Event	First		Second		Third	
100 m	Magdalena Lindner; Austria	11.57	Alessandra Gasparelli; San Marino	11.65 NU23R	Lauren Roy; Ireland	11.82
200 m	Susanne Gogl-Walli; Austria	23.09	Phil Healy; Ireland	23.79	Alessandra Gasparelli; San Marino	24.30 NR
400 m	Sharlene Mawdsley; Ireland	51.55	Janet Richard; Malta	52.37 NR	Anna Mager; Austria	54.26
800 m	Louise Shanahan; Ireland	2:03.39	Gina McNamara; Malta	2:04.41	Caroline Bredlinger; Austria	2:04.78
1500 m	Sophie O'Sullivan; Ireland	4:27.96	Gina McNamara; Malta	4:28.28	Sivan Auerbach; Austria	4:29.11
5000 m	Luiza Gega; Albania	15:32.39	Lonah Salpeter; Israel	15:36.07	Aoibhe Richardson; Ireland	16:45.02
3000 m steeplechase	Luiza Gega; Albania	9:17.31 CR	Adva Cohen; Israel	9:47.52	Ava O'Connor; Ireland	10:18.10
100 m hurdles	Sarah Lavin; Ireland	12.82	Karin Strametz; Austria	13.25	Linoy Levy; Israel	13.88
400 m hurdles	Lena Pressler; Austria	57.02	Kelly McGrory; Ireland	58.08	Noah Levy; Israel	58.72
4 × 100 m	Austria; Karin Strametz; Susanne Gogl-Walli; Isabel Posche; Magdalena Lindner	44.18 NR	Ireland; Sarah Leahy; Mollie O'Reilly; Joan Healy; Adayemi Talabi	44.80	Israel; Nitzan Asas; Ilana Dorfman; Alina Drutman; Hileni Mor	45.68
High jump	Marija Vukovic; Montenegro	1.87	Sarah Lucic; Bosnia and Herzegovina	1.78	Sommer Lecky; Ireland	1.74
Pole vault	Ellie McCartney; Ireland	4.20	Shanna Tureczec; Austria	3.60	Yarden Mantel; Israel	3.60
Long jump	Ruby Millet; Ireland	6.33	Romi Tamir; Israel	6.07	Yana Sargsyan; Armenia	5.99
Triple jump	Yekaterina Sariyeva; Azerbaijan	13.38	Yana Sargsyan; Armenia	13.06	Saragh Buggy; Ireland	13.01
Shot put	Sopiko Shatirishvili; Georgia	15.86	Michaela Walsh; Ireland	15.26	Estel Valeanu; Israel	15.21
Discus throw	Estel Valeanu; Israel	57.17	Djenebe Touré; Austria	53.12	Kristina Rakočević; Montenegro	51.87
Hammer throw	Hanna Skydan; Azerbaijan	71.69	Nicola Tuthill; Ireland	67.85 NU23R	Bettina Weber; Austria	59.09
Javelin throw	Victoria Hudson; Austria	60.27	Margaryta Dorozhon; Israel	47.23	Marija Bogavac; Montenegro	45.15

==== Score table ====
Event		ALB	AND	ARM	AUT	AZE	BIH	GEO	IRL	ISR	KOS	LIE	MLT	MNE	MKD	SMR
100 metres	M	6	8	3	15	5	9	12	14	0	4	0	10	7	11	13
100 metres	W	8	7	5	15	6	9	4	13	12	11	0	10	2	3	14
200 metres	M	12	5	3	13	6	4	14	15	9	2	0	11	7	8	10
200 metres	W	5	2	12	15	6	9	8	14	11	7	0	10	3	4	13
400 metres	M	15	8	4	14	6	10	3	13	9	5	0	12	2	11	7
400 metres	W	9	7	10	13	11	8	4	15	12	3	2	14	5	6	1
800 metres	M	9	14	10	12	2	15	7	13	8	6	0	11	3	5	4
800 metres	W	8	7	9	13	6	10	5	15	12	11	0	14	3	4	2
1500 metres	M	0	10	13	15	5	8	7	14	12	0	0	11	4	9	6
1500 metres	W	11	8	5	12	10	9	3	15	13	4	2	14	6	7	1
5000 metres	M	3	7	11	14	4	9	8	13	12	0	0	15	5	10	6
5000 metres	W	15	8	5	12	11	7	2	13	14	4	0	10	6	9	3
3000 metre steeplechase	M	7	15	6	13	0	8	9	14	12	4	0	11	5	10	3
3000 metre steeplechase	W	15	9	10	12	0	7	6	13	14	11	0	8	5	0	4
110 metre hurdles 100 metre hurdles	M	9	8	0	13	0	12	7	15	10	0	0	11	14	0	6
110 metre hurdles 100 metre hurdles	W	10	11	8	14	0	12	4	15	13	3	0	5	9	7	6
400 metre hurdles	M	6	11	3	14	10	9	5	15	12	2	0	4	8	7	13
400 metre hurdles	W	9	11	10	15	0	12	7	14	13	4	0	5	8	0	6
4 × 100 metres relay	M	0	8	4	0	9	12	10	15	14	6	0	13	5	11	7
4 × 100 metres relay	W	11	10	9	15	0	0	7	14	13	6	0	12	8	5	0
4 × 400 metres relay	X	6	12	11	14	9	10	7	15	13	5	0	8	3	4	2
High jump	M	10	6	0	14	0	12.5	9	15	12.5	0	0	7	11	8	0
High jump	W	6	7	0	11.5	0	14	9	13	11.5	0	0	5	15	10	8
Pole vault	M	0	13	0	15	0	10.5	9	12	14	0	0	10.5	0	0	0
Pole vault	W	0	9	0	14	0	10	0	15	13	0	0	12	0	8	11
Long jump	M	13	4	7	11	8	10	12	0	14	0	6	9	5	15	3
Long jump	W	5	4	13	12	7	9	3	15	14	0	0	11	10	6	8
Triple jump	M	11	2	15	12	14	8	13	9	10	6	0	7	3	5	4
Triple jump	W	6	3	14	10	15	8	7	13	12	2	0	11	9	4	5
Shot put	M	8	3	6	7	9	14	12	15	10	13	0	4	11	5	2
Shot put	W	0	4	9	11	0	10	15	14	13	7	0	8	12	6	5
Discus throw	M	4	3	8	15	6	12	13	11	10	5	0	9	14	7	2
Discus throw	W	0	4	5	14	0	10	8	12	15	6	11	9	13	7	3
Hammer throw	M	13	6	5	12	0	9	14	15	11	0	0	10	8	7	0
Hammer throw	W	0	5	8	13	15	10	11	14	12	0	0	9	7	6	0
Javelin throw	M	7	3	5	14	0	15	12	13	10	8	11	2	9	4	6
Javelin throw	W	0	7	9	15	0	12	4	11	14	5	0	10	13	6	8
Country		ALB	AND	ARM	AUT	AZE	BIH	GEO	IRL	ISR	KOS	LIE	MLT	MNE	MKD	SMR
Total		257	269	255	473.5	180	363	290	494	434	150	32	352.5	258	235	192
