= Paola García =

Paola García may refer to:

- Paola García (karateka)
- Paola García (footballer)

== See also ==
- Paula García (disambiguation)
