= Paula García =

Paula García may refer to:

- Paula García (tennis)
- Paula García (footballer)
- Paula García (sprinter), Spanish sprinter
- Paula García Ávila, Spanish handballer
