= Iraitz Arrospide =

Spanish long-distance runner

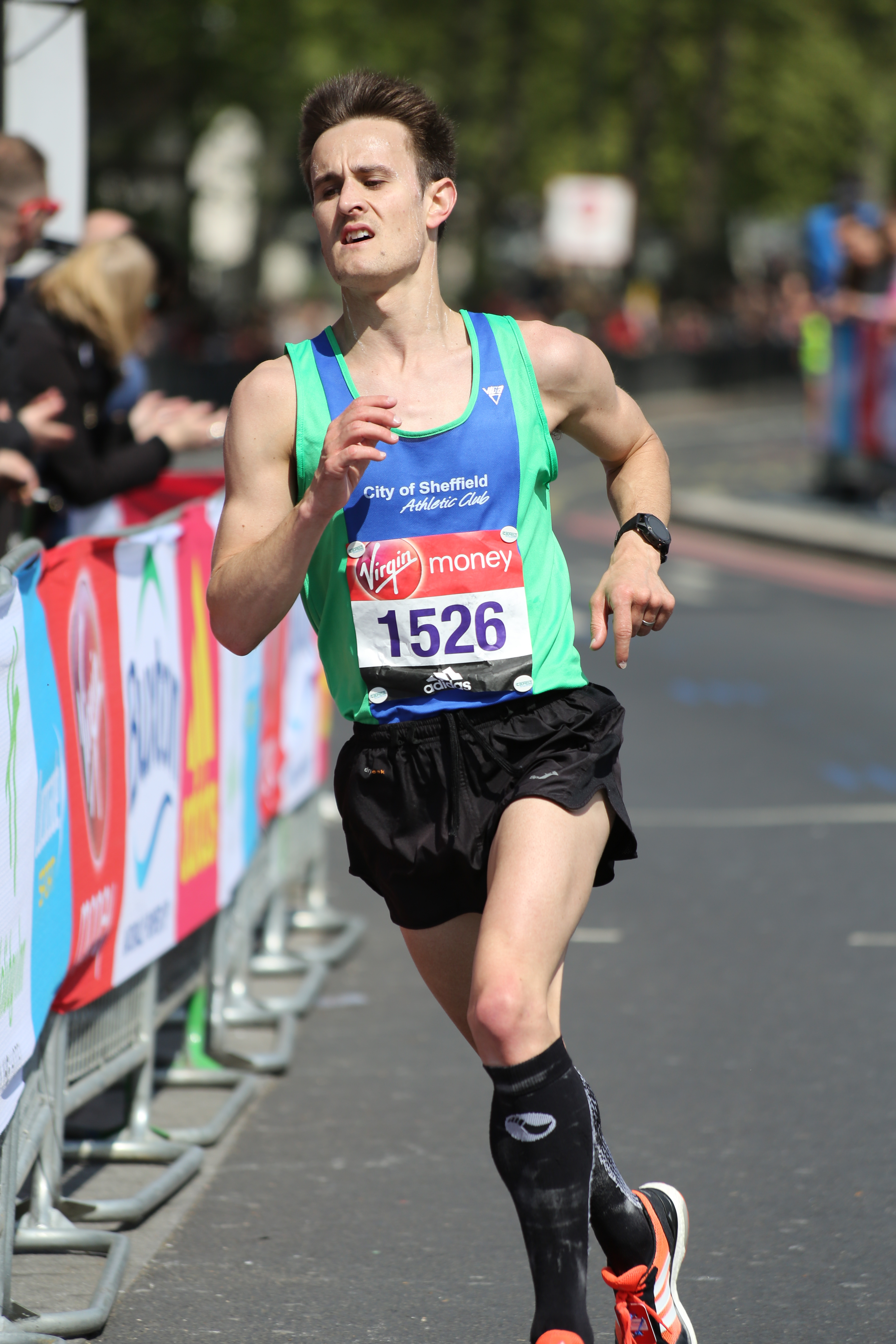
- Iraitz Arrospide in 2017

Personal information
- Born: 5 August 1988 (age 37)

Sport
- Country: Spain
- Sport: Athletics
- Event: Long-distance running

Iraitz Arrospide (born 5 August 1988) is a Spanish long-distance runner. In 2020, he competed in the men's race at the 2020 World Athletics Half Marathon Championships held in Gdynia, Poland.

== Career ==
In 2018, he competed in the men's marathon at the 2018 European Athletics Championships held in Berlin, Germany. He finished in 34th place. He won the silver medal in the 2018 European Marathon Cup.

In 2019, he won the men's race at the IAU 50 km World Championships.

== Achievements ==
Year	Competition	Venue	Position	Event	Notes
Representing Spain
2018	European Championships	Berlin, Germany	34th	Marathon	2:19:49
2019	50 km World Championships	Brașov, Romania	1st	50 km	2:47:42
2020	World Half Marathon Championships	Gdynia, Poland	84th	Half marathon	1:04:07

=== Personal bests ===
- 10 km – 29:38 (San Sebastián, 2020)
- Half marathon – 1:02:56 (Valencia, 2019)
- Marathon – 2:10:59 (Valencia, 2019)
- 50 km – 2:47:42 (Brașov, 2019)
