= Sergiu Ciobanu =

Irish long-distance runner

Personal information
- Born: 10 August 1983 (age 42)

Sport
- Country: Ireland
- Sport: Long-distance running

Sergiu Ciobanu (born 10 August 1983) is an Irish long-distance runner.

He competed in the men's half marathon at the 2018 IAAF World Half Marathon Championships held in Valencia, Spain. He finished in 100th place. In 2018, he also competed in the men's marathon at the 2018 European Athletics Championships held in Berlin, Germany. He finished in 36th place.
