= Yassine Rachik =

Italian long-distance runner

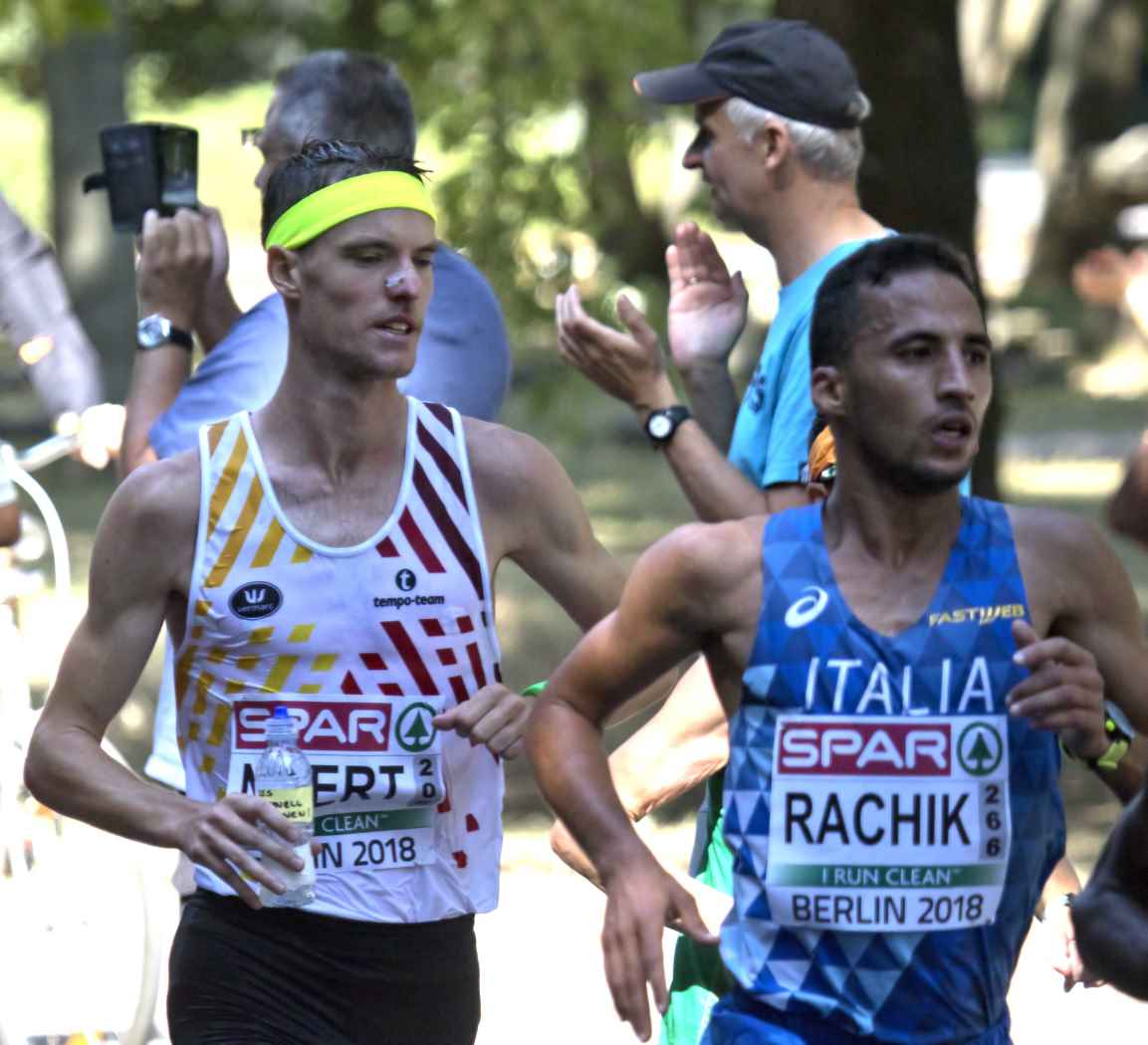
- Rachik (right) at 2018 European Championships marathon

Personal information
- Nationality: Italian
- Born: 11 June 1993 (age 33) Aïn Sebaâ, Morocco
- Height: 1.73 m (5 ft 8 in)
- Weight: 56 kg (123 lb)

Sport
- Country: Italy
- Sport: Athletics
- Event: Long-distance running
- Club: Atletica Casone Noceto
- Coached by: Alberto Colli

Achievements and titles
- Personal bests: 1500 m: 3:40.56 (2016); 3000 m: 8:02.91 (2015); 5000 m: 13:37.88 (2013); 10000 m: 28:50.45 (2014); 10 km road: 28:45 (2017); Half marathon: 1:02:29 (2019); Marathon: 2:08.05 (2019)
Medal record
European Championships
Gold medal – first place	2018 Berlin	Marathon Cup
Bronze medal – third place	2018 Berlin	Marathon
European U23 Championships
Bronze medal – third place	2015 Tallinn	10,000 m

Yassine Rachik (born 11 June 1993) is a Moroccan-born Italian long-distance runner who won the Italian Athletics Championships three times and won an individual bronze medal at the 2018 European Athletics Championships.

== Biography ==
Rachik became an Italian citizen in 2015. During his career he won the gold medal with the Italy national athletics team in the 2018 European Marathon Cup, and also at U-23 level at the 2015 European Athletics U23 Championships held in Tallinn. In 2019, he competed in the men's marathon at the 2019 World Athletics Championships held in Doha, Qatar, finishing in 12th place. He competed in the marathon at the 2020 Summer Olympics.

== Competition record ==
Year	Competition	Venue	Position	Event	Time	Notes
2018	European Championships	(Germany) Berlin	3rd	Marathon	2:12:09	PB
2018	European Championships	(Germany) Berlin	1st	Marathon Team	6:40:48	
2018	London Marathon	(United Kingdom) London	9th	Marathon	2:08:05	PB

== National titles ==
- Italian Athletics Championships
  - 5000 m: 2016
  - Half marathon: 2017
- Italian 10 km road Championship
  - 10 km road race: 2017

== Personal bests ==
- Marathon: 2:08:05, (United Kingdom) London Marathon, 28 April 2019

== See also ==
- Italian all-time lists - Marathon
- Naturalized athletes of Italy
