= Thomas Griesser =

Austrian sprinter

Personal information
- Nationality: Austrian
- Born: 4 March 1967 (age 59) Thal, St. Gallen, Switzerland

Sport
- Sport: Sprinting
- Event: 200 metres

Thomas Griesser (born 4 March 1967) is an Austrian sprinter. He competed in the men's 200 metres at the 1996 Summer Olympics.
