= 2018 European Athletics Championships – Men's marathon =

Men's marathon at the 2018 European Athletics Championships
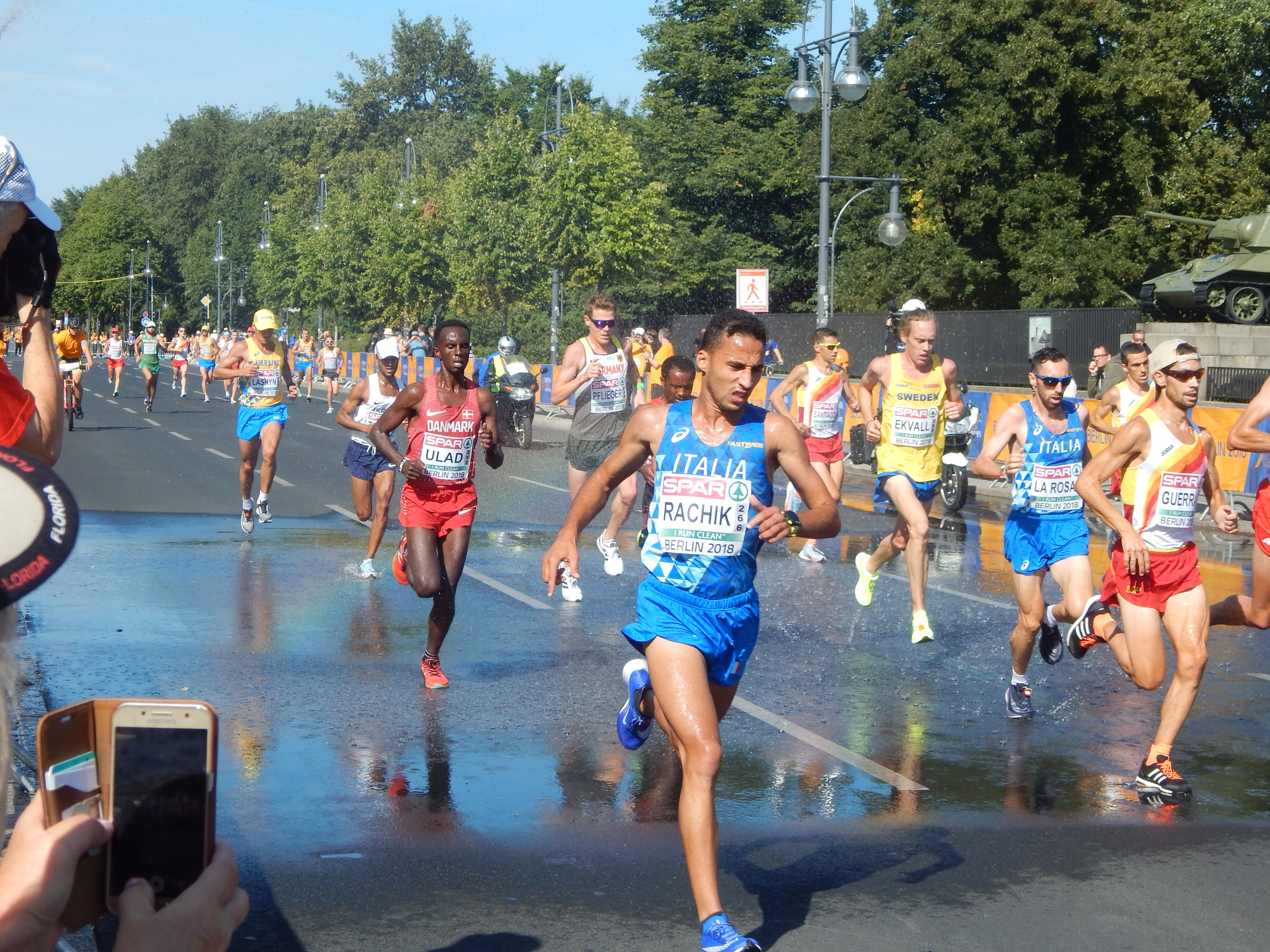
- Location: Berlin
- Dates: 12 August 2018
- Competitors: 72 from 25 nations
- Winning time: 2:09:51

Medalists
gold medal	Koen Naert	Belgium
silver medal	Tadesse Abraham	Switzerland
bronze medal	Yassine Rachik	Italy

The men's marathon at the 2018 European Athletics Championships took place in the inner districts of Berlin on 12 August.

== Records ==
Standing records prior to the 2018 European Athletics Championships
World record	Dennis Kipruto Kimetto (KEN)	2:02:57	Berlin, Germany	28 September 2014
European record	Sondre Nordstad Moen (NOR)	2:05:48	Fukuoka, Japan	3 December 2017
Championship record	Martín Fiz (ESP)	2:10:31	Helsinki, Finland	14 August 1994
World Leading	Mosinet Geremew (ETH)	2:04:00	Dubai, United Arab Emirates	26 January 2018
European Leading	Mo Farah (GBR)	2:06:21	London, Great Britain	22 April 2018
Broken records during the 2018 European Athletics Championships
Championship record	Koen Naert (BEL)	2:09:51	Berlin, Germany	12 August 2018

== Schedule ==
Date	Time	Round
12 August 2018	10:00	Final

All times are local times (UTC+2)

== Results ==
Rank	Athlete	Nationality	Time	Notes
1st place, gold medalist(s)	Koen Naert	Belgium	2:09:51	CR
2nd place, silver medalist(s)	Tadesse Abraham	Switzerland	2:11:24	
3rd place, bronze medalist(s)	Yassine Rachik	Italy	2:12:09	PB
4	Javier Guerra	Spain	2:12:22	
5	Eyob Faniel	Italy	2:12:43	
6	Jesús España	Spain	2:12:58	SB
7	Marhu Teferi	Israel	2:13:00	NR
8	Lemawork Ketema	Austria	2:13:22	PB
9	Tiidrek Nurme	Estonia	2:15:16	PB
10	Peter Herzog	Austria	2:15:29	PB
11	Peter Gröschel	Germany	2:15:48	
12	Stefano La Rosa	Italy	2:15:57	
13	Mariusz Giżyński	Poland	2:16:02	
14	Ihor Olefirenko	Ukraine	2:16:35	
15	Kevin Seaward	Ireland	2:16:58	SB
16	Camilo Raúl Santiago	Spain	2:17:24	
17	Roman Fosti	Estonia	2:17:57	SB
18	Mick Clohisey	Ireland	2:18:00	
19	Henryk Szost	Poland	2:18:09	
20	Valdas Dopolskas	Lithuania	2:18:12	
21	Arkadiusz Gardzielewski	Poland	2:18:21	
22	Pedro Nimo	Spain	2:18:43	
23	Yavuz Ağralı	Turkey	2:18:46	
24	Oleksandr Sitkovskyy	Ukraine	2:18:52	
25	Sean Hehir	Ireland	2:18:58	
26	Remigijus Kančys	Lithuania	2:18:59	
27	Christian Kreienbühl	Switzerland	2:19:00	
28	Jonas Koller	Germany	2:19:16	
29	Gáspár Csere	Hungary	2:19:21	
30	Abdellatif Meftah	France	2:19:23	
31	Yohan Durand	France	2:19:33	
32	Ihor Russ	Ukraine	2:19:39	
33	Sebastian Reinwand	Germany	2:19:46	
34	Iraitz Arrospide	Spain	2:19:49	
35	Yuriy Rusyuk	Ukraine	2:19:49	
36	Sergiu Ciobanu	Ireland	2:19:49	
37	Mert Girmalegesse	Turkey	2:19:58	
38	Philipp Baar	Germany	2:19:59	
39	Benjamin Malaty	France	2:20:19	
40	Ignas Brasevičius	Lithuania	2:20:20	
41	Christian Steinhammer	Austria	2:20:40	
42	Andreas Kempf	Switzerland	2:21:35	
43	Patrik Wägeli	Switzerland	2:21:59	
44	Konstantinos Gkelaouzos	Greece	2:22:24	
45	Błażej Brzeziński	Poland	2:22:35	
46	Marcus Schöfisch	Germany	2:22:57	
47	Paul Pollock	Ireland	2:23:26	
48	Geronimo von Wartburg	Switzerland	2:23:46	
49	Jānis Višķers	Latvia	2:25:28	
50	Panagiotis Karaiskos	Greece	2:25:37	PB
51	Marcel Berni	Switzerland	2:25:53	
52	Artur Kozłowski	Poland	2:26:28	
53	Üzeyir Söylemez	Turkey	2:27:24	
54	Jean-Damascène Habarurema	France	2:27:36	
55	Mindaugas Viršilas	Lithuania	2:27:47	
56	Daniel Daly	Croatia	2:29:25	
57	Arnold Rogers	Gibraltar	2:32:41	PB
58	Dimosthenis Magginas	Greece	2:44:57	
	Abdi Nageeye	Netherlands	DNF	
	Mikael Ekvall	Sweden	DNF	
	Philipp Pflieger	Germany	DNF	
	Ömer Alkanoğlu	Turkey	DNF	
	Tibor Sahajda	Slovakia	DNF	
	Daviti Kharazishvili	Georgia	DNF	
	Valentin Pfeil	Austria	DNF	
	Abdi Hakin Ulad	Denmark	DNF	
	Weldu Negash Gebretsadik	Norway	DNF	
	Dmytro Laschyn	Ukraine	DNF	
	Sondre Nordstad Moen	Norway	DNF	
	Muzaffer Bayram	Turkey	DNF	
	Hassan Chahdi	France	DNF	
	Yared Shegumo	Poland	DNF	

== See also ==
- 2018 European Athletics Championships – Men's Marathon Cup
