= Endiorass Kingley =

Austrian triple jumper (born 2002)

Personal information
- Born: 12 June 2002 (age 24)

Sport
- Sport: Athletics
- Event: Triple jump

Achievements and titles
- Personal bests: Triple jump: 16.85 m (Maribor, 2025) NR

Endiorass Kingley (born 12 June 2002) is an Austrian triple jumper. A multiple-time national champion, in 2025 he became the Austrian national record holder at the event.

== Biography ==
He is a member of TGW Zehnkampf Union. He finished fourth at the 2021 World Athletics U20 Championships in Nairobi, Kenya. He also placed fourth at the 2021 European Athletics U20 Championships in Tallinn.

He placed ninth at the 2025 European Athletics Indoor Championships in Apeldoorn, with a distance of 16.25 metres.

He won competing for Austria at the 2025 European Athletics Team Championships Second Division in Maribor in June 2025, with a jump of 16.85 metres, setting a new national record, breaking Alfred Stummer's 37-year-old previous Austrian record 16.57 metres. He was entered for his Diamond League debut in Monaco at the 2025 Herculis, placing sixth with a jump of 16.61 metres. He placed sixth at the Diamond League Final in Zurich on 28 August. In September 2025, he was a finalist at the 2025 World Championships in Tokyo, Japan, placing ninth overall and equalling his national record during the championships.

Kingsley won the long jump title at the Austrian Indoor Athletics Championships with a jump of 7.20 metres. He also won the triple jump at the championships with a distance of 14.83 metres. In August 2026, he competed in the triple jump at the 2026 European Athletics Championships in Birmingham, England, placing sixth overall.

== Personal life ==
He is based in Linz and is 1.98 metres tall. He is of Nigerian descent.
