= Paula García (footballer) =

Spanish footballer (born 1999)

Personal information
- Full name: Paula García Romero
- Date of birth: 12 June 1999 (age 27)
- Place of birth: Madrid, Spain
- Position: Defender

Team information
- Current team: Sporting de Huelva
- Number: 14

Youth career
- 2014–2015: Atlético Madrid

Senior career*
Years	Team	Apps	(Gls)
2015–2016	Atlético Madrid C		
2016–2020	Atlético Madrid B	12+	
2020–	Sporting de Huelva	36	(0)
- * Club domestic league appearances and goals as of 13:39, 28 May 2022 (UTC)

Paula García Romero (born 12 June 1999) is a Spanish footballer who plays as a defender for Sporting de Huelva.

== Club career ==
García started her career at Atlético Madrid's academy.
