= Paula García (sprinter) =

Spanish athlete (born 1998)

Paula Garcia
Personal information
- Born: 10 November 1998 (age 27) Madrid

Sport
- Sport: Athletics

Achievements and titles
- Personal best(s): 100m: 11.36 (2024); 200m: 23:00 (2025)
Medal record
Women's athletics
Representing Spain
European Games
Bronze medal – third place	2023 Kraków-Małopolska	4 × 100 m relay

Paula García (born 10 November 1998) is a Spanish sprinter. She became Spanish national champion in 2024 over 100 metres.

== Career ==
From Madrid, Garcia attended Wichita State University between 2017 and 2022.

At the 2023 European Athletics Team Championships in Silesia she won a bronze medal in the 4 × 100m relay event. That summer, she was also part of a winning Spanish 4 x 100 metres relay team at the 2023 Meeting de Paris that ran a time sub-43 seconds. Although selected for the Spanish team for the 2023 World Athletics Championships in Budapest, Hungary, she was unable to compete due to injury and was replaced by Esther Navero.

Garcia lowered her personal best to 11.42 seconds for the 100 metres in 2024. She won the Spanish Athletics Championships over 100 metres in La Nucia in June 2024 in a personal best 11.36 seconds. She was selected for the women's 4x100m relay at the 2024 Paris Olympics.

Garcia lowered her personal best to 23.12 seconds for the 200 metres in 2025. Garcia then ran a new personal best 23.00 seconds for the 200 metres in placing fourth in the final of the 2025 Spanish Athletics Championships in August 2025 in Tarragona.
