= List of Austrian records in athletics =

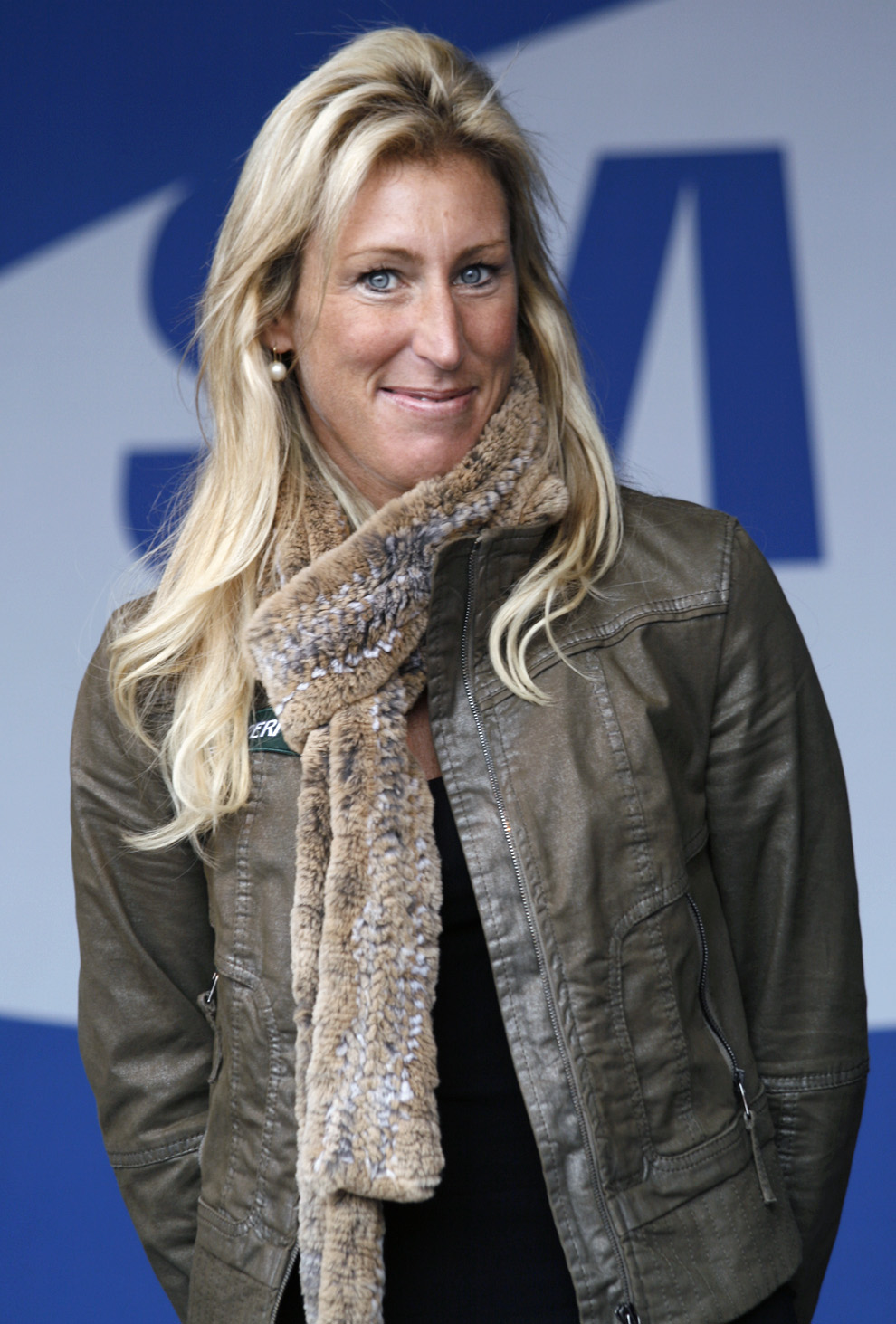
Austrian athlete Stephanie Graf

The following are the national records in athletics in Austria maintained by its national athletics federation, the Austrian Athletics Federation (ÖLV).

== Outdoor ==
Key to tables: Awaiting ratification Record not kept by ÖLV Not ratified or later rescinded by FSHA

=== Men ===
Event	Record	Athlete	Date	Meet	Place	Ref.
100 y	9.52+ (+1.0 m/s)	Ryan Moseley	31 May 2011	Golden Spike Ostrava	Ostrava, Czech Republic	
100 m	10.08 (+1.2 m/s)	Markus Fuchs	8 June 2023	Liese-Prokop-Memorial	Sankt Pölten, Austria	
200 m	20.45 (+0.8 m/s)	Christoph Pöstinger	8 June 1996		Ebensee, Austria	
300 m	32.85	Clemens Zeller	5 September 2008		Vöcklabruck, Austria	
400 m	45.69	Clemens Zeller	3 June 2010	Liese Prokop Memorial	Sankt Pölten, Austria	
800 m	1:46.21	Michael Wildner	19 July 1992		Ingolstadt, Germany	
1000 m	2:18.06	Andreas Vojta	17 June 2014	Golden Spike Ostrava	Ostrava, Czech Republic	
1500 m	3:32.96	Raphael Pallitsch	24 June 2025	Golden Spike Ostrava	Ostrava, Czech Republic	
Mile	3:52.42	Robert Nemeth	9 September 1981	Rieti Meeting	Rieti, Italy	
2000 m	4:59.56	Robert Nemeth	6 August 1984		Klagenfurt, Austria	
3000 m	7:43.66	Dietmar Millonig	15 August 1980	Athletissima	Lausanne, Switzerland	
5000 m	13:13.44	Günther Weidlinger	22 July 2005		London, United Kingdom	
5 km (road)	13:48	Andreas Vojta	14 February 2021	5 km Herculis	Monaco	
10,000 m	27:36.46	Günther Weidlinger	4 May 2008		Palo Alto, United States	
10 km (road)	28:10	Günther Weidlinger	18 May 2008		Manchester, United Kingdom	
15 km (road)	43:01	Günther Weidlinger	29 November 2009	Great Australian Run	Melbourne, Australia	
One hour	20156 m	Dietmar Millonig	30 March 1991		La Fleche, France	
Half marathon	1:01:42	Günther Weidlinger	14 October 2007	World Road Running Championships	Udine, Italy	
25 km (road)	1:15:29	Dietmar Millonig	3 May 1987			
30 km (road)	1:32:28+	Peter Herzog	4 October 2020	London Marathon	London, United Kingdom	
Marathon	2:09:53	Aaron Gruen	30 March 2025	McKirdy Micro Marathon: Road to Tokyo	Rockland Lake State Park, United States	
110 m hurdles	13.14 (−0.8 m/s)	Mark McKoy	3 September 1994		Paris, France	
400 m hurdles	49.33	Thomas Futterknecht	30 August 1985	Universiade	Kobe, Japan	
3000 m steeplechase	8:10.83	Günther Weidlinger	21 August 1999	World Championships	Seville, Spain	
High jump	2.28 m	Markus Einberger	18 May 1986		Schwechat, Austria	
Pole vault	5.77 m	Hermann Fehringer	5 July 1991		Linz, Austria	
Long jump	8.30 m (+2.0 m/s)	Andreas Steiner	4 June 1988		Innsbruck, Austria	
Triple jump	16.85 (−0.1 m/s)	Endiorass Kingley	29 June 2025	European Team Championships	Maribor, Slovenia	
Triple jump	16.85 (+0.5 m/s)	Endiorass Kingley	17 September 2025	World Championships	Tokyo, Japan	
Shot put	20.79 m	Klaus Bodenmüller	13 June 1987		Linz, Austria	
Discus throw	70.68 m	Lukas Weißhaidinger	19 May 2023	HELVETIA Einladungsmeeting	Schwechat, Austria	
Hammer throw	79.70 m	Johann Lindner	24 June 1987		Schwechat, Austria	
Javelin throw	84.03 m	Gregor Högler	17 July 1999		Kapfenberg, Austria	
Decathlon	8320 pts	Gernot Kellermayr	29–30 May 1993	Hypo-Meeting	Götzis, Austria	
Decathlon	100m (wind) / Long jump (wind) / Shot put / High jump / 400m / 110m H (wind) / Discus / Pole vault / Javelin / 1500m; 10.47 (+1.9 m/s) / 7.66 m (+1.3 m/s) / 14.83 m / 1.96 m / 47.56 / 14.12 (+0.4 m/s) / 42.50 m / 5.00 m / 58.24 m / 4:54.78					
20 km walk (road)	1:25:32	Martin Toporek	26 April 1986		Bergen, Norway	
50 km walk (road)	4:02:39	Stephan Wögerbauer	7 June 1992		Přerov, Czech Republic	
4 × 100 m relay	39.16	Austria; Martin Schütznauer; Martin Lachkovics; Thomas Griesser; Christoph Pöstinger	25 June 1996		Luzern, Switzerland	
4 × 200 m relay	1:25.07	LCC Wien; Martin Lachkovics; Andreas Rechbauer; Harald Mauler; Rafik Elouardi	1 June 1996		Villach, Austria	
4 × 400 m relay	3:02.95	Austria; Christoph Pöstinger; Thomas Griesser; Andreas Rechbauer; Rafik Elouardi	9 August 1997	World Championships	Athens, Greece	

=== Women ===
Event	Record	Athlete	Date	Meet	Place	Ref.
100 m	11.15 (±0.0 m/s)	Karin Mayr-Krifka	9 August 2003		Salzburg, Austria	
150 m (bend)	18.59 (−0.9 m/s)	Suri Stöhr	5 May 2024	Internationales Läufermeeting	Pliezhausen, Germany	
200 m	22.70 (+0.1 m/s)	Karin Mayr	7 July 2002		Linz, Austria	
300 m	38.11	Gerda Haas	16 May 1987		Vöcklabruck, Austria	
400 m	50.60	Susanne Gogl-Walli	5 September 2024	Weltklasse Zürich	Zürich, Switzerland	
800 m	1:56.64	Stephanie Graf	25 September 2000	Olympic Games	Sydney, Australia	
1500 m	4:03.02	Theresia Kiesl	3 August 1996	Olympic Games	Atlanta, United States	
Mile run	4:24.37	Theresia Kiesl	14 August 1996	Weltklasse Zürich	Zurich, Switzerland	
Mile (road)	4:47.59 Wo	Katharina Pesendorfer	6 September 2026	New Balance Kö Meile	Düsseldorf, Germany	
3000 m	8:47.04	Susanne Pumper	8 August 2000		Linz, Austria	
5000 m	15:10.54	Susanne Pumper	22 July 2001		London, United Kingdom	
5 km (road)	15:18 Wo	Lisa Redlinger	19 September 2026	World Road Running Championships	Copenhagen, Denmark	
10,000 m	32:12.33	Susanne Pumper	7 May 2005		Salzburg, Austria	
10 km (road)	31:56	Carina Reicht	5 September 2026		Prague, Czech Republic	
10 km (road)	31:45	Susanne Pumper	17 May 2006		Pinkafeld, Austria	
15 km (road)	50:39+ Mx	Julia Mayer	11 February 2024	Barcelona Half Marathon	Barcelona, Spain	
15 km (road)	50:48+ Wo	Julia Mayer	20 September 2026	World Road Running Championships	Copenhagen, Denmark	
20 km (road)	1:07:21+ Wo	Julia Mayer	20 September 2026	World Road Running Championships	Copenhagen, Denmark	
Half marathon	1:10:54 Wo	Julia Mayer	20 September 2026	World Road Running Championships	Copenhagen, Denmark	
25 km (road)	1:26:31+	Julia Mayer	7 December 2025	Valencia Marathon	Valencia, Spain	
30 km (road)	1:43:54+	Julia Mayer	7 December 2025	Valencia Marathon	Valencia, Spain	
Marathon	2:26:08	Julia Mayer	7 December 2025	Valencia Marathon	Valencia, Spain	
100 km (road)	7:45:58	Karin Freitag	27 November 2016			
100 m hurdles	12.82 (+1.4 m/s)	Beate Schrott	17 July 2012	Spitzen Leichtathletik Luzern	Luzern, Switzerland	
400 m hurdles	56.15	Lena Pressler	8 June 2023	Liese-Prokop-Memorial	Sankt Pölten, Austria	
3000 m steeplechase	9:47.61	Andrea Mayr	2 July 2008		Namur, Belgium	
High jump	1.97 m	Sigrid Kirchmann	21 August 1993	World Championships	Stuttgart, Germany	
Pole vault	4.45 m	Kira Grünberg	12 August 2014	European Championships	Zürich, Switzerland	
Long jump	7.09 m (+1.5 m/s)	Ljudmila Ninova	5 June 1994		Seville, Spain	
Triple jump	13.75 m (−0.2 m/s)	Ljudmila Ninova	9 July 1997		Linz, Austria	
Shot put	19.21 m	Valentina Fedyushina	13 July 1999		Casablanca, Morocco	
Discus throw	63.28 m	Ursula Weber	3 June 1990		Schwechat, Austria	
Hammer throw	57.25 m	Julia Siart	12 June 2010	NÖLV Landesmeisterschaften	Amstetten, Austria	
Javelin throw	67.76 m	Victoria Hudson	28 June 2025	European Team Championships	Maribor, Slovenia	
Heptathlon	6591 pts	Verena Preiner	29–30 June 2019	Mehrkampf-Meeting Ratingen	Ratingen, Germany	
Heptathlon	100m H (wind) / High jump / Shot put / 200m (wind) / Long jump (wind) / Javelin / 800m; 13.42 (+0.1 m/s) / 1.80 m / 14.34 m / 23.96 (+1.3 m/s) / 6.16 m (−1.0 m/s) / 49.58 m / 2:07.74					
Mile walk	6:21.85	Theresia Emma Mohr	1 July 2026	Raiffeisen Austrian Open	Eisenstadt, Austria	
10 km walk (road)	45:53	Viera Toporek	26 June 1993			
20 km walk (road)	1:46:31	Kathrin Schulze	2 October 2010	Austrian Race Walk Championships	Hollenburg, Austria	
4 × 100 m relay	44.18	Austria; Karin Strametz; Susanne Gogl-Walli; Isabel Posch; Magdalena Lindner	21 June 2023	European Team Championships	Chorzów, Poland	
4 × 400 m relay	3:34.42	Austria; Silvia Schinzel; Hanni Burger; Andrea Mühlbach; Christiane Wildschek	20 June 1976		Südstadt, Austria	

=== Mixed ===
Event	Record	Athlete	Date	Meet	Place	Ref.
4 × 400 m relay	3:20.62	Austria; Niklas Strohmeyer-Dangl; Helene Vogel; Andreas Wolf; Caroline Bredlinger	29 June 2025	European Team Championships	Maribor, Slovenia	

== Indoor ==
=== Men ===
Event	Record	Athlete	Date	Meet	Place	Ref.
50 m	5.78	Mark McKoy	7 February 1996		Moscow, Russia	
50 m	5.78+	Ryan Moseley	5 March 2010	Meeting Pas de Calais	Liévin, France	
60 m	6.56	Andreas Berger	27 February 1988		Vienna, Austria	
60 m	6.56	Andreas Berger	18 February 1989	European Championships	The Hague, Netherlands	
60 m	6.3 h (Note: doubtful timing)	Andreas Berger	24 February 1991		Karlsruhe, Germany	
200 m	20.82	Christoph Pöstinger	25 February 1996		Vienna, Austria	
400 m	46.14	Christoph Pöstinger	22 February 1999		Chemnitz, Germany	
800 m	1:46.65	Andreas Rapatz	11 February 2012	Vienna Indoor Gala	Vienna, Austria	
1500 m	3:37.36 (Note: by official result source; 3:37.46 by ÖLV source, probably a typo)	Raphael Pallitsch	30 January 2024	Czech Indoor Gala	Ostrava, Czech Republic	
Mile	3:54.28	Michael Buchleitner	1 March 1994		Karlsruhe, Germany	
2000 m	5:04.89	Bernhard Richter	6 March 1993		Karlsruhe, Germany	
3000 m	7:44.19	Günther Weidlinger	18 February 2003	GE Galan	Stockholm, Sweden	
5000 m	13:33.79	Dietmar Millonig	8 February 1986		East Rutherford, United States	
50 m hurdles	6.39	Mark McKoy	27 January 1995		Moscow, Russia	
60 m hurdles	7.44	Elmar Lichtenegger	2 March 2002	European Championships	Vienna, Austria	
High jump	2.24 m	Markus Einberger	16 February 1985		Vienna, Austria	
Pole vault	5.77 m (Note: outdoor mark ratified as absolute record)	Hermann Fehringer	24 February 1991		Vienna, Austria	
Long jump	7.96 m	Isagani Peychär	5 February 2005		Munich, Germany	
Triple jump	16.46 m	Alfred Stummer	3 March 1989	World Championships	Budapest, Hungary	
Shot put	21.03 m (Note: outdoor mark ratified as absolute record)	Klaus Bodenmüller	3 March 1990	European Championships	Glasgow, United Kingdom	
Discus throw	63.91 m	Lukas Weisshaidinger	26 January 2018	ISTAF Indoor	Berlin, Germany	
Heptathlon	6065 pts	Roland Schwarzl	20–21 February 2010	Austrian Championships for Combined Events	Vienna, Austria	
Heptathlon	60m / Long jump / Shot put / High jump / 60m H / Pole vault / 1000m; 6.83 / 7.45 m / 11.87 m / 2.02 m / 8.09 / 4.50 m / 2:42.30					
5000 m walk	19:37.57	Martin Toporek	16 December 1986		Vienna, Austria	
4 × 200 m relay	1:25.21	Austria; Martin Lachkovics; Thomas Griesser; Rafik Elouardi; M. Klampfer	17 February 1996		Vienna, Austria	
4 × 400 m relay	3:08.37	Austria; Martin Lachkovics; Rafik Elouardi; Andreas Rechbauer; Thomas Griesser	8 March 1997	World Championships	Paris, France	

=== Women ===
Event	Record	Athlete	Date	Meet	Place	Ref.
60 m	7.15	Karin Mayr	24 February 2001		Vienna, Austria	
200 m	22.70 (Note: outdoor mark ratified as absolute record)	Karin Mayr	2 March 2002	European Championships	Vienna, Austria	
400 m	51.37	Susanne Gogl-Walli	2 March 2024	World Championships	Glasgow, United Kingdom	
800 m	1:55.85 (Note: outdoor mark ratified as absolute record)	Stephanie Graf	3 March 2002	European Championships	Vienna, Austria	
1500 m	4:06.99	Theresia Kiesl	1 February 1998	Sparkassen Cup	Stuttgart, Germany	
3000 m	8:47.51	Susanne Pumper	29 January 2005	Sparkassen Cup	Stuttgart, Germany	
5000 m	15:43.88	Jennifer Wenth	19 February 2015	XL Galan	Stockholm, Sweden	
60 m hurdles	7.96	Beate Schrott	23 February 2013	Austrian Championships	Vienna, Austria	
High jump	1.96 m	Sigrid Kirchmann	12 March 1994	European Championships	Paris, France	
Pole vault	4.45 m (Note: outdoor mark ratified as absolute record)	Kira Grünberg	6 March 2015	European Championships	Prague, Czech Republic	
Long jump	6.81 m	Ljudmila Ninova	14 February 1996	Russian Winter Meeting	Moscow, Russia	
Triple jump	13.67 m	Ljudmila Ninova	29 February 1992	European Championships	Genoa, Italy	
Shot put	18.67 m	Valentina Fedyushina	22 January 2000		Sindelfingen, Germany	
Javelin throw	54.16 m	Elisabeth Eberl	10 March 2012	World Indoor Throwing	Växjö, Sweden	
Pentathlon	4767 pts	Ivona Dadic	3 March 2017	European Championships	Belgrade, Serbia	
Pentathlon	60m H / High jump / Shot put / Long jump / 800m; 8.45 / 1.87m / 13.93m / 6.41m / 2:14.13					
3000 m walk	12:52.26	Viera Toporek	20 February 1993		Vienna, Austria	
4 × 200 m relay	1:37.18	Austria; Sabine Tröger; Doris Auer; Karin Mayr; Sabine Kirchmaier	6 February 1994		Vienna, Austria	
4 × 400 m relay	3:42.24	Austria; Sabine Gasselseder; Eva-Maria Schöftner; Sabine Mick; Brigitte Mühlbacher	3 March 2002	European Championships	Vienna, Austria	
