= Magdalena Lindner =

Austrian sprinter (born 2000)

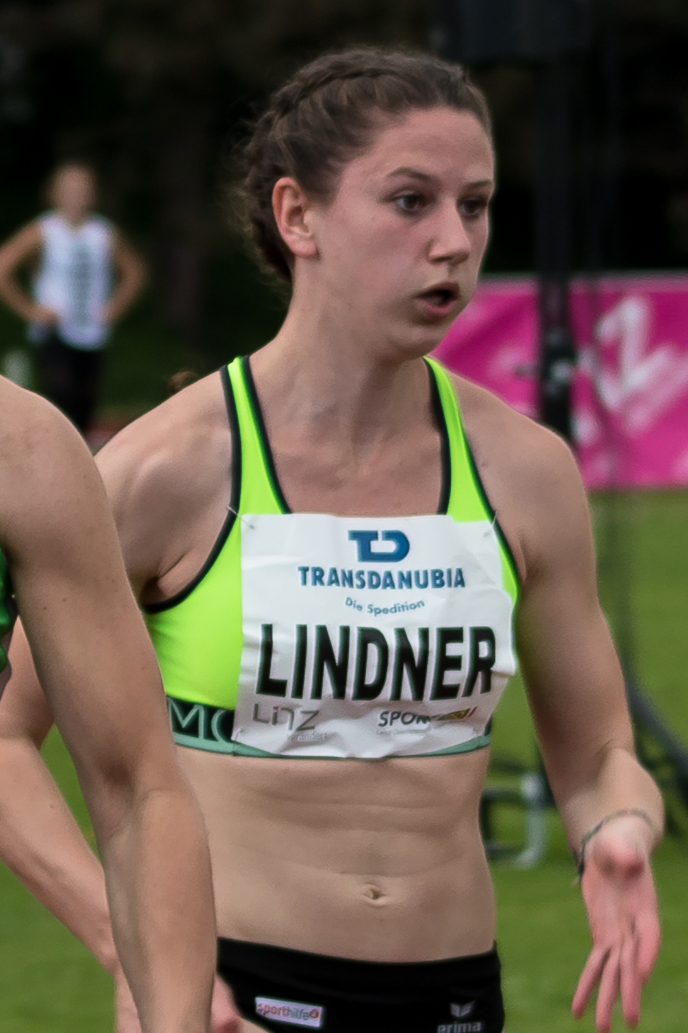
- Lindner in 2017

Personal information
- Born: 14 April 2000 (age 26)

Sport
- Sport: Athletics
- Event: Sprint

Achievements and titles
- Personal bests: 60 m: 7.21 (2026); 100 m: 11.33 (2021); 200 m: 23.43 (2025)
Medal record
Women's athletics
Representing Austria
Summer World University Games
Bronze medal – third place	2021 Chengdu	100 m

Magdalena Lindner (born 14 April 2000) is an Austrian sprinter. She is a multiple-time national champion as has represented Austria at multiple major championships, and was a bronze medalist in the 100 metres at the 2021 World University Games.

== Biography ==
A successful junior athlete, and a member of ULV Krems, Lindner won her fourth U20 Austrian title of the year, and sixteenth age-group national title in total, when she won the 100 metres and 200 metres at the 2019 Austrian U20 Championships in Salzburg.

Having become a member of Union St. Pölten, she won her first senior national title in the 60 metres at the 2021 Austrian Indoor Athletics Championships, making the qualifying time for the upcoming European Indoors, and winning the final in 7.37 seconds. Lindner subsequently represented Austria in the 60 metres at the 2021 European Athletics Indoor Championships in Toruń, Poland, reaching the semi-finals. She was a semi-finalist in the 100 metres at the 2021 European Athletics U23 Championships in Tallinn, Estonia.

Lindner represented Austria in the 100 metres at the 2022 European Athletics Championships in Munich, Germany, running 11.58 seconds but missing out a place in the semi-final by just one place, and one-hundredth of a second.

Lindner represented Austria in the 60 metres at the 2023 European Athletics Indoor Championships in Istanbul, Turkey. In June, she was part of the Austrian women's 4 × 100 metres team which set a new national record at the 2023 European Athletics Team Championships. That summer, she won the bronze medal in the 100 metres at the delayed 2021 World Summer University Games in August 2023 in Chengdu, China, finishing behind Patrizia van der Weken and Viktoria Forster. It was the first medal for an Austrian athlete at the Games since 2017, and the first for a sprinter. She also competed in the 200 metres at the Games, qualifying for the semi-finals the day after her 100 m final, before reaching another final and placing sixth overall.

Lindner set a new 60 metres personal best of 7.32 seconds at the 2024 Austrian Indoor Championships, winning ahead of Isabel Posch. She made her debut in a world championships when she competed in the 60 metres at the 2024 World Athletics Indoor Championships in Glasgow, Scotland, where she ran 7.46 seconds in her heat won by Julien Alfred, without advancing to the semi-finals. Lindner represented Austria in the 100 metres at the 2024 European Athletics Championships in Rome, Italy.

Lindner represented Austria in the 60 metres at the 2025 European Athletics Indoor Championships in Apeldoorn, Netherlands, where she ran the second fastest time of her career with 7.33 seconds, but missed out on a place in the semi-finals.

Running 7.21 seconds, she won the 60 metres final at the 2026 Austrian Indoor Championships ahead of Isabel Posch and Karin Strametz. In August 2026, she competed at the 2026 European Athletics Championships in Birmingham, England, in the women's 100 metres.

== Personal life ==
From Gneixendorf, she studied sports science at the University of Vienna.
