= Christian Steinhammer =

Austrian long-distance runner

Personal information
- Born: 21 October 1988 (age 37)

Sport
- Country: Austria
- Sport: Long-distance running
Medal record
Men's athletics
Representing Austria
European Team Championships
| Silver medal – second place | 2015 Baku | 3000 m s'chase |
| Bronze medal – third place | 2014 Braunschweig | 3000 m s'chase |
European Marathon Cup
| Bronze medal – third place | 2018 Berlin | Marathon |

Christian Steinhammer (born 21 October 1988) is an Austrian long-distance runner.

Steinhammer won the silver medal in the men's 3000 metres steeplechase at the 2015 European Team Championships held in Baku, Azerbaijan. A year earlier, he won the bronze medal in this event.

In 2018, Steinhammer competed in the men's half marathon at the IAAF World Half Marathon Championships held in Valencia, Spain. He finished in 89th place. In the same year, he also competed in the men's marathon at the 2018 European Athletics Championships held in Berlin, Germany. He finished in 41st place with a time of 2:20:40. In 2020, he competed in the men's race at the World Athletics Half Marathon Championships held in Gdynia, Poland.
