= Karin Strametz =

Austrian athlete (born 1998)

Personal information
- Nationality: Austrian
- Born: 18 April 1998 (age 28)

Sport
- Sport: Athletics
- Event: Hurdles

Achievements and titles
- Personal bests: 60 m hurdles: 7.99 (Apeldoorn, 2025); 100 m hurdles: 12.87 (Rome, 2024)

Karin Strametz (born 18 April 1998) is an Austrian hurdler. She has multiple national titles in the 60 m hurdles and 100 m hurdles.

== Biography ==
She set a new personal best running 8.13 seconds for 60 m hurdles at the 2021 European Athletics Indoor Championships in Toruń in March 2021.

She was part of the Austrian national record-setting 4 × 100 m team at the 2021 Diamond League meeting in Lausanne.

She won her first Austrian 60 m hurdles title in February 2022 in 8.23 seconds. Strametz won silver over 60 meters flat at the championships in 7.45 seconds.

She retained her Austrian 60 m hurdles indoor title in February 2023. She ran as part of the Austrian 4 × 100 m team at the 2023 European Team Championships in Silesia, which set a national record of 44.18 seconds. In July 2023, she ran 13.11 seconds for the 100 m hurdles to win the Austrian national title in Bregenz.

She set a new personal best for the 60 metres hurdles of 8.04 in Astana in January 2024. She lowered it to 8.03, winning the Austrian indoor national title in Linz in February 2024. She set another new personal best of 8.00 seconds in reaching the semi-finals in the 60 m hurdles at the 2024 World Athletics Indoor Championships in Glasgow.

She set a new personal best of 12.87 seconds in reaching the semi-finals of the 100 m hurdles at the 2024 European Athletics Championships in Rome. She improved her personal best on the 60 m hurdles to 7.99 seconds in reaching the semi-finals at the 2025 European Athletics Indoor Championships in Apeldoorn.

In September 2025, she competed at the 2025 World Athletics Championships in Tokyo, Japan.

Strametz met the automatic qualification time of 8.02 seconds for the 60 metres hurdles in Vienna on 21 February 2026. The following week, she won the 60 m hurdles title at the Austrian Indoor Athletics Championships with a time of 8.05 seconds in the final. In March 2026, she ran in the 60 metres hurdles at the 2026 World Athletics Indoor Championships in Toruń, Poland. In August, She competed in the women's 4 × 100 metres relay at the 2026 European Athletics Championships in Birmingham, England.
