= Lemawork Ketema =

Austrian long-distance runner

Personal information
- Born: 22 October 1985 (age 40) Huruta, Oromia, Ethiopia

Sport
- Country: Austria
- Sport: Long-distance running
Medal record
Men's long-distance running
Representing Austria
European Marathon Cup
Bronze medal – third place	2018 Berlin	Marathon

Lemawork Ketema (born 22 October 1985) is an Austrian long-distance runner. He competed in the men's marathon at the 2019 World Athletics Championships held in Doha, Qatar. He finished in 41st place. He represented Austria at the 2020 Summer Olympics held in Tokyo, Japan.

Originally, Ketema was born in Huruta, Ethiopia, and he was an Ethiopian refugee. He fled to Austria in 2010 or 2011; there, he was guided by a running coach in Vienna.

== Career ==
Ketema competed in the men's half marathon event at the 2016 European Athletics Championships held in Amsterdam, Netherlands. He finished in 20th place.

In 2018, he competed in the men's half marathon at the 2018 IAAF World Half Marathon Championships held in Valencia, Spain. He finished in 67th place. In the same year, he also competed in the men's marathon at the 2018 European Athletics Championships held in Berlin, Germany. He finished in 8th place with a personal best of 2:13:22. He won the bronze medal in the 2018 European Marathon Cup.

Ketema competed in the men's marathon at the 2020 Summer Olympics held in Tokyo, Japan. He did not finish his race.

== Competition record ==
Year	Competition	Venue	Position	Event	Notes
Representing Austria
2019	World Championships	Doha, Qatar	41st	Marathon	2:20:45
2021	Olympic Games	Sapporo, Japan	–	Marathon	DNF
