= Valentin Pfeil =

Austrian long-distance runner

Personal information
- Nationality: Austrian
- Born: 17 July 1988 (age 37)

Sport
- Sport: Long-distance running
- Event: Marathon

Valentin Pfeil (born 17 July 1988) is an Austrian long distance runner. He competed in the men's marathon at the 2017 World Championships in Athletics. In 2018, he competed in the men's marathon at the 2018 European Athletics Championships held in Berlin, Germany. He did not finish his race.
