= 2018 European Marathon Cup =

International road running competition

The 2018 European Marathon Cup was the 11th edition of the European Marathon Cup of athletics and were held in Berlin, Germany on 12 August, inside of the 2018 European Championships.

The total time is calculated on the sum of the times of the first three athletes arrived at the finish line, but the medals are awarded to all the athletes who have concluded the race.

== Results ==
Men
#	Country	Time
1st place, gold medalist(s)	(Italy) Italy; Yassine Rachik; Eyob Faniel; Stefano La Rosa	6:40:48
2nd place, silver medalist(s)	Spain; Javier Guerra; Jesus Espana; Camilo Raul Santiago; Petro Nimo; Iraitz Arrospide	6:42:43
3rd place, bronze medalist(s)	Austria; Lemawork Ketema; Peter Herzog; Christian Steinhammer	6:49:29
4	Switzerland	6:51:58
5	Poland	6:52:31
6	Ireland	6:53:55
7	Germany	6:54:50
8	Ukraine	6:55:04
9	Lithuania	6:57:29
10	France	6:59:13
11	Turkey	7:06:07
12	Greece	7:32:58

Women
#	Country	Time
1st place, gold medalist(s)	Belarus; Volha Mazuronak; Maryna Damantsevich; Nastassia Ivanova; Nina Savina; Iryna Somava	7:21:54
2nd place, silver medalist(s)	(Italy) Italy; Sara Dossena; Catherine Bertone; Fatna Maraoui; Laura Gotti	7:32:46
3rd place, bronze medalist(s)	Spain; Trihas Gebre; Maria Azucena Diaz; Elena Loyo; Marta Galimany; Clara Simal	7:44:06
4	Great Britain	7:53:16
5	Switzerland	7:54:04
6	Sweden	7:55:21
7	Ukraine	8:01:10
8	Ireland	8:04:46
9	Croatia	8:08:09
10	Turkey	8:19:35
-	Germany	DNF
-	Greece	DNF
