= Austrian Athletics Federation =

Sports governing body in Austria

Austrian Athletics
- Sport: Athletics
- Abbreviation: ÖLV
- Affiliation: World Athletics
- Regional affiliation: EAA
- Headquarters: Vienna, Austria
- President: Sonja Spendelhofer
- Secretary: Helmut Baudis

Official website
- www.oelv.at
- (Austria)

The Austrian Athletic Federation (German: Österreichischer Leichtathletik-Verband) is the governing body for the sport of athletics in Austria.

== Affiliations ==
- World Athletics
- European Athletic Association (EAA)
- Austrian Olympic Committee

== National records ==
ÖLV maintains the Austrian records in athletics.
