= Raphael Pallitsch =

Austrian middle-distance runner

Personal information
- Nationality: Austria
- Born: 18 December 1989 (age 36) Eisenstadt, Austria

Sport
- Sport: Athletics
- Events: 800 metres, 1500 metres
- Club: SVS-Leichtathletik

Raphael Pallitsch (born 18 December 1989) is an Austrian middle-distance runner. A five time national outdoor and three time indoor champion, he is the Austrian national record holder for the 1500 metres both indoors and outdoors. He also competed in the 1500 metres at the 2023 World Athletics Championships.

Pallitsch was initially an 800 metres specialist, having only missed the 2012 Olympic standard for the event by 0.37 seconds. He retired from the sport in 2015, before returning in 2020. He won the 2021 indoor national championships in the 800 meters and the 2022 national championships in both the 800 and 1500 meters. He improved his personal best time in the 1500 meters to 3:40.49 that season. On 25 January 2023 he achieved an indoor best time of 3:40.56 min in Valencia, which was the world leading mark for the year at the time. In July, he won the 1500 metres at the 2023 Balkan Athletics Championships. On 30 January 2024 Pallitsch set a new Austrian indoor record over 1500 meters with a time of 3:37.36. A few months later, he also improved the outdoor record to 3:33.59.

== Personal bests ==
- 800 metres – 1:46.67 (Bottrop 2012)
  - 800 metres indoor – 1:47.94 (Vienna 2012)
- 1500 metres – 3:32.96 (2025 Ostrava Golden Spike) NR
  - 1500 metres indoor – 3:37.36 (Ostrava 2024) NR
- Mile – 3:57.22i (Ostrava 2023)
