= Peter Herzog =

Austrian long-distance runner

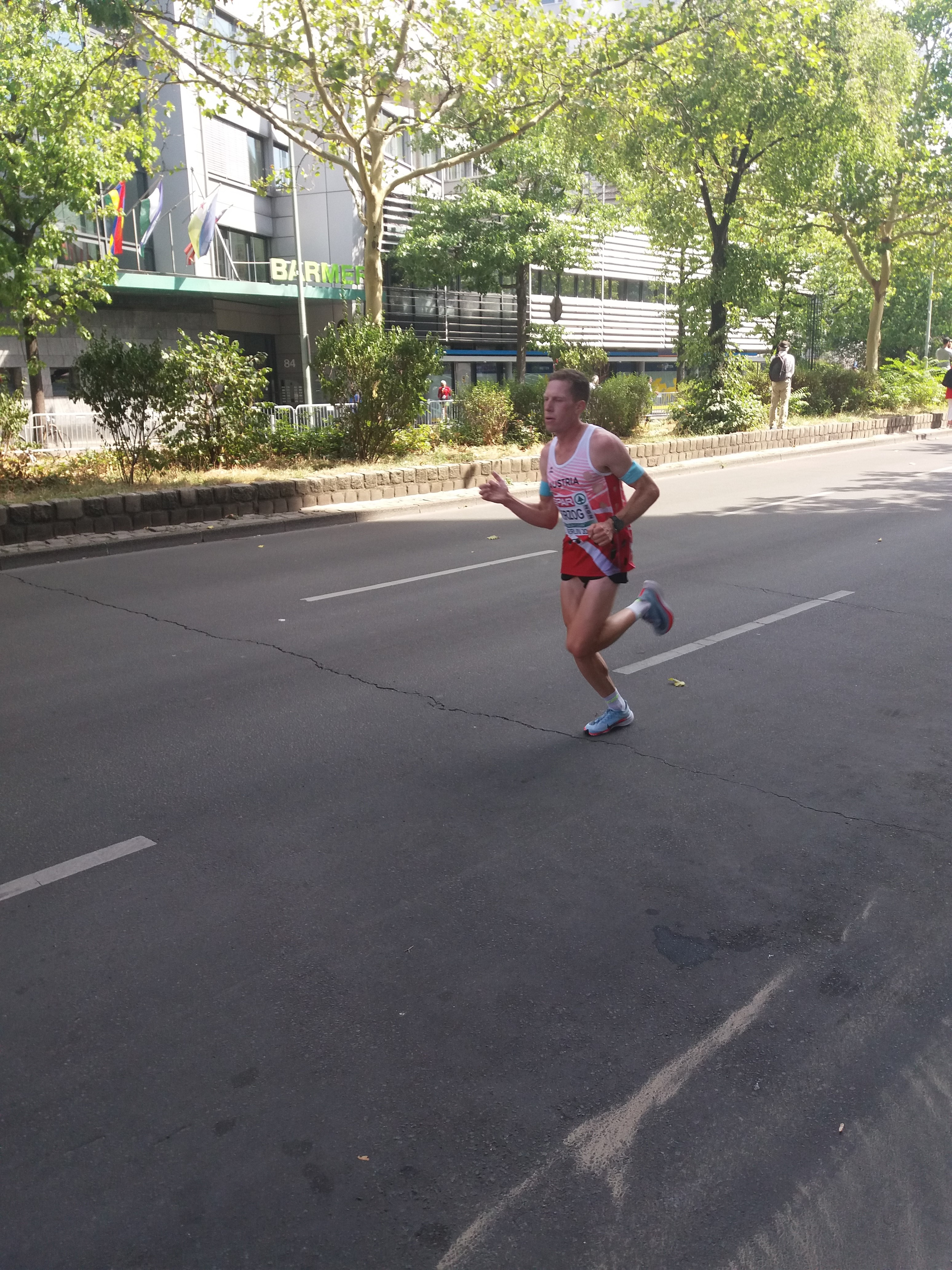
- Herzog at the 2018 European Championships

Personal information
- Born: 1 August 1987 (age 38)

Sport
- Country: Austria
- Sport: Long-distance running
Medal record
Men's long-distance running
Representing Austria
European Marathon Cup
Bronze medal – third place	2018 Berlin	Marathon

Peter Herzog (born 1 August 1987) is an Austrian long-distance runner.

In 2018, he competed in the men's half marathon at the 2018 IAAF World Half Marathon Championships held in Valencia, Spain. He finished in 53rd place. In the same year, he also competed in the men's marathon at the 2018 European Athletics Championships held in Berlin, Germany. He finished in 10th place with a personal best of 2:15:29. He won the bronze medal in the 2018 European Marathon Cup. He participated in the 2020 Olympics.

At London Marathon 2020 Herzog improved the Austrian national marathon record by finishing in 2:10:06 (previous: Lemawork Ketema, 2:10:44, Vienna 2019).
