= Austria at the 2012 European Athletics Championships =

Austria competed at the 2012 European Athletics Championships held in Helsinki, Finland, between 27 June to 1 July 2012. 9 competitors, 6 men and 3 women, took part in 7 events.

== Results ==
=== Men ===
==== Track ====
Event	Athletes	Heats		Semifinal		Final	
Event	Athletes	Result	Rank	Result	Rank	Result	Rank
800 m	Raphael Pallitsch	1:48.84	28	DNQ			
800 m	Andreas Rapatz	1:51.79	34	DNQ			
1500 m	Andreas Vojta	3:41.24	1 Q	—N/a		3:53.23	10
1500 m	Brenton Rowe	3:47.18	20	—N/a		DNQ	
5000 m	Brenton Rowe	—N/a				13:51.58	17

==== Field ====
Event	Athletes	Qualification		Final	
Event	Athletes	Result	Rank	Result	Rank
Discus throw	Gerhard Mayer	62.35	12 q	62.85	8

==== Combined ====
Decathlon	Event	Dominik Distelberger		
Decathlon	Event	Results	Points	Rank
	100 m	10.80	906	2
	Long jump	7.14	847	13
	Shot put	11.22	559	25
	High jump	1.88	696	21
	400 m	48.52	884	4
	110 m hurdles	14.61	897	8
	Discus	38.29	630	19
	Pole vault	4.70	819	12
	Javelin	55.72	674	10
	1500 m	4:37.05	699	12
Final			7611	15

=== Women ===
==== Track ====
Event	Athletes	Heats		Semifinal		Final	
Event	Athletes	Result	Rank	Result	Rank	Result	Rank
100 m hurdles	Beate Schrott	12.98	4 Q	13.08	4 Q	12.98	4
100 m hurdles	Victoria Schreibeis	13.39	22	DNQ			

==== Field ====
Event	Athletes	Qualification		Final	
Event	Athletes	Result	Rank	Result	Rank
High jump	Monika Gollner	1.78	23	DNQ	

== Sources ==
- "ÖLV nominiert zehnköpfiges Team für Leichtathletik EM in Helsinki" (in German). oelv.at. Archived from the original on 2014-11-05.
- "Ryan Moseley muss EM-Start absagen" (in German). oelv.at. Archived from the original on 2014-11-05.
- "European Athletics - Event Website". sportresult.com. Archived from the original on 2012-07-06.
