= Austria at the 2010 European Athletics Championships =

Sporting event delegation

Austria will be represented by 15 athletes at the 2010 European Athletics Championships held in Barcelona, Spain.

== Participants ==
=== Men ===
==== Track and field events ====
Athlete	Events	Heat		Semifinal		Final	
Athlete	Events	Result	Rank	Result	Rank	Result	Rank
Ryan Moseley	100 m	10.38	10 Q	10.27	9	Did not advance	
Ryan Moseley	200 m	21.07	22	Did not advance			
Clemens Zeller	400 m	Did not Finish		Did not advance			
Andreas Rapatz	800 m	1:51.55	23	Did not advance			
Andreas Vojta	1500 m	3:42.16	11 q			3:45.68	11
Michael Schmid	10.000 m					Did not Finish	
Martin Pröll	3000 m steeplechase	8:41.63	19			Did not advance	
Christian Pflügl	Marathon					2:53:15	44
Florian Prüller	Marathon					Did not Finish	
Günther Weidlinger	Marathon					2:23:37	18

==== Field events ====
Event	Athletes	Qualification		Final	
Event	Athletes	Result	Rank	Result	Rank
Discus throw	Gerhard Mayer	60.76	15	Did not advance	

==== Combined events ====
Decathlon	Event	Roland Schwarzl		
Decathlon	Event	Results	Points	Rank
	100 m	11.23 (=SB)	810	20
	Long jump	7.68 (PB)	980	3
	Shot put	14.16	738	14
	High jump	1.86	679	24
	400 m	50.16 (SB)	807	18
	110 m hurdles	14.70	886	11
	Discus throw	44.22	751	12
	Pole vault	5.05	926	4
	Javelin throw	49.86	587	21
	1500 m	4:58.69	567	16
Final			7731	14

=== Women ===
==== Track and road events ====
Athlete	Events	Heat		Semifinal		Final	
Athlete	Events	Result	Rank	Result	Rank	Result	Rank
Doris Röser	200 m	24.32	23	Did not advance			
Victoria Schreibeis	100 m hurdles	13.23	14 q	13.41	14	Did not advance	
Beate Schrott	100 m hurdles	Disqualified		Did not advance			

==== Field events ====
Event	Athletes	Qualification		Final	
Event	Athletes	Result	Rank	Result	Rank
Javelin throw	Elisabeth Pauer	53.45	16	Did not advance	

== Results ==
2010 Barcelona	Gold	Silver	Bronze	Total
Austria (AUT)	0	0	0	0
