= List of Austrian Athletics Championships winners =

The Austrian Athletics Championships is an annual outdoor track and field competition organised by the Austrian Athletics Federation, which serves as the national championship for the sport in Austria. The competition was first held in 1911 and women's events were included shortly after in 1918. Separate annual championship events are held for cross country running, road running and racewalking events.

== Men ==
=== 100 metres ===
- 1960: Elmar Kunauer
- 1961: Waldemar Berger
- 1962: Gert Nöster
- 1963: Waldemar Berger
- 1964: Günther Gehrer
- 1965: Gert Nöster
- 1966: Gert Nöster
- 1967: Axel Nepraunik
- 1968: Axel Nepraunik
- 1969: Axel Nepraunik
- 1970: Gert Herunter
- 1971: Gerald Herzig
- 1972: Axel Nepraunik
- 1973: Georg Regner
- 1974: Georg Regner
- 1975: Peter Mateyka
- 1976: Gernot Massing
- 1977: Peter Mateyka
- 1978: Gernot Massing
- 1979: Josef Mayr
- 1980: Josef Mayr
- 1981: Roland Jokl
- 1982: Roland Jokl
- 1983: Roland Jokl
- 1984: Andreas Berger
- 1985: Andreas Berger
- 1986: Andreas Berger
- 1987: Andreas Berger
- 1988: Andreas Berger
- 1989: Andreas Berger
- 1990: Franz Ratzenberger
- 1991: Andreas Berger
- 1992: Christoph Pöstinger
- 1993: Martin Schützenauer
- 1994: Martin Schützenauer
- 1995: Martin Schützenauer
- 1996: Martin Schützenauer
- 1997: Martin Lachkovics
- 1998: Elmar Lichtenegger
- 1999: Martin Lachkovics
- 2000: Martin Lachkovics
- 2001: Michael Kummer
- 2002: Michael Kummer
- 2003: Martin Lachkovics
- 2004: Roland Kwitt
- 2005: Sergey Osovic
- 2006: Martin Lachkovics

=== 200 metres ===
- 1960: Elmar Kunauer
- 1961: Elmar Kunauer
- 1962: Heinz-Georg Kamler
- 1963: Heinz-Georg Kamler
- 1964: Gert Nöster
- 1965: Gert Nöster
- 1966: Gert Nöster
- 1967: Gert Nöster
- 1968: Axel Nepraunik
- 1969: Axel Nepraunik
- 1970: Gert Herunter
- 1971: Gert Nöster
- 1972: Axel Nepraunik
- 1973: Günther Würfel
- 1974: Günther Würfel
- 1975: Günther Würfel
- 1976: Gernot Massing
- 1977: Peter Mateyka
- 1978: Peter Mateyka
- 1979: Alois Zettl
- 1980: Heinz Hutter
- 1981: Roland Jokl
- 1982: Roland Jokl
- 1983: Roland Jokl
- 1984: Andreas Berger
- 1985: Andreas Berger
- 1986: Andreas Berger
- 1987: Andreas Berger
- 1988: Andreas Berger
- 1989: Andreas Berger
- 1990: Jürgen Böckle
- 1991: Thomas Renner
- 1992: Christoph Pöstinger
- 1993: Thomas Griesser
- 1994: Thomas Griesser
- 1995: Thomas Griesser
- 1996: Andreas Rechbauer
- 1997: Christoph Pöstinger
- 1998: Hans-Peter Welz
- 1999: Martin Lachkovics
- 2000: Martin Lachkovics
- 2001: Hans-Peter Welz
- 2002: Thomas Scheidl
- 2003: Thomas Scheidl
- 2004: Roland Kwitt
- 2005: Roland Kwitt
- 2006: Martin Lachkovics

=== 400 metres ===
- 1960: Wolfgang Pattermann
- 1961: Wolfgang Pattermann
- 1962: Helmut Haid
- 1963: Paul Vago
- 1964: Siegfried Härle
- 1965: Hermann Hosp
- 1966: Peter Hrandek
- 1967: Ernst Zangerl
- 1968: Helmut Haid
- 1969: Alfred Wolf
- 1970: Alfred Wolf
- 1971: Gert Weinhandl
- 1972: Alfred Wolf
- 1973: Herbert Schrautzer
- 1974: Herbert Schrautzer & Alois Zettl
- 1975: Alois Zettl
- 1976: Alex Fortelny
- 1977: Alex Fortelny
- 1978: Alex Fortelny
- 1979: Alex Fortelny
- 1980: Alex Fortelny
- 1981: Herwig Tavernaro
- 1982: Herwig Tavernaro
- 1983: Thomas Futterknecht
- 1984: Thomas Futterknecht
- 1985: Thomas Futterknecht
- 1986: Klaus Ehrle
- 1987: Klaus Ehrle
- 1988: Alfred Hugl
- 1989: Thomas Futterknecht
- 1990: Alfred Hugl
- 1991: Andreas Rapek
- 1992: Klaus Angerer
- 1993: Klaus Angerer
- 1994: Klaus Angerer
- 1995: Klaus Angerer
- 1996: Andreas Rechbauer
- 1997: Rafik Elouardi
- 1998: Andreas Rechbauer
- 1999: Andreas Rechbauer
- 2000: Andreas Rechbauer
- 2001: Andreas Rechbauer
- 2002: Andreas Rechbauer
- 2003: Ralf Hegny
- 2004: Ralf Hegny
- 2005: Ralf Hegny
- 2006: Ralf Hegny

=== 800 metres ===
- 1960: Rudolf Klaban
- 1961: Rudolf Klaban
- 1962: Rudolf Klaban
- 1963: Rudolf Klaban
- 1964: Rudolf Klaban
- 1965: Volker Tulzer
- 1966: Rudolf Klaban
- 1967: Volker Tulzer
- 1968: Hermann Hosp
- 1969: Hermann Hosp
- 1970: Volker Tulzer
- 1971: Walter Grabul
- 1972: Horst Rothauer
- 1973: Horst Rothauer
- 1974: Karl Sander
- 1975: Horst Rothauer
- 1976: Günther Pichler
- 1977: Karl Sander
- 1978: Robert Nemeth
- 1979: Michael Hillardt (AUS)
- 1980: Michael Hillardt (AUS)
- 1981: Robert Nemeth
- 1982: Robert Nemeth
- 1983: Peter Schwarzenpoller
- 1984: Herwig Tavernaro
- 1985: Peter Svaricek
- 1986: Peter Svaricek
- 1987: Herwig Tavernaro
- 1988: Karl Blaha
- 1989: Peter Svaricek
- 1990: Bernhard Richter
- 1991: Werner Edler-Muhr
- 1992: Werner Edler-Muhr
- 1993: Michael Wildner
- 1994: Thomas Ebner
- 1995: Michael Wildner
- 1996: Michael Wildner
- 1997: Michael Wildner
- 1998: Oliver Münzer
- 1999: Werner Edler-Muhr
- 2000: Mario Handle
- 2001: Sebastian Resch
- 2002: Sebastian Resch
- 2003: Sebastian Resch
- 2004: Daniel Spitzl
- 2005: Georg Mlynek
- 2006: Andreas Rapatz

=== 1500 metres ===
- 1960: Rudolf Klaban
- 1961: Rudolf Klaban
- 1962: Rudolf Klaban
- 1963: Rudolf Klaban
- 1964: Rudolf Klaban
- 1965: Rudolf Klaban
- 1966: Rudolf Klaban
- 1967: Rudolf Klaban
- 1968: Rudolf Klaban
- 1969: Heinrich Händlhuber
- 1970: Heinrich Händlhuber
- 1971: Walter Grabul
- 1972: Peter Rettenbacher
- 1973: Dietmar Millonig
- 1974: Herbert Tschernitz
- 1975: Peter Lindtner
- 1976: Dietmar Millonig
- 1977: Peter Lindtner
- 1978: Dietmar Millonig
- 1979: Dietmar Millonig
- 1980: Michael Hillardt (AUS)
- 1981: Robert Nemeth
- 1982: Robert Nemeth
- 1983: Robert Nemeth
- 1984: Robert Nemeth
- 1985: Robert Nemeth
- 1986: Karl Blaha
- 1987: Karl Blaha
- 1988: Karl Blaha
- 1989: Karl Blaha
- 1990: Karl Blaha
- 1991: Werner Edler-Muhr
- 1992: Werner Edler-Muhr
- 1993: Bernhard Richter
- 1994: Werner Edler-Muhr
- 1995: Thomas Ebner
- 1996: Thomas Ebner
- 1997: Werner Edler-Muhr
- 1998: Bernhard Richter
- 1999: Günther Weidlinger
- 2000: Günther Weidlinger
- 2001: Roland Waldner
- 2002: Sebastian Resch
- 2003: Daniel Spitzl
- 2004: Daniel Spitzl
- 2005: Daniel Spitzl
- 2006: Daniel Spitzl

=== 5000 metres ===
- 1960: Laszlo Tanay
- 1961: Walter Steinbach
- 1962: Horst Gansel
- 1963: Horst Gansel
- 1964: Horst Gansel
- 1965: Manfred Wicher
- 1966: Rudolf Klaban
- 1967: Rudolf Klaban
- 1968: Rudolf Klaban
- 1969: Heinrich Händlhuber
- 1970: Hans Müller
- 1971: Hubert Millonig
- 1972: Josef Steiner
- 1973: Heinrich Händlhuber
- 1974: Heinrich Händlhuber
- 1975: Dietmar Millonig
- 1976: Dietmar Millonig
- 1977: Dietmar Millonig
- 1978: Erwin Wagger
- 1979: Erwin Wagger
- 1980: Dietmar Millonig
- 1981: Dietmar Millonig
- 1982: Dietmar Millonig
- 1983: Dietmar Millonig
- 1984: Dietmar Millonig
- 1985: Gerhard Hartmann
- 1986: Gerhard Hartmann
- 1987: Gerhard Hartmann
- 1988: Dietmar Millonig
- 1989: Gerhard Hartmann
- 1990: Dietmar Millonig
- 1991: Dietmar Millonig
- 1992: Dietmar Millonig
- 1993: Michael Buchleitner
- 1994: Michael Buchleitner
- 1995: Michael Buchleitner
- 1996: Werner Edler-Muhr
- 1997: Harald Steindorfer
- 1998: Michael Buchleitner
- 1999: Harald Steindorfer
- 2000: Bernhard Richter
- 2001: Harald Steindorfer
- 2002: Harald Steindorfer
- 2003: Martin Pröll
- 2004: Günther Weidlinger
- 2005: Günther Weidlinger
- 2006: Martin Pröll

=== 10,000 metres ===
- 1960: Karl Lackner
- 1961: Adolf Gruber
- 1962: Adolf Gruber
- 1963: Horst Gansel
- 1964: Ernst Stöckl
- 1965: Horst Gansel
- 1966: Horst Gansel
- 1967: Manfred Wicher
- 1968: Manfred Wicher
- 1969: Richard Fink
- 1970: Hans Müller
- 1971: Hans Müller
- 1972: Hans Müller
- 1973: Heinrich Händlhuber
- 1974: Heinrich Händlhuber
- 1975: Peter Lindtner
- 1976: Heinrich Glas
- 1977: Josef Steiner
- 1978: Erwin Wagger
- 1979: Dietmar Millonig
- 1980: Dietmar Millonig
- 1981: Dietmar Millonig
- 1982: Dietmar Millonig
- 1983: Hannes Gruber
- 1984: Dietmar Millonig
- 1985: Dietmar Millonig
- 1986: Robert Nemeth
- 1987: Robert Nemeth
- 1988: Gerhard Hartmann
- 1989: Gerhard Hartmann
- 1990: Helmut Schmuck
- 1991: Dietmar Millonig
- 1992: Gerhard Hartmann
- 1993: Dietmar Millonig
- 1994: Robert Platzer
- 1995: Helmut Schenk
- 1996: Terefe Mekonen
- 1997: Michael Buchleitner
- 1998: Harald Steindorfer
- 1999: Harald Steindorfer
- 2000: Bernhard Richter
- 2001: Harald Steindorfer
- 2002: Harald Steindorfer
- 2003: Günther Weidlinger
- 2004: Günther Weidlinger
- 2005: Günther Weidlinger
- 2006: Martin Pröll

=== 10K run ===
- 2005: Günther Weidlinger
- 2006: Günther Weidlinger

=== Half marathon ===
- 1992: Dietmar Millonig
- 1993: Helmut Schmuck
- 1994: Max Wenisch
- 1995: Michael Buchleitner
- 1996: Max Wenisch
- 1997: Michael Buchleitner
- 1998: Christian Pflügl
- 1999: Robert Platzer
- 2000: Roman Weger
- 2001: Roman Weger
- 2002: Roman Weger
- 2003: Harald Steindorfer
- 2004: Markus Hohenwarter
- 2005: Markus Hohenwarter

=== 25K run ===
- 1960: Adolf Gruber
- 1961: Adolf Gruber
- 1962: Ernst Stöckl
- 1963: Ernst Stöckl
- 1964: Hans Sluzak
- 1965: Adolf Gruber
- 1966: Hans Sluzak
- 1967: Georg Förster
- 1968: Gero Grabenwarter
- 1969: Heinz Keminger
- 1970: Josef Hagen
- 1971: Richard Fink
- 1972: Georg Förster
- 1973: Hans Müller
- 1974: Richard Fink
- 1975: Richard Fink
- 1976: Heinrich Händlhuber
- 1977: Ignaz Waude
- 1978: Heinrich Händlhuber
- 1979: Josef Steiner
- 1980: Peter Pfeifenberger
- 1981: Gerhard Hartmann
- 1982: Gerhard Hartmann
- 1983: Gerhard Hartmann
- 1984: Hannes Gruber
- 1985: Hansjörg Randl
- 1986: Dietmar Millonig
- 1987: Peter Schatz
- 1988: Helmut Schmuck
- 1989: Helmut Schmuck
- 1990: Helmut Schmuck
- 1991: Dietmar Millonig

=== Marathon ===
- 1960: Adolf Gruber
- 1961: Adolf Gruber
- 1962: Adolf Gruber
- 1963: Adolf Gruber
- 1964: Helmut Richter
- 1965: Helmut Richter
- 1966: Helmut Richter
- 1967: Georg Förster
- 1968: Georg Förster
- 1969: Georg Förster
- 1970: Georg Förster
- 1971: Georg Förster
- 1972: Hans Müller
- 1973: Georg Förster
- 1974: Georg Förster
- 1975: Richard Fink
- 1976: Franz Pumhösl
- 1977: Ignaz Waude
- 1978: Martin Köhler
- 1979: Josef Steiner
- 1980: Balthasar Praschberger
- 1981: Josef Steiner
- 1982: Hubert Haas
- 1983: Gottfried Neuwirth
- 1984: Gerhard Hartmann
- 1985: Peter Schatz
- 1986: Hansjörg Randl
- 1987: Gerhard Hartmann
- 1988: Horst Röthel
- 1989: Erich Kokaly
- 1990: Helmut Schmuck
- 1991: Rolf Theuer
- 1992: Gerhard Hartmann
- 1993: Peter Pfeifenberger
- 1994: Max Wenisch
- 1995: Max Wenisch
- 1996: Max Wenisch
- 1997: Christian Kremslehner
- 1998: Harald Bauer
- 1999: Nicolas Salinger
- 2000: Max Wenisch
- 2001: Roman Weger
- 2002: Max Wenisch
- 2003: Michael Buchleitner
- 2004: Roman Weger
- 2005: Erich Kokaly
- 2006: Roman Weger

=== 3000 metres steeplechase ===
- 1960: Walter Steinbach
- 1961: Walter Steinbach
- 1962: Horst Gansel
- 1963: Horst Gansel
- 1964: Horst Gansel
- 1965: Manfred Wicher
- 1966: Manfred Wicher
- 1967: Manfred Wicher
- 1968: Manfred Wicher
- 1969: Peter Rettenbacher
- 1970: Hans Müller
- 1971: Hans Müller
- 1972: Fritz Käfer
- 1973: Peter Lindtner
- 1974: Peter Lindtner
- 1975: Peter Lindtner
- 1976: Peter Lindtner
- 1977: Peter Lindtner
- 1978: Wolfgang Konrad
- 1979: Wolfgang Konrad
- 1980: Wolfgang Konrad
- 1981: Peter Pfeifenberger
- 1982: Wolfgang Konrad
- 1983: Hannes Gruber
- 1984: Hannes Gruber
- 1985: Wolfgang Konrad
- 1986: Wolfgang Konrad
- 1987: Peter Pfeifenberger
- 1988: Wolfgang Fritz
- 1989: Wolfgang Fritz
- 1990: Michael Buchleitner
- 1991: Wolfgang Fritz
- 1992: Michael Buchleitner
- 1993: Hans Funder
- 1994: Hans Funder
- 1995: Hans Funder
- 1996: Eugen Song
- 1997: Günther Weidlinger
- 1998: Günther Weidlinger
- 1999: Günther Weidlinger
- 2000: Georg Mlynek
- 2001: Georg Mlynek
- 2002: Martin Pröll
- 2003: Günther Weidlinger
- 2004: Martin Pröll
- 2005: Martin Pröll
- 2006: Günther Weidlinger

=== 110 metres hurdles ===
- 1960: Reinhold Flaschberger
- 1961: Hans Muchitsch
- 1962: Konrad Lerch
- 1963: Helmut Haid
- 1964: Helmut Haid
- 1965: Gunter Zikeli
- 1966: Gunter Zikeli
- 1967: Horst Mandl
- 1968: Horst Mandl
- 1969: Horst Mandl
- 1970: Gert Herunter
- 1971: Klaus Potsch
- 1972: Klaus Potsch
- 1973: Armin Vilas
- 1974: Sepp Zeilbauer
- 1975: Armin Vilas
- 1976: Armin Vilas
- 1977: Armin Vilas
- 1978: Sepp Zeilbauer
- 1979: Sepp Zeilbauer
- 1980: Herbert Kreiner
- 1981: Herbert Kreiner
- 1982: Herbert Kreiner
- 1983: Herbert Kreiner
- 1984: Herbert Kreiner
- 1985: Kurt Kriegler
- 1986: Thomas Weimann
- 1987: Norbert Tomaschek
- 1988: Thomas Weimann
- 1989: Thomas Weimann
- 1990: Hubert Petz
- 1991: Herwig Röttl
- 1992: Herwig Röttl
- 1993: Christian Maislinger
- 1994: Mark McKoy
- 1995: Herwig Röttl
- 1996: Christian Maislinger
- 1997: Elmar Lichtenegger
- 1998: Elmar Lichtenegger
- 1999: Elmar Lichtenegger
- 2000: Elmar Lichtenegger
- 2001: Elmar Lichtenegger
- 2002: Elmar Lichtenegger
- 2003: Leo Hudec
- 2004: Leo Hudec
- 2005: Elmar Lichtenegger
- 2006: Elmar Lichtenegger

=== 200 metres hurdles ===
- 1961: Helmut Haid
- 1962: Helmut Haid
- 1963: Helmut Haid
- 1964: Helmut Haid
- 1965: Gert Herunter

=== 400 metres hurdles ===
- 1960: Hans Muchitsch
- 1961: Helmut Haid
- 1962: Helmut Haid
- 1963: Helmut Haid
- 1964: Helmut Haid
- 1965: Helmut Haid
- 1966: Robert Kropiunik
- 1967: Helmut Haid
- 1968: Helmut Haid
- 1969: Helmut Haid
- 1970: Robert Kropiunik
- 1971: Helmut Haid
- 1972: Helmut Haid
- 1973: Gert Weinhandl
- 1974: Gert Weinhandl
- 1975: Gert Weinhandl
- 1976: Gert Weinhandl
- 1977: Felix Rümmele
- 1978: Felix Rümmele
- 1979: Felix Rümmele
- 1980: Felix Rümmele
- 1981: Felix Rümmele
- 1982: Herbert Kreiner
- 1983: Thomas Futterknecht
- 1984: Thomas Futterknecht
- 1985: Thomas Futterknecht
- 1986: Thomas Futterknecht
- 1987: Klaus Ehrle
- 1988: Klaus Ehrle
- 1989: Klaus Ehrle
- 1990: Klaus Ehrle
- 1991: Klaus Ehrle
- 1992: Peter Knoll
- 1993: Andreas Rapek
- 1994: Peter Knoll
- 1995: Peter Knoll
- 1996: Peter Knoll
- 1997: Peter Knoll
- 1998: Karl Lang
- 1999: Karl Lang
- 2000: Karl Lang
- 2001: Karl Lang
- 2002: Karl Lang
- 2003: Karl Lang
- 2004: Ralf Hegny
- 2005: Gotthard Schöpf
- 2006: Gotthard Schöpf

=== High jump ===
- 1960: Helmut Donner
- 1961: Helmut Donner
- 1962: Walter Schwimbersky
- 1963: Helmut Donner
- 1964: Helmut Donner
- 1965: Helmut Donner
- 1966: Herbert Janko
- 1967: Herbert Janko
- 1968: Herbert Janko
- 1969: Wolfgang Steinbach
- 1970: Horst Mandl
- 1971: Hans Crepaz
- 1972: Walter Gurker
- 1973: Horst Mandl
- 1974: Wolfgang Tschirk
- 1975: Wolfgang Tschirk
- 1976: Wolfgang Tschirk
- 1977: Wolfgang Tschirk
- 1978: Wolfgang Tschirk
- 1979: Wolfgang Tschirk
- 1980: Wolfgang Tschirk
- 1981: Wolfgang Tschirk
- 1982: Wolfgang Tschirk
- 1983: Wolfgang Tschirk
- 1984: Wolfgang Tschirk
- 1985: Markus Einberger
- 1986: Gottfried Wittgruber
- 1987: Markus Einberger
- 1988: Markus Einberger
- 1989: Markus Einberger
- 1990: Wolfgang Tschirk
- 1991: Wolfgang Tschirk
- 1992: Niki Grundner
- 1993: Niki Grundner
- 1994: Pavel Vanicek
- 1995: Günther Gasper
- 1996: Pavel Vanicek
- 1997: Pavel Vanicek
- 1998: Erwin Reiterer
- 1999: Pavel Vanicek
- 2000: Pavel Vanicek
- 2001: Günther Gasper
- 2002: Pavel Vanicek
- 2003: Pavel Vanicek
- 2004: Günther Gasper
- 2005: Pavel Vanicek
- 2006: Martin Kalss

=== Pole vault ===
- 1960: Karl Bauer
- 1961: Karl Bauer
- 1962: Günther Gratzer
- 1963: Günther Gratzer
- 1964: Günther Gratzer
- 1965: Karl Bauer
- 1966: Ingo Peyker
- 1967: Peter Zwerger
- 1968: Ingo Peyker
- 1969: Peter Zwerger
- 1970: Peter Fieber
- 1971: Ingo Peyker
- 1972: Ingo Peyker
- 1973: Ingo Peyker
- 1974: Lukas Rettenbacher
- 1975: Sepp Zeilbauer
- 1976: Sepp Zeilbauer
- 1977: Gerhard Parger
- 1978: Reinhard Lechner
- 1979: Lukas Rettenbacher
- 1980: Reinhard Lechner
- 1981: Reinhard Lechner
- 1982: Hermann Fehringer
- 1983: Hermann Fehringer
- 1984: Hermann Fehringer
- 1985: Gerald Kager
- 1986: Hermann Fehringer
- 1987: Hermann Fehringer
- 1988: Gerald Kager
- 1989: Hermann Fehringer
- 1990: Hermann Fehringer
- 1991: Hermann Fehringer
- 1992: Martin Tischler
- 1993: Martin Tischler
- 1994: Hermann Fehringer
- 1995: Hermann Fehringer
- 1996: Hermann Fehringer
- 1997: Stefan Klein & Markus Volek
- 1998: Martin Seer
- 1999: Martin Seer
- 2000: Martin Tischler
- 2001: Martin Tischler
- 2002: Martin Tischler
- 2003: Thomas Ager
- 2004: Thomas Tebbich
- 2005: Thomas Ager
- 2006: Thomas Ager

=== Long jump ===
- 1960: Hans Muchitsch
- 1961: Hans Muchitsch
- 1962: Horst Mandl
- 1963: Gerhard Mmaschek
- 1964: Horst Mandl
- 1965: Horst Mandl
- 1966: Horst Mandl
- 1967: Ingo Peyker
- 1968: Ingo Peyker
- 1969: Gerald Weixelbaumer
- 1970: Ingo Peyker
- 1971: Gerald Herzig
- 1972: Gerald Weixelbaumer
- 1973: Helmut Matzner
- 1974: Helmut Matzner
- 1975: Helmut Matzner
- 1976: Alexander Leitner
- 1977: Georg Werthner
- 1978: Werner Prenner
- 1979: Gerald Herzig
- 1980: William Rea
- 1981: Werner Prenner
- 1982: Gerald Kager
- 1983: Werner Prenner
- 1984: Alfred Stummer
- 1985: Alfred Stummer
- 1986: Teddy Steinmayr
- 1987: Andreas Steiner
- 1988: Andreas Steiner
- 1989: Teddy Steinmayr
- 1990: Teddy Steinmayr
- 1991: Teddy Steinmayr
- 1992: Teddy Steinmayr
- 1993: Teddy Steinmayr
- 1994: Manfred Auinger
- 1995: Teddy Steinmayr
- 1996: Martin Löbel
- 1997: Martin Löbel
- 1998: Martin Löbel
- 1999: Harald Weiser
- 2000: Daniel Hagspiel
- 2001: Martin Löbel
- 2002: Isagani Peychär
- 2003: Roland Schwarzl
- 2004: Isagani Peychär
- 2005: Isagani Peychär
- 2006: Csaba Szekely

=== Triple jump ===
- 1960: Wolfgang Feketeföldi
- 1961: Heinrich Batik
- 1962: Heinrich Batik
- 1963: Werner Vonblon
- 1964: Horst Mandl
- 1965: Horst Mandl
- 1966: Horst Mandl
- 1967: Horst Mandl
- 1968: Horst Mandl
- 1969: Horst Mandl
- 1970: Horst Mandl
- 1971: Horst Mandl
- 1972: Horst Mandl
- 1973: Helmut Matzner
- 1974: Helmut Matzner
- 1975: Helmut Matzner
- 1976: Heinrich Libal
- 1977: Georg Werthner
- 1978: Heinrich Libal
- 1979: Georg Werthner
- 1980: Georg Werthner
- 1981: Harald Florian
- 1982: Georg Werthner
- 1983: Adolf Ronge
- 1984: Alfred Stummer
- 1985: Alfred Stummer
- 1986: Alfred Stummer
- 1987: Alfred Stummer
- 1988: Alfred Stummer
- 1989: Alfred Stummer
- 1990: Alfred Stummer
- 1991: Alfred Stummer
- 1992: Alfred Stummer
- 1993: Alfred Stummer
- 1994: Michael Mayrhofer
- 1995: Alfred Stummer
- 1996: Klaus Biberauer
- 1997: Boris Bjanov
- 1998: Klaus Biberauer
- 1999: Boris Bjanov
- 2000: Boris Bjanov
- 2001: Boris Bjanov
- 2002: Klaus Biberauer
- 2003: Klaus Biberauer
- 2004: Klaus Biberauer
- 2005: Michael Mölschl
- 2006: Csaba Szekely

=== Shot put ===
- 1960: Alfred Tucek
- 1961: Hans Pötsch
- 1962: Werner Ehrlich
- 1963: Heimo Reinitzer
- 1964: Ernst Soudek
- 1965: Hannes Schulze-Bauer
- 1966: Hans Pötsch
- 1967: Hans Pötsch
- 1968: Hans Pötsch
- 1969: Hannes Schulze-Bauer
- 1970: Hans Pötsch
- 1971: Hannes Schulze-Bauer
- 1972: Heimo Reinitzer
- 1973: Hannes Schulze-Bauer
- 1974: Hermann Neudolt
- 1975: Wolf Bialonczyk
- 1976: Hermann Neudolt
- 1977: Hermann Neudolt
- 1978: Hermann Neudolt
- 1979: Erwin Weitzl
- 1980: Erwin Weitzl
- 1981: Erwin Weitzl
- 1982: Erwin Weitzl
- 1983: Erwin Weitzl
- 1984: Erwin Weitzl
- 1985: Erwin Weitzl
- 1986: Erwin Weitzl
- 1987: Klaus Bodenmüller
- 1988: Erwin Weitzl
- 1989: Klaus Bodenmüller
- 1990: Christian Nebl
- 1991: Klaus Bodenmüller
- 1992: Klaus Bodenmüller
- 1993: Klaus Bodenmüller
- 1994: Christian Nebl
- 1995: Christian Nebl
- 1996: Christian Nebl
- 1997: Andreas Vlasny
- 1998: Erwin Pirklbauer
- 1999: Andreas Vlasny
- 2000: Erwin Pirklbauer
- 2001: Andreas Vlasny
- 2002: Erwin Pirklbauer
- 2003: Erwin Pirklbauer
- 2004: Gerhard Zillner
- 2005: Gerhard Zillner
- 2006: Martin Gratzer

=== Discus throw ===
- 1960: Herbert Egermann
- 1961: Herbert Egermann
- 1962: Herbert Egermann
- 1963: Heimo Reinitzer
- 1964: Ernst Soudek
- 1965: Heimo Reinitzer
- 1966: Heimo Reinitzer
- 1967: Ernst Soudek
- 1968: Heimo Reinitzer
- 1969: Hans Matous
- 1970: Heimo Reinitzer
- 1971: Heimo Reinitzer
- 1972: Heimo Reinitzer
- 1973: Hans Matous
- 1974: Hans Matous
- 1975: Hans Matous
- 1976: Hans Matous
- 1977: Hans Matous
- 1978: Hans Matous
- 1979: Georg Frank
- 1980: Erwin Weitzl
- 1981: Georg Frank
- 1982: Arno Rupp
- 1983: Erwin Weitzl
- 1984: Arno Rupp
- 1985: Arno Rupp
- 1986: Erwin Weitzl
- 1987: Erwin Weitzl
- 1988: Erwin Weitzl
- 1989: Erwin Weitzl
- 1990: Erwin Weitzl
- 1991: Alfred Ramler
- 1992: Erwin Pirklbauer
- 1993: Erwin Pirklbauer
- 1994: Erwin Pirklbauer
- 1995: Erwin Pirklbauer
- 1996: Erwin Pirklbauer
- 1997: Erwin Pirklbauer
- 1998: Erwin Pirklbauer
- 1999: Erwin Pirklbauer
- 2000: Erwin Pirklbauer
- 2001: Gerhard Mayer
- 2002: Gerhard Mayer
- 2003: Gerhard Mayer
- 2004: Gerhard Mayer
- 2005: Gerhard Mayer
- 2006: Gerhard Mayer

=== Hammer throw ===
- 1960: Heinrich Thun
- 1961: Heinrich Thun
- 1962: Heinrich Thun
- 1963: Heinrich Thun
- 1964: Heinrich Thun
- 1965: Klaus Winter
- 1966: Heinrich Thun
- 1967: Hans Pötsch
- 1968: Hans Pötsch
- 1969: Hans Pötsch
- 1970: Hans Pötsch
- 1971: Hans Pötsch
- 1972: Peter Sternad
- 1973: Peter Sternad
- 1974: Peter Sternad
- 1975: Peter Sternad
- 1976: Peter Sternad
- 1977: Heimo Viertbauer
- 1978: Peter Sternad
- 1979: Peter Sternad
- 1980: Peter Sternad
- 1981: Johann Lindner
- 1982: Johann Lindner
- 1983: Johann Lindner
- 1984: Johann Lindner
- 1985: Johann Lindner
- 1986: Johann Lindner
- 1987: Johann Lindner
- 1988: Johann Lindner
- 1989: Johann Lindner
- 1990: Johann Lindner
- 1991: Johann Lindner
- 1992: Johann Lindner
- 1993: Johann Lindner
- 1994: Johann Lindner
- 1995: Walter Edletitsch
- 1996: Walter Edletitsch
- 1997: Walter Edletitsch
- 1998: Walter Edletitsch
- 1999: Walter Edletitsch
- 2000: Walter Edletitsch
- 2001: Walter Edletitsch
- 2002: Walter Edletitsch
- 2003: Walter Edletitsch
- 2004: Benjamin Siart
- 2005: Benjamin Siart
- 2006: Benjamin Siart

=== Javelin throw ===
- 1960: Franz Deboeuf
- 1961: Franz Löberbauer
- 1962: Franz Löberbauer
- 1963: Franz Löberbauer
- 1964: Walter Pektor
- 1965: Walter Pektor
- 1966: Walter Pektor
- 1967: Walter Pektor
- 1968: Walter Pektor
- 1969: Helmut Schönbichler
- 1970: Helmut Schönbichler
- 1971: Walter Pektor
- 1972: Karl Pregl
- 1973: Helmut Schönbichler
- 1974: Walter Pektor
- 1975: Walter Pektor
- 1976: Walter Pektor
- 1977: Wilhelm Malle
- 1978: Wilhelm Malle
- 1979: Georg Werthner
- 1980: Georg Werthner
- 1981: Georg Werthner
- 1982: Karl Pregl
- 1983: Georg Werthner
- 1984: Georg Werthner
- 1985: Wolfgang Spann
- 1986: Otto Petrovic
- 1987: Wolfgang Spann
- 1988: Georg Werthner
- 1989: Otto Petrovic
- 1990: Otto Petrovic
- 1991: Otto Petrovic
- 1992: Thomas Pichler
- 1993: Gregor Högler
- 1994: Gregor Högler
- 1995: Gregor Högler
- 1996: Gregor Högler
- 1997: Gregor Högler
- 1998: Gregor Högler
- 1999: Gregor Högler
- 2000: Gregor Högler
- 2001: Gregor Högler
- 2002: Gregor Högler
- 2003: Gregor Högler
- 2004: Max Linher
- 2005: Klaus Ambrosch
- 2006: Gregor Högler

=== Pentathlon ===
- 1960: Franz Löberbauer
- 1961: Herbert Egermann
- 1962: Franz Löberbauer
- 1963: Manfred Wicher
- 1964: Peter Schober
- 1965: Anselm Urbanek
- 1966: Robert Kropiunik
- 1967: Horst Mandl
- 1968: Horst Mandl
- 1969: Rainer Desch
- 1970: Rainer Desch
- 1971: Sepp Zeilbauer
- 1972: Rainer Desch

=== Decathlon ===
- 1960: Hans Muchitsch
- 1961: Hans Muchitsch
- 1962: Hans Muchitsch
- 1963: Horst Mandl
- 1964: Horst Mandl
- 1965: Horst Mandl
- 1966: Ingo Peyker
- 1967: Ingo Peyker
- 1968: Gert Herunter
- 1969: Horst Mandl
- 1970: Horst Mandl
- 1971: Horst Mandl
- 1972: Ingo Peyker
- 1973: Sepp Zeilbauer
- 1974: Sepp Zeilbauer
- 1975: Georg Werthner
- 1976: Sepp Zeilbauer
- 1977: Georg Werthner
- 1978: Sepp Zeilbauer
- 1979: Georg Werthner
- 1980: Georg Werthner
- 1981: Sepp Zeilbauer
- 1982: Georg Werthner
- 1983: Wolfgang Spann
- 1984: Georg Werthner
- 1985: Jürgen Mandl
- 1986: Georg Werthner
- 1987: Michael Arnold
- 1988: Georg Werthner
- 1989: Gernot Kellermayr
- 1990: Michael Arnold
- 1991: Erwin Reiterer
- 1992: Martin Krenn
- 1993: Leo Hudec
- 1994: Leo Hudec
- 1995: Gerhard Röser
- 1996: Thomas Tebbich
- 1997: Thomas Tebbich
- 1998: Klaus Ambrosch
- 1999: Klaus Ambrosch
- 2000: Thomas Lorber
- 2001: Markus Walser
- 2002: Klaus Ambrosch
- 2003: Roland Schwarzl
- 2004: Thomas Tebbich
- 2005: Markus Walser

=== 10,000 metres walk ===
- 1975: Wolfgang Burgstaller
- 1976: Wolfgang Burgstaller
- 1977: Wolfgang Burgstaller
- 1978: Johann Siegele
- 1979: Martin Toporek
- 1980: Martin Toporek

=== 20 kilometres walk ===
The course for the 2002 event was one kilometre too long.

- 1977: Wolfgang Burgstaller
- 1978: Johann Siegele
- 1979: Wilfried Siegele
- 1980: Wilfried Siegele
- 1981: Martin Toporek
- 1982: Martin Toporek
- 1983: Martin Toporek
- 1984: Martin Toporek
- 1985: Martin Toporek
- 1986: Martin Toporek
- 1987: Martin Toporek
- 1988: Stephan Wögerbauer
- 1989: Stephan Wögerbauer
- 1990: Martin Toporek
- 1991: Martin Toporek
- 1992: Stephan Wögerbauer
- 1993: Stephan Wögerbauer
- 1994: Stephan Wögerbauer
- 1995: Stephan Wögerbauer
- 1996: Stephan Wögerbauer
- 1997: Stephan Wögerbauer
- 1998: Stephan Wögerbauer
- 1999: Stephan Wögerbauer
- 2000: Stephan Wögerbauer
- 2001: Stephan Wögerbauer
- 2002: Stephan Wögerbauer
- 2003: Stephan Wögerbauer
- 2004: Norbert Jung
- 2005: Norbert Jung
- 2006: Norbert Jung

=== 50 kilometres walk ===
- 1980: Johann Siegele
- 1981: Wilfried Siegele
- 1982: Wilfried Siegele
- 1983: Wilfried Siegele
- 1984: Wilfried Siegele
- 1985: Johann Siegele
- 1986: Wilfried Siegele
- 1987: Stephan Wögerbauer
- 1988: Stephan Wögerbauer
- 1989: Stephan Wögerbauer
- 1990: Stephan Wögerbauer
- 1991: Martin Toporek
- 1992: Stephan Wögerbauer
- 1993: Stephan Wögerbauer
- 1994: Stephan Wögerbauer
- 1995: Stephan Wögerbauer
- 1996: Stephan Wögerbauer
- 1997: Stephan Wögerbauer
- 1998: Stephan Wögerbauer
- 1999: Stephan Wögerbauer
- 2000: Stephan Wögerbauer
- 2001: Stephan Wögerbauer
- 2002: Stephan Wögerbauer
- 2003: Stephan Wögerbauer
- 2004: Stephan Wögerbauer
- 2005: Dietmar Hirschmugl

=== Cross country (long course) ===
- 1960: Karl Lackner
- 1961: Karl Lackner
- 1962: Karl Lackner
- 1963: Horst Gansel
- 1964: Horst Gansel
- 1965: Horst Gansel
- 1966: Horst Gansel
- 1967: Hans Berger
- 1968: Manfred Wicher
- 1969: Hans Müller
- 1970: Hans Müller
- 1971: Hans Müller
- 1972: Hans Müller
- 1973: Hans Müller
- 1974: Richard Fink
- 1975: Dietmar Millonig
- 1976: Josef Steiner
- 1977: Heinrich Händlhuber
- 1978: Dietmar Millonig
- 1979: Dietmar Millonig
- 1980: Dietmar Millonig
- 1981: Gerhard Hartmann
- 1982: Gerhard Hartmann
- 1983: Gerhard Hartmann
- 1984: Gerhard Hartmann
- 1985: Gerhard Hartmann
- 1986: Gerhard Hartmann
- 1987: Gerhard Hartmann
- 1988: Gerhard Hartmann
- 1989: Gerhard Hartmann
- 1990: Gerhard Hartmann
- 1991: Gerhard Hartmann
- 1992: Gerhard Hartmann
- 1993: Dietmar Millonig
- 1994: Michael Buchleitner
- 1995: Helmut Schmuck
- 1996: Helmut Schmuck
- 1997: Michael Buchleitner
- 1998: Michael Buchleitner
- 1999: Helmut Schmuck
- 2000: Michael Buchleitner
- 2001: Günther Weidlinger
- 2002: Michael Buchleitner
- 2003: Günther Weidlinger
- 2004: Christian Pflügl
- 2005: Günther Weidlinger
- 2006: Günther Weidlinger

=== Cross country (short course) ===
- 1960: Laszlo Tanay
- 1961: Walter Steinbach
- 1962: Volker Tulzer
- 1963: Volker Tulzer
- 1964: Manfred Wicher
- 1965: Volker Tulzer
- 1966: Volker Tulzer
- 1967: Rudolf Klaban
- 1968: Heinrich Händlhuber
- 1969: Kurt Mayer
- 1970: Franz Graf
- 1971: Heinrich Händlhuber
- 1972: Herbert Tschernitz
- 1973: Heinrich Händlhuber
- 1974: Heinrich Händlhuber
- 1975: Heinrich Händlhuber
- 1976: Peter Lindtner
- 1977: Peter Lindtner
- 1978: Peter Lindtner
- 1979: Wolfgang Konrad
- 1980: Wolfgang Konrad
- 1981: Robert Nemeth
- 1982: Robert Nemeth
- 1983: Hannes Gruber
- 1984: Robert Nemeth
- 1985: Wolfgang Konrad
- 1986: Dietmar Millonig
- 1987: Robert Nemeth
- 1988: Wolfgang Konrad
- 1989: Thomas Fahringer
- 1990: Helmut Schmuck
- 1991: Michael Buchleitner & Bernhard Richter
- 1992: Bernhard Richter
- 1993: Bernhard Richter
- 1994: Bernhard Richter
- 1995: Bernhard Richter
- 1996: Wolfgang Fritz
- 1997: Thomas Ebner
- 1998: Günther Weidlinger
- 1999: Christian Pflügl
- 2000: Günther Weidlinger
- 2001: Günther Weidlinger
- 2002: Günther Weidlinger
- 2003: Günther Weidlinger
- 2004: Günther Weidlinger
- 2005: Günther Weidlinger
- 2006: Günther Weidlinger

=== Mountain running ===
- 1984: Erich Ammann
- 1985: Helmut Stuhlpfarrer
- 1986: Helmut Stuhlpfarrer
- 1987: Peter Schatz
- 1988: Helmut Schmuck
- 1989: Florian Stern
- 1990: Helmut Stuhlpfarrer
- 1991: Helmut Schmuck
- 1992: Karl Zisser
- 1993: Helmut Schmuck
- 1994: Helmut Schmuck
- 1995: Helmut Schmuck
- 1996: Helmut Schmuck
- 1997: Peter Schatz
- 1998: Helmut Schmuck
- 1999: Helmut Schmuck
- 2000: Helmut Schmuck
- 2001: Helmut Schmuck
- 2002: Alois Redl
- 2003: Helmut Schmuck
- 2004: Helmut Schmuck
- 2005: Florian Heinzle
- 2006: Alexander Rieder

== Women ==
=== 100 metres ===
- 1960: Ulla Flegel
- 1961: Monika Kager
- 1962: Dorli Tischner
- 1963: Heidi Lechleuthner
- 1964: Inge Aigner
- 1965: Helga Kapfer
- 1966: Helga Kapfer
- 1967: Helga Kapfer
- 1968: Inge Aigner
- 1969: Erika Kren
- 1970: Brigitte Ortner
- 1971: Helga Kapfer
- 1972: Karoline Käfer
- 1973: Karoline Käfer
- 1974: Karoline Käfer
- 1975: Karoline Käfer
- 1976: Brigitte Haest
- 1977: Karoline Käfer
- 1978: Karoline Käfer
- 1979: Brigitte Haest
- 1980: Karoline Käfer
- 1981: Petra Prenner
- 1982: Ingeborg Brüstle
- 1983: Karoline Käfer
- 1984: Sabine Seitl
- 1985: Gerda Haas
- 1986: Gerda Haas
- 1987: Elisabeth Norz
- 1988: Sabine Seitl
- 1989: Sabine Tröger
- 1990: Sabine Tröger
- 1991: Sabine Tröger
- 1992: Sabine Tröger
- 1993: Sabine Tröger
- 1994: Sabine Tröger
- 1995: Sabine Kirchmaier
- 1996: Sabine Kirchmaier
- 1997: Karin Mayr-Krifka
- 1998: Karin Mayr-Krifka
- 1999: Karin Mayr-Krifka
- 2000: Karin Mayr-Krifka
- 2001: Bettina Müller-Weissina
- 2002: Karin Mayr-Krifka
- 2003: Karin Mayr-Krifka
- 2004: Bettina Müller-Weissina
- 2005: Karin Mayr-Krifka
- 2006: Bettina Müller-Weissina

=== 200 metres ===
- 1960: Grete Bosnyak
- 1961: Erna Auer
- 1962: Monika Kager
- 1963: Heidi Lechleuthner
- 1964: Inge Aigner
- 1965: Inge Aigner
- 1966: Helga Kapfer
- 1967: Inge Aigner
- 1968: Inge Aigner
- 1969: Helga Kapfer
- 1970: Helga Kapfer
- 1971: Helga Kapfer
- 1972: Karoline Käfer
- 1973: Karoline Käfer
- 1974: Karoline Käfer
- 1975: Karoline Käfer
- 1976: Christiane Wildschek
- 1977: Karoline Käfer
- 1978: Karoline Käfer
- 1979: Karoline Käfer
- 1980: Karoline Käfer
- 1981: Elisabeth Petutschnig
- 1982: Elisabeth Petutschnig
- 1983: Karoline Käfer
- 1984: Grace Pardy
- 1985: Gerda Haas
- 1986: Gerda Haas
- 1987: Gerda Haas
- 1988: Gerda Haas
- 1989: Sabine Tröger
- 1990: Sabine Tröger
- 1991: Sabine Tröger
- 1992: Sabine Tröger
- 1993: Sabine Tröger
- 1994: Sabine Tröger
- 1995: Sabine Kirchmaier
- 1996: Sabine Kirchmaier
- 1997: Karin Mayr-Krifka
- 1998: Stefanie Hollweger
- 1999: Sabine Mick
- 2000: Karin Mayr-Krifka
- 2001: Bianca Dürr
- 2002: Karin Mayr-Krifka
- 2003: Karin Mayr-Krifka
- 2004: Karin Mayr-Krifka
- 2005: Karin Mayr-Krifka
- 2006: Doris Röser

=== 400 metres ===
- 1961: Maria Pfeiffer
- 1962: Maria Pfeiffer
- 1963: Bärbl Schatz
- 1964: Bärbl Schatz
- 1965: Bärbl Schatz
- 1966: Barbara Kulhanek
- 1967: Maria Sykora
- 1968: Maria Sykora
- 1969: Maria Sykora
- 1970: Maria Sykora
- 1971: Maria Sykora
- 1972: Karoline Käfer
- 1973: Karoline Käfer
- 1974: Karoline Käfer
- 1975: Karoline Käfer
- 1976: Christiane Wildschek
- 1977: Karoline Käfer
- 1978: Silvia Schinzel
- 1979: Karoline Käfer
- 1980: Karoline Käfer
- 1981: Elisabeth Petutschnig
- 1982: Karoline Käfer
- 1983: Karoline Käfer
- 1984: Gerda Haas
- 1985: Gerda Haas
- 1986: Gerda Haas
- 1987: Gerda Haas
- 1988: Gerda Haas
- 1989: Gerda Haas
- 1990: Gerda Haas
- 1991: Sabine Tröger
- 1992: Sabine Tröger
- 1993: Andrea Pospischek
- 1994: Stefanie Zotter
- 1995: Stefanie Zotter
- 1996: Sabine Kirchmaier
- 1997: Stephanie Graf
- 1998: Stephanie Graf
- 1999: Stephanie Graf
- 2000: Stephanie Graf
- 2001: Betina Germann
- 2002: Sabine Gasselseder
- 2003: Stephanie Graf
- 2004: Viktoria Steinmüller
- 2005: Sabine Kreiner
- 2006: Betina Germann

=== 800 metres ===
- 1960: Gaby Scholtes
- 1961: Maria Pfeiffer
- 1962: Bärbl Schatz
- 1963: Bärbl Schatz
- 1964: Bärbl Schatz
- 1965: Bärbl Schatz
- 1966: Hanna Biba
- 1967: Bärbl Schatz
- 1968: Maria Sykora
- 1969: Maria Sykora
- 1970: Sissy Brandnegger
- 1971: Maria Sykora
- 1972: Maria Sykora
- 1973: Christiane Wildschek
- 1974: Rita Graf
- 1975: Angelika Schrott
- 1976: Andrea Mühlbach
- 1977: Andrea Mühlbach
- 1978: Christiane Wildschek
- 1979: Christiane Wildschek
- 1980: Christiane Wildschek
- 1981: Anni Müller
- 1982: Doris Weilharter
- 1983: Marion Reiter
- 1984: Karoline Käfer
- 1985: Karoline Käfer
- 1986: Karoline Käfer
- 1987: Erika Zenz
- 1988: Ernestine Waldhör
- 1989: Theresia Kiesl
- 1990: Theresia Kiesl
- 1991: Theresia Kiesl
- 1992: Theresia Kiesl
- 1993: Theresia Kiesl
- 1994: Stephanie Graf
- 1995: Stephanie Graf
- 1996: Stephanie Graf
- 1997: Stephanie Graf
- 1998: Brigitte Mühlbacher
- 1999: Karin Walkner
- 2000: Brigitte Mühlbacher
- 2001: Brigitte Mühlbacher
- 2002: Brigitte Mühlbacher
- 2003: Brigitte Mühlbacher
- 2004: Elisabeth Niedereder
- 2005: Elisabeth Niedereder
- 2006: Pamela Märzendorfer

=== 1500 metres ===
- 1971: Friederike Schmid
- 1972: Angelika Schrott
- 1973: Doris Weilharter
- 1974: Angelika Schrott
- 1975: Angelika Schrott
- 1976: Anni Klemenjak
- 1977: Doris Weilharter
- 1978: Anni Klemenjak
- 1979: Anni Klemenjak
- 1980: Christiane Wildschek
- 1981: Doris Weilharter
- 1982: Doris Weilharter
- 1983: Doris Weilharter
- 1984: Anni Müller
- 1985: Anni Müller
- 1986: Anni Müller
- 1987: Anni Müller
- 1988: Erika Zenz
- 1989: Theresia Kiesl
- 1990: Erika Zenz
- 1991: Theresia Kiesl
- 1992: Theresia Kiesl
- 1993: Stephanie Graf
- 1994: Stephanie Graf
- 1995: Theresia Kiesl
- 1996: Brigitte Mühlbacher
- 1997: Theresia Kiesl
- 1998: Brigitte Mühlbacher
- 1999: Brigitte Mühlbacher
- 2000: Susanne Pumper
- 2001: Martina Winter
- 2002: Brigitte Mühlbacher
- 2003: Susanne Pumper
- 2004: Susanne Pumper
- 2005: Susanne Pumper
- 2006: Silvia Aschenberger

=== 3000 metres ===
- 1973: Anni Klemenjak
- 1974: Doris Weilharter
- 1975: Angelika Schrott
- 1976: Doris Weilharter
- 1977: Anni Klemenjak
- 1978: Anni Klemenjak
- 1979: Doris Weilharter
- 1980: Anni Müller
- 1981: Doris Weilharter
- 1982: Doris Weilharter
- 1983: Anni Müller
- 1984: Anni Müller
- 1985: Anni Müller
- 1986: Anni Müller
- 1987: Anni Müller
- 1988: Anni Müller
- 1989: Anni Müller
- 1990: Anni Müller
- 1991: Erika König-Zenz
- 1992: Elisabeth Singer
- 1993: Erika König-Zenz
- 1994: Erika König-Zenz
- 1995: Sandra Baumann

=== 5000 metres ===
- 1983: Anni Müller
- 1984: Anni Müller
- 1985: Not held
- 1986: Not held
- 1987: Not held
- 1988: Not held
- 1989: Not held
- 1990: Not held
- 1991: Not held
- 1992: Not held
- 1993: Not held
- 1994: Not held
- 1995: Not held
- 1996: Susanne Pumper
- 1997: Susanne Pumper
- 1998: Susanne Pumper
- 1999: Susanne Pumper
- 2000: Sandra Baumann
- 2001: Susanne Pumper
- 2002: Sandra Baumann
- 2003: Helene Eidenberger
- 2004: Eva Maria Gradwohl
- 2005: Susanne Pumper
- 2006: Susanne Pumper

=== 10,000 metres ===
- 1985: Anni Müller
- 1986: Carina Weber-Leutner
- 1987: Anni Müller
- 1988: Anni Müller
- 1989: Anni Müller
- 1990: Anni Müller
- 1991: Anni Müller
- 1992: Carina Weber-Leutner
- 1993: Susanne Fischer
- 1994: Carina Lilge-Leutner
- 1995: Sandra Baumann
- 1996: Anna Haderer
- 1997: Susanne Pumper
- 1998: Susanne Pumper
- 1999: Susanne Pumper
- 2000: Susanne Pumper
- 2001: Susanne Pumper
- 2002: Susanne Pumper
- 2003: Andrea Mayr
- 2004: Andrea Mayr
- 2005: Susanne Pumper
- 2006: Andrea Mayr

=== 10K run ===
- 1983: Maria Springer
- 1984: Anni Müller
- 1985: Not held
- 1986: Not held
- 1987: Not held
- 1988: Not held
- 1989: Not held
- 1990: Not held
- 1991: Not held
- 1992: Not held
- 1993: Not held
- 1994: Not held
- 1995: Not held
- 1996: Not held
- 1997: Not held
- 1998: Not held
- 1999: Not held
- 2000: Not held
- 2001: Not held
- 2002: Not held
- 2003: Not held
- 2004: Not held
- 2005: Martina Winter
- 2006: Andrea Mayr

=== 15K run ===
- 1985: Anni Müller
- 1986: Carina Weber-Leutner
- 1987: Verena Lechner
- 1988: Anni Müller
- 1989: Anni Müller
- 1990: Verena Lechner
- 1991: Carina Weber-Leutner

=== Half marathon ===
- 1992: Carina Weber-Leutner
- 1993: Elisabeth Rust
- 1994: Elisabeth Rust
- 1995: Carina Lilge-Leutner
- 1996: Anna Haderer
- 1997: Anna Haderer
- 1998: Ulrike Puchner
- 1999: Gudrun Pflüger
- 2000: Dagmar Rabensteiner
- 2001: Dagmar Rabensteiner
- 2002: Eva Maria Gradwohl
- 2003: Eva Maria Gradwohl
- 2004: Susanne Pumper
- 2005: Eva Maria Gradwohl

=== 25K run ===
1980: Andrea Zirknitzer 1982: Edith Sappl

=== Marathon ===
- 1983: Monika Frisch
- 1984: Monika Naskau
- 1985: Monika Frisch
- 1986: Ida Hellwagner
- 1987: Carina Weber-Leutner
- 1988: Carina Quintero
- 1989: Elisabeth Singer
- 1990: Carina Weber-Leutner
- 1991: Carina Weber-Leutner
- 1992: Andrea Hofmann
- 1993: Carina Lilge-Leutner
- 1994: Andrea Hofmann
- 1995: Elisabeth Rust
- 1996: Anna Haderer
- 1997: Ulrike Puchner
- 1998: Elisabeth Rust
- 1999: Karoline Dohr
- 2000: Dagmar Rabensteiner
- 2001: Ulrike Puchner
- 2002: Veronika Kienbichl
- 2003: Eva Maria Gradwohl
- 2004: Ingrid Eichberger
- 2005: Eva Maria Gradwohl
- 2006: Susanne Pumper

=== 3000 metres steeplechase ===
- 2001: Andrea Mayr
- 2002: Sandra Baumann
- 2003: Andrea Mayr
- 2004: Andrea Mayr
- 2005: Birgit Scheifinger
- 2006: Andrea Mayr

=== 80 metres hurdles ===
- 1960: Gertrude Fries
- 1961: Friedl Murauer
- 1962: Ulla Flegel
- 1963: Anneliese Schwendenwein
- 1964: Inge Aigner
- 1965: Inge Aigner
- 1966: Traude Weberschläger
- 1967: Inge Aigner
- 1968: Inge Aigner

=== 100 metres hurdles ===
- 1969: Liese Prokop
- 1970: Maria Sykora
- 1971: Doris Langhans
- 1972: Liese Prokop
- 1973: Doris Langhans
- 1974: Carmen Mähr
- 1975: Doris Langhans
- 1976: Carmen Pfanner
- 1977: Doris Mandl
- 1978: Petra Prenner
- 1979: Petra Prenner
- 1980: Petra Prenner
- 1981: Petra Prenner
- 1982: Petra Prenner
- 1983: Petra Prenner
- 1984: Sabine Seitl
- 1985: Sabine Seitl
- 1986: Sabine Seitl
- 1987: Ulrike Kleindl
- 1988: Sabine Seitl
- 1989: Sabine Seitl
- 1990: Ulrike Beierl
- 1991: Ulrike Beierl
- 1992: Gabriele Miklautsch
- 1993: Gabriele Miklautsch
- 1994: Elke Wölfling
- 1995: Karin Mayr-Krifka
- 1996: Elke Wölfling
- 1997: Elke Wölfling
- 1998: Elke Wölfling
- 1999: Elke Wölfling
- 2000: Elke Wölfling
- 2001: Daniela Wöckinger
- 2002: Daniela Wöckinger
- 2003: Elke Wölfling
- 2004: Lisi Maurer
- 2005: Daniela Wöckinger
- 2006: Lisi Maurer & Victoria Schreibeis

=== 400 metres hurdles ===
- 1976: Christiane Wildschek
- 1977: Andrea Mühlbach
- 1978: Christiane Wildschek
- 1979: Eveline Ledl
- 1980: Eveline Ledl
- 1981: Eveline Ledl
- 1982: Elisabeth Petutschnig
- 1983: Melitta Aigner
- 1984: Gerda Haas
- 1985: Gerda Haas
- 1986: Gerda Haas
- 1987: Gerda Haas
- 1988: Gerda Haas
- 1989: Gerda Haas
- 1990: Gerda Haas
- 1991: Stefanie Zotter
- 1992: Tamara Striessnig
- 1993: Andrea Pospischek
- 1994: Stefanie Zotter
- 1995: Stefanie Zotter
- 1996: Zsuzsanna Petö
- 1997: Zsuzsanna Petö
- 1998: Daniela Graiani
- 1999: Barbara Röser
- 2000: Pamela Märzendorfer
- 2001: Sabine Gasselseder
- 2002: Sabine Gasselseder
- 2003: Sabine Gasselseder
- 2004: Sarah Baier
- 2005: Sabine Kreiner
- 2006: Sabine Kreiner

=== High jump ===
- 1960: Marianne Linser
- 1961: Liese Sykora
- 1962: Liese Sykora
- 1963: Liese Sykora
- 1964: Ulla Flegel
- 1965: Liese Prokop
- 1966: Ilona Majdan
- 1967: Ilona Gusenbauer
- 1968: Ilona Gusenbauer
- 1969: Ilona Gusenbauer
- 1970: Ilona Gusenbauer
- 1971: Ilona Gusenbauer
- 1972: Ilona Gusenbauer
- 1973: Ilona Gusenbauer
- 1974: Margit Danninger
- 1975: Ilona Gusenbauer
- 1976: Ilona Gusenbauer
- 1977: Riki Lechner
- 1978: Isabella Rohrbacher
- 1979: Helga Pargfrieder
- 1980: Melitta Aigner
- 1981: Sabine Skvara
- 1982: Sigrid Kirchmann
- 1983: Sigrid Kirchmann
- 1984: Sigrid Kirchmann
- 1985: Sabine Skvara
- 1986: Sigrid Kirchmann
- 1987: Sigrid Kirchmann
- 1988: Sigrid Kirchmann
- 1989: Ulrike Kotzina
- 1990: Sigrid Kirchmann
- 1991: Sigrid Kirchmann
- 1992: Monika Gollner
- 1993: Sigrid Kirchmann
- 1994: Sigrid Kirchmann
- 1995: Monika Gollner
- 1996: Monika Gollner
- 1997: Linda Horvath
- 1998: Monika Gollner
- 1999: Linda Horvath
- 2000: Linda Horvath
- 2001: Katrin Schöftner
- 2002: Gudrun Fischbacher
- 2003: Alexandra Dreier
- 2004: Daniela Kreichbaum
- 2005: Monika Gollner
- 2006: Monika Gollner

=== Pole vault ===
The 1995 women's pole vault event did not have official championship status.

- 1995: Monika Erlach
- 1996: Doris Auer
- 1997: Doris Auer
- 1998: Monika Erlach
- 1999: Doris Auer
- 2000: Doris Auer
- 2001: Michaela Kohlbauer
- 2002: Carmen Klausbruckner
- 2003: Carmen Klausbruckner
- 2004: Brigitta Pöll
- 2005: Doris Auer
- 2006: Carmen Klausbruckner

=== Long jump ===
- 1960: Erna Auer
- 1961: Sieglinde Pfannerstill
- 1962: Sieglinde Pfannerstill
- 1963: Sieglinde Pfannerstill
- 1964: Susanne Lindner
- 1965: Sieglinde Pfannerstill
- 1966: Sieglinde Pfannerstill
- 1967: Hanna Kleinpeter
- 1968: Hanna Kleinpeter
- 1969: Hanna Kleinpeter
- 1970: Hanna Kleinpeter
- 1971: Hanna Kleinpeter
- 1972: Hanna Kleinpeter
- 1973: Hanna Kleinpeter
- 1974: Hanna Kleinpeter
- 1975: Liese Prokop
- 1976: Irmgard Hölzl
- 1977: Irmgard Wöckinger
- 1978: Irmgard Wöckinger
- 1979: Edith Maier
- 1980: Petra Prenner
- 1981: Petra Prenner
- 1982: Petra Prenner
- 1983: Edith Maier
- 1984: Sabine Seitl
- 1985: Petra Prenner
- 1986: Regina Helfenbein
- 1987: Regina Weiskopf
- 1988: Ulrike Kleindl
- 1989: Ulrike Kleindl
- 1990: Ulrike Kleindl
- 1991: Ljudmila Ninova
- 1992: Ljudmila Ninova
- 1993: Ljudmila Ninova
- 1994: Ljudmila Ninova
- 1995: Ljudmila Ninova
- 1996: Ljudmila Ninova
- 1997: Ljudmila Ninova
- 1998: Olivia Wöckinger
- 1999: Olivia Wöckinger
- 2000: Manuela Witting
- 2001: Bianca Dürr
- 2002: Olivia Wöckinger
- 2003: Olivia Wöckinger
- 2004: Olivia Wöckinger
- 2005: Bianca Dürr
- 2006: Bianca Dürr

=== Triple jump ===
- 1990: Silvia Mayramhof
- 1991: Gabriele Unger
- 1992: Gabriele Unger
- 1993: Gudrun Fischbacher
- 1994: Christina Öppinger
- 1995: Christina Öppinger
- 1996: Christina Öppinger
- 1997: Christina Öppinger
- 1998: Katrin Pieringer
- 1999: Anja Mandl
- 2000: Olivia Wöckinger
- 2001: Olivia Wöckinger
- 2002: Olivia Wöckinger
- 2003: Olivia Wöckinger
- 2004: Olivia Wöckinger
- 2005: Olivia Wöckinger
- 2006: Michaela Egger

=== Shot put ===
- 1960: Dorli Hofrichter
- 1961: Herlinde Peyker
- 1962: Gerlinde Anderle
- 1963: Dorli Hofrichter
- 1964: Gerlinde Anderle
- 1965: Gerlinde Anderle
- 1966: Gerlinde Anderle
- 1967: Gerlinde Anderle
- 1968: Eva Janko
- 1969: Liese Prokop
- 1970: Erika Hofer
- 1971: Erika Hofer
- 1972: Liese Prokop
- 1973: Liese Prokop
- 1974: Liese Prokop
- 1975: Liese Prokop
- 1976: Liese Prokop
- 1977: Riki Lechner
- 1978: Susanne Spacek
- 1979: Stefanie Jagenbrein
- 1980: Melitta Aigner
- 1981: Melitta Aigner
- 1982: Melitta Aigner
- 1983: Melitta Aigner
- 1984: Ursula Weber
- 1985: Maria Schramseis
- 1986: Veronika Längle
- 1987: Karin Danninger
- 1988: Veronika Längle
- 1989: Veronika Längle
- 1990: Veronika Längle
- 1991: Sonja Spendelhofer
- 1992: Sonja Spendelhofer
- 1993: Sabine Bieber
- 1994: Sonja Spendelhofer
- 1995: Sonja Spendelhofer
- 1996: Sonja Spendelhofer
- 1997: Sonja Spendelhofer
- 1998: Sonja Spendelhofer
- 1999: Valentina Fedyushina
- 2000: Valentina Fedyushina
- 2001: Valentina Fedyushina
- 2002: Valentina Fedyushina
- 2003: Valentina Fedyushina
- 2004: Valentina Fedyushina
- 2005: Veronika Watzek
- 2006: Veronika Watzek

=== Discus throw ===
- 1960: Dorli Hofrichter
- 1961: Dorli Hofrichter
- 1962: Dorli Hofrichter
- 1963: Dorli Hofrichter
- 1964: Gerlinde Anderle
- 1965: Gerlinde Anderle
- 1966: Gerlinde Anderle
- 1967: Gitta Signoretti
- 1968: Gitta Signoretti
- 1969: Gitta Signoretti
- 1970: Gitta Signoretti
- 1971: Gitta Signoretti
- 1972: Gitta Signoretti
- 1973: Gitta Signoretti
- 1974: Gitta Hubner
- 1975: Gitta Hubner
- 1976: Gitta Hubner
- 1977: Gitta Hubner
- 1978: Susanne Spacek
- 1979: Gitta Hubner
- 1980: Gitta Hubner
- 1981: Irene Habisohn
- 1982: Maria Schramseis
- 1983: Maria Schramseis
- 1984: Maria Schramseis
- 1985: Maria Schramseis
- 1986: Ursula Weber
- 1987: Ursula Weber
- 1988: Ursula Weber
- 1989: Ursula Weber
- 1990: Ursula Weber
- 1991: Ursula Weber
- 1992: Ursula Weber
- 1993: Ursula Weber
- 1994: Maria Schramseis
- 1995: Sonja Spendelhofer
- 1996: Sonja Spendelhofer
- 1997: Sonja Spendelhofer
- 1998: Petra Feierfeilova
- 1999: Petra Feierfeilova
- 2000: Claudia Stern
- 2001: Sonja Spendelhofer
- 2002: Sonja Spendelhofer
- 2003: Sonja Spendelhofer
- 2004: Veronika Watzek
- 2005: Veronika Watzek
- 2006: Veronika Watzek

=== Hammer throw ===
The 1995 women's hammer throw event did not have official championship status.

- 1995: Claudia Stern
- 1996: Claudia Stern
- 1997: Claudia Stern
- 1998: Claudia Stern
- 1999: Claudia Stern
- 2000: Claudia Stern
- 2001: Claudia Stern
- 2002: Ute Atzmanniger
- 2003: Claudia Stern
- 2004: Claudia Stern
- 2005: Claudia Stern
- 2006: Claudia Stern

=== Javelin throw ===
- 1960: Traudl Schönauer
- 1961: Erika Strasser
- 1962: Erika Strasser
- 1963: Erika Strasser
- 1964: Traudl Schönauer
- 1965: Erika Strasser
- 1966: Eva Janko
- 1967: Erika Strasser
- 1968: Eva Janko
- 1969: Erika Strasser
- 1970: Eva Janko
- 1971: Inge Reiger
- 1972: Eva Janko
- 1973: Eva Janko
- 1974: Eva Janko
- 1975: Eva Janko
- 1976: Eva Janko
- 1977: Eva Janko
- 1978: Eva Janko
- 1979: Eva Janko
- 1980: Eva Janko
- 1981: Eva Janko
- 1982: Eva Janko
- 1983: Veronika Längle
- 1984: Veronika Längle
- 1985: Lisbeth Kucher
- 1986: Lisbeth Kucher
- 1987: Lisbeth Mischkounig
- 1988: Lisbeth Mischkounig
- 1989: Lisbeth Mischkounig
- 1990: Lisbeth Kucher
- 1991: Lisbeth Kucher
- 1992: Monika Brodschneider
- 1993: Monika Brodschneider
- 1994: Monika Brodschneider
- 1995: Monika Brodschneider
- 1996: Monika Brodschneider
- 1997: Monika Brodschneider
- 1998: Barbara Strass
- 1999: Sophia Bolzano
- 2000: Monika Brodschneider
- 2001: Ulrike Kalss
- 2002: Marion Obermayr
- 2003: Veronika Rösing
- 2004: Simone Igl
- 2005: Andrea Lindenthaler
- 2006: Elisabeth Eberl

=== Pentathlon ===
- 1960: Ulla Flegel
- 1961: Erna Auer
- 1962: Ulla Flegel
- 1963: Ulla Flegel
- 1964: Liese Sykora
- 1965: Liese Prokop
- 1966: Liese Prokop
- 1967: Eva Janko
- 1968: Liese Prokop
- 1969: Liese Prokop
- 1970: Maria Sykora
- 1971: Maria Sykora
- 1972: Eva Janko
- 1973: Liese Prokop
- 1974: Liese Prokop
- 1975: Liese Prokop
- 1976: Karin Danninger
- 1977: Riki Lechner
- 1978: Margit Danninger
- 1979: Helga Pargfrieder
- 1980: Melitta Aigner

=== Heptathlon ===
- 1981: Melitta Aigner
- 1982: Petra Prenner
- 1983: Melitta Aigner
- 1984: Beate Osterer
- 1985: Beate Osterer
- 1986: Sigrid Kirchmann
- 1987: Beate Krawcewicz
- 1988: Beate Krawcewicz
- 1989: Anni Spitzbart
- 1990: Beate Krawcewicz
- 1991: Kirsten Wakolbinger
- 1992: Doris Auer
- 1993: Christina Öppinger
- 1994: Sigrid Kirchmann
- 1995: Sabine Kirchmaier
- 1996: Bianca Dürr
- 1997: Bianca Dürr
- 1998: Bianca Dürr
- 1999: Marion Obermayr
- 2000: Marion Obermayr
- 2001: Ulrike Kalss
- 2002: Marion Obermayr
- 2003: Elisabeth Plazotta
- 2004: Elisabeth Plazotta
- 2005: Victoria Schreibeis

=== 10 kilometres walk ===
The race 2002 was overly long by 500 m due to an organisational error.

- 1989: Elisabeth Siegele
- 1990: Viera Toporek
- 1991: Viera Toporek
- 1992: Viera Toporek
- 1993: Viera Toporek
- 1994: Viera Toporek
- 1995: Viera Toporek
- 1996: Viera Toporek
- 1997: Elisabeth Siegele
- 1998: Viera Toporek
- 1999: Viera Toporek
- 2000: Viera Toporek
- 2001: Viera Toporek
- 2002: Viera Toporek
- 2003: Viera Toporek
- 2004: Viera Toporek
- 2005: Gabriela Winkler
- 2006: Viera Toporek

=== 20 kilometres walk ===
- 2003: Viera Toporek

=== Cross country ===
- 1960: Gaby Scholtes
- 1961: Maria Pfeiffer
- 1962: Bärbl Schatz
- 1963: Bärbl Schatz
- 1964: Bärbl Schatz
- 1965: Bärbl Schatz
- 1966: Heidi Ludwig
- 1967: Bärbl Schatz
- 1968: Maria Sykora
- 1969: Maria Sykora
- 1970: Maria Sykora
- 1971: Maria Sykora
- 1972: Angelika Schrott
- 1973: Angelika Schrott
- 1974: Angelika Schrott
- 1975: Angelika Schrott
- 1976: Angelika Schrott
- 1977: Margit Bichlbauer
- 1978: Anni Klemenjak
- 1979: Brigitte Sattlberger
- 1980: Anni Müller
- 1981: Doris Weilharter
- 1982: Maria Springer
- 1983: Maria Springer
- 1984: Anni Müller
- 1985: Anni Müller
- 1986: Anni Müller
- 1987: Verena Lechner
- 1988: Marion Feigl
- 1989: Anni Müller
- 1990: Verena Lechner
- 1991: Verena Lechner
- 1992: Elisabeth Hofer
- 1993: Susanne Fischer
- 1994: Gudrun Pflüger
- 1995: Viera Toporek
- 1996: Gudrun Pflüger
- 1997: Gudrun Pflüger
- 1998: Susanne Pumper
- 1999: Gudrun Pflüger
- 2000: Sandra Baumann
- 2001: Sandra Baumann
- 2002: Sandra Baumann
- 2003: Sandra Baumann
- 2004: Sandra Baumann
- 2005: Andrea Mayr
- 2006: Andrea Mayr

=== Mountain running ===
- 1984: Monika Frisch
- 1985: Andrea Zirknitzer
- 1986: Andrea Zirknitzer
- 1987: Anni Oberhofer
- 1988: Anni Oberhofer
- 1989: Elisabeth Singer
- 1990: Verena Lechner
- 1991: Carina Weber-Leutner
- 1992: Sabine Stelzmüller
- 1993: Elisabeth Rust
- 1994: Elisabeth Rust
- 1995: Gudrun Pflüger
- 1996: Gudrun Pflüger
- 1997: Karoline Käfer
- 1998: Franziska Krösbacher
- 1999: Karoline Käfer
- 2000: Elisabeth Rust
- 2001: Elisabeth Rust
- 2002: Andrea Mayr
- 2003: Andrea Mayr
- 2004: Sandra Baumann
- 2005: Sandra Baumann
- 2006: Andrea Mayr
