= Austria at the 1968 Summer Olympics =

- IOC code: AUT
- NOC: Austrian Olympic Committee

in Mexico City
- Competitors: 43 (35 men and 8 women) in 12 sports
- Flag bearer: Roland Losert
- Medals Ranked 32nd: Gold 0 Silver 2 Bronze 2 Total 4

Summer Olympics appearances (overview)
- 1896; 1900; ~~1904~~; 1908; 1912; 1920; 1924; 1928; 1932; 1936; 1948; 1952; 1956; 1960; 1964; 1968; 1972; 1976; 1980; 1984; 1988; 1992; 1996; 2000; 2004; 2008; 2012; 2016; 2020; 2024; 2028

Other related appearances
- 1906 Intercalated Games

Austria competed at the 1968 Summer Olympics in Mexico City, Mexico. 43 competitors, 38 men and 8 women, took part in 37 events in 12 sports.

== Medalists ==
Medal	Name	Sport	Event
Silver	Hubert Raudaschl	Sailing	Men's Finn Competition
Silver	Liese Prokop	Athletics	Women's Pentathlon
Bronze	Eva Janko	Athletics	Women's Javelin Throw
Bronze	Günther Pfaff; Gerhard Seibold	Canoeing	Men's K2 1.000m Kayak Pairs

== Athletics ==
Key

- Note–Ranks given for track events are within the athlete's heat only
- Q = Qualified for the next round
- q = Qualified for the next round as a fastest loser

Men
Track & road events

Athlete	Event	Heat		Semifinal		Final	
Athlete	Event	Result	Rank	Result	Rank	Result	Rank
Rudolf Klaban	1500 m	3:59.11	8	Did not advance			

Field events

Athlete	Event	Qualification		Final	
Athlete	Event	Result	Rank	Result	Rank
Heimo Reinitzer	Discus throw	53.52	22	Did not advance	
Walter Pektor	Javelin throw	82.16	4 Q	77.40	10

Combined events – Decathlon

Athlete	100 m	LJ	SP	HJ	400 m	110 m H	DT	PV	JT	1500 m	Final	Rank
Walter Dießl	10.7	7.42	14.32	1.83	51.6	14.7w	42.23	4.25	55.38	5:19.7	7465	12
Gert Herunter	10.5	6.75	13.93	1.83	49.7	15.0	40.38	DNF				
Horst Mandl	11.2	7.04	13.34	DNF								

Women
Track & road events

Athlete	Event	Heat		Semifinal		Final	
Athlete	Event	Result	Rank	Result	Rank	Result	Rank
Inge Aigner	80 m hurdles	10.8	4 q	11.1	8	Did not advance	

Field events

Athlete	Event	Qualification		Final	
Athlete	Event	Result	Rank	Result	Rank
Ilona Gusenbauer	High jump	1.74	2 Q	Did not advance	
Eva Janko	Javelin throw	—N/a		58.04	3rd place, bronze medalist(s)

Combined events – Pentathlon

Athlete	Event	80H	SP	HJ	LJ	200 m	Final	Rank
Liese Prokop	Result	1011	1023	1027	982	923	4966	2nd place, silver medalist(s)
Liese Prokop	Points	112	1461	168	597	251	4966	2nd place, silver medalist(s)

== Diving ==
Women

Athlete	Event	Preliminary		Final			
Athlete	Event	Points	Rank	Points	Rank	Total	Rank
Ingeborg Pertmayr	3 m springboard	79.08	19	Did not advance			
Ingeborg Pertmayr	10 m platform	48.23	5 Q	41.20	9	89.43	9

== Fencing ==
Five fencers, all men, represented Austria in 1968.

Men's foil

- Roland Losert
- Udo Birnbaum
- Rudolf Trost

Men's épée

- Herbert Polzhuber
- Rudolf Trost
- Roland Losert

Men's team épée

- Udo Birnbaum, Roland Losert, Herbert Polzhuber, Frank Battig

== Modern pentathlon ==
Three male pentathletes represented Austria in 1968.

Individual

- Wolf-Dietrich Sonnleitner
- Siegfried Springer
- Wolfgang Leu

Team

- Wolf-Dietrich Sonnleitner
- Siegfried Springer
- Wolfgang Leu

== Sailing ==
Open

Athlete	Event	Race							Net points	Final rank
Athlete	Event	1	2	3	4	5	6	7	Net points	Final rank
Hubert Raudaschl	Finn	~~14~~	3	3	4	4	4	12	53.4	Silver medal
Karl Geiger; Werner Fischer	Flying Dutchman	18	15	10	16	16	12	11	116	17

== Shooting ==
Five shooters, all men, represented Austria in 1968.

Open

Athlete	Event	Final	
Athlete	Event	Score	Rank
Hubert Garschall	50 m free pistol	547	18
Hubert Garschall	25 m rapid fire pistol	579	30
Guido Loacker	50 m rifle three positions	1146	14
Josef Meixner	Trap	187	37
Friedrich Schattleitner	50 m rifle prone	590	35
Wolfram Waibel, Sr.	50 m rifle three positions	1133	32
Wolfram Waibel, Sr.	50 m rifle prone	587	53

== Swimming ==
Men

Athlete	Event	Heat		Semifinal		Final	
Athlete	Event	Time	Rank	Time	Rank	Time	Rank
Peter Schmid	100 m freestyle	57.1	41	Did not advance			
Peter Schmid	200 m individual medley	2:36.4	39	—N/a		Did not advance	

Women

Athlete	Event	Heat		Semifinal		Final	
Athlete	Event	Time	Rank	Time	Rank	Time	Rank
Yvette Hafner	100 m backstroke	1:11.8	=18	Did not advance			
Yvette Hafner	200 m backstroke	2:37.7	16	—N/a		Did not advance	
Christl Filippovits	100 m breaststroke	1:19.9	14 Q	1:18.9	12	Did not advance	
Christl Filippovits	200 m breaststroke	2:51.3	10	—N/a		Did not advance	
