= Athletics at the 1961 Summer Universiade – Men's 1500 metres =

The men's 1500 metres event at the 1961 Summer Universiade was held at the Vasil Levski National Stadium in Sofia, Bulgaria, with the final on 3 September 1961.

== Medalists ==
| Gold | Silver | Bronze |
|---|---|---|
| Tomáš Salinger; Czechoslovakia | Zoltan Vamoş; Romania | Rudolf Klaban; Austria |

== Results ==
=== Heats ===
| Rank | Heat | Name | Nationality | Time | Notes |
|---|---|---|---|---|---|
| 2 | 1 | Tomáš Salinger | Czechoslovakia | 3:52.2 | Q |
| 3 | 1 | Lech Boguszewicz | Poland | 3:52.4 | Q |
| 4 | 1 | John Boulter | Great Britain | 3:55.3 | q |
| 5 | 1 | Luc Baeyens | Belgium | 3:58.7 | q |
| 6 | 1 | Karl Eyerkaufer | West Germany | 3:58.8 | q |
| 7 | 1 | Volker Tulzer | Austria | 3:59.0 | q |
| 1 | 2 | Rudolf Klaban | Austria | 3:53.1 | Q |
| 2 | 2 | Stylian Kostov | Bulgaria | 3:53.3 | Q |
| 3 | 2 | Bolesław Kowalczyk | Poland | 3:58.5 | Q |
| 4 | 2 | Colin Shillington | Great Britain | 3:59.0 | q |
| 1 | 3 | Karl-Heinz Czock | West Germany | 3:53.1 | Q |
| 2 | 3 | Valentin Karaulov | Soviet Union | 3:58.3 | Q |
| 3 | 3 | Norbert Haupert | Luxembourg | 3:58.7 | Q |
| 4 | 3 | Dimitar Angelov | Bulgaria | 4:00.9 | |
| 5 | 3 | Sokol Morina | Albania | 4:01.4 | |

=== Final ===
| Rank | Athlete | Nationality | Time | Notes |
|---|---|---|---|---|
| 1st place, gold medalist(s) | Tomáš Salinger | Czechoslovakia | 3:45.75 | |
| 2nd place, silver medalist(s) | Zoltan Vamoş | Romania | 3:45.85 | |
| 3rd place, bronze medalist(s) | Rudolf Klaban | Austria | 3:46.16 | |
| 4 | Valentin Karaulov | Soviet Union | 3:48.05 | |
| 5 | Karl-Heinz Czock | West Germany | 3:48.32 | |
| 6 | Lech Boguszewicz | Poland | 3:48.79 | |
| 7 | Bolesław Kowalczyk | Poland | 3:50.0 | |
| 8 | Karl Eyerkaufer | West Germany | 3:50.3 | |
| 9 | Luc Baeyens | Belgium | 3:51.5 | |
| 10 | Norbert Haupert | Luxembourg | 3:55.8 | |
| 11 | Colin Shillington | Great Britain | 3:58.3 | |
| | John Boulter | Great Britain | DNS | |
| | Volker Tulzer | Austria | DNS | |
| | Stylian Kostov | Bulgaria | DNS | |
