= Siegele =

Siegele is a surname. Notable people with the surname include:

- Greg Siegele, Australian video game developer
- Johann Siegele (born 1948), Austrian racewalker
- Josef Siegele, Austrian politician
- Wilfried Siegele (born 1958), Austrian racewalker

== See also ==
- Leonore Siegele-Wenschkewitz (1944–1999), German historian
