= 1969 European Indoor Games – Women's 4 × 195 metres relay =

The women's 4 × 195 metres relay event at the 1969 European Indoor Games was held on 9 March in Belgrade. Each athlete ran one lap of the 195 metres track.

== Results ==
Rank	Nation	Competitors	Time	Notes
1st place, gold medalist(s)	France	Odette Ducas; Sylviane Telliez; Colette Besson; Christiane Martinetto	1:34.3	
2nd place, silver medalist(s)	Soviet Union	Galina Bukharina; Vera Popkova; Lyudmila Golomazova; Lyudmila Samotyosova	1:34.6	
3rd place, bronze medalist(s)	Yugoslavia	Darja Marolt; Verica Ambrozi; Ljiljana Petnjarić; Marijana Lubej	1:36.9	
4	Austria	Inge Aigner; Maria Sykora; Liesel Prokop; Hanna Kleinpeter	1:42.0	
