= Athletics at the 1975 Summer Universiade – Women's 200 metres =

The men's 200 metres event at the 1975 Summer Universiade was held at the Stadio Olimpico in Rome on 20 and 21 September.

== Medalists ==
Gold	Silver	Bronze
Pirjo Häggman; Finland	Mona-Lisa Pursiainen; Finland	Jelica Pavličić; Yugoslavia

== Results ==
=== Heats ===
Wind:
Heat 3: 0.0 m/s

Rank	Heat	Athlete	Nationality	Time	Notes
1	1	Mona-Lisa Pursiainen	Finland	23.82	Q
2	2	Barbara Bakulin	Poland	23.84	Q
3	2	Jelica Pavličić	Yugoslavia	23.89	Q
4	3	Aniela Szubert	Poland	24.13	Q
5	2	Patty Loverock	Canada	24.19	q
6	1	Lilyana Panayotova	Bulgaria	24.21	Q
7	3	Pirjo Häggman	Finland	24.45	Q
8	1	Christiane Casapicola	Austria	24.57	q
9	3	Danielle Camus	France	24.71	
10	1	Paula Lloyd	Great Britain	24.73	
11	2	Mariti de Voeght	Belgium	24.77	
12	3	Alessandra Orselli	Italy	24.88	
13	2	Jackie Stokoe	Great Britain	25.38	
14	2	Kemi Sangodeyi	Nigeria	25.46	
15	3	Silvia Hormazabal	Chile	25.93	
16	1	Zahra Hosseini	Iran	26.63	

=== Final ===
Wind: 0.0 m/s

Rank	Athlete	Nationality	Time	Notes
1st place, gold medalist(s)	Pirjo Häggman	Finland	23.38	
2nd place, silver medalist(s)	Mona-Lisa Pursiainen	Finland	23.61	
3rd place, bronze medalist(s)	Jelica Pavličić	Yugoslavia	23.78	
4	Aniela Szubert	Poland	23.83	
5	Patty Loverock	Canada	23.97	
6	Barbara Bakulin	Poland	23.99	
7	Lilyana Panayotova	Bulgaria	24.18	
	Christiane Casapicola	Austria	DNS	
