= 1979 European Athletics Indoor Championships – Men's 3000 metres =

The men's 3000 metres event at the 1979 European Athletics Indoor Championships was held on 25 February in Vienna.

== Results ==
Rank	Name	Nationality	Time	Notes
1st place, gold medalist(s)	Markus Ryffel	Switzerland	7:44.43	CR, NR
2nd place, silver medalist(s)	Christoph Herle	West Germany	7:45.44	SB
3rd place, bronze medalist(s)	Aleksandr Fedotkin	Soviet Union	7:45.50	NR
4	Andreas Bäsig	East Germany	7:45.6	PB
5	Nick Rose	Great Britain	7:46.7	PB
6	Dietmar Millonig	Austria	7:47.5	PB
7	Francis Gonzalez	France	7:51.9	PB
8	Mariano Scartezzini	Italy	7:53.3	PB
9	Joost Borm	Netherlands	7:58.4	PB
10	Bo Nytofle	Denmark	8:10.8	PB
11	Wolfgang Konrad	Austria	8:14.0	SB
