= Aleksandr Fedotkin =

Medal record

Men's athletics

Representing Soviet Union

European Championships
Silver medal – second place	1978 Prague	5000 m

European Indoor Championships
Bronze medal – third place	1979 Vienna	3000 m

Aleksandr Fedotkin (Russian: Алекса́ндр Федо́ткин; November 3, 1955 – 1997) was a long-distance runner who represented the Soviet Union. He won a silver medal at the 1978 European Athletics Championships, tied with Markus Ryffel, as well as a bronze medal at the 1979 European Athletics Indoor Championships, 5,000 meters final

== Achievements ==
Year	Tournament	Venue	Result	Extra
1977	World Cross Country Championships	Düsseldorf, West Germany	3rd	Long course team
1978	European Championships	Prague, Czechoslovakia	2nd	5000 m
	World Cross Country Championships	Glasgow, Scotland	4th	Long course team
1979	European Indoor Championships	Vienna, Austria	3rd	3000 m
