= Masters M40 high jump world record progression =

This is the progression of world record improvements of the high jump M40 division of Masters athletics.

Key

Incomplete information Pending Indoor mark before 2000, not acceptable for record

Height	Athlete	Nationality	Birthdate	Location	Date	Video
2.28	Dragutin Topić	Serbia	12.03.1971	Beograd	20.05.2012	
2.21	Dragutin Topić	Serbia	12.03.1971	Kragujevac	25.06.2011	
2.15	Glen Conley	United States	09.01.1957	Albany	02.08.1997	
2.11	Jim Barrineau	United States	25.06.1955	Buffalo	19.07.1995	
2.10 i	Dwight Stones	United States	06.12.1953	Indianapolis	25.03.1994	
2.07	Istvan Major	Hungary	20.05.1949	Budapest	02.07.1990	
2.06A	John Hartfield	United States	01.11.1944	Fort Collins	01.09.1985	
2.03	John Dobroth	United States	19.05.1941	Los Angeles	08.07.1981	
2.02	Horst Mandl	Austria	08.01.1936	Graz	03.07.1976	
