= Christoph Herle =

German long-distance runner

Medal record

Men's athletics

Representing West Germany

European Indoor Championships
Silver medal – second place	1979 Vienna	3000 m

Christoph Herle (born 19 November 1955 in Königstein im Taunus, Hessen) is a retired West German long-distance runner who specialized in the 10000 metres and cross-country running. His first major international track race occurred in the 1978 European Athletics Championships in Prague, former Czechoslovakia, where he placed fourteenth in the 5,000-metre final (see Tapio Pekola et al., eds., "European Championships Prague" / EM-Praha, Kaarina, Finland: Publications Company Runner / Juoksija, 1978). He ran slightly better in the 1982 European Athletics Championships 5,000-metre final in Athens, Greece, placing thirteenth (see Markku Siukonen and Matti Aho, eds., "The Great European Championships Book" / Suuri EM-kirja, Jyväskylä, Finland: Sportti Kustannus / Sport Publications Oy / Ltd., 1990). Herle ran best in 1983 and 1984, placing eighth at the 1983 World Championships in Athletics – Men's 10,000 metres in Helsinki, Finland (see, for example, Mikko S. Laitinen et al., eds., "World Athletics Championships 1983" / Yleisurheilun maailmanmestaruuskilpailut 1983, Salt Lake City, Utah, USA: International Sport Publications, 1983), and fifth at the final in the Athletics at the 1984 Summer Olympics – Men's 10,000 metres final in Los Angeles, the United States (see, for example, "The Big Olympic Book 4" / Suuri Olympiateos 4, published in Finland in 1984). He never managed to break through to the very top of international long-distance runners, however. His final major international championships race was the 1986 European Athletics Championships 10,000-metre race in Stuttgart, then West Germany, where he placed a disappointed fifteenth (see Siukonen and Aho, eds., "The Great European Championships Book").

== Achievements ==
Year	Competition	Venue	Position	Event	Notes
Representing West Germany
1978	World Cross Country Championships	Glasgow, Scotland	16th	Long race	
1978	World Cross Country Championships	Glasgow, Scotland	7th	Team	
1979	European Indoor Championships	Vienna, Austria	2nd	3000 m	
1979	World Cross Country Championships	Limerick, Ireland	16th	Long race	
1979	World Cross Country Championships	Limerick, Ireland	4th	Team	
1981	European Indoor Championships	Grenoble, France	5th	3000 m	
1983	World Championships	Helsinki, Finland	8th	10,000 m	
1984	World Cross Country Championships	New York City, United States	12th	Long race	
1984	World Cross Country Championships	New York City, United States	11th	Team	
1984	Olympic Games	Los Angeles, United States	5th	10,000 m	
1985	World Indoor Games	Paris, France	7th	3000 m	
1985	World Cross Country Championships	Lisbon, Portugal	7th	Long race	
1985	World Cross Country Championships	Lisbon, Portugal	11th	Team	
