= Gert Nöster =

Austrian sprinter

Personal information
- Nationality: Austrian
- Born: 10 April 1940 (age 86)

Sport
- Sport: Sprinting
- Event: 4 × 100 metres relay

Gert Nöster (born 10 April 1940) is an Austrian sprinter. He competed in the men's 4 × 100 metres relay at the 1972 Summer Olympics.
