= Maria Springer =

Polish female poet (1824–1872)

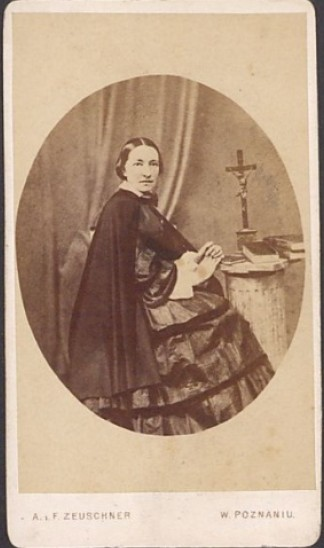
- Maria Springer ca 1872
- Born: 21 November 1824; Bromberg, Kingdom of Prussia
- Died: 6 February 1872 (aged 47); Gniezno, Kingdom of Prussia
- Resting place: Holy Cross Cemetery, Gniezno
- Occupations: poet, philanthropist, fashion designer
- Writing career
- Pen name: Maria z Gniezna
- Language: Polish

Maria Springer, aka Maria z Gniezna, (1824–1872) was a Polish poet, philanthropist and fashion designer.

== Life ==
Maria was born in Bydgoszcz in 1824 to Adolf Springer, a judge, and Nepomucena née Jelnicka, a teacher.

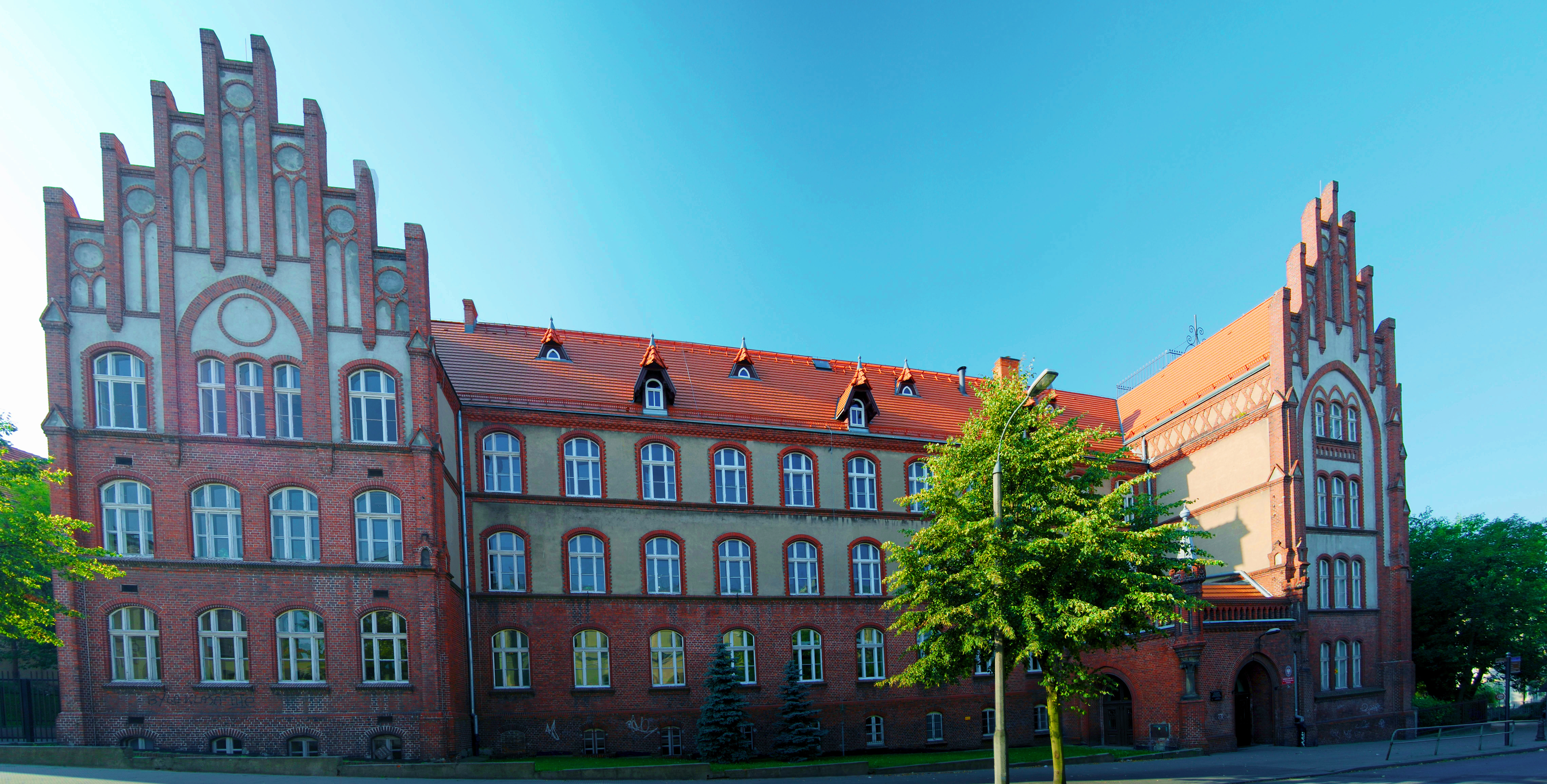
St. John's Municipal School, Gniezno

Her father died when she was 3 years old (1827), while the family was in Krotoszyn, where Adolf Springer was a lawyer. As a result, her mother, Nepomucena, moved to Gniezno with Maria and her sister Gabriela. There, the sisters attended St. John's Municipal School.

In order to sustain the family, Nepomucena took a job as a needlework teacher at the same school. Simultaneously, Maria started to take poetry lessons; she studied, among others, under the supervision of Father Kidaszewski (1801–1849) and Karol Ney (1809–1850), a writer, illustrator and rector of St. John's School.

Maria could observe in her lifetime two uprisings of the Polish people against the Kingdom of Prussia in Wielkopolska, in 1846 and 1848.

In Gniezno, Maria's mother founded the first fabric shop of the city located on the main square (Rynek). From 1848 onwards, Maria, together with her mother and sister, have been running the retail establishment selling clothing and tailoring materials. They regularly donated a major part of their profit to help the poor and schoolchildren. When her mother died, Maria took over the store and designed exceptionally chic outfits, creating new patterns, dresses and hats.

Polish poet and novelist Jadwiga Łuszczewska, known as Deotyma, befriended Maria Springer during her stay in Gniezno. Deotyma ran a lively social salon in Warsaw in parallel to her literary work, which helped Springer to find an audience in the Polish capital. Maria even designed some hats that Łuszczewska wore.

Maria Springer never married nor had any children. She died of tuberculosis on 6 February 1872. She was buried in the family burial vault at the Holy Cross Cemetery in Gniezno.

After Maria's death, her sister Gabriela died in 1891. The capital interests of their establishment helped finance orphanages in Bydgoszcz as well as in Gniezno (which still operates today). Funds went also to the benefit of the Scientific Aid Society (Towarzystwo Naukowej Pomocy) in Poznań.

In 1974, Gniezno celebrated the 150th birthday of Maria Springer: the event was chaired by Bishop Józef Glemp.

== Poetry ==
Springer's work was influenced by the patriotic experiences from the Polish uprisings she witnessed. Additionally, she was particularly sensitive to the issues of social inequality.

Maria Springer was closer to mystical poetics than to typically devotional religious poetry. Her texts incorporate phrases from the narrative of St. John of the Cross, from whom she borrows metaphors of light and dark night.

Maria of Gniezno, as Maria Springer signed her works, is an unknown author to the general public. She is mentioned only in highly specialized historical and literary studies, and her work has been analyzed by a small group of experts of the period. Her poems are not widely available, although contemporaries wanted to see her alongside Maria Konopnicka.

— Tomasz Rzepa, Przewodnik Katolicki, (1981)

=== Works ===
- Poezje Maryi z Gniezna – Poetry of Marie from Gniezno, Gniezno, 1849;
- Poezji religijnych – (Religious poetry), three volumes, Poznań, 1854–1857. One of the poems includes a reminder of Poland's 900th anniversary. The poet describes the nursery and Christmas Eve in 1856. The author recalls Poland's historical splendour and its beginnings in Gniezno.

== See also ==
- Bydgoszcz
- Gniezno
- Jadwiga Łuszczewska
