= Helmut Donner =

Austrian high jumper (1941–2026)

Personal information
- Nationality: Austrian
- Born: 15 August 1941 Vienna, Nazi Germany
- Died: 30 October 2026 (aged 85)

Sport
- Sport: Athletics
- Event: High jump

Helmut Donner (15 August 1941 – 30 October 2026) was an Austrian athlete. He competed in the men's high jump at the 1960 Summer Olympics. Donner died on 30 October 2026, at the age of 85.
