= Martin Lachkovics =

Austrian athlete and bobsledder

Personal information
- Nationality: Austrian
- Born: January 25, 1975 (age 51) Vienna, Austria

Sport
- Country: Austria
- Sport: Athletics; Bobsleigh
- Events: Two-man (Bobsleigh)

Achievements and titles
- Olympic finals: 1996, 2000

Martin Lachkovics (born 25 January 1975) is an Austrian athlete and bobsledder. He represented Austria in athletics at two consecutive Olympic Games, in 1996 and 2000.

He has competed in bobsled since 2006. His best finish in the Bobsleigh World Cup was third twice in the two-man event (Calgary - November 2007, Cortina d'Ampezzo - January 2008).

Lachkovics' best finish at the FIBT World Championships was sixth in the two-man event at St. Moritz in 2007.
