= Werner Edler-Muhr =

Austrian middle-distance runner

Personal information
- Nationality: Austrian
- Born: 4 February 1969 (age 57) Graz, Austria

Sport
- Sport: Middle-distance running
- Event: 1500 metres

Werner Edler-Muhr (born 4 February 1969) is an Austrian middle-distance runner. He competed in the men's 1500 metres at the 1996 Summer Olympics.
