= Helmut Haid =

Austrian hurdler (1938–2019)

Personal information
- Nationality: Austrian
- Born: 18 November 1938 Innsbruck, Nazi-occupied Austria
- Died: 8 June 2019 (aged 80)

Sport
- Sport: Track and field
- Event: 400 metres hurdles

Helmut Haid (18 November 1938 – 8 June 2019) was an Austrian hurdler. He competed in the men's 400 metres hurdles at the 1964 Summer Olympics.
