= Sabine Skvara =

Sabine Skvara (born 15 April 1966) is a retired Austrian high jumper.

She finished seventh at the 1985 European Indoor Championships. She became Austrian champion in 1981 and 1985.
