= Guido Loacker =

Austrian sports shooter

Personal information
- Born: 13 February 1945 (age 81) Feldkirch, Vorarlberg, Nazi Germany

Sport
- Sport: Sports shooting

Guido Loacker (born 13 February 1945) is an Austrian former sports shooter. He competed at the 1968 Summer Olympics and the 1972 Summer Olympics.
