= Erika Strasser =

Austrian athlete (1934–2019)

Personal information
- Nationality: Austrian
- Born: 17 March 1934 Linz, Austria
- Died: 30 April 2019 (aged 85)

Sport
- Sport: Athletics
- Event: Javelin throw

Erika Strasser (17 March 1934 – 30 April 2019) was an Austrian athlete. She competed in the women's javelin throw at the 1960 Summer Olympics and the 1968 Summer Olympics. She was married to journalist Leo Strasser. She was a president of the Austrian Athletics Federation from 1985 to 1994.
