= Adolf Gruber =

Austrian long-distance runner

Dolfi Gruber
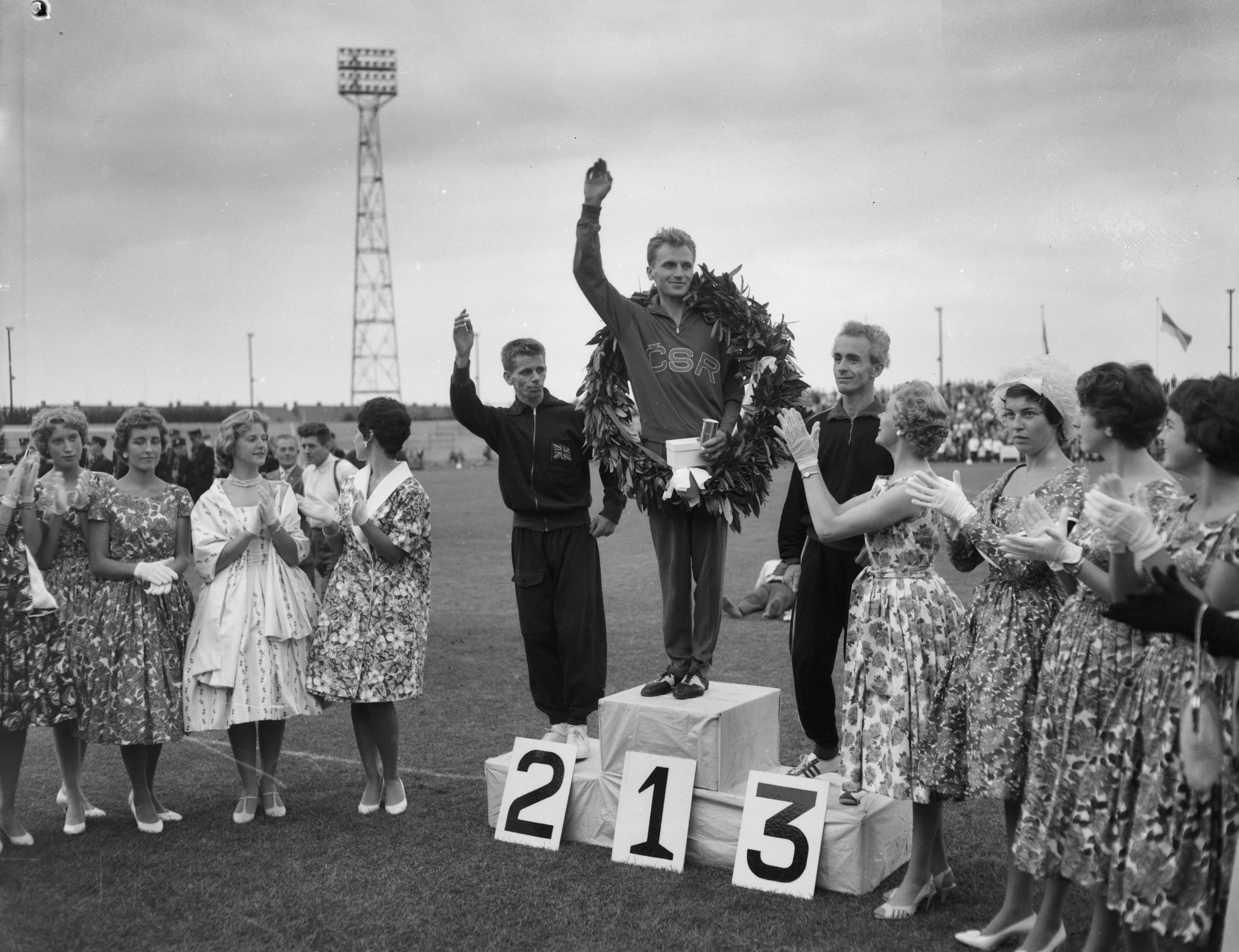
- Pawson (2), Kantorek (1) and Gruber (3), Enschede Marathon (1959)

Personal information
- Nationality: Austrian
- Born: 15 May 1920 Vienna, Austria
- Died: 7 January 1994 (aged 73) Vienna, Austria
- Height: 168 cm (5 ft 6 in)
- Weight: 59 kg (130 lb)

Sport
- Sport: Athletics
- Event: Long-distance running/Marathon
- Club: Wiener AC / ATSV Auersthal

Adolf Gruber (15 May 1920 – 7 January 1994) was an Austrian long-distance runner. He competed in the marathon at the 1952, 1956 and the 1960 Summer Olympics.

== Biography ==
Gruber won 33 Austrian titles over varying distances ranging from 3,000 metres to the marathon distance. In addition to athletics he competed in football, cycling, speed skating and table tennis. His personal best time in the marathon was 2:23:30.

After training in hotel management and then teaching, he was drafted into World War II where he was seriously wounded. He underwent 13 operations on his left upper arm following a wound inflicted by a amchine gun.

Gruber finished second behind Colin Kemball in the marathon event at the British 1958 AAA Championships from Windsor to Chiswick on 28 June.
