= Heinrich Thun =

Austrian hammer thrower (1938–2024)

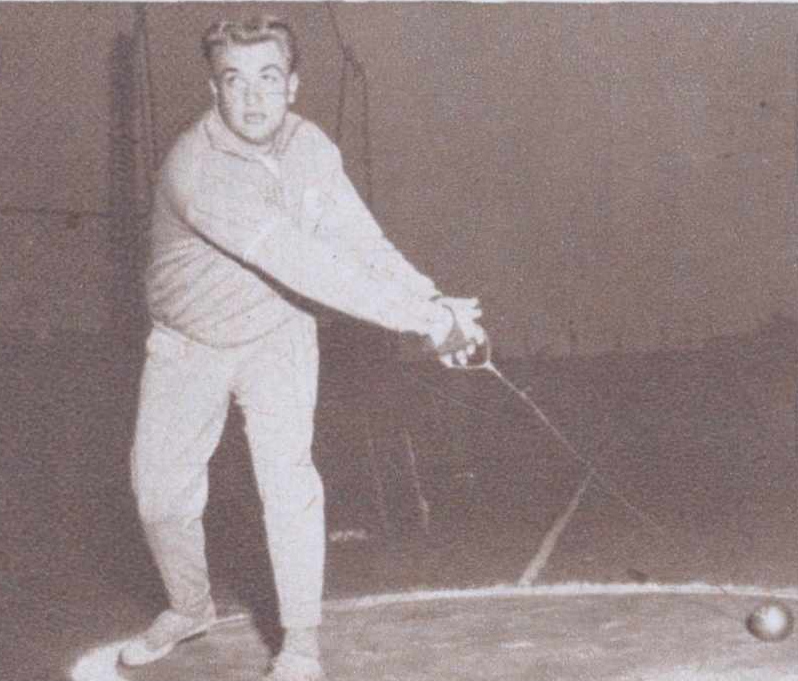
- Thun in 1963

Personal information
- Nationality: Austrian
- Born: 1 September 1938 Vienna, Nazi Germany
- Died: 14 August 2024 (aged 85) Vienna, Austria

Sport
- Sport: Athletics
- Event: Hammer throw

Heinrich Thun (1 September 1938 – 14 August 2024) was an Austrian athlete. He competed in the men's hammer throw at the 1960 Summer Olympics and the 1964 Summer Olympics. Thun died of a heart attack in Vienna on 14 August 2024, at the age of 85.
