= Gerhard Hartmann =

Austrian long-distance runner

Personal information
- Born: 12 January 1955 (age 71) Reutte
- Height: 180 cm (5 ft 11 in)
- Weight: 64 kg (141 lb)

Sport
- Country: Austria

Gerhard Hartmann (born 12 January 1955 in Reutte) is a retired long-distance runner from Austria, who won the Vienna Marathon three times in a row, starting in 1985. He represented his native country in the men's marathon at the 1984 Summer Olympics in Los Angeles, California. Hartmann set his personal best (2:12:22) on April 13, 1986, winning his second title in Vienna.

== Achievements ==
Year	Competition	Venue	Position	Event	Notes
Representing Austria
1983	World Championships	Helsinki, Finland	—	Marathon	DNF
1984	Olympic Games	Los Angeles, United States	—	Marathon	DNF
1985	Vienna Marathon	Vienna, Austria	1st	Marathon	2:14:59
1986	Vienna Marathon	Vienna, Austria	1st	Marathon	2:12:22
1987	Vienna Marathon	Vienna, Austria	1st	Marathon	2:16:10
1988	London Marathon	London, England	13th	Marathon	2:13:33
1988	Berlin Marathon	Berlin, Germany	12th	Marathon	2:15:38
