= Ernst Stöckl =

Austrian chess player

Personal information
- Born: 26 May 1912
- Died: 22 March 2000 (aged 87)

Chess career
- Country: Austria

Ernst Stöckl (26 May 1912 — 22 March 2000) was an Austrian chess player.

== Biography ==
From the second half of the 1950s until the mid-1960s, Ernst Stöckl was one of the strongest chess players in Austria. He was the participant of traditional chess tournaments held in Austria: Leopold Trebitsch Memorial Tournament, Carl Schlechter Memorial Tournament and others.

Ernst Stöckl played for Austria in the Chess Olympiads:

- In 1958, at third board in the 13th Chess Olympiad in Munich (+5, =4, -4),
- In 1964, at reserve board in the 16th Chess Olympiad in Tel Aviv (+2, =2, -3).

Ernst Stöckl played for Austria in the European Team Chess Championship preliminaries:

- In 1957, at seventh board in the 1st European Team Chess Championship preliminaries (+0, =1, -1),
- In 1965, at third board in the 3rd European Team Chess Championship preliminaries (+0, =2, -2).

Also Ernst Stöckl four time participated in Clare Benedict Chess Cup and in team competition won gold (1961) and bronze (1959) medals.
