= Siegfried Springer =

Austrian modern pentathlete

Personal information
- Born: 24 June 1943 (age 83) Eilard, Nazi Germany

Sport
- Sport: Modern pentathlon

Siegfried Springer (born 24 June 1943) is an Austrian modern pentathlete. He competed at the 1968 Summer Olympics.
