= Andreas Steiner (athlete) =

Austrian long jumper

Personal information
- Nationality: Austrian
- Born: 31 March 1964 (age 62) Innsbruck, Austria

Sport
- Sport: Athletics
- Event: Long jump

Andreas Steiner (born 31 March 1964) is an Austrian athlete. He competed in the men's long jump at the 1988 Summer Olympics.
