= Monika Gollner =

Austrian high jumper

Monika Gollner (born 23 October 1974 in Velden) is a retired Austrian high jumper.

She finished thirteenth at the 1992 World Junior Championships, and also competed at the 1995 World Indoor Championships, the 1995 World Championships, the 1998 European Championships and the 2012 European Championships without reaching the final.

Her personal best jump is 1.92 m (6 ft 3 1/2 in), achieved in July 1998 in Feldkirch.
