= Wolfgang Tschirk =

Austrian high jumper

Personal information
- Born: 5 October 1956 (age 69) Vienna, Austria

Sport
- Sport: Track and field

Wolfgang Tschirk (born 5 October 1956) is a retired Austrian high jumper.

He finished thirteenth at the 1981 European Indoor Championships. He also competed at the 1983 World Championships without reaching the final.

He became Austrian high jump champion eleven times in a row from 1974 through 1984 as well as in 1990 and 1991, his winning streak only broke by rivals Gottfried Wittgruber and Markus Einberger. He also became indoor champion in 1982, 1983, 1986, 1990 and 1991.
