= Teddy Steinmayr =

Austrian long jumper

Personal information
- Nationality: Austrian
- Born: 4 February 1964 (age 62)

Sport
- Sport: Athletics
- Event: Long jump

Teddy Steinmayr (born 4 February 1964) is an Austrian athlete. He competed in the men's long jump at the 1988 Summer Olympics.
