= Markus Einberger =

Austrian high jumper

Markus Einberger (born 5 February 1964) is a retired Austrian high jumper.

He competed at the 1983 World Championships without reaching the final. He became Austrian high jump champion in 1985, 1987, 1988 and 1989, rivalling with Gottfried Wittgruber and Wolfgang Tschirk. He also became indoor champion in 1984, 1985, 1988 and 1989.

His personal best jump was 2.28 metres, achieved in May 1986 in Schwechat. This is the current Austrian record.
