= Gottfried Wittgruber =

Austrian high jumper

Gottfried Wittgruber (born 16 April 1961) is a retired Austrian high jumper.

He finished eighth at the 1979 European Indoor Championships, and twelfth at the 1981 European Indoor Championships. He became the Austrian high jump champion in 1986, rivalling with Wolfgang Tschirk and Markus Einberger. He also became the indoor champion in 1981, 1987 and 1992.
