= Ernst Soudek =

Austrian discus thrower

Personal information
- Nationality: Austrian
- Born: 30 September 1940 (age 85) Vienna, Austria

Sport
- Sport: Athletics
- Event: Discus throw

Ernst Soudek (born 30 September 1940) is an Austrian athlete. He competed in the men's discus throw at the 1964 Summer Olympics.
