= Erwin Weitzl =

Austrian shot putter

Personal information
- Nationality: Austrian
- Born: 17 July 1960 (age 66)

Sport
- Sport: Athletics
- Event: Shot put

Erwin Weitzl (born 17 July 1960) is an Austrian athlete. He competed in the men's shot put at the 1984 Summer Olympics.
