= Ingo Peyker =

Austrian pole vaulter

Personal information
- Nationality: Austrian
- Born: 8 September 1941 (age 84)

Sport
- Sport: Athletics
- Event: Pole vault

Ingo Peyker (born 8 September 1941) is an Austrian athlete. He competed in the men's pole vault at the 1968 Summer Olympics.
