= Dietmar Millonig =

Austrian long-distance runner

Personal information
- Born: 1 June 1955 (age 71) Villach, Austria
- Height: 1.69 m (5 ft 7 in)
- Weight: 57 kg (126 lb)

Sport
- Sport: Athletics
- Events: 5000 m, 10,000 m
- Club: SV Schwechat; LC Villach

Dietmar Millonig (born 1 June 1955) is a retired Austrian long-distance runner. He won a gold medal at the 1986 European Indoor Championships. In addition, he represented his country at the 1980 Summer Olympics as well as one outdoor and one indoor World Championships.

He also won 40 Austrian titles in various events. His daughter Lena Millonig is the Austrian women national record holder of the 3000 meter steeplechase in 9:46.17 set in May 2024.

== International competitions ==
Year	Competition	Venue	Position	Event	Notes
Representing Austria
1973	European Junior Championships	Duisburg, West Germany	5th	5000 m	14:25.0
1978	European Indoor Championships	Milan, Italy	10th	3000 m	7:57.5
1978	European Championships	Prague, Czechoslovakia	21st (h)	1500 m	3:44.8
1978	European Championships	Prague, Czechoslovakia	24th (h)	5000 m	13:50.4
1979	European Indoor Championships	Vienna, Austria	6th	3000 m	7:47.5
1980	Olympic Games	Moscow, Soviet Union	6th	5000 m	13:23.3
1982	European Championships	Athens, Greece	5th	5000 m	13:31.03
1983	World Championships	Helsinki, Finland	8th	5000 m	13:36.08
1985	European Indoor Championships	Piraeus, Greece	5th	3000 m	8:11.21
1986	European Indoor Championships	Madrid, Spain	1st	3000 m	7:59.08
1987	World Indoor Championships	Indianapolis, United States	12th (h)	3000 m	7:58.74
1990	European Championships	Split, Yugoslavia	11th	10,000 m	28:16.95

== Personal bests ==
Outdoor

- 1500 metres – 3:38.38 (Schwechat 1982)
- One mile – 3:57.7 (Vienna 1979)
- 3000 metres – 7:43.66 (Lausanne 1980)
- 5000 metres – 13:15.31 (Zürich 1982)
- 10,000 metres – 27:42.98 (Oslo 1982)
- 10 kilometres – 28:43 (Auckland 1983)

Indoor

- 1500 metres – 3:39.81 (Budapest 1985)
- 3000 metres – 7:47.5 (Vienna 1979)
- 5000 metres – 13:33.79 (East Rutherford 1986)
