= Dorli Hofrichter =

Austrian discus thrower

Personal information
- Nationality: Austrian
- Born: 8 March 1935 (age 91)

Sport
- Sport: Athletics
- Event: Discus throw

Dorli Hofrichter (born 8 March 1935) is an Austrian athlete. She competed in the women's discus throw at the 1960 Summer Olympics.
