= Axel Nepraunik =

Austrian athlete

Personal information
- Nationality: Austrian
- Born: 3 February 1945 (age 81) Hamburg, Germany

Sport
- Sport: Sprinting
- Event: 100 metres

Axel Nepraunik (born 3 February 1945) is an Austrian sprinter. He competed in the men's 100 metres at the 1972 Summer Olympics.
