= Peter Sternad =

Austrian athlete (1946–2022)

Personal information
- Nationality: Austrian
- Born: 8 February 1946 Villach, Austria
- Died: 22 November 2022 (aged 76) Villach, Austria

Sport
- Sport: Athletics
- Event: Hammer throw

Peter Sternad (8 February 1946 – 22 November 2022) was an Austrian athlete. He competed in the men's hammer throw at the 1972 Summer Olympics and the 1976 Summer Olympics.
