= Armin Vilas =

Austrian bobsledder

Medal record

Bobsleigh

World Championships
Bronze medal – third place	1975 Cervinia	Four-man

Armin Vilas is an Austrian bobsledder who competed in the mid-1970s. He won the bronze medal in the four-man event at the 1975 FIBT World Championships in Cervinia.
