= Wolf-Dietrich Sonnleitner =

Austrian modern pentathlete

Personal information
- Born: 23 October 1943 (age 82) Linz, Nazi Germany

Sport
- Sport: Modern pentathlon

Wolf-Dietrich Sonnleitner (born 23 October 1943) is an Austrian modern pentathlete. He competed at the 1968 Summer Olympics.
