= Susanne Pumper =

Austrian long-distance runner

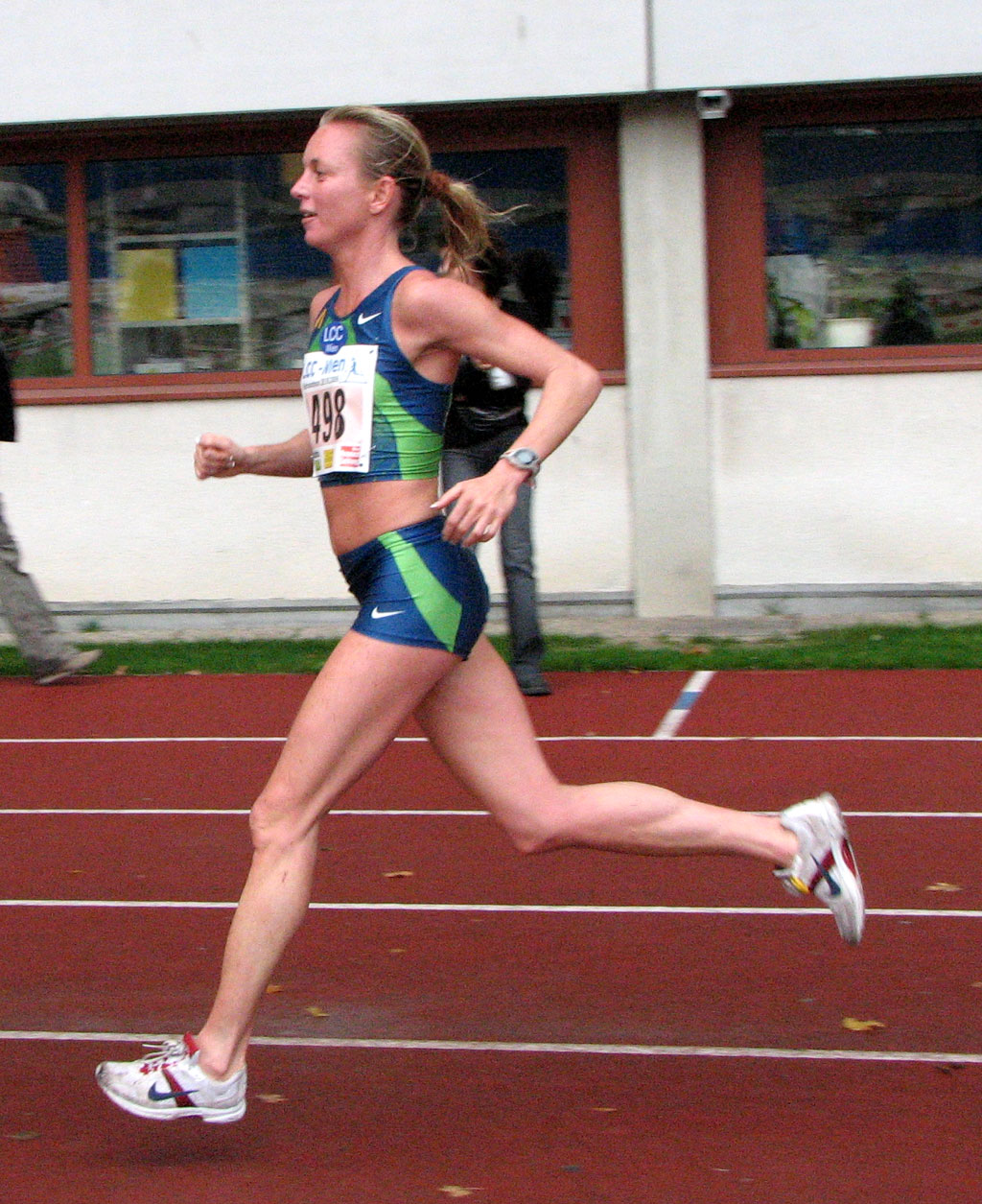
Pumper running in Vienna in 2006

Susanne Pumper (born 1 September 1970 in Vienna) is an Austrian retired long-distance runner who holds the national records in the 3000, 5000 and 10,000 metres track events as well as in the 10 km road racing distance. She has competed at the World Championships in Athletics on three occasions (1999, 2001, 2003) and represented Austria at the 2000 Sydney Olympics. Her best international performance was a silver medal over 3000 m at the 2005 European Athletics Indoor Championships. She also had a fourth-place finish in that event at the 2002 edition, which was held in her home city.

She tested positive at an international competition for the banned substance rh-EPO in 2008, and was banned from competition for two years for the infraction. She was later proved to have obtained EPO during 2008, at the time her ban was ongoing, which resulted in disqualification of all her times in 2010 and 2011 (including two national marathon titles) and an eight-year ban from competition.

== Biography ==
She took six consecutive wins in the elite 5 km race at the Österreichischer Frauenlauf (Austrian Women's Run) from its debut edition in 1999 up to 2004. Pumper is a two-time winner of the half marathon at the Wiener Herbstmarathon (Vienna Autumn Marathon) and set the women's course record of 1:12:33 hours in 2007. Another course record she holds is in the half marathon section of the Vienna City Marathon, having run 1:13:20 hours to win in 2005. She stepped up to the marathon distance at the competition the following year and delivered an Austrian record time of 2:32:21 hours.

She tested positive at an international competition for the banned substance rh-EPO in 2008. She was banned from competition for two years for the infraction. She was later proved to have obtained EPO during 2008, at the time her ban was ongoing. This resulted in disqualification of all her times in 2010 and 2011 (including two national marathon titles) and an eight-year ban from competition.

== Achievements ==
Year	Competition	Venue	Position	Notes
1999	World Championships	Seville	12th	5000 m
2002	European Indoor Championships	Vienna	4th	3000 m
2003	World Indoor Championships	Birmingham	11th	3000 m
2005	European Indoor Championships	Madrid	2nd	3000 m

=== Personal bests ===
- 1500 metres - 4:19.17 min (2003)
- 3000 metres - 8:47.04 min (2000)
- 5000 metres - 15:10.54 min (2001)
- 10,000 metres - 32:12.33 min (2005)
- Half marathon - 1:12:21 hrs (2008)
- Marathon - 2:32:21 hrs (2006)

== See also ==
- List of doping cases in athletics
