= Peter Schmid (swimmer) =

Austrian swimmer

Personal information
- Born: 27 April 1949 (age 77) Klagenfurt, Austria

Sport
- Sport: Swimming

Peter Schmid (born 27 April 1949) is an Austrian former freestyle and medley swimmer. He competed in two events at the 1968 Summer Olympics.
