= Elmar Kunauer =

Austrian sprinter

Personal information
- Nationality: Austrian
- Born: 18 April 1940 Sankt Paul im Lavanttal, Reichsgau Kärnten, Nazi Germany
- Died: 17 December 2022 (aged 82)

Sport
- Sport: Sprinting
- Event: 100 metres

Elmar Kunauer (18 April 1940 – 17 December 2022) was an Austrian sprinter. He competed in the men's 100 metres at the 1960 Summer Olympics.
