= Ursula Weber =

Austrian discus thrower

Personal information
- Nationality: Austrian
- Born: 26 September 1960 (age 65)

Sport
- Sport: Athletics
- Event: Discus throw

Ursula Weber (born 26 September 1960) is an Austrian athlete. She competed in the women's discus throw at the 1992 Summer Olympics.
