= Csaba Szekely =

Romanian ice hockey coach and player

Csaba Szekely (born May 2, 1990, in Romania) is a professional Hungarian ice hockey coach and goaltender. He is the current goaltending coach at Dunaújvárosi Acélbikák. and the head coach for U10 at Vasas SC, where he is working with the formal NHL player Levente Szuper. Szekely played as a goaltending and was part of the MAC Budapest and Vasas SC during his playing career.

He started his career in Gheorgheni, Romania, then moved to Budapest and started to play for MAC Budapest in 2006. In the 2011–2012, season he led his team Budapest Stars U23 to first place at the Hungarian National Championship and got the Best Goaltending award.

== Playing career ==
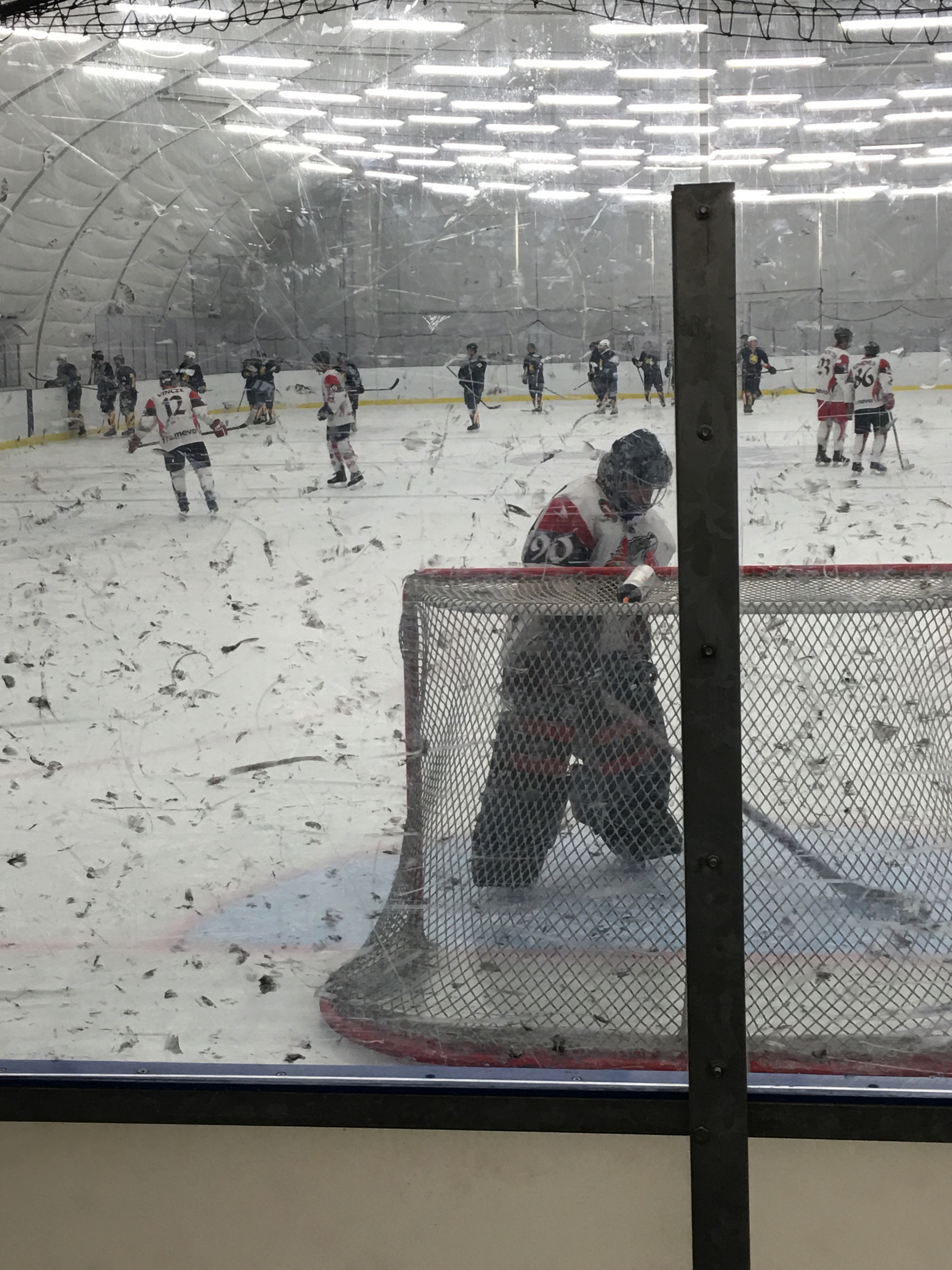

At his first professional season in 2007/2008 he played for MAC Budapest U18. They played at Division I Group A, at the U18 National Championship.

After his career with MAC Budapest, in 2011 he changed his jersey and his team to Budapest Stars (today known as Vasas SC.) The same year, at his very first season his team won the U23 Hungarian National Championship.

In 2012/2013 Szekely was the goaltender for UTE in the MOL Liga, where the team finished at the 7th place that season.

In 2016 the head coach Attila Hoffmann of the Hungarian National Inline Team made his roster for the season. Szekely was rosted as a goaltender and travelled to Prerov, Czech Republic as the part of the Inline World Championship. It was his first game as the part of the Hungarian National Inline Team. The team also participated and won the five team Czech International Tournament.

== Coaching career ==
From 2011 he started to work at Vasas SC, with Levente Szuper who was the first Hungarian native to appear on an active NHL roster for a game.

2012 was the first year when he worked at the Levente Szuper Goalie Camp among Dávid Duschek, and the NHL sportscaster: István Spiller.The 2014/2015 season was very busy for Csaba Szekely. He was working as a head coach (Vasas SC) for U-8, while working with U-14 (Vasas SC) as an assistant coach. He also covered the goaltending position from U-10 to U20 (Vasas SC). The U8 team won the II. Steel Bull International Tournament (organized by Hungary Talent) in Dunaújváros. Through his career he had many interview with one of the biggest ice hockey pages in Hungary, namely Jegkorongblog, among others about his ambitions, and the importance of educating the children. During the season, he was invited by Attila Nagy, and Glen Williams as a guest coach to the Hungarian National Development Program, age U13, U14, and U15.

"I worked for two to three years as a guest coach for the succession of the supplying team, I watched and learned. In August 2015, Attila Nagy team manager called for the U13 team to join in with Glen Williamson. I was very happy to count on me, it is a great honor to work with the Hungarian national team. And this season tops off the last one, with the fact that this year I also lead the work of the team U14."

In the next season 2015/2016, he stayed as a head coach for U8 (Vasas SC) and got extra responsibilities with being the head coah of the age U10 (Vasas SC). Szekely took the U8 team to the III. Steel Bull International Tournament in Dunaújváros, (organized by Hungary Talent), where they got the 1st place. They also participated at the Nitra (SVK) International Tournament, and after hard work they ended up at the 2nd place. Also this season they finished the Ruzinov (SVK) International Tournament at the 3rd place.

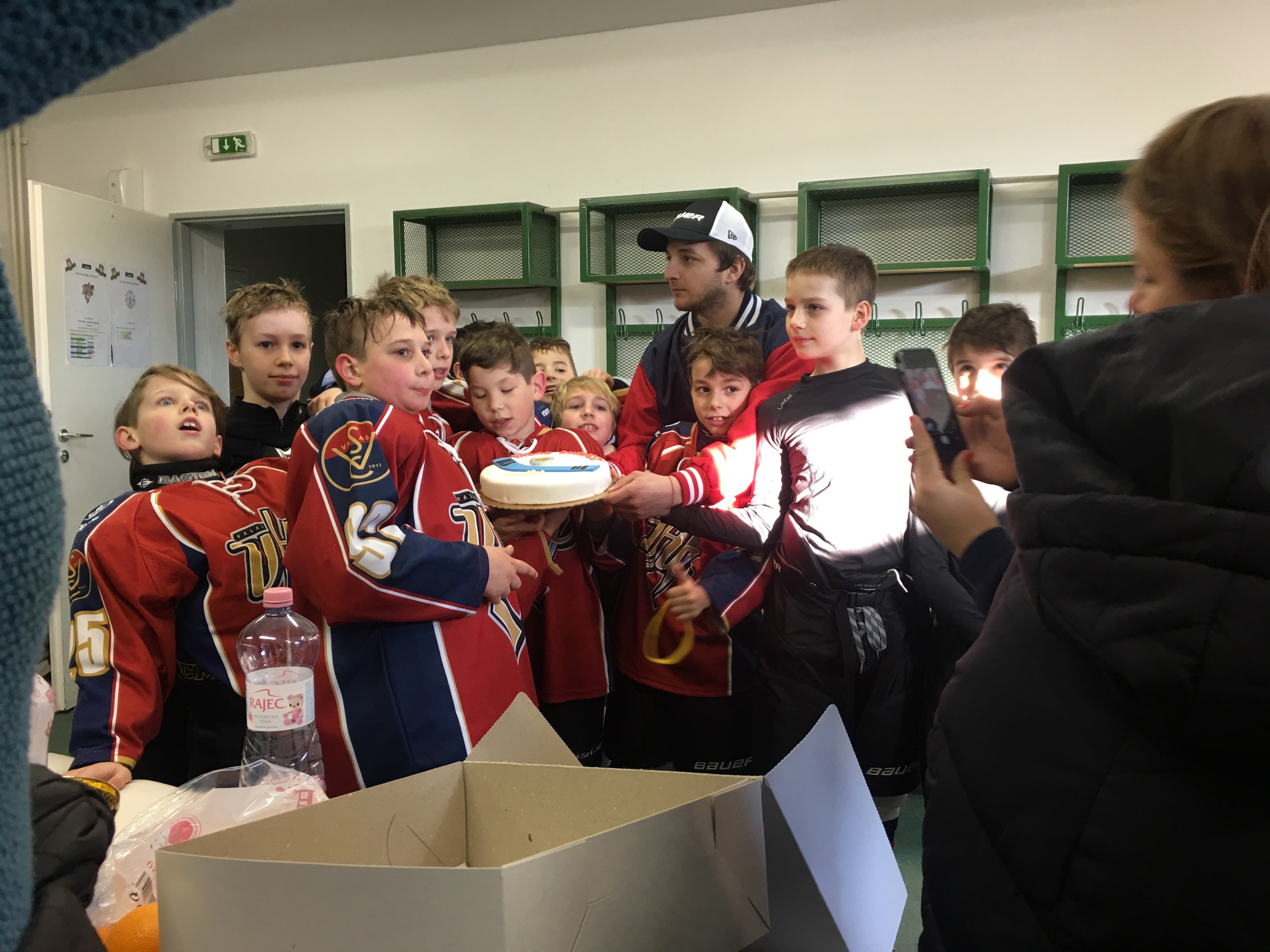

Not only the U8 team did good, but also the U10. They were also participated at the Nitra (SVK) International Tournament and got to the 1st place, and the end of 2015 they travelled all the way to Dunaújváros for the Santa Claus International Tournament, (organized by Hungary Talent) where they finished at the 4th place, and received the best Hungarian team award. As a goaltending coach Szekely Csaba travelled to Latvia with the Hungarian U15 National Team. The boys put up a good fight, and got the 4th place at the Riga Cup. The whole 2015/2016 season Szekely worked with more than 120 children, only at Vasas SC.

In 2017 he continued his work at the Hungarian National Team Development Program as a head goaltending coach for team U14. The same year he signed another season with Vasas SC where he became the head coach of U10, and goaltending coach for all ages. He also became the goaltending coach for the Dunaújvárosi Acélbikák in the Erste Liga for the season 2017/2018.

In the new 2018/2019 season Svasznek Bence choose Csaba Szekely to lead and coach the Hungarian National Team U18 goalies.

Through his career he had many interview with one of the biggest ice hockey pages in Hungary, namely Jegkorongblog, among others about his ambitions, and the importance of educating the children.

== Education ==
From 2014 until today Szekely is an active member of many coaching event organized by the Hungarian Ice Hockey Federation. His mentor coach was Darryl Easson

In 2016, he participated at the Sports Connect World Class Skills Camp, where he worked with Petr Jonak and Anatoly Buliga.
