= Walter Pektor =

Austrian javelin thrower

Personal information
- Nationality: Austrian
- Born: 20 September 1945 Salzburg, Austria
- Died: 23 December 1994 (aged 49) Gmunden, Austria
- Height: 185 cm (6 ft 1 in)
- Weight: 86 kg (190 lb)

Sport
- Country: Austria
- Sport: Javelin throw

Walter Pektor (20 September 1945 – 23 December 1994) was an Austrian Olympic javelin thrower. He represented his country in the men's javelin throw at the 1968 Summer Olympics. His distance was an 82.16 in the qualifiers and a 77.40 in the finals. He was the former Austrian record holder and nine-time Austrian champion.
