= Wilfried Siegele =

Austrian racewalker

Personal information
- Nationality: Austrian
- Born: 26 June 1958 (age 68)

Sport
- Sport: Athletics
- Event: Racewalking

Wilfried Siegele (born 26 June 1958) is an Austrian racewalker. He competed in the men's 20 kilometres walk at the 1980 Summer Olympics.
