= Eva Janko =

Austrian javelin thrower

Personal information
- Nationality: Austrian
- Born: January 24, 1945 (age 81) Floing, Styria, Nazi Germany

Sport
- Sport: Athletics
- Event: javelin
- Club: LAC Südstadt; ULC Wildschek
Medal record
Women's athletics
Representing Austria
Olympic Games
Bronze medal – third place	1968 Mexico City	Javelin throw

Eva Janko (née Egger; born 24 January 1945) is a former javelin thrower from Austria.

== Biography ==
Janko won the bronze medal in javelin throw at the 1968 Summer Olympics held in Mexico City, Mexico.

Her personal best throw of 61,80 metres, achieved in July 1973 in Innsbruck, is still the Austrian record.

Janko won the British WAAA Championships title in the javelin throw event at the 1974 WAAA Championships.

== Personal life ==
She is the mother of the Austria national football team player Marc Janko.
