= Gert Herunter =

Austrian decathlete

Personal information
- Nationality: Austrian
- Born: 9 March 1942 (age 84) Witzenhausen, Nazi Germany

Sport
- Sport: Athletics
- Event: Decathlon

Gert Herunter (born 9 March 1942) is an Austrian athlete. He competed in the men's decathlon at the 1968 Summer Olympics.
