= Volker Tulzer =

Austrian middle-distance runner (1940–2005)

Personal information
- Nationality: Austrian
- Born: 24 June 1940
- Died: 13 October 2005 (aged 65) Vienna, Austria

Sport
- Sport: Middle-distance running
- Event: 1500 metres

Volker Tulzer (24 June 1940 – 13 October 2005) was an Austrian middle-distance runner. He competed in the men's 1500 metres at the 1964 Summer Olympics.
