= Wolfgang Konrad =

Austrian middle-distance runner

Personal information
- Nationality: Austrian
- Born: 22 December 1958 (age 67)

Sport
- Sport: Middle-distance running
- Event: Steeplechase

Wolfgang Konrad (born 22 December 1958) is an Austrian middle-distance runner. He competed in the men's 3000 metres steeplechase at the 1980 Summer Olympics. He has served as the organiser of the Vienna City Marathon since 1989. He is the father of racing cyclist Patrick Konrad.
