= Johann Siegele =

Austrian racewalker

Personal information
- Nationality: Austrian
- Born: 23 November 1948 (age 77)

Sport
- Sport: Athletics
- Event: Racewalking

Johann Siegele (born 23 November 1948) is an Austrian racewalker. He competed in the men's 20 kilometres walk at the 1980 Summer Olympics.
