= Horst Mandl =

Horst Mandl (January 8, 1936 – July 13, 2018) was an Austrian athlete. He was born in Graz, Steiermark, Austria. He represented Austria in the decathlon at the 1968 Olympics. While he was not able to complete the first day at the Olympics, he was the Austrian National Champion in 110 metres hurdles (1967–1969), high jump (1970 and 1973), long jump (1962, 1964–1966), triple jump nine times in row (1964–1972), pentathlon (1967–1968) and decathlon (1963-1965 and 1969–1971).

He also took up coaching. Among his first success stories was his future wife Doris, whom he coached to the state championship in the 100 metres hurdles. He coached at the General Gymnastics Club Graz until his retirement.

Mandl continued competing into masters age groups, winning the world championships in the M40 110m hurdles, high jump and triple jump in 1977, and M50 high jump and triple jump in 1987. In 1976 he set the masters M40 world record in the high jump at 2.02m, which lasted for five years, until it was surpassed by John Dobroth. In 1996. Mandl again set a masters M60 world record at 1.70, improving on the record of Milton Newton, which would hold for two years until it was surpassed by Phil Fehlen. Since 2001, he has been tied with Jim Gilcrest for the current M65 indoor record at 1.62.
