= Christiane Wildschek =

Austrian sprinter

Personal information
- Nationality: Austrian
- Born: Christiane Casapicola; 5 July 1954 (age 72)

Sport
- Sport: Sprinting
- Event: 400 metres

Christiane Wildschek (née Casapicola; born 5 July 1954) is an Austrian sprinter. She competed in the women's 400 metres at the 1976 Summer Olympics.
