= Heimo Reinitzer =

Austrian discus thrower (1943–2026

Personal information
- Nationality: Austrian
- Born: 24 September 1943 Graz, Reichsgau Steiermark, Nazi Germany
- Died: 5 June 2026 (aged 82) Hamburg, Germany

Sport
- Sport: Athletics
- Event: Discus throw

Heimo Reinitzer (24 September 1943 – 5 June 2026) was an Austrian athlete. He competed in the men's discus throw at the 1968 Summer Olympics and the 1972 Summer Olympics. Reinitzer died in Hamburg, Germany on 5 June 2026, at the age of 82.
