= Rudolf Klaban =

Austrian middle-distance runner

Personal information
- Nationality: Austrian
- Born: 5 April 1938 (age 88) Vienna, Austria

Sport
- Sport: Middle-distance running
- Event: 800 metres
Medal record
Representing Austria
Summer Universiade
| Silver medal – second place | 1961 Sofia | 800m |
| Bronze medal – third place | 1961 Sofia | 1500m |
| Bronze medal – third place | 1965 Budapest | 800m |

Rudolf Klaban (born 5 April 1938) is an Austrian middle-distance runner. He competed in the 800 metres at the 1960 Summer Olympics and the 1964 Summer Olympics.
