= Inge Aigner =

Austrian sprinter

Personal information
- Nationality: Austrian
- Born: 30 January 1943 (age 82) Sankt Pölten, Nazi Germany

Sport
- Sport: Sprinting
- Event: 100 metres

Ingeborg Aigner-Weichert (born 30 January 1943) is an Austrian sprinter. She competed in the women's 100 metres at the 1964 Summer Olympics.
