= Collider (film) =

2013 Portuguese-Irish SF / drama film

- Directed by: Jason Butler
- Written by: Nuno Bernardo
- Produced by: Nuno Bernardo; Triona Campbell; John McDonnell
- Starring: Iain Robertson; Bella Heesom; Marco Costa; Lucy Cudden; Jamie Maclachlan; Teresa Tavares
- Production company: beActive Entertainment
- Distributed by: beActive Entertainment
- Release dates: 14 November 2013 (Portugal); 10 January 2014 (Dublin)
- Running time: 79 minutes
- Countries: Ireland, Portugal
- Language: English

Collider (sometimes referred as Collider World) is a 2013 Irish-Portuguese co-produced drama/science fiction film distributed by beActive Entertainment. The film acts as the core for a transmedia project developed for various platforms.

The film focuses on the possible danger induced by research lead at the CERN. It premiered in London on October 16, 2013, and received am Emmy nomination for the Best Digital Production in 2014.

== Plot ==
The Large Hadron Collider research at CERN was on the verge of a breakthrough in regards to black holes. Scientists believed that they would be able to control the micro black holes once created but Peter Ansay, a young genius in quantum physics thought differently. His report brought up astounding conclusions that the current research on the radiation phenomenon was inaccurate and that if they were actually able to create these black holes, the level of radiation would be so significantly lower than anticipated that they would literally implode in on themselves, taking all surrounding matter with them.

Depending on the exact level of radiation it could be catastrophic. Peter's report was rejected by CERN and his credibility as a scientist was destroyed. On 23 September 2012, Peter breaks into the CERN laboratories to gain access to the Collider and sabotage it preventing any future experiments. But something goes wrong in a way that Peter couldn't have predicted, and he is transported to 2018 by a wormhole to a world destroyed by natural disasters and at war with the Unknown. He wakes up in a strangely familiar place, convinced he's somehow been there before. He is now in the future, 2018, and "trapped" inside what seems to be a hotel.

Outside, the atmosphere is unlivable and anyone who ventures out disappears in the shadows, taken by the Unknown. What Peter soon realises is that he is not alone. Five total strangers from different times and places are also in the hotel with him, but unlike him they know nothing about the future or how they got there. Peter keeps getting flashes of memory and a sense of déjà vu linked to the future. If he's right then he has just 36 hours to figure out a way to get to CERN, reverse the wormhole and prevent the apocalypse because when the clock runs out so does Earth's existence.

== Cast ==
- Iain Robertson as Peter Ansay
- Bella Heesom as Alisha Tate
- Marco Costa as Carlos Vera
- Lucy Cudden as Fiona Murphy
- Jamie Maclachlan as Luke Spencer
- Teresa Tavares as Lucia de Souza

== Tie-in material and media ==
Prior to the film's development, Collider started as an interactive multi-platform project distributed by beActive Entertainment that combines comic book series alongside a graphic novel, two mobile video games for Android devices webisodes and online presence.

=== Comics ===
A 6-issue comic book series alongside a graphic novel were written by Mike Garley and illustrated by R H Stewart, Gareth Gowran, Jack Tempest, Will Pickering and Martin Simmonds. The comics are available as on iTunes and Google Play.

In addition to the comics, a graphic novel is available on Amazon, the Apple iBookstore, and on paperback edition in major comic stores around Europe.

=== Games ===
Two mobile games have been available for iOS and Android platforms.

Collider Quest is the first game in the franchise. This game is about collecting items, solving puzzles and testing memory through multiple levels with increasing difficulty.

The game was released in the Summer of 2012, and is available in the iOS App Store and Google Play. had also been available on Facebook.

Collider Code Breaker is the second game in the franchise and is available exclusively on iOS devices. The game follows Luke Spencer on disarming every bomb by cracking their code.

=== Digital series ===
An 8-episode digital series that acts as prequel to the film was developed in January 2012 for YouTube and SAPO, gaining more than 1 million viewers. The series was subsequently broadcast on Portuguese television channel SIC Radical.

The series was shot in Lisbon and was written by Catriona Scott and Nuno Bernardo, with Bernardo being the director and Iain Robertson reprising his role as Peter Ansay from the film.

No.	Title	Directed by	Written by	Original release date
1	"Life or Death"	Nuno Bernardo	Catriona Scott and Nuno Bernardo	4 June 2012
2	"End of the World"	Nuno Bernardo	Catriona Scott and Nuno Bernardo	11 June 2012
3	"Breakdown"	Nuno Bernardo	Catriona Scott and Nuno Bernardo	18 June 2012
4	"Know the Truth"	Nuno Bernardo	Catriona Scott and Nuno Bernardo	25 June 2012
5	"Long Hours"	Nuno Bernardo	Catriona Scott and Nuno Bernardo	2 July 2012
6	"Paranoia"	Nuno Bernardo	Catriona Scott and Nuno Bernardo	9 July 2012
7	"Despair"	Nuno Bernardo	Catriona Scott and Nuno Bernardo	16 July 2012
8	"The Point of No Return"	Nuno Bernardo	Catriona Scott and Nuno Bernardo	23 July 2012

== Reception ==
Rory Cashin of Entertainment.ie gave the film a 1 out 5.
