= List of members of the Order of the Companions of Honour =

Below is a list of members of the Order of the Companions of Honour from the order's creation in 1917 until the present day.

== Members ==
Blue denotes honorary members.
Yellow denotes living (ordinary) members.
Pink denotes royal companions.

Date	Portrait or photo	Name	Birth–Death	Area of achievement
4 June 1917		Jan Smuts	1870–1950	Statesman
4 June 1917		Harry Gosling	1861–1930	Politician and trade unionist
4 June 1917		The Marchioness of Lansdowne	1850–1932	Courtier and humanitarian
4 June 1917		Elizabeth Haldane	1862–1937	Suffragist, writer
4 June 1917		K. B. Quinan	1878–1948	Chemical engineer
4 June 1917		Sir Henry Smith	1863–1923	Civil servant
4 June 1917		The Lord Burnham	1862–1933	Newspaper proprietor and politician
4 June 1917		Sir Frank Swettenham	1850–1946	Colonial administrator
4 June 1917		Edward Strutt	1854–1930	Agriculturalist
4 June 1917		The Lord Faringdon	1850–1934	Financier and politician
4 June 1917		The Viscount Chetwynd	1863–1936	Industrialist
4 June 1917		William Ripper	1853–1937	Educationalist
4 June 1917		May Tennant	1869–1946	Civil servant and social reformer
4 June 1917		Violet Markham	1872–1959	Social reformer
4 June 1917		William John Davis	1848–1934	Trade unionist
4 June 1917		George Wardle	1865–1947	Politician
4 June 1917		Alexander Wilkie	1850–1928	Politician
1 January 1918		Sir John Furley	1836–1919	Humanitarian
1 January 1918		James Andrew Seddon	1868–1939	Politician and trade unionist
1 January 1918		James Parker	1863–1948	Politician
25 February 1918		Sir Alfred Keogh	1857–1936	Doctor, head of Army Medical Service
3 June 1918		Sir Herbert Perrott, Bt	1849–1922	Humanitarian
~~3 June 1918~~		~~Sir Frederick Treves, Bt~~	~~1853-1923~~	~~Surgeon~~
3 June 1918		Sir Samuel Provis	1845–1926	Civil servant
29 April 1919		Walter Layton	1884–1966	Economist and newspaper proprietor
29 April 1919		Sir Thomas Royden, Bt	1871–1950	Businessman and politician
1 January 1920		George Nicoll Barnes	1859–1940	Politician
1 January 1920		Philip Kerr	1882–1940	Diplomat
1 January 1921		Sir John Ellerman, Bt	1862–1933	Entrepreneur and shipping magnate
1 January 1921		John Clifford	1836–1923	Nonconformist minister
4 June 1921		The Viscount Dillon	1844–1932	Antiquary and heraldist
4 June 1921		Arthur Headlam	1862–1947	Bishop of Gloucester
4 June 1921		Sir William Robertson Nicoll	1851–1923	Church minister and journalist
2 January 1922		Sir Henry Jones	1852–1922	Philosopher
2 January 1922		Sir Henry Newbolt	1862–1938	Poet
2 January 1922		Joseph Havelock Wilson	1859–1929	Trade unionist
19 October 1922		Sir Hall Caine	1853–1931	Novelist
19 October 1922		Winston Churchill	1874–1965	Statesman
19 October 1922		Sir Vincent Evans	1851–1934	Journalist and promoter of the Welsh national revival
19 October 1922		John Henry Jowett	1863–1923	Congregationalist minister
25 May 1923		J. C. C. Davidson	1889–1970	Conservative politician
1 January 1926		Wilson Carlile	1847–1942	Church Army founder
5 June 1926		Herbert Armitage James	1844–1931	Cleric and school administrator
1 January 1927		Hugh Sheppard	1880–1937	Anglican priest
9 May 1927		Stanley Bruce	1883–1967	Prime Minister of Australia
3 June 1927		John Jones	1865–1942	Congregational minister
4 June 1928		John Scott Haldane	1860–1936	Physiologist
1 March 1929		Florence, Lady Barrett	1867–1945	Gynaecologist
1 March 1929		John Carlile	1862–1941	Baptist minister, social reformer
1 March 1929		Lilian Baylis	1874–1937	Theatre producer
1 March 1929		Frederick Delius	1862–1934	Composer
30 April 1929		Bramwell Booth	1856–1929	Leader of The Salvation Army
3 June 1929		Thomas Jones	1870–1955	Civil servant and educationalist
1 January 1930		Maude Royden	1876–1956	Suffragist
1 January 1930		V. S. Srinivasa Sastri	1869–1946	Indian politician
1 January 1930		Gertrude Tuckwell	1861–1951	Trade unionist and social worker
3 June 1930		Margaret McMillan	1860–1931	Trade unionist
1 January 1931		Helena Swanwick	1864–1939	Feminist and pacifist
1 January 1931		Jane Harriett Walker	1859–1938	Medical doctor
3 June 1931		Albert Mansbridge	1876–1952	Educator
3 June 1931		Seebohm Rowntree	1871–1954	Industrialist and philanthropist
1 January 1932		John Buchan	1875–1940	Scottish author and Governor General of Canada
3 June 1932		E. V. Lucas	1868–1938	Writer
3 June 1932		Laurence Binyon	1869–1943	Poet
2 January 1933		Tubby Clayton	1885–1972	Priest and philanthropist
2 January 1933		John Scott Lidgett	1854–1953	Methodist priest and educationist
3 June 1933		Annie Horniman	1860–1937	Theatre manager
1 January 1934		Thomas Page	1850–1936	Classicist
3 June 1935		William Bruce	1858–1936	Lawyer, politician, educationalist
3 June 1935		John White	1867–1951	Moderator of the General Assembly of the Church of Scotland
1 January 1936		J. Dover Wilson	1881–1969	Shakespeare scholar
23 June 1936		Joseph Lyons	1879–1939	Prime Minister of Australia
23 June 1936		Janet Trevelyan	1879–1956	Writer
23 June 1936		Hugh MacDowell Pollock	1852–1937	Businessman and Ulster Unionist politician
23 June 1936		George Adams	1874–1966	Political scientist and academic
11 May 1937		Melbourn Aubrey	1885–1957	Baptist Union of Great Britain General Secretary
11 May 1937		John Alfred Spender	1862–1942	Journalist and editor
11 May 1937		Charles Thomson Rees Wilson	1869–1959	Physicist
11 May 1937		The Viscountess Astor	1879–1964	Pioneering woman politician
11 May 1937		Gwendoline Davies	1882–1951	Philanthropist and patron of the arts
1 January 1938		Howell Arthur Gwynne	1865–1950	Newspaper editor and author
8 June 1939		James Mallon	1875–1961	Social reformer
8 June 1939		George Peabody Gooch	1873–1968	Historian
1 January 1941		James Louis Garvin	1868–1947	Journalist and author
1 January 1941		Arthur Henry Mann	1876–1972	Journalist
1 January 1941		Billy Hughes	1862–1952	Prime Minister of Australia
12 June 1941		A. V. Alexander	1885–1965	Labour politician
11 June 1942		The Lord Woolton	1883–1964	Businessman turned-politician
23 June 1942		Sir Earle Page	1880–1961	Prime Minister of Australia
1 January 1943		Joseph Hertz	1872–1946	Chief Rabbi of Great Britain and the Commonwealth
1 January 1943		The Lord Leathers	1883–1965	Industrialist turned-politician
21 May 1943		J. M. Andrews	1871–1956	Prime Minister of Northern Ireland
2 June 1943		Ernest Hives	1886–1965	Industrialist
2 June 1943		The Lord Snell	1865–1944	Labour politician
9 August 1943		The Viscount Swinton	1884–1972	Conservative politician
24 September 1943		Essington Lewis	1881–1961	Industrialist
1 January 1944		Richard Casey	1890–1976	Australian politician and British colonial administrator
1 January 1944		Edmund Fellowes	1870–1951	Theologian and musicologist
1 January 1944		Robert Hudson	1886–1957	Conservative politician
8 June 1944		Sir Henry Wood	1869–1944	Conductor, founded the Proms
4 August 1944		Sir Godfrey Huggins	1883–1971	Prime Minister of Rhodesia
1 January 1945		The Earl of Selborne	1887–1971	Conservative politician
8 June 1945		Clement Attlee	1883–1967	Labour politician
8 June 1945		Arthur Greenwood	1880–1954	Labour politician
14 June 1945		Henry Williams	1872–1961	Bishop of Carlisle
5 July 1945		Harry Crerar	1888–1965	Canadian general
17 August 1945		Leo Amery	1873–1955	Conservative politician
17 August 1945		Ernest Brown	1881–1962	Liberal politician
17 August 1945		Hastings Ismay	1887–1965	Soldier
1 January 1946		Archibald Hill	1886–1977	Physiologist
4 January 1946		Peter Fraser	1884–1950	Prime Minister of New Zealand
22 May 1946		Vincent Massey	1887–1967	Governor General of Canada
13 June 1946		George Gibson	1885–1953	Trade unionist
13 June 1946		Andrew McNaughton	1887–1966	Canadian general and diplomat
12 June 1947		James Bone	1872–1962	Journalist
12 June 1947		J. W. Robertson Scott	1866–1962	Writer, campaigner on rural issues
1 January 1948		Margaret Bondfield	1873–1953	Pioneering woman politician
1 January 1948		Vita Sackville-West	1892–1962	Writer
10 June 1948		Walter de la Mare	1873–1956	Writer
10 June 1948		Howell Elvet Lewis	1860–1953	Bard, Archdruid of the National Eisteddfod of Wales
10 June 1948		William Whiteley	1882–1955	Labour politician
1 January 1949		Lord David Cecil	1902–1986	Biographer, historian and academic
1 January 1949		Arthur Deakin	1890–1955	Trade unionist
9 June 1949		Lionel George Curtis	1872–1955	Soldier and author
1 January 1951		Sir Stafford Cripps	1889–1952	Politician
1 January 1951		Robert Menzies	1894–1978	Prime Minister of Australia
7 June 1951		Sidney Holland	1893–1961	Prime Minister of New Zealand
30 November 1951		Herbert Morrison	1888–1965	Politician
5 June 1952		Walter Elliot	1888–1958	Scottish Unionist politician
1 January 1953		E. M. Forster	1879–1970	Novelist
1 June 1953		Benjamin Britten	1913–1976	Composer
1 June 1953		James Chuter Ede	1882–1965	Labour politician
1 June 1953		Ian Fraser	1897–1974	Conservative politician
1 June 1953		Tom Johnston	1881–1965	Labour politician
10 November 1953		The Lord Cherwell	1886–1957	Physicist
1 January 1954		John Christie	1882–1962	Founder of Glyndebourne Festival Opera
8 January 1954		Rab Butler	1902–1982	Politician
10 June 1954		W. Somerset Maugham	1874–1965	Writer
21 December 1954		René Massigli	1888–1988	French diplomat
1 January 1955		Harry Crookshank	1893–1961	Conservative politician
1 January 1955		Hugh Martin	1890–1964	Christian activist
9 June 1955		Henry Moore	1898–1986	Sculptor
2 January 1956		The Viscount Cecil of Chelwood	1864–1958	Conservative politician
2 January 1956		Sir John Kotelawala	1897–1980	Prime Minister of Ceylon
2 January 1956		Arthur Waley	1889–1966	Orientalist and sinologist
31 May 1956		Edward Gordon Craig	1872–1966	Theatre practitioner
31 May 1956		Arnold J. Toynbee	1889–1975	Historian
16 July 1956		Nuri al-Said	1888–1958	Prime Minister of Iraq
1 January 1957		John Baillie	1886–1960	Theologian
14 January 1957		James Stuart	1897–1971	Scottish Unionist politician
13 June 1957		Sir Thomas Beecham, Bt	1879–1961	Conductor and musical impresario
13 June 1957		John Gregg	1873–1961	Clergyman, theologian
1 January 1958		The Viscount Nuffield	1877–1963	Industrialist
12 June 1958		Sir Osbert Sitwell, Bt	1892–1969	Writer
1 January 1959		Sir John Beazley	1885–1970	Archaeologist and art historian
1 January 1959		Sir Kenneth Clark	1903–1983	Art historian
13 June 1959		Walter Nash	1882–1968	Prime Minister of New Zealand
1 January 1960		Alan Lennox-Boyd	1904–1983	Politician
31 December 1960		The Earl of Limerick	1888–1967	Soldier
31 December 1960		Tunku Abdul Rahman	1903–1990	Prime Minister of Malaysia
10 June 1961		C. H. Dodd	1884–1973	Theologian
1 January 1962		Walter Matthews	1881–1973	Church of England priest
2 June 1962		The Lord Hailes	1901–1974	Politician
20 July 1962		Selwyn Lloyd	1904–1978	Politician
20 July 1962		John Maclay	1905–1992	Politician
20 July 1962		Harold Watkinson	1910–1995	Politician
1 January 1963		Keith Holyoake	1904–1983	Prime Minister of New Zealand
14 May 1963		Paul-Henri Spaak	1899–1972	Belgian politician and statesman
1 January 1964		I. A. Richards	1893–1979	Literary critic
1 December 1964		Henry Brooke	1903–1984	Politician
1 January 1965		The Lord Silkin	1889–1972	Politician
12 June 1965		Patrick Blackett	1897–1974	Physicist
12 June 1965		Manny Shinwell	1884–1986	Politician
1 January 1966		Graham Greene	1904–1991	Writer
1 January 1966		The Baroness Summerskill	1901–1980	Physician, politician, writer
19 May 1966		Jim Griffiths	1890–1975	Politician
19 May 1966		Lady Megan Lloyd George	1902–1966	Politician
1 January 1967		Sir William Lawrence Bragg	1890–1971	Physicist
1 January 1967		Sir Mortimer Wheeler	1890–1976	Archaeologist
5 January 1967		Douglas Houghton	1898–1996	Politician
10 June 1967		Sir Arthur Bryant	1899–1985	Historian and writer
10 June 1967		Sir Harold Hartley	1878–1972	Chemist
10 June 1967		The Lord Reid	1890–1975	Judge and politician
14 June 1967		Harold Holt	1908–1967	Prime Minister of Australia
1 January 1968		The Lord Boyd-Orr	1880–1971	Biologist, head of FAO
1 January 1968		Ernest Alexander Payne	1902–1980	Baptist administrator
1 January 1968		The Lord Robbins	1898–1994	Economist, academic
8 June 1968		Patrick Gordon Walker	1907–1980	Politician
1 January 1969		Sir Adrian Boult	1889–1983	Conductor
1 January 1969		Sir John McEwen	1900–1980	Prime Minister of Australia
1 January 1969		Michael Stewart	1906–1990	Politician
14 June 1969		Sir John Barbirolli	1899–1970	Conductor
14 June 1969		Sir Allen Lane	1902–1970	Publisher
14 June 1969		Eric Williams	1911–1981	Prime Minister of Trinidad and Tobago
1 January 1970		Sir James Chadwick	1891–1974	Physicist, discovered the neutron
1 January 1970		Sir A. P. Herbert	1890–1971	Writer and advocate of law reform
1 January 1970		Lee Kuan Yew	1923–2015	Singaporean politician
14 June 1970		Sir Frederick Ashton	1904–1988	Dancer and choreographer
14 June 1970		Dame Sybil Thorndike	1882–1976	Actress
1 January 1971		Sir Maurice Bowra	1898–1971	Classicist
12 June 1971		Charles Best	1899–1978	Medical researcher
12 June 1971		Sir Arthur Bliss	1891–1975	Composer
12 June 1971		John Gorton	1911–2002	Prime Minister of Australia
14 June 1971		Joseph Luns	1911–2002	Dutch politician
1 January 1972		William McMahon	1908–1988	Prime Minister of Australia
1 January 1972		Sir Peter Medawar	1915–1987	Biologist
22 January 1972		Jean Monnet	1888–1979	French economist and diplomat
3 June 1972		The Lord Goodman	1915–1995	Lawyer, administrator
3 June 1972		Herbert Howells	1892–1983	Composer
3 June 1972		John Piper	1903–1992	Artist
1 January 1973		Jack Marshall	1912–1988	New Zealand politician
1 January 1973		Sir Robert Mayer	1879–1985	Businessman and philanthropist
1 January 1973		Duncan Sandys	1908–1987	Politician
2 June 1973		Bernard Leach	1887–1979	Potter
2 June 1973		Irene Ward	1895–1980	Politician
1 January 1974		The Lord Cohen of Birkenhead	1900–1977	Physician
1 January 1974		The Countess of Limerick	1897–1981	Humanitarian, prominent in Red Cross
1 January 1974		William Whitelaw	1918–1999	Politician
5 April 1974		The Lord Hailsham of St Marylebone	1907–2001	Politician
15 June 1974		David Jones	1895–1974	Poet
15 June 1974		Nathaniel Micklem	1888–1976	Theologian
1 January 1975		Jack Ashley	1922–2012	Politician
1 January 1975		The Lord Gardiner	1900–1990	Politician
1 January 1975		Max Perutz	1914–2002	Molecular biologist
29 April 1975		Arnold Smith	1915–1994	Canadian diplomat
14 June 1975		The Lord Aylestone	1905–1994	Politician
14 June 1975		The Lord Morris of Borth-y-Gest	1896–1979	Judge
1 January 1976		John Diefenbaker	1895–1979	Prime Minister of Canada
27 May 1976		The Lord Elwyn-Jones	1909–1989	Politician
27 May 1976		Edward Short	1912–2012	Politician
31 December 1976		Cledwyn Hughes	1916–2001	Politician
31 December 1976		Jack Jones	1913–2009	Trade unionist
31 December 1976		F. R. Leavis	1895–1978	Academic, literary critic
26 January 1977		Malcolm Fraser	1930–2015	Prime Minister of Australia
11 June 1977		Sir John Gielgud	1904–2000	Actor
11 June 1977		Robert Muldoon	1921–1992	Prime Minister of New Zealand
11 June 1977		The Baroness Wootton of Abinger	1897–1988	Sociologist, criminologist
3 June 1978		Michael Somare	1936-2021	Prime Minister of Papua New Guinea
12 June 1979		Denis Healey	1917–2015	Politician
16 June 1979		Sir Michael Tippett	1905–1998	Composer
31 December 1979		The Lord Thorneycroft	1909–1994	Politician
14 June 1980		The Lord Soames	1920–1987	Politician
31 December 1980		Victor Pasmore	1908–1998	Artist
30 April 1981		Brian Talboys	1921–2012	New Zealand politician
13 June 1981		The Lord Boyle of Handsworth	1923–1981	Politician
13 June 1981		Frederick Sanger	1918–2013	Biochemist
31 December 1981		Doug Anthony	1929–2020	Australian politician
31 December 1981		Dame Ninette de Valois	1898–2001	Dancer, choreographer, teacher, and director of ballet
12 June 1982		Sir Karl Popper	1902–1994	Philosopher
11 June 1983		The Lord Carrington	1919–2018	Politician
11 June 1983		Lucian Freud	1922–2011	Artist
31 December 1983		Sir Steven Runciman	1903–2000	Historian
31 December 1983		Sir Sacheverell Sitwell, Bt	1897–1988	Art critic and writer
16 June 1984		The Viscount Eccles	1904–1999	Politician
16 June 1984		Friedrich Hayek	1899–1992	Economist and philosopher
16 June 1984		Sir Philip Powell	1921–2003	Architect
4 July 1984		Pierre Trudeau	1919–2000	Prime Minister of Canada
31 December 1984		Sir Hugh Casson	1910–1999	Architect and broadcaster
15 June 1985		Philip Larkin	1922–1985	Poet
15 June 1985		Rodney Robert Porter	1917–1985	Biochemist
21 May 1986		Sir Keith Joseph, Bt	1918–1994	Politician
31 December 1986		Sydney Brenner	1927–2019	Biologist
31 December 1986		Sir John Summerson	1904–1992	Architectural historian
13 June 1987		Dadie Rylands	1902–1999	Academic and theatre director
13 June 1987		Sir Peter Scott	1909–1989	Naturalist and conservationist
31 July 1987		Norman Tebbit	1931–2025	Politician
31 December 1987		Anthony Powell	1905–2000	Author
17 June 1989		Stephen Hawking	1942–2018	Physicist
30 December 1989		David Lange	1942–2005	Prime Minister of New Zealand
13 April 1992		Kenneth Baker	b. 1934	Politician
13 April 1992		Peter Brooke	1934–2023	Politician
13 April 1992		Tom King	b. 1933	Politician
13 June 1992		Dame Elisabeth Frink	1930–1993	Artist
13 June 1992		Joseph Needham	1900–1995	Biochemist and sinologist
31 December 1992		Sir Victor Pritchett	1900–1997	Writer
12 June 1993		C. H. Sisson	1914–2003	Writer
12 June 1993		Elsie Widdowson	1906–2000	Nutritionist
31 December 1993		David Astor	1912–2001	Newspaper publisher
31 December 1993		Dame Janet Baker	b. 1933	Opera singer
31 December 1993		Sir John Smith	1923–2007	Politician
11 June 1994		Sir Alec Guinness	1914–2000	Actor
11 June 1994		Reginald Victor Jones	1911–1997	Physicist, scientific military intelligence expert
11 June 1994		The Lord Owen	b. 1938	Politician
31 December 1994		César Milstein	1927–2002	Biochemist
31 December 1994		Carel Weight	1908–1997	Artist
17 June 1995		Sir Denys Lasdun	1914–2001	Architect
17 June 1995		Sir Nevill Francis Mott	1905–1996	Physicist
30 December 1995		Sir David Attenborough	b. 1926	Broadcaster and naturalist
30 December 1995		Sir Richard Doll	1912–2005	Epidemiologist
30 December 1995		Douglas Hurd	b. 1930	Politician
30 December 1995		Derek Worlock	1920–1996	Roman Catholic Archbishop of Liverpool
15 June 1996		The Lord Howe of Aberavon	1926–2015	Politician
31 December 1996		A. L. Rowse	1903–1997	Historian
14 June 1997		David Hockney	1937–2026	Artist
2 August 1997		Michael Heseltine	b. 1933	Politician
31 December 1997		Eric Hobsbawm	1917–2012	Historian
31 December 1997		Chris Patten	b. 1944	Politician and governor of Hong Kong
13 June 1998		Peter Brook	1925–2022	Theatre director
31 December 1998		John Major	b. 1943	Politician
31 December 1998		Bridget Riley	b. 1931	Artist
31 December 1998		John de Chastelain	b. 1937	Canadian general and diplomat
31 December 1999		Richard Hamilton	1922–2011	Artist
31 December 1999		Doris Lessing	1919–2013	Writer
31 December 1999		Chad Varah	1911–2007	Founder of The Samaritans
11 May 2000		Amartya Sen	b. 1933	Indian economist
30 December 2000		Sir Harrison Birtwistle	1934-2022	Composer
30 December 2000		Paul Scofield	1922–2008	Actor
16 June 2001		Sir Colin Davis	1927–2013	Conductor
31 December 2001		Sir George Christie	1934–2014	Opera manager
12 June 2002		Bernard Haitink	1929–2021	Dutch conductor
15 June 2002		Harold Pinter	1930–2008	Playwright
15 June 2002		Sir Michael Howard	1922–2019	Historian
31 December 2002		Sir Howard Hodgkin	1932–2017	Artist
31 December 2002		James Lovelock	1919–2022	Scientist and environmentalist
31 December 2002		Sir Denis Mahon	1910–2011	Art historian
14 June 2003		Sir Charles Mackerras	1925–2010	Conductor
14 June 2003		Dan McKenzie	b. 1942	Geophysicist
14 June 2003		The Lord Hannay of Chiswick	b. 1935	Diplomat
11 June 2005		Dame Judi Dench	b. 1934	Actress
2006		Anthony Pawson	1952–2013	Microbiologist
31 December 2007		Sir Ian McKellen	b. 1939	Actor
14 June 2008		Richard Rogers	1933–2021	Architect
11 June 2011		Michael Howard	b. 1941	Politician
20 September 2012		Sir George Young, Bt	b. 1941	Politician
29 December 2012		Sebastian Coe	b. 1956	Athlete, politician, organiser of 2012 Olympics
29 December 2012		Peter Higgs	1929–2024	Physicist
7 January 2013		The Lord Strathclyde	b. 1960	Politician
15 June 2013		Sir Menzies Campbell	1941–2025	Politician
15 June 2013		Sir Nicholas Serota	b. 1946	Museum curator
31 December 2013		Peter Maxwell Davies	1934–2016	Composer and conductor
31 December 2013		The Baroness O'Neill of Bengarve	b. 1941	Philosopher
14 June 2014		Dame Maggie Smith	1934–2024	Actress
22 July 2014		Kenneth Clarke	b. 1940	Politician
1 January 2015		Paddy Ashdown	1941–2018	Politician
1 January 2015		Sir Adrian Cadbury	1929–2015	Businessman
1 January 2015		Dame Mary Peters	b. 1939	Athlete
1 January 2015		The Lord Young of Graffham	1932–2022	Politician
13 June 2015		Sir Neville Marriner	1924–2016	Conductor
13 June 2015		The Lord Woolf	b. 1933	Judge
30 November 2015		Desmond Tutu	1931–2021	Clergyman and activist
31 December 2015		Sir Roy Strong	b. 1935	Art historian
11 June 2016		Dame Vera Lynn	1917–2020	Singer
11 June 2016		The Lord Smith of Kelvin	b. 1944	Businessman
11 June 2016		The Baroness Amos	b. 1954	Politician and diplomat
4 August 2016		George Osborne	b. 1971	Politician
31 December 2016		Sir Roger Bannister	1929–2018	Athlete
31 December 2016		Sir Richard Eyre	b. 1943	Director and playwright
31 December 2016		Dame Evelyn Glennie	b. 1965	Percussionist
31 December 2016		Sir Alec Jeffreys	b. 1950	Geneticist
31 December 2016		The Baroness Warnock	1924–2019	Philosopher
31 December 2016		The Baroness Williams of Crosby	1930–2021	Politician
16 June 2017		Sir Terence Conran	1931–2020	Designer
16 June 2017		Sir Mark Elder	b. 1947	Conductor
16 June 2017		Dame Beryl Grey	1927–2022	Ballet dancer
16 June 2017		Sir Paul McCartney	b. 1942	Musician
16 June 2017		J. K. Rowling	b. 1965	Author
16 June 2017		Dame Stephanie Shirley	1933–2025	Entrepreneur and philanthropist
16 June 2017		Delia Smith	b. 1941	Cook and writer
16 June 2017		The Lord Stern of Brentford	b. 1946	Economist
16 June 2017		Sir John Sulston	1942–2018	Biologist
30 December 2017		Melvyn Bragg	b. 1939	Broadcaster
30 December 2017		Lady Antonia Fraser	b. 1932	Author
30 December 2017		Margaret MacMillan	b. 1943	Historian
9 June 2018		Richard Henderson	b. 1945	Biologist
9 June 2018		Dame Kiri Te Kanawa	b. 1944	Opera singer
29 December 2018		Margaret Atwood	b. 1939	Author
10 September 2019		Sir Patrick McLoughlin	b. 1957	Politician
28 December 2019		Sir Elton John	b. 1947	Musician
28 December 2019		Sir Keith Thomas	b. 1933	Historian
10 October 2020		Sir Paul Smith	b. 1946	Fashion designer
31 December 2020		Sir David Chipperfield	b. 1953	Architect
1 January 2022		Sir Paul Nurse	b. 1949	Geneticist
1 January 2022		The Lord Field of Birkenhead	1942–2024	Politician
1 June 2022		Sir Quentin Blake	b. 1932	Illustrator
1 June 2022		Sir Salman Rushdie	b. 1947	Writer
1 June 2022		Dame Marina Warner	b. 1946	Academic
30 December 2022		Sir Michael Marmot	b. 1945	Academic
30 December 2022		Dame Mary Quant	1930–2023	Fashion designer
9 June 2023		Sir Bill Cash	b. 1940	Politician
16 June 2023		Sir John Bell	b. 1952	Physician
16 June 2023		Ian McEwan	b. 1948	Writer
16 June 2023		Dame Anna Wintour	b. 1949	Media executive
29 December 2023		Dame Shirley Bassey	b. 1937	Singer
23 April 2024		The Princess of Wales	b. 1982	Royal family
14 June 2024		Gordon Brown	b. 1951	Former Prime Minister of the United Kingdom
30 December 2024		Sir Kazuo Ishiguro	b. 1954	Novelist and screenwriter
14 June 2025		Dame Jocelyn Bell Burnell	b. 1943	Physicist
14 June 2025		Sir Antony Gormley	b. 1950	Sculptor
13 June 2026		Sir Donald McCullin	b. 1935	Photojournalist
13 June 2026		Dame Helen Mirren	b. 1945	Actress
