= Roger Bannister =

English athlete who ran the first sub-4-minute mile (1929–2018)

Sir Roger Bannister CH CBE FRCP
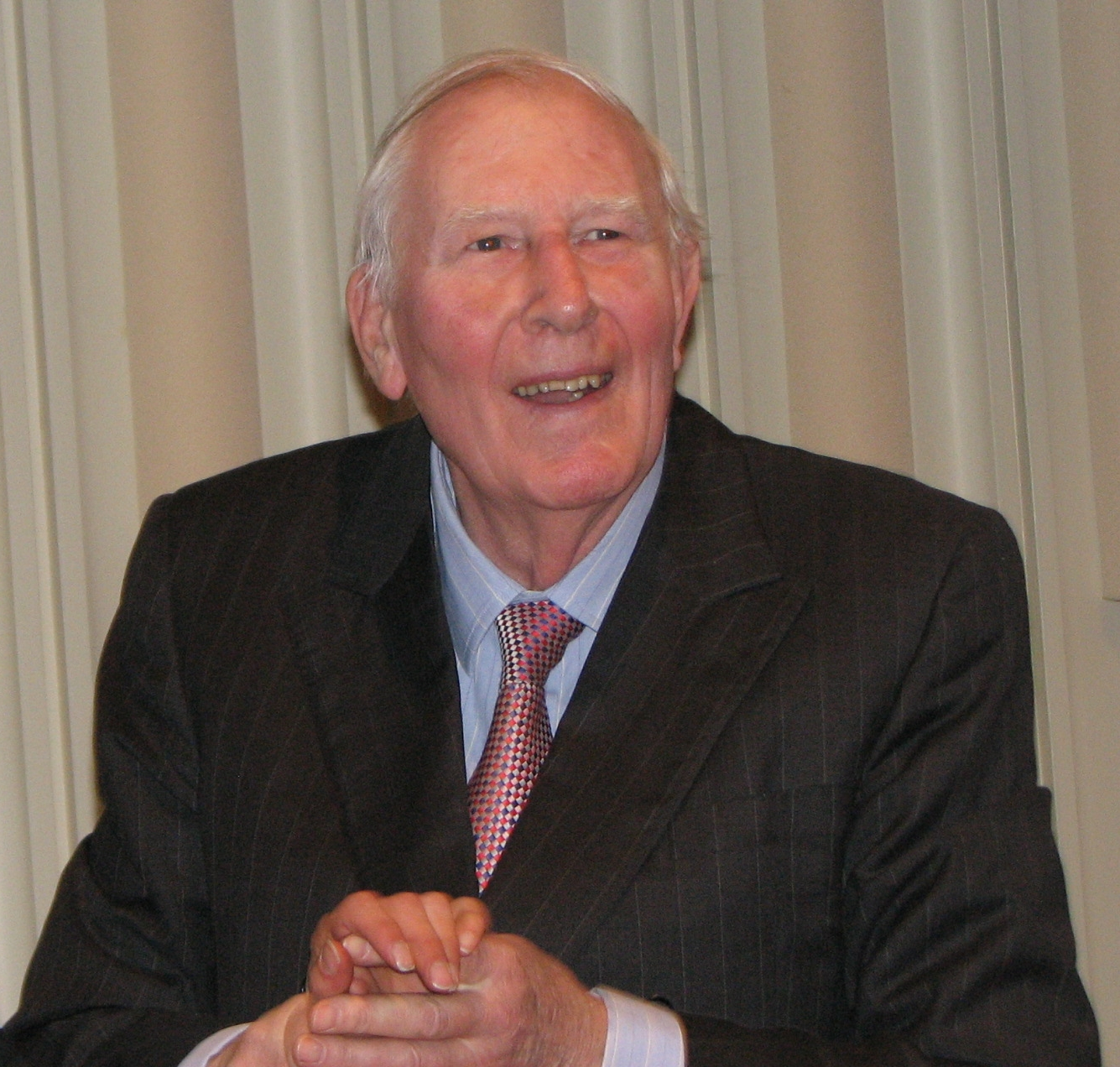
- Bannister in 2009

Personal information
- Born: 23 March 1929 Harrow, England
- Died: 3 March 2018 (aged 88) Oxford, England
- Resting place: Wolvercote Cemetery, Oxford, England
- Education: Exeter College, Oxford; St Mary's Hospital Medical School, London
- Height: 6 ft 2 in (1.88 m)
- Weight: 11 st (150 lb; 70 kg)

Master of Pembroke College, Oxford
- In office 1985–1993
- Preceded by: Geoffrey Arthur
- Succeeded by: Robert Stevens

Sport
- Country: Great Britain
- Sport: Athletics/Track; middle-distance running
- Events: Mile; 800 metres; 1500 metres
- Club: University of Oxford AC; Achilles Club

Achievements and titles
- Personal bests: Outdoor; 800 m: 1:50.7 (Brussels 1950); 1500 m: 3:43.8 (Bern 1954); Mile: 3:58.8 (Vancouver 1954)
Medal record
Men's athletics
Representing England
British Empire and Commonwealth Games
Gold medal – first place	1954 Vancouver	1 mile
Representing Great Britain
European Championships
Gold medal – first place	1954 Bern	1500 m
Bronze medal – third place	1950 Brussels	800 m

Sir Roger Gilbert Bannister (23 March 1929 – 3 March 2018) was an English neurologist and middle-distance athlete who ran the first sub-4-minute mile.

At the 1952 Olympics in Helsinki, Bannister set a British record in the 1500 metres and finished in fourth place. This achievement strengthened his resolve to become the first athlete to finish the mile run in under four minutes. He accomplished this feat on 6 May 1954 at Iffley Road track in Oxford, with Chris Chataway and Chris Brasher providing the pacing. When the announcer, Norris McWhirter, declared "The time was three...", the cheers of the crowd drowned out Bannister's exact time, which was 3 minutes and 59.4 seconds. He had attained this record with minimal training, while practising as a junior doctor. A 2002 Channel 4 poll in the UK saw Bannister's landmark run ranked number 13 in the list of the 100 Greatest Sporting Moments.

Bannister went on to become a neurologist and Master of Pembroke College, Oxford, before retiring in 1993. When asked whether the 4-minute mile was his proudest achievement, he said he felt prouder of his contribution to academic medicine through research into the responses of the nervous system. Bannister was patron of the MSA Trust. He was diagnosed with Parkinson's disease in 2011.

== Early life and education ==
Bannister was born on 23 March 1929 in Harrow, London. His parents, Ralph and Alice, were both from working-class families in Lancashire. Ralph had moved to London at the age of 15 to work in the Civil Service, and met Alice on a trip home. They married in 1925, and had a daughter, Joyce, before Roger was born.

The family moved to Bath shortly after the outbreak of World War II when Ralph was relocated there, and Roger continued his education at City of Bath Boys' School. Here he discovered a talent for cross country running, winning the junior cross-country cup three consecutive times, which led to him being presented with a miniature replica trophy.

During a bombing raid on Bath, the family house was severely damaged as the Bannisters sheltered in the basement.

In 1944, the family returned to London and Roger went to University College School. Bannister was accepted into St John's College, Cambridge but the Senior Tutor Robert Howland, a former Olympic shot putter, suggested that Bannister wait a year. After the year he proceeded to apply to Exeter College, Oxford and was accepted for a three-year degree in medicine.

== Athletics career ==
=== Early running career ===
Bannister was inspired by miler Sydney Wooderson's comeback in 1945. Eight years after setting the mile record and seeing it surpassed during the war years by the Swedish runners Arne Andersson and Gunder Hägg, Wooderson regained his old form and challenged Andersson over the distance in several races. Wooderson lost to Andersson but set a British record of 4:04.2 in Gothenburg on 9 September 1945.

Like Wooderson, Bannister would ultimately set a mile record, see it broken, and then set a new personal best slower than the new record.

Bannister started his running career at Oxford in the autumn of 1946 at the age of 17. He had never worn running spikes previously or run on a track. His training was light, even compared to the standards of the day, but he showed promise in running a mile in 1947 in 4:24.6 on only three weekly half-hour training sessions.

He was selected as an Olympic "possible" in 1948 but declined as he felt he was not ready to compete at that level. However, he was further inspired to become a great miler by watching the 1948 Olympics. He set his training goals on the 1952 Olympics in Helsinki.

In 1949, he improved in the 880-yard (804.67 m) run to 1:52.7 and won several mile races in 4:11. Then, after a period of six weeks with no training, he came in third at White City in 4:14.2.

The year 1950 saw more improvements as he finished a relatively slow 4:13-mile on 1 July with an impressive 57.5 last quarter. Then, he ran the AAA 880 in 1:52.1, losing to Arthur Wint, and then ran 1:50.7 for the 800 m at the European Championships on 26 August, placing third. Chastened by this lack of success, Bannister started to train harder and more seriously.

His increased attention to training paid quick dividends, as he won a mile race in 4:09.9 on 30 December. Then in 1951 at the Penn Relays, Bannister broke away from the pack with a 56.7 final lap, finishing in 4:08.3. Then, in his biggest test to date, he won a mile race on 14 July in 4:07.8 at the AAA Championships at White City before 47,000 people. The time set a meet record and he defeated defending champion Bill Nankeville in the process.

Bannister suffered defeat, however, when Yugoslavia's Andrija Otenhajmer, aware of Bannister's final-lap kick, took a 1500 m race in Belgrade 25 August out at near-record pace, forcing Bannister to close the gap by the bell lap. Otenhajmer won in 3:47.0, though Bannister set a personal best finishing second in 3:48.4. Bannister was no longer seen as invincible.

His training was a very modern individualised mixture of interval training influenced by coach Franz Stampfl with elements of block periodisation, fell running and anaerobic elements of training which were later perfected by Arthur Lydiard.

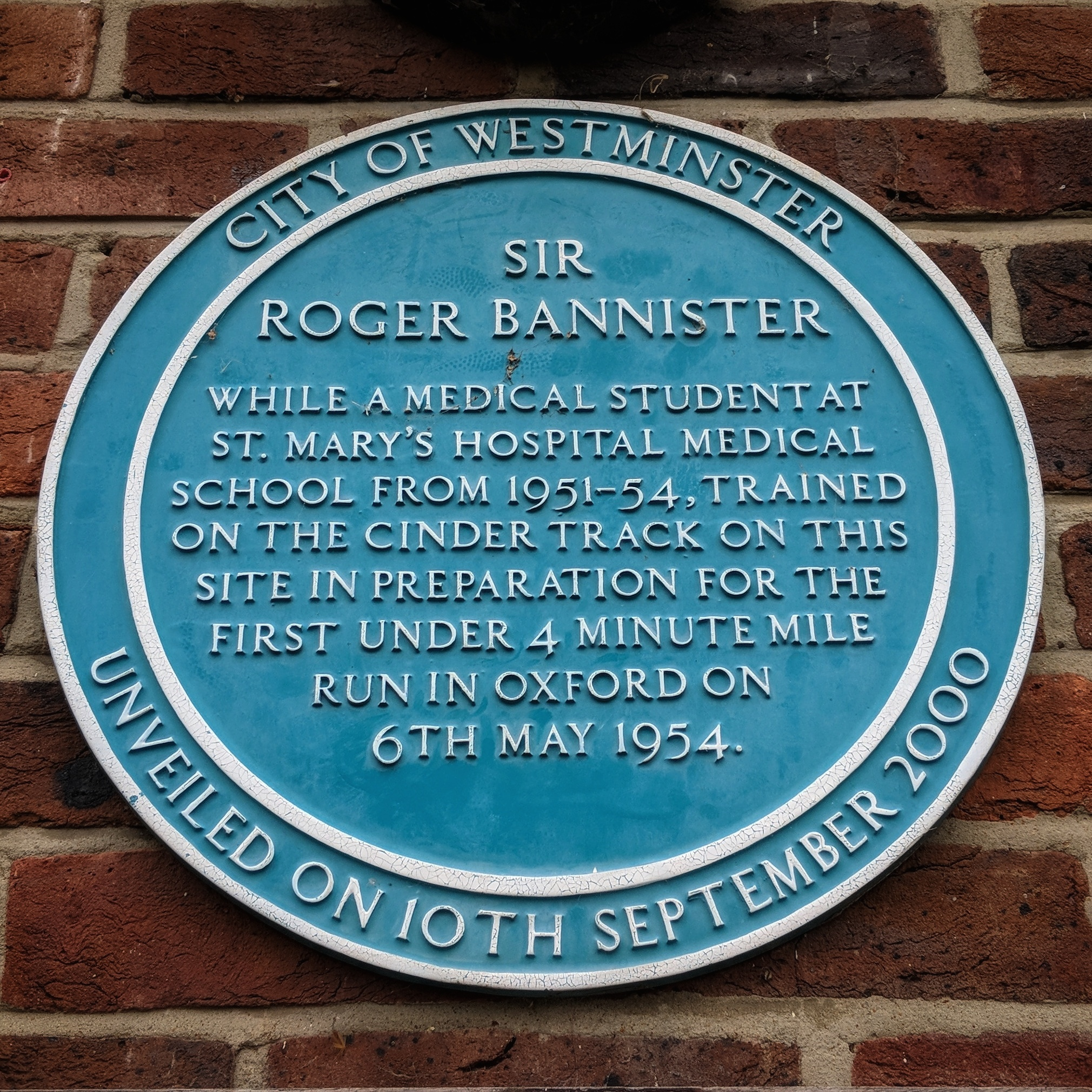
Blue plaque at the Paddington Recreation Ground pavilion

From 1951 to 1954, Bannister trained at the track at Paddington Recreation Ground in Maida Vale while he was a medical student at the nearby St Mary's Hospital. There are two Bannister plaques at the pavilion, both unveiled by him on 10 September 2000; a circular blue plaque and a rectangular historic plaque containing additional information. According to the latter, Bannister was able to train for just an hour each day due to his medical studies.

=== 1952 Olympics ===
Bannister avoided racing after the 1951 season until late in the spring of 1952, saving his energy for Helsinki and the Olympics. He ran an 880-yard (800 m) run on 28 May 1952 in 1:53.00, followed by a 4:10.6-mile time-trial on 7 June, proclaiming himself satisfied with the results. At the AAA championships, he skipped the mile and won the 880 in 1:51.5. Then, 10 days before the Olympic final, he ran a 3/4 mile time trial in 2:52.9, which gave him confidence that he was ready for the Olympics as he considered the time to be the equivalent of a four-minute mile.

His confidence soon dissipated, however, as it was announced there would be semi-finals for the 1500 m at the Olympics, which he felt favoured runners who had much deeper training regimens than he did. When he ran his semi-final, Bannister finished fifth and thereby qualified for the final, but he felt "blown and unhappy".

The 1500 m final on 26 July 1952 would prove to be one of the more dramatic in Olympic history. The race was not decided until the final metres, Josy Barthel of Luxembourg prevailing in an Olympic-record 3:45.28 (3:45.1 by official hand-timing) with the next seven runners all under the old record. Bannister finished fourth, out of the medals, but set a British record of 3:46.30 (3:46.0) in the process.

=== New goal ===
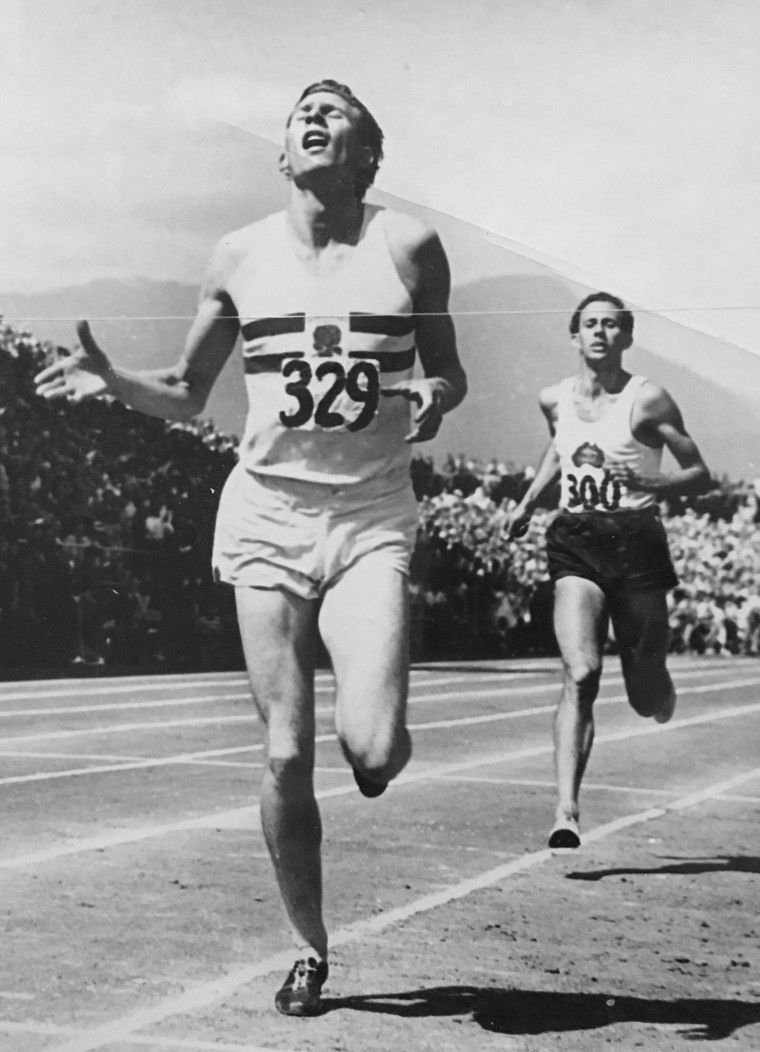
Roger Bannister winning the British Commonwealth Games mile ahead of John Landy in 1954.

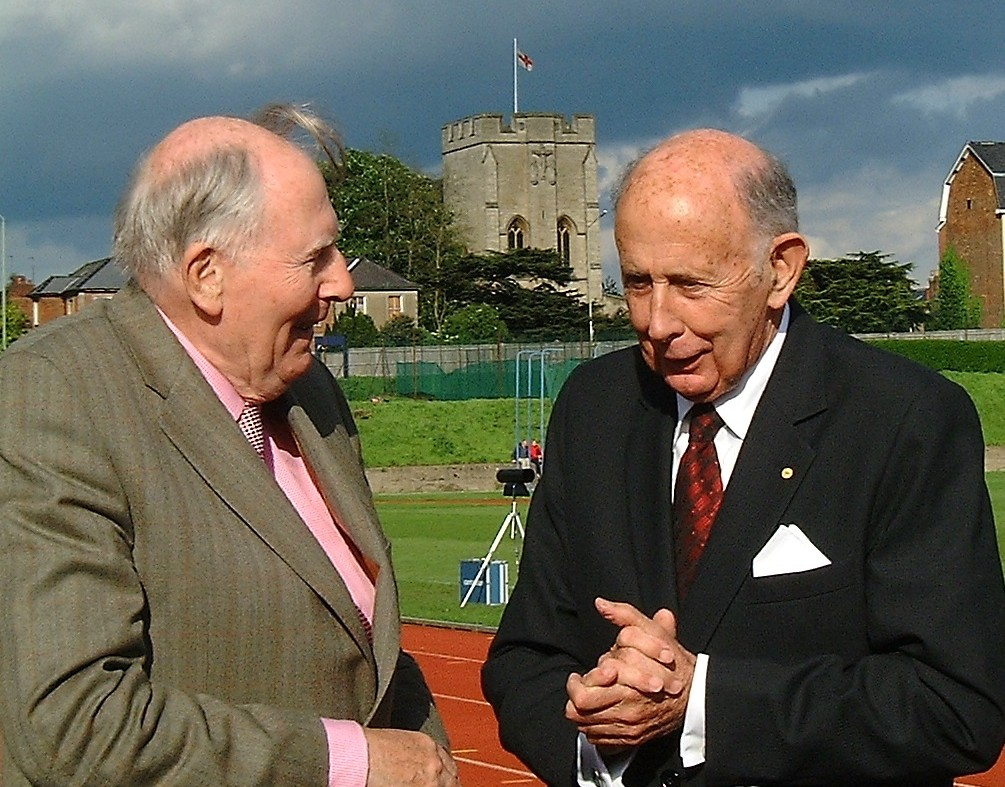
Roger Bannister and John Landy at Iffley Road on the 50th anniversary of the four-minute mile 6 May 2004.

After his relative failure at the 1952 Olympics, Bannister spent two months deciding whether to give up running. He set himself on a new goal: to be the first man to run a mile in under four minutes. Accordingly, he intensified his training and did hard intervals.

On 2 May 1953, he made an attempt on the British record at Oxford. Paced by Chris Chataway, Bannister ran 4:03.6, shattering Wooderson's 1945 standard. "This race made me realise that the four-minute mile was not out of reach," said Bannister.

On 27 June 1953, a mile race was inserted into the programme of the Surrey schools athletic meeting. Australian runner Don Macmillan, ninth in the 1500 m at the 1952 Olympics, set a strong pace with 59.6 for one lap and 1:59.7 for two. He gave up after two and a half laps, but Chris Brasher took up the pace. Brasher had jogged the race, allowing Bannister to lap him so he could be a fresh pace-setter. At 3/4 mile, Bannister was at 3:01.8, the record—and first sub-four-minute mile—in reach. But the effort fell short with a finish in 4:02.0, a time bettered by only Arne Andersson (4:01.6 in 1944) and Gunder Hägg (4:01.4 in 1945). British officials would not allow this performance to stand as a British record, which, Bannister felt in retrospect, was a good decision. "My feeling as I look back is one of great relief that I did not run a four-minute mile under such artificial circumstances," he said.

But other runners were making attempts at the four-minute barrier and coming close as well. American Wes Santee ran 4:02.4 on 5 June 1953, the fourth-fastest mile ever. And at the end of the year, Australian John Landy ran 4:02.0.

Then early in 1954, Landy made some more attempts at the distance. On 21 January 1954, he ran 4:02.4 in Melbourne, then 4:02.6 on 23 February 1954, and at the end of the Australian season on 19 April he ran 4:02.6 again.

Bannister had been following Landy's attempts and was certain his Australian rival would succeed with each one. But knowing that Landy's season-closing attempt on 19 April would be his last until he travelled to Finland for another attempt, Bannister knew he had to make his attempt soon.

=== Sub-4-minute mile ===
This historic event took place on 6 May 1954 during a meet between British AAA and Oxford University at Iffley Road Track in Oxford, watched by about 3,000 spectators. With winds of up to twenty-five miles per hour (40 km/h) before the event, Bannister twice expressed preference for not attempting to break the 4-minute barrier that day; he would try again at another meet. However, the winds dropped just before the race was scheduled to begin, and Bannister did attempt the record.

The pace-setters from his major 1953 attempts, future Commonwealth Games gold medallist Christopher Chataway from the 2 May attempt, and future Olympic Games gold medallist Chris Brasher from the 27 June attempt, combined to provide pacing for Bannister's run. The race was broadcast live by BBC Radio and commentated by 1924 Olympic 100 metres champion Harold Abrahams, of Chariots of Fire fame.

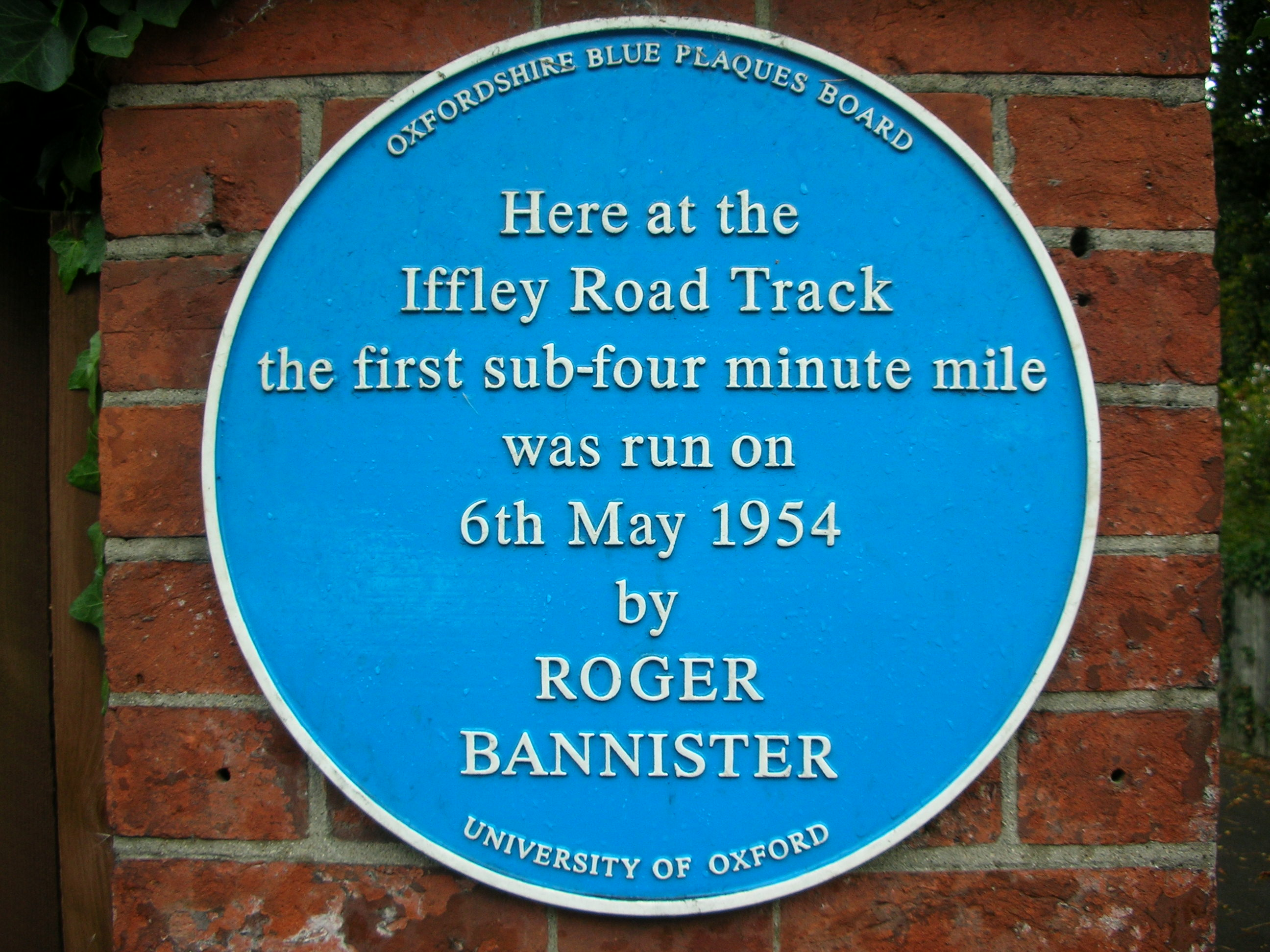
Blue plaque at Oxford University's Iffley Road Track, recording the first sub-4-minute mile run by Roger Bannister on 6 May 1954

Bannister had begun his day at a hospital in London, where he sharpened his racing spikes and rubbed graphite on them so they would not pick up too much cinder ash. He took a mid-morning train from Paddington Station to Oxford, nervous about the rainy, windy conditions that afternoon.

Being a dual-meet format, there were seven men entered in the mile: Alan Gordon, George Dole and Nigel Miller from Oxford University; and four British AAA runners: Bannister, his two pacemakers Brasher and Chataway, and Tom Hulatt. Nigel Miller arrived as a spectator and he only realised that he was due to run when he read the programme. Efforts to borrow a running kit failed and he could not take part, thus reducing the field to six.

The race went off as scheduled at 6:00 pm, and Brasher and Bannister went immediately to the front of the pack. Brasher (wearing No. 44) led both the first lap in 58 seconds and the half-mile in 1:58, with Bannister (No. 41) tucked in behind, and Chataway (No. 42) a stride behind Bannister. Chataway moved to the front after the second lap and maintained the pace with a 3:01 split at the final lap bell. Chataway continued to lead around the front turn until Bannister began his finishing kick with about 275 yards to go (just over half a lap), running the last lap in just under 59 seconds.

The stadium announcer for the race was Norris McWhirter, who went on to co-publish and co-edit the Guinness Book of Records. He teased the crowd by delaying his announcement of Bannister's race time for as long as possible:

Ladies and gentlemen, here is the result of event nine, the one mile: first, number forty one, R. G. Bannister, Amateur Athletic Association and formerly of Exeter and Merton Colleges, Oxford, with a time which is a new meeting and track record, and which—subject to ratification—will be a new English Native, British National, All-Comers, European, British Empire and World Record. The time was three...

The roar of the crowd drowned out the rest of the announcement. Bannister's time was 3 minutes 59.4 seconds.

The claim that a four-minute mile was once thought to be impossible by "informed" observers was and is a widely propagated myth created by sportswriters and debunked by Bannister himself in his memoir, The Four-Minute Mile (1955).

The reason the myth took hold was that four minutes was a round number that lay slightly out of reach of the world record (by just 1.4 seconds) for nine years, which was longer than it might otherwise have been due to the effect of the Second World War in interrupting athletic progress in the combatant countries. Swedish runners Gunder Hägg and Arne Andersson, in a series of head-to-head races in the period 1942–1945, had already lowered the world mile record by five seconds to the pre-Bannister record. Knowledgeable track fans are still most impressed by the fact that Bannister ran a four-minute mile on very low-mileage training by modern standards.

Just 46 days later, on 21 June 1954, Bannister's record was broken by his rival, John Landy, in Turku, Finland, with a time of 3 minutes 57.9 seconds, which the IAAF ratified as 3 minutes 58.0 seconds due to the rounding rules then in effect.

=== 1954 British Empire and Commonwealth Games ===
On 7 August, at the 1954 British Empire and Commonwealth Games in Vancouver, B.C., Bannister, running for England, competed against Landy for the first time in a race billed as "The Miracle Mile". They were the only two men in the world to have broken the 4-minute barrier, with Landy still holding the world record.

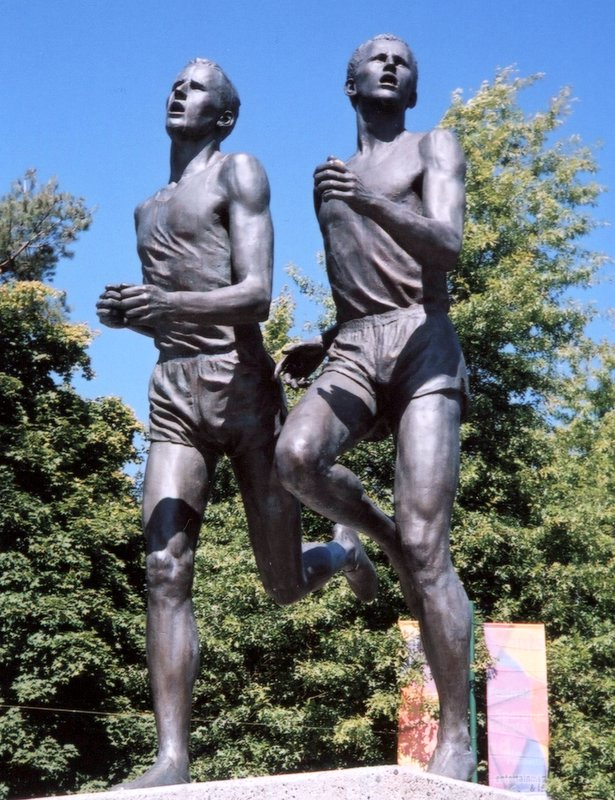
Statue in Vancouver immortalising the moment in "The Miracle Mile" when Roger Bannister passed John Landy, with Landy looking back to gauge his lead

Landy led for most of the race, building a lead of 10 yards in the third lap (of four), but was overtaken on the last bend, and Bannister won in 3 min 58.8 s, with Landy 0.8 s behind in 3 min 59.6 s. Bannister and Landy have both pointed out that the crucial moment of the race was that at the moment when Bannister decided to try to pass Landy, Landy looked over his left shoulder to gauge Bannister's position and Bannister burst past him on the right, never relinquishing the lead.

A larger-than-life bronze sculpture of the two men at that moment was created by Vancouver sculptor Jack Harman in 1967 from a photograph by Vancouver Sun photographer Charlie Warner and stood for many years at the entrance to Empire Stadium; after the stadium was demolished the sculpture was moved a short distance away to the Hastings and Renfrew entrance of the Pacific National Exhibition (PNE) fairgrounds. Regarding this sculpture, Landy quipped: "While Lot's wife was turned into a pillar of salt for looking back, I am probably the only one ever turned into bronze for looking back."

Bannister went on that season to win the so-called metric mile, the 1500 m, at the European Championships in Bern, Switzerland, on 29 August, with a championship record in a time of 3 min 43.8 s. He retired from athletics late in 1954 to concentrate on his work as a junior doctor and to pursue a career in neurology. He was appointed a CBE the following year for "services to amateur athletics".

=== Sports Council and knighthood ===
Bannister later became the first Chairman of the Sports Council (now called Sport England) and was knighted for this service in 1975. Under his patronage, central and local government funding of sports centres and other sports facilities was rapidly increased, and he also initiated the first testing for use of anabolic steroids in sport.

== Medical career ==
After retiring from athletics in 1954, Bannister spent the next forty years practising medicine in the field of neurology. In March 1957, he joined the Royal Army Medical Corps at Crookham, where he started his two years of National Service with the rank of lieutenant.

His major contribution to academic medicine was in the field of autonomic failure, an area of neurology concerning illnesses characterised by the loss of certain automatic responses of the nervous system (for example, elevated heart rate when standing up). He ultimately published more than eighty papers, mostly concerned with the autonomic nervous system, cardiovascular physiology, and multiple system atrophy. He edited Autonomic Failure: A Textbook of Clinical Disorders of the Autonomic Nervous System with C.J. Mathias, a colleague at St Mary's, as well as five editions of Brain and Bannister's Clinical Neurology.

Bannister always said he was more proud of his contribution to medicine than his running career. In 2014, Bannister said in an interview: "I'd rather be remembered for my work in neurology than my running. If you offered me the chance to make a great breakthrough in the study of the autonomic nerve system, I'd take that over the four minute mile right away. I worked in medicine for sixty years. I ran for about eight."

== Personal life ==
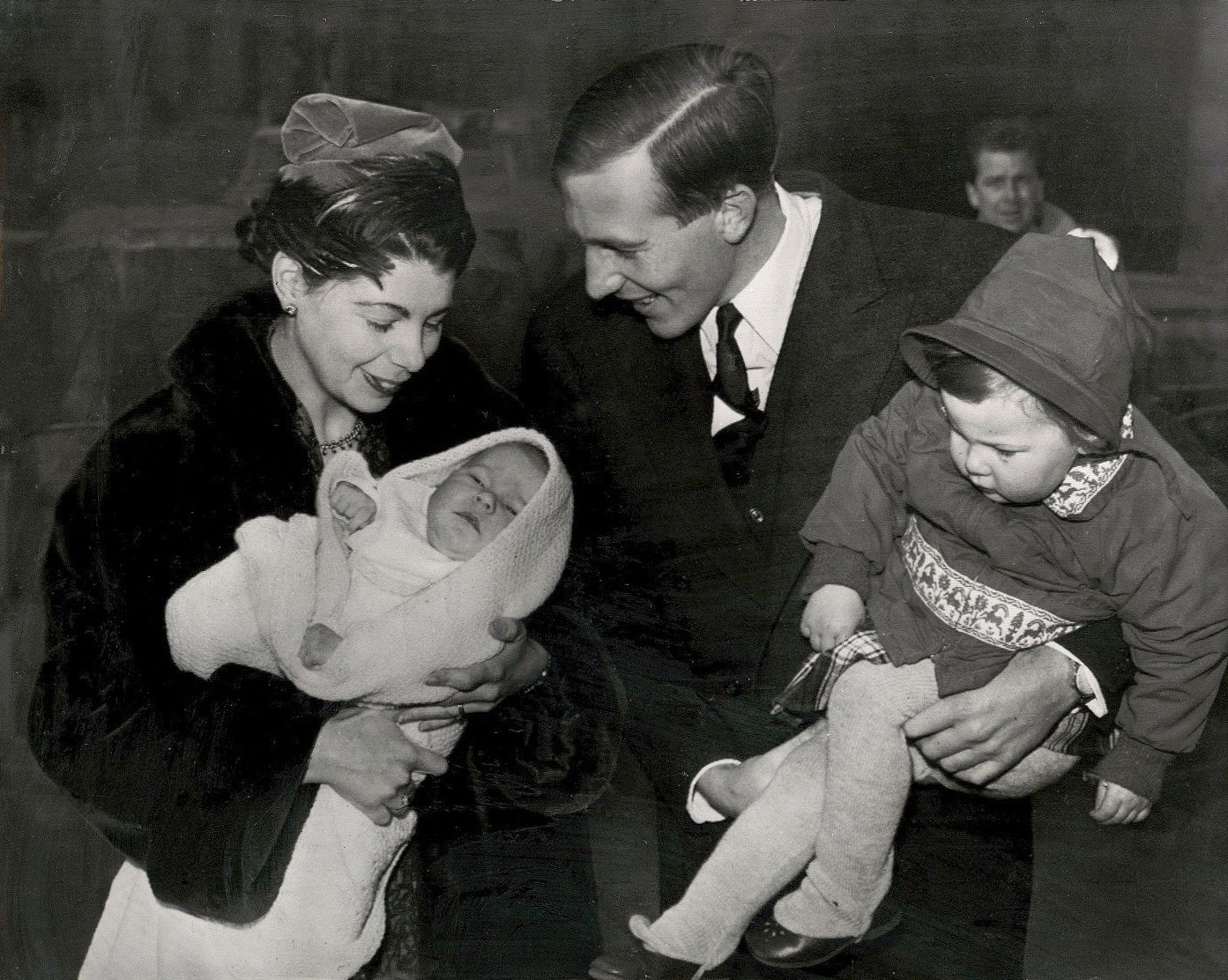
Bannister with wife Moyra, son Clive and daughter Carol in 1959

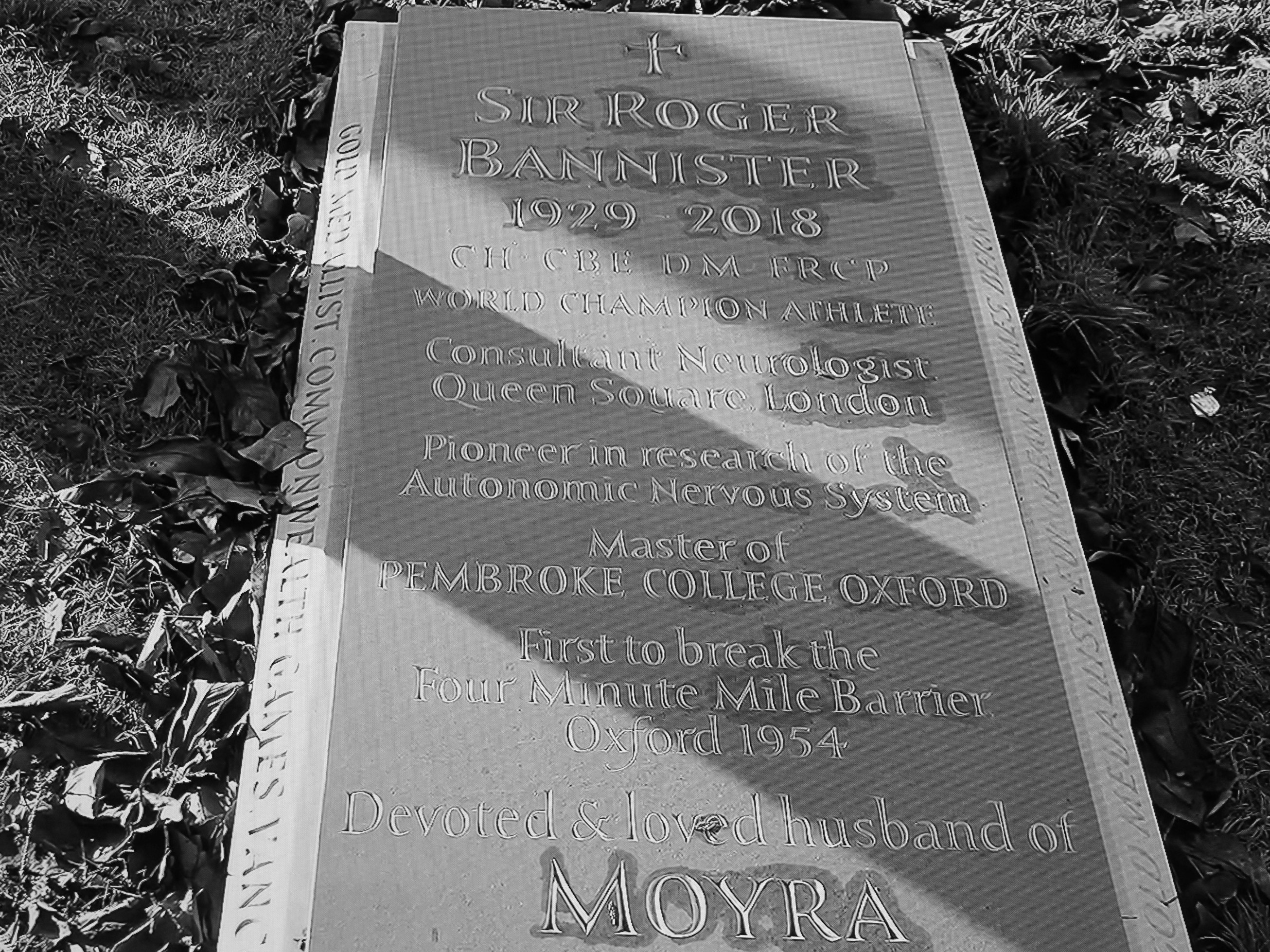
The grave of Bannister, Wolvercote Cemetery in Oxfordshire

In 1955, Bannister married the Swedish artist Moyra Elver Jacobsson in Basel, Switzerland. Moyra Jacobsson-Bannister was the daughter of the Swedish economist Per Jacobsson, who served as managing director of the International Monetary Fund.

They had four children: Carol E. E. Bannister (b. 1957); Clive C. R. Bannister (b. 1959), an insurance industry executive; Thurstan R. R. Bannister (b. July 1960), a company director in New York; and Charlotte B. M. Bannister (b. 1963), now Charlotte Bannister-Parker, associate priest at the University Church of St Mary the Virgin in Oxford.

In 2011, Bannister was diagnosed with Parkinson's disease. He died of pneumonia at the John Radcliffe Hospital in Oxford on 3 March 2018, at the age of 88. He is buried in Wolvercote Cemetery near Oxford. His widow, Lady Moyra Bannister, died in Oxford on 4 November 2022, at the age of 94.

== Legacy ==
On the 50th anniversary of running the mile in under four minutes, Bannister was interviewed by the BBC's sports correspondent Rob Bonnet. At the conclusion of the interview, Bannister was asked whether he looked back on the sub-4-minute mile as the most important achievement of his life. Bannister replied that he instead saw his subsequent forty years of practising medicine and some of the new procedures he introduced as being more significant. He also said that, in terms of athletic achievement, he felt his performances at the 1952 Olympics and the 1954 Commonwealth Games were more significant than running the sub-4-minute mile.

Ironically, although Roger Bannister is arguably the most famous record-setter in the mile, he is also the man who held the record for the shortest period of time, at least since the IAAF started to ratify records.

=== Media ===
For his efforts, Bannister was also made the inaugural recipient of the Sports Illustrated Sportsperson of the Year award for 1954 (awarded in January 1955) and is one of the few non-Americans recognised by the American-published magazine as such.

In a UK poll conducted by Channel 4 in 2002, the British public voted Bannister's historic sub-4-minute mile as number 13 in the list of the 100 Greatest Sporting Moments.

Bannister is the subject of the ESPN film Four Minutes (2005). This film is a dramatisation, its major departures from the factual record being the creation of a fictional character as Bannister's coach, who was actually Franz Stampfl, an Austrian, and secondly his meeting his wife, Moyra Jacobsson, in the early 1950s when in fact they met in London only a few months before the Miracle Mile itself took place. Bannister was portrayed by Jamie Maclachlan.

Bannister: Everest on the Track, The Roger Bannister Story is a 2016 TV documentary about his childhood and youth in WWII and postwar Britain and the breaking of the 4-minute mile barrier, with interviews of participants and witnesses to the 1954 race, and later runners inspired by Bannister and his achievement, including Phil Knight who says that Roger Bannister inspired him to start Nike.

In the 1988 television mini-series The Four Minute Mile, about the rivalry between Bannister, John Landy and Wes Santee to be first to break the 4-minute mile mark, Bannister was portrayed by actor Richard Huw.

=== Places ===
On 14 December 1973 the Black Lion Leisure Centre in Gillingham was officially opened by Bannister, noted in the local media "the runner best known for becoming the first person to run a sub-four-minute mile". The new centre was originally named Black Lion and later redeveloped and rebranded as Medway Park Sports Centre.

In 1996, Pembroke College at the University of Oxford (where Bannister was Master for eight years) named a building in honour of his achievements. The Bannister Building, an 18th-century townhouse in Brewer Street, was converted to provide accommodation for graduate students. Following extensive refurbishments during 2011 and 2012, it became part of the building complex surrounding the Rokos Quad, and was then used for undergraduate accommodation.

In March 2004, St Mary's Hospital Medical School named a lecture theatre after Bannister; on display is the stopwatch that was used to time the race, stopped at 3:59. Bannister also gave his name to the trophy presented to the winning team in the annual athletics varsity match between Imperial College School of Medicine and Imperial College London, as well as the award given to the graduating doctor of Imperial College School of Medicine who has achieved most in the sporting community. Bannister also purchased the cup (which bears his name) awarded to the winning team in the annual United Hospitals Cross-Country Championship, organised by London Universities and Colleges Athletics. The championship is contested by the five medical schools in London and the Royal Veterinary College.

In 2012, Bannister carried the Olympic flame at the site of his memorable feat, in the Oxford University track stadium now named after him.

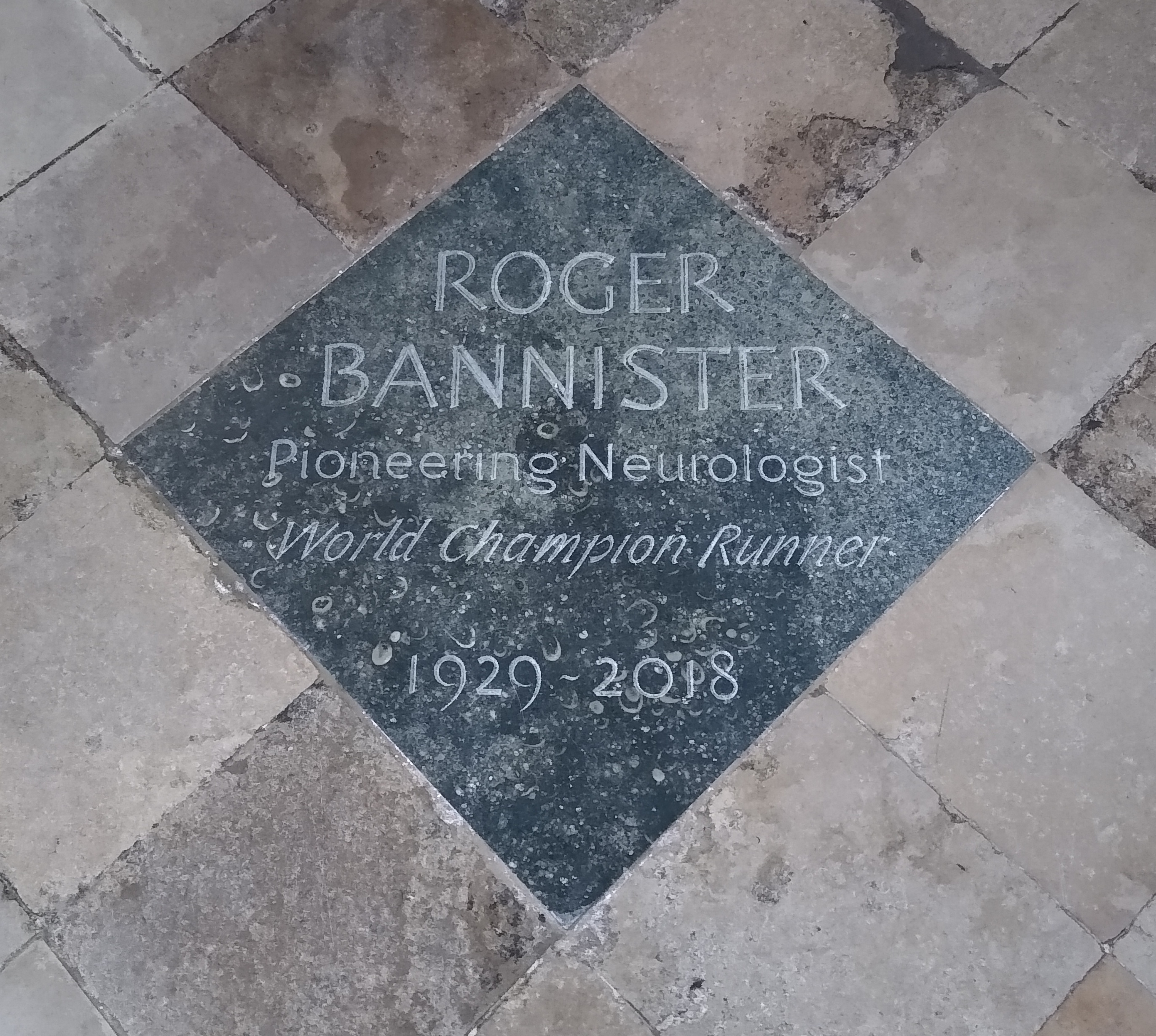
Memorial stone installed in 2021 in Westminster Abbey, London

On 28 September 2021, a memorial stone honouring Sir Roger, "pioneering neurologist, world champion runner", was unveiled in Westminster Abbey, in the area known as "Scientists' corner".

=== Memorabilia ===
The 50th anniversary of Bannister's achievement was marked by a commemorative British 50-pence coin. The reverse of the coin shows the legs of a runner and a stopwatch (stopped at 3:59.4). There were 9,032,500 minted. The coin was re-struck for collector sets in 2019 as part of the Royal Mint's '50 Years of the 50p coin', along with other designs.

In the gallery of Pembroke College dining hall, there is a cabinet containing over 80 exhibits covering Bannister's athletic career and including some academic highlights.

=== Anniversary Races (Note: In the third paragraph, this section references Mile run world record progression.) ===
On 6 May 2024, exactly seventy years after Bannister's sub-four minute mile, hundreds of runners converged in Oxford to run a mile in Bannister's honor. The event saw thousands run a "Community Mile", and several races for elite runners on the Iffley Track. In the elite mile, four athletes broke the four minute barrier, with Italy's Ossama Meslek clocking the fastest mile, at 3:56.15.

This is the second time Iffley Track hosted an anniversary event for Bannister's achievement, with the previous time being in 2004.

Retired, accomplished milers including Steve Cram, Hicham El Guerrouj, Filbert Bayi, Noureddine Morceli, and Eamonn Coghlan attended, all of whom have had the mile world record to their name. Bayi ran 3:51.0 in May 1975, holding the mile world record for three months until August 1975, when John Walker of New Zealand ran 3:49.4. Cram ran 3:46.32 in 1985, holding the mile world record until Noureddine Morceli of Algeria ran 3:44.39 in 1993. On 7 July 1999, El Guerrouj ran 3:43.13, only bested 27 years later by Josh Kerr on 18 July 2026, with the current world record time of 3:42.66. Although not an outdoor record, Coghlan set an indoor mile world record of 3:49.78 in 1983, which was bettered by El Guerrouj in 1997 who ran 3:48.45.

== Awards and honours ==
Bannister received many honours for his achievements in sports and medicine. He was the inaugural Sports Illustrated Sportsman of the Year in 1954. He was also knighted in the 1975 New Year Honours, and appointed Member of the Order of the Companions of Honour (CH) in the 2017 New Year Honours for services to sport.

Bannister was an Honorary Fellow of both Exeter College and Merton College, where he studied at the University of Oxford; he was also Honorary Fellow of Harris Manchester College, Oxford. He received honorary degrees (Doctor of Science) from the University of Sheffield in 1978, and from the University of Bath in 1984. He also received honorary degrees from the University of Pavia in 1986 and from Brunel University London in 2008 (DUniv), as well as an honorary doctorate from Oxford Brookes University in 2014. In 2000, Bannister received the Golden Plate Award of the American Academy of Achievement.

Bannister was made an Honorary Freeman of the London Borough of Harrow on 4 May 2004, and was granted the Freedom of the City of Oxford in 2004.

== Selected publications ==
=== Autobiography ===
- The Four Minute Mile. Dodd, Mead. 1955.
- First Four Minutes. Putnam. 1955.
- Twin Tracks: The Autobiography. London: The Robson Press. 2014. ISBN 978-1-84954-686-7.

=== Academic ===
- Bannister, Roger, ed. (1983). Autonomic failure: a textbook of clinical disorders of the autonomic nervous system. Oxford [Oxfordshire]; New York: Oxford University Press. ISBN 9780192613394.
- Bannister, R.; Mathias, C. J., eds. (1999). Autonomic failure : a textbook of clinical disorders of the autonomic nervous system (4th ed.). Oxford: Oxford University Press. ISBN 0192628518. OCLC 39982611.
- Bannister, Roger; Brain, Walter Russell, eds. (1992). Brain and Bannister's clinical neurology (7th ed.). Oxford: Oxford University Press. ISBN 9780192619136. OCLC 24318711.

== Other media ==
In 2014, he appeared as a guest on BBC Radio 4's Midweek with Libby Purves, Kevin Warwick and Rachael Stirling.

Academic offices
Preceded by Sir Geoffrey Arthur	Master of Pembroke College, Oxford; 1985–1993	Succeeded by Robert Stevens
Records
Preceded by (Sweden) Gunder Hägg	Men's Mile World Record Holder; 6 May – 21 June 1954	Succeeded by (Australia) John Landy
