= Nuno Bernardo =

Portuguese writer, producer and director

- Born: Nuno Miguel Ferreira Bernardo; November 3, 1974 (age 51); Vila do Conde, Porto, Portugal
- Education: Escola Superior de Jornalismo do Porto
- Occupations: Director, producer, writer, published author
- Years active: 1992–present

Nuno Bernardo (born November 3, 1974) is a Portuguese writer, producer, and director. Nuno has become recognized for his ability to create innovative stories that are told across multiple platforms. In the last decade, using his unique approach to storytelling, Nuno has created and produced more than 200 hours of entertainment, from feature films and TV shows to videogames and books.

== Work ==
In 2008, Nuno created Sofia's Diary for Channel 5, and received a Broadcast Awards nomination for the series. C21 Magazine classified Sofia's Diary as "one of the iconic TV shows of the decade" and Broadcast Magazine wrote that "Sofia's Diary helps to write the history of Television in the UK". The series has reached an audience of more than 500 million viewers and has been shown in 30 countries including China, Brazil and Australia. In 2010, the BBC named Nuno Bernardo "a leading world expert in New Media".

As TV producer and showrunner, Nuno Bernardo created and produced Beat Generation, Flatmates, the Kidscreen Award-winner Aisling’s Diary, the Emmy-nominated TV series Final Punishment, Beat Girl, and the film Collider. In North America Nuno Bernardo was the executive producer of two HBO Canada TV Shows: Living in Your Car and The Line, featuring Linda Hamilton and Ed Asner.

As director, Nuno Bernardo helmed and wrote the Emmy-nominated sci-fi film Collider and the TV documentary The Stand Ups. More recently, Nuno produced the feature film The Knot (released by Universal Pictures in the UK), as well as the theatrically-released documentary Road to Revolution. The European Film Promotion agency selected Nuno as a "Producer on the Move" at the Cannes Film Festival in 2014. His next movie is Dublin Rumble, a coming-of-age story set in the world of Mixed Martial Arts. Nuno Bernardo is also a YA author with several books published and one million copies sold around the world. He is a frequent blogger for MIPWORLD and Techcrunch and lecturer TV and film conferences, festivals and entertainment industry events around the world, where he talks about the changing landscape of the entertainment industry and how technology is affecting the storytelling process.

Nuno Bernardo is an EAVE (European Audiovisual Entrepreneurs) alumnus and member of the European Film Academy and the Portuguese Film Academy.

== Selected films and TV series ==
- Collider(UK/Ireland, 2013, director, producer, writer). Released in Portugal and Ireland. Selected to the Geneva Film Festival.
- Beat Girl (UK, Ireland and Portugal, 2013, writer, producer). Released in Portugal, Ireland and UK.
- The Knot (UK/Portugal, 2012, co-producer) Featuring Noel Clarke and Mena Suvari. Released by Universal in the UK.
- A Estrada da Revolução – Road to Revolutionmerda (Portugal, 2014, producer). Documentary released in Portugal in February 2014.
- Dublin Rumble (Ireland/Poland, 2016, writer, director). In development.
- The Stand Ups (Ireland, 2015, director). TV Documentary – 2 * 45’. Broadcaster: TV3 (Ireland).
- Sofia’s Diary (Several territories, 2003-2010, creator, producer, showrunner). Produced for Sony Pictures Television.
- Flatmates (Portugal, Romania and Greece, 2009-2010, creator, writer, producer).
- Aisling’s Diary (Ireland, 2008-2010). Two times Kidscreen winner TV Series. Broadcast in Ireland (RTÉ), Australia (ABC) and Sweden (SVT).
- Final Punishment: The TV Series (Portugal/Brazil, 2009, creator, writer, producer). TV Series nominated to the International EMMY and ROSE D’OR awards.
- The Line (Ireland, 2008-2009, executive producer). Produced in Canada for HBO Canada.
- Living in Your Car (Ireland, 2010-2011, executive producer). Produced in Canada for HBO Canada.
- The Club (2012, producer). Produced for Setanta Sports Ireland.
- Yes I Can (2012, producer). Produced for Setanta Sports Ireland.
- Market Flavours (2013, producer). Produced for FOX International Channels.

== Selected videogames and interactive projects ==
- "Final Punishment ARG" (Portugal/Brazil, 2009, creator, writer, producer). Interactive project nominated to the International EMMY and ROSE D’OR awards.
- “Road to Revolution - Interactive App” (Portugal, 2013-2014, creator, producer).
- “Collider World multi-platform interactive experience” (UK/Ireland, 2013, creator, producer), nominated for an International Digital EMMY.
- "Collider Quest", (Portugal, 2012, producer)
- "Beat Girl: The Game", (UK, 2012, producer)
- "Let Us Prey: Surrender to Hell", (Ireland, 2014, producer)

== Selected books ==
- "Sofia’s Diary Book Series" (Portugal, UK and Brazil). Creator and co-writer.
- "Mariana’s Secret Diary Series" (Portugal). Creator and co-writer.
- "Bia & Fred" (Portugal). Author.
- "As Aventuras do Miguel" (Portugal). Creator and co-writer.
- "Dark Siege" (Portugal). Creator.
- "Collider Graphic Novel" (UK, Ireland and Portugal). Creator.
- "Made with Love" (UK, US). Collaborator with M.K. Shaddix.
- "Beat Girl" (UK, Portugal). Collaborator with Jasmina Kallay.
- "The Producer's Guide to Transmedia: How to Develop, Fund, Produce and Distribute Compelling Stories Across Multiple Platforms". Author.
- "Transmedia 2.0: How to Create an Entertainment Brand Using a Transmedial Approach to Storytelling". Author.
- "Colégio do Templo-1, 2, 3, 4, 5 e 6. Creator
