= Chris Brasher =

London marathon co-founder, athlete, journalist

Chris Brasher CBE
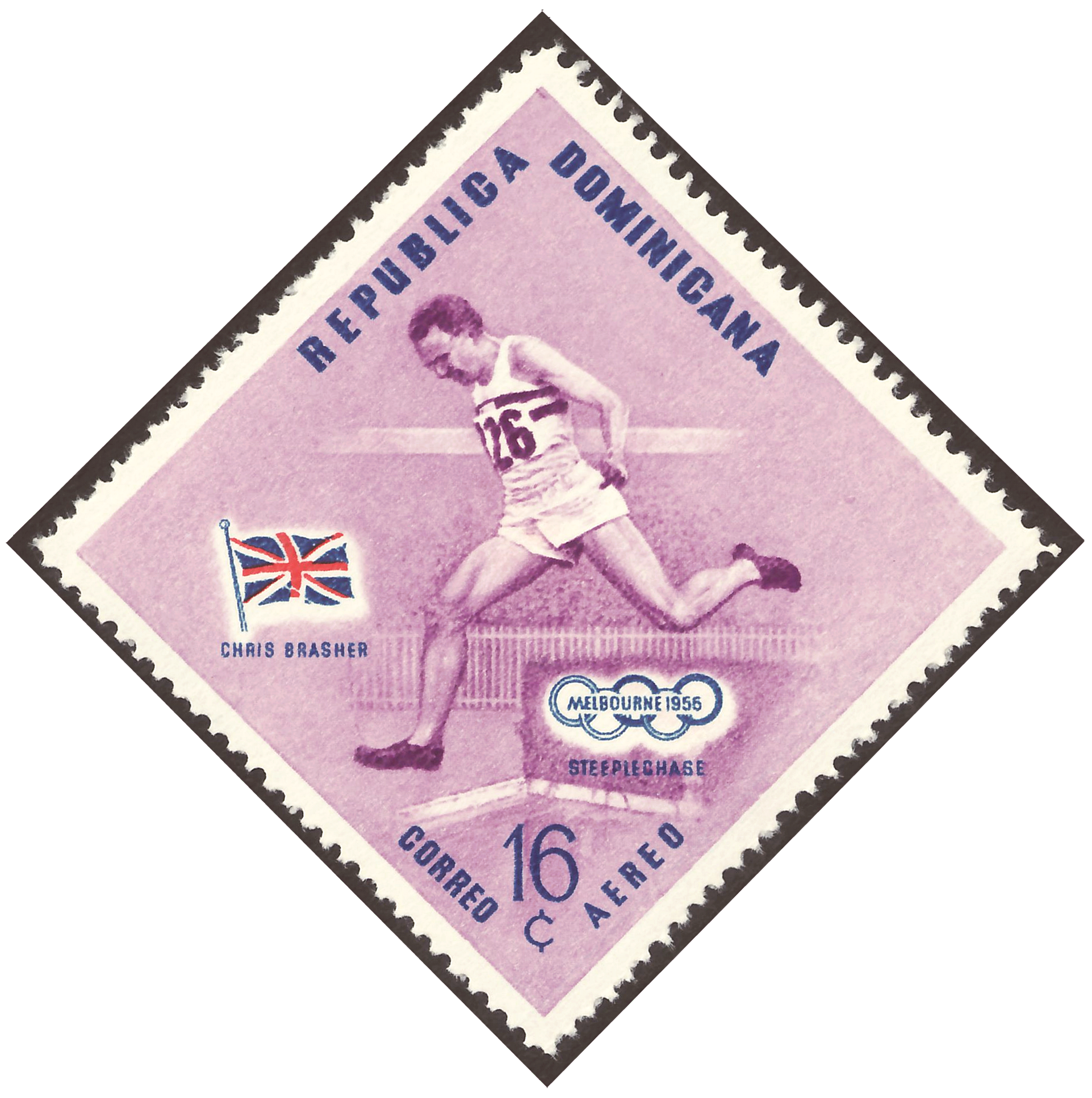

Personal information
- Born: 21 August 1928 Georgetown, British Guiana
- Died: 28 February 2003 (aged 74) Chaddleworth, Berkshire, England
- Occupations: Athlete, sports journalist and co-founder of the London Marathon
- Height: 175 cm (5 ft 9 in)
- Weight: 65 kg (143 lb)
- Spouse: Shirley Bloomer

Sport
- Sport: Athletics
- Event: Steeplechase/middle-distance
- Club: University of Cambridge AC; Achilles Club
Medal record
Men's athletics
Representing Great Britain
Olympic Games
| Gold medal – first place | 1956 Melbourne | 3000 m steeplechase |

Christopher William Brasher CBE (21 August 1928 – 28 February 2003) was a British track and field athlete, Olympic champion, sports journalist and co-founder of the London Marathon.

== Early life and education ==
Born in Georgetown, British Guiana, Brasher went to Rugby School and then St John's College, Cambridge, where he read geology. He was a keen mountaineer, and as a student was president of the Cambridge University Mountaineering Club, and in 1948 led an expedition to Baffin Island with W. A. Deer.

== Sporting career ==
On 6 May 1954, he acted as pacemaker for Roger Bannister when the latter ran the first sub-four-minute mile at Iffley Road Stadium in Oxford. Brasher paced Bannister for the first two laps, while his friend Chris Chataway paced the third. Two years later, at the 1956 Summer Olympics in Melbourne, Brasher finished first in the 3,000 metres steeplechase with a time of 8 minutes 41.2 seconds, but was disqualified for allegedly interfering with another runner, Ernst Larsen of Norway. The following day, after an investigation, he was reinstated as gold medallist. Brasher had been celebrating for several hours before the delayed medal ceremony, and later claimed to have been “the only Olympic champion to be totally and absolutely slaughtered when he received a medal”.

Brasher was on the podium three times at the AAA Championships in the steeplechase event at the 1952 AAA Championships,1955 AAA Championships and the 1956 AAA Championships.

He was one of the pioneers of orienteering in Britain and can claim the first public mention of the sport in an article in The Observer in 1957:

"I have just taken part, for the first time, in one of the best sports in the world. It is hard to know what to call it. The Norwegians call it 'orientation'..."

== Later career ==
He had careers in print journalism, as sports editor for The Observer newspaper, and in broadcasting, as a reporter for the Tonight programme.

He founded Chris Brasher's Sporting Emporium in 1971; this later became Sweatshop. In 1978, he designed the Brasher Boot: a walking boot with the comfort of a running shoe. They were merged with Berghaus under Pentland ownership in 2014, and were discontinued before 2017.

In 1981 John Disley and Brasher founded the London Marathon. In 1983 he became the second president of the Association of International Marathons and Distance Races, an office which he held until 1987.

Also in 1983 Brasher partnered with his longtime friend John Disley to found Fleetfoot Limited in Lancaster. Fleetfoot distributed The Brasher Boot and other sporting goods to retailers. Fleetfoot acquired the rights to be the UK distributor of Reebok and subsequently traded as Reebok UK before becoming a subsidiary of the Pentland Group in 1988.

After the acquisition by Pentland, Brasher remained active in the company as chairman of the board. Reebok UK was sold to Reebok International in 1990 when Pentland Group sold its 55% ownership of Reebok United States and Reebok International.

== Personal life and honours ==
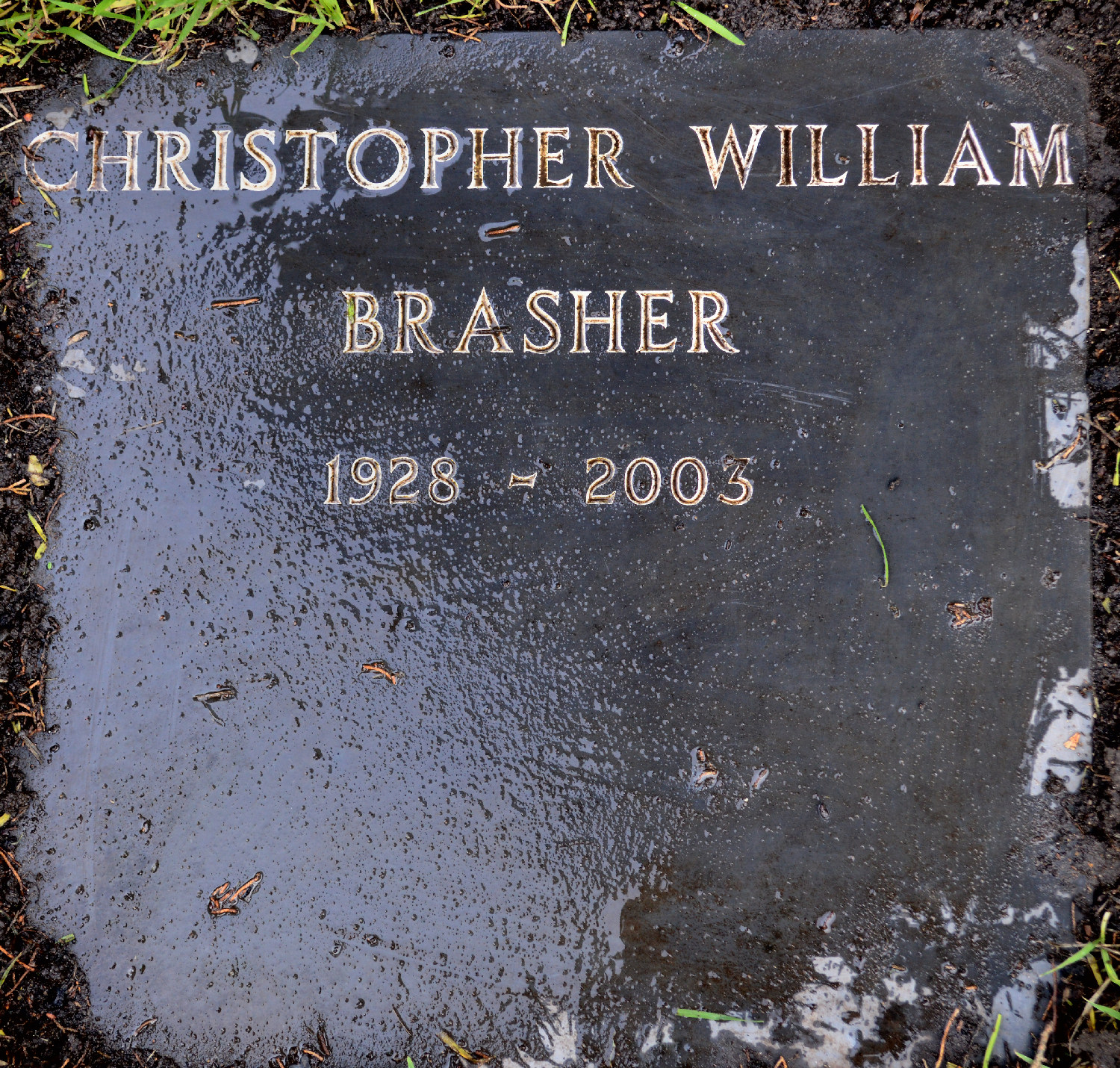
Memorial in St Peter's Church, Petersham

Brasher married the English tennis champion Shirley Bloomer in 1959. He has one son, Hugh Brasher, who is CEO of the London Marathon.

Brasher was awarded the CBE in 1996. He was awarded the Royal Scottish Geographical Society's Livingstone Medal in 2002.

In 2003, he died at his home in Chaddleworth, Berkshire, after struggling for several months against pancreatic cancer. He is buried at St Peter's Church, Petersham, Richmond, England.
