= Sofia's Diary =

- Genre: Video blog Teen drama
- Created by: Nuno Bernardo
- Directed by: Manny Bonett
- Starring: Rachel Hyde-Harvey; Lauren Gordon; Gavin Stenhouse; Georgina Leahy; James Nield; Paul Opacic; Lucia Giannecchini; Heidi Monseni
- Country of origin: United Kingdom
- Original language: English
- No. of seasons: 3
- No. of episodes: 140

Production
- Executive producers: Nuno Bernardo; Serena Cullen; Antony Root; Joanna Shields
- Producer: Triona Campbell
- Camera setup: Ciro Candia
- Running time: Varies

Original release
- Network: Bebo
- Release: 17 March 2008 – 10 June 2009
- Network: Fiver
- Release: 17 April 2008 – 12 June 2009

Sofia's Diary is a drama web series available through the social networking site Bebo, which is the same site that hosts KateModern. A version of Sofia's Diary originally came out in 2003 in Portugal. This means it actually predates the first video of lonelygirl15 which came out in 2006. Sofia is played by 22-year-old Rachel Hyde-Harvey.

Sofia's Diary was the second internet based show to make the transition to UK TV (Tiscali Showcase on C4 being the first in 2007) following its acquisition by Channel Five (from Sony Pictures Television International) on 17 April 2008. The first two seasons of the show were broadcast on 'Fiver' (previously 'Five Life'). Following an 8-month break, Sofia's Diary returned to Bebo to begin a 6-week third season, from 29 May 2009. This season differs to the first two, in that new episodes are only being shown on Tuesdays and Fridays, as opposed to every weekday.

Sure Girl originally sponsored Sofia's Diary. Season 3 of the show is being exclusively sponsored by Transport for London (TfL), to help increase awareness among teenagers of its road safety campaign.

In Vietnam, a version is called Nhật ký Vàng Anh.

== Sofia's life ==
At the start of the series, Sofia was a 17-year-old girl, living with her dad, stepmother and stepbrother (also known as 'Devil Child'). The story began when Sofia found her (now ex) boyfriend kissing her stepsister Trisha. As revenge, she played a trick on her ex, but it backfired and somehow she managed to set the whole chemistry lab on fire. Doing this got her suspended. Her mum then found some ecstasy tablets in her bedroom, so she decided to send her away to London, to live with her dad, his wife and their baby. Her best friend, Sean, later died from a random gunshot. Sofia had to choose between Finn or Josh as her boyfriend. She lives with Alice Clayton Smith.

== Television ==
Due to its success on Bebo, FIVER picked up the series and started airing episodes every day at 5:25 ever since 17 April 2008. An omnibus would air every 2 weeks on a Sunday. Due to slow ratings the singular episodes moved to 4:00 on a weekday basis, the omnibuses were then dropped. FIVER officially cancelled Sofia's Diary on 12 June 2009, saying they had no broadcast right to new episodes and their contract had expired, they also said they had no intention to renew it. The show has now ended on Bebo as well.

== Cast ==
Actor	Character
Rachel Hyde Harvey	Sofia Taylor
Lauren Gordon	Jill Johnson
Gavin Stenhouse	Sean Walker
Paul Opacic	Simon Taylor
Lucia Giannecchini	Emma Taylor
Georgina Leahy	Rebecca Nixon
James Neild	Josh Angelo
Heidi Monsen	Alice Clayton Smith
Dylan Taylor (Devil Child)	Carlos Cortez
Ben Farrow	Tom
Junior Nunoo	Charles
David Avery	Flex
Shaniqua Dell	Wicked Magazine Assistant
Louisa Warren	Wicked Magazine Assistant

== Season 1 ==
Season 1 focuses mainly on Sofia's move from Stockport to London. It focuses on her making brand new friends and fitting in at school. Her videos were uploaded on a weekday basis.

== Season 2 ==
Season 2 focuses mainly on Sofia and Jill's loss of Sean due to a gunshot. It also focuses on Sofia's real friend and her future decisions. Her videos were uploaded on a weekday basis.

== Season 3 ==
Season 3 focuses mainly on road safety and growing up. Jill getting a record label and Sofia moving in with Alice also Wicked Magazine was shut down. Her videos are uploaded on a Tuesday and Friday basis. It ended after one month on 30 June 2009.

== Seasons ==
Season	Episodes	Bebo Premiere	Bebo Finale
1	65	17 March 2008	13 June 2008
2	65	16 June 2008	12 September 2008
3	10	29 May 2009	30 June 2009

== Characters ==
=== Sofia Taylor ===
- Seasons 1-3

The main character, Sofia, works at Wicked magazine, and is enemies with Rebecca Nixon. She was dating Josh Angelo and, later, Finn. She used to live with her dad, stepmother and stepbrother, but now lives with her Wicked boss, Alice Clayton-Smith.

=== Jill Johnson ===
- Seasons 1-3

Jill is Sofia's best friend. She is currently looking to get a job and start her own record label. She used to date Scratch behind her brother's back.

=== Sean Walker ===
- Season 1

Sean was Sofia and Jill's best friend. He was into music and started a band with Jill's brother, Mikey. They had a gig, and on the way home, Sean was shot dead.

=== Rebecca Nixon ===
- Seasons 1-3

Rebecca is Sofia's enemy and works at Wicked magazine. She spends all her time taunting Sofia. She had a crush on Josh (who, at the time, Sofia was dating). She returned to Wicked magazine for the third season.

=== Josh Angelo ===
- Seasons 1-2

Josh was Sofia's workmate and boyfriend. In the video blogs, it was discovered that he is now dating Rebecca, although it is not clear if they are still together in Season 3.

=== Simon Taylor ===
- Seasons 1-2

Simon is Sofia's dad. He is married to Emma ('SMAW') and has a child with her. He has not appeared in the third season. Sofia was sent to live with him.

=== Emma Taylor ('SMAW') ===
- Seasons 1-2

Emma ('SMAW', short for 'Stepmother, Model, Actress, Whatever') is Sofia's mother-in-law. They got off to a rough start, but they patched it up. She has not appeared in the third season.

=== Alice Clayton-Smith ===
- Seasons 1-3

Alice is Sofia's boss and, now, housemate.

=== Wicked Magazine Assistants ===
- Seasons 1-2

Assistants working at Wicked Magazine with Sofia.

== Recurring characters ==
=== Wicked Magazine Assistants ===
- Season 1

Works at Wicked Magazine with Sofia.

=== Jo Ellis ===
- Season 2

Jo is Sofia's old best friend. She still talks to her through Bebo and pops in from time to time.

=== Finn ===
- Season 2

Finn met Sofia, Jill and Jo on a roadtrip. He was dating Sofia.

=== Scratch ===
- Seasons 2-3

Scratch is Sofia's friend and Jill's ex. He broke Jill's heart when he cheated on her. They got back together in season 3, but he got hit by a car and fell into a coma, and didn't survive.

=== Mikey Johnson ===
- Seasons 1-2

Mikey is Jill's older brother.

=== Tom ===
- Seasons 1-2

Tom is Sofia's personal therapist. He was played by Ben Farrow for both seasons.

=== Justin ===
- Season 3

Justin is a wannabee rocker who signed to Jill's fake record label.

=== Flex ===
- Season 3

Flex is best friends with Scratch.

== DVD release ==
Due to its popularity on Bebo and FIVER, Sofia's Diary was released on Region 2 DVD by Sony. It includes every episode from Seasons 1 and 2. It is a two-disc DVD and has alternate endings, letting the viewer decide what Sofia should do in her daily situations. It was rated 12 by the BBFC, and runs for two hours and four minutes.

== Music ==
Music plays a big part in Sofia's Diary. It previews music from The Ting Tings and The Script only to name a few.

== Helpline encouragement ==
From Season 2 onwards, Sofia encouraged teens to call a helpline about gun crime after popular character Sean Walker was killed off on the Season 1 finale. Additionally, from Season 3 onwards Sofia encouraged teens to call a helpline about road safety after Scratch was hit by a car, placed in a coma and killed off in episode 9 of the third season.
