= Jamie Maclachlan =

British actor (born 1981)

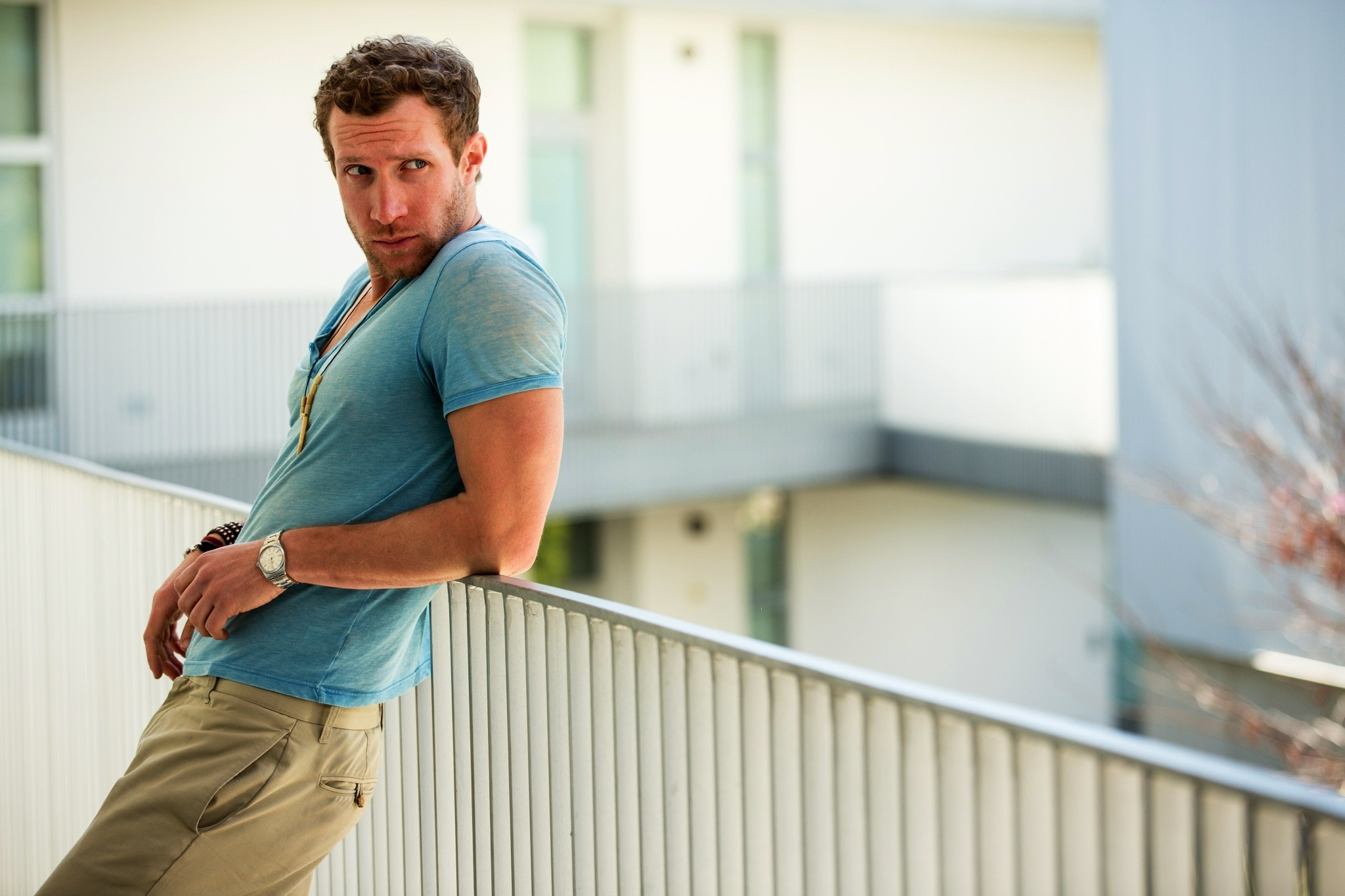
- Jamie Maclachlan in 2013
- Born: 1981 (age 44–45); Paris, France
- Occupation: Actor
- Years active: 2003 - present

Jamie Maclachlan (born 1981) is a British actor best known for playing the lead role of Roger Bannister in the Emmy Award nominated film 'Four Minutes', alongside Christopher Plummer.

== Stage and screen credits ==
=== Filmography ===
Year	Title	Role	Notes
2005	Four Minutes	Roger Bannister	Emmy Award nominated film
2011	The Missing Day	Paul Harper	
2012	Tezz	Reporter	
2013	This Way Out	Reg	
2013	Collider	Luke Spencer	
2014	Maleficent	Soldier	
2018	Outlaw King	Roger De Mowbray	
2026	The Uprising	Walworth's lieutenant	

=== Television ===
Year	Title	Role	Company
2003	Dambusters	Ray Graystone	Tigress
2004	Waking The Dead	Young Joe Brackley	BBC
2006	Surviving Disaster	Dave Wheeler	BBC
2006	The Bill	Jamie Krebbs	Talkback Thames
2009	Jiro Shirasu	Sumner	NHK
2011	Mad Dogs	Drug Runner	Sky
2012	Dark Matters: Twisted But True	Henry Molaison / Klaus Berger	Discovery Channel
2012	Wolfblood	Kyle Weathers	BBC
2013	Dates	Christopher	Balloon for Channel 4
2013	River City	Joe Dearnon	BBC Scotland
2014	Gunpowder 5/11: The Greatest Terror Plot	Guy Fawkes	Aenon for BBC
2015	Indian Summers	Capt Billy Farquhar	New Pictures for Channel 4
2015	Casualty	Corporal Chris Clark	BBC
2015	Doctors	Steve Larkin	BBC
2015	EastEnders	Adam Wallace	BBC
2016	X Company	Major George Stirling	CBC Television
2016	New Blood	Policeman	BBC
2017	Holby City	Christian Pinnington	BBC
2018	Vikings	Aldwin	History Channel
2019	Trust Me	Simon	BBC
2019	Casualty	Ade Roger	BBC
2020	The North Water	Frederick Ward	BBC
2021	Baptiste	Toby	BBC
2023	Slow Horses	Donald	Apple TV+
2023	Professor T.	Sammy Hines	ITV (TV Network)
2024	The Day of the Jackal	SAS Staff Thomas Ellis	Sky UK
2024	Paris Has Fallen	Shaun Walker	Urban Myth Films
2025	Gandhi	Captain Edward Smith	Applause Entertainment
2025	Patience	George Evans	Eagle Eye Drama
2026	Legends	Lawrence	Tannadice Pictures

=== Theatre ===
- 2016, Stage, Borachio, Much Ado About Nothing.
- 2010, Stage, Clyde, BILLY FISKE KING OF SPEED.
- 2009, Stage, Pirsg, WHISPERING HAPPINESS.
- 2009, Stage, Macbeth, Macbeth.
- 2009, Stage, Hunter, FUCHSIA.
- 2008, Stage, Man 1, UNIDENTIFIED BAGGAGE.
- 2007, Stage, Menenius, Coriolanus.
- 2006, Stage, Him, THE WATER IS NO PLACE TO PLAY.
- 2004, Stage, Sebastian, Twelfth Night.
- 2004, Stage, Claudio, Much Ado About Nothing.
- 2004, Stage, Malcolm, Macbeth.
- 2003, Stage, Halder, Good.
