= Spain at the 2026 European Athletics Championships =

- Flag of Spain
- WA code: ESP

in Birmingham, United Kingdom 10–16 August 2026
- Competitors: 108 (53 men and 50 women)
- Medals: Gold 2 Silver 2 Bronze 4 Total 8

European Athletics Championships appearances (overview)
- 1950; 1954; 1958; 1962; 1966; 1969; 1971; 1974; 1978; 1982; 1986; 1990; 1994; 1998; 2002; 2006; 2010; 2012; 2014; 2016; 2018; 2022; 2024; 2026

Spain competed at the 2026 European Athletics Championships in Birmingham, United Kingdom from 10–16 August 2026.

== Medallists ==
Medal	Name	Event	Date
Gold	Paul McGrath	Men's half marathon race walk	15 August
Gold	María Pérez	Women's half marathon race walk	15 August
Silver	Marta García	Women's 5000 metres	11 August
Silver	Miguel Ángel López	Men's marathon race walk	15 August
Bronze	Mohamed Attaoui	Men's 800 metres	13 August
Bronze	Raquel González	Women's marathon race walk	15 August
Bronze	Ester Navarrete; Fatima Ouhaddou; Carolina Robles; Meritxell Soler	Women's marathon team	16 August
Bronze	Jaël Bestué; Andoni Calbano; Guillem Crespí; María Isabel Pérez	Mixed 4 × 100 metres relay	16 August

== Results ==
Spain entered the following athletes.

Key

- Q = Qualified for the next round
- q = Qualified for the next round as a fastest loser or, in field events, by position without achieving the qualifying target
- NR = National record
- PB = Personal best
- SB = Season best
- N/A = Round not applicable for the event

=== Men ===
Track and road events

Athlete	Event	Heat		Semifinal		Final	
Athlete	Event	Result	Rank	Result	Rank	Result	Rank
Guillem Crespí	100 m	10.74	22	Did not advance			
Jorge Hernández	100 m	10.62	17	Did not advance			
Abel Jordán	100 m	10.58	14	Did not advance			
Oriol Sánchez	200 m	28.57	24	Did not advance			
Ángel González	400 m	46.53	19	Did not advance			
Mohamed Attaoui	800 m	1:45.26	2 Q	1:43.82 SB	4 q	1:45.71	3rd place, bronze medalist(s)
David Barroso	800 m	1:45.90	4 q	1:44.96	3 Q	1:45.75	4
Pablo Sánchez-Valladares	800 m	1:47.96	5	Did not advance			
Adrián Ben	1500 m	3:42.52	8	—N/a		Did not advance	
Mariano García	1500 m	3:44.99	14	—N/a		Did not advance	
Carlos Sáez	1500 m	3:55.49	14	—N/a		Did not advance	
Abdessamad Oukhelfen	10,000 m	—N/a				28:21.89 SB	7
Jesús Ramos	10,000 m	—N/a				30:28.30	21
Jorge Blanco	Marathon	—N/a				2:14:55 SB	24
Fernando Carro	Marathon	—N/a				2:21:24 SB	44
Ibrahim Chakir	Marathon	—N/a				2:12:28 SB	20
Ilias Fifa	Marathon	—N/a				2:11:33	16
Jorge González Rivera	Marathon	—N/a				2:11:10 SB	14
Carlos Mayo	Marathon	—N/a				2:11:27 SB	15
Jorge Blanco; Fernando Carro; Ibrahim Chakir; Ilias Fifa; Jorge González Rivera; Carlos Mayo	Marathon team	—N/a				6:34:10	4
Enrique Llopis	110 m hurdles	Bye		13.47	3	Did not advance	
Asier Martínez	110 m hurdles	Bye		13.45	4	Did not advance	
Jesús David Delgado	400 m hurdles	Bye		48.37	3 q	48.66	6
Javier Lorente	400 m hurdles	50.50	18	Did not advance			
Daniel Arce	3000 m steeplechase	8:34.47	1 Q	—N/a		8:27.02	4
Alejandro Quijada	3000 m steeplechase	8:36.92	7 Q	—N/a		8:29.15	6
Diego García	Half marathon walk	—N/a				1:25:41 PB	8
Álvaro López	Half marathon walk	—N/a				1:25:25 PB	7
Paul McGrath	Half marathon walk	—N/a				1:23:23 PB	1st place, gold medalist(s)
Daniel Chamosa	Marathon walk	—N/a				3:02:32	7
Miguel Ángel López	Marathon walk	—N/a				2:56:57 NR	2nd place, silver medalist(s)
Manuel Bermúdez	Marathon walk	—N/a				3:10:38	17
José Manuel Pérez	Marathon walk	—N/a				3:03:50	9
Andoni Calbano; Alberto Calero; Guillem Crespí; Marc Escandell; Jorge Hernández; Abel Jordán; Daniel Rodríguez; Oriol Sánchez	4 × 100 m relay	DNF		—N/a		Did not advance	
David García; Ángel González; Juan José de la Rosa; Bernat Erta	4 × 400 m relay	3:01.41	4	—N/a		Did not advance	

Field events

Athlete	Event	Qualification		Final	
Athlete	Event	Distance	Position	Distance	Position
Eusebio Cáceres	Long jump	8.24	4 Q	7.92	7
Jaime Guerra	Long jump	8.12	6 q	7.73	9
Lester Lescay	Long jump	8.03	8 q	7.72	10
Diego Casas	Discus throw	62.90	8 q	65.64	6
Manu Quijera	Javelin throw	77.40	18	Did not advance	

=== Women ===
Track and road events

Athlete	Event	Heat		Semifinal		Final	
Athlete	Event	Result	Rank	Result	Rank	Result	Rank
Maria Isabel Pérez	100 m	11.11	4 q	11.31	5	Did not advance	
Jaël Bestué	200 m	Bye		22.69	2 Q	22.69	7
Alba Borrero	200 m	23.35	9 q	23.32	7	Did not advance	
Esperança Cladera	200 m	Bye		36.10	8	Did not advance	
Blanca Hervás	400 m	Bye		51.12	4	Did not advance	
Ana Prieto	400 m	51.81	8 q	51.69	7	Did not advance	
Paula Sevilla	400 m	51.78	7 q	50.21 PB	3 q	52.03	8
Rocío Arroyo	800 m	2:00.62	3 Q	1:59.32 SB	8	Did not advance	
Lorea Ibarzabal	800 m	1:59.73 SB	5	Did not advance			
Marta Mitjans	800 m	1:58.52 PB	5 q	1:59.91	6	Did not advance	
María Forero	5000 m	—N/a				15:44.25	8
Marta García	5000 m	—N/a				15:39.98 SB	2nd place, silver medalist(s)
Idaira Prieto	5000 m	—N/a				15:44.89	9
Carla Gallardo	10,000 m	—N/a				33:02.58	19
Idaira Prieto	10,000 m	—N/a				31:59.84 PB	4
Ester Navarrete	Marathon	—N/a				2:31:57 SB	18
Fatima Ouhaddou	Marathon	—N/a				2:30:37	15
Carolina Robles	Marathon	—N/a				2:28:07	8
Meritxell Soler	Marathon	—N/a				2:32:21 SB	20
Ester Navarrete; Fatima Ouhaddou; Carolina Robles; Meritxell Soler	Marathon team	—N/a				7:30:41	3rd place, bronze medalist(s)
Lerato Pagès	100 m hurdles	13.09	16	Did not advance			
Sara Gallego	400 m hurdles	Bye		55.24	5	Did not advance	
Marta Serrano	3000 m steeplechase	9:34.79	6 Q	—N/a		9:44.92	12
Antia Chamosa	Half marathon walk	—N/a				1:35:57	12
Aldara Meilán	Half marathon walk	—N/a				1:34:53	9
María Pérez	Half marathon walk	—N/a				1:30:06 WR	1st place, gold medalist(s)
Raquel González	Marathon walk	—N/a				3:20:49 PB	3rd place, bronze medalist(s)
Laura Monje Martínez	Marathon walk	—N/a				3:42:01	11
Lucia Redondo	Marathon walk	—N/a				3:28:28 PB	7
Jaël Bestué; Lucía Carrillo; Ericka Badeau Maseras; María Isabel Pérez	4 × 100 m relay	DNF		—N/a		Did not advance	
Ana Prieto; Herminia Parra; Rocío Arroyo< Blanca Hervás	4 × 400 m relay	3:26.41	2 Q	—N/a		3:24.39	4

Field events

Athlete	Event	Qualification		Final	
Athlete	Event	Distance	Position	Distance	Position
Una Stancev	High jump	1.88	16	Did not advance	
Mònica Clemente	Pole vault	4.40	15	Did not advance	
Fátima Diame	Long jump	6.65	11 q	6.80	6
Tessy Ebosele	Long jump	6.54	17	Did not advance	
Carmen Rosales	Long jump	6.38	21	Did not advance	
María Belén Toimil	Shot put	16.79	14	Did not advance	
Inés López	Discus throw	61.45 PB	6 q	56.59	12
Laura Redondo	Hammer throw	61.54	27	Did not advance	
Andrea Sales	Hammer throw	NM		Did not advance	
Yulenmis Aguilar	Javelin throw	59.85	5 q	57.06	9

Combined events – Heptathlon

Athlete	Event	100H	HJ	SP	200 m	LJ	JT	800 m	Final	Rank
Sofia Cosculluela	Result	13.42	1.65	11.88	23.94	6.39	42.94	2:21.20	5999	18
Sofia Cosculluela	Points	1062	795	653	986	972	724	807	5999	18
María Vicente	Result	13.38 SB	1.77 =SB	13.09	23.71	6.42 SB	44.02 SB	2:14.81 SB	6372 NR	8
María Vicente	Points	1068	941	733	1009	981	745	895	6372 NR	8

=== Mixed ===
Track and road events

Athlete	Event	Final	
Athlete	Event	Result	Rank
Jaël Bestué; Andoni Calbano; Guillem Crespí; María Isabel Pérez	Mixed 4 × 100 m	40.42 NR	3rd place, bronze medalist(s)
David García; Paula Sevilla; Asabu Pines; Blanca Hervás	Mixed 4 × 400 m	3:12.29	5
