= Spain at the 1958 European Athletics Championships =

- WA code: ESP
- National federation: RFEA
- Website: www.rfea.es

in Stockholm
- Competitors: 7 in 7 events (7 men)
- Medals: Gold 0 Silver 0 Bronze 0 Total 0

European Athletics Championships appearances (overview)
- 1950; 1954; 1958; 1962; 1966; 1969; 1971; 1974; 1978; 1982; 1986; 1990; 1994; 1998; 2002; 2006; 2010; 2012; 2014; 2016; 2018; 2022; 2024; 2026

Spain competed at the 1958 European Athletics Championships in Stockholm, Sweden, from 19–24 August 1954.

== Results ==
Men
Track & road events

Athlete	Event	Heats		Semifinal		Final	
Athlete	Event	Result	Rank	Result	Rank	Result	Rank
Cesáreo Marín	800 m	1:52.8	22	did not advance			
Cesáreo Marín	1500 m	3:53.4	32	—N/a		did not advance	
Tomás Barris	1500 m	3:44.5	11	—N/a		did not advance	
José Molina	5000 m	14:57.8	25	—N/a		did not advance	
Manuel Alonso	5000 m	14:18.0	18	—N/a		did not advance	
Manuel Alonso	3000 m steeplechase	8:56.2	8	—N/a		did not advance	
Antonio Amorós	10,000 m	—N/a				29:31.4	8
Miguel Navarro	Marathon	—N/a				2:38:10.0	20

Field events

Athlete	Event	Qualification		Final	
Athlete	Event	Distance	Position	Distance	Position
José María Isasa	Long jump	6.89	19	did not advance	
