= Spain at the 1962 European Athletics Championships =

- WA code: ESP
- National federation: RFEA
- Website: www.rfea.es

in Belgrade
- Competitors: 6 in 7 events (6 men)
- Medals: Gold 0 Silver 0 Bronze 0 Total 0

European Athletics Championships appearances (overview)
- 1950; 1954; 1958; 1962; 1966; 1969; 1971; 1974; 1978; 1982; 1986; 1990; 1994; 1998; 2002; 2006; 2010; 2012; 2014; 2016; 2018; 2022; 2024; 2026

Spain competed at the 1962 European Athletics Championships in Belgrade, Yugoslavia, from 12–16 September 1962.

== Results ==
Men
Track & road events

| Athlete | Event | Heats | | Semifinal | | Final | |
| Athlete | Event | Result | Rank | Result | Rank | Result | Rank |
|---|---|---|---|---|---|---|---|
| Alberto Esteban | 800 m | 1:51.9 | 8 | Did not advance | | | |
| Tomás Barris | 1500 m | 3:50.0 | 20 | —N/a | | Did not advance | |
| Mariano Haro | 10,000 m | —N/a | | | | DNF | |
| Emilio Campra | 110 m hurdles | 15.4 | 20 | Did not advance | | | |
| Miguel Navarro | Marathon | —N/a | | | | DNF | |

Field events

| Athlete | Event | Qualification | | Final | |
| Athlete | Event | Distance | Position | Distance | Position |
|---|---|---|---|---|---|
| Luis Felipe Areta | Long jump | 7.27 | 15 | Did not advance | |
| Luis Felipe Areta | Triple jump | 15.06 | 22 | Did not advance | |
