= Spain at the 1969 European Athletics Championships =

- WA code: ESP
- National federation: RFEA
- Website: www.rfea.es

in Athens
- Competitors: 6 (6 men) in 5 events
- Medals: Gold 0 Silver 0 Bronze 0 Total 0

European Athletics Championships appearances (overview)
- 1950; 1954; 1958; 1962; 1966; 1969; 1971; 1974; 1978; 1982; 1986; 1990; 1994; 1998; 2002; 2006; 2010; 2012; 2014; 2016; 2018; 2022; 2024; 2026

Spain competed at the 1969 European Athletics Championships in Athens, Greece, from 16–21 September 1969.

== Results ==
Men
Track & road events

Athlete	Event	Heats		Semifinal		Final	
Athlete	Event	Result	Rank	Result	Rank	Result	Rank
Manuel Gayoso	400 m	48.1	20 Q	47.6	15	did not advance	
Ramón Magarinos	400 m	48.0	19	did not advance			
Carlos Pérez	Marathon	—N/a				2:29:28.6	14

Field events

Athlete	Event	Qualification		Final	
Athlete	Event	Distance	Position	Distance	Position
Luis Garriga	High jump	2.11	=1 Q	2.08	10
Rafael Blanquer	Long jump	7.22	20	did not advance	

Combined events – Decathlon

Athlete	Event	100 m	LJ	SP	HJ	400 m	110H	DT	PV	JT	1500 m	Final	Rank
Rafael Cano	Result	11.2	7.17	11.22	1.89	50.00	15.8	33.42	3.90	52.32	4:40.6	6841	18
Rafael Cano	Points											6841	18
