= Spain at the 1986 European Athletics Championships =

- WA code: ESP
- National federation: RFEA
- Website: www.rfea.es

in Stuttgart
- Competitors: 34 (25 men and 9 women) in 23 events
- Medals Ranked 8th: Gold 1 Silver 0 Bronze 2 Total 3

European Athletics Championships appearances (overview)
- 1950; 1954; 1958; 1962; 1966; 1969; 1971; 1974; 1978; 1982; 1986; 1990; 1994; 1998; 2002; 2006; 2010; 2012; 2014; 2016; 2018; 2022; 2024; 2026

Spain competed at the 1986 European Athletics Championships in Stuttgart, then West Germany, from 26–31 August 1986.

For the first time, a female athlete from Spain won a medal at the European Athletics Championships.

== Medals ==
Medal	Name	Event	Date
Gold	Mari Cruz Díaz	Women's 10 km walk	26 August
Bronze	Miguel Ángel Prieto	Men's 20 km walk	27 August
Bronze	Carles Sala	Men's 110 m hurdles	30 August

== Results ==
Men
Track & road events

Athlete	Event	Heats		Semifinal		Final	
Athlete	Event	Result	Rank	Result	Rank	Result	Rank
José Javier Arqués	100 m	10.44	14 Q	10.54	16	did not advance	
Ángel Heras	400 m	46.41	19	did not advance			
Antonio Sánchez	400 m	45.78	6 Q	45.71	6 Q	45.41 NR	6
Colomán Trabado	800 m	1:49.42	22	did not advance			
José Manuel Abascal	1500 m	3:39.20	10	—N/a		did not advance	
José Luis Carreira	1500 m	3:41.33	17 Q	—N/a		3:44.09	9
José Luis González	1500 m	3:36.92	2 Q	—N/a		3:42.54	4
José Manuel Albentosa	5000 m	13:49.86	23	—N/a		did not advance	
Abel Antón	5000 m	13:32.61	16	—N/a		did not advance	
Santiago Llorente	10,000 m	—N/a				29:00.42	18
Carles Sala	110 m hurdles	13.85	8 q	13.57	=4 Q	13.50	3rd place, bronze medalist(s)
José Alonso	400 m hurdles	50.03	10 Q	49.45	5 Q	50.30	6
Jorge Bello	3000 m steeplechase	8:38.13	19	—N/a		did not advance	
Francisco Sánchez	3000 m steeplechase	8:29.20	17	—N/a		did not advance	
Juan José Prado; Antonio Sánchez; José Alonso; Ángel Heras	4 × 400 m	3:04.44	4 q	—N/a		3:04.12	5
Santiago de la Parte	Marathon	—N/a				DNF	
José Marín	20 km walk	—N/a				DQ	
Miguel Ángel Prieto	20 km walk	—N/a				1:21:36	3rd place, bronze medalist(s)
Manuel Alcalde	50 km walk	—N/a				DNF	
Jordi Llopart	50 km walk	—N/a				3:52:12	9

Field events

Athlete	Event	Qualification		Final	
Athlete	Event	Distance	Position	Distance	Position
Antonio Corgos	Long jump	7.67	14	did not advance	
Javier García	Pole vault	NM		did not advance	
Alberto Ruiz	Pole vault	NM		did not advance	
Raúl Jimeno	Hammer throw	65.62	21	did not advance	

Women
Track & road events

Athlete	Event	Heats		Semifinal		Final	
Athlete	Event	Result	Rank	Result	Rank	Result	Rank
Blanca Lacambra	400 m	54.51	17	did not advance			
Rosa María Colorado	800 m	2:03.74	14 Q	2:05.56	15	did not advance	
Mercedes Calleja	10,000 m	—N/a				33:20.68	24
Cristina Pérez	400 m hurdles	58.19	20	did not advance			
Montserrat Pujol	400 m hurdles	58.14	19	did not advance			
Esther Lahoz; Montserrat Pujol; Cristina Pérez; Blanca Lacambra	4 × 400 m	—N/a				3:32.51	6
Mercedes Calleja	Marathon	—N/a				2:40:46	11
María Luisa Irizar	Marathon	—N/a				DNF	
Mari Cruz Díaz	10 km walk	—N/a				46:09	1st place, gold medalist(s)
María Reyes Sobrino	10 km walk	—N/a				46:35	5
