= Spain at the 1971 European Athletics Championships =

- WA code: ESP
- National federation: RFEA
- Website: www.rfea.es

in Helsinki
- Competitors: 16 (13 men and 3 women) in 13 events
- Medals: Gold 0 Silver 0 Bronze 0 Total 0

European Athletics Championships appearances (overview)
- 1950; 1954; 1958; 1962; 1966; 1969; 1971; 1974; 1978; 1982; 1986; 1990; 1994; 1998; 2002; 2006; 2010; 2012; 2014; 2016; 2018; 2022; 2024

Spain competed at the 1971 European Athletics Championships in Helsinki, Finland, from 10–15 August 1971.

For the first time ever, Spain sent female athletes to the European Championships.

== Results ==
Men
Track & road events

Athlete	Event	Heats		Semifinal		Final	
Athlete	Event	Result	Rank	Result	Rank	Result	Rank
José Luis Sánchez Paraíso	100 m	10.87	22	did not advance			
José Luis Sánchez Paraíso	200 m	21.60	17	did not advance			
Luis Sarria	200 m	21.56	15 Q	21.35	9	did not advance	
Antonio Fernández	800 m	1:49.29	9 Q	1:49.92	13	did not advance	
Antonio Burgos	1500 m	3:49.3	6	—		did not advance	
Javier Álvarez	5000 m	13:44.4	2 Q	—		13:35.84	5
Mariano Haro	10,000 m	—				27:59.33 NR	5
Manuel Soriano	400 m hurdles	51.39	17	did not advance			
Francisco Suárez	400 m hurdles	51.77	21	did not advance			
Agustín Fernández	Marathon	—				2:18:26.6	8
Juan Hidalgo	Marathon	—				2:22:42.4	23
Carlos Pérez	Marathon	—				2:26:53.6	33

Field events

Athlete	Event	Qualification		Final	
Athlete	Event	Distance	Position	Distance	Position
Luis Felipe Areta	Triple jump	16.41	6 Q	15.81	10

Combined events – Decathlon

Athlete	Event	100 m	LJ	SP	HJ	400 m	110H	DT	PV	JT	1500 m	Final	Rank
Rafael Cano	Result	11.40	6.76	11.50	1.83	50.13	15.36	32.52	3.80	46.55	4:40.0	6645	22
Rafael Cano	Points											6645	22

Women
Track & road events

Athlete	Event	Heats		Semifinal		Final	
Athlete	Event	Result	Rank	Result	Rank	Result	Rank
Josefina Salgado	400 m	56.27	27	did not advance			
María-Coro Fuentes	800 m	2:12.58	23	did not advance			
María Belén Azpeitia	1500 m	4:24.0 NR	23	—		did not advance	
