= Spain at the 2006 European Athletics Championships =

- WA code: ESP
- National federation: RFEA
- Website: www.rfea.es

in Gothenburg
- Competitors: 77 (42 men and 35 women) in 39 events
- Medals Ranked 4th: Gold 3 Silver 3 Bronze 5 Total 11

European Athletics Championships appearances (overview)
- 1950; 1954; 1958; 1962; 1966; 1969; 1971; 1974; 1978; 1982; 1986; 1990; 1994; 1998; 2002; 2006; 2010; 2012; 2014; 2016; 2018; 2022; 2024; 2026

Spain competed at the 2006 European Athletics Championships in Gothenburg, Sweden, from 7-13 August 2006. It won 3 gold, 3 silver and 5 bronze medals.

== Medals ==
Medal	Name	Event	Date
Gold	Paquillo Fernández	Men's 20 km walk	8 August
Gold	Marta Domínguez	Women's 5000 m	12 August
Gold	Jesús España	Men's 5000 m	13 August
Silver	José Manuel Martínez	Men's 10,000 m	8 August
Silver	Jesús Ángel García	Men's 50 km walk	10 August
Silver	José Luis Blanco	Men's 3000 m steeplechase	11 August
Bronze	Juan Carlos de la Ossa	Men's 10,000 m	8 August
Bronze	Juan Carlos Higuero	Men's 1500 m	9 August
Bronze	Juan Carlos Higuero	Men's 5000 m	13 August
Bronze	Julio Rey	Men's marathon	13 August
Bronze	Mercedes Chilla	Women's javelin throw	13 August

== Results ==
Men
Track & road events

Athlete	Event	Round 1		Round 2		Semifinal		Final	
Athlete	Event	Result	Rank	Result	Rank	Result	Rank	Result	Rank
Orkatz Beitia	100 m	10.43	14 Q	10.53	20 Q	10.52	16	did not advance	
Iván Mocholí	100 m	10.53	27 q	10.67	30	did not advance			
Ángel David Rodríguez	100 m	10.57	30 Q	10.32	4 Q	10.33	10	did not advance	
Josué Mena	200 m	21.09	32 q	21.09	22	did not advance			
David Testa	400 m	47.29	30	—N/a		did not advance			
Juan de Dios Jurado	800 m	1:47.89	12 Q	—N/a		1:50.11	15	did not advance	
Manuel Olmedo	800 m	1:49.54	20 Q	—N/a		1:49.37	12	did not advance	
Miguel Quesada	800 m	1:47.70	8 Q	—N/a		1:47.12	1 Q	1:46.91	5
Arturo Casado	1500 m	3:47.16	14 Q	—N/a				3:40.86	4
Sergio Gallardo	1500 m	3:47.82	15 Q	—N/a				3:41.24	5
Juan Carlos Higuero	1500 m	3:40.97	3 Q	—N/a				3:39.62	3rd place, bronze medalist(s)
Juan Carlos Higuero	5000 m	13:52.66	12 Q	—N/a				13:46.48	3rd place, bronze medalist(s)
Jesús España	5000 m	13:52.33	11 Q	—N/a				13:44.70	1st place, gold medalist(s)
Pablo Villalobos	5000 m	13:51.17	10 q	—N/a				13:58.25	7
Juan Carlos de la Ossa	10,000 m	—N/a						28:13.73	3rd place, bronze medalist(s)
José Manuel Martínez	10,000 m	—N/a						28:12.06 SB	2nd place, silver medalist(s)
Ricardo Serrano	10,000 m	—N/a						28:38.40	9
Iban Maiza	110 m hurdles	13.90	24	—N/a		did not advance			
Felipe Vivancos	110 m hurdles	13.75	18	—N/a		did not advance			
José María Romera	400 m hurdles	51.73	20	—N/a				did not advance	
Eduardo Iván Rodríguez	400 m hurdles	51.24	19	—N/a				did not advance	
José Luis Blanco	3000 m steeplechase	8:30.26	9 Q	—N/a				8:26.22	2nd place, silver medalist(s)
Antonio David Jiménez	3000 m steeplechase	8:24.12	1 Q	—N/a				8:28.78	5
César Pérez	3000 m steeplechase	8:30.52	10 Q	—N/a				8:30.40	8
Iván Mocholí; Ángel David Rodríguez; Oskartz Beitia; Josué Mena	4 × 100 m relay	DQ		—N/a				did not advance	
David Melo; David Testa; Salvador Rodríguez; Santiago Ezquerro	4 × 400 m relay	3:04.71	8 q	—N/a				3:04.98	8
José Manuel Martínez	Marathon	—N/a						DNF	
Julio Rey	Marathon	—N/a						2:12:37	3rd place, bronze medalist(s)
José Ríos	Marathon	—N/a						DNF	
Kamal Ziani	Marathon	—N/a						2:21:49	30
Paquillo Fernández	20 km walk	—N/a						1:19:09	1st place, gold medalist(s)
Juan Manuel Molina	20 km walk	—N/a						DQ	
Benjamin Sánchez	20 km walk	—N/a						1:25:58	13
José Alejandro Cambil	50 km walk	—N/a						DNF	
Jesús Ángel García	50 km walk	—N/a						3:42:48 SB	2nd place, silver medalist(s)
Mikel Odriozola	50 km walk	—N/a						3:46:34	5

Field events

Athlete	Event	Qualification		Final	
Athlete	Event	Distance	Position	Distance	Position
Joan Lino	Long jump	7.83	14	did not advance	
Javier Bermejo	High jump	2.15	22	did not advance	
Manuel Martínez	Shot put	20.37	3 Q	19.68	7
Mario Pestano	Discus throw	63.08	7 q	64.84	4

Combined events – Decathlon

Athlete	Event	100 m	LJ	SP	HJ	400 m	110H	DT	PV	JT	1500 m	Final	Rank
Óscar González	Result	11.34	7.16	13.14	2.00	50.19	15.45	40.50	4.60	48.99	4:31.82	7491	18
Óscar González	Points	786	852	676	803	806	796	675	790	574	733	7491	18
Agustín Félix	Result	11.32	7.09	12.00	2.00	DQ	15.09	40.39	4.90	DNS	—	DNF	
Agustín Félix	Points	791	835	606	803	0	839	672	880	—	—	DNF	

Women
Track & road events

Athlete	Event	Heats		Semifinal		Final	
Athlete	Event	Result	Rank	Result	Rank	Result	Rank
Belén Recio	100 m	11.48 PB	17	did not advance			
Belén Recio	200 m	23.62	18 Q	24.20	14	did not advance	
Esther Desviat	800 m	2:07.11	23	did not advance			
Mayte Martínez	800 m	2:01.71	4 Q	2:00.59	8 Q	2:00.10	7
Eva Arias	1500 m	4:15.29	24	—N/a		Did not advance	
Isabel Macías	1500 m	4:20.76	28	—N/a		Did not advance	
Nuria Fernández	1500 m	4:08.91 SB	14	—N/a		Did not advance	
Marta Domínguez	5000 m	—N/a				14:56.18 CR	1st place, gold medalist(s)
Marta Domínguez	10,000 m	—N/a				30:51.69 NR	7
Yesenia Centeno	10,000 m	—N/a				DNF	
María Elena Moreno	10,000 m	—N/a				32:55.10	21
Glory Alozie	100 m hurdles	12.98	6 Q	12.89	3 Q	12.86	4
Aliuska López	100 m hurdles	13.73	33	did not advance			
Arantza Loureiro	100 m hurdles	13.56	31	did not advance			
Laia Forcadell	400 m hurdles	57.81	23	did not advance			
Cora Olivero	400 m hurdles	57.08	18	did not advance			
Zulema Fuentes-Pila	3000 m steeplechase	9:43.12 PB	11 Q	—N/a		9:40.36 NR	8
Diana Martín	3000 m steeplechase	9:47.52 PB	14	—N/a		did not advance	
Rosa Morató	3000 m steeplechase	9:52.02	18	—N/a		did not advance	
Ruth Conde; Belén Recio; Claudia Troppa; Glory Alozie	4 × 100 m relay	44.85	13	—N/a		did not advance	
María José Pueyo	Marathon	—N/a				2:47:27	27
Beatriz Pascual	20 km walk	—N/a				1:36:03	20
María José Poves	20 km walk	—N/a				1:35:03	19
María Vasco	20 km walk	—N/a				1:32:50 SB	15

Field events

Athlete	Event	Qualification		Final	
Athlete	Event	Distance	Position	Distance	Position
Niurka Montalvo	Long jump	6.55	8 q	6.50	7
Concepción Montaner	Long jump	6.49	13	did not advance	
Carlota Castrejana	Triple jump	14.08	7 Q	6.50	7
Patricia Sarrapio	Triple jump	13.57	18	did not advance	
Ruth Beitia	High jump	1.92	8 Q	1.92	9
Marta Mendía	High jump	1.90 SB	15	did not advance	
Dana Cervantes	Pole vault	4.00	25	did not advance	
Naroa Agirre	Pole vault	4.40	=7 Q	4.45	7
Mercedes Chilla	Javelin throw	59.54	8 q	61.98	3rd place, bronze medalist(s)
Dolores Pedrares	Hammer throw	61.69	27	did not advance	
Berta Castells	Hammer throw	58.93	37	did not advance	

Combined events – Heptathlon

Athlete	Event	100H	HJ	SP	200 m	LJ	JT	800 m	Final	Rank
María Peinado	Result	14.10	1.56	12.36	25.96	5.78	DNS	—	DNF	
María Peinado	Points	964	689	685	801	783	—	—	DNF	
