= Spain at the 2024 European Athletics Championships =

- Flag of Spain
- WA code: ESP
- National federation: Royal Spanish Athletics Federation

in Rome, Italy 7 June 2024 – 12 June 2022
- Medals Ranked 8th: Gold 2 Silver 3 Bronze 3 Total 8

European Athletics Championships appearances (overview)
- 1950; 1954; 1958; 1962; 1966; 1969; 1971; 1974; 1978; 1982; 1986; 1990; 1994; 1998; 2002; 2006; 2010; 2012; 2014; 2016; 2018; 2022; 2024

Spain competed at the 2024 European Athletics Championships in Rome, Italy from 7–12 June 2024.

== Medallists ==
Medal	Name	Event	Date
Gold	Ana Peleteiro-Compaoré	Women's triple jump	9 June
Gold	Jordan Díaz	Men's triple jump	10 June
Silver	Paul McGrath	Men's 20 kilometres walk	8 June
Silver	Enrique Llopis	Men's 110 metres hurdles	8 June
Silver	Mohamed Attaoui	Men's 800 metres	9 June
Bronze	Marta García	Women's 5000 metres	7 June
Bronze	Lidia Campo; Laura Luengo; Laura Méndez Esquer; Esther Navarrete; Fatima Ouhaddou; Meritxell Soler	Half marathon team	9 June
Bronze	Thierry Ndikumwenayo	Men's 10,000 metres	12 June

== Results ==
Spain entered the following athletes. Although selected, relay only racers Bernat Canet (men's 4 × 100 metres), Alba Borrero (women's 4 × 100 metres), Julio Arenas (men's 4 × 400 metres) and Laura Bou & Herminia Parra (women's 4 × 400 metres) did not get to compete.

Key

- Q = Qualified for the next round
- q = Qualified for the next round as a fastest loser or, in field events, by position without achieving the qualifying target
- CR = Championships record
- NR = National record
- PB = Personal best
- SB = Season best
- N/A = Round not applicable for the event

=== Men ===
Track and road events

Athlete	Event	Heat		Semifinal		Final	
Athlete	Event	Result	Rank	Result	Rank	Result	Rank
Guillem Crespí	100 metres	10.25	5 q	10.19 PB	7 q	10.18 PB	6
Mohamed Attaoui	800 metres	1:45.09	5 q	1:45.19	2 Q	1:45.20	2nd place, silver medalist(s)
Adrián Ben	800 metres	1:46.39	18 Q	1:45.34	4 q	1:46.54	6
Álvaro de Arriba	800 metres	1:46.03	11 Q	1:46.57	9 Q	1:45.64	4
Ignacio Fontes	1500 metres	3:39.02	7 q	3:45.80	16	Did not advance	
Mario García Romo	1500 metres	3:44.30	19	—N/a		Did not advance	
Adel Mechaal	1500 metres	3:44.19	16 Q	—N/a		3:33.58	5
Adel Mechaal	5000 metres	—N/a				13:22.77	4
Sergio Jiménez	5000 metres	—N/a				13:43.44	24
Thierry Ndikumwenayo	5000 metres	—N/a				13:23.26	5
Thierry Ndikumwenayo	10,000 metres	—N/a				28:00.96	3rd place, bronze medalist(s)
Ilias Fifa	10,000 metres	—N/a				28:14.10	11
Eduardo Menacho	10,000 metres	—N/a				28:24.93	17
Abdessamad Oukhelfen	10,000 metres	—N/a				28:10.97	8
Jesús Ramos	10,000 metres	—N/a				28:25.62	19
Jorge Blanco	Half marathon	—N/a				1:04:09	30
Ibrahim Chakir	Half marathon	—N/a				1:05:00	39
Jorge González Rivera	Half marathon	—N/a				1:01:55 PB	11
Javier Guerra	Half marathon	—N/a				1:03:17	24
Carlos Mayo	Half marathon	—N/a				1:02:12	14
Yago Rojo	Half marathon	—N/a				1:02:37	17
Jorge Blanco; Ibrahim Chakir; Jorge González Rivera; Javier Guerra; Carlos Mayo; Yago Rojo	Half marathon team	—N/a				3:06:44	4
Enrique Llopis	110 metres hurdles	Bye		13.22	2 Q	13.16 PB	2nd place, silver medalist(s)
Asier Martínez	110 metres hurdles	Bye		13.29	3 Q	13.45	4
Orlando Ortega	110 metres hurdles	13.79	12 q	13.64	13	Did not advance	
Kevin Sánchez	110 metres hurdles	13.95	18	Did not advance			
Jesús David Delgado	400 metres hurdles	49.82	10 q	49.38	13	Did not advance	
Sergio Fernández	400 metres hurdles	49.98	12 q	49.34	12	Did not advance	
Daniel Arce	3000 metres steeplechase	8:21.46	1 Q	—N/a		8:16.70	5
Fernando Carro	3000 metres steeplechase	DNF		—N/a		Did not advance	
Alejandro Quijada	3000 metres steeplechase	8:46.70	27	—N/a		Did not advance	
Alberto Amezcua	20 kilometres walk	—N/a				DNF	
Diego García Carrera	20 kilometres walk	—N/a				1:22:56	14
Paul McGrath	20 kilometres walk	—N/a				1:19:31	2nd place, silver medalist(s)
Juan Carlos Castillo; Abel Alejandro Jordán; Sergio López; Ricardo Sánchez	4 × 100 metres relay	39.21 SB	10	—N/a		Did not advance	
Iñaki Cañal; David García Zurita; Manuel Guijarro; Óscar Husillos	4 × 400 metres relay	3:01.45 SB	4 q	—N/a		3:01.44 SB	5

Field events

Athlete	Event	Qualification		Final	
Athlete	Event	Distance	Position	Distance	Position
Eusebio Cáceres	Long jump	7.98	11 q	7.54	11
Jordan Díaz	Triple jump	17.52	1 Q	18.18 CR NR	1st place, gold medalist(s)
Diego Casas	Discus throw	60.25	23	Did not advance	
Yasiel Sotero	Discus throw	60.37	22	Did not advance	
Manu Quijera	Javelin throw	75.61	21	Did not advance	

=== Women ===
Track and road events

Athlete	Event	Heat		Semifinal		Final	
Athlete	Event	Result	Rank	Result	Rank	Result	Rank
María Isabel Pérez	100 metres	11.41	13 q	11.41	21	Did not advance	
Jaël-Sakura Bestué	200 metres	Bye		22.81 SB	6 Q	22.93	7
Esperança Cladera	200 metres	23.42	12 q	23.37	20	Did not advance	
Paula Sevilla	200 metres	Bye		23.19	16	Did not advance	
Berta Segura	400 metres	51.92 PB	4 q	52.53	19	Did not advance	
Daniela García	800 metres	2:00.70	4 Q	2:00.68	11	Did not advance	
Lorea Ibarzabal	800 metres	2:01.15	12	Did not advance			
Lorena Martín	800 metres	2:02.21	16	Did not advance			
Esther Guerrero	1500 metres	4:07.01	6 Q	—N/a		4:06.03	4
Marta Pérez	1500 metres	4:12.63	16 Q	—N/a		4:06.32	6
María Forero	5000 metres	—N/a				15:19.69 PB	13
Marta García	5000 metres	—N/a				14:44.04 NR	3rd place, bronze medalist(s)
Alicia Berzosa	10,000 metres	—N/a				32:37.60 PB	12
Laura Priego	10,000 metres	—N/a				32:40.25 PB	14
Lidia Campo	Half marathon	—N/a				1:13:25	40
Laura Luengo	Half marathon	—N/a				1:10:54	12
Laura Méndez Esquer	Half marathon	—N/a				1:16:28	58
Ester Navarrete	Half marathon	—N/a				1:11:08	13
Fatima Ouhaddou	Half marathon	—N/a				1:11:14	14
Meritxell Soler	Half marathon	—N/a				1:12:16	32
Lidia Campo; Laura Luengo; Laura Méndez Esquer; Ester Navarrete; Fatima Ouhaddou; Meritxell Soler	Half marathon team	—N/a				3:33:16	3rd place, bronze medalist(s)
Daniela Fra	400 metres hurdles	55.71 PB	5 q	56.27	23	Did not advance	
Blanca Fernández de la Granja	3000 metres steeplechase	10:08.59	30	—N/a		Did not advance	
Carolina Robles	3000 metres steeplechase	9:33.79	10 Q	—N/a		9:23.75 PB	8
Irene Sánchez-Escribano	3000 metres steeplechase	9:34.80	14 Q	—N/a		9:27.97	10
Laura García-Caro	20 kilometres walk	—N/a				1:28:48	4
Raquel González	20 kilometres walk	—N/a				1:30:05	9
Cristina Montesinos	20 kilometres walk	—N/a				1:29:07	6
Jaël-Sakura Bestué ^{(only final)} Sonia Molina-Prados; Esther Navero ^{(only heat)} María Isabel Pérez; Paula Sevilla	4 × 100 metres relay	43.00	7 Q	—N/a		42.84 SB	5
Carmen Avilés; Blanca Hervás; Eva Santidrián; Berta Segura	4 × 400 metres relay	3:25.25 NR	4 q	—N/a		3:26.94	7

Field events

Athlete	Event	Qualification		Final	
Athlete	Event	Distance	Position	Distance	Position
Fatima Diame	Long jump	6.70	8 Q	6.69	8
Tessy Ebosele	Long jump	6.47	19	Did not advance	
Ana Peleteiro	Triple jump	14.21	3 Q	14.85	1st place, gold medalist(s)
María Belén Toimil	Shot put	17.76	10 q	18.43	5
Yulemnis Aguilar	Javelin throw	57.27	13	Did not advance	
