= Spain at the 1950 European Athletics Championships =

- WA code: ESP
- National federation: RFEA
- Website: www.rfea.es

in Brussels
- Competitors: 2 in 2 events (2 men)
- Medals: Gold 0 Silver 0 Bronze 0 Total 0

European Athletics Championships appearances (overview)
- 1950; 1954; 1958; 1962; 1966; 1969; 1971; 1974; 1978; 1982; 1986; 1990; 1994; 1998; 2002; 2006; 2010; 2012; 2014; 2016; 2018; 2022; 2024; 2026

Spain competed at the 1950 European Athletics Championships in Brussels, Belgium, from 23 to 27 August 1950.

It was the first time Spain sent athletes to compete in a European Athletic Championship.

== Results ==
Men
Track & road events

Athlete	Event	Final	
Athlete	Event	Result	Rank
José Coll	10,000 m	DNF	

Field events

Athlete	Event	Qualification		Final	
Athlete	Event	Distance	Position	Distance	Position
José Luis Torres	Discus throw	38.92	18	Did not advance	
