= Spain at the 1982 European Athletics Championships =

- WA code: ESP
- National federation: RFEA
- Website: www.rfea.es

in Athens
- Competitors: 21 (18 men and 3 women) in 16 events
- Medals Ranked 6th: Gold 1 Silver 2 Bronze 2 Total 5

European Athletics Championships appearances (overview)
- 1950; 1954; 1958; 1962; 1966; 1969; 1971; 1974; 1978; 1982; 1986; 1990; 1994; 1998; 2002; 2006; 2010; 2012; 2014; 2016; 2018; 2022; 2024; 2026

Spain competed at the 1982 European Athletics Championships in Athens, Greece, from 6–12 September 1982.

== Medals ==
Medal	Name	Event	Date
Gold	José Marín	Men's 20 km walk	7 September
Silver	Antonio Corgos	Men's long jump	9 September
Silver	José Marín	Men's 50 km walk	10 September
Bronze	Domingo Ramón	Men's 3000 m steeplechase	10 September
Bronze	José Manuel Abascal	Men's 1500 m	11 September

== Results ==
Men
Track & road events

Athlete	Event	Heats		Semifinal		Final	
Athlete	Event	Result	Rank	Result	Rank	Result	Rank
Ángel Heras	200 m	21.37	19	Did not advance			
Benjamín González	400 m	47.00	20	Did not advance			
José Antonio Pacheco	800 m	1:50.03	16	Did not advance			
Colomán Trabado	800 m	1:47.69	2 Q	1:49.38	14	Did not advance	
Andrés Vera	800 m	1:48.24	=8 Q	1:49.35	13	Did not advance	
José Manuel Abascal	1500 m	3:40.32	5 Q	—N/a		3:37.04	3rd place, bronze medalist(s)
Antonio Prieto	10,000 m	—N/a				29:09.29	14
Javier Moracho	110 m hurdles	14.01	15 Q	13.76	8	Did not advance	
José Alonso	400 m hurdles	50.95	14 q	51.00	15	Did not advance	
Marceliano Ruiz	400 m hurdles	51.10	15	Did not advance			
Juan José Torres	3000 m steeplechase	8:24.08	8 q	—N/a		8:34.84	11
Domingo Ramón	3000 m steeplechase	8:22.11	1 Q	—N/a		8:20.48	3rd place, bronze medalist(s)
Francisco Sánchez	3000 m steeplechase	8:33.10	17	—N/a		Did not advance	
Benjamín González; Marceliano Ruiz; Colomán Trabado; Ángel Heras	4 × 400 m	DNF		—N/a		Did not advance	
Santiago de la Parte	Marathon	—N/a				DNF	
José Marín	20 km walk	—N/a				1:23:43	1st place, gold medalist(s)
José Marín	50 km walk	—N/a				3:59:18	2nd place, silver medalist(s)
Manuel Alcalde	50 km walk	—N/a				DNF	
Jordi Llopart	50 km walk	—N/a				4:08:28	6

Field events

Athlete	Event	Qualification		Final	
Athlete	Event	Distance	Position	Distance	Position
Antonio Corgos	Long jump	8.02	2 Q	8.19	2nd place, silver medalist(s)

Women
Track & road events

Athlete	Event	Heats		Semifinal		Final	
Athlete	Event	Result	Rank	Result	Rank	Result	Rank
Mercedes Calleja	3000 m	—N/a				9:12.32	16
Montserrat Pujol	400 m hurdles	58.06	13	—N/a		Did not advance	
Iclar Martínez	Marathon	—N/a				DNF	
