= Spain at the 1974 European Athletics Championships =

- WA code: ESP
- National federation: RFEA
- Website: www.rfea.es

in Rome
- Competitors: 17 (16 men and 1 woman) in 14 events
- Medals: Gold 0 Silver 0 Bronze 0 Total 0

European Athletics Championships appearances (overview)
- 1950; 1954; 1958; 1962; 1966; 1969; 1971; 1974; 1978; 1982; 1986; 1990; 1994; 1998; 2002; 2006; 2010; 2012; 2014; 2016; 2018; 2022; 2024

Spain competed at the 1974 European Athletics Championships in Rome, Italy, from 2–8 September 1974.

== Results ==
Men
Track & road events

| Athlete | Event | Heats | | Semifinal | | Final | |
| Athlete | Event | Result | Rank | Result | Rank | Result | Rank |
|---|---|---|---|---|---|---|---|
| Javier Martínez | 100 m | 10.82 | =22 | Did not advance | | | |
| Miguel Arnau | 200 m | 21.72 | 27 | Did not advance | | | |
| Luis Sarria | 200 m | 21.54 | =20 | Did not advance | | | |
| Andrés Ballbé | 800 m | 1:48.2 | 13 | Did not advance | | | |
| Fernando Cerrada | 5000 m | 13:56.8 | =14 | —N/a | | Did not advance | |
| Mariano Haro | 10,000 m | —N/a | | | | 28:36.00 | 8 |
| Gerardo Calleja | 110 m hurdles | 14.54 | 20 | Did not advance | | | |
| Juan Lloveras | 110 m hurdles | 14.60 | 21 | Did not advance | | | |
| Antonio Campos | 3000 m steeplechase | 8:38.20 | 11 | —N/a | | Did not advance | |
| Luis Sarria; Juan Sarrasqueta; Miguel Arnau; José Luis Sánchez Paraíso | 4 × 100 m relay | 40.01 | 8 Q | —N/a | | 39.87 | 6 |
| Agustín Fernández | Marathon | DNF | | —N/a | | Did not advance | |

Field events

| Athlete | Event | Qualification | | Final | |
| Athlete | Event | Distance | Position | Distance | Position |
|---|---|---|---|---|---|
| Gustavo Marqueta | High jump | 2.11 | =15 | Did not advance | |
| Martí Perarnau | High jump | 2.08 | =25 | Did not advance | |
| Rafael Blanquer | Long jump | 7.66 | 11 q | 7.38 | 11 |

Combined events – Decathlon

| Athlete | Event | 100 m | LJ | SP | HJ | 400 m | 110H | DT | PV | JT | 1500 m | Final | Rank |
|---|---|---|---|---|---|---|---|---|---|---|---|---|---|
| Rafael Cano | Result | 11.38 | 6.79 | 11.24 | 1.89 | 49.57 | 15.49 | 33.58 | 4.20 | 54.34 | 4:43.8 | 6951 | 15 |
| Rafael Cano | Points | 778 | 764 | 560 | 705 | 835 | 791 | 535 | 673 | 653 | 657 | 6951 | 15 |

Women
Track & road events

| Athlete | Event | Heats | | Semifinal | | Final | |
| Athlete | Event | Result | Rank | Result | Rank | Result | Rank |
|---|---|---|---|---|---|---|---|
| Carmen Valero | 1500 m | 4:13.0 NR | 11 q | —N/a | | 4:11.61 NR | 7 |
| Carmen Valero | 3000 m | —N/a | | | | 9:35.4 | 15 |
