= Spain at the 2022 European Athletics Championships =

- Flag of Spain
- WA code: ESP
- National federation: Royal Spanish Athletics Federation

in Munich, Germany 15 August 2022 – 21 August 2022
- Competitors: 86 (48 men and 41 women)
- Medals Ranked 3rd: Gold 4 Silver 3 Bronze 3 Total 10

European Athletics Championships appearances (overview)
- 1950; 1954; 1958; 1962; 1966; 1969; 1971; 1974; 1978; 1982; 1986; 1990; 1994; 1998; 2002; 2006; 2010; 2012; 2014; 2016; 2018; 2022; 2024; 2026

Spain competed at the 2022 European Athletics Championships in Munich, Germany, between 15 and 21 August 2022

== Medallists ==
Medal	Name	Event	Date
Gold	Miguel Ángel López	Men's 35 kilometres walk	16 August
Gold	Asier Martínez	Men's 110 metres hurdles	17 August
Gold	Álvaro Martín	Men's 20 kilometres walk	20 August
Gold	Mariano García	Men's 800 metres	21 August
Silver	Marta Galimany; Irene Pelayo; Elena Loyo; Laura Méndez Esquer	Women's Marathon Cup	15 August
Silver	Raquel González	Women's 35 kilometres walk	16 August
Silver	Mohamed Katir	Men's 5000 metres	16 August
Bronze	Ayad Lamdassem; Jorge Blanco; Daniel Mateo; Yago Rojo; Abdelaziz Merzougui	Men's Marathon Cup	15 August
Bronze	Mario García	Men's 1500 metres	18 August
Bronze	Diego García	Men's 20 kilometres walk	20 August

== Results ==
Spain entered the following athletes.

Key

- Q = Qualified for the next round
- q = Qualified for the next round as a fastest loser or, in field events, by position without achieving the qualifying target
- NR = National record
- PB = Personal best
- SB = Season best
- N/A = Round not applicable for the event

=== Men ===
Track & road events

Athlete	Event	Heat		Semifinal		Final	
Athlete	Event	Result	Rank	Result	Rank	Result	Rank
Sergio López	100 m	DQ		did not advance			
Pol Retamal	200 m	Bye		20.38	7 q	20.63	6
Daniel Rodríguez	200 m	20.80	9 Q	20.75	15	did not advance	
Iñaki Cañal	400 m	45.83 PB	11 Q	46.10	18	did not advance	
Manuel Guijarro	400 m	46.18	18	did not advance			
Óscar Husillos	400 m	46.42	24	did not advance			
Álvaro de Arriba	800 m	1:47.94	22	did not advance			
Adrián Ben	800 m	1:47.64	11 Q	1:49.26	15	did not advance	
Mariano García	800 m	1:47.66	13 Q	1:46.52	1 Q	1:44.85 PB	1st place, gold medalist(s)
Ignacio Fontes	1500 m	3:39.00	10 Q	—N/a		3:42.30	11
Gonzalo García Garrido	1500 m	3:39.20	11 Q	—N/a		3:37.40	6
Mario García	1500 m	3:38.04	3 Q	—N/a		3:34.88	3rd place, bronze medalist(s)
Mohamed Katir	5000 m	—N/a				13:22.98 SB	2nd place, silver medalist(s)
Adel Mechaal	5000 m	—N/a				13:35.92	14
Abdessamad Oukhelfen	5000 m	—N/a				13:33.63	12
Roberto Aláiz	10000 m	—N/a				28:14.86	14
Juan Antonio Pérez	10000 m	—N/a				28:38.21	17
Enrique Llopis	110 m hurdles	Bye		13.30 PB	3 Q	14.81	7
Asier Martínez	110 m hurdles	Bye		13.25	1 Q	13.17	1st place, gold medalist(s)
Jesús David Delgado	400 m hurdles	50.61	15 Q	50.32	22	did not advance	
Aleix Porras	400 m hurdles	50.77	17	did not advance			
Daniel Arce	3000 m steeplechase	8:32.27	8 Q	—N/a		8:25.00	4
Sebastián Martos	3000 m steeplechase	8:34.19	13 q	—N/a		8:26.68	6
Víctor Ruiz	3000 m steeplechase	8:32.48	9 Q	—N/a		8:37.24	13
Alberto Calero; Jesús Gómez; Sergio López; Pablo Montalvo	4×100 m relay	11	39.14	—N/a		did not advance	
Lucas Búa; Iñaki Cañal ^{(only final)} Samuel García; Óscar Husillos; Manuel Guijarro ^{(only heat)}	4×400 m relay	3:01.27 SB	1 Q	—N/a		3:00.54 NR	4
Jorge Blanco	Marathon	—N/a				2:13:18 SB	12
Ayad Lamdassem	Marathon	—N/a				2:39:15	6
Daniel Mateo	Marathon	—N/a				2:14:34	14
Abdelaziz Merzougui	Marathon	—N/a				2:19:47 SB	43
Yago Rojo	Marathon	—N/a				2:14:41 SB	15
Ayad Lamdassem; Jorge Blanco; Daniel Mateo; Yago Rojo; Abdelaziz Merzougui	Marathon Cup	—N/a				6:38:44	3rd place, bronze medalist(s)
Alberto Amezcua	20 km walk	—N/a				1:20:00	4
Diego García	20 km walk	—N/a				1:19:45 SB	3rd place, bronze medalist(s)
Iván López	20 km walk	—N/a				1:22:55	11
Álvaro Martín	20 km walk	—N/a				1:19:11 PB	1st place, gold medalist(s)
Manuel Bermúdez	35 km walk	—N/a				2:32:31	4
Miguel Ángel López	35 km walk	—N/a				2:26:49 CR	1st place, gold medalist(s)
Marc Tur	35 km walk	—N/a				DQ	

Field events

Athlete	Event	Qualification		Final	
Athlete	Event	Distance	Position	Distance	Position
Eusebio Cáceres	Long jump	7.93	3 q	7.98	4
Héctor Santos	Long jump	7.75	10 q	7.82	7
Marcos Ruiz	Triple jump	16.76	5 q	16.78	5
Pablo Torrijos	Triple jump	16.12	11 q	NM	
Carlos Tobalina	Shot put	19.58	16	did not advance	
Javier Cienfuegos	Hammer throw	73.26	12 q	73.06	11
Manu Quijera	Javelin throw	76.67	14	did not advance	

=== Women ===
Track & road events

Athlete	Event	Heat		Semifinal		Final	
Athlete	Event	Result	Rank	Result	Rank	Result	Rank
Jaël Bestué	100 m	11.39	3 Q	11.40	12	did not advance	
Sonia Molina-Prados	100 m	11.64	21	did not advance			
María Isabel Pérez	100 m	Bye		11.35	8 Q	11.28	6
Lucía Carrillo	200 m	23.64	21	did not advance			
Paula Sevilla	200 m	Bye		23.19	10	did not advance	
Marina Martínez	800 m	2:03.45	17	did not advance			
Lucía Pinacchio	800 m	2:01.63 PB	4 q	2:06.82	16	did not advance	
Águeda Marqués	1500 m	4:07.78	18	—N/a		did not advance	
Marta Pérez	1500 m	4:07.27	14	—N/a		did not advance	
Carla Gallardo	5000 m	—N/a				15:52.64	16
Marta García Alonso	5000 m	—N/a				15:23.36 PB	12
Cristina Ruiz	5000 m	—N/a				16:07.70	17
Beatriz Álvarez	10000 m	—N/a				33:04.18	15
Maitane Melero	10000 m	—N/a				33:46.71	17
Xènia Benach	100 m hurdles	13.26	4 Q	13.18	16	did not advance	
Sara Gallego	400 m hurdles	Bye		55.16	1 Q	54.97	4
Carla García	400 m hurdles	57.03	13	did not advance			
Blanca Fernández	3000 m steeplechase	10:00.26	23	—N/a		did not advance	
Carolina Robles	3000 m steeplechase	9:45.70	12 q	—N/a		9:38.96	11
Irene Sánchez-Escribano	3000 m steeplechase	9:41.12	8 Q	—N/a		9:37.84	10
Sonia Molina-Prados; Jaël Bestué; Paula Sevilla; María Isabel Pérez	4×100 m relay	42.95	2 Q	—N/a		43.03	4
Aauri Bokesa; Sara Gallego ^{(only final)} Eva Santidrián; Berta Segura; Laura Hernández (athlete) ^{(only heat)}	4×400 m relay	3:27.76 SB	7 q	—N/a		3:29.70	8
Marta Galimany	Marathon	—N/a				2:31:14	11
Elena Loyo	Marathon	—N/a				2:34:56 SB	18
Laura Méndez Esquer	Marathon	—N/a				2:39:15 SB	32
Irene Pelayo	Marathon	—N/a				2:33:15 SB	16
Marta Galimany; Irene Pelayo; Elena Loyo; Laura Méndez Esquer	Marathon Cup	—N/a				7:39:25	2nd place, silver medalist(s)
María Pérez	20 km walk	—N/a				DQ	
Antía Chamosa	35 km walk	—N/a				3:06:37	15
Raquel González	35 km walk	—N/a				2:49:10	2nd place, silver medalist(s)
Mar Juárez	35 km walk	—N/a				2:55:27	7

Field events

Athlete	Event	Qualification		Final	
Athlete	Event	Distance	Position	Distance	Position
Irati Mitxelena	Long jump	6.36	15	did not advance	
María Belén Toimil	Shot put	17.72	10 q	17.86	10
Laura Redondo	Discus throw	67.62	13	did not advance	
Arantza Moreno	Javelin throw	56.02	16	did not advance	

Combined events – Heptathlon

Athlete	Event	100H	HJ	SP	200 m	LJ	JT	800 m	Final	Rank
Claudia Conte	Result	14.10	1.80	11.51	DNS	DNF				
Claudia Conte	Points	964	978	629	DNS	DNF				
María Vicente	Result	13.84	1.74	13.53	24.18	NM	DNS	DNF		
María Vicente	Points	1001	903	763	963	NM	DNS	DNF		
