= Spain at the 1954 European Athletics Championships =

- WA code: ESP
- National federation: RFEA
- Website: www.rfea.es

in Bern
- Competitors: 4 in 7 events (4 men)
- Medals: Gold 0 Silver 0 Bronze 0 Total 0

European Athletics Championships appearances (overview)
- 1950; 1954; 1958; 1962; 1966; 1969; 1971; 1974; 1978; 1982; 1986; 1990; 1994; 1998; 2002; 2006; 2010; 2012; 2014; 2016; 2018; 2022; 2024

Spain competed at the 1954 European Athletics Championships in Bern, Switzerland, from 25 to 29 August 1954.

== Results ==
Men
Track & road events

Athlete	Event	Heats		Semifinal		Final	
Athlete	Event	Result	Rank	Result	Rank	Result	Rank
José Fórmiga	400 m	50.3	22	did not advance			
José Fórmiga	400 m hurdles	55.3	22	did not advance			
Manuel Macías	800 m	1:56.7	29	did not advance			
Manuel Macías	1500 m	4:10.6	29	did not advance			
Antonio Amorós	5000 m	15:28.6	26	—		did not advance	
Antonio Amorós	10,000 m	—				31:50.8	21

Field events

Athlete	Event	Qualification		Final	
Athlete	Event	Distance	Position	Distance	Position
Manuel González	Long jump	6.83	18	did not advance	
