= Spain at the 1966 European Athletics Championships =

- WA code: ESP
- National federation: RFEA
- Website: www.rfea.es

in Budapest
- Competitors: 7 in 8 events (7 men)
- Medals: Gold 0 Silver 0 Bronze 0 Total 0

European Athletics Championships appearances (overview)
- 1950; 1954; 1958; 1962; 1966; 1969; 1971; 1974; 1978; 1982; 1986; 1990; 1994; 1998; 2002; 2006; 2010; 2012; 2014; 2016; 2018; 2022; 2024

Spain competed at the 1966 European Athletics Championships in Budapest, Hungary, from 30 August to 4 September 1966.

== Results ==
Men
Track & road events

Athlete	Event	Heats		Semifinal		Final	
Athlete	Event	Result	Rank	Result	Rank	Result	Rank
José Luis Sánchez Paraíso	100 m	10.9	31	did not advance			
José Luis Sánchez Paraíso	200 m	21.6	25	did not advance			
Alberto Esteban	800 m	1:48.2	4 Q	1:49.5	11 Q	1:47.4	7
Mariano Haro	5000 m	14:07.2	23	—N/a		did not advance	
Javier Álvarez	3000 m steeplechase	8:47.4	10 Q	—N/a		8:40.0	10
Carlos Pérez	Marathon	—N/a				2:22:23.8	4

Field events

Athlete	Event	Qualification		Final	
Athlete	Event	Distance	Position	Distance	Position
Luis Garriga	High jump	1.95	15	did not advance	
Ignacio Sola	Pole vault	4.60	1 Q	4.80	5
