= Spain at the 2002 European Athletics Championships =

- WA code: ESP
- National federation: RFEA
- Website: www.rfea.es

in Munich
- Competitors: 72 (44 men and 28 women) in 35 events
- Medals Ranked 2nd: Gold 6 Silver 3 Bronze 6 Total 15

European Athletics Championships appearances (overview)
- 1950; 1954; 1958; 1962; 1966; 1969; 1971; 1974; 1978; 1982; 1986; 1990; 1994; 1998; 2002; 2006; 2010; 2012; 2014; 2016; 2018; 2022; 2024

Spain competed at the 2002 European Athletics Championships in Munich, Germany, from 6–11 August 2002.

== Medals ==
Medal	Name	Event	Date
Gold	Paquillo Fernández	Men's 20 km walk	6 August
Gold	José Manuel Martínez	Men's 10,000 m	7 August
Gold	Glory Alozie	Women's 100 m hurdles	9 August
Gold	Marta Domínguez	Women's 5000 m	10 August
Gold	Antonio Jiménez	Men's 3000 m steeplechase	10 August
Gold	Alberto García	Men's 5000 m	11 August
Silver	David Canal	Men's 400 m	8 August
Silver	Mayte Martínez	Women's 800 m	8 August
Silver	Reyes Estévez	Men's 1500 m	8 August
Bronze	Juan Manuel Molina	Men's 20 km walk	6 August
Bronze	José Ríos	Men's 10,000 m	7 August
Bronze	Jesús Ángel García	Men's 50 km walk	8 August
Bronze	Luis Miguel Martín	Men's 3000 m steeplechase	10 August
Bronze	Julio Rey	Men's marathon	11 August
Bronze	Yago Lamela	Men's long jump	11 August

== Results ==
Men
Track and road events

Athlete	Event	Heats		Semifinal		Final	
Athlete	Event	Result	Rank	Result	Rank	Result	Rank
Orkatz Beitia	100 m	10.58	34	Did not advance			
Julián Martínez	200 m	21.13	25	Did not advance			
David Canal	400 m	45.75	2 Q	45.86	5Q	45.24 SB	2nd place, silver medalist(s)
Miguel Quesada	800 m	1:47.85	14 q	1:49.83	15	Did not advance	
Antonio Manuel Reina	800 m	1:47.52	7 Q	1:47.41	7	Did not advance	
Juan Carlos Higuero	1500 m	3:42.82	7 q	—N/a		3:45.81	5
José Antonio Redolat	1500 m	3:46.94	12 Q	—N/a		3:48.28	11
Reyes Estévez	1500 m	3:40.47	1 Q	—N/a		3:45.25	2nd place, silver medalist(s)
Alberto García	5000 m	—N/a				13:38.18	1st place, gold medalist(s)
Jesús España	5000 m	—N/a				13:55.80	11
Roberto García	5000 m	—N/a				13:40.85	4
Ignacio Cáceres	10,000 m	—N/a				28:25.84	12
José Manuel Martínez	10,000 m	—N/a				27:47.65	1st place, gold medalist(s)
José Ríos	10,000 m	—N/a				27:48.29	3rd place, bronze medalist(s)
Felipe Vivancos	110 m hurdles	13.84	17	Did not advance			
Jaime Juan	400 m hurdles	50.20	16 Q	50.57	13	Did not advance	
Eduardo Iván Rodríguez	400 m hurdles	50.26	18	Did not advance			
José María Romera	400 m hurdles	DQ		Did not advance			
Eliseo Martín	3000 m steeplechase	8:32.36	10 q	—N/a		8:28.63	5
Luis Miguel Martín	3000 m steeplechase	8:27.62	2 Q	—N/a		8:24.72 SB	3rd place, bronze medalist(s)
Antonio David Jiménez	3000 m steeplechase	8:27.61	1 Q	—N/a		8:24.34	1st place, gold medalist(s)
Cecilio Maestra; Ángel David Rodríguez; Oskartz Beitia; Carlos Berlanga	4 × 100 m	39.08 SB	3 q	—N/a		39.07 SB	5
César Martínez; Salvador Rodríguez; Alberto Martínez; David Canal	4 × 400 m	3:05.28	9	—N/a		Did not advance	
Xavier Caballero	Marathon	—N/a				2:15:07	11
Alejandro Gómez	Marathon	—N/a				2:13:40	6
Francisco Javier Cortés	Marathon	—N/a				2:14:14	9
Julio Rey	Marathon	—N/a				2:13:21	3rd place, bronze medalist(s)
Alberto Juzdado	Marathon	—N/a				2:13:35	5
Kamal Ziani	Marathon	—N/a				2:13:51	7
Paquillo Fernández	20 km walk	—N/a				1:18:37 CR	1st place, gold medalist(s)
Juan Manuel Molina	20 km walk	—N/a				1:20:36	3rd place, bronze medalist(s)
Santiago Pérez	50 km walk	—N/a				3:55:50	12
Mikel Odriozola	50 km walk	—N/a				DQ	
Jesús Ángel García	50 km walk	—N/a				3:44:33 SB	3rd place, bronze medalist(s)

Field events

Athlete	Event	Qualification		Final	
Athlete	Event	Distance	Position	Distance	Position
Yago Lamela	Long jump	8.03	1 Q	7.99	3rd place, bronze medalist(s)
Raúl Fernández	Long jump	7.87	6 q	7.69	9
Manuel Martínez	Shot put	20.38	3 Q	20.45	5
David Martínez	Discus throw	59.27	19	Did not advance	
Mario Pestano	Discus throw	65.27	1 Q	64.69	4

Combined events – Decathlon

Athlete	Event	100 m	LJ	SP	HJ	400 m	110H	DT	PV	JT	1500 m	Final	Rank
Óscar González	Result	DNS	—	—	—	—	—	—	—	—	—	DNS	
Óscar González	Points	—	—	—	—	—	—	—	—	—	—	DNS	

Women
Track & road events

Athlete	Event	Heats		Semifinal		Final	
Athlete	Event	Result	Rank	Result	Rank	Result	Rank
Glory Alozie	100 m	11.42	7 Q	11.32	4 Q	11.32	4
Mayte Martínez	800 m	2:02.59	6 Q	2:00.72	4 Q	1:58.86 PB	2nd place, silver medalist(s)
Nuria Fernández	1500 m	4:05.42	4 Q	—N/a		4:04.11	8
Iris Fuentes-Pila	1500 m	4:07.89	10 Q	—N/a		4:13.02	11
Natalia Rodríguez	1500 m	4:08.91	13 Q	—N/a		4:06.15	6
Marta Domínguez	5000 m	—N/a				15:14.76	1st place, gold medalist(s)
María Luisa Larraga	10,000 m	—N/a				33:14.05	25
Glory Alozie	100 m hurdles	13.03	6 Q	12.79	1 Q	12.73	1st place, gold medalist(s)
Arantza Loureiro	100 m hurdles	13.47	23	Did not advance			
Arantxa Reinares; Concepción Montaner; Glory Alozie; Carme Blay	4 × 100 m	44.32	10	—N/a		Did not advance	
María Paz Maqueda; Miriam Bravo; Mayte Martínez; Julia Alba	4 × 400 m	3:37.08	10	—N/a		Did not advance	
Beatriz Pascual	20 km walk	—N/a				1:32:38 SB	12
Eva Pérez	20 km walk	—N/a				1:31:38 SB	10
María Vasco	20 km walk	—N/a				DNF	

Field events

Athlete	Event	Qualification		Final	
Athlete	Event	Distance	Position	Distance	Position
Ruth Beitia	High jump	1.90	=1 Q	1.85	11
Marta Mendía	High jump	1.87	9	Did not advance	
Dana Cervantes	Pole vault	4.15	9	Did not advance	
Naroa Agirre	Pole vault	4.30	=7 q	4.30	10
Niurka Montalvo	Long jump	NM		Did not advance	
Concepción Montaner	Long jump	6.43	6 q	6.67	4
Carlota Castrejana	Triple jump	13.91	9 q	13.82	11
Alice Matejková	Discus throw	56.18	13	Did not advance	
Dolores Pedrares	Hammer throw	59.93	28	Did not advance	
Berta Castells	Hammer throw	57.15	35	Did not advance	

Combined events – Heptathlon

Athlete	Event	100H	HJ	SP	200 m	LJ	JT	800 m	Final	Rank
Imma Clopés	Result	14.06	1.62	12.43	24.75	5.97	35.39	2:21.47	5552	17
Imma Clopés	Points	970	759	690	910	840	579	804	5552	17
