= Spain at the 2010 European Athletics Championships =

- WA code: ESP
- National federation: RFEA
- Website: www.rfea.es

in Barcelona
- Competitors: 88 (55 men and 33 women) in 39 events
- Medals Ranked 7th: Gold 2 Silver 2 Bronze 2 Total 6

European Athletics Championships appearances (overview)
- 1950; 1954; 1958; 1962; 1966; 1969; 1971; 1974; 1978; 1982; 1986; 1990; 1994; 1998; 2002; 2006; 2010; 2012; 2014; 2016; 2018; 2022; 2024

Spain, the host country of the 2010 European Athletics Championships held in Barcelona, was represented by 88 athletes (55 men and 33 women).

== Medals ==
Medal	Name	Event	Date
Gold	Arturo Casado	Men's 1500 m	30 July
Gold	Nuria Fernández	Women's 1500 m	1 August
Silver	Jesús España	Men's 5000 m	31 July
Silver	José Manuel Martínez	Men's marathon	1 August
Bronze	Manuel Olmedo	Men's 1,500 m	30 July
Bronze	Natalia Rodríguez	Women's 1500 m	1 August

== Results ==
Men
Track & road events

Athlete	Event	Heats		Semifinal		Final	
Athlete	Event	Result	Rank	Result	Rank	Result	Rank
Ángel David Rodríguez	100 m	10.45	17 q	10.51	19	did not advance	
Marc Orozco	400 m	47.19	28 Q	46.69	24	did not advance	
Mark Ujakpor	400 m	46.85 SB	24	did not advance			
Kevin López	800 m	1:48.13	2 Q	1:48.11	5 Q	1:47.82	6
Luis Alberto Marco	800 m	1:49.96	9 Q	1:47.79	2 Q	1:48.42	7
David Bustos	800 m	1:50.01	12 Q	1:49.08	11	did not advance	
Manuel Olmedo	1500 m	3:41.47	4 Q	—		3:43.54	3rd place, bronze medalist(s)
Arturo Casado	1500 m	3:40.98	2 Q	—		3:42.74	1st place, gold medalist(s)
Reyes Estévez	1500 m	3:40.86	1 Q	—		3:43.67	4
Jesús España	5000 m	13:38.47	8 Q	—		13:33.12	2nd place, silver medalist(s)
Alemayehu Bezabeh	5000 m	13:34.44	2 Q	—		13:43.23	7
Sergio Sánchez	5000 m	13:38.48	9 Q	—		DNF	
Ayad Lamdassem	10000 m	—				28:34.89	4
Carles Castillejo	10000 m	—				28:49.69 SB	5
Manolo Penas	10000 m	—				DNF	
Felipe Vivancos	110 m hurdles	13.82	18	did not advance			
Jackson Quiñónez	110 m hurdles	13.78	16 Q	14.03	13	did not advance	
Francisco Javier López	110 m hurdles	14.15	27	did not advance			
Diego Cabello	400 m hurdles	51.48	20	did not advance			
Ignacio Sarmiento	400 m hurdles	51.82	21	did not advance			
José Luis Blanco	3000 m steeplechase	8:30.53	7 Q	—		8:19.15 SB	3rd place, bronze medalist(s)
Ángel Mullera	3000 m steeplechase	8:37.38	17	—		did not advance	
Eliseo Martín	3000 m steeplechase	8:31.71	11 q	—		8:27.49	8
Ángel David Rodríguez; Orkatz Beitia; Alain López; Rubén Pros	4 × 100 m relay	39.90	7 Q	—		DNF	
Marc Orozco; Mark Ujakpor; Santiago Ezquerro; Antonio Manuel Reina	4 × 400 m relay	3:07.38	12	—		did not advance	
José Ríos	Marathon	—				DNF	
José Manuel Martínez	Marathon	—				2:17:50	2nd place, silver medalist(s)
Rafael Iglesias	Marathon	—				2:20:14	6
Pablo Villalobos	Marathon	—				2:19:56	5
Javier Díaz	Marathon	—				2:42:41	41
Ignacio Cáceres	Marathon	—				DNF	
Miguel Ángel López	20 km walk	—				1:24:28	14
José Ignacio Díaz	20 km walk	—				1:25:36	18
Juan Manuel Molina	20 km walk	—				1:22:35	9
Jesús Ángel García	50 km walk	—				3:47:56 SB	5
Mikel Odriozola	50 km walk	—				DNF	

Field events

Athlete	Event	Qualification		Final	
Athlete	Event	Distance	Position	Distance	Position
Luis Felipe Méliz	Long jump	8.06 =SB	8 Q	7.90	11
Joan Lino Martínez	Long jump	7.63	23	did not advance	
Eusebio Cáceres	Long jump	8.27 =EL	1 Q	7.93	8
Andrés Capellán	Triple jump	16.38 SB	18	did not advance	
Javier Bermejo	High jump	2.15	24	did not advance	
Simón Siverio	High jump	2.15	27	did not advance	
Igor Bychkov	Pole vault	NM		did not advance	
Borja Vivas	Shot put	19.51	12 q	19.12	11
Manuel Martínez	Shot put	18.08	25	did not advance	
Mario Pestano	Discus throw	64.95	3 Q	64.51	6
Frank Casañas	Discus throw	63.61	8 Q	62.15	11
Javier Cienfuegos	Hammer throw	72.19 SB	18	did not advance	
Rafael Baraza	Javelin throw	73.34	19	did not advance	

=== Combined events ===
Decathlon	Event	Agustín Félix		
Decathlon	Event	Results	Points	Rank
	100 m	11.41	771	25
	Long jump	7.21	864	19
	Shot put	13.42	693	23
	High jump	1.92	731	17
	400 m	52.29 SB	712	26
	110 m hurdles	15.09 SB	839	17
	Discus throw	41.93 SB	704	15
	Pole vault	4.95 SB	895	7
	Javelin throw	57.68 SB	703	14
	1500 m	5:01.61	550	17
Final			7462 SB	21

Women
Track & road events

Athlete	Event	Heats		Semifinal		Final	
Athlete	Event	Result	Rank	Result	Rank	Result	Rank
Digna Luz Murillo	100 m	11.52	12 q	11.44	15	did not advance	
Begoña Garrido	400 m	54.65	21	—		did not advance	
Mayte Martínez	800 m	1:59.12	3	—		1:59.97	7
Irene Alfonso	800 m	2:01.61	18	—		did not advance	
Elián Périz	800 m	2:03.55	23	—		did not advance	
Natalia Rodríguez	1500 m	4:04.95 SB	3 Q	—		4:01.30 SB	3rd place, bronze medalist(s)
Nuria Fernández	1500 m	4:06.03	10 Q	—		4:00.20 PB	1st place, gold medalist(s)
Judit Pla	5000 m	—				15:35.01	12
Gema Barrachina	5000 m	—				16:00.51	16
Gema Barrachina	10,000 m	—				DNS	
Jacqueline Martín	10,000 m	—				34:11.49	12
Ana Torrijos	100 m hurdles	13.33 PB	21	did not advance			
Laia Forcadell	400 m hurdles	58.80	30	did not advance			
Marta Domínguez	3000 m steeplechase	~~9:41.93~~	~~4 Q~~	—		~~9:17.74~~	~~2~~
Rosa Morató	3000 m steeplechase	9:53.96	13	—		did not advance	
Zulema Fuentes-Pila	3000 m steeplechase	9:50.97	11 q	—		9:35.71 SB	8
Digna Luz Murillo; Ana Torrijos; Amparo Cotán; Estela García; Plácida Martínez	4 × 100 m relay	43.88	7 Q	—		43.45	6
Alessandra Aguilar	Marathon	—		—		2:35.04	7
Beatriz Ros	Marathon	—				2:40.10	17
María Vasco	20 km walk	—				DNF	
Beatriz Pascual	20 km walk	—				1:29:52	5
María José Poves	20 km walk	—				1:34:19	11

==== Field events ====
Event	Athletes	Qualification		Final	
Event	Athletes	Result	Rank	Result	Rank
Long jump	Concha Montaner	6.34	22	did not advance	
Triple jump	Patricia Sarrapio	13.21	21	did not advance	
High jump	Ruth Beitia	1.92	1 Q	1.95	6
Pole vault	Naroa Agirre	4.25	14	did not advance	
Pole vault	Anna María Pinero	4.15	18	did not advance	
Shot put	Úrsula Ruiz	16.79	15	did not advance	
Shot put	Irache Quintanal	16.01	17	did not advance	
Discus throw	Irache Quintanal	50.81	21	did not advance	
Hammer throw	Berta Castells	66.61	11 q	68.20	9
Javelin throw	Mercedes Chilla	56.78	10	61.40	6

==== Combined events ====
Heptathlon	Event	Bárbara Hernando		
Heptathlon	Event	Results	Points	Rank
	100 m hurdles	13.69 PB	1023	9
	High jump	1.68 PB	830	23
	Shot put	12.05 PB	664	23
	200 m	25.98 =SB	799	22
	Long jump	5.67	750	20
	Javelin throw	35.84	588	21
	800 m	DNS		
	Final		DNF	

== Notes ==
1. Marta Domínguez won the silver medal, but all her competitive results from 5 August 2009 until 8 July 2013 were disqualified for doping offences.
