= Spain at the 2012 European Athletics Championships =

- WA code: ESP
- National federation: RFEA
- Website: www.rfea.es

in Helsinki
- Competitors: 68 (40 men and 28 women)
- Medals Ranked 10th: Gold 1 Silver 1 Bronze 3 Total 5

European Athletics Championships appearances (overview)
- 1950; 1954; 1958; 1962; 1966; 1969; 1971; 1974; 1978; 1982; 1986; 1990; 1994; 1998; 2002; 2006; 2010; 2012; 2014; 2016; 2018; 2022; 2024

Spain competed at the 2012 European Athletics Championships in Helsinki, Finland, from 27 Juneto 1 July.

== Medals ==
Medal	Name	Event	Date
Gold	Ruth Beitia	Women's high jump	28 June
Silver	Luis Felipe Méliz	Men's long jump	1 July
Bronze	Víctor García	Men's 3000 m steeplechase	29 June
Bronze	David Bustos	Men's 1500 m	1 July
Bronze	Nuria Fernández	Women's 1500 m	1 July

== Results ==
Men
Track & road events

Athlete	Event	Heats		Semifinal		Final	
Athlete	Event	Result	Rank	Result	Rank	Result	Rank
Ángel David Rodríguez	100 m	DNS		Did not advance			
Bruno Hortelano	200 m	21.08	19 Q	21.35	18	Did not advance	
Roberto Briones	400 m	47.20	23 q	47.56	22	Did not advance	
Samuel García	400 m	47.20	23 q	47.56	22	Did not advance	
Mark Ujakpor	400 m	47.07	22 Q	47.27	21	Did not advance	
Kevin López	800 m	1:48.46	24 Q	1:47.30	10	Did not advance	
Luis Alberto Marco	800 m	1:47.42	8 Q	1:49.06	19	Did not advance	
Antonio Manuel Reina	800 m	1:47.61	11 Q	1:46.49	1 Q	1:48.98	4
David Bustos	1500 m	3:46.12	13 Q	—		3:46.45	3rd place, bronze medalist(s)
Manuel Olmedo	1500 m	DNF		—		Did not advance	
Álvaro Rodríguez	1500 m	3:46.33	15	—		Did not advance	
Francisco Javier Alves	5000 m	—				13:42.46	12
Jesús España	5000 m	—				13:55.98	20
Manuel Ángel Penas	5000 m	—				13:41.40	10
Manuel Ángel Penas	10,000 m	—				29:02.01	10
Carles Castillejo	10,000 m	—				28:24.51	5
Ayad Lamdassem	10,000 m	—				28:26.46	6
Francisco Javier López	110 m hurdles	14.03	27	Did not advance			
Jackson Quiñónez	110 m hurdles	13.97	24	Did not advance			
Diego Cabello	400 m hurdles	50.89	17 Q	50.52	16	Did not advance	
Javier Sagredo	400 m hurdles	51.37	24 q	51.66	22	Did not advance	
Juan Enrique Vallés	400 m hurdles	52.43	33	Did not advance			
Víctor García	3000 m steeplechase	8:29.44	3 Q	—		8:35.87	3rd place, bronze medalist(s)
Antonio David Jiménez	3000 m steeplechase	8:35.44	12 q	—		8:53.30	13
Abdelaziz Merzougui	3000 m steeplechase	8:29.51	5 q	—		8:38.58	4
Eduard Viles; Bruno Hortelano; Alberto Gavaldá; Diego Alonso	4 × 100 m relay	39.81	9	—		Did not advance	
Roberto Briones; David Testa; Mark Ujakpor; Samuel García	4 × 400 m relay	3:09.11	10	—		Did not advance	

Field events

Athlete	Event	Qualification		Final	
Athlete	Event	Distance	Position	Distance	Position
Eusebio Cáceres	Long jump	7.92	11 q	8.06 SB	5
Luis Felipe Méliz	Long jump	8.06 SB	3 Q	8.21 SB	2nd place, silver medalist(s)
Lisvany Pérez	Triple jump	16.24	16	Did not advance	
Vicente Docavo	Triple jump	14.29	26	Did not advance	
Miguel Ángel Sancho	High jump	2.19	12	Did not advance	
Simón Siverio	High jump	2.15	26	Did not advance	
Igor Bychkov	Pole vault	5.50	10 q	NM	
Dídac Salas	Pole vault	5.30	14	Did not advance	
Borja Vivas	Shot put	19.67	7 q	19.81	7
Mario Pestano	Discus throw	66.27 SB	1 Q	63.87	4
Frank Casañas	Discus throw	64.50	6 q	63.60	5
Mario Pestano	Hammer throw	70.91	22	Did not advance	

Women
Track & road events

Athlete	Event	Heats		Semifinal		Final	
Athlete	Event	Result	Rank	Result	Rank	Result	Rank
Aauri Bokesa	400 m	53.23	15 q	52.47 PB	10	Did not advance	
Iris Fuentes-Pila	1500 m	4:15.95	17	—		Did not advance	
Isabel Macías	1500 m	4:10.06	3 Q	—		4:11.12	8
Nuria Fernández	1500 m	4:11.77	8 Q	—		4:08.80	3rd place, bronze medalist(s)
Judith Plá	5000 m	—				15:27.62 SB	10
Lidia Rodríguez	5000 m	—				16:07.73	18
Lidia Rodríguez	10,000 m	—				33:09.53	11
Marta Silvestre	10,000 m	—				34:21.24	13
Zulema Fuentes-Pila	3000 m steeplechase	9:54.16	13 q	—		10:05.06	14
Diana Martín	3000 m steeplechase	9:40.02	6 Q	—		9:45.36	7
Marta Domínguez	3000 m steeplechase	DNF		—		Did not advance	
Plácida Martínez; Belén Recio; Alazne Furundarena; Sara María Santiago	4 × 100 m relay	45.47	14	—		Did not advance	
Aauri Bokesa; Natalia Romero; Begoña Garrido; Andrea Díez	4 × 400 m relay	3:38.00	13	—		Did not advance	

Field events

Athlete	Event	Qualification		Final	
Athlete	Event	Distance	Position	Distance	Position
María del Mar Jover	Long jump	6.27	18	Did not advance	
Concepción Montaner	Long jump	6.39	12 q	6.26	10
Patricia Sarrapio	Triple jump	13.90 SB	16	Did not advance	
Ruth Beitia	High jump	1.90	=1 q	1.97 =SB	1st place, gold medalist(s)
Anna María Pinero	Pole vault	4.15	23	Did not advance	
Naroa Agirre	Pole vault	4.05	25	Did not advance	
Úrsula Ruiz	Shot put	16.39	13	Did not advance	
Sabina Asenjo	Discus throw	53.92	18	Did not advance	
Noraida Bicet	Javelin throw	53.80	16	Did not advance	
Laura Redondo	Hammer throw	NM		Did not advance	
Berta Castells	Hammer throw	68.52 SB	5 q	67.42	9
