= Spain at the 1994 European Athletics Championships =

- WA code: ESP
- National federation: RFEA
- Website: www.rfea.es

in Helsinki
- Competitors: 58 (41 men and 17 women) in 26 events
- Medals Ranked 6th: Gold 3 Silver 2 Bronze 4 Total 9

European Athletics Championships appearances (overview)
- 1950; 1954; 1958; 1962; 1966; 1969; 1971; 1974; 1978; 1982; 1986; 1990; 1994; 1998; 2002; 2006; 2010; 2012; 2014; 2016; 2018; 2022; 2024

Spain competed at the 1994 European Athletics Championships in Helsinki, Finland, from 7–14 August 1994.

== Medals ==
Medal	Name	Event	Date
Gold	Abel Antón	Men's 10,000 m	7 August
Gold	Fermín Cacho	Men's 1500 m	9 August
Gold	Martín Fiz	Men's marathon	14 August
Silver	Isaac Viciosa	Men's 1500 m	9 August
Silver	Diego García	Men's marathon	14 August
Bronze	Valentí Massana	Men's 20 km walk	8 August
Bronze	Tomás de Teresa	Men's 800 m	14 August
Bronze	Abel Antón	Men's 5000 m	14 August
Bronze	Alberto Juzdado	Men's marathon	14 August

== Results ==
Men
Track & road events

Athlete	Event	Heats		Semifinal		Final	
Athlete	Event	Result	Rank	Result	Rank	Result	Rank
Pedro Pablo Nolet	100 m	10.50	17 q	10.54	=12	did not advance	
Frutos Feo	100 m	10.74	38	did not advance			
Frutos Feo	200 m	21.48	26	did not advance			
José Manuel Cerezo	800 m	1:48.92	19 Q	1:47.24	10 Q	1:47.58	7
Tomás de Teresa	800 m	1:47.94	14 Q	1:45.89	4 Q	1:46.57	3rd place, bronze medalist(s)
Andrés Manuel Díaz	800 m	1:48.67	18	did not advance			
Fermín Cacho	1500 m	3:37.18	1 Q	—N/a		3:35.27	1st place, gold medalist(s)
Manuel Pancorbo	1500 m	3:40.06	12 Q	—N/a		3:38.16	6
Isaac Viciosa	1500 m	3:39.72	9 Q	—N/a		3:36.01	2nd place, silver medalist(s)
José Carlos Adán	5000 m	13:40.39	15 Q	—N/a		13:39.16	6
Anacleto Jiménez	5000 m	13:40.25	14 Q	—N/a		13:41.60	8
Abel Antón	5000 m	13:34.62	10 q	—N/a		13:38.04	3rd place, bronze medalist(s)
Abel Antón	10,000 m	—N/a				28:06.03	1st place, gold medalist(s)
Carlos de la Torre	10,000 m	—N/a				28:10.77	8
Antonio Serrano	10,000 m	—N/a				28:31.75	16
Iñigo Monreal	400 m hurdles	51.51	34	did not advance			
Óscar Pitillas	400 m hurdles	50.50	26	did not advance			
Salvador Vila	400 m hurdles	51.18	33	did not advance			
Jon Azkueta	3000 m steeplechase	DNF		—N/a		did not advance	
Antonio Peula	3000 m steeplechase	8:44.21	19	—N/a		did not advance	
Elisardo de la Torre	3000 m steeplechase	8:38.16	18	—N/a		did not advance	
Luis Turón; Frutos Feo; Juan Jesús Trapero; Pedro Pablo Nolet	4 × 100 m	40.01	10	—N/a		did not advance	
Martín Fiz	Marathon	—N/a				2:10:31	1st place, gold medalist(s)
José Esteban Montiel	Marathon	—N/a				DNF	
Diego García	Marathon	—N/a				2:10:46	2nd place, silver medalist(s)
Rodrigo Gavela	Marathon	—N/a				DNF	
Alberto Juzdado	Marathon	—N/a				2:11:18	3rd place, bronze medalist(s)
Antoni Peña	Marathon	—N/a				2:17:19	32
Valentí Massana	20 km walk	—N/a				1:20:33	3rd place, bronze medalist(s)
Daniel Plaza	20 km walk	—N/a				DQ	
Fernando Vázquez	20 km walk	—N/a				1:23:22	11
Andrés Marín	50 km walk	—N/a				3:52:14	12
Basilio Labrador	50 km walk	—N/a				3:58:58	17
Jesús Ángel García	50 km walk	—N/a				3:45:25	4

Field events

Athlete	Event	Qualification		Final	
Athlete	Event	Distance	Position	Distance	Position
Ángel Hernández	Long jump	7.73	19	did not advance	
Gustavo Becker	High jump	2.10	=25	did not advance	
Javier García	Pole vault	5.40	=19	did not advance	
Daniel Martí	Pole vault	5.40	=19	did not advance	
Manuel Martínez	Shot put	18.53	14	did not advance	

Combined events – Decathlon

Athlete	Event	100 m	LJ	SP	HJ	400 m	110H	DT	PV	JT	1500 m	Final	Rank
Álvaro Burrell	Result	10.98	NM	DNS	—	—	—	—	—	—	—	DNF	
Álvaro Burrell	Points	865	0	—	—	—	—	—	—	—	—	DNF	
Antonio Peñalver	Result	11.21	7.35	15.82	1.93	DNS	—	—	—	—	—	DNF	
Antonio Peñalver	Points	814	898	840	740	—	—	—	—	—	—	DNF	
Francisco Javier Benet	Result	11.36	7.07	12.78	1.87	49.34	14.40	43.80	4.80	63.28	4:31.34	7836	12
Francisco Javier Benet	Points	782	830	654	687	845	924	742	849	787	736	7836	12

Women
Track & road events

Athlete	Event	Heats		Semifinal		Final	
Athlete	Event	Result	Rank	Result	Rank	Result	Rank
Sandra Myers	400 m	51.93	5 Q	DNF		did not advance	
Maite Zúñiga	1500 m	4:09.53	8 q	—N/a		4:20.83	8
Estela Estévez	3000 m	9:03.02	23	—N/a		did not advance	
Julia Vaquero	3000 m	9:11.76	26	—N/a		did not advance	
Carmen Fuentes	10,000 m	—N/a				33:05.55	18
María José Mardomingo	100 m hurdles	13.24	15 q	13.35	14	did not advance	
Yolanda Díaz; Cristina Castro; María del Carmen García; Carme Blay	4 × 100 m	45.11	11	—N/a		did not advance	
Ana Isabel Alonso	Marathon	—N/a				2:37:36	14
Josefa Cruz	Marathon	—N/a				DNF	
María Luisa Muñoz	Marathon	—N/a				DNF	
Rocío Ríos	Marathon	—N/a				DNF	
Emilia Cano	10 km walk	—N/a				45:14	13
Encarna Granados	10 km walk	—N/a				45:43	15

Field events

Athlete	Event	Qualification		Final	
Athlete	Event	Distance	Position	Distance	Position
Concepción Paredes	Triple jump	13.78	9 q	13.68	9
