= Spain at the 1990 European Athletics Championships =

- WA code: ESP
- National federation: RFEA
- Website: www.rfea.es

in Split
- Competitors: 61 (40 men and 21 women) in 32 events
- Medals Ranked 11th: Gold 0 Silver 2 Bronze 0 Total 2

European Athletics Championships appearances (overview)
- 1950; 1954; 1958; 1962; 1966; 1969; 1971; 1974; 1978; 1982; 1986; 1990; 1994; 1998; 2002; 2006; 2010; 2012; 2014; 2016; 2018; 2022; 2024

Spain competed at the 1990 European Athletics Championships in Split, then Yugoslavia, from 26 August to 2 September 1990.

== Medals ==
Medal	Name	Event	Date
Silver	Daniel Plaza	Men's 20 km walk	28 August
Silver	Ángel Hernández	Men's long jump	30 August

== Results ==
Men
Track & road events

Athlete	Event	Heats		Semifinal		Final	
Athlete	Event	Result	Rank	Result	Rank	Result	Rank
Florencio Gascón	100 m	10.56	18	did not advance			
Luis Rodríguez	100 m	10.49	14 q	10.56	14	did not advance	
Enrique Talavera	100 m	10.48	12 q	10.42	10	did not advance	
Enrique Talavera	200 m	21.15	16 q	21.31	15	did not advance	
Gaietà Cornet	400 m	46.07	6 Q	45.00	1 Q	45.30	4
Antonio Sánchez	400 m	46.99	30	did not advance			
José Luis Palacios	400 m	46.90	29	did not advance			
José Arconada	800 m	1:50.24	17	did not advance			
Tomás de Teresa	800 m	1:47.83	5 q	1:48.63	14	did not advance	
Luis Javier González	800 m	1:48.42	9 Q	1:50.79	16	did not advance	
Fermín Cacho	1500 m	3:39.22	3 Q	—N/a		3:42.21	11
Teófilo Benito	1500 m	3:40.99	15	—N/a		did not advance	
José Luis González	1500 m	3:38.75	1 Q	—N/a		3:39.15	6
Martín Fiz	5000 m	DNF		—N/a		did not advance	
Abel Antón	5000 m	13:29.81	9 q	—N/a		13:31.27	11
Antonio Serrano	5000 m	13:42.03	16	—N/a		did not advance	
José Manuel Albentosa	10,000 m	—N/a				28:11.00	6
Alejandro Gómez	10,000 m	—N/a				28:16.06	10
Antonio Prieto	10,000 m	—N/a				28:05.35	4
Carles Sala	110 m hurdles	13.78	6 Q	13.61	9	did not advance	
José Alonso	400 m hurdles	50.36	5 Q	49.92	8 Q	49.77	7
Santiago Fraga	400 m hurdles	52.00	25	did not advance			
Benito Nogales	3000 m steeplechase	8:23.52	10	—N/a		8:26.11	10
Antonio Peula	3000 m steeplechase	8:23.47	9	—N/a		8:24.47	9
Florencio Gascón; Enrique Talavera; José Javier Arqués; Luis Rodríguez	4 × 100 m	39.89	6 q	—N/a		39.10	6
Manuel Moreno; Antonio Sánchez; Moisés Fernández; José Luis Palacios; Gaietà Cornet	4 × 400 m	3:05.90	8 q	—N/a		3:02.74	6
Vicente Antón	Marathon	—N/a				DNF	
José Esteban Montiel	Marathon	—N/a				2:17:51	5
Juan Francisco Romera	Marathon	—N/a				2:19:58	10
Valentí Massana	20 km walk	—N/a				1:23:53	5
Daniel Plaza	20 km walk	—N/a				1:22:22	2nd place, silver medalist(s)
Miguel Ángel Prieto	20 km walk	—N/a				1:28:32	13
José Marín	50 km walk	—N/a				4:02:53	5
Basilio Labrador	50 km walk	—N/a				4:02:05	4
Jordi Llopart	50 km walk	—N/a				DNF	

Field events

Athlete	Event	Qualification		Final	
Athlete	Event	Distance	Position	Distance	Position
Ángel Hernández	Long jump	8.00	6 Q	8.15	2nd place, silver medalist(s)
Arturo Ortiz	High jump	2.28	=1 Q	2.28	8
Javier García	Pole vault	5.30	=5 Q	5.70	5

Combined events – Decathlon

Athlete	Event	100 m	LJ	SP	HJ	400 m	110H	DT	PV	JT	1500 m	Final	Rank
Álvaro Burrell	Result	11.09	6.68	13.36	1.95	48.06	14.93	42.36	4.10	47.08	4:29.55	7443	18
Álvaro Burrell	Points	841	739	689	758	906	858	713	645	546	748	7443	18
Antonio Peñalver	Result	11.24	7.55	16.01	2.01	50.27	14.63	47.84	4.70	57.48	4:28.86	8214	6
Antonio Peñalver	Points	808	947	852	813	802	895	826	819	700	752	8214	6

Women
Track & road events

Athlete	Event	Heats		Semifinal		Final	
Athlete	Event	Result	Rank	Result	Rank	Result	Rank
Cristina Castro	100 m	11.60	13 q	11.61	12	did not advance	
Sandra Myers	200 m	23.50	12 Q	22.69	6 Q	22.38 NR	4
Blanca Lacambra	400 m	54.61	24	did not advance			
Julia Merino	400 m	53.74	20	did not advance			
Maite Zúñiga	800 m	2:01.13	7 Q	2:01.81	13	did not advance	
Montserrat Pujol	1500 m	4:15.72	14	—N/a		did not advance	
Estela Estévez	3000 m	9:05.25	17	—N/a		did not advance	
Ana Barrenechea	100 m hurdles	13.85	19	did not advance			
María José Mardomingo	100 m hurdles	13.41	15 q	13.40	15	did not advance	
Cristina Pérez	400 m hurdles	55.82	4 Q	55.87	7 Q	56.09	7
Miriam Alonso	400 m hurdles	58.35	23	did not advance			
Yolanda Tello	400 m hurdles	DQ		did not advance			
Yolanda Díaz; Cristina Castro; María del Carmen García; Sandra Myers	4 × 100 m	—N/a				44.86	6
Esther Lahoz; Gemma Bergasa; Julia Merino; Blanca Lacambra	4 × 400 m	3:31.76	9	—N/a		did not advance	
Marina Prat	Marathon	—N/a				2:47:41	16
Emilia Cano	10 km walk	—N/a				46:43	11
María Reyes Sobrino	10 km walk	—N/a				45:42	7
Teresa Palacio	10 km walk	—N/a				47:30	14

Field events

Athlete	Event	Qualification		Final	
Athlete	Event	Distance	Position	Distance	Position
Margarita Ramos	Shot put	—N/a		16.23	11
