= Spain at the 1998 European Athletics Championships =

- WA code: ESP
- National federation: RFEA
- Website: www.rfea.es

in Budapest
- Competitors: 68 (42 men and 26 women) in 31 events
- Medals Ranked 9th: Gold 2 Silver 1 Bronze 4 Total 7

European Athletics Championships appearances (overview)
- 1950; 1954; 1958; 1962; 1966; 1969; 1971; 1974; 1978; 1982; 1986; 1990; 1994; 1998; 2002; 2006; 2010; 2012; 2014; 2016; 2018; 2022; 2024

Spain competed at the 1998 European Athletics Championships in Budapest, Hungary, from 18–23 August 1998.

== Medals ==
Medal	Name	Event	Date
Gold	Reyes Estevez	Men's 1500 m	20 August
Gold	Isaac Viciosa	Men's 5000 m	22 August
Silver	Manuel Pancorbo	Men's 5000 m	22 August
Bronze	Paquillo Fernández	Men's 20 km walk	18 August
Bronze	Fermín Cacho	Men's 1500 m	20 August
Bronze	Marta Domínguez	Women's 5000 m	23 August
Bronze	Juan Vicente Trull, Antonio Andrés, Andrés Martinez, David Canal	Men's 4 × 400 m	23 August

== Results ==
Men
Track & road events

Athlete	Event	Heats		Semifinal		Final	
Athlete	Event	Result	Rank	Result	Rank	Result	Rank
Carlos Berlanga	100 m	10.59	31	Did not advance			
Diego Santos	100 m	10.49	20 q	10.41	12	Did not advance	
Frutos Feo	100 m	10.81	41	Did not advance			
Javier Navarro	200 m	21.22	23	Did not advance			
Antonio Andrés	400 m	46.27 PB	11 q	46.59	16	Did not advance	
David Canal	400 m	45.20 PB	1 Q	45.29	4 Q	45.93	7
José Antonio Redolat	800 m	1:49.86	32	Did not advance			
Roberto Parra	800 m	1:46.91 PB	5 q	1:49.26	15	Did not advance	
Fermín Cacho	1500 m	3:38.52	1 Q	—N/a		3:42.13	3rd place, bronze medalist(s)
Andrés Díaz	1500 m	3:38.65	2 Q	—N/a		3:46.99	11
Reyes Estévez	1500 m	3:41.53	9 Q	—N/a		3:41.31	1st place, gold medalist(s)
Alberto García	5000 m	—N/a				13:45.58	10
Manuel Pancorbo	5000 m	—N/a				13:38.03	2nd place, silver medalist(s)
Isaac Viciosa	5000 m	—N/a				13:37.46	1st place, gold medalist(s)
Enrique Molina	10,000 m	—N/a				28:19.54	6
Julio Rey	10,000 m	—N/a				DNF	
Bruno Toledo	10,000 m	—N/a				28:15.17	5
Hipólito Montesinos	110 m hurdles	14.30	25	Did not advance			
Iñigo Monreal	400 m hurdles	50.94	23	Did not advance			
Eliseo Martín	3000 m steeplechase	8:27.35	6 q	—N/a		8:26.60	7
Luis Miguel Martín	3000 m steeplechase	8:27.31	5 Q	—N/a		8:20.54 PB	4
Ramiro Morán	3000 m steeplechase	8:27.46 SB	7 Q	—N/a		8:24.06 PB	6
Javier Navarro; Frutos Feo; Diego Santos; Carlos Berlanga	4 × 100 m	DNF		—N/a		Did not advance	
Juan Vicente Trull; Antonio Andrés; Andrés Martinez; David Canal	4 × 400 m	3:05.63 SB	6 q	—N/a		3:02.47 NR	3rd place, bronze medalist(s)
José Manuel García	Marathon	—N/a				DNF	
Alejandro Gómez	Marathon	—N/a				2:13:23	5
Diego García	Marathon	—N/a				DNF	
Julio Rey	Marathon	—N/a				2:13:17	4
Antonio Serrano	Marathon	—N/a				2:14:58	12
Antoni Peña	Marathon	—N/a				2:13:53	6
Valentí Massana	20 km walk	—N/a				1:23:36	9
Daniel Plaza	20 km walk	—N/a				DQ	
Paquillo Fernández	20 km walk	—N/a				1:21:39	3rd place, bronze medalist(s)
Santiago Pérez	50 km walk	—N/a				3:48:17	6
Mikel Odriozola	50 km walk	—N/a				3:47:24 PB	4
Jesús Ángel García	50 km walk	—N/a				DQ	

Field events

Athlete	Event	Qualification		Final	
Athlete	Event	Distance	Position	Distance	Position
Yago Lamela	Long jump	7.77	12 q	7.93	8
Raúl Fernández	Long jump	7.56	30	Did not advance	
Ignacio Pérez	High jump	2.15	=18	Did not advance	
Manuel Martínez	Shot put	19.54	8 q	20.02 SB	7

Combined events – Decathlon

Athlete	Event	100 m	LJ	SP	HJ	400 m	110H	DT	PV	JT	1500 m	Final	Rank
Jaime Peñas	Result	11.18	7.05	15.31	2.06	50.41	15.12	45.17	4.60	59.48	DNF	7236	20
Jaime Peñas	Points	821	826	809	859	796	835	770	790	730	0	7236	20
Antonio Peñalver	Result	11.18	7.02	16.18	NM	DNS	—	—	—	—	—	DNF	
Antonio Peñalver	Points	821	818	962	0	—	—	—	—	—	—	DNF	
Francisco Javier Benet	Result	11.17	7.12	13.54	1.91	48.62	14.56	39.86	DNS	—	—	DNF	
Francisco Javier Benet	Points	823	842	700	723	879	903	662	—	—	—	DNF	

Women
Track & road events

Athlete	Event	Heats		Semifinal		Final	
Athlete	Event	Result	Rank	Result	Rank	Result	Rank
Pilar Barreiro	800 m	2:01.60	14	Did not advance			
Nuria Fernández	800 m	2:04.89	31	Did not advance			
Ana Menéndez	800 m	2:01.63	15	Did not advance			
Maite Zúñiga	1500 m	4:08.93	8 q	—N/a		4:15.10	8
Marta Domínguez	5000 m	—N/a				15:10.54	3rd place, bronze medalist(s)
Teresa Recio	5000 m	—N/a				15:40.54	8
Estíbaliz Urrutia	5000 m	—N/a				16:02.81	13
María Abel	10,000 m	—N/a				DNF	
María Luisa Larraga	10,000 m	—N/a				32:37.10	9
Julia Vaquero	10,000 m	—N/a				31:46.47	6
María José Mardomingo	100 m hurdles	13.66	18	—N/a		Did not advance	
Elena Córcoles; Arantxa Iglesias; Susana Martín; Carme Blay	4 × 100 m	44.64	9	—N/a		Did not advance	
Ana Isabel Alonso	Marathon	—N/a				DNF	
María Luisa Muñoz	Marathon	—N/a				2:35:53	20
Rocío Ríos	Marathon	—N/a				2:29:53	6
Celia Marcen	10 km walk	—N/a				45:34	16
Encarna Granados	10 km walk	—N/a				DNF	
María Vasco	10 km walk	—N/a				43:02 NR	5

Field events

Athlete	Event	Qualification		Final	
Athlete	Event	Distance	Position	Distance	Position
Dana Cervantes	Pole vault	4.15 NR	=1 Q	4.05	11
Mar Sánchez	Pole vault	4.00	=11 q	4.05	10
Margarita Ramos	Shot put	16.41	18	Did not advance	
Dolores Pedrares	Hammer throw	54.34	23	Did not advance	

Combined events – Heptathlon

Athlete	Event	100H	HJ	SP	200 m	LJ	JT	800 m	Final	Rank
Imma Clopés	Result	14.31	1.71	12.88	25.65	5.82	42.45	2:22.75	5645	14
Imma Clopés	Points	935	867	719	828	795	714	787	5645	14
