= Spain at the 1978 European Athletics Championships =

- WA code: ESP
- National federation: RFEA
- Website: www.rfea.es

in Prague
- Competitors: 16 (13 men and 3 women) in 12 events
- Medals Ranked 10th: Gold 1 Silver 0 Bronze 0 Total 1

European Athletics Championships appearances (overview)
- 1950; 1954; 1958; 1962; 1966; 1969; 1971; 1974; 1978; 1982; 1986; 1990; 1994; 1998; 2002; 2006; 2010; 2012; 2014; 2016; 2018; 2022; 2024

Spain competed at the 1978 European Athletics Championships in Prague, then Czechoslovakia, from 29 August to 3 September 1978.

For the first time, a Spanish athlete won a medal in the European Athletics Championships.

== Medals ==
Medal	Name	Event	Date
Gold	Jordi Llopart	Men's 50 km walk	2 September

== Results ==
Men
Track & road events

Athlete	Event	Heats		Semifinal		Final	
Athlete	Event	Result	Rank	Result	Rank	Result	Rank
Luis Sarria	200 m	21.18	13 Q	21.24	12	Did not advance	
José Manuel Abascal	1500 m	3:47.6	29	Did not advance			
Fernando Cerrada	5000 m	13:40.4	18	—		Did not advance	
Javier Moracho	110 m hurdles	14.15	15 Q	14.16	=11	Did not advance	
Juan Lloveras	110 m hurdles	14.17	16	Did not advance			
José Alonso	400 m hurdles	50.27	3 Q	50.32	6 Q	50.19	7
Antonio Campos	3000 m steeplechase	8:38.2	11	Did not advance			
Domingo Ramón	3000 m steeplechase	9:07.8	31	Did not advance			
Antonio Romero	Marathon	—				2:19:26.4	26
José Marín	20 km walk	—				1:24:38.1	5
José Marín	50 km walk	—				DNF	
Agustín Jorba	50 km walk	—				DNF	
Jordi Llopart	50 km walk	—				3:53:29.9 CR	1st place, gold medalist(s)

Field events

Athlete	Event	Qualification		Final	
Athlete	Event	Distance	Position	Distance	Position
Alberto Solanas	Long jump	7.36	21	Did not advance	

Women
Track & road events

Athlete	Event	Heats		Semifinal		Final	
Athlete	Event	Result	Rank	Result	Rank	Result	Rank
Carmen Valero	3000 m	—				9:34.0	23
Rosa María Colorado	400 m hurdles	59.76	22	Did not advance			
Montserrat Pujol	400 m hurdles	60.21	24	Did not advance			
