= Spain at the 2016 European Athletics Championships =

- WA code: ESP
- National federation: RFEA

in Amsterdam
- Competitors: 77 (47 men and 30 women) in 40 events
- Medals Ranked 6th: Gold 3 Silver 4 Bronze 1 Total 8

European Athletics Championships appearances (overview)
- 1950; 1954; 1958; 1962; 1966; 1969; 1971; 1974; 1978; 1982; 1986; 1990; 1994; 1998; 2002; 2006; 2010; 2012; 2014; 2016; 2018; 2022; 2024

Spain competed at the 2016 European Athletics Championships in Amsterdam, Netherlands, between 6 and 10 July 2016.

The final selection was announced by the RFEA.

== Medals ==
Medal	Name	Event	Date
Gold	Ruth Beitia	Women's high jump	7 July
Gold	Bruno Hortelano	Men's 200 metres	8 July
Gold	Ilias Fifa	Men's 5000 metres	10 July
Silver	Sergio Fernández	Men's 400 metres hurdles	8 July
Silver	David Bustos	Men's 1500 metres	9 July
Silver	Carles Castillejo; Jesús España; Iván Fernández; Ayad Lamdassem	Men's half marathon team	10 July
Silver	Adel Mechaal	Men's 5000 metres	10 July
Bronze	Antonio Abadía	Men's 10,000 metres	8 July

== Results ==
Men
Track & road events

Athlete	Event	Qualifying round		Semifinal		Final	
Athlete	Event	Result	Rank	Result	Rank	Result	Rank
Ángel David Rodríguez	100 m	10.40	13 Q	12.13	24	Did not advance	
Bruno Hortelano	100 m	—N/a		10.22	11 Q	10.12	4
Bruno Hortelano	200 m	20.55	1 Q	20.39 NR	2 Q	20.45	1st place, gold medalist(s)
Lucas Búa	400 m	47.00	10 Q	46.26	18	Did not advance	
Samuel García	400 m	—N/a		46.43	20	Did not advance	
Daniel Andújar	800 m	1:49.57	15 Q	1:47.64	11	Did not advance	
Álvaro de Arriba	800 m	1:48.62	9 Q	1:47.40	8 q	1:47.58	7
Kevin López	800 m	DNS		Did not advance			
Marc Alcalá	1500 m	3:43.43	22	—N/a		Did not advance	
David Bustos	1500 m	3:40.60	9 q	—N/a		3:46.90	2nd place, silver medalist(s)
Llorenç Sales	1500 m	3:51.49	36	—N/a		Did not advance	
Ilias Fifa	5000 m	—N/a				13:40.85	1st place, gold medalist(s)
Carlos Mayo	5000 m	—N/a				13:58.22	14
Adel Mechaal	5000 m	—N/a				13:40.85	2nd place, silver medalist(s)
Antonio Abadía	10000 m	—N/a				28:26.07	3rd place, bronze medalist(s)
Daniel Mateo	10000 m	—N/a				28:43.03 PB	7
Juan Antonio Pérez	10000 m	—N/a				28:37.42	6
Javier Colomo	110 m hurdles	13.76	11 Q	13.88	22	Did not advance	
Yidiel Contreras	110 m hurdles	13.46 SB	2 Q	13.47	9 Q	13.54	7
Gerard Mateu Porras	110 m hurdles	14.11	19	Did not advance			
Javier Delgado	400 m hurdles	52.15	21	Did not advance			
Sergio Fernández	400 m hurdles	—N/a		49.20	6 Q	49.06	2nd place, silver medalist(s)
Mark Ujakpor	400 m hurdles	—N/a		DNF		Did not advance	
Fernando Carro	3000 m steeplechase	8:33.69	11 Q	—N/a		8:40.73	10
Sebastián Martos	3000 m steeplechase	8:31.98	3 Q	—N/a		8:31.93 SB	4
Abdelaziz Merzougui	3000 m steeplechase	8:34.34	13 q	—N/a		8:51.37	14
Alberto Gavaldá; Óscar Husillos; Ángel David Rodríguez; Mauro Triana	4×100 m relay	39.15 SB	9	—N/a		Did not advance	
Lucas Búa; Sergio Fernández; Samuel García; Lluís Vallejo	4×400 m relay	3:04.77	10	—N/a		Did not advance	
Carles Castillejo	Half marathon	—N/a				1:03:52	8
Jesús España	Half marathon	—N/a				1:04:01	10
Iván Fernández	Half marathon	—N/a				1:09:38	72
Ayad Lamdassem	Half marathon	—N/a				1:04:13	12
Carles Castillejo; Jesús España; Iván Fernández; Ayad Lamdassem	Half marathon team	—N/a				3:12:06	2nd place, silver medalist(s)

Field events

Athlete	Event	Qualification		Final	
Athlete	Event	Distance	Position	Distance	Position
Eusebio Cáceres	Long jump	7.91	11 q	NM	
Jean Marie Okutu	Long jump	7.80	13	Did not advance	
Pablo Torrijos	Triple jump	16.58	8 q	16.34	8
Miguel Ángel Sancho	High Jump	2.25 SB	=1 Q	NM	
Simón Siverio	High Jump	2.19	=19	Did not advance	
Didac Salas	Pole vault	5.15	27	Did not advance	
Adrián Vallés	Pole vault	5.50	6 q	5.30	=11
Carlos Tobalina	Shot put	20.16 SB	7 q	19.85	10
Borja Vivas	Shot put	20.12	9 q	20.16	8
Frank Casañas	Discus throw	59.06	24	Did not advance	
Lois Maikel Martínez	Discus throw	66.00	1 Q	59.27	12
Javier Cienfuegos	Hammer throw	72.73	=11 q	68.17	12

Combined events – Decathlon

Athlete	Event	100 m	LJ	SP	HJ	400 m	110H	DT	PV	JT	1500 m	Final	Rank
Jorge Ureña	Result	11.04	7.54	13.61	2.04	50.07	13.95	NM	5.00	52.26	DNS	DNF	
Jorge Ureña	Points	852	945	704	840	811	981	0	910	622	—	DNF	

Women
Track & road events

Athlete	Event	Qualifying round		Semifinal		Final	
Athlete	Event	Result	Rank	Result	Rank	Result	Rank
Estela García	100 m	11.64	=15	Did not advance			
Estela García	200 m	23.40	10 Q	23.53	17	Did not advance	
Nana Jacob	200 m	23.43	11 Q	23.45	15	Did not advance	
Aauri Bokesa	400 m	53.46	8 Q	52.39 SB	10	Did not advance	
Laura Bueno	400 m	54.01	14	Did not advance			
Indira Terrero	400 m	DNF		Did not advance			
Esther Guerrero	800 m	2:03.72	10 Q	2:01.62	7	Did not advance	
Solange Pereira	1500 m	4:11.48	5 q	—N/a		4:34.88	8
Marta Pérez	1500 m	4:17.24	17	—N/a		Did not advance	
Trihas Gebre	5000 m	—N/a				DNS	
Trihas Gebre	10,000 m	—N/a				32:20.45	10
Caridad Jerez	100 metres hurdles	13.21	12 q	DQ		Did not advance	
Diana Martín	3000 m steeplechase	9:45.90	10 q	—N/a		9:43.65	8
Irene Sánchez-Escribano	3000 m steeplechase	10:08.12	24	—N/a		Did not advance	
Estela García; Nana Jacob; Cristina Lara; María Isabel Pérez	4×100 m relay	44.14 SB	10	—N/a		Did not advance	
Aauri Bokesa; Laura Bueno; Bárbara Camblor; Geraxane Ussia	4×400 m relay	3:33.57 SB	14	—N/a		Did not advance	
Alessandra Aguilar	Half marathon	—N/a				1:13:28	27
Azucena Díaz	Half marathon	—N/a				1:14:21	36
Estela Navascues	Half marathon	—N/a				1:17:16	56
Marta Silvestre	Half marathon	—N/a				DNF	
Alessandra Aguilar; Azucena Díaz; Estela Navascues; Marta Silvestre	Half marathon team	—N/a				3:45:05	11

Field events

Athlete	Event	Qualification		Final	
Athlete	Event	Distance	Position	Distance	Position
Juliet Itoya	Long jump	6.35	16	Did not advance	
María del Mar Jover	Long jump	6.43	13	Did not advance	
Patricia Sarrapio	Triple jump	13.46	19	Did not advance	
Ruth Beitia	High jump	1.92	3 Q	1.98 SB	1st place, gold medalist(s)
Úrsula Ruiz	Shot put	16.86	11 q	17.14 SB	10
Belén Toimil	Shot put	16.00	21	Did not advance	
Sabina Asenjo	Discus throw	59.72	12 Q	56.62	12
Lidia Parada	Javelin throw	57.34 SB	15	Did not advance	
Berta Castells	Hammer throw	68.07	12 q	63.27	12
Laura Redondo	Hammer throw	65.23	21	Did not advance	
