= Spain at the 2014 European Athletics Championships =

- WA code: ESP
- National federation: RFEA
- Website: www.rfea.es

in Zürich
- Competitors: 74 in 40 events
- Medals Ranked 8th: Gold 2 Silver 1 Bronze 3 Total 6

European Athletics Championships appearances (overview)
- 1950; 1954; 1958; 1962; 1966; 1969; 1971; 1974; 1978; 1982; 1986; 1990; 1994; 1998; 2002; 2006; 2010; 2012; 2014; 2016; 2018; 2022; 2024

Spain is competing at the 2014 European Athletics Championships in Zürich, Switzerland, from 12 to 17 August 2014.

The following athletes has been selected to compete by the Spanish Athletics Federation.

== Medals ==
Medal	Name	Event	Date
Gold	Miguel Ángel López	Men's 20 km walk	13 August
Gold	Ruth Beitia	Women's high jump	17 August
Silver	Borja Vivas	Men's Shot Put	12 August
Bronze	Ángel Mullera	Men's 3000 metres steeplechase	14 August
Bronze	Indira Terrero	Women's 400 metres	15 August
Bronze	Diana Martín	Women's 3000 metres steeplechase	17 August

== Results ==
Men
Track & road events

Athlete	Event	Qualifying Round		Semifinal		Final	
Athlete	Event	Result	Rank	Result	Rank	Result	Rank
Ángel David Rodríguez	100 m	10.44	24 Q	10.76	22	did not advance	
Eduard Villes	100 m	10.57	31	did not advance			
Sergio Ruíz	200 m	20.73	15 q	20.85	15	did not advance	
Samuel García	400 m	45.80	9 Q	45.58	6 Q	46.35	7
Kevin López	800 m	1:47.93	9 Q	1:48.90	14	did not advance	
Luis Alberto Marco	800 m	1:50.07	29	did not advance			
David Bustos	1500 m	4:21.39	31 q	—		3:46.92	6
Adel Mechaal	1500 m	3:47.60	25	—		did not advance	
Manuel Olmedo	1500 m	3:40.48	16	—		did not advance	
Antonio Abadía	5000 m	—				14:11.89	8
Roberto Aláiz	5000 m	—				14:11.47	5
Jesus España	5000 m	—				14:14.57	11
Manuel Ángel Penas	10000 m	—				DNF	
Sergio Fernández	400 m hurdles	50.89	27	did not advance			
Víctor García	3000 m steeplechase	DNF		—		did not advance	
Sebastian Martos	3000 m steeplechase	8:34.35	7 q	—		8:30.08	4
Ángel Mullera	3000 m steeplechase	8:36.33	12 q	—		8:29.16	3rd place, bronze medalist(s)
Adria Burriel; Iván Jesús Ramos; Ángel David Rodríguez; Sergio Ruíz; Eduard Villes	4 × 100 m relay	DNF		—		did not advance	
Lucas Bua; Pau Fradera; Samuel García; Jesús Pérez; Mark Ujakpor	4 × 400 m relay	3:04.68	9	—		did not advance	
Javier Guerra	Marathon	—				2h12:32	4
Luis Alberto Amezcua	20 km walk	—				1:22:26	10
Miguel Ángel López	20 km walk	—				1:19:44	1st place, gold medalist(s)
Alvaro Martín	20 km walk	—				1:21:41	6
Francisco Arcilla	50 km walk	—				4:00:57	21
Jesús Ángel García	50 km walk	—				3:45:41	8

Field events

Athlete	Event	Qualification		Final	
Athlete	Event	Distance	Position	Distance	Position
Eusebio Cáceres	Long jump	8.05	2 Q	8.11	4
Luis Méliz	Long jump	6.85	28	did not advance	
Jean Marie Okutu	Long jump	7.64	20	did not advance	
Jorge Gimeno	Triple jump	15.98	17	did not advance	
Pablo Torrijos	Triple jump	16.66	5 Q	16.56	8
Igor Bychkov	Pole vault	5.30	16	did not advance	
Didac Salas	Pole vault	NM		did not advance	
Carlos Tobalina	Shot put	20.06	9 q	20.04	9
Yioser Toledo	Shot put	19.59	15	did not advance	
Borja Vivas	Shot put	20.53	2 Q	20.86	2nd place, silver medalist(s)
Frank Casañas	Discus throw	62.32	10 q	61.47	8
Mario Pestano	Discus throw	62.10	11 q	62.31	6
Javier Cienfuegos	Hammer throw	72.55	15	did not advance	

Women
Track & road events

Athlete	Event	Qualifying Round		Semifinal		Final	
Athlete	Event	Result	Rank	Result	Rank	Result	Rank
Estela García	100 m	11.72	29	did not advance			
Aauri Bokesa	400 m	51.86	6 Q	51.84	3 Q	52.39	8
Indira Terrero	400 m	51.62	3 Q	52.07	4 Q	51.38	3rd place, bronze medalist(s)
Khadija Rahmouni	800 m	2:08.09	27	did not advance			
Isabel Macías	1500 m	4:17.76	23	—		did not advance	
Nuria Fernández	5000 m	—				15:35.59	5
Paula González	5000 m	—				16:24.58	16
Gema Barrachina	10,000 m	—				33:24.65	18
Dolores Checa	10,000 m	—				DNS	
Lidia Rodríguez	10,000 m	—				33:17.39	17
Caridad Jerez	100 metres hurdles	13.23	21	did not advance			
Laura Sotomayor	400 metres hurdles	57.54	17	did not advance			
Diana Martín	3000 m steeplechase	9:52.63	11 Q	—		9:30.70	3rd place, bronze medalist(s)
Teresa Urbina	3000 m steeplechase	DNF		—		did not advance	
Alba Fernández; Estela García; Juliet Itoya; Cristina Lara; María Isabel Pérez	4 × 100 m relay	44.68	14	—		did not advance	
Alessandra Aguilar	Marathon	—				DNF	
Raquel González	20 km walk	—				1:30.03	10
Beatriz Pascual	20 km walk	—				1:29.02	8
María José Poves	20 km walk	—				1:32.02	16

Field events

Athlete	Event	Qualification		Final	
Athlete	Event	Distance	Position	Distance	Position
Juliet Itoya	Long jump	6.20	21	did not advance	
Maria del Mar Jover	Long jump	6.36	14	did not advance	
Ruth Ndoumbe	Triple jump	14.01	4 q	14.14	4
Patricia Sarrapio	Triple jump	13.41	17	did not advance	
Ruth Beitia	High jump	1.89	1 Q	2.01	1st place, gold medalist(s)
Naroa Agirre	Pole vault	4.35	16	did not advance	
Úrsula Ruiz	Shot put	15.79	14	did not advance	
Sabina Asenjo	Discus throw	—		NM	
Mercedes Chilla	Javelin throw	57,82	11 Q	57.91	10
Berta Castells	Hammer throw	NM		did not advance	
