= Spain at the 2018 European Athletics Championships =

- WA code: ESP
- National federation: RFEA

in Berlin
- Medals: Gold 2 Silver 4 Bronze 4 Total 10

European Athletics Championships appearances (overview)
- 1950; 1954; 1958; 1962; 1966; 1969; 1971; 1974; 1978; 1982; 1986; 1990; 1994; 1998; 2002; 2006; 2010; 2012; 2014; 2016; 2018; 2022; 2024

Spain competed at the 2018 European Athletics Championships in Berlin, Germany, between 7 and 12 August 2018. This event was part of the 2018 European Championships

== Medals ==
Medal	Name	Event	Date
Gold	Álvaro Martín	Men's 20 km race walk	11 August
Gold	María Pérez	Women's 20 km race walk	11 August
(silver) Silver	Fernando Carro	Men's 3000 m steeplechase	9 August
Silver	Diego García	Men's 20 km race walk	11 August
Silver	Camilo Santiago; Iraitz Arrospide; Javier Guerra; Jesús España; Pedro Nimo	Men's Marathon cup	11 August
Silver	Júlia Takács	Women's 50 km race walk	7 August
Bronze	Ana Peleteiro	Women's triple jump	10 August
Bronze	Orlando Ortega	Men's 110 m hurdles	10 August
Bronze	Lucas Búa; Samuel García; Bruno Hortelano; Óscar Husillos; Darwin Echeverry; Mark Ujakpor	Men's 4×400 m relay	10 August
Bronze	Azucena Díaz; Marta Galimany; Trihas Gebre; Elena Loyo; Clara Simal	Women's Marathon cup	11 August

== Results ==
Men
Track & road events

Athlete	Event	Qualifying Round		Semifinal		Final	
Athlete	Event	Result	Rank	Result	Rank	Result	Rank
Aitor Ekobo	100 m	10.51	24	did not advance			
Patrick Chinedu Ike	100 m	10.54	29	did not advance			
Ángel David Rodríguez	100 m	10.55	30	did not advance			
Bruno Hortelano	200 m	BYE		20.29	2 Q	20.05	4
Sergio Juárez	200 m	21.33	28	did not advance			
Pol Retamal	200 m	20.92	16	did not advance			
Daniel Rodríguez	200 m	20.81	14 Q	20.77	16	did not advance	
Lucas Búa	400 m	BYE		45.48	13	did not advance	
Samuel García	400 m	45.63	6 q	45.87	21	did not advance	
Óscar Husillos	400 m	BYE		45.17	9 Q	45.61	6
Daniel Andújar	800 m	1:46.99	10 q	1:48.10	16	did not advance	
Álvaro de Arriba	800 m	1:46.48	4 Q	1:46.43	6 q	1:46.41	7
Saúl Ordóñez	800 m	1:47.95	16 Q	1:46.82	10	did not advance	
Adrián Ben	1500 m	3:42.81	17	—N/a		did not advance	
Antonio Abadía	5000 m	—N/a				13:34.25	13
Adel Mechaal	5000 m	—N/a				DNF	
Adel Mechaal	10000 m	—N/a				28:13.78	4
Juan Antonio Pérez	5000 m	—N/a				13:37.07	16
Juan Antonio Pérez	10000 m	—N/a				28:31.31	9
Daniel Mateo	10000 m	—N/a				28:44.43	12
Orlando Ortega	110 m hurdles	BYE		13.21	1 Q	13.34	3rd place, bronze medalist(s)
Sergio Fernández	400 m hurdles	BYE		49.19	9 q	48.98	7
Aleix Porras	400 m hurdles	51.69	22	did not advance			
Daniel Arce	3000 m steeplechase	8:29.25	9 Q	—N/a		8:38.12	6
Fernando Carro	3000 m steeplechase	8:29.63	10 Q	—N/a		8:34.16	2nd place, silver medalist(s)
Sebastián Martos	3000 m steeplechase	8:29.67	11 q	—N/a		8:46.76	14
Patrick Chinedu Ike; Pol Retamal; Daniel Rodríguez; Ángel David Rodríguez	4×100 m relay	39.12	9	—N/a		did not advance	
Lucas Búa; Samuel García; Bruno Hortelano ^{(only final)} Óscar Husillos ^{(only final)} Darwin Echeverry ^{(only heat)} Mark Ujakpor ^{(only heat)}	4×400 m relay	3:04.62	8 Q	—N/a		3:00.78	3rd place, bronze medalist(s)
Camilo Santiago	Marathon	—N/a				2:17:24	16
Iraitz Arrospide	Marathon	—N/a				2:19:49	34
Javier Guerra	Marathon	—N/a				2:12:22	4
Jesús España	Marathon	—N/a				2:12:58	6
Pedro Nimo	Marathon	—N/a				2:18:43	22
Camilo Santiago; Iraitz Arrospide; Javier Guerra; Jesús España; Pedro Nimo	Marathon Cup	—N/a				6:42:43	2nd place, silver medalist(s)
Alberto Amezcua	20 km walk	—N/a				1:23:33	17
Álvaro Martín	20 km walk	—N/a				1:20:42	1st place, gold medalist(s)
Diego García	20 km walk	—N/a				1:20:48	2nd place, silver medalist(s)
Miguel Ángel López	20 km walk	—N/a				1:21:27	6
Chuso García Bragado	50 km walk	—N/a				DNF	
José Ignacio Díaz	50 km walk	—N/a				3:55:28	9
Marc Tur	50 km walk	—N/a				4:09:18	22

Field events

Athlete	Event	Qualification		Final	
Athlete	Event	Distance	Position	Distance	Position
Jean Marie Okutu	Long jump	7.66	17	did not advance	
Marcos Ruiz	Triple jump	16.59	7 q	16.44	10
Pablo Torrijos	Triple jump	16.79	2 Q	16.74	5
Didac Salas	Pole vault	5.36	29	Did not advance	
Adrián Vallés	Pole vault	NM		Did not advance	
Carlos Tobalina	Shot put	19.41	18	did not advance	
Lois Maikel Martínez	Discus throw	54.56	24	did not advance	
Javier Cienfuegos	Hammer throw	72.76	15	did not advance	
Pedro José Martín	Hammer throw	67.56	30	did not advance	
Nicolás Quijera	Javelin throw	73.27	24	did not advance	

Combined events – Decathlon

Athlete	Event	100 m	LJ	SP	HJ	400 m	110H	DT	PV	JT	1500 m	Final	Rank
Jorge Ureña	Result	10.87	7.24	13.58	2.02	48.50	14.39	37.02	NM	61.39	4:29.26	7208	16
Jorge Ureña	Points	890	871	703	822	885	925	604	0	759	749	7208	16

Women
Track & road events

Athlete	Event	Qualifying Round		Semifinal		Final	
Athlete	Event	Result	Rank	Result	Rank	Result	Rank
Cristina Lara	100 m	11.65	18	did not advance			
María Isabel Pérez	100 m	11.70	21	did not advance			
Jaël Bestué	200 m	23.92	19	Did not advance			
Estela García	200 m	23.64	14 q	23.46	19	did not advance	
Paula Sevilla	200 m	23.91	18	Did not advance			
Laura Bueno	400 m	52.14	8 Q	52.46	22	did not advance	
Esther Guerrero	1500 m	4:10.14	12 q	—N/a		4:09.88	11
Solange Pereira	1500 m	4:10.63	16	—N/a		Did not advance	
Marta Pérez	1500 m	4:08.85	3 Q	—N/a		4:07.65	9
Tania Carretero	10000 m	—N/a				DNF	
Nuria Lugueros	10000 m	—N/a				32:55.30	11
Maitane Melero	10000 m	—N/a				32:52.59	9
Caridad Jerez	100 m hurdles	13.19	8 Q	15.34	24	did not advance	
Sara Gallego	400 m hurdles	57.18	10 q	57.25	19	did not advance	
Irene Sánchez-Escribano	3000 m steeplechase	9:34.69	11 Q	—N/a		9:31.84	8
María José Pérez	3000 m steeplechase	9:44.72	20	—N/a		Did not advance	
Estela García; Cristina Lara; María Isabel Pérez; Paula Sevilla	4×100 m relay	43.38	7 q	—N/a		43.54	8
Aauri Bokesa; Laura Bueno; Herminia Parra; Cármen Sánchez	4×400 m relay	3:33.18	11	—N/a		Did not advance	
Azucena Díaz	Marathon	—N/a				2:34:00	13
Marta Galimany	Marathon	—N/a				2:37:54	24
Trihas Gebre	Marathon	—N/a				2:32:13	9
Elena Loyo	Marathon	—N/a				2:37:54	23
Clara Simal	Marathon	—N/a				DNF	
Azucena Díaz; Marta Galimany; Trihas Gebre; Elena Loyo; Clara Simal	Marathon Cup	—N/a				7:44:06	3rd place, bronze medalist(s)
Laura García-Caro	20 km walk	—N/a				1:28:15	6
María Pérez	20 km walk	—N/a				1:26:36	1st place, gold medalist(s)
Raquel González	20 km walk	—N/a				1:31:48	12
Ainhoa Pinedo	50 km walk	—N/a				4:27:03	5
Mar Juárez	50 km walk	—N/a				4:28:58	6
Júlia Takács	50 km walk	—N/a				4:15:22	2nd place, silver medalist(s)

Field events

Athlete	Event	Qualification		Final	
Athlete	Event	Distance	Position	Distance	Position
Fátima Diame	Long jump	6.24	22	did not advance	
Juliet Itoya	Long jump	6.65	7 q	6.38	10
Ana Peleteiro	Triple jump	14.27	7 Q	14.44	3rd place, bronze medalist(s)
Patricia Sarrapio	Triple jump	13.87	20	did not advance	
María Vicente	Triple jump	13.50	25	did not advance	
Maialen Axpe	Pole vault	4.35	19	did not advance	
Mónica Clemente	Pole vault	4.20	22	did not advance	
Úrsula Ruiz	Shot put	17.06	13	did not advance	
Sabina Asenjo	Discus throw	55.57	15	did not advance	
Arantza Moreno	Javelin throw	56.33	18	did not advance	
Lidia Parada	Javelin throw	58.08	14	did not advance	

Combined events – Heptathlon

Athlete	Event	100H	HJ	SP	200 m	LJ	JT	800 m	Final	Rank
Carmen Ramos	Result	14.18	1.61	12.54	25.18	DNS	-	-	DNF	
Carmen Ramos	Points	953	747	697	870	-	-	-	DNF	

== See also ==
- Spain at the 2018 European Championships
