= Raquel González =

Raquel González may refer to:

- Raquel González (athlete) (born 1989), Spanish racewalker
- Raquel González (wrestler) (born 1991), American wrestler
