= Estela Navascués =

Spanish long-distance runner

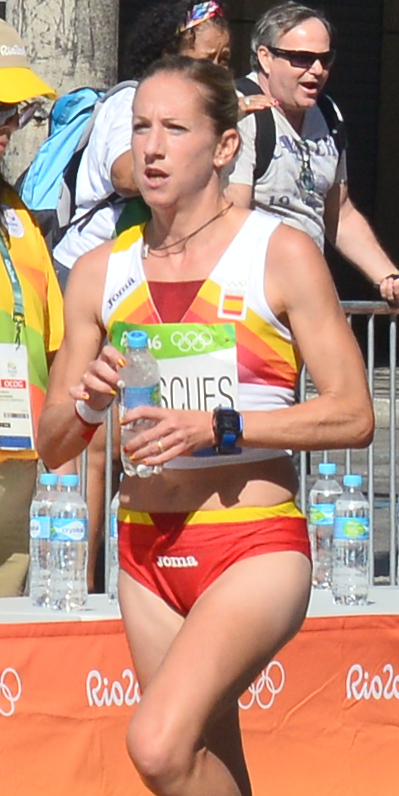
- Navascués at the 2016 Olympics

Personal information
- Born: 3 February 1981 (age 45)
- Height: 163 cm (5 ft 4 in)
- Weight: 50 kg (110 lb)

Sport
- Sport: Track and field
- Event: 5000 m – marathon
- Club: New Balance Team
- Coached by: Abel Anton Rodrigo

Achievements and titles
- Personal bests: 5000 m – 15:55.33 (2008); 10,000 m – 33:10.68 (2011) marathon – 2:32:38 (2013)

Estela Navascués (born 3 February 1981) is a Spanish long-distance runner. She competed in the marathon at the 2016 Summer Olympics, but failed to finish. She took up athletics in 1997 and started competing internationally in 2010.

== Achievements ==
Year	Competition	Venue	Position	Event	Notes
Representing Spain
2011	European Cross Country Championships	Velenje, Slovenia	46th	8 km cross	28:19
2016	European Championships	Amsterdam, Netherlands	56th	Half marathon	1:17:16
2016	Summer Olympics	Rio de Janeiro, Brazil	-	Marathon	DNF
