= Miguel Navarro (runner) =

Spanish long-distance runner (1929–2022)

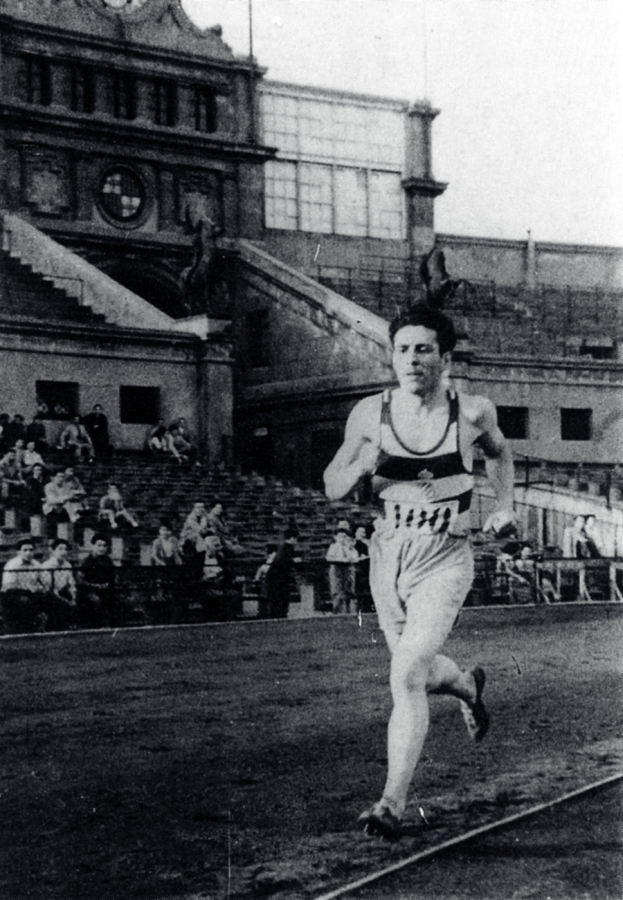

Personal information
- Nationality: Spanish
- Born: 22 November 1929 Barcelona, Spain
- Died: 20 March 2022 (aged 92)

Sport
- Sport: Long-distance running
- Event: Marathon

Miguel Navarro (22 November 1929 – 20 March 2022) was a Spanish long-distance runner. He competed in the marathon at the 1960 Summer Olympics.
