= Agustín Fernández (runner) =

Spanish long-distance runner

Personal information
- Full name: Agustín Fernández Díaz-Pavón
- Nationality: Spanish
- Born: 11 May 1938 (age 87) Herencia, Ciudad Real, Spain
- Height: 165 cm (5 ft 5 in)
- Weight: 58 kg (128 lb)

Sport
- Sport: Long-distance running
- Event: Marathon

Agustín Fernández Díaz-Pavón (Note: In this Spanish name, the first or paternal surname is Fernández and the second or maternal family name is Díaz-Pavón.) (born 11 May 1938) is a Spanish long-distance runner. He competed in the marathon at the 1972 Summer Olympics and the 1976 Summer Olympics.
