= Ester Navarrete =

Spanish runner (born 1990)

Ester Navarrete Santana (born 16 March 1990) is a Spanish runner. A nurse by profession, Navarrete requested a leave of absence from her job to focus on athletics full time; her time of 2:24:40 in her debut marathon in Seville clinched her a spot at the 2024 Summer Olympics and netted her a Spanish national championship. In the women's marathon at the Olympics, she placed 42nd with a time of 2:32:07.

== Personal life ==
Navarette has a son who was born in 2021.

== International awards ==
European Running Championships
Year	Location	Medal	Event
2025	Brussels-Leuven	Gold	Team marathon

Navarrete won gold in this event as a member of Team Spain, and shared the podium with Fátima Ouhaddou Nafie and Majida Maayouf
