= Royal Spanish Athletics Federation =

- Real Federación Española de Atletismo
- Sport: Athletics
- Abbreviation: (RFEA)
- Founded: March 27, 1920
- Affiliation: World Athletics
- Affiliation date: 1918
- Regional affiliation: EAA
- President: Raúl Chapado Serrano
- Secretary: José Luis de Carlos
- Replaced: Federación Atlética Española

Official website
- atletismorfea.es
- (Spain)

The Royal Spanish Athletics Federation (Spanish: Real Federación Española de Atletismo, RFEA), is the governing body for the sport of athletics in Spain. As of 2023, the federation has 1,323 registered clubs and 87,532 federated athletes.

== History ==
If his first attempt to organize Interfédérale can be made back to 1917, when the first championships were held in Spain, it was not until March 27, 1920 that meet in Bilbao a meeting with Spanish Athletics Federation for to create a Federación Atlética Española: an interim board was established, chaired by Mr. Laffitte.

== Kit suppliers ==
Spain's kits are supplied by Joma.

== See also ==
- Spanish records in athletics
