= Spain at the European Athletics Championships =

Sporting event delegation

Spain has participated in all editions of the European Athletics Championships since the 1950 edition.

These are the results of the Spanish athletes at the European Athletics Championships

== Medal count ==
Edition	Gold	Silver	Bronze	Total
1934 to 1946	Did not participate			
(Belgium) Brussels – 1950	0	0	0	0
(Switzerland) Bern – 1954	0	0	0	0
(Sweden) Stockholm – 1958	0	0	0	0
(Socialist Federal Republic of Yugoslavia) Belgrade – 1962	0	0	0	0
(Hungary) Budapest – 1966	0	0	0	0
(Greece) Athens – 1969	0	0	0	0
(Finland) Helsinki – 1971	0	0	0	0
(Italy) Rome – 1974	0	0	0	0
(Czechoslovakia) Prague – 1978	1	0	0	1
(Greece) Athens – 1982	1	2	2	5
(West Germany) Stuttgart – 1986	1	0	2	3
(Socialist Federal Republic of Yugoslavia) Split – 1990	0	2	0	2
(Finland) Helsinki – 1994	3	2	4	9
(Hungary) Budapest – 1998	2	1	4	7
(Germany) Munich – 2002	6	3	6	15
(Sweden) Gothenburg – 2006	3	3	5	11
(Spain) Barcelona – 2010	2	2	2	6
(Finland) Helsinki – 2012	1	1	3	5
(Switzerland) Zürich – 2014	2	1	3	6
(Netherlands) Amsterdam – 2016	3	4	1	8
(Germany) Berlin – 2018	2	3	5	10
(France) Paris – 2020	Cancelled due to the COVID-19 pandemic in Europe			
(Germany) Munich – 2022	4	3	3	10
(Italy) Rome – 2024	2	3	3	8
(United Kingdom) Birmingham – 2026	2	2	4	8
Total	36	30	41	107

== List of medalists ==
Men

Medal	Athlete	Championship	Discipline
Gold	Jorge Llopart	1978 Prague	50 km walk
Gold	José Marín	1982 Athens	20 km walk
Silver	Antonio Corgos	1982 Athens	Long jump
Silver	José Marín	1982 Athens	50 km walk
Bronze	Domingo Ramón	1982 Athens	3000 m steeplechase
Bronze	José Manuel Abascal	1982 Athens	1500 m
Bronze	Miguel Ángel Prieto	1986 Stuttgart	20 km walk
Bronze	Carles Sala	1986 Stuttgart	110 m hurdles
Silver	Daniel Plaza	1990 Split	20 km walk
Silver	Ángel Hernández	1990 Split	Long jump
Gold	Abel Antón	1994 Helsinki	10,000 m
Gold	Fermín Cacho	1994 Helsinki	1500 m
Gold	Martín Fiz	1994 Helsinki	Marathon
Silver	Isaac Viciosa	1994 Helsinki	1500 m
Silver	Diego García	1994 Helsinki	Marathon
Bronze	Valentí Massana	1994 Helsinki	20 km walk
Bronze	Tomás de Teresa	1994 Helsinki	800 m
Bronze	Abel Antón	1994 Helsinki	5000 m
Bronze	Alberto Juzdado	1994 Helsinki	Marathon
Gold	Reyes Estevez	1998 Budapest	1500 m
Gold	Isaac Viciosa	1998 Budapest	5000 m
Silver	Manuel Pancorbo	1998 Budapest	5000 m
Bronze	Paquillo Fernández	1998 Budapest	20 km walk
Bronze	Fermín Cacho	1998 Budapest	1500 m
Bronze	Juan Vicente Trull; Antonio Andrés; Andrés Martínez; David Canal	1998 Budapest	4 × 400 m
Gold	Paquillo Fernández	2002 Munich	20 km walk
Gold	José Manuel Martínez	2002 Munich	10,000 m
Gold	Antonio Jiménez	2002 Munich	3000 m steeplechase
Gold	Alberto García	2002 Munich	5000 m
Silver	David Canal	2002 Munich	400 m
Silver	Reyes Estévez	2002 Munich	1500 m
Bronze	Juan Manuel Molina	2002 Munich	20 km walk
Bronze	José Ríos	2002 Munich	10,000 m
Bronze	Jesús Ángel García	2002 Munich	50 km walk
Bronze	Luis Miguel Martín	2002 Munich	3000 m steeplechase
Bronze	Julio Rey	2002 Munich	Marathon
Bronze	Yago Lamela	2002 Munich	Long jump
Gold	Paquillo Fernández	2006 Gothenburg	20 km walk
Gold	Jesús España	2006 Gothenburg	5000 m
Silver	José Manuel Martínez	2006 Gothenburg	10,000 m
Silver	Jesús Ángel García	2006 Gothenburg	50 km walk
Silver	José Luis Blanco	2006 Gothenburg	3000 m steeplechase
Bronze	Juan Carlos de la Ossa	2006 Gothenburg	10,000 m
Bronze	Juan Carlos Higuero	2006 Gothenburg	1500 m
Bronze	Juan Carlos Higuero	2006 Gothenburg	5000 m
Bronze	Julio Rey	2006 Gothenburg	Marathon
Gold	Arturo Casado	2010 Barcelona	1500 m
Silver	Jesús España	2010 Barcelona	5000 m
Silver	José Manuel Martínez	2010 Barcelona	Marathon
Bronze	Manuel Olmedo	2010 Barcelona	1500 m
Silver	Luis Felipe Méliz	2012 Helsinki	Long jump
Bronze	Víctor García	2012 Helsinki	3000 m steeplechase
Bronze	David Bustos	2012 Helsinki	1500 m
Gold	Miguel Ángel López	2014 Zürich	20 km walk
Silver	Borja Vivas	2014 Zürich	Shot Put
Bronze	Ángel Mullera	2014 Zürich	3000 m steeplechase
Gold	Bruno Hortelano	2016 Amsterdam	200 m
Gold	Ilias Fifa	2016 Amsterdam	5000 m
Silver	Sergio Fernández	2016 Amsterdam	400 m hurdles
Silver	David Bustos	2016 Amsterdam	1500 m
Silver	Carles Castillejo; Jesús España; Ayad Lamdassem; Iván Fernández	2016 Amsterdam	Half marathon
Silver	Adel Mechaal	2016 Amsterdam	5000 m
Bronze	Antonio Abadía	2016 Amsterdam	10,000 m
Gold	Álvaro Martín	2018 Berlin	20 km walk
Silver	Fernando Carro	2018 Berlin	3,000 m steeplechase
Silver	Diego García	2018 Berlin	20 km walk
Silver	Javier Guerra; Jesús España; Camilo Santiago	2018 Berlin	Marathon Cup
Bronze	Orlando Ortega	2018 Berlin	110 m hurdles
Bronze	Óscar Husillos; Lucas Búa; Samuel García; Bruno Hortelano	2018 Berlin	4 x 400 m
Gold	Miguel Ángel López	2022 Munich	35 km walk
Gold	Asier Martínez	2022 Munich	110 m hurdles
Gold	Álvaro Martín	2022 Munich	20 km walk
Gold	Mariano García	2022 Munich	800 m
Silver	Mohamed Katir	2022 Munich	5000 m
Bronze	Ayad Lamdassem; Jorge Blanco; Daniel Mateo; Yago Rojo; Abdelaziz Merzougui	2022 Munich	Marathon Cup
Bronze	Mario García	2022 Munich	1500 m
Bronze	Diego García	2022 Munich	20 km walk
Gold	Jordan Díaz	2024 Rome	Triple jump
Silver	Paul McGrath	2024 Rome	20 km walk
Silver	Enrique Llopis	2024 Rome	110 m hurdles
Silver	Mohamed Attaoui	2024 Rome	800 m
Bronze	Thierry Ndikumwenayo	2024 Rome	10,000 m
Gold	Paul McGrath	2026 Birmingham	Half marathon walk
Silver	Miguel Ángel López	2026 Birmingham	Marathon walk

Women

Medal	Athlete	Championship	Discipline
Gold	Mari Cruz Díaz	1986 Suttgart	10 km walk
Bronze	Marta Domínguez	1998 Budapest	5000 m
Gold	Glory Alozie	2002 Munich	100 m hurdles
Gold	Marta Domínguez	2002 Munich	5000 m
Silver	Mayte Martínez	2002 Munich	800 m
Gold	Marta Domínguez	2006 Gothenburg	5000 m
Bronze	Mercedes Chilla	2006 Gothenburg	Javelin throw
Gold	Nuria Fernández	2010 Barcelona	1500 m
Bronze	Natalia Rodríguez	2010 Barcelona	1500 m
Gold	Ruth Beitia	2012 Helsinki	High jump
Bronze	Nuria Fernández	2012 Helsinki	1500 m
Gold	Ruth Beitia	2014 Zürich	High jump
Bronze	Indira Terrero	2014 Zürich	400 m
Bronze	Diana Martín	2014 Zürich	3000 m steeplechase
Gold	Ruth Beitia	2016 Amsterdam	High jump
Gold	María Pérez	2018 Berlin	20 km walk
Bronze	Ana Peleteiro	2018 Berlin	Triple jump
Bronze	Júlia Takács	2018 Berlin	50 km walk
Bronze	Trihas Gebre; María Azucena Díaz; Elena Loyo	2018 Berlin	Marathon Cup
Silver	Marta Galimany; Irene Pelayo; Elena Loyo; Laura Méndez	2022 Munich	Marathon Cup
Silver	Raquel González	2022 Munich	35 km walk
Gold	Ana Peleteiro	2024 Rome	Triple jump
Silver	Marta García	2024 Rome	5000 m
Bronze	Meritxell Soler; Ester Navarrete; Fatima Ouhaddou; Laura Méndez	2024 Rome	Half marathon cup
Gold	María Pérez	2026 Birmingham	Half marathon walk
Bronze	Raquel González	2026 Birmingham	Marathon walk
Bronze	Meritxell Soler; Ester Navarrete; Fatima Ouhaddou; Carolina Robles	2026 Birmingham	Marathon cup

== Multiple medalists ==
Athlete	Event	Gold	Silver	Bronze	Total
Ruth Beitia	High jump	3	0	0	3
Paquillo Fernández	20 km walk	2	0	1	3
Marta Domínguez	5000 metres	2	0	1	3
Miguel Ángel López	20/35 km walk	2	0	0	2
Álvaro Martín	20 km walk	2	0	0	2
Jesús España	5000/Half marathon/Marathon Cup	1	3	0	4
José Manuel Martínez	10,000/Marathon	1	2	0	3
Reyes Estévez	1500 metres	1	1	0	2
José Marín	20/50 km walk	1	1	0	2
Isaac Viciosa	1500/5000 m	1	1	0	2
Abel Antón	5000/10,000 m	1	0	1	2
Fermín Cacho	1500 metres	1	0	1	2
Nuria Fernández	1500 metres	1	0	1	2
Bruno Hortelano	200 m/4 x 400 m	1	0	1	2
David Bustos	1500 metres	0	1	1	2
David Canal	400 m/4 x 400 m	0	1	1	2
Diego García	20 km walk	0	1	1	2
Jesús Ángel García	50 km walk	0	1	1	2
Ayad Lamdassem	Marathon Cup	0	1	1	2
Elena Loyo	Marathon Cup	0	1	1	2
Juan Carlos Higuero	1500/5000 m	0	0	2	2
Julio Rey	Marathon	0	0	2	2

== Medals by event ==
Event	Gold (men)	Silver (men)	Bronze (men)	Total (men)	Gold (women)	Silver (women)	Bronze (women)	Total (women)	Gold (total)	Silver (total)	Bronze (total)	Total (total)
100 metres	0	0	0	0	0	0	0	0	0	0	0	0
200 metres	1	0	0	1	0	0	0	0	1	0	0	1
400 metres	0	1	0	1	0	0	1	1	0	1	1	2
800 metres	1	0	1	2	0	1	0	1	1	1	1	3
1500 metres	3	3	6	12	1	0	2	3	4	3	8	15
3000/5000 metres	4	4	2	10	2	0	1	3	6	4	3	13
10,000 metres	2	1	3	6	0	0	0	0	2	1	3	6
80/100/110 m hurdles	1	0	2	3	1	0	0	1	2	0	2	4
400 metres hurdles	0	1	0	1	0	0	0	0	0	1	0	1
3000 m steeplechase	1	2	4	7	0	0	1	1	1	2	5	8
4 x 100 metres	0	0	0	0	0	0	0	0	0	0	0	0
4 x 400 metres	0	0	2	2	0	0	0	0	0	0	2	2
Marathon/Half marathon	1	4	4	9	0	1	1	2	1	5	5	11
10/20 km walk	6	2	5	13	2	0	0	2	8	2	5	15
35/50 km walk	2	2	1	5	0	1	1	2	2	3	2	7
High jump	0	0	0	0	3	0	0	3	3	0	0	3
Pole vault	0	0	0	0	0	0	0	0	0	0	0	0
Long jump	0	3	1	4	0	0	0	0	0	3	1	4
Triple jump	0	0	0	0	0	0	1	1	0	0	1	1
Shot put	0	1	0	1	0	0	0	0	0	1	0	1
Discus throw	0	0	0	0	0	0	0	0	0	0	0	0
Hammer throw	0	0	0	0	0	0	0	0	0	0	0	0
Javelin throw	0	0	0	0	0	0	1	1	0	0	1	1
Decathlon/Heptathlon	0	0	0	0	0	0	0	0	0	0	0	0
TOTAL	22	24	31	77	9	3	9	21	31	27	40	98

== See also ==
- Royal Spanish Athletics Federation
