= 2024 European Half Marathon Cup – Women =

Women's half marathon team at the 2024 European Athletics Championships
- Venue: Stadio Olimpico
- Location: Rome
- Dates: 9 June (final)
- Competitors: 43 from 10 nations
- Winning time: 3:29:01

Medalists
gold medal	Calli Hauger-Thackery; Abbie Donnelly; Clara Evans; Lauren McNeil	Great Britain
silver medal	Melat Yisak Kejeta; Domenika Mayer; Esther Pfeiffer; Fabienne Königstein; Katharina Steinruck	Germany
bronze medal	Laura Luengo; Esther Navarrete; Fatima Ouhaddou; Meritxell Soler; Lidia Campo; Laura Méndez Esquer	Spain

The 2024 European Half Marathon Cup for women, the second edition of the competition, was held as part of the women's half marathon at the 2024 European Athletics Championships, which took place at the Stadio Olimpico on 9 June.

== Schedule ==
Date	Time	Round
9 June 2024	09:30	Final

All times are local times (UTC+2)

== Results ==
Rank	Nation	Athletes	Time
1st place, gold medalist(s)	Great Britain	Calli Hauger-Thackery, Abbie Donnelly, Clara Evans, Lauren McNeil	3:29:01
2nd place, silver medalist(s)	Germany	Melat Yisak Kejeta, Domenika Mayer, Esther Pfeiffer, Fabienne Königstein, Katharina Steinruck	3:31:59
3rd place, bronze medalist(s)	Spain	Laura Luengo, Esther Navarrete, Fatima Ouhaddou, Meritxell Soler, Lidia Campo, Laura Méndez Esquer	3:33:16
4	France	Mekdes Woldu, Margaux Sieracki, Mélody Julien, Méline Rollin, Fadouwa Ledhem	3:33:17
5	Italy	Elisa Palmero, Sofiia Yaremchuk, Sara Nestola, Federica Sugamiele	3:35:21
6	Romania	Joan Chelimo Melly, Delvine Relin Meringor, Madalina-Elena Sirbu	3:35:28
7	Portugal	Salomé Rocha, Solange Jesus, Susana Santos, Joana Vanessa Carvalho	3:37:16
8	Poland	Aleksandra Lisowska, Izabela Paszkiewicz, Monika Jackiewicz, Aleksandra Brzezińska, Angelika Mach, Sabina Jarząbek	3:38:03
9	Norway	Karoline Bjerkeli Grøvdal, Hanne Mjøen Maridal, Maria Sagnes Wågan	3:39:20
10	Denmark	Nanna Bové, Carolien Millenaar, Sara Schou Kristensen	3:48:41
