= 2024 European Athletics Championships – Women's half marathon =

Women's half marathon at the 2024 European Athletics Championships
- Venue: Stadio Olimpico
- Location: Rome
- Dates: 9 June (final)
- Competitors: 69 from 27 nations
- Winning time: 1:08:09

Medalists
| gold medal | Karoline Bjerkeli Grøvdal | Norway |
| silver medal | Joan Chelimo Melly | Romania |
| bronze medal | Calli Thackery | Great Britain |

Women's Team at the 2024 European Half Marathon Cup
- Venue: Stadio Olimpico
- Location: Rome
- Dates: 9 June (final)
- Nations: 10
- Winning time: 3:29.01

Medalists
| gold medal | Calli Hauger-Thackery; Abbie Donnelly; Clara Evans; Lauren McNeil | Great Britain |
| silver medal | Melat Yisak Kejeta; Domenika Mayer; Esther Pfeiffer; Fabienne Königstein; Katharina Steinruck | Germany |
| bronze medal | Laura Luengo; Ester Navarrete; Fatima Azzahraa Ouhaddou Nafie; Meritxell Soler; Lidia Campo; Laura Méndez | Spain |

The women's half marathon at the 2024 European Athletics Championships took place at the Stadio Olimpico on 9 June, incorporating the Women's team event for the 2024 European Half Marathon Cup.

== Records ==
Standing records prior to the 2024 European Athletics Championships
| World record | Letesenbet Gidey (ETH) | 1:02:52 | Valencia, Spain | 24 October 2021 |
| European record | Sifan Hassan (NED) | 1:05:15 | Copenhagen, Denmark | 16 September 2018 |
| Championship record | Sara Moreira (POR) | 1:10:19 | Amsterdam, Netherlands | 10 July 2016 |
| World Leading | Joyciline Jepkosgei (KEN) | 1:04.29 | Barcelona, Spain | 11 February 2024 |
| Europe Leading | Joan Chelimo Melly (ROU) | 1:06:58 | Paris, France | 3 March 2024 |

== Schedule ==
| Date | Time | Round |
|---|---|---|
| 9 June 2024 | 09:30 | Final |

All times are local times (UTC+2)

== Results ==
The start is at 09:30.

| Rank | Name | Nationality | Time | Note |
|---|---|---|---|---|
| 1st place, gold medalist(s) | Karoline Bjerkeli Grøvdal | Norway | 1:08:09 | CR |
| 2nd place, silver medalist(s) | Joan Chelimo Melly | Romania | 1:08:55 | |
| 3rd place, bronze medalist(s) | Calli Hauger-Thackery | Great Britain | 1:08:58 | |
| - | Delvine Relin Meringor | Romania | 1:09:25 | SB, DSQ |
| 4 | Melat Yisak Kejeta | Germany | 1:09:42 | |
| 5 | Abbie Donnelly | Great Britain | 1:09:57 | |
| 6 | Fabienne Schlumpf | Switzerland | 1:10:01 | SB |
| 7 | Mekdes Woldu | France | 1:10:04 | SB |
| 8 | Clara Evans | Great Britain | 1:10:06 | PB |
| 9 | Lonah Chemtai Salpeter | Israel | 1:10:28 | SB |
| 10 | Domenika Mayer | Germany | 1:10:49 | |
| 11 | Laura Luengo | Spain | 1:10:54 | SB |
| 12 | Ester Navarrete | Spain | 1:11:08 | SB |
| 13 | Fatima Azzahraa Ouhaddou Nafie | Spain | 1:11:14 | SB |
| 14 | Elisa Palmero | Italy | 1:11:22 | PB |
| 15 | Margaux Sieracki | France | 1:11:24 | |
| 16 | Lauren McNeil | Great Britain | 1:11:26 | |
| 17 | Esther Pfeiffer | Germany | 1:11:28 | |
| 18 | Sofiia Yaremchuk | Italy | 1:11:32 | |
| 19 | Fabienne Königstein | Germany | 1:11:34 | |
| 20 | Juliette Thomas | Belgium | 1:11:35 | |
| 21 | Helen Bekele | Switzerland | 1:11:36 | SB |
| 22 | Tereza Hrochová | Czech Republic | 1:11:38 | PB |
| 23 | Salomé Rocha | Portugal | 1:11:42 | PB |
| 24 | Matea Parlov Koštro | Croatia | 1:11:48 | |
| 25 | Mélody Julien | France | 1:11:49 | SB |
| 26 | Alisa Vainio | Finland | 1:11:50 | SB |
| 27 | Solange Jesus | Portugal | 1:12:03 | PB |
| 28 | Aleksandra Lisowska | Poland | 1:12:06 | PB |
| 29 | Hanne Verbruggen | Belgium | 1:12:12 | |
| 30 | Izabela Paszkiewicz | Poland | 1:12:15 | SB |
| 31 | Meritxell Soler | Spain | 1:12:16 | |
| 32 | Anne Luijten | Netherlands | 1:12:17 | |
| 33 | Shona Heaslip | Ireland | 1:12:19 | SB |
| 34 | Sara Nestola | Italy | 1:12:27 | |
| 35 | Julia Mayer | Austria | 1:12:40 | |
| 36 | Katharina Steinruck | Germany | 1:12:48 | |
| 37 | Maor Tiyouri | Israel | 1:12:55 | |
| 38 | Méline Rollin | France | 1:13:07 | SB |
| 39 | Lidia Campo | Spain | 1:13:25 | |
| 40 | Viktoriia Kaliuzhna | Ukraine | 1:13:25 | |
| 41 | Jacelyn Gruppen | Netherlands | 1:13:26 | |
| 42 | Nóra Szabó | Hungary | 1:13:27 | =SB |
| 43 | Susana Santos | Portugal | 1:13:31 | |
| 44 | Moira Stewartová | Czech Republic | 1:13:41 | |
| 45 | Monika Jackiewicz | Poland | 1:13:42 | |
| 46 | Fadouwa Ledhem | France | 1:14:07 | |
| 47 | Hanne Mjøen Maridal | Norway | 1:14:09 | SB |
| 48 | Aleksandra Brzezińska | Poland | 1:14:21 | |
| 49 | Olga Nyzhnyk | Ukraine | 1:14:23 | SB |
| 50 | Joana Vanessa Carvalho | Portugal | 1:14:26 | |
| 51 | Loreta Kančytė | Lithuania | 1:14:56 | SB |
| 52 | Nanna Bové | Denmark | 1:15:16 | SB |
| 53 | Federica Sugamiele | Italy | 1:15:34 | SB |
| 54 | Angelika Mach | Poland | 1:15:55 | SB |
| 55 | Özlem Kaya Alıcı | Turkey | 1:16:04 | |
| 56 | Anja Fink | Slovenia | 1:16:24 | SB |
| 57 | Laura Méndez | Spain | 1:16:28 | SB |
| 58 | Militsa Mircheva | Bulgaria | 1:16:30 | |
| 59 | Carolien Millenaar | Denmark | 1:16:40 | |
| 60 | Sara Schou Kristensen | Denmark | 1:16:45 | |
| 61 | Sabina Jarząbek | Poland | 1:16:48 | |
| 62 | Maria Sagnes Wågan | Norway | 1:17:02 | |
| 63 | Emily Haggard-Kearney | Ireland | 1:17:04 | SB |
| 64 | Madalina-Elena Sirbu | Romania | 1:17:08 | |
| 65 | Panagiota Vlachaki | Greece | 1:21:56 | |
| | Hanna Lindholm | Sweden | DNF | |
| | Camilla Richardsson | Finland | DNF | |
| | Meryem Erdoğan | Turkey | DNF | |

== Team ==
https://www.the-sports.org/athletics-european-championships-results-2024-women-epf110969.html

1. Great Britain
2. Germany
3. Spain
4. France
5. Italy
6. Romania
7. Portugal
8. Poland
9. Norway
10. Denmark
