= European Half Marathon Cup =

- Status: active
- Genre: Half Marathon competitions
- Date: August
- Frequency: quadrennial
- Location: various
- Inaugurated: 2016
- Previous event: 2016
- Next event: 2024
- Organiser: EAA

The European Half Marathon Cup is a quadrennial team marathon competition between European countries held for the first time in 2016, incorporated in the half marathon events of the European Athletics Championships. The event alternates biennially with the European Marathon Cup which is held under similar rules when the European Athletics Championships are held in non-Olympic years.

== Editions ==
Year	Edition	City	Country	Date	Men	Women
2016	1st	Amsterdam	Netherlands	10 July		
~~2020~~	~~2nd~~	Paris	France	Cancelled due to Covid19		
2024	2nd	Rome	Italy	9 June		

== Medals ==
In italic the participants whose result did not go into the team's total time, but were awarded with medals.

=== Men ===
Year	Gold	Silver	Bronze
2016	(Switzerland) Switzerland; Tadesse Abraham; Julien Lyon; Adrian Leman; Christian Kreienbühl; Marcel Bernie; Andreas Kempf	(Spain) Spain; Carles Castillejo; Jesús España; Ayad Lamdassem; Iván Fernández	(Italy) Italy; Daniele Meucci; Stefano La Rosa; Ruggero Pertile; Xavier Chevrier; Daniele D'Onofrio
2020	postponed due to covid pandemic		
2024	Italy; Yemaneberhan Crippa; Pietro Riva; Pasquale Selvarolo; Eyob Faniel; Yohanes Chiappinelli; Daniele Meucci	Israel; Maru Teferi; Gashau Ayale; Girmaw Amare; Haimro Alame; Godadaw Belachew; Tesema Moges	Germany; Amanal Petros; Samuel Fitwi Sibhatu; Filimon Abraham; Richard Ringer; Simon Boch; Hendrik Pfeiffer

=== Women ===
Year	Gold	Silver	Bronze
2016	(Portugal) Portugal; Sara Moreira; Jessica Augusto; Dulce Félix; Marisa Barros; Vanessa Fernandes	(Italy) Italy; Veronica Inglese; Anna Incerti; Rosaria Console; Laila Soufyane; Catherine Bertone	(Turkey) Turkey; Esma Aydemir; Sultan Haydar; Sevilay Eytemiş; Tubay Erdal; Yasemin Can; Meryem Erdoğan
2020	postponed due to covid pandemic.		
2024	Great Britain; Calli Hauger-Thackery; Abbie Donnelly; Clara Evans; Lauren McNeil	Germany; Melat Yisak Kejeta; Domenika Mayer; Esther Pfeiffer; Fabienne Königstein; Katharina Steinruck	Spain; Laura Luengo; Esther Navarrete; Fatima Azzahraa Ouhaddou Nafie; Meritxell Soler; Lidia Campo; Laura Méndez

== All-time medal table ==
Rank	Nation	Gold	Silver	Bronze	Total
1	Italy (ITA)	1	1	1	3
2	Great Britain (GBR)	1	0	0	1
2	Portugal (POR)	1	0	0	1
2	Switzerland (SUI)	1	0	0	1
5	Germany (GER)	0	1	1	2
5	Spain (ESP)	0	1	1	2
7	Israel (ISR)	0	1	0	1
8	Turkey (TUR)	0	0	1	1
Totals (8 entries)		4	4	4	12

== See also ==
- European Marathon Cup
- European Athletics Championships
