= 2022 European 10,000m Cup =

- Organisers: EAA
- Edition: 25th
- Date: 28 May
- Host city: Pacé, Ille-et-Vilaine, France
- Venue: Stade Chassebœuf
- Events: 2
- Participation: 117 athletes from 29 nations

The 2022 European 10,000m Cup took place on 28 May 2022 in Pacé, France.

== Medallists ==
Event	Gold	Silver	Bronze
Individual
Men	(France) Jimmy Gressier; 27:24.51 PB	(Spain) Carlos Mayo; 27:53.12	(Turkey) Aras Kaya; 27:58.08 SB
Women	(Turkey) Yasemin Can; 31:20.18 EL	(Germany) Alina Reh; 31:39.86 SB	(Germany) Katharina Steinruck; 32:03.88 PB
Team
Men	France; 1:23:30.11	Spain; 1:24:05.79	Germany; 1:24:47.49
Women	Germany; 1:36:09.44	Turkey; 1:37:14.68	Great Britain; 1:37:54.89

== Results ==
=== Men's ===
Individual race
Rank	Heat	Athlete	Nationality	Time	Note
1st place, gold medalist(s)	A	Jimmy Gressier	France	27:24.51	PB
2nd place, silver medalist(s)	A	Carlos Mayo	Spain	27:53.12	
3rd place, bronze medalist(s)	A	Aras Kaya	Turkey	27:58.08	SB
4	A	Yann Schrub	France	27:59.32	SB
5	A	Pietro Riva	Italy	28:01.07	PB
6	A	Efrem Gidey	Ireland	28:01.50	SB
7	A	Filimon Abraham	Germany	28:03.39	PB
8	A	Roberto Aláiz	Spain	28:04.01	PB
9	A	Nils Voigt	Germany	28:04.81	SB
10	A	Gashau Ayale	Israel	28:05.37	
11	A	Emmanuel Roudolff	France	28:06.28	PB
12	A	Florian Carvalho	France	28:06.30	SB
13	A	Andreas Vojta	Austria	28:06.88	PB
14	A	Samuel Barata	Portugal	28:08.11	SB
15	A	Soufiane Bouchikhi	Belgium	28:08.49	SB
16	A	Juan Antonio Pérez	Spain	28:08.66	SB
17	A	Tadesse Getahon	Israel	28:09.75	PB
18	A	Magnus Myhre	Norway	28:10.60	
19	A	Italo Quazzola	Italy	28:28.04	
20	B	Pasquale Selvarolo	Italy	28:30.35	PB
21	A	Jesús Ramos	Spain	28:32.33	SB
22	A	Bukayawe Malede	Israel	28:35.16	
23	A	Yago Rojo	Spain	28:35.77	
24	B	Sezgin Ataç	Turkey	28:37.38	PB
25	A	Mahamed Mahamed	Great Britain	28:38.03	
26	A	Simon Boch	Germany	28:39.29	
27	A	Peter Herzog	Austria	28:40.80	SB
28	B	Nicolae Alexandru Soare	Romania	28:42.63	SB
29	A	Yoann Kowal	France	28:47.47	
30	B	Ömer Amaçtan	Turkey	29:08.66	
31	B	Ramazan Baştuğ	Turkey	29:13.73	
32	B	Marios Anagnostou	Greece	29:15.92	PB
33	B	Jacob Simonsen	Denmark	29:17.29	PB
34	A	Jamal Abdelmaji Eisa Mohammed	ART	29:19.90	
35	A	David Nilsson	Sweden	29:20.93	
36	A	Corentin Le Roy	France	29:26.26	
37	B	Luca Alfieri	Italy	29:36.15	
38	A	Zakaria Boufaljat	Spain	29:38.31	
39	B	Ihor Porozov	Ukraine	29:41.40	SB
40	B	Uģis Jocis	Latvia	29:44.28	PB
41	A	Dereje Chekole	Israel	30:00.68	
42	B	Paul O'Donnell	Ireland	30:01.39	SB
43	A	Jack O'Leary	Ireland	30:06.80	SB
44	B	Omer Ramon	Israel	30:09.84	
45	B	Hannu Granberg	Finland	30:10.10	
46	B	Primož Kobe	Slovenia	30:13.17	SB
47	B	Leonid Latsepov	Estonia	30:15.86	SB
48	B	Rune Bækgaard	Denmark	30:17.32	SB
49	B	Levente Szemerei	Hungary	30:19.59	
50	B	Arttu Vattulainen	Finland	30:24.16	SB
51	B	Antti Ihamäki	Finland	30:29.90	SB
52	B	Tachlowini Gabriyesos	ART	30:36.01	
53	B	Bob Bertemes	Luxembourg	30:39.60	PB
54	B	Michael Jensen	Denmark	31:15.47	SB
55	B	Seyed Ghafari	ART	31:25.52	SB
	A	Tadesse Abraham	Switzerland	DNF	
	A	Yitayew Abuhay	Israel	DNF	
	A	Zerei Kbrom Mezngi	Norway	DNF	
	B	Homiyu Tesfaye	Germany	DNF	
	B	Vadym Lonskyy	Ukraine	DNF	
	B	Hlynur Andrésson	Iceland	DNF	
	B	Francesco Guerra	Italy	DNF	
	B	Ivan Strebkov	Ukraine	DNF	
	A	Tom Anderson	Great Britain	DNS	

Teams
Rank	Team	Time	Note
1st place, gold medalist(s)	France	1:23:30.11	
2nd place, silver medalist(s)	Spain	1:24:05.79	
3rd place, bronze medalist(s)	Germany	1:24:47.49	
4	Israel	1:24:50.28	
5	Italy	1:24:59.46	
6	Turkey	1:25:44.12	
7	Ireland	1:28:09.69	
8	Denmark	1:30:50.08	
9	Finland	1:30:50.08	
10	ART	1:31:21.43	
	Ukraine	DNF	

=== Women's ===
Individual race
Rank	Heat	Athlete	Nationality	Time	Note
1st place, gold medalist(s)	A	Yasemin Can	Turkey	31:20.18	EL
2nd place, silver medalist(s)	A	Alina Reh	Germany	31:39.86	SB
3rd place, bronze medalist(s)	A	Katharina Steinruck	Germany	32:03.88	PB
4	A	Valeriya Zinenko	Ukraine	32:07.28	PB
5	A	Maitane Melero	Spain	32:08.57	PB
6	A	Moira Stewartová	Czech Republic	32:08.96	NR
7	A	Anna Arnaudo	Italy	32:09.54	EU23L
8	A	Mekdes Woldu	France	32:11.72	PB
9	A	Abbie Donnelly	Great Britain	32:20.82	PB
10	A	Eva Dieterich	Germany	32:25.70	PB
11	A	Silke Jonkman	Netherlands	32:31.19	
12	A	Giovanna Epis	Italy	32:34.01	PB
13	A	Camilla Richardsson	Finland	32:35.76	
14	A	Hannah Irwin	Great Britain	32:44.38	
15	A	Lauren Heyes	Great Britain	32:49.69	
16	A	Yayla Günen	Turkey	32:53.16	PB
17	A	Meritxell Soler	Spain	32:54.28	PB
18	A	Izabela Paszkiewicz	Poland	32:54.45	SB
19	A	Domenika Mayer	Germany	33:00.29	
20	A	Fatma Karasu	Turkey	33:01.34	PB
21	B	Tereza Hrochová	Czech Republic	33:08.81	SB
22	A	Margaux Sieracki	France	33:09.80	PB
23	B	Angelika Mach	Poland	33:12.31	PB
24	B	Rebecca Lonedo	Italy	33:15.86	PB
25	B	Nicole Egger	Switzerland	33:20.39	PB
26	A	Philippa Bowden	Great Britain	33:22.05	
27	B	Ine Bakken	Norway	33:24.73	PB
28	A	Jessica Gibbon	Great Britain	33:24.86	
29	B	Esther Navarrete	Spain	33:27.38	
30	B	Méline Rollin	France	33:28.05	PB
31	A	Bohdana Semyonova	Ukraine	33:29.55	SB
32	B	Leila Hadji	France	33:30.96	
33	A	Ann-Marie McGlynn	Ireland	33:31.73	SB
34	A	Beatriz Álvarez	Spain	33:34.60	
35	B	Mathilde Sénéchal	France	33:37.17	
36	B	Karawan Halabi	Israel	33:45.87	PB
37	B	Giovanna Selva	Italy	33:47.41	PB
38	B	Viktoriia Kaliuzhna	Ukraine	33:47.48	SB
39	B	Chloé Herbiet	Belgium	33:50.39	
40	A	Mélody Julien	France	33:52.93	SB
41	B	Monika Jackiewicz	Poland	33:59.64	SB
42	B	Nina Lauwaert	Belgium	34:19.03	
43	A	Aoibhe Richardson	Ireland	34:22.31	
44	B	Nina Chydenius	Finland	34:24.45	SB
45	A	Emma Mitchell	Ireland	34:32.39	SB
46	B	Eirini Tsoupaki	Greece	34:58.67	PB
47	B	Neja Kršinar	Slovenia	35:21.80	SB
48	B	Grace Lynch	Ireland	35:35.85	SB
49	A	Yuliya Shmatenko	Ukraine	36:22.76	SB
	A	Esma Aydemir	Turkey	DNF	
	A	Stephanie Twell	Great Britain	DNF	
	B	Gaia Colli	Italy	DNF	
	B	Hanne Mjøen Maridal	Norway	DNF	

Teams
Rank	Team	Time	Note
1st place, gold medalist(s)	Germany	1:36:09.44	
2nd place, silver medalist(s)	Turkey	1:37:14.68	
3rd place, bronze medalist(s)	Great Britain	1:37:54.89	
4	Italy	1:37:59.41	
5	Spain	1:38:30.23	
6	France	1:38:49.57	
7	Ukraine	1:39:24.31	
8	Poland	1:40:06.40	
9	Ireland	1:42:26.43	
