= Athletics at the 2024 Summer Olympics – Women's marathon =

Women's marathon at the Games of the XXXIII Olympiad
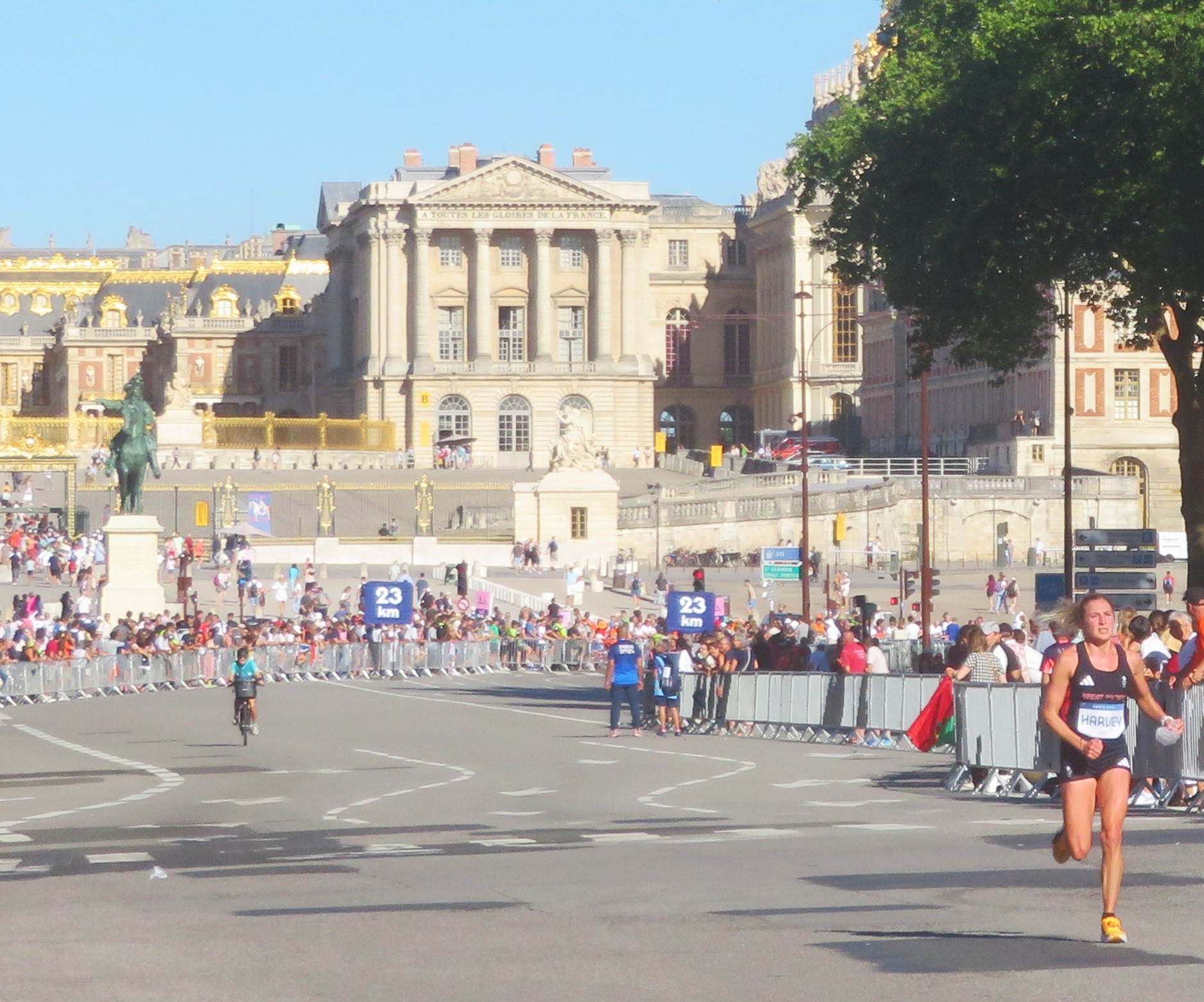
- Rose Harvey of Great Britain runs past the Palace of Versailles, retracing the route of the Women's March on Versailles.
- Venue: Paris
- Date: 11 August 2024
- Winning time: 2:22:55 OR

Medalists
1st place, gold medalist(s)		Sifan Hassan	Netherlands
2nd place, silver medalist(s)		Tigst Assefa	Ethiopia
3rd place, bronze medalist(s)		Hellen Obiri	Kenya

The women's marathon at the 2024 Summer Olympics was held in Paris, France, on 11 August 2024. It was the 11th occurrence of the event at the Summer Olympics.

== Summary ==
The race began at 08:00 Central European Summer Time (UTC+2) with a starting temperature of approximately 19.4°C (67°F), slightly warmer than the men's marathon held the day before. As is typical for championship marathons, the race began with a large lead pack that gradually decreased in size as runners dropped off the pace. By 15 kilometers, 21 runners remained. There was a 428-metre (1,400 feet) hill climb over the next 3K. Mélody Julien of host France broke away from the lead pack, establishing a 15-meter lead near the Palace of Versailles. Approximately one hour into the race, Jessica Stenson then moved into the lead. At the halfway point, following the main uphill section, the leading trio consisted of Mélody Julien, Jessica Stenson and Dakotah Lindwurm.

After passing a water station near the Palace, Lindwurm emerged off the front, but Lonah Chemtai Salpeter and Sardana Trofimova, caught up at 24K. Salpeter maintained the lead until Tigst Assefa and Peres Jepchirchir closed the gap within the next kilometer. Over the next 5K, the pack whittled down to 12. At about 28K, the race had its steepest climb, some of it up to a 13.5% grade. Amane Beriso Shankule took the lead there, followed by a smaller pack including Assefa, Hellen Obiri, Salpeter, Jepchirchir, Sharon Lokedi, Eunice Chumba, Delvine Relin Meringor, and Yuka Suzuki.

On the downhill, Sifan Hassan caught up to the lead pack. Over the next 5 kilometres, the pack had reduced to 7 athletes. Meringor and Suzuki lost contact with the group over the following 5 kilometres. Going into the final 2 kilometres, Shankule fell off the pace from the lead group. Over the final sprint, Hassan took the lead, winning the gold medal three seconds ahead of silver medalist Assefa. Obiri won the bronze, 12 seconds further back.

Hassan's winning time of 2:22:55 set a new Olympic record, surpassing the previous record of 2:23:07 set in London in 2012. Hassan's winning margin of three seconds over a distance of greater than 26 miles (42 km) was the narrowest of any women's marathon at the Olympics. After the race, the Ethiopian team filed a protest to disqualify Hassan due to obstruction, which was rejected by the Jury of Appeal. At the post-race news conference, Tigst remarked (through a translator) "I didn’t expect at that moment it would happen. Maybe at that moment, if she didn’t push me I would have the gold."

A total of 91 athletes started the race, with 80 completing the course. Kinzang Lhamo of Bhutan was the final finisher, completing the marathon in 3:52:59, and received widespread praise for her determination and embodiment of the Olympic spirit.

== Background ==
The women's marathon has been present on the Olympic athletics programme since 1984.

In its four-decade-long Olympic history since the 1984 Los Angeles Games, the women's marathon occurred on the last day of the athletics program for the first time, with the men's race scheduled a day before. According to Tony Estanguet, the president of the Paris 2024 organising committee, "We wanted to reverse the order in an ambition to more gender equality and bring women to the fore for the first time so the women's marathon will enjoy major visibility on 11 August to cap off the athletics program."

== Course ==
The marathon course began at the Hôtel de Ville and traversed many of the host city's most iconic landmarks such as the Eiffel Tower and the Louvre before concluding at the Les Invalides. Paris officials have stated the route has taken inspiration from la marche de femmes. The route was characterized by significant elevation changes, totaling approximately 436 meters of ascent and 438 meters of descent, with gradients reaching up to 13.5%. Due to the elevation profile, the course has been discussed as one of the more challenging Olympic marathons.

== Records ==
Global records before the 2024 Summer Olympics
Record	Athlete (Nation)	Time	Location	Date
World record	Tigst Assefa (ETH)	2:11:53	Berlin, Germany	24 September 2023
Olympic record	Tiki Gelana (ETH)	2:23:07	London, Great Britain	5 August 2012
World leading	Sutume Kebede (ETH)	2:15:55	Tokyo, Japan	3 March 2024

Area records before the 2024 Summer Olympics
Area Record	Athlete (Nation)	Time
Africa (records)	Tigst Assefa (ETH)	2:11:53 WR
Asia (records)	Honami Maeda (JPN)	2:18:59
Europe (records)	Sifan Hassan (NED)	2:13:44
North, Central America and Caribbean (records)	Emily Sisson (USA)	2:18:29
Oceania (records)	Sinead Diver (AUS)	2:21:34
South America (records)	Florencia Borelli (ARG)	2:24:18

== Qualification ==
For the women's marathon event, the qualification period was between 1 July 2023 and 30 June 2024. 95 athletes were able to qualify for the event, with a maximum of three athletes per nation, by running the entry standard of 2:26.50 seconds or faster or by their World Athletics Ranking for this event.

== Results ==
The event was held on 11 August 2024 starting at 08:00 (UTC+2) in the morning with 91 athletes taking part. Sifan Hassan placed first with an Olympic record of 2:22:55.

Rank	Athlete	Nation	Time	Time Behind	Notes
1st place, gold medalist(s)	Sifan Hassan	Netherlands	2:22:55	–	OR
2nd place, silver medalist(s)	Tigst Assefa	Ethiopia	2:22:58	+0:03	
3rd place, bronze medalist(s)	Hellen Obiri	Kenya	2:23:10	+0:15	PB
4	Sharon Lokedi	Kenya	2:23:14	+0:19	PB
5	Amane Beriso Shankule	Ethiopia	2:23:57	+1:02	
6	Yuka Suzuki	Japan	2:24:02	+1:07	PB
7	Stella Chesang	Uganda	2:26:01	+3:06	
8	Lonah Chemtai Salpeter	Israel	2:26:08	+3:13	SB
9	Eunice Chebichii Chumba	Bahrain	2:26:10	+3:15	
10	Fatima Ezzahra Gardadi	Morocco	2:26:30	+3:35	
11	Dakotah Lindwurm	United States	2:26:44	+3:49	
12	Jessica Stenson	Australia	2:26:45	+3:50	
13	Sardana Trofimova	Kyrgyzstan	2:26:47	+3:52	NR
14	Peres Jepchirchir	Kenya	2:26:51	+3:56	
15	Fabienne Schlumpf	Switzerland	2:28:10	+5:15	SB
16	Majida Maayouf	Spain	2:28:35	+5:40	SB
17	Thalia Valdivia	Peru	2:29:01	+6:06	
18	Hanne Verbruggen	Belgium	2:29:03	+6:08	SB
19	Mekdes Woldu	France	2:29:20	+6:25	SB
20	Florencia Borelli	Argentina	2:29:29	+6:34	
21	Helen Bekele	Switzerland	2:29:43	+6:48	
22	Emily Sisson	United States	2:29:53	+6:58	
23	Genevieve Gregson	Australia	2:29:56	+7:01	SB
24	Meritxell Soler	Spain	2:29:56	+7:01	
25	Tereza Hrochová	Czech Republic	2:30:00	+7:05	
26	Citlali Cristian	Mexico	2:30:03	+7:08	SB
27	Fionnuala McCormack	Ireland	2:30:12	+7:17	SB
28	Domenika Mayer	Germany	2:30:14	+7:19	
29	Sofiia Yaremchuk	Italy	2:30:20	+7:25	SB
30	Mokulubete Blandina Makatisi	Lesotho	2:30:20	+7:25	PB
31	Cian Oldknow	South Africa	2:30:29	+7:34	
32	Zhanna Mamazhanova	Kazakhstan	2:30:51	+7:56	
33	Tigist Gashaw	Bahrain	2:30:53	+7:58	
34	Malindi Elmore	Canada	2:31:08	+8:13	SB
35	Aleksandra Lisowska	Poland	2:31:10	+8:15	SB
36	Irvette van Zyl	South Africa	2:31:14	+8:19	SB
37	Laura Hottenrott	Germany	2:31:19	+8:24	SB
38	Kaoutar Farkoussi	Morocco	2:31:34	+8:39	
39	Magdalena Shauri	Tanzania	2:31:58	+9:03	SB
40	Daiana Ocampo	Argentina	2:32:02	+9:07	
41	Esther Navarrete	Spain	2:32:07	+9:12	
42	Rose Chelimo	Bahrain	2:32:08	+9:13	
43	Rebecca Cheptegei	Uganda	2:32:14	+9:19	SB
44	Gerda Steyn	South Africa	2:32:51	+9:56	SB
45	Clara Evans	Great Britain	2:33:01	+10:06	SB
46	Galbadrakhyn Khishigsaikhan	Mongolia	2:33:26	+10:31	
47	Bayartsogtyn Mönkhzayaa	Mongolia	2:33:27	+10:32	
48	Maor Tiyouri	Israel	2:33:37	+10:42	
49	Anne Luijten	Netherlands	2:33:42	+10:47	
50	Mao Ichiyama	Japan	2:34:13	+11:18	SB
51	Carolina Wikström	Sweden	2:34:20	+11:25	
52	Mary Zenaida Granja	Ecuador	2:34:34	+11:39	
53	Marie Perrier	Mauritius	2:34:56	+12:01	SB
54	Julia Mayer	Austria	2:35:14	+12:19	
55	Gladys Tejeda	Peru	2:35:36	+12:41	SB
56	Susana Santos	Portugal	2:35:57	+13:02	SB
57	Dolshi Tesfu	Eritrea	2:36:30	+13:35	SB
58	Zhang Deshun	China	2:36:47	+13:52	
59	Camille French	New Zealand	2:37:21	+14:26	
60	Silvia Ortiz	Ecuador	2:37:23	+14:28	SB
61	Luz Mery Rojas	Peru	2:37:24	+14:29	
62	Margarita Hernández	Mexico	2:37:24	+14:29	SB
63	Angelika Mach	Poland	2:37:56	+15:01	SB
64	Camilla Richardsson	Finland	2:38:02	+15:07	SB
65	Moira Stewartová	Czech Republic	2:38:07	+15:12	SB
66	Giovanna Epis	Italy	2:38:26	+15:31	
67	Helalia Johannes	Namibia	2:38:36	+15:41	
68	Mercyline Chelangat	Uganda	2:39:40	+16:45	SB
69	Méline Rollin	France	2:40:17	+17:22	
70	Bojana Bjeljac	Croatia	2:41:13	+18:18	SB
71	Xia Yuyu	China	2:42:10	+19:15	
72	Rosa Chacha	Ecuador	2:42:14	+19:19	
73	Mélody Julien	France	2:42:32	+19:37	SB
74	Angie Orjuela	Colombia	2:42:57	+20:02	SB
75	Bai Li	China	2:44:44	+21:49	
76	Clementine Mukandanga	Rwanda	2:45:40	+22:45	SB
77	Rose Harvey	Great Britain	2:51:03	+28:08	SB
78	Santoshi Shrestha	Nepal	2:55:06	+32:11	PB
79	Kinzang Lhamo	Bhutan	3:52:59	+1:30:04	
—	Matea Parlov Koštro	Croatia	–	35 km	DNF
—	Rahma Tahiri	Morocco	–	35 km	DNF
—	Alemu Megertu	Ethiopia	–	25 km	DNF
—	Chloé Herbiet	Belgium	–	25 km	DNF
—	Calli Thackery	Great Britain	–	25 km	DNF
—	Rutendo Joan Nyahora	Zimbabwe	–	Half	DNF
—	Melat Yisak Kejeta	Germany	–	15 km	DNF
—	Jackline Sakilu	Tanzania	–	15 km	DNF
—	Joan Chelimo Melly	Romania	–	10 km	DNF
—	Sinead Diver	Australia	–	Start	DNF
—	Fiona O'Keeffe	United States	–	Start	DNF
—	Delvine Relin Meringor	Romania	~~2:24:56~~	~~+2:01~~	DSQ
