= Great Britain and Northern Ireland at the 2024 European Athletics Championships =

- Flag of the United Kingdom
- WA code: GBR

in Rome, Italy 7 June 2024 – 12 June 2022
- Competitors: 74 (35 men and 39 women)
- Medals Ranked 3rd: Gold 4 Silver 4 Bronze 5 Total 13

European Athletics Championships appearances
- 1934; 1938; 1946; 1950; 1954; 1958; 1962; 1966; 1969; 1971; 1974; 1978; 1982; 1986; 1990; 1994; 1998; 2002; 2006; 2010; 2012; 2014; 2016; 2018; 2022; 2024; 2026

Great Britain and Northern Ireland competed at the 2024 European Athletics Championships in Rome, Italy from 7–12 June 2024.

== Medallists ==
Medal	Name	Event	Date
Gold	Dina Asher-Smith	100 metres	9 June
Gold	Abbie Donnelly; Clara Evans; Calli Hauger-Thackery; Lauren McNeil	Half marathon team	9 June
Gold	Keely Hodgkinson	800 metres	12 June
Gold	Dina Asher-Smith; Desiree Henry; Amy Hunt; Daryll Neita; Asha Philip (heats)	4 × 100 metres relay	12 June
Silver	George Mills	5000 metres	8 June
Silver	Georgia Bell	1500 metres	9 June
Silver	Charlie Dobson	400 metres	10 June
Silver	Daryll Neita	200 metres	11 June
Bronze	Romell Glave	100 metres	8 June
Bronze	Calli Hauger-Thackery	Half marathon	9 June
Bronze	Elizabeth Bird	3000 metres steeplechase	9 June
Bronze	Molly Caudery	Pole vault	10 June
Bronze	Megan Keith	10,000 metres	11 June

== Results ==
Great Britain and Northern Ireland entered the following athletes.

Key

- Q = Qualified for the next round
- q = Qualified for the next round as a fastest loser or, in field events, by position without achieving the qualifying target
- NR = National record
- PB = Personal best
- SB = Season best
- N/A = Round not applicable for the event

=== Men ===
Track and road events

Athlete	Event	Heat		Semifinal		Final	
Athlete	Event	Result	Rank	Result	Rank	Result	Rank
Romell Glave	100 metres	N/A	N/A	10.11	1Q	10.06	3rd place, bronze medalist(s)
Chijindu Ujah	100 metres	10.23	1Q	10.24	5	N/A	N/A
Jona Efoloko	200 metres	BYE	BYE	20.73	3	N/A	N/A
Jeriel Quainoo	200 metres	BYE	BYE	20.81	7	N/A	N/A
Charles Dobson	400 metres	BYE	BYE	44.65	1Q	44.38	2nd place, silver medalist(s)
Alex Haydock-Wilson	400 metres	46.04	3q	46.05	7	N/A	N/A
Callum Dodds	800 metres	1:46.39	5	N/A	N/A	N/A	N/A
Elliot Giles	800 metres	1:46.44	2Q	1:46.50	2Q	1:47.06	7
Thomas Randolph	800 metres	1:45.58	7q	1:49.18	7	N/A	N/A
Adam Fogg	1500 metres	3:40.83	10qR	—N/a		3:34.44	12
Neil Gourley	1500 metres	3:44.05	1Q	—N/a		3:34.11 SB	9
George Mills	5000 metres	—N/a				13:21.38	2nd place, silver medalist(s)
Jack Rowe	5000 metres	—N/a				13:31.77	17
James West	5000 metres	—N/a				13:24.80	7
Patrick Dever	10,000 metres	—N/a				28:04.43	6
Rory Leonard	10,000 metres	—N/a				28:33.66	25
Zak Mahamed	10,000 metres	—N/a				28:25.31	18
Tade Ojora	110 metres hurdles	BYE	BYE	13.76	7	N/A	N/A
Alastair Chalmers	400 metres hurdles	49.71	3Q	48.76 PB	3	N/A	N/A
Mark Pearce	3000 metres steeplechase	8:34.46	8Q	—N/a		8:26.19	13
Zak Seddon	3000 metres steeplechase	8:28.50	10	—N/a		N/A	N/A
Callum Wilkinson	20 kilometres walk	—N/a				1:21:34	9
Chijindu Ujah; Jona Efoloko; Richard Kilty; Romell Glave	4 × 100 metres relay	39.60	8	—N/a		N/A	N/A
Lewis Davey; Michael Ohioze; Toby Harries; Alex Haydock-Wilson; Charlie Carvell (heats)	4 × 400 metres relay	3:01.69	1Q	—N/a		3:01.89	7

Field events

Athlete	Event	Qualification		Final	
Athlete	Event	Distance	Position	Distance	Position
Jacob Fincham-Dukes	Long jump	8.18m	2Q	8.12m	4
Scott Lincoln	Shot put	20.31m	6Q	20.88m	4
Lawrence Okoye	Discus throw	63.62m	6Q	63.48m	8
Jake Norris	Hammer throw	75.73m	5Q	73.66m	10

=== Women ===
Track and road events

Athlete	Event	Heat		Semifinal		Final	
Athlete	Event	Result	Rank	Result	Rank	Result	Rank
Dina Asher-Smith	100 metres	BYE	BYE	10.96	1Q	10.99	1st place, gold medalist(s)
Amy Hunt	100 metres	11.26	2Q	11.13	3q	11.15	7
Daryll Neita	200 metres	BYE	BYE	22.51	1Q	22.50	2nd place, silver medalist(s)
Laviai Nielsen	400 metres	BYE	BYE	50.73 PB	2Q	50.71 PB	6
Victoria Ohuruogu	400 metres	BYE	BYE	52.07	6	N/A	N/A
Alexandra Bell	800 metres	2:00.98	3Q	2:00.57	4	N/A	N/A
Keely Hodgkinson	800 metres	2:02.46	1Q	1:58.07	1Q	1:58.65	1st place, gold medalist(s)
Erin Wallace	800 metres	2:00.90	5q	1:59.89	6	N/A	N/A
Georgia Bell	1500 metres	4:12.01	2Q	—N/a		4:05.33	2nd place, silver medalist(s)
Jemma Reekie	1500 metres	4:06.68	1Q	—N/a		4:06.17	5
Katie Snowden	1500 metres	4:12.17	3Q	—N/a		4:06.83	9
Izzy Fry	5000 metres	—N/a				15:06.66	9
Amy-Eloise Neale	5000 metres	—N/a				15:33.45	19
Hannah Nuttall	5000 metres	—N/a				15:10.65	10
Megan Keith	10,000 metres	—N/a				31:04.77	3rd place, bronze medalist(s)
Eilish McColgan	10,000 metres	—N/a				DNF	N/A
Jessica Warner-Judd	10,000 metres	—N/a				DNF	N/A
Abbie Donnelly	Half marathon	—N/a				1:06.26	6
Clara Evans	Half marathon	—N/a				1:06.30	9
Calli Hauger-Thackery	Half marathon	—N/a				1:05.29	3rd place, bronze medalist(s)
Lauren McNeil	Half marathon	—N/a				1:07.36	17
Abbie Donnelly; Clara Evans; Calli Hauger-Thackery; Lauren McNeil	Half marathon team	—N/a				3:29.01	1st place, gold medalist(s)
Cindy Sember	100 metres hurdles	BYE	BYE	12.64	1Q	12.56 SB	4
Jessie Knight	400 metres hurdles	BYE	BYE	56.01	7	N/A	N/A
Lina Nielsen	400 metres hurdles	BYE	BYE	54.43 PB	2Q	55.65	7
Elizabeth Bird	3000 metres steeplechase	9:32.87	4Q	—N/a		9:18.39	3rd place, bronze medalist(s)
Dina Asher-Smith; Desiree Henry; Amy Hunt; Daryll Neita; Asha Philip (heats)	4 × 100 metres relay	42.25	1Q	—N/a		41.91 EL	1st place, gold medalist(s)

Field events

Athlete	Event	Qualification		Final	
Athlete	Event	Distance	Position	Distance	Position
Morgan Lake	High jump	1.89m	8Q	1.90m	6
Holly Bradshaw	Pole vault	NM	N/A	N/A	N/A
Molly Caudery	Pole vault	4.50m	=1Q	4.73m	3rd place, bronze medalist(s)
Charlotte Payne	Hammer throw	68.47m	14	N/A	N/A
Anna Purchase	Hammer throw	69.31m	10Q	69.24m	8

Combined events – Heptathlon

Athlete	Event	100H	HJ	SP	200 m	LJ	JT	800 m	Final	Rank
Katarina Johnson-Thompson	Result	13.66 SB	1.83m	12.44m	DNS	N/A	N/A	N/A	DNF	N/A
Katarina Johnson-Thompson	Points	1027	1016	690	N/A	N/A	N/A	N/A	DNF	N/A
Jade O'Dowda	Result	13.70 SB	1.83m SB	12.82m	24.82 SB	6.48m SB	42.33m SB	2:11.30PB	6314 PB	6
Jade O'Dowda	Points	1021	1016	715	903	1036	712	946	6314 PB	6

=== Mixed ===
Track and road events

Athlete	Event	Final	
Athlete	Event	Result	Rank
Charlie Carvell; Hannah Kelly; Lewis Davey; Emily Newnham	4 × 400 metres relay	3:13.97	5
