= 2023 Valencia Marathon =

43rd Valencia Marathon
- Venue: Valencia, Spain
- Date: December 3, 2023

Champions
- Men: Sisay Lemma (ETH) (2:01:48)
- Women: Worknesh Degefa (ETH) (2:15:51)

The 2023 Valencia Marathon was an Elite Platinum Label marathon race held in Valencia, Spain on December 3, 2023. It was the 43rd running of the race.

There were 20 national records set in this marathon. Kenenisa Bekele, was just over 20 seconds behind the lead group at halfway and appeared to have decided not to go with the strong pace at the front. That proved to be a wise move with the 41-year-old Ethiopian legend passing plenty of slowing runners, including Kandie, to take fourth place in a new Masters world record of 2:04:19.

A record-setting number of runners (5,423) finished below three hours. This is more than any other marathon, including the Berlin Marathon and the Boston Marathon. The race also produced more sub-2:45 and sub-2:30 results than any other major marathon.

== Results ==
Elite men's top 30 finishers
Place	Athlete	Nationality	Time
1st place, gold medalist(s)	Sisay Lemma	Ethiopia	2:01:48
2nd place, silver medalist(s)	Alexander Mutiso	Kenya	2:03:11
3rd place, bronze medalist(s)	Dawit Wolde	Ethiopia	2:03:48
4	Kenenisa Bekele	Ethiopia	2:04:19
5	Gabriel Geay	Tanzania	2:04:33
6	Kibiwott Kandie	Kenya	2:04:48
7	Chalu Deso	Ethiopia	2:05:14
8	Mohamed Esa	Ethiopia	2:05:40
9	Mehdi Frere	France	2:05:43
10	Gashau Ayale	Israel	2:05:46
11	Tariku Novales	Spain	2:05:48
12	Derseh Kindie	Ethiopia	2:05:51
13	Girmaw Amare	Israel	2:05:52
14	Nicolas Navarro	France	2:05:53
15	Haimro Alame	Israel	2:06:04
16	Félix Bour	France	2:06:46
17	Morhad Amdouni	France	2:06:55
18	Shokhrukh Davlatov	Uzbekistan	2:07:02
19	Richard Ringer	Germany	2:07:05
20	Titus Kipruto	Kenya	2:07:22
21	Nekagenet Crippa	Italy	2:07:35
22	Samuel Barata	Portugal	2:07:35
23	Khalid Choukoud	Netherlands	2:07:37
24	Isaac Mpofu	Zimbabwe	2:07:39
25	Alberto González Mindez	Guatemala	2:07:40
26	Benjamin Choquert	France	2:07:42
27	Getaneh Molla	Ethiopia	2:07:45
28	Yago Rojo	Spain	2:07:47
29	Goitom Kifle	Eritrea	2:08:22
30	Haftom Welday	Germany	2:08:24

Elite women's top 30 finishers
Place	Athlete	Nationality	Time
1st place, gold medalist(s)	Worknesh Degefa	Ethiopia	2:15:51
2nd place, silver medalist(s)	Almaz Ayana	Ethiopia	2:16:22
3rd place, bronze medalist(s)	Hiwot Gebrekidan	Ethiopia	2:17:59
4	Celestine Chepchirchir	Kenya	2:20:46
5	Majida Maayouf	Spain	2:21:27
6	Sultan Haydar	Turkey	2:21:27
7	Desi Mokonin	Bahrain	2:22:29
8	Genevieve Gregson	Australia	2:23:08
9	Sofiia Yaremchuk	Italy	2:23:16
10	Isobel Batt-Doyle	Australia	2:23:27
11	Joan Chelimo	Kenya	2:24:16
12	Fabienne Schlumpf	Switzerland	2:24:30
13	Laura Hottenrott	Germany	2:24:32
14	Camilla Richardsson	Finland	2:24:38
15	Mekdes Woldu	France	2:24:44
16	Silvia Patricia Ortiz Morocho	Ecuador	2:24:50
17	Mélody Julien	France	2:25:01
18	Clara Evans	United Kingdom	2:25:04
19	Lily Partridge	United Kingdom	2:25:12
20	Fatima Azzahraa Ouhaddou	Spain	2:25:30
21	Laura Luengo	Spain	2:25:35
22	Susana Cristina Da Silva Godinho	Portugal	2:25:35
23	Moira Stewartová	Czech Republic	2:25:36
24	Eloise Wellings	Australia	2:25:47
25	Manon Trapp	France	2:25:48
26	Aleksandra Lisowska	Poland	2:25:52
27	Camille French	New Zealand	2:26:08
28	Marie Perrier	Mauritius	2:26:19
29	Angelika Mach	Poland	2:26:19
30	María José Pérez	Spain	2:26:42
