= Majida Maayouf =

Moroccan-Spanish marathoner

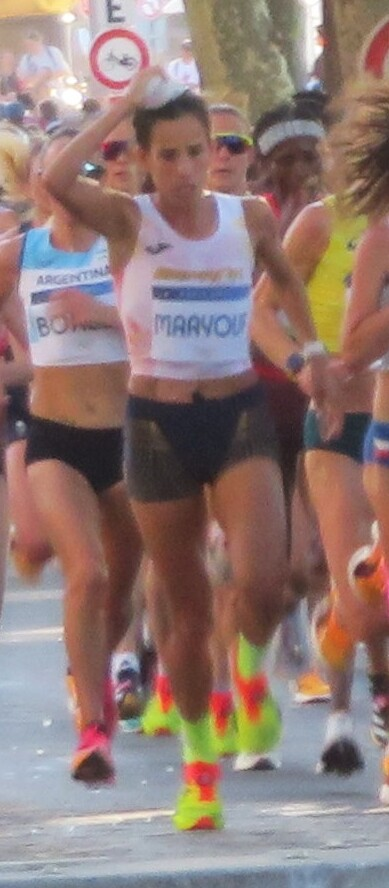
- Maayouf in 2024

Personal information
- Full name: Majida Maayouf Chajra
- Born: 27 April 1989 (age 37) Brarha, Morocco
- Height: 1.65 m (5 ft 5 in)

Sport
- Country: Morocco; Spain
- Sport: Track and field
- Event: Marathon

Achievements and titles
- Olympic finals: 2024 Paris; Marathon (17th)
- Personal best: Marathon: 2:21:01 (2022)
Medal record
Women's athletics
Representing Spain
European Running Championships
Silver medal – second place	2025 Leuven	Marathon

Majida Maayouf Chajra (born 27 April 1989) (Note: Maayouf was 34 years old in 2023) is a Moroccan-Spanish marathoner and cross country runner. She is the Spanish national record holder in the marathon. She competed in the women's marathon at the 2024 Olympic Games in Paris and at the 2024 World Cross Country Championships in Belgrade. She won the silver medal in the marathon and gold in the team competition at the 2025 European Running Championships in Belgium.

== Career ==
In 2021, she achieved the minimum standard time in Siena, Italy to compete in the Tokyo Olympic Games; however, her Spanish naturalisation process was incomplete and she was unable to compete. In 2022, she set a personal best 2:21:01 at the Valencia Marathon. The following year, she gained Spanish citizenship. On 3 December 2023, she ran a Spanish national record for the marathon of 2:21:27 at the Valencia Marathon in Spain.

She competed for Spain at the 2024 World Athletics Cross Country Championships in Belgrade, Serbia on 30 March 2024. She competed in the women's marathon event for Spain at the 2024 Summer Olympics.

In April 2025, she won the silver medal in the marathon at the 2025 European Running Championships in Leuven, Belgium. She finished behind her compatriot Fatima Azzahraa Ouhaddou Nafie in a Spanish one-two, and also won a gold medal in the team championships.

== Personal life ==
Born in Brarha, Morocco, in 1989, Maayouf arrived in Spain in 2011 with a visa to run the Barcelona Marathon. At 22 years-of-age, she settled in the Basque Country, first in Santurtzi, then in Vitoria-Gasteiz, and for the past four years in Agurain. In 2023, Maayouf acquired Spanish nationality. She has a daughter.
