= Stratford-upon-Avon School =

Location
- Alcester Road; Stratford-upon-Avon, Warwickshire, CV37 9DH; England; 52°11′37″N 1°43′12″W

Information
- Type: Academy
- Established: 1939
- Department for Education URN: 137236 Tables
- Ofsted: Reports
- Gender: Co-educational
- Age: 11 to 18
- Website: http://www.stratforduponavonschool.com

Stratford upon Avon School is an academy that educates girls and boys, 11- to 18-year-olds, in Stratford-upon-Avon, Warwickshire, England. Stratford School is a successful non-selective school that offers its students a broad spectrum of GCSE and A level options. Key Stage 3, Key Stage 4 and Key Stage 5.

== Notable former pupils ==
- Simon Gilbert, drummer with the band Suede
- Jack Grundy, cricketer
- Gordon Ramsay, television chef
- James Righton, co-vocalist and keyboard player of Klaxons
- Simon Taylor-Davis, lead guitarist and backing vocalist of Klaxons
- Juliette Thomas, interior designer
