= Juliette Thomas =

British businesswoman

Juliette Suzanne Thomas (born 7 June 1964) is a British businesswoman and interior designer most known for her TV appearances on BBC programme Dragons' Den, and Channel 4 programme Millionaires' Mansions. Thomas is the founder and owner of the eponymous interior business, Juliette's Interiors.

== Early life and education ==
Thomas was born on 7 June 1964 in Solihull. She studied at the Stratford-upon-Avon High School, completing her education in 1992. After she left high school she worked as personal assistant to the town's mayor. She joined Mysis as a sales manager in 1988 and worked there till 1997.

== Career ==
Thomas and her partner separated in 2005. Thomas had a total saving of £1,200, which she used to buy home accessories for selling on eBay. She was successful in selling the items and subsequently launched Juliette's Interiors, an interior design and luxury furniture retail company based in London. Initially the business was online-only, with a website retailing designer furniture and an interior design and lifestyle blog written by Juliette Thomas in an editorial style, offering interior design ideas, inspiration and advice along with industry news and trends.

In 2008 she appeared on BBC TV show Dragons' Den to seek investment for her business. Although her business was praised by the dragons she didn't secure funding on the programme when she stated that she wasn't drawing a salary from her business but was receiving financial help from the government to support her and her children whilst she built up a business. While the Dragons and the public appreciated her, she also received hate mail after her appearance but her number of website visitors rose from 13,000 per month to 10,000 per week following the show. Deborah Meaden visited Juliette on follow-up TV show Dragons' Den on Tour in 2009 to report on how her business was progressing.

Thomas also appeared on the interior design programme, May the Best House Win on ITV in 2011. The next year her company became an Industry Partner of the British Institute of Interior Design.

In 2013 Thomas opened the Juliettes Interiors showroom on the Kings Road in Chelsea, London. She attracted national media and social media attention in 2016 when she was featured on Channel 4 TV documentary Millionaires' Mansions and appeared in the Daily Mirror.

In 2018 Juliettes Interiors’ Provence Villa won the highest-scoring 5 Star award in the prestigious European Property Awards for the Best Interior Design of a Private Residence in France.

In 2021 Juliette Thomas appeared on Series 1 - Episode 6 of the ITV Television show Family Diaries.
