= Laura Méndez Esquer =

Spanish athlete

Laura Mèndez
Personal information
- Full name: Laura Mèndez Esquer
- Nationality: Spanish
- Born: 6 November 1988 (age 37) Valencia, Spain
- Height: 160 cm (5 ft 3 in)
- Weight: 46 kg (101 lb)

Sport
- Sport: Track and Field
- Events: 3000m, 5000m, 10,000m, marathon

Laura Méndez Esquer (born 6 November 1988 in Valencia) is a Spanish long distance runner. She competed at the 2020 Olympic Games.

== Career ==
Mendez is from Almussafes in the Valencian Community, and is a member of Club Atletismo Playas Castellón. She was runner-up in the senior Spanish Indoor Athletics Championships in the 3000 metres in 2015.

She debuted in the half marathon at the 2019 Valencia Half Marathon and said she was pleasantly surprised by her time of 1:13.43. She then finished in fifth place, in 1:14.14, at the Spanish Championships held in Puerto de Sagunto. Running in Barcelona she set a half marathon personal best of 1:13.19. She was selected to represent Spain in the World Athletics Half Marathon Championships in Gdynia, Poland, in 2020, where she ran a time of 1:12:58.

In April 2021, she ran her debut marathon in Enschede, Netherlands and achieved the qualifying standard for the delayed 2020 Olympic Games in Tokyo in her first ever competitive marathon, running 2:29.28, and became the second Spanish woman in history to run under two and a half hours in her debut marathon, after Maria Abel. Mèndez competed in Tokyo but did not finish the Olympic marathon course, after falling ill in hot conditions between the 29th and 30th kilometres.

In May 2022, Mèndez won the Spanish national championship 10k race setting a new national record time of 33.15. She ran 2:39.15 for the marathon at the 2022 European Athletics Championships in Munich, placing 32nd overall.

She was selected for the 2024 European Athletics Championships in Rome in June 2024.

== Achievements ==
Year	Competition	Venue	Position	Event	Notes
Representing Spain
2020	World Half Marathon Championships	Gdynia, Poland	61st	Half marathon	1:12:58
2021	Olympic Games	Sapporo, Japan	-	Marathon	DNF
2022	Ibero-American Championships	Torrevieja, Spain	6th	Half marathon	1:14:51
2022	European Championships	Munich, Germany	32nd	Marathon	2:39:15
2024	European Championships	Rome, Italy	58th	Half marathon	1:16:28
