= Aras Kaya =

Turkish athlete (born 1994)

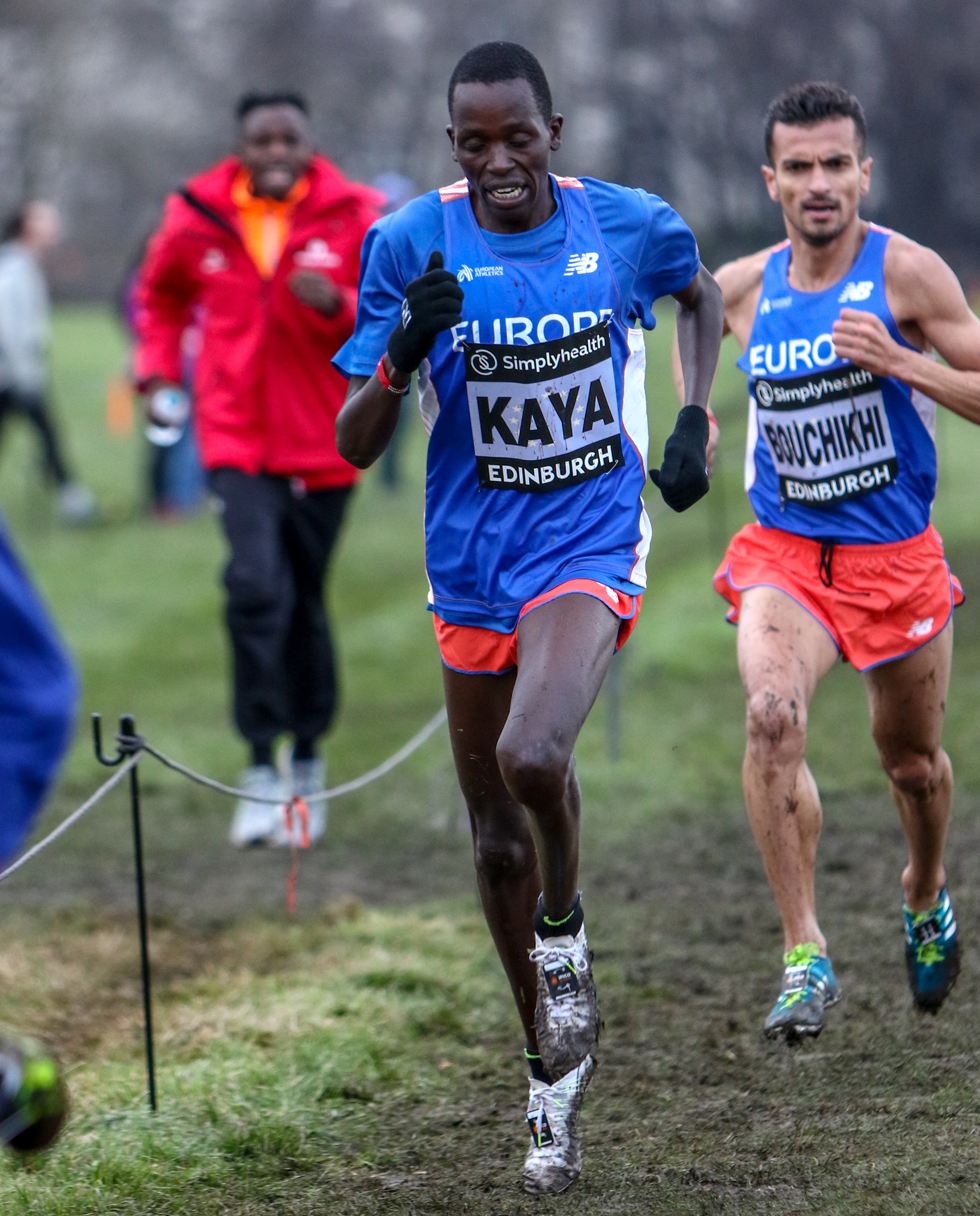
- Kaya at the Great Edinburgh International Cross Country in 2018

Personal information
- Nationality: Turkish, Kenyan
- Born: Amos Kibitok; 4 April 1994 (age 32) Kenya
- Height: 1.83 m (6 ft 0 in)
- Weight: 53 kg (117 lb)

Sport
- Country: Turkey
- Sport: Track and field
- Event: Long-distance running
Medal record
Men's athletics
Representing Turkey
European Championships
| Silver medal – second place | 2016 Amsterdam | 3000 m s'chase |
Balkan Championships
| Gold medal – first place | 2019 Pravets | 3000 m s'chase |
World Cross Country Championships
| Bronze medal – third place | 2017 Kampala | Mixed relay |
European Cross Country Championships
| Gold medal – first place | 2016 Chia | Senior race |
| Gold medal – first place | 2017 Šamorín | Team |
| Gold medal – first place | 2018 Tilburg | Team |
| Gold medal – first place | 2019 Lisbon | Senior race |
| Silver medal – second place | 2021 Dublin | Senior race |
| Bronze medal – third place | 2016 Chia | Team |
| Bronze medal – third place | 2018 Tilburg | Senior race |

Aras Kaya (born Amos Kibitok on 4 April 1994 in Kenya) is a Kenyan-born, Turkish long-distance runner. He won the silver medal in the 3000 metres steeplechase at the 2016 European Athletics Championships. Kaya earned four individual medals at the European Cross Country Championships, including two golds.

He transferred his international representation from Kenya to Turkey in July 2016.

In December 2022, Kaya was issued with a three-year ban by the Athletics Integrity Unit after admitting to an anti-doping rule violation after testing positive for erythropoietin (EPO). All his results from 25 September 2022 onwards were disqualified.

== Achievements ==
=== Competition record ===
Representing Turkey
| Year | Competition | Venue | Position | Event | Notes |
|---|---|---|---|---|---|
| 2016 | European Championships | Amsterdam, Netherlands | 9th | 5000 m | 13:47.42 |
| 2016 | European Championships | Amsterdam, Netherlands | 2nd | 3000 m s'chase | 8:29.91 |
| 2016 | Olympic Games | Rio de Janeiro, Brazil | 21st (h) | 3000 m s'chase | 8:32.35 |
| 2016 | European Cross Country Championships | Chia, Italy | 1st | XC 9.94 km | 27:39 |
| 2016 | European Cross Country Championships | Chia, Italy | 3rd | Team | 38 pts |
| 2017 | European Indoor Championships | Belgrade, Serbia | 12th | 3000 m | 8:16.36 |
| 2017 | World Cross Country Championships | Kampala, Uganda | 3rd | Mixed relay | 22:37 |
| 2017 | Islamic Solidarity Games | Baku, Azerbaijan | 3rd | 3000 m s'chase | 8:32.68 |
| 2017 | European 10,000m Cup | Minsk, Belarus | 4th | 10,000 m | 29:03.13 |
| 2017 | European 10,000m Cup | Minsk, Belarus | 4th | Team | 1:30:16.37 |
| 2017 | European Athletics Team Championships First League | Vaasa, Finland | 7th | 3000 m s'chase | 8:50.09 |
| 2017 | European Cross Country Championships | Šamorín, Slovakia | 7th | XC 10.18 km | 30:14 |
| 2017 | European Cross Country Championships | Šamorín, Slovakia | 1st | Team | 17 pts |
| 2018 | Mediterranean Games | Tarragona, Spain | 10th | 3000 m s'chase | 8:59.48 |
| 2018 | European Championships | Berlin, Germany | – | 10,000 m | DNF |
| 2018 | European Cross Country Championships | Tilburg, Netherlands | 3rd | XC 10.3 km | 28:56 |
| 2018 | European Cross Country Championships | Tilburg, Netherlands | 1st | Team | 14 pts |
| 2019 | World Cross Country Championships | Aarhus, Denmark | 26th | XC 10.24 km | 33:25 |
| 2019 | European 10,000m Cup | London, United Kingdom | 9th | 10,000 m | 28:21.24 SB |
| 2019 | European Athletics Team Championships First League | Sandnes, Norway | 2nd | 5000 m | 13:53.95 SB |
| 2019 | Balkan Championships | Pravets, Bulgaria | 1st | 3000 m s'chase | 8:39.35 |
| 2019 | European Cross Country Championships | Lisbon, Portugal | 1st | XC 10.3 km | 30:10 |
| 2019 | European Cross Country Championships | Lisbon, Portugal | 4th | Team | 50 pts |
| 2020 | World Half Marathon Championships | Gdynia, Poland | 24th | Half marathon | 1:00:51 PB |
| 2020 | World Half Marathon Championships | Gdynia, Poland | 11th | Team | 3:06:54 |
| 2021 | European Cross Country Championships | Dublin, Ireland | 2nd | XC 10 km | 30:29 |
| 2022 | European 10,000m Cup | Pacé, France | 3rd | 10,000 m | 27:58.08 SB |
| 2022 | European 10,000m Cup | Pacé, France | 6th | Team | 1:25:44.12 |
| 2022 | Mediterranean Games | Oran, Algeria | 4th | 5000 m | 13:44.67 |
| 2022 | Islamic Solidarity Games | Konya, Turkey | 4th | 5000 m | 13:56.90 |
| 2022 | Islamic Solidarity Games | Konya, Turkey | 4th | 10,000 m | 28:34.71 |
| 2022 | European Championships | Munich, Germany | 16th | 10,000 m | 28:23.77 |

=== National titles ===
- Turkish Athletics Championships
  - 5000 metres: 2020

=== Personal bests ===
- 3000 metres – 7:57.67 (Bursa 2020)
  - 3000 metres indoor – 7:54.63 (Istanbul 2017)
- 5000 metres – 13:23.91 (Cheboksary 2015)
  - 5000 metres indoor – 13:31.85 (Moscow 2015)
- 10,000 metres – 27:48.53 (Mersin 2015)
- 3000 m s'chase – 8:29.91 (Amsterdam 2016)

Road

- 10 kilometres – 29:20 (Herzogenaurach 2022)
- Half marathon – 1:00:51 (Gdynia 2020)
