= Jack Grundy (cricketer) =

English cricketer (born 1994)

Personal information
- Full name: Jack Oliver Grundy
- Born: 25 June 1994 (age 32); Warwick, Warwickshire, England
- Batting: Right-handed
- Bowling: Left-arm medium-fast

Domestic team information
- Years: Team
- 2015–2017: Oxford MCCU

Career statistics
Competition	First-class
Matches	6
Runs scored	126
Batting average	18.00
100s/50s	–/1
Top score	53
Balls bowled	762
Wickets	11
Bowling average	39.36
5 wickets in innings	–
10 wickets in match	–
Best bowling	3/41
Catches/stumpings	1/–
- Source: Cricinfo, 16 July 2020

Jack Oliver Grundy (born 25 June 1994) is an English former first-class cricketer.

Grundy was born at Warwick and was educated at Stratford-upon-Avon High School, before going up to Oxford Brookes University. While studying at Oxford Brookes, he played first-class cricket for Oxford MCCU from 2015–17, making six appearances. (Note: Oxford MCCU differed from Oxford University Cricket Club in that it was open to students at Oxford Brookes University, whereas Oxford University Cricket Club is exclusively for students of the constituent colleges of the University of Oxford.) He scored 126 runs in his six matches, at an average of 18.00 and a high score of 53. With his left-arm medium-fast bowling, he took 11 wickets at a bowling average of 39.36 and best figures of 3 for 41.
