= Fatima Ouhaddou =

Spanish athlete (born 1993)

Personal information
- Nationality: Moroccan (former); Spanish (current)
- Born: Fatima Azzahraa Ouhaddou Nafie; 30 August 1993 (age 32) Khemisset, Morocco

Sport
- Sport: Athletics
- Event: Long-distance running

Achievements and titles
- Personal bests: Half marathon: 1:09:09 (2025); Marathon: 2:24:05 (2024)
Medal record
Women's athletics
Representing Spain
European Athletics Championships
| Bronze medal – third place | 2026 Birmingham | Marathon team |
| Bronze medal – third place | 2024 Rome | Half marathon team |
European Running Championships
| Gold medal – first place | 2025 Leuven | Marathon |

Fatima Azzahraa Ouhaddou Nafie (born 30 August 1993) is a long-distance runner. Born in Morocco, she has competed for Spain since 2022. In 2025, she won the marathon at the European Running Championships in Belgium.

== Career ==
She started running when she was 20 years-old but worked full-time and could only run when time allowed. She began to focus on athletics more seriously in November 2021, when she began to be coached by Johny Ouriaghli. She set a personal best in the half marathon of 1:10:37 on October 23, 2022, whilst competing in Valencia, Spain.

On April 16, she made her marathon debut and finished in fourth place in the Rotterdam Marathon in a time of 2:26:44, which was the third-fastest Spanish in history after Marta Galimany and Meritxell Soler. She was subsequently selected to compete for Spain in the marathon at the 2023 World Athletics Championships in Budapest, Hungary.

In June 2024, she finished in 14th place in the half marathon at the 2024 European Athletics Championships in Rome, Italy, with a time of 1:11:14. She also won the bronze medal in the team competition at the Championships.

She set a new half marathon personal best of 1:09:09 competing in China, in February 2025. In April 2025, she won the marathon at the 2025 European Running Championships in Leuven, Belgium. She finished ahead of her compatriot Majida Maayouf in a Spanish one-two, and also won a gold medal in the team championships.

Ouhaddou was the leading Spanish finisher in fifth place overall in 2:24:16, at the Seville Marathon in February 2026. On 16 August, she ran 2:30:37 and finished in fifteenth place in the marathon at the 2026 European Championships in Birmingham, which helped Spain win the team bronze medal.

== International competitions ==
| Year | Competition | Venue | Position | Event | Notes |
Representing Spain
| 2023 | World Championships | Budapest, Hungary | — | Marathon | DNF |
| 2024 | European Championships | Rome, Italy | 13th | Half marathon | 1:11:14 |
| 2025 | European Running Championships | Leuven, Belgium | 1st | Marathon | 2:27:14 |
| 2025 | World Championships | Tokyo, Japan | 24th | Marathon | 2:35:05 |
| 2026 | European Championships | Birmingham, United Kingdom | 15th | Marathon | 2:30:37 |

== Personal life ==
She was born in Khemisset, Morocco but moved with her family at the age of eight years-old to Casariche, Seville. She is married to Brahim, they have one daughter. Brahim has acted as her coach. They have lived in Córdoba, Spain since 2015. She had dual nationality for ten years before she received permission from World Athletics to compete as a Spaniard in October 2022.
