= Tadesse Abraham =

Swiss long-distance runner (born 1982)

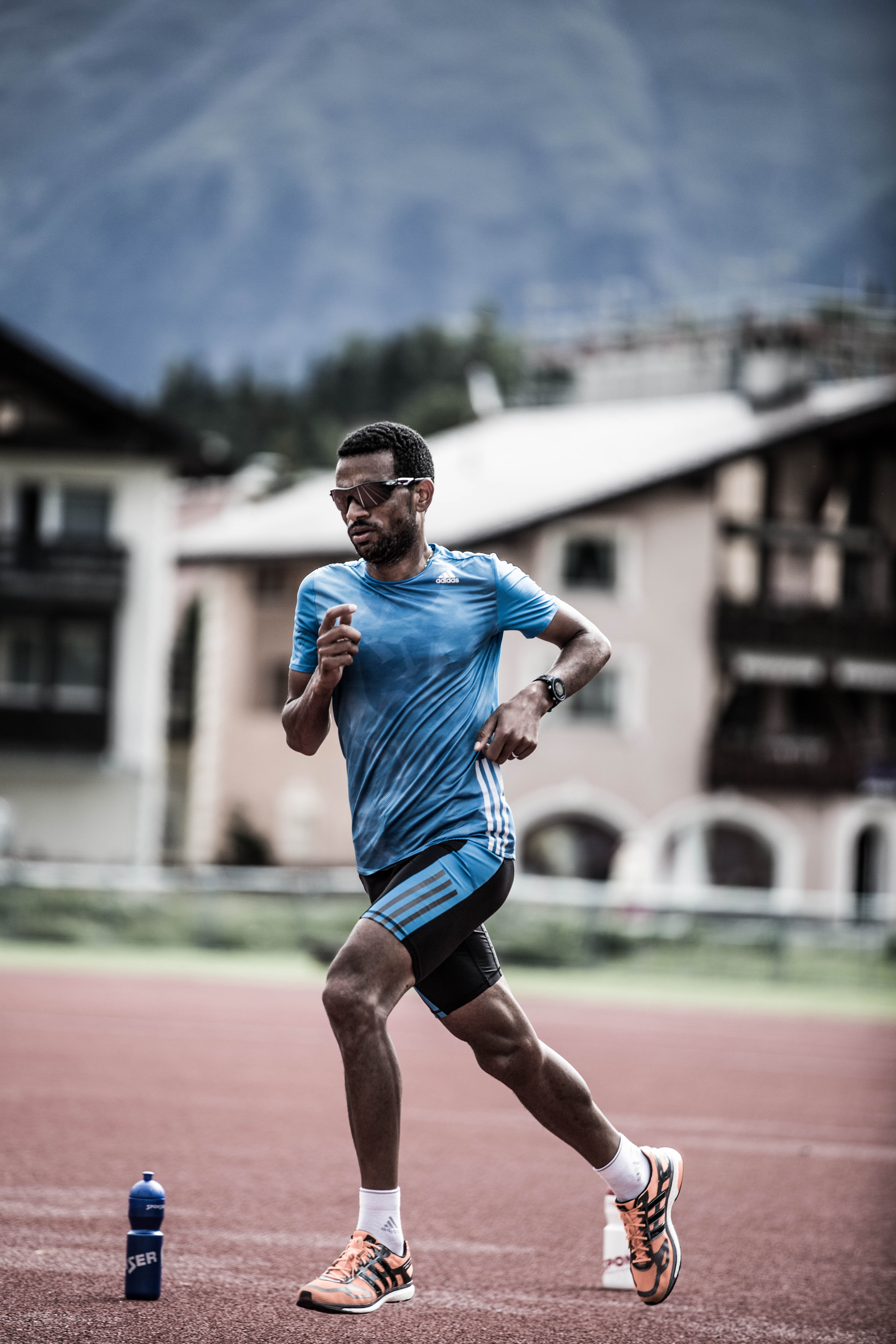
- Tadesse Abraham in training camp in St. Moritz, 2014

Personal information
- Full name: Tadesse Abraham
- Born: 12 August 1982 (age 44) Asmara, Ethiopia
- Height: 178 cm (5 ft 10 in)
- Weight: 61 kg (134 lb)
- Website: www.tadesse-abraham.ch

Sport
- Country: Switzerland
- Sport: Track and field
- Event: Marathon
- Club: On
- Turned pro: 2001

Achievements and titles
- Personal bests: Half marathon: 59:53 (København 2022); Marathon: 2:04:40 (Valencia 2024) NR
Medal record
Representing Switzerland
European Championships
Gold medal – first place	2016 Amsterdam	Half Marathon
Silver medal – second place	2018 Berlin	Marathon

Tadesse Abraham (sometimes spelt Tadesse Abrham; Tigrinya: ታደሰ ኣብርሃም; born 12 August 1982) is a Swiss long-distance runner who specialises in the marathon. He was the 2016 European half marathon champion and finished seventh at the 2016 Olympics. He won a silver medal in the marathon at the 2018 European Championships. He also held two Swiss titles for the 10,000 metres in 2020 as well as the marathon in 2022.

== Early life and background ==
Tadesse Abraham was born on 12 August 1982 in rural Asmara as the son of a farmer. Initially, he showed interest in cycling and wanted to be a cyclist rather than a runner growing up. Eritrea has a long tradition in cycling, which is its most popular sport and was introduced by the Italians when Eritrea was a still a colony. Bicycles are rampant in Asmara, with many people, no matter their age or gender, using them daily for recreation and as a method of transportation.

However, Tadesse fell and broke his bike. His parents could not afford to replace it, so he turned to running instead at age 15 after having to walk up to 20 kilometres regularly to reach school punctually. He developed his skills this way and became the fastest in his school. His teacher encouraged him to continue.

His professional career started in 2001. He represented his home country of Eritrea until the 2004 IAAF World Cross Country Championships in Brussels, Belgium on 21 March. Then, he escaped from the team with a colleague and headed directly to Geneva, Switzerland where he arrived as a refugee seeking asylum at the young age of 21. Political problems in Eritrea pushed him to permanently leave the country in search of a better life. He elected to settle in Switzerland because of its neutrality.

=== 2004–2014: Coming to Switzerland ===
Tadesse remembers the first few years being challenging due to the fact that he spoke English as opposed to the Swiss German language and knew no one around the area. He was alone in a foreign land with little to no possibilities. Everything was different to him, including the food and culture. But, eventually, he integrated well to life in Switzerland. Prior to his naturalisation, his running career stagnated somewhat as he was stationed at a refugee camp that rendered him incapable of going out for three months.

He joined the athletics club LC Uster where he trains currently. He ran in several small races throughout the years, both locally in Switzerland and abroad once he finally received permission to travel in 2007. He participated in the Berlin Half Marathon on 5 April 2009, finished in 11th place, and clocked an impressive time of 1:01:25. He entered his first marathon in Zürich on 26 April 2009 and won immediately. Following his victory, he took part in the 2010 Berlin Marathon on 26 September and finished in seventh place. His next marathon win would not be until the Zürich Marathon again on 7 April 2013.

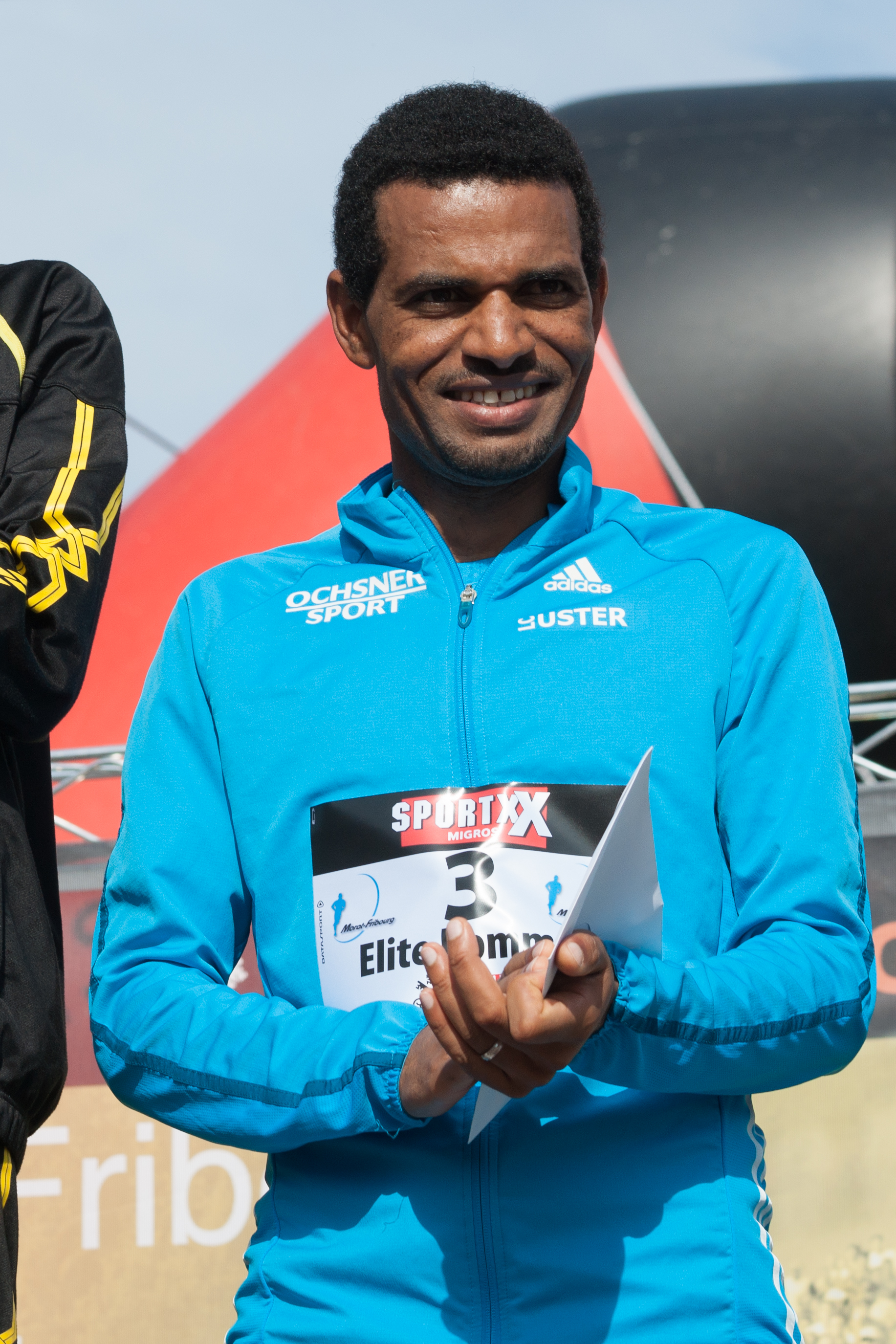
Tadesse at the Morat Fribourg in 2014

Tadesse waited 10 years to obtain Swiss citizenship officially in 2014 and began to represent his adopted country from that point on at international competitions. His career rose exponentially to new heights upon his return to championship racing after a 10-year dormant period. His first event was right in Zürich, where he finished ninth respectably, at the 2014 European Championships on 17 August. He expressed pride in "wearing the [Swiss] shirt and doing something for [his] country".

Despite his struggles getting accustomed to Switzerland, Tadesse priorities giving back to charitable causes. He believes that "to help the refugee means there is humanity". He is cognisant of the harsh realities refugees may experience, having dealt with the exact issues himself in the past. So, he works closely with The Human Safety Net Switzerland (THSN), a foundation of the insurance company Generali Switzerland.

THSN supports vulnerable people, such as migrants and refugees, on the THSN Refugee Team realise their dreams. The team of about 20 diverse athletes benefits from the assistance. They can potentially become the best in their sport or secure apprenticeships in whatever area they choose. Tadesse serves as the charity's ambassador. Additionally, he helps coach athletes whenever he has the time and shares ideas with the coaching party at the charity.

== Career ==
=== 2015–2017 ===
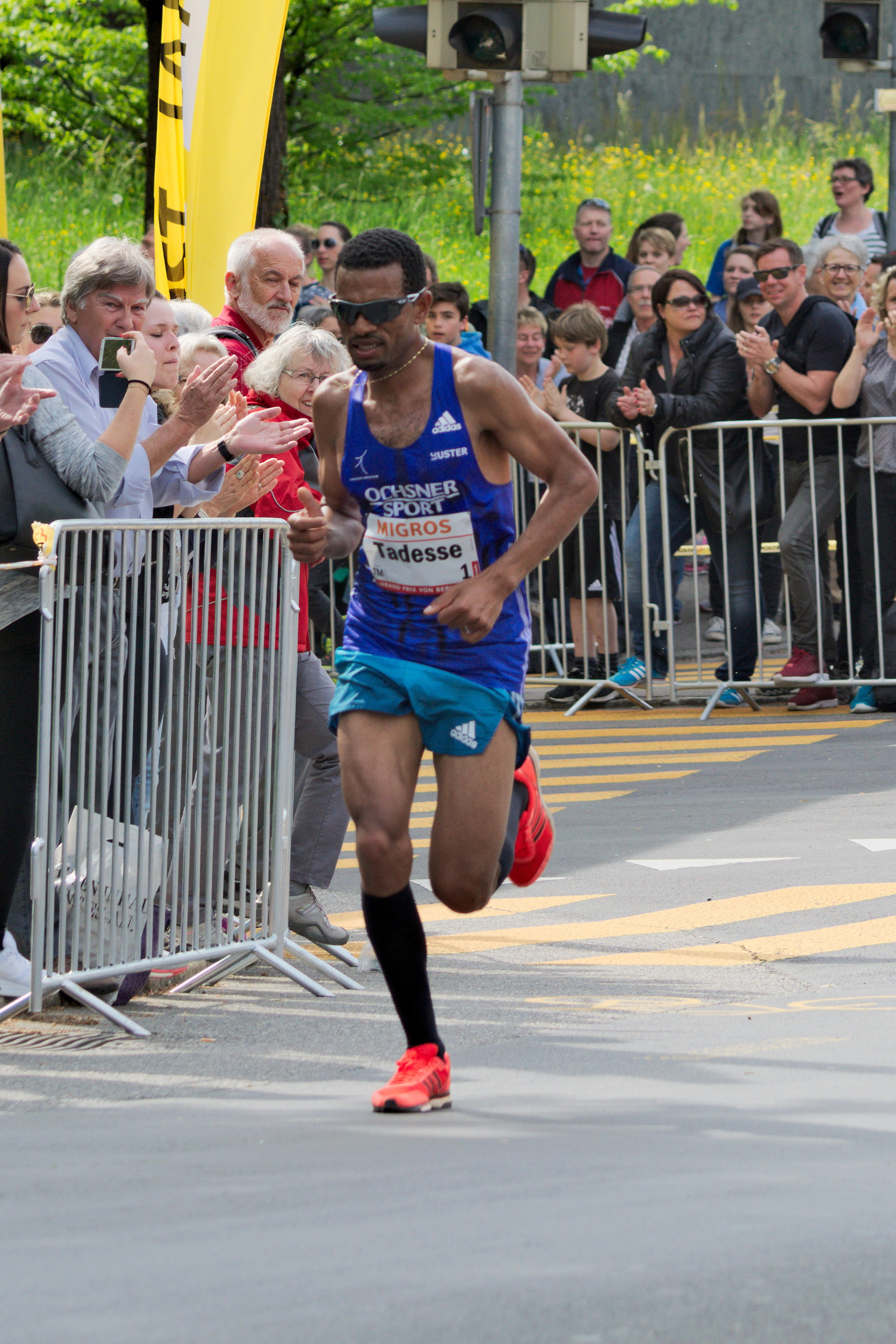
Tadesse at the Grand Prix in Bern in 2015

Tadesse Abraham competed in the marathon event at the 2015 World Championships in Beijing. In 2016, he finished seventh in the marathon at the Olympics in Rio de Janeiro. In the same year, he won gold in the half marathon at the European Championships in Amsterdam and improved the Swiss national record of Viktor Röthlin, set in 2007, to 2:06:40 at the Seoul Marathon. Due to an injury, Tadesse missed most of the 2017 season, including the World Championships in London. He made his marathon comeback at the New York City Marathon in November, where he finished fifth.

=== 2018–present ===
He won silver in the marathon at the 2018 European Championships in Berlin and finished strongly in ninth place at the 2019 World Championships in Doha. He went to the 2020 World Half Marathon Championships in Gdynia and finished 51st. Although he attended the delayed 2020 Olympics in Tokyo, he did not make it to the finish line. He won the Zürich Marathon 10 April 2022. During the 2023 Berlin Marathon, Tadesse finished in 11th place and lowered the Swiss marathon record down to 2:05:10. His performance marked a masters world record.

== Personal life ==
Tadesse is married to Senait, who is 7 years older than him. Similarly, she is a fellow Eritrean who was brought up in Switzerland. She runs recreationally and is employed in the financial sector. They met in 2008 at a road run in Meinier while she was preparing for the New York City Marathon. Her friend, Joseph Bago, introduced them. They married three years later in 2011 and had a son together, Elod. He enjoys football and running, especially the 1000 metres. When Tadesse was injured in 2017, his family supported him and remained by his side the entire time while he recovered.

Tadesse occasionally uses the nickname "Tade". He tested positive for COVID-19 in March 2021, just days before he was supposed to fly from a training camp in Ethiopia to Geneva for the Belp Marathon.

== Achievements ==
Information from his World Athletics profile unless otherwise noted.

=== International competitions ===
Year	Competition	Venue	Position	Event	Time	Notes
Representing Eritrea
2003	World Cross Country Championships	Lausanne, Switzerland	26th	U20 race	24:14	
2004	World Cross Country Championships	Brussels, Belgium	58th	U20 race	27:07	
Representing Switzerland
2014	European Championships	Zürich, Switzerland	9th	Marathon	2:15:05	
2015	European 10,000m Cup	Cagliari, Italy	4th	10,000 m	28:41.37	
2015	European Team Championships First League	Heracleion, Greece	5th	5,000 m	15:21:86	
2015	World Championships	Beijing, China	19th	Marathon	2:19:25	
2016	European Championships	Amsterdam, Netherlands	1st	Half marathon	1:02:03	
2016	Olympic Games	Rio de Janeiro, Brazil	7th	Marathon	2:11:42	
2018	European Championships	Berlin, Germany	2nd	Marathon	2:11:24	
2019	World Championships	Doha, Qata	9th	Marathon	2:11:58	
2020	World Half Marathon Championships	Gdynia, Poland	51st	Half marathon	1:02:46	SB
2021	Olympic Games	Tokyo, Japan	—	Marathon	DNF	
2022	European 10,000m Cup	Pacé, Ille-et-Vilaine, France	—	10,000 m	DNF	
World Marathon Major
2010	Berlin Marathon	Berlin, Germany	7th	Marathon	2:09:24	
2017	New York City Marathon	New York City, United States	5th	Marathon	2:12:01	
2023	Berlin Marathon	Berlin, Germany	11th	Marathon	2:05:10	PB

=== National titles ===
- Swiss Athletics Championships (2)
  - 10,000 metres: 2020
  - Marathon: 2022

== See also ==
- Sport in Eritrea
- List of Swiss records in athletics
- Switzerland at the Olympics
