= Dibaba =

Dibaba is an Oromo name. Notable people with the surname include:

- Tirunesh Dibaba, Ethiopian long-distance runner who has achieved multiple Olympic and World Championships gold medals and world records. She is the middle sister of Ejegayehu and Genzebe Dibaba.
- Ejegayehu Dibaba, Ethiopian long-distance runner and 2004 Olympic silver medallist at 10,000 meters. She is the older sister of Tirunesh and Genzebe Dibaba.
- Genzebe Dibaba, Ethiopian long-distance runner and 2015 1,500 meter World Champions gold medalist. She is the younger sister of Tirunesh and Ejegayehu Dibaba.
- Mare Dibaba, Ethiopian marathon runner and 2015 World Championships marathon winner.
