= Millionaires Mansions =

Millionaires Mansions is a TV documentary produced by BAFTA-winning Indus Films and shown on British television Channel 4 in 2016.

The documentary followed luxury interior design companies, such as Juliettes Interiors, when working on high-end projects for high net worth individuals and their homes.
