= Brarha =

- commune
- Interactive map of Brarha
- Country: Morocco
- Region: Taza-Al Hoceima-Taounate
- Province: Taza

Population (2004)
  - Total: 9,065
- Time zone: UTC+0 (GMT)

Brarha is a commune in the Taza Province of the Taza-Al Hoceima-Taounate administrative region of Morocco. At the time of the 2004 census, the commune had a total population of 9,065 people living in 1,349 households.
