= Calli Thackery =

Olympic English runner

Calli Hauger-Thackery
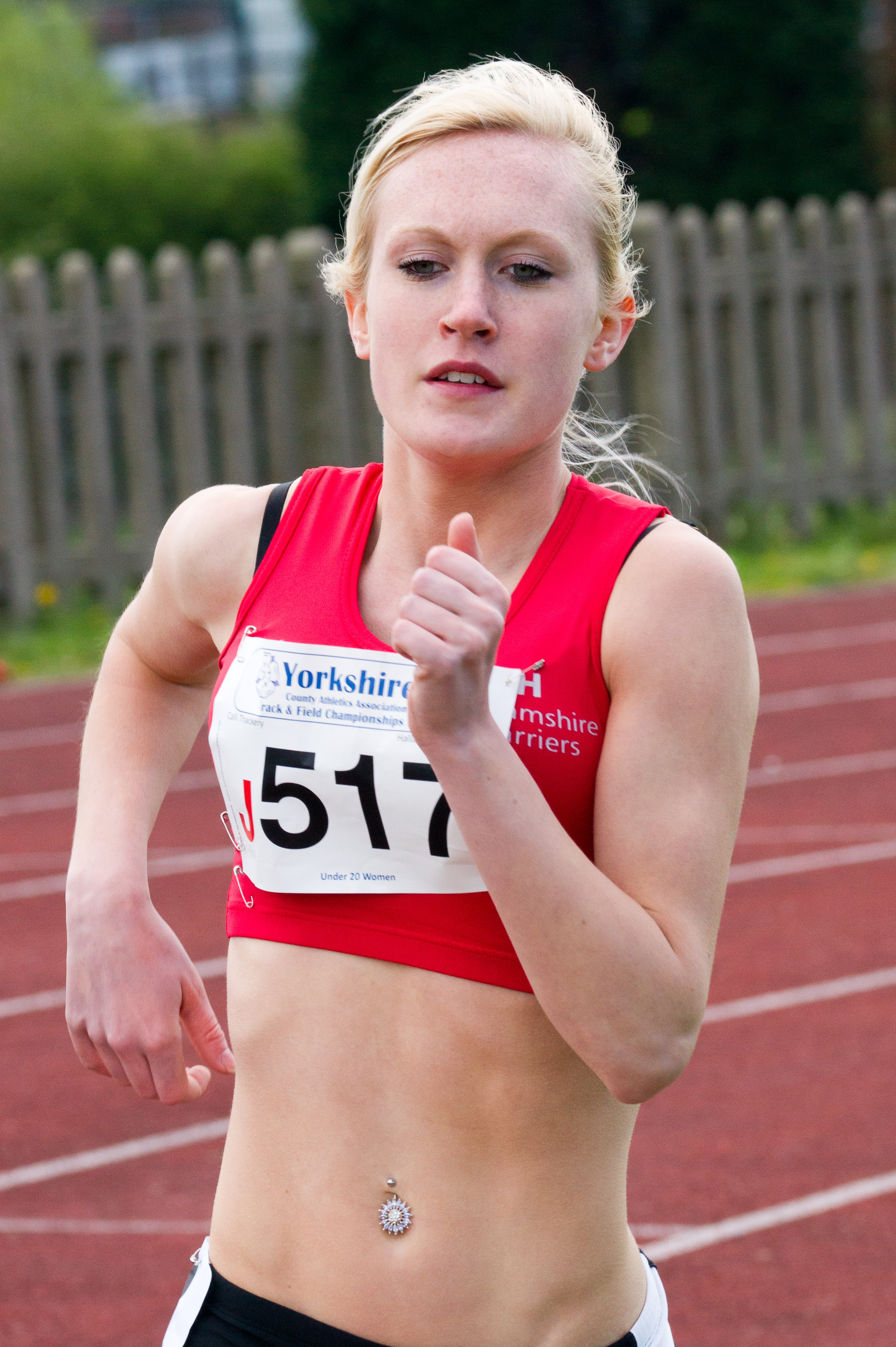
- Thackery in 2012

Personal information
- Nationality: British (English)
- Born: Calli Thackery; 9 January 1993 (age 33) Yorkshire, England
- Home town: Flagstaff, Arizona
- Height: 5 ft 4 in (163 cm)

Sport
- Country: England
- Sport: Athletics
- Events: 5000 metres, 10,000 metres, marathon
- University team: New Mexico Lobos
- Club: Melbourne Track Club; Hallamshire Harriers
- Turned pro: 2017
- Partner: Nick Hauger
Medal record
Women's athletics
Representing United Kingdom
European Championships
Gold medal – first place	2024 Rome	Half marathon - team
Bronze medal – third place	2024 Rome	Half marathon - individual

Calli Hauger-Thackery (née Thackery; born 9 January 1993) is an English international athlete. She was bronze medalist in the women's half Marathon at the 2024 European Athletics Championships, and a member of the gold medal winning team in the 2024 European Half-Marathon Cup, held at the same time.

She represented Great Britain at the 2024 Paris Olympics and England at the 2022 Commonwealth Games.

== Career ==
Hauger-Thackery finished fifth in the 5,000m at the 2015 European U23 Championships.

In June 2022 she recorded a personal best of 15:06.26 for the 5,000 metres, placing her 17th on the all-time UK list. Representing England, she came 10th in the 5,000 metres at the 2022 Commonwealth Games in Birmingham. A few weeks later she finished sixth in the 5,000 metres at the 2022 European Athletics Championships in Munich, Germany.

Competing in her first marathon, Hauger-Thackery won the McKirdy Micro Marathon in New York, on 14 October 2023, in a time of 2:22:17, achieving the Olympic qualifying standard in the process.

In February 2024, she was named in the Great Britain marathon team for the Paris Olympics.

At the 2024 European Athletics Championships in Rome, Italy, Hauger-Thackery took part in the half-marathon, winning an individual bronze medal and gold in the team event.

She represented Great Britain in the marathon at the 2024 Summer Olympics but did not finish the race.

Calli Hauger-Thackery won the 2024 California International Marathon in a course record time of 2:24:28.

== Personal life ==
Hauger-Thackery was born in Yorkshire to mother Rachel, a county level sprinter, and father Carl Thackery, a professional long distance runner who placed third to lead Team GB to a bronze team medal at the 1993 IAAF World Half Marathon Championships. She was educated at the University of New Mexico, earned 6 NCAA Division I All-American awards and is married to American marathon runner Nick Hauger. Calli Thackery helped the New Mexico Lobos to 4 Mountain West Conference team championship titles and the 2015 NCAA Division I cross country championships team title.

RepresentingUniversity of New Mexico '13-'17
Year	Venue	Position	Event	Time
Cross Country Championships
2013 Mountain West Conference Cross Country Championship	United States Air Force Academy the Eisenhower Golf Club	8th	6 km	21:55.8
2013 Mountain West Conference Cross Country Championship	United States Air Force Academy the Eisenhower Golf Club	(gold) 1st place Team	6 km	31 points
2013 NCAA Division I cross country championships	Terre Haute, Indiana	67th	6 km	21:04.0
2013 NCAA Division I cross country championships	Terre Haute, Indiana	10th place Team	6 km	301 points
2015 Mountain West Conference Cross Country Championship	University of Nevada Reno	7th	6 km	22:55.2
2015 Mountain West Conference Cross Country Championship	University of Nevada Reno	(gold) 1st place Team	6 km	24 points
2015 NCAA Division I cross country championships	Terre Haute, Indiana	15th	6 km	20:07.3
2015 NCAA Division I cross country championships	Terre Haute, Indiana	(gold) 1st place Team	6 km	49 points
2016 Mountain West Conference Cross Country Championship	Boise State University	2nd	6 km	20:11.3
2016 Mountain West Conference Cross Country Championship	Boise State University	(gold) 1st place Team	6 km	42 points
2016 NCAA Division I cross country championships	Terre Haute, Indiana	28th	6 km	20:17.4
2016 NCAA Division I cross country championships	Terre Haute, Indiana	7th place Team	6 km	310 points
Indoor Track and Field Championships
2015 Mountain West Conference Indoor Track and Field Championship	University of New Mexico	3rd	3000 m	9:47.99
2015 Mountain West Conference Indoor Track and Field Championship	University of New Mexico	4th	5000 m	17:09.95
2015 Mountain West Conference Indoor Track and Field Championship	University of New Mexico	(gold) 1st place Team		149 points
2015 NCAA Division I Indoor Track and Field Championships	Albuquerque, New Mexico	13th	3000 m	9:26.33
2016 Mountain West Conference Indoor Track and Field Championship	University of New Mexico	2nd	Mile	4:45.79
2016 Mountain West Conference Indoor Track and Field Championship	University of New Mexico	4th	3000 m	9:43.36
2016 NCAA Division I Indoor Track and Field Championships	Birmingham, Alabama	6th	3000 m	9:09.36
2016 NCAA Division I Indoor Track and Field Championships	Birmingham, Alabama	12th	DMR	11:30.67
2017 Mountain West Conference Indoor Track and Field Championship	University of New Mexico	2nd	3000 m	9:40.09
2017 Mountain West Conference Indoor Track and Field Championship	University of New Mexico	2nd	DMR	11:29.04
Outdoor Track and Field Championships
2015 Mountain West Conference Outdoor Track and Field Championship	San Diego State University	1st	1500 m	4:29.97
2015 Mountain West Conference Outdoor Track and Field Championship	San Diego State University	2nd	5000 m	16:08.84
2015 NCAA Division I Outdoor Track and Field Championships	University of Oregon	6th	5000 m	15:47.15
2016 Mountain West Conference Outdoor Track and Field Championship	California State University, Fresno	1st	10,000 m	34:30.24
2016 NCAA Division I Outdoor Track and Field Championships	University of Oregon	22nd	5000 m	DNF
