= Anne Luijten =

Dutch athlete (born 1994)

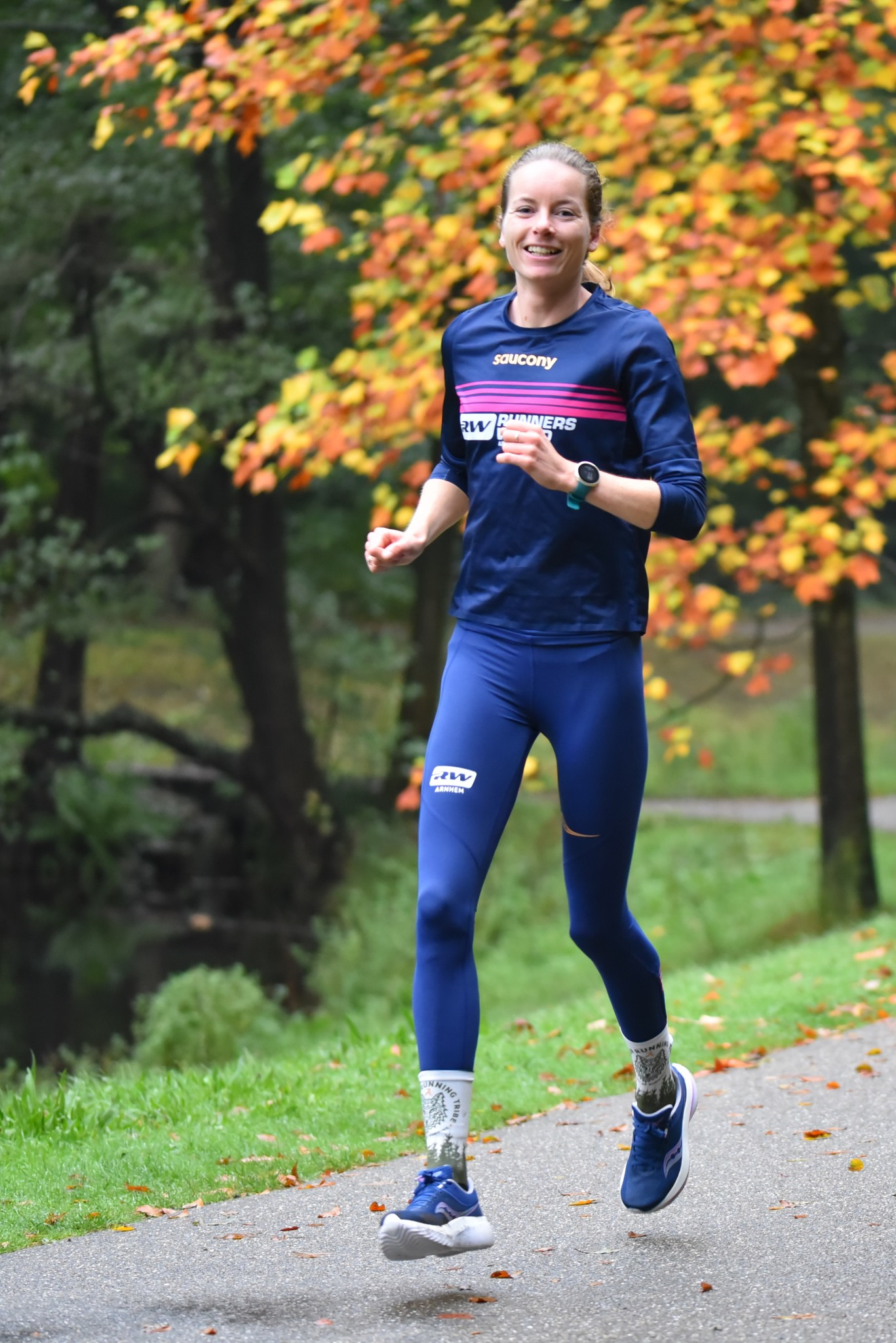
- Anne Luijten in 2023.

Personal information
- Nationality: Dutch
- Born: 14 April 1994 (age 32)

Sport
- Sport: Athletics
- Event: Long-distance running

Achievements and titles
- Personal best(s): 10,000m: 33:33.40 (London, 2023); Half marathon: 1:10:39 (The Hague, 2024); Marathon: 2:26:36 (Amsterdam, 2023)

Anne Luijten (born 14 April 1994) is a Dutch long-distance runner. She has won Dutch national titles in the marathon and half marathon and competed in the marathon at the 2024 Olympic Games and the half marathon at the 2024 European Athletics Championships.

== Biography ==
Luijten won the Dutch national title in the marathon with the highest place finish by a Dutch athlete at the 2023 Rotterdam Marathon in April 2023, running 2:30:59; a personal best of over 5 minutes. Later that year she also became Dutch champion in the half marathon with the highest Dutch finish at the 2023 Breda Half Marathon, in 1:13:26. On 15 October 2023, she ran a personal best of 2:26:36 at the Amsterdam Marathon.

Luijten ran a half marathon personal best of 1:10:39 at the 2024 NN CPC Run The Hague Half Marathon in Den Haag. She won the Dutch national title again with the highest place finish by a Dutch athlete at the 2024 Rotterdam Marathon in April 2024, running 2:28:47. She competed in the half marathon at the 2024 European Athletics Championships in Rome, Italy. She competed for the Netherlands at the 2024 Olympic Games in Paris, France.

Luijten was the highest Dutch finisher at the Rotterdam Marathon again in April 2025. She was selected for the Dutch team for the marathon at the 2025 World Athletics Championships in Tokyo, Japan. She claimed the Dutch national title once again on 19 October 2025, as the highest Dutch finisher at the Amsterdam Marathon.

== Personal life ==
Luijten is from Rijswijk, South Holland, in the Netherlands, and studied sociology at the University of Portland in the United States. She was later based in Arnhem, where she worked as a Management Advisor. She married in 2023. She continued to compete even when 25 weeks pregnant, winning a 5k race in The Hague in March 2026.
