= Susana Santos =

Portuguese runner (born 1992)

Personal information
- Full name: Susana Godinho Santos
- Born: 5 July 1992 (age 34) Oliveira do Douro, Vila Nova de Gaia, Portugal

Sport
- Country: Portugal
- Sport: Athletics
- Events: Long-distance running, cross country running
- Club: R.D. Águeda

Susana Godinho Santos (born 5 July 1992) is a Portuguese long-distance runner. She represents Recreio Desportivo de Águeda at club level.

Santos represented Portugal in the women's marathon at the 2024 Summer Olympics, where she finished in 57th place.

She is currently the eighth fastest Portuguese woman on the marathon.

== Achievements ==
Information from World Athletics profile.

=== Personal bests ===
Type	Event	Time	Date	Place
Track	3000 metres	9:23.17	1 March 2020	Pombal, Portugal
Track	5000 metres	16:16.73	25 May 2024	Maia, Portugal
Track	10,000 metres	33:23.31	12 April 2019	Burjassot, Spain
Road	5 km	16:58	21 May 2017	Lisbon, Portugal
Road	10 km	34:01	24 September 2023	Viana do Castelo, Portugal
Road	15 km	52:43	3 November 2019	Porto, Portugal
Road	Half marathon	1:10:47	27 October 2024	Valencia, Spain
Road	Marathon	2:24:46	1 December 2024	Valencia, Spain
