= Fadouwa Ledhem =

French long-distance runner

Personal information
- Born: 28 September 1987 (age 38) France

Sport
- Country: France
- Event: Long-distance running

Fadouwa Ledhem (born 28 September 1987) is a French long-distance runner. In 2018, she competed in the women's half marathon at the 2018 IAAF World Half Marathon Championships held in Valencia, Spain and she finished in 102nd place. She also competed in the women's half marathon at the 2018 Mediterranean Games held in Tarragona, Spain. She finished in 6th place.

In 2018, she won the French Half Marathon Championships held in Saint-Omer, France.

In 2019, she competed in the women's event at the 2019 European 10,000m Cup held in London, United Kingdom.
