= Fabienne Königstein =

German long-distance runner (born 1992)

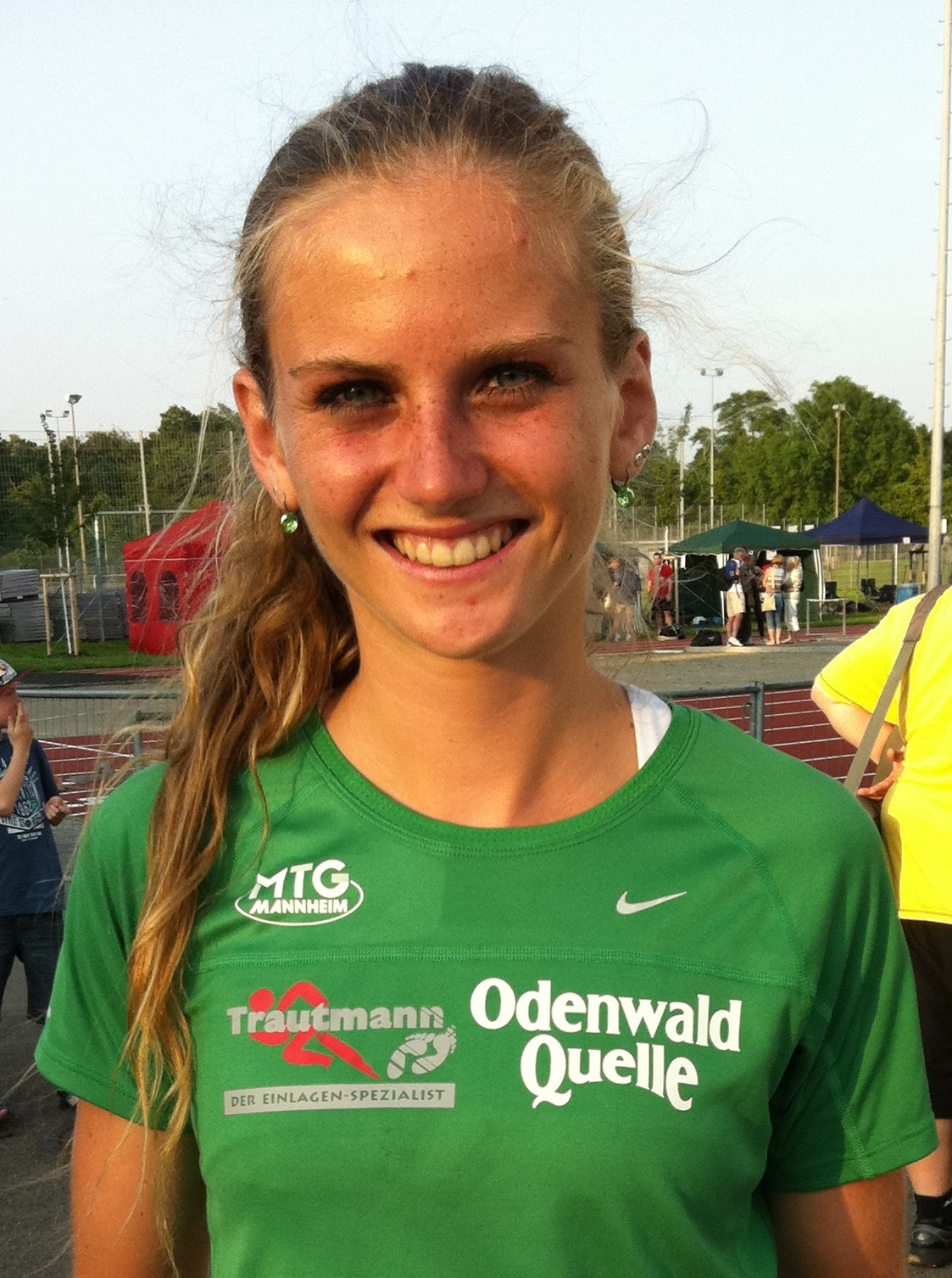
- Fabienne Königstein in 2013

Personal information
- Born: 25 November 1992 (age 33)
- Height: 170 cm (5 ft 7 in)
- Weight: 54 kg (119 lb)

Sport
- Country: Germany
- Sport: Track and field
- Event: Marathon running
- Club: Hannover 96
- Coached by: Dr. Karsten Königstein

Achievements and titles
- Personal bests: 10k run: 32:35; Half marathon: 1:09:32; Marathon: 2:22:17

Fabienne Königstein (née Amrhein; born 25 November 1992) is a German Marathon and long-distance runner. Her major achievements by now were the 6th place at the World University Games 2017 over the Halfmarathon distance, the German Marathon Title 2018 and the 11th place at the European Athletics Championships 2018 in the Women's Marathon Competition. She also is a several times medalist in German National Championships.

== Athletic career ==
Fabienne Königstein had her first overall appearance in 1997 at the age of 4 for the TSG Wiesloch. In 2001 at the age of 8 she joined SG Nußloch. During the following 5 years she received a basic combined athletic education. To focus on her particular talent for running, Königstein joined the Track and Field Team of Christian Stang at MTG Mannheim in 2006 at the age of 13. After her first appearance at German National Championships in 2008 over the 400 m Hurdles (U16) she regularly participated in national and international championships.

In 2013, at the age of 20, Königstein accomplished the breakthrough in the German National Women's competition with a 5th place at the 5000 m race and also had her debut for the German National Team at the European Cross-Country Championships in Belgrade. At the European Cross-Country Championships in Chia, Italy, in 2016 she placed 20th in the Women's competition. Amrhein won the silver medal at the German Cross-Country Championships, placed 6th at the World University Games in Taipei over the 21.1 km and celebrated her debut over the Marathon distance at the Berlin Marathon. In adverse weather conditions she finished 11th after 2h 34min and 14sec in a world class field led by Gladys Cherono. In spring 2018 Königstein finished 3d at the German Half Marathon Championships. Three weeks later at 29 April 2018 she won her first gold medal at the German Marathon Championships, finishing 2nd at the Düsseldorf Marathon behind Volha Mazuronak in 2h 32min and 34sec.

On her first appearance at European Marathon Championships in Berlin 2018, Königstein placed 11th, being the most successful German Athlete in this race. In December, Königstein concluded the season with a bronze medal at the SPAR European Cross-Country Championships in Tilburg. She placed 19th and, therefore, as the second-best German runner, although she had had a severe respiratory infection shortly before the race.

After a 18-months injury lay-off, Fabienne Königstein had a comeback in October 2020 at the World Half Marathon Championships in Gdynia, Poland, where she won the bronze medal with Team Germany. After another injury lay-off in 2021 and pregnancy in 2022 she had a second comeback in spring 2023, winning the bronze medal at the German National Half Marathon Championships and breaking her 10k PB at the Paderborner Osterlauf by 40 seconds (32:36 min, 10th place). Königstein had a sensational comeback on the Marathon distance after almost 5 years at the Haspa Marathon Hamburg. Only 9 months after giving birth to her child, she improved her PB by 7 minutes to 2:25:48h breaking the Olympic standard for the first time in her career, and placed herself on 6th place of the all-time German Marathon ranking.

Since 2022, Königstein is coached by her husband, Dr. Karsten Königstein. In 2025 she ran her marathon personal best of 2:22:17 placing 6th at the BMW Berlin Marathon under warm conditions.

== Achievements ==
=== World Championships Honors ===
- 2017 6th Summer Universiade, Taipei, Half Marathon
- 2020 3rd Half Marathon World Championships with Team Germany

=== European Championships Honors ===
- 2013 5th European Cross-Country Championships (U23) with Team Germany
- 2014 4th SPAR European Cross-Country Championships (U23) with Team Germany
- 2013, 2014 and 2015 participation in SPAR European Cross Country Championships (U23 and Women)
- 2015 1st Oxford Half, Oxford (UK)
- 2015 12th EAA-Permit, Cross de l'Acier, Leffrinckoucke (France)
- 2016 11th EAA-Permit Warandeloop, Tilburg, (Netherlands)
- 2016 20th European Cross Country Championships, Chia, Italy and 7th with Team Germany
- 2017 22nd Great Edinburgh International Cross Country, Edinburgh (Scotland) and 2nd with Team Europe
- 2017 28th European Cross Country Championships and 6th with Team Germany
- 2018 11th European Championships Berlin (Marathon)
- 2018 3rd European Cross Country Championships with Team Germany and individual 19th

=== National Championships Honors ===
- 2010 3rd 1500 m (U20)
- 2011 3rd 1500 m (U20)
- 2013 3rd 5000 m (U23)
- 2015 3rd Cross-Country (Women)
- 2017 2nd Cross-Country (Women)
- 2018 3rd Half Marathon
- 2018 1st Marathon
- 2023 3rd Half Marathon

=== Marathons ===
- 2017 11th Berlin Marathon
- 2018 2nd Düsseldorf Marathon
- 2018 11th European Marathon Championships
- 2023 8th Haspa Marathon Hamburg
- 2025 6th BMW Berlin Marathon

== Personal bests ==
- 800 m: 2:11,12 min
- 1500 m: 4:29,04 min
- Mile: 4:59,36 min
- 3000 m: 9:13,97 min
- 5000 m: 16:12,39 min
- 10.000 m: 33:04,62 min
- 10 km (Road): 32:35 min
- Half marathon: 1h 09:32 min
- Marathon: 2h 22:17 min

== Awards ==
- 2012, 2014, 2015 and 2017 Sports Award City of Mannheim
- 2018 Rhein-Neckar Award (Publikumsliebling)
- 2018 German Road Races Award (Best female Road Runner of the Year)
