= Melat Yisak Kejeta =

Ethiopian-German long-distance runner

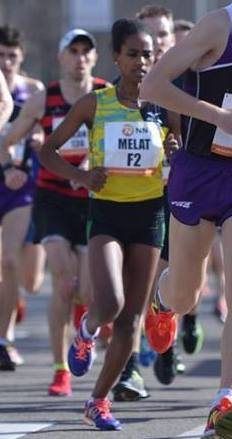
- Melat Yisak Kejeta in 2017

Personal information
- Nationality: German
- Born: 27 September 1992 (age 33) Achebe, Ethiopia
- Height: 1.65 m (5 ft 5 in)

Sport
- Country: Germany
- Sport: Athletics
- Event: Long-distance running
- Club: Laufteam Kassel (2019–)
- Coached by: Winfried Aufenanger
Medal record
Women's athletics
Representing Germany
World Half Marathon Championships
Silver medal – second place	2020 Gdynia	Half marathon
Bronze medal – third place	2020 Gdynia	Team

Melat Yisak Kejeta (born 27 September 1992) is an Ethiopian long-distance runner. She won the silver medal for the women's race at the 2020 World Half Marathon Championships and represented Germany at the 2020 Tokyo Olympics. Kejeta is the European record holder for the women's only half marathon.

== Personal life ==
Melat Yisak Kejeta was born in Ethiopia. She is a member of the Oromo ethnic group, like the Dibaba sisters who are among her role models. She came to Germany in 2013 as a refugee and acquired German citizenship in March 2019. She lives in Baunatal near Kassel with her husband whom she met in a German regional train.

== Career ==
She was a talented U20 runner and became good again after having gained a foothold in Germany. In 2018, she improved her half marathon personal best to 1:08:41, which would have ranked her third on the 2018 European top list had she already been a German citizen.

In 2019, she made her marathon debut at the 2019 Berlin Marathon held in Berlin, Germany. She had prepared for that in Kenya under the guidance of Eliud Kipchoge's coach Patrick Sang who assessed her marathon potential to be somewhere in the range from 2:19 to 2:22. She finished in sixth place in the women's category with a time of 2:23:57, which as of 8 August 2021 was the fastest marathon debut by a German woman (previously Irina Mikitenko at the 2007 Berlin Marathon) and put her third on the German all-time top list behind Mikitenko's 2:19:19 and Uta Pippig's 2:21:45.

Since 6 March 2020, she is eligible to represent Germany in international championships. She made her debut in the German national team in the women's race at the 2020 World Athletics Half Marathon Championships held in Gdynia, Poland. The winner was Peres Jepchirchir of Kenya with 1:05:16, a new world record for a women's only run. Kejeta won silver in 1:05:18. This time was an improvement on her personal best by 3:23, on the German record by 2:40, and on the European record for women-only races by 1:07. Kejeta's split time for the 10 km was 30:47, faster than the German national record for the 10 k. Her performance also helped Germany to win an unexpected team bronze. These were the first German medals ever in a half marathon world championship.

On 7 August 2021, she participated in the marathon at the 2020 Tokyo Olympics (which had been postponed due to COVID-19) and finished sixth, the best result of a German marathon runner in Olympic Games since Atlanta 1996 when Katrin Dörre-Heinig finished fourth. She participated in the 2024 Olympic marathon in Paris but did not finish.

== Achievements ==
=== International competitions ===
Representing Germany
Year	Competition	Venue	Position	Event	Time
2020	World Half Marathon Championships	Gdynia, Poland	2nd	Half marathon	1:05:18 AR_{wo}
2021	Olympic Games	Sapporo, Japan	6th	Marathon	2:29:16
2023	World Championships	Budapest, Hungary	11th	Marathon	2:29:04

=== Personal bests ===
Road

- 5 kilometres – 15:51 (Trier 2017)
- 10 kilometres – 31:50 (Oelde 2019)
- Half marathon – 1:05:18 (Gdynia 2020) Wo European record
- Marathon – 2:23:57 (Berlin 2019)

=== National titles ===
- German Athletics Championships
  - 10 kilometres: 2016
