= Lauren McNeil =

British athlete (born 1999)

Personal information
- Nationality: British
- Born: 20 December 1999 (age 26)

Sport
- Sport: Athletics
- Event: Long distance running
Medal record
Women's athletics
Representing Great Britain
European Athletics Championships
Gold medal – first place	2024 Rome	Half marathon team

Lauren McNeil (born 20 December 1999) is a British long distance runner. She was a gold medalist in the team half marathon at the 2024 European Athletics Championships.

== Early life ==
From Buxton in Derbyshire, she attended the University of British Columbia. McNeil won a silver at the CW Championship in Saskatoon in 2021.

== Career ==
She finished tenth running for England the Belgian Cross Cup in 2023. In March 2023, she finished fourth at the English national cross country championships.

She finished second at the London International Cross Country event in January 2024. In March 2024, she was selected for the 2024 World Cross Country Championships in Belgrade, where she finished in 45th place. She finished fifth at the Berlin Half Marathon in April 2024.

In August 2025, McNeil won the half-marathon race in 1:11:25 at the 2025 Athletics Canada Half-Marathon Championships in Edmonton, finishing ahead of Canadian national marathon record holder Natasha Wodak and Florence Caron.

She was selected to run the half marathon for Britain at the 2024 European Athletics Championships in Rome. She won a gold medal in the half marathon team event.

On 15 March 2026, she placed third behind Alex Bell and Jess Warner-Judd at the official British Athletics trial race for the half marathon at the 2026 World Athletics Road Running Championships, held at the Bath Half Marathon, finishing in 71:50.
