= Meritxell Soler =

Spanish athlete

Personal information
- Full name: Meritxell Soler Delgado
- Nationality: Spanish
- Born: 20 July 1992 (age 34) Sant Joan de Vilatorrada, Spain
- Height: 1.65 m (5 ft 5 in)

Sport
- Sport: Athletics
- Event: Long distance running

Meritxell Soler Delgado (born 20 July 1992) is a Spanish runner who competes in long distance events. She represented Spain in numerous international athletics events, including the 2024 Olympic Games. She was the 2022 national Half Marathon Champion, winning the race held in Seville.

== Statistics ==
=== Personal bests ===
Track

- 5000 metres – 15:56.69 (Granollers 2022)
- 10,000 metres – 32:54.28 (Pacé 2022)

Road

- 10 kilometres – 32:31 (Barcelona 2022)
- Half marathon – 1:10:21 (Santa Pola 2024)
- Marathon – 2:24:57 (Seville 2024)

== International competitions ==
Year	Competition	Venue	Position	Event	Notes
Representing Spain
2022	European 10,000 m Cup	Pacé, France	17th	10,000 m	32:54.28
2023	World Championships	Budapest, Hungary	27th	Marathon	2:34:38
2024	European Championships	Rome, Italy	32nd	Half marathon	1:12:16
2024	Olympic Games	Paris, France	25th	Marathon	2:29:56
2025	European Running Championships	Leuven, Belgium	10th	Half marathon	1:12:52
2026	European Championships	Birmingham, United Kingdom	20th	Marathon	2:32:21
