= Méline Rollin =

French long-distance runner

Personal information
- Born: 17 June 1998 (age 28) Villers-Semeuse, France
- Height: 169 cm (5 ft 7 in)
- Weight: 51 kg (112 lb)

Sport
- Country: France
- Sport: Track and field
- Events: Long-distance running Marathon
- Coached by: Azis Zidane

Achievements and titles
- Personal best: Marathon: 2:24:12 (2024)

Méline Rollin (born 17 June 1998) is a French long-distance runner. She competed in the women's marathon event at the 2024 Summer Olympics.
