= Joan Chelimo =

Kenyan long-distance runner

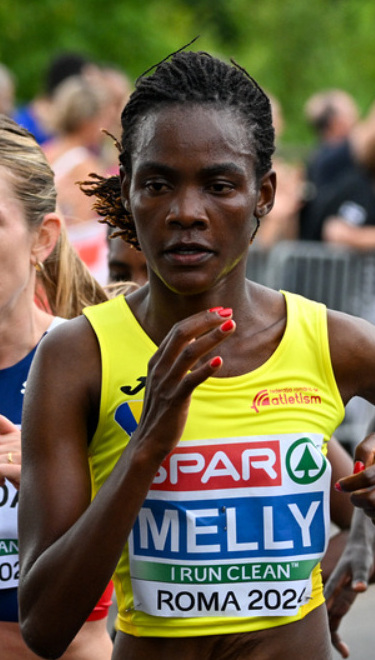
- Chelimo in 2024

Personal information
- Full name: Joan Chelimo Melly
- Born: 10 November 1990 (age 35) Kenya
- Height: 1.71 m (5 ft 7 in)

Sport
- Country: Romania
- Sport: Athletics
- Event: Marathon

Joan Chelimo Melly (born 10 November 1990) is a Kenyan and Romanian female long-distance runner who competes in road running competitions. She is the 2018 Prague Half Marathon Champion and the winner of other prestigious road races such as Berlin Half Marathon, Boston 10K and Boston Half Marathon.

== Biography ==
=== Career ===
Chelimo ran 1500 metres while at school, going up to the National Championship level. She began to compete in small road races in 2011, mainly running in Spain and Morocco for the next 3 years. During that period, she won several races, including the Valencia 10K in a course record of 32:17 and the OCP 10K Int’l de Khouribga where she set a then 31:41 personal best over the 10K distance.

She ended her 2014 season with 3 consecutive victories, winning Wachau Half Marathon in 1:11:52, Swansea 10K and Cardiff Half Marathon.

Due to pregnancy, she skipped the 2015 season and returned to competition in September 2016 by placing sixth at the Kericho 10K.

Chelimo won the 2017 Berlin Half Marathon in 1:08:45. In May, she finished second at Le Puy-en-Velay 15K before winning Boston 10K in a new best of 31:24 In September, she ended up second at the Copenhagen Half Marathon after leading most of the race, clocking a new personal best of 1:06:25, the seventh fastest time of the year. She came back to Boston in October and won her second Boston Athletic Association event of the year by taking a commanding victory at the Boston Half Marathon in 1:10:31.

In 2018 Chelimo won the Elgeyo-Marakwet County Cross Country Championship. Three weeks later she became the ninth woman to ever run a half marathon under sixty-six minutes, finishing fourth at Ras Al Khaimah Half Marathon with a new personal best of 1:05:37 in a race widely regarded as the greatest women’s half marathon ever held. Following her excellent performances and after going out under world-record pace for about seventeen kilometers, Chelimo won the 2018 Prague Half Marathon in 1:05:04, becoming the 4th fastest women of all-time over the distance. In September, she finished third at the Copenhagen Half Marathon after taking out the race at world-record pace for fifteen kilometers before being overtaken by Dutch athlete Sifan Hassan in the last two kilometers of the race. She then went on to win the 2018 Boston Half Marathon, defending her title and winning the race for the second consecutive time in 1:09:34. She won her last race of the season with ease at the Montferland Run.

In May 2021 Chelimo became a Romanian citizen. She won the Paris Half Marathon on 3 March 2024.

=== Activism ===
Chelimo is a survivor of gender-based violence. In order to raise awareness on the threats that athletes often face, in 2021 she co-founded Tirop’s Angels, a union of Kenyan athletes which campaigns against gender-based violence in the country and abroad. The union was titled in honour of a fellow runner, the world record-holder Agnes Tirop, stabbed to death in October 2021 at her home in Iten, allegedly by her husband. In May 2024 it opened an office in Iten.

In addition, Chelimo founded Strides for Africa,a Kenyan charitable trust focused on preventing and responding to gender-based violence. According to the organisation, it provides survivor support, education and women's empowerment programmes, including counselling, medical and legal assistance, educational bursaries, financial-literacy and vocational training, and community outreach initiatives.

== Personal life ==
She is married and has a daughter named Ariana. She trains and lives in Iten.

== Road race wins and championship medals ==
Year	Competition	Venue	Position	Event	Notes
2011	Torrevieja Half Marathon	Torrevieja, Spain	1st	Half marathon	1:18:16
2011	Alicante Half Marathon	Alicante, Spain	1st	Half marathon	1:17:50
2011	Bilbao 15K	Bilbao, Spain	1st	15K	53:43
2011	Crevillentina 10K	Crevillentina, Spain	1st	10K	33:56
2012	Khouribga 10K	Khouribga, Morocco	1st	10K	31:41 CR
2012	Bilbao 15K	Bilbao, Spain	1st	15K	53:52
2012	Valencia 10K	Valencia, Spain	1st	10K	32:17 CR
2014	Mohammédia 10K	Mohammédia, Morocco	1st	10K	31:58
2014	Wachau Half Marathon	Krems an der Donau, Austria	1st	Half marathon	1:11:52
2014	Swansea 10K	Swansea, United Kingdom	1st	10K	33:04
2014	Cardiff Half Marathon	Cardiff, United Kingdom	1st	Half marathon	1:12:26
2017	Berlin Half Marathon	Berlin, Germany	1st	Half marathon	1:08:45
2017	Boston 10K	Boston, USA	1st	10K	31:24
2017	Boston Half Marathon	Boston, USA	1st	Half marathon	1:10:31
2018	Prague Half Marathon	Prague, Czech Republic	1st	Half marathon	1:05:04
2018	Kisii Half Marathon	Kisii, KEN	1st	Half Marathon	1:10:25
2018	Boston Half Marathon	Boston, USA	1st	Half Marathon	1:09:34
2018	Montferland Run	's-Heerenberg, NED	1st	15K	48:44
2024	Paris Half Marathon	Paris, FRA	1st	Half Marathon	1:06:58
2024	European Championships	Rome, ITA	2nd	Half Marathon	1:08:55

== Personal bests ==
- 5K – 14:51 (2018)
- 10K – 30:14 (2018)
- 15K – 45:54 (2018)
- Half marathon – 1:05:04 (2018)
