= Mekdes Woldu =

French long-distance runner (born 1992)

Personal information
- Nationality: French
- Born: 20 October 1992 (age 33) Adi-keblo, Eritrea
- Height: 1.64 m (5 ft 5 in)
- Weight: 43 kg (95 lb)

Sport
- Country: France
- Sport: Athletics
- Event: Long-distance running
- Club: Entente Franconville Césame Val-d'Oise (EFCVO)
- Coached by: Thierry Choffin

Mekdes Woldu (born 20 October 1992) is a French long-distance runner of Eritrean origin.

== Biography ==
Mekdes Woldu was born in Adi-keblo, Eritrea. She was naturalized as a French citizen on 26 May 2021.

=== Career ===
As an Eritrean athlete, she finished eighth in the 5,000 metres at the 2011 African Games in Maputo.

After becoming a French citizen, she achieved several national titles in 2021, winning the French Championships in the 10,000 metres, the French 10 km Championships, and the French semi-marathon Championships. In October of the same year, she won the Marseille-Cassis 20-kilometre race.

In 2022, she set the new French record for the semi-marathon. She ran her first marathon in Hamburg in April 2023, achieving the third-best performance of all time by a French woman and qualifying for the 2023 World Athletics Championships and the 2024 Summer Olympics in Paris. In June 2024, she became the official sponsor of the Base Aérienne 705 de Tours. In 2025, she set the new French marathon record.

== Achievements ==
Year	Competition	Location	Event	Result	Notes
2011	African Games	Maputo, Mozambique	5,000 metres	8th	16:08.57
2021	French Championships	Pacé, France	10,000 metres	1st	32:20.65
2024	Olympic Games	Paris, France	Marathon	20th	2:29:20
2024	European Championships	Rome, Italy	Semi-marathon	8th	
