= Katharina Steinruck =

German long-distance runner (born 1989)

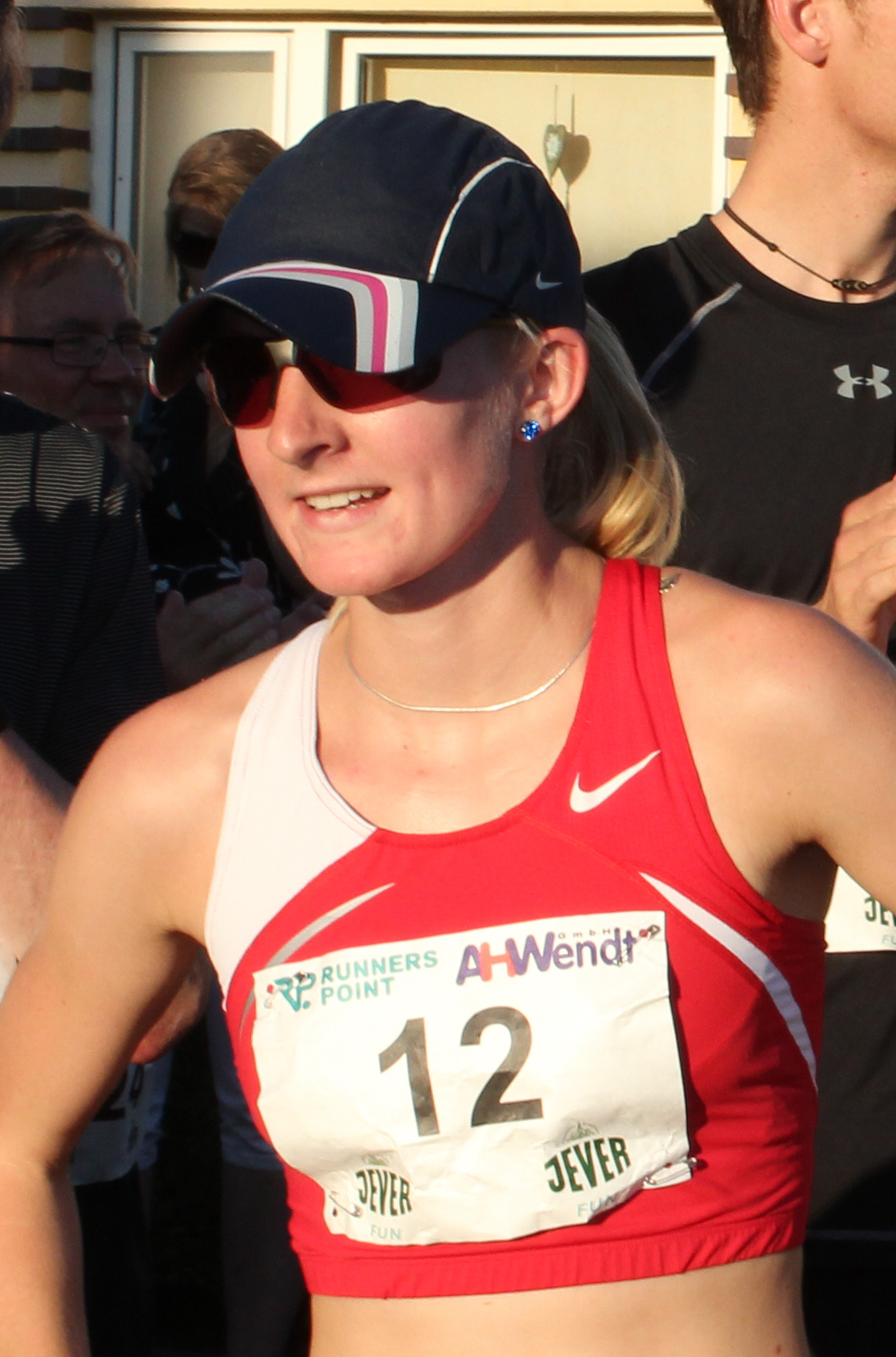
- Katharina Heinig in 2012

Personal information
- Born: Katharina Heinig; 22 August 1989 (age 36) Leipzig, Germany
- Height: 166 cm (5 ft 5 in)
- Weight: 49 kg (108 lb)

Sport
- Country: Germany
- Sport: Long-distance running
- Event: Marathon
Medal record
Women's long-distance running
German Athletics Championships
Gold medal – first place	2017 Erfurt	Marathon

Katharina Steinruck (née Heinig; born 22 August 1989) is a German long-distance runner. Her is mother German long-distance runner Katrin Dörre-Heinig.

== Career ==
She competed in the women's marathon at the 2017 World Championships in Athletics. In April 2021, she ran 2:25:59 for a first place finish in the Enschede Marathon.
