= Abbie Donnelly =

British athlete (born 1996)

Personal information
- Nationality: Great Britain
- Born: 2 September 1996 (age 30)

Sport
- Sport: Athletics
- Event: 5000m

Achievements and titles
- Personal bests: 5000m: 15:42.65 (Milton Keynes, 2021); 10000m: 31:45.37 (London, 2024); Half marathon: 1:09.10 (Barcelona, 2024); Marathon: 2:24:11 (Frankfurt, 2025)
Medal record
Women's athletics
Representing Great Britain
World Road Running Championships
Bronze medal – third place	2023 Riga	Half marathon team
European Athletics Championships
Gold medal – first place	2026 Birmingham	Marathon team
Gold medal – first place	2024 Rome	Half marathon team
Bronze medal – third place	2026 Birmingham	Marathon
European Cross Country Championships
Gold medal – first place	2023 Brussels	Team
Gold medal – first place	2019 Lisbon	Team
Silver medal – second place	2024 Antalya	Team
Bronze medal – third place	2023 Brussels	Individual
Bronze medal – third place	2018 Tilburg	U23 Team

Abbie Donnelly (born 2 September 1996) is a British track and field athlete and cross country runner. She was a bronze medalist in the individual marathon and gold medalist in the team event at the 2026 European Athletics Championships, becoming the first British woman to win an individual medal in the event. She had previously won gold in the half marathon team/European Half Marathon Cup event at the 2024 European Athletics Championships. She was a bronze medalist in the individual and gold medalist in the team event at the 2023 European Cross Country Championships

== Early life ==
From Lincolnshire, Donnelly attended Lincoln Wellington Athletics Club from a young-age alongside her sister Laura, taken by their father, a keen middle-distance runner. She became the English schools cross country champion in 2015.

== Career ==
In 2018, Donnelly was part of the Great Britain U23 team that won the bronze medal at the 2018 European Cross Country Championships, held in Tilburg, Netherlands. She then won gold as part of the British women's senior team at the 2019 European Cross Country Championships in Lisbon.

Donnelly was the highest European finisher at the 2023 World Athletics Cross Country Championships in Bathurst, New South Wales, in February 2023, as she finished 24th overall.

Donnelly finished third in The Big Half in London in September 2023, a result that qualified her for the World Road Running Championships in Riga later that year. In Riga, she finished 25th overall in the half marathon, and the British team won a bronze medal in the event.

In December 2023, Donnelly was a bronze medalist in the individual and gold medalist in the team event, at the 2023 European Cross Country Championships.

On 20 January 2024, she won the London International Cross Country event. She ran a new half marathon personal best time of 69:10 in Barcelona on 11 February 2024. In March 2024, she won the UK Inter-Counties Cross Country Championships at Wollaton Park. She finished twentieth at the 2024 World Cross Country Championships in Serbia on 30 March 2024. She ran a 10,000 metres personal best of 31:45.37 in London in May 2024. She was selected to run the half marathon for Britain at the 2024 European Athletics Championships in Rome. She won a gold medal in the team half marathon.

She was selected for the British team for the 2024 European Cross Country Championships in Antalya, Turkey.

She won the Bath Half Marathon on 16 March 2025, which acted as the official British Athletics trial race for the World Athletics Road Running Championships half marathon. She finished fourth in the British women's 10,000m national championship race in Birmingham in June 2025, running a time of 32:02.54. She was runner-up to Jess Warner-Judd at the Big Half in London in September 2025. The following month, Donnelly ran a personal best 2:24:11 at the Frankfurt Marathon.

On 16 August, Donnelly became the first British woman to win a European Championship marathon medal, winning the bronze in 2:27:33 at the 2026 European Championships in Birmingham, which also helped Great Britain win team gold. It was only her third race at the marathon distance, and her first at a major championships. In October 2026, she was moved up to the confirmation level in the 2026-27 Olympic World Class Programme awarded by UK Athletics.

== Personal life ==
Donnelly graduated in history from the Loughborough University in 2019 and began a PhD at the university.
