= Mélody Julien =

French long-distance runner

Personal information
- Born: 13 May 1999 (age 27) Castres, France
- Height: 168 cm (5 ft 6 in)
- Weight: 49 kg (108 lb)

Sport
- Country: France
- Sport: Athletics
- Event: Long-distance running
- Club: Association Multisports Montredonnaise
- Coached by: Max Lesauvage

Mélody Julien (born 13 May 1999) is a French long-distance runner. She competed in the women's half marathon at the 2020 World Athletics Half Marathon Championships held in Gdynia, Poland. She competed at the women's marathon at the 2024 Summer Olympics.
