= Angelika Mach =

Polish long-distance runner

Personal information
- Born: 7 September 1991 (age 34) Tarnogród, Poland
- Height: 1.52 m (5 ft 0 in)

Sport
- Country: Poland
- Sport: Long-distance running

Angelika Mach (born 7 September 1991) is a Polish long-distance runner. In 2020, she competed in the women's half marathon at the 2020 World Athletics Half Marathon Championships held in Gdynia, Poland.

Mach also competed for Poland at the 2020 and 2024 Summer Olympics.
