= Clara Evans =

British long-distance runner

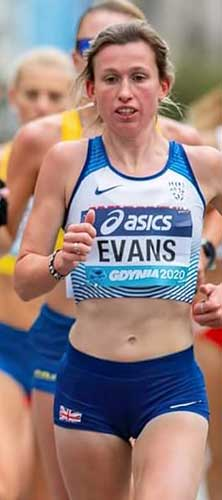
- Evans in 2020

Personal information
- Full name: Clara Evans-Graham
- Born: 27 November 1993 (age 32) Hereford, England
- Height: 1.58 m (5 ft 2 in)

Sport
- Country: Great Britain
- Sport: Long-distance running
- Club: Pontypridd Roadents AC

Achievements and titles
- Olympic finals: 46th Paris 2024
- World finals: 21st Team Bronze World Athletics Road Running Championships, Riga 2023
- Regional finals: 9th Team Gold Rome 2024 34th Team Gold Birmingham 2026
- Commonwealth finals: 9th Birmingham 2022

Clara Evans-Graham (born 27 November 1993), formerly known as Clara Evans, is a British long-distance runner who has represented Great Britain at international competitions including the 2024 Summer Olympics and Wales at the 2022 Commonwealth Games.

== Career ==
In 2020, Evans competed for Great Britain in the women's half marathon at the World Athletics Half Marathon Championships held in Gdynia, Poland.

In 2022, she competed for Wales in the women’s marathon at the Commonwealth Games held in Birmingham, England. She finished in ninth place.

At the 2022, 2024 and 2026 TCS London Marathon she was the Elite Women’s Pacemaker.

In 2023, she ran a time of 2:25:01 at the Valencia Marathon, breaking the Welsh record and achieving the Paris Olympics qualification time. Evans competed for Great Britain in the woman's half marathon at the 2023 World Athletics Road Running Championships, held in Riga, Latvia. She finished 22nd and Great Britain secured a team bronze.

Evans was selected to compete for Great Britain in the Women's Half Marathon at the 26th European Athletics Championships in Rome, Italy in June 2024. She finished 9th overall in a personal best, helping Great Britain win gold in the team event.

Evans received a late call-up to run the marathon at the 2024 Summer Olympics when Charlotte Purdue withdrew just days before the race due to an ankle injury. She was the highest placed British competitor in the event, finishing 46th.

Clara currently holds the Welsh 10k and Half Marathon records.
