= 2023 World Athletics Road Running Championships =

Inaugural edition, in Riga, Latvia

- 2023 World Athletics Road Running Championships logo
- Host city: Riga
- Country: Latvia
- Organizer: World Athletics
- Edition: 1st
- Nations: 56 + ART
- Athletes: 347
- Events: 9
- Dates: 1 October 2023
- Race length: Half marathon, 5K, mile
- Website: Riga23; Results

The 2023 World Athletics Road Running Championships took place in Riga, Latvia, on 1 October 2023. As the inaugural World Athletics Road Running Championships, they included the World Athletics Half Marathon Championships, which were last held in 2020. (Note: The 2022 edition of the half marathon series was cancelled due to the coronavirus pandemic.) A flat, single-lap marathon course in the Baltics' largest city. All courses were traffic-free.

The championships held races for the half marathon, 5K, and mile distances, and also included mass-participation events for the same.

This was the first time when any recreational runner who was ready for a challenge could register for any of the official mass races of the World Championships in Riga and earn a unique medal from the World Athletics Road Running Championships.

== Results ==
=== Men's half marathon ===
Rank	Athlete	Nationality	Time	Notes
1st place, gold medalist(s)	Sabastian Sawe	Kenya	59:10	CR
2nd place, silver medalist(s)	Daniel Ebenyo	Kenya	59:14	
3rd place, bronze medalist(s)	Samwel Mailu	Kenya	59:19	
4	Jemal Yimer Mekonnen	Ethiopia	59:22	
5	Jimmy Gressier	France	59:46	PB
6	Thabang Mosiako	South Africa	59:52	PB
7	Nibret Melak	Ethiopia	1:00:11	
8	Benard Kibet	Kenya	1:00:13	
9	Samsom Amare	Eritrea	1:00:19	PB
10	Tsegay Kidanu	Ethiopia	1:00:21	
11	Stephen Mokoka	South Africa	1:00:29	PB
12	Tomoki Ota	Japan	1:00:43	
13	Elroy Gelant	South Africa	1:00:56	PB
14	Mohamed Reda El Aaraby	Morocco	1:01:03	
15	Djamal Abdi Direh	Djibouti	1:01:05	
16	Ibrahim Hassan	Djibouti	1:01:06	SB
17	Pietro Riva	Italy	1:01:06	SB
18	Abel Chebet	Uganda	1:01:09	SB
19	Precious Lesiba Mashele	South Africa	1:01:13	
20	Ali Chebures	Uganda	1:01:22	SB
21	Andrew Rotich Kwemoi	Uganda	1:01:25	SB
22	Aleksander Tekleweld	Eritrea	1:01:26	PB
23	Valentin Gondouin	France	1:01:27	PB
24	Mehdi Frére	France	1:01:27	
25	Abbabiya Simbassa	United States	1:01:28	SB
26	Samuel Barata	Portugal	1:01:29	PB
27	Mahamed Mahamed	Great Britain	1:01:33	
28	Tadesse Getahon	Israel	1:01:34	SB
29	Yohanes Chiappinelli	Italy	1:01:37	
30	Jack Rowe	Great Britain	1:01:39	
31	Simon Debognies	Belgium	1:01:48	PB
32	Davor Aaron Bienenfeld	Germany	1:01:49	PB
33	Futsum Zienasellassie	United States	1:01:49	SB
34	Jonathan Mellor	Great Britain	1:01:59	PB
35	Hosea Kiplangat	Uganda	1:02:02	PB
36	Jacob Thomson	United States	1:02:26	PB
37	Therence Bizoza	Burundi	1:02:38	SB
38	Richard Ringer	Germany	1:02:47	
39	Hermon Habtemicael	Eritrea	1:02:48	PB
40	Iliass Aouani	Italy	1:02:51	SB
41	Girmaw Aamare	Israel	1:02:53	SB
42	Andreas Vojta	Austria	1:02:55	
43	Bukayawe Malede	Israel	1:02:57	SB
44	Benjamin Choquert	France	1:02:59	
45	Cameron Avery	New Zealand	1:03:00	
46	Mohcin Outalha	Morocco	1:03:01	
47	Hamza Sahli	Morocco	1:03:20	SB
48	Tim Vincent	Australia	1:03:40	
49	Marcelo Laguera	Mexico	1:03:42	
50	Peter Herzog	Austria	1:03:47	
51	Jean Marie Bukuru	Burundi	1:03:50	PB
52	Johnatas de Oliveira	Brazil	1:03:50	
53	Reed Fischer	United States	1:03:56	
54	Juan Antonio Pérez	Spain	1:04:00	SB
55	Ryota Kondo	Japan	1:04:01	
56	Jean Marie Vianney Niyomukiza	Burundi	1:04:03	SB
57	Filmon Teklebrhan-Berhe	Germany	1:04:12	
58	Fábio Correia	Brazil	1:04:12	
59	Kidane Andemikael	Eritrea	1:04:12	PB
60	Hiko Tonosa Haso	Ireland	1:04:14	
61	Leonid Latsepov	Estonia	1:04:16	SB
62	Yitayew Abuhay	Israel	1:04:34	SB
63	Maicon Mancuso	Brazil	1:04:45	PB
64	Oska Inkster-Baynes	New Zealand	1:04:52	
65	Rubén Arando	Bolivia	1:04:53	PB
66	Mohammadreza Abootorabi	Sweden	1:04:54	SB
67	Rafael Loza	Ecuador	1:05:29	
68	Diego Arévalo	Ecuador	1:05:33	PB
69	Christopher Dryden	New Zealand	1:05:38	
70	Edward Goddard	Australia	1:05:46	
71	Jānis Višķers	Latvia	1:06:01	SB
72	Jorge Luis Cruz	Mexico	1:06:47	
73	Christian Birch Okkels	Denmark	1:06:54	
74	Luke Micallef	Malta	1:06:55	SB
75	Mykola Nyzhnyk	Ukraine	1:07:31	
76	Michael Voss	New Zealand	1:07:32	
77	Altobeli Silva	Brazil	1:07:58	
78	Philippe Parrot-Migas	Canada	1:07:59	
79	Dillon Cassar	Malta	1:08:20	
80	Simon Spiteri	Malta	1:08:37	PB
81	Christian Vásconez	Ecuador	1:08:38	
82	Iván Zarco	Honduras	1:09:07	SB
83	Aleksandr Salakhudinov	Kyrgyzstan	1:10:46	
84	Christopher Soosai	Malaysia	1:11:42	
85	Arturs Bareikis	Latvia	1:11:54	SB
86	Leong Meng Tak	Macau	1:12:26	NR
87	Aleksandrs Raščevskis	Latvia	1:12:41	
88	Carlos González	Paraguay	1:14:28	
89	Gordon Lim Wei Xiang	Singapore	1:15:27	PB
90	Keane Ko	Singapore	1:21:55	
	Justin Kent	Canada	DNF	
	Samuel Freire	Cape Verde	DNF	
	Jacob Sommer Simonsen	Denmark	DNF	
	Peter Lynch	Ireland	DNF	
	Dmitrijs Serjogins	Latvia	DNF	
	Seah Chuan Heng	Singapore	DNF	
	Nicolás Cuestas	Uruguay	DNF	

=== Women's half marathon ===
Rank	Athlete	Nationality	Time	Notes
1st place, gold medalist(s)	Peres Jepchirchir	Kenya	1:07:25	CR
2nd place, silver medalist(s)	Margaret Kipkemboi	Kenya	1:07:26	
3rd place, bronze medalist(s)	Catherine Amanang'ole	Kenya	1:07:34	
4	Tsigie Gebreselama	Ethiopia	1:07:50	
5	Irine Jepchumba Kimais	Kenya	1:08:02	
6	Ftaw Zeray	Ethiopia	1:08:31	
7	Calli Thackery	Great Britain	1:08:56	PB
8	Rahma Tahiri	Morocco	1:09:19	PB
9	Samantha Harrison	Great Britain	1:09:26	
10	Cacisile Sosibo	South Africa	1:09:31	PB
11	Sofiia Yaremchuk	Italy	1:09:37	SB
12	Glenrose Xaba	South Africa	1:09:47	
13	Molly Grabill	United States	1:09:53	PB
14	Isobel Batt-Doyle	Australia	1:10:08	
15	Cian Oldknow	South Africa	1:10:08	PB
16	Annet Chemengich Chelangat	Uganda	1:10:16	PB
17	Rigbe Habteslasie	Eritrea	1:10:27	PB
18	Méline Rollin	France	1:10:35	PB
~~19~~	Belinda Chemutai	Uganda	~~1:10:40~~	DSQ
20	Kaoutar Farkoussi	Morocco	1:10:40	PB
21	Rkia El Moukim	Morocco	1:10:49	PB
22	Clara Evans	Great Britain	1:10:53	SB
23	Carolina Wikström	Sweden	1:10:56	PB
24	Shona Heaslip	Ireland	1:11:07	
25	Abby Donnelly	Great Britain	1:11:08	
26	Mekdes Woldu	France	1:11:12	SB
27	Clementine Mukandanga	Rwanda	1:11:31	SB
28	Yalemget Yaregal	Ethiopia	1:11:34	
29	Sarah Pagano	United States	1:11:37	
30	Manon Trapp	France	1:11:44	
31	Margaux Sieracki	France	1:12:07	SB
32	Amber Zimmerman	United States	1:12:26	
33	Julia Mayer	Austria	1:12:30	
34	Hanane Qallouj	Morocco	1:12:30	SB
35	Silvia Ortiz	Ecuador	1:12:44	SB
36	Hanne Mjøen Maridal	Norway	1:13:14	SB
37	Maria Sagnes Wågan	Norway	1:13:16	SB
38	Emeline Imanizabayo	Rwanda	1:13:19	PB
39	Isabel Oropeza	Mexico	1:14:11	
40	Maor Tiyouri	Israel	1:14:31	
41	Fionnuala Ross	Ireland	1:14:40	SB
42	Valdilene Silva	Brazil	1:14:54	SB
43	Rosa Chacha	Ecuador	1:14:54	
44	Loreta Kančytė	Lithuania	1:15:12	
45	Kesa Molotsane	South Africa	1:15:19	
46	Sinead Noonan	Australia	1:15:29	
47	Vaida Žūsinaitė-Nekriošienė	Lithuania	1:15:35	PB
48	Tara Palm	Australia	1:16:18	
49	Sara Schou Kristensen	Denmark	1:16:20	
50	Karen Ehrenreich	Denmark	1:16:39	SB
51	Laura Maasik	Estonia	1:16:47	PB
52	Annie Saugstrup	Denmark	1:16:54	
53	Anna Yusupova	Azerbaijan	1:17:05	PB
54	Katherine Tisalema	Ecuador	1:17:14	SB
55	Katherine Camp	New Zealand	1:17:35	
56	Aline de Freitas	Brazil	1:17:51	PB
57	Jelena Abele	Latvia	1:18:13	SB
58	Somaya Bousaid	Tunisia	1:18:20	SB
59	Debbie Donald	New Zealand	1:18:35	PB
60	Larissa Quintão	Brazil	1:18:54	SB
61	Sasha Gollish	Canada	1:19:25	
62	Lo Ying Chu	Hong Kong	1:20:42	SB
63	Joelle Cortis	Malta	1:20:47	SB
64	Ilona Marhele	Latvia	1:21:28	SB
65	Anna Kļučņika	Latvia	1:21:52	PB
66	Lisa Bezzina	Malta	1:25:10	SB
67	Sharon Tan Fang Yu	Singapore	1:25:22	PB
68	Agata Strausa	Latvia	1:26:28	
69	Verna Goh Shilei	Singapore	1:31:54	PB
70	Wu Yangyang	Macau	1:33:53	SB
	Jenifer Silva	Brazil	DNF	
	Sarah Lahti	Sweden	DNF	

=== Men's half marathon team ===
The Men's Half-Marathon team event was decided on the aggregate of the first three runners across the line for each nation.

Rank	Country	Time
1st place, gold medalist(s)	Kenya	2:57:43
2nd place, silver medalist(s)	Ethiopia	2:59:54
3rd place, bronze medalist(s)	South Africa	3:01:17
4	France	3:02:40
5	Uganda	3:03:56
6	Eritrea	3:04:33
7	Great Britain	3:05:11
8	Italy	3:05:34
9	United States	3:05:43
10	Israel	3:07:24
11	Morocco	3:07:24
12	Germany	3:08:48
13	Burundi	3:10:31
14	Brazil	3:12:47
15	New Zealand	3:13:30
16	Ecuador	3:19:40
17	Malta	3:23:52
18	Latvia	3:30:36

=== Women's half marathon team ===
The Women's Half-Marathon team event was decided on the aggregate of the first three runners across the line for each nation.

Rank	Country	Time
1st place, gold medalist(s)	Kenya	3:22:25
2nd place, silver medalist(s)	Ethiopia	3:27:55
3rd place, bronze medalist(s)	Great Britain	3:29:15
4	South Africa	3:29:26
5	Morocco	3:30:48
6	France	3:33:31
7	United States	3:33:56
8	Australia	3:41:55
9	Ecuador	3:44:52
10	Denmark	3:49:53
11	Brazil	3:51:39
12	Latvia	4:01:33

=== Men's 5 km ===
The Men's road 5 km race was held on Sunday 1 October 2023 in Riga, Latvia.

Prior to the event:

Rank	Nation	Country	Time	Notes
1st place, gold medalist(s)	Hagos Gebrhiwet	Ethiopia	12:59	CR
2nd place, silver medalist(s)	Yomif Kejelcha	Ethiopia	13:02	
3rd place, bronze medalist(s)	Nicholas Kimeli	Kenya	13:16	SB
4	Dawit Seare	Eritrea	13:21	PB
5	Cornelius Kemboi	Kenya	13:24	SB
6	Etienne Daguinos	France	13:25	PB
7	Morgan McDonald	Australia	13:26	PB
8	Awet Nftalem Kibrab	Norway	13:28	NR
9	Scott Beattie	Great Britain	13:32	PB
10	Jonas Glans	Sweden	13:32	NR
11	Magnus Tuv Myhre	Norway	13:33	PB
12	Benjamin Flanagan	Canada	13:34	
13	Egide Ntakarutimana	Burundi	13:35	PB
14	Olin Hacker	United States	13:36	
15	Célestin Ndikumana	Burundi	13:36	PB
16	Leonard Chemutai	Uganda	13:36	PB
17	Maxime Chaumeton	South Africa	13:36	PB
18	Kanta Shimizu	Japan	13:37	NR
19	Stewart Mcsweyn	Australia	13:39	PB
20	Ouassim Oumaiz	Spain	13:39	SB
21	Ivo Balabanov	Bulgaria	13:41	PB
22	Ahmed Muhumed	United States	13:42	
23	Joel Ibler Lillesø	Denmark	13:46	NR
24	Morgan Le Guen	Switzerland	13:46	PB
25	Kevin Kamenschak	Austria	13:49	PB
26	Eric Speakman	New Zealand	13:49	PB
27	Santiago Catrofe	Uruguay	13:49	SB
28	Derebe Ayele	Israel	13:52	PB
29	Dereje Chekole	Israel	13:54	SB
30	Tiidrek Nurme	Estonia	14:06	PB
31	Abderezak Suleman	Eritrea	14:07	PB
32	Thomas Fafard	Canada	14:08	PB
33	Andrii Atamaniuk	Ukraine	14:08	PB
34	Dismas Yeko	Uganda	14:09	SB
35	Yamato Yoshii	Japan	14:11	PB
36	Tim Verbaandert	Netherlands	14:12	PB
37	Uģis Jocis	Latvia	14:14	NR
38	Nicholas Seoposengwe	South Africa	14:19	
39	Marcin Biskup	Poland	14:40	PB
40	Edgars Šumskis	Latvia	15:01	SB
41	Shaun Goh	Singapore	15:33	PB
	Mikael Johnsen	Denmark	DNS	

=== Women's 5 km ===
The Women's road 5 km race was held on Sunday 1 October 2023 in Riga, Latvia.

Prior to the event:

Record	Time	Athlete	Nation	Venue	Date
World record	14:29.00	Senbere Teferi	Ethiopia	(Germany) Herzogenaurach	12 Sep 2021
World Leading	14:35.00	Mekides Abebe	Ethiopia	(France) Lille	19 Mar 2023
World Leading	14:35.00	Caroline Nyaga	Kenya	(France) Lille	19 Mar 2023

Rank	Nation	Country	Time	Notes
1st place, gold medalist(s)	Beatrice Chebet	Kenya	14:35	CR
2nd place, silver medalist(s)	Lilian Kasait Rengeruk	Kenya	14:39	PB
3rd place, bronze medalist(s)	Ejgayehu Taye	Ethiopia	14:40	SB
4	Medina Eisa	Ethiopia	14:41	PB
5	Nadia Battocletti	Italy	14:45	NR
6	Joy Cheptoyek	Uganda	14:50	NR
7	Weini Kelati Frezghi	United States	15:10	SB
8	Verity Ockenden	Great Britain	15:18	PB
9	Francine Niyomukunzi	Burundi	15:23	NR
10	Klara Lukan	Slovenia	15:25	NR
11	Fiona O'Keeffe	United States	15:40	
12	Caitlin Adams	Australia	15:41	SB
13	Militsa Mircheva	Bulgaria	15:45	PB
14	Nanami Watanabe	Japan	15:46	PB
15	Tayla Kavanagh	South Africa	15:50	PB
16	Kyla Jacobs	South Africa	15:51	PB
17	Julie-Anne Staehli	Canada	15:55	
18	Juliane Hvid	Denmark	15:59	PB
19	Lauren Ryan	Australia	15:59	PB
20	Paulina Kaczyńska	Poland	16:00	PB
21	Federica Del Buono	Italy	16:03	PB
22	Micheline Niyomahoro	Burundi	16:04	PB
23	Peruth Chemutai	Uganda	16:09	
24	Liza Šajn	Slovenia	16:14	PB
25	Jessy Lacourse	Canada	16:15	PB
26	Carolien Millenaar	Denmark	16:17	PB
27	Maria Kote	Eritrea	16:18	PB
28	Bohdana Semyonova	Ukraine	16:25	PB
29	Lina Kiriliuk	Lithuania	16:38	PB
30	Simone Ferraz	Brazil	16:39	PB
31	Helen Bell	Estonia	17:09	PB
32	Evelīna Krista Sitnika	Latvia	17:27	PB
33	Johanna Ardel	Estonia	17:44	PB
34	Vanessa Lee Ying Zhuang	Singapore	18:08	PB

=== Men's road mile ===
Rank	Nation	Country	Time	Notes
1st place, gold medalist(s)	Hobbs Kessler	United States	3:56.13	WR
2nd place, silver medalist(s)	Callum Elson	Great Britain	3:56.41	AR
3rd place, bronze medalist(s)	Samuel Prakel	United States	3:56.43	PB
4	Maël Gouyette	France	3:56.57	PB
5	Kieran Lumb	Canada	3:56.98	PB
6	Ryan Mphahlele	South Africa	3:57.35	PB
7	Giovanni Filippi	Italy	3:57.41	PB
8	Benoit Campion	France	3:57.62	PB
9	Yobiel Weldrufael	Eritrea	3:57.94	PB
10	Jack Anstey	Australia	3:58.30	PB
11	Teddese Lemi	Ethiopia	3:59.40	PB
12	Matthew Ramsden	Australia	4:00.32	PB
13	Kyumbe Munguti	Kenya	4:00.67	PB
14	Salim Abu Mayanja	Uganda	4:00.72	PB
15	Keneth Kiprop	Uganda	4:00.77	PB
16	Ryoji Tatezawa	Japan	4:01.26	PB
17	Santtu Heikkinen	Finland	4:01.35	PB
18	Guilherme Kurtz	Brazil	4:02.75	PB
19	Natnael Teklesenbet	Eritrea	4:03.18	PB
20	Yusuke Takahashi	Japan	4:03.32	PB
21	Andreas Lindgreen	Denmark	4:05.27	
22	Reynold Kipkorir Cheruiyot	Kenya	4:05.91	PB
23	Christoffer Frost Johansen	Denmark	4:06.54	PB
24	Mohamed Attaoui	Spain	4:06.59	PB
25	Gonzalo García	Spain	4:07.81	PB
26	Mohad Abdikadar Sheik Ali	Italy	4:11.60	PB
27	Andrzej Kowalczyk	Poland	4:12.70	PB
28	Olavi Allase	Estonia	4:14.18	PB
29	Deniss Šalkauskas	Estonia	4:16.02	PB
30	Nikita Bogdanovs	Latvia	4:18.90	PB
31	Filip Ostrowski	Poland	4:19.49	PB
32	Jānis Razgalis	Latvia	4:23.08	
33	Robert Heppenstall	Canada	4:27.96	PB
34	Ip Seng Tou	Macau	4:31.44	PB
35	Ethan Yan	Singapore	4:32.44	PB

=== Women's road mile ===
Rank	Nation	Country	Time	Notes
1st place, gold medalist(s)	Diribe Welteji	Ethiopia	4:20.98	WR
2nd place, silver medalist(s)	Freweyni Hailu	Ethiopia	4:23.06	PB
3rd place, bronze medalist(s)	Faith Kipyegon	Kenya	4:24.13	PB
4	Nelly Chepchirchir	Kenya	4:31.18	PB
5	Jessica Hull	Australia	4:32.45	PB
6	Marta Pérez	Spain	4:34.12	PB
7	Berenice Cleyet-Merle	France	4:34.41	PB
8	Nozomi Tanaka	Japan	4:35.32	
9	Addison Wiley	United States	4:36.03	
10	Marissa Damink	Netherlands	4:36.49	PB
11	Charlotte Mouchet	France	4:36.71	PB
12	Glynis Sim	Canada	4:36.81	PB
13	Weronika Lizakowska	Poland	4:37.04	PB
14	Sarah Billings	Australia	4:38.97	PB
15	Carina Viljoen	South Africa	4:39.01	PB
16	Sarah McDonald	Great Britain	4:40.14	SB
17	Helen Schlachtenhaufen	United States	4:40.28	
18	Prisca Chesang	Uganda	4:45.42	PB
19	María Pía Fernández	Uruguay	4:45.81	PB
20	Aleksandra Płocińska	Poland	4:46.50	PB
21	Veronika Sadek	Slovenia	4:47.00	PB
22	Regan Yee	Canada	4:48.31	PB
23	Roza Haile	Eritrea	4:49.43	PB
24	Jaqueline Beatriz Weber	Brazil	4:50.11	NR
25	Gina McNamara	Malta	4:53.54	SB
26	Mia Helene Morck	Denmark	4:54.95	PB
27	Tuuli Tomingas	Estonia	5:09.13	PB
28	Sibilla Vanadziņa	Latvia	5:18.28	PB
29	Romaine Soh Rui-Min	Singapore	5:24.19	PB
	Winnie Nanyondo	Uganda	DNF	

== Championships timetable ==
Friday, September 29	Saturday, September 30	Sunday, October 1
10:00 – 20:00 – World Athletics Road Running Championships EXPO	10:00 – 15:00 Kids’ Day activities 10:00 – 20:00 – World Athletics Road Running Championships EXPO	10:00 – 5 km Mass Race starts (time limit: 1.5 hours) 11:30 – Road Mile Mass Race starts (time limit: 30 minutes) 11:50 – 5 km Women's Elite Race starts 12:15 – 5 km Men's Elite Race starts 13:00 – Road Mile Women's Elite Race starts 13:10 – Road Mile Men's Elite Race starts 13:30 – Half Marathon Women's Elite Race starts 14:15 – Half Marathon Men's Elite + Mass Race starts (time limit: 3 hours) 14:15 – Half Marathon Mass Relay Race starts (time limit: 3 hours)

== Participation ==
A total of 347 athletes were entered for the championships, with 57 teams being represented: 56 nations and the Athlete Refugee Team.

- Angola (1)
- Athlete Refugee Team (4)
- Australia (16)
- Austria (5)
- Azerbaijan (1)
- Belgium (1)
- Bolivia (1)
- Brazil (11)
- Bulgaria (2)
- Burundi (7)
- Canada (12)
- Cape Verde (1)
- Denmark (12)
- Djibouti (3)
- Ecuador (6)
- Eritrea (12)
- Estonia (8)
- Ethiopia (19)
- Finland (1)
- France (13)
- Germany (5)
- Great Britain (12)
- Guinea (2)
- Hong Kong (1)
- Hungary (1)
- Ireland (5)
- Israel (7)
- Italy (8)
- Japan (8)
- Kenya (21)
- Kyrgyzstan (1)
- Latvia (14)
- Lithuania (3)
- Macau (3)
- Malaysia (1)
- Malta (6)
- Mexico (3)
- Morocco (8)
- Netherlands (3)
- New Zealand (7)
- Norway (4)
- Paraguay (1)
- Poland (7)
- Portugal (1)
- Rwanda (2)
- Singapore (9)
- Slovenia (3)
- South Africa (14)
- Spain (5)
- Sweden (4)
- Switzerland (1)
- Tunisia (1)
- Uganda (15)
- Ukraine (3)
- United Arab Emirates (1)
- United States (18)
- Uruguay (3)

== Medal table ==
Rank	Nation	1st place, gold medalist(s)	2nd place, silver medalist(s)	3rd place, bronze medalist(s)	Total
1	Kenya	5	3	4	12
2	Ethiopia	2	4	1	7
3	United States	1	0	1	2
4	Great Britain	0	1	1	2
5	South Africa	0	0	1	1
Overall (after 8 events)		8	8	8	24
