= 2021 European 10,000m Cup =

- Organisers: EAA
- Edition: 24th
- Date: 5 June
- Host city: Birmingham, Great Britain (United Kingdom)
- Venue: University of Birmingham Athletics Track
- Events: 2
- Official website: Official website

The 2021 European 10,000m Cup took place on 5 June 2021 in Birmingham. The races should have taken place on Parliament Hill Athletics Track in London, Great Britain. in conjunction with the Night of the 10,000m PBs in London for the third successive edition but this event was cancelled in January 2021 due to concerns that the Parliament Hill was not yet a coronavirus-secure facility. The event was postponed and moved to the University of Birmingham Athletics Track and combined the British Athletics 10,000m Championships which also served as the qualifying event for the 2020 Summer Olympic Games.

== Medallists ==
Event	Gold	Silver	Bronze
Individual
Men	(France) Morhad Amdouni; 27:23.39 PB	(Belgium) Bashir Abdi; 27:24.41 PB	(Spain) Carlos Mayo; 27:25.00 PB
Women	(United Kingdom) Eilish McColgan; 31:19.35	(Israel) Selamawit Teferi; 31:19.50 PB	(United Kingdom) Jessica Judd; 31:20.96 PB
Team
Men	France; 1:23:16.93	Great Britain; 1:23:33.77	Spain; 1:23:42.64
Women	Great Britain; 1:34:24.01	Italy; Giovanna Epis; Anna Arnaudo; Rebecca Lonedo; Federica Sugamiele; Giovanna Selva	Poland; 1:40:26.05

== Race results ==
=== Men's ===
Individual race
Rank	Heat	Athlete	Nationality	Time	Note
1st place, gold medalist(s)	A	Morhad Amdouni	France	27:23.39	PB
2nd place, silver medalist(s)	A	Bashir Abdi	Belgium	27:24.41	PB
3rd place, bronze medalist(s)	A	Carlos Mayo	Spain	27:25.00	PB
4	A	Nils Voigt	Germany	27:49.04	PB
5	A	Yann Schrub	France	27:49.64	PB
6	A	Jesús Ramos	Spain	27:49.73	PB
7	A	Marc Scott	Great Britain	27:49.94	
8	A	Mo Farah	Great Britain	27:50.64	
9	A	Nekagenet Crippa	Italy	27:51.93	PB
10	A	Emile Cairess	Great Britain	27:53.19	PB
11	A	Mehdi Frère	France	28:03.90	PB
12	A	Hiko Tonosa Haso	Ireland	28:13.10	
13	A	Matt Leach	Great Britain	28:22.33	
14	A	Kristian Jones	Great Britain	28:23.50	PB
15	A	Tadesse Getahon	Israel	28:24.82	
	A	Mohamud Aadan*	Great Britain	28:25.79	PB
16	B	Pietro Riva	Italy	28:25.86	PB
	A	Mahamed Mahamed*	Great Britain	28:26.77	PB
17	A	Juan Antonio Pérez	Spain	28:27.91	
18	A	Florian Carvalho	France	28:35.04	
19	B	Hlynur Andrésson	Iceland	28:36.80	PB
	A	Hugo Milner*	Great Britain	28:36.95	
20	B	Tiidrek Nurme	Estonia	28:37.85	PB
21	A	Alberto Mondazzi	Italy	28:38.97	PB
22	A	Yago Rojo	Spain	28:43.70	
23	B	Lahsene Bouchikhi	Belgium	28:45.30	PB
24	A	Italo Quazzola	Italy	28:50.27	
25	A	Nicolae Alexandru Soare	Romania	28:50.66	
26	B	Jamal Abdelmaji Eisa Mohammed	ART	28:52.64	
27	A	François Barrer	France	28:52.88	
28	B	Mykola Nyzhnyk	Ukraine	28:52.98	
29	B	Archie Casteel	Sweden	28:53.64	PB
30	A	Raul Celada	Spain	28:56.48	
31	B	Björn Koreman	Netherlands	29:06.56	PB
32	A	Ivan Strebkov	Ukraine	29:07.93	
	B	Ellis Cross*	Great Britain	29:10.82	
33	A	Krystian Zalewski	Poland	29:11.48	
34	B	Clément Deflandre	Belgium	29:15.02	PB
35	B	Nicolaï Saké	Belgium	29:19.96	PB
36	B	Miguel Marques	Portugal	29:22.20	
	B	Nigel Martin*	Great Britain	29:22.43	PB
37	A	Iliass Aouani	Italy	29:24.42	
	B	Omar Ahmed*	Great Britain	29:26.22	PB
38	A	Francesco Breusa	Italy	29:28.98	
	B	Joshua Grace*	Great Britain	29:30.22	PB
39	A	Bukayaw Malede	Israel	29:32.50	
	B	Calum Johnson*	Great Britain	29:33.52	
40	A	Roman Romanenko	Ukraine	29:33.58	
41	B	Ihor Porozov	Ukraine	29:33.98	
42	B	Roman Fosti	Estonia	29:40.29	PB
	B	Ollie Lockley*	Great Britain	29:41.40	
43	B	Eero Saleva	Finland	29:47.43	
	B	Jack Gray*	Great Britain	29:58.93	
44	B	Micheal Power	Ireland	30:11.77	
45	B	Mitja Krevs	Slovenia	30:15.86	
46	B	Jáchym Kovář	Czech Republic	30:20.56	
47	A	Fabien Palcau	France	30:24.31	
48	A	Tachlowini Gabriyesos	ART	30:29.91	
49	B	Jānis Višķers	Latvia	30:32.65	PB
50	A	Jorge Blanco	Spain	30:33.28	
51	B	Marek Chrascina	Czech Republic	30:37.50	
	B	Matthew Clowes*	Great Britain	30:40.03	
52	B	Luke Micallef	Malta	31:59.67	PB
	A	Jake Smith	Great Britain	DNF	
	A	Yitayew Abuhay	Israel	DNF	
	A	Samuel Barata	Portugal	DNF	
	A	Tom Anderson*	Great Britain	DNF	
	A	Seán Tobin*	Ireland	DNF	Pace
	A	David McNeill*	Australia	DNF	Pace
	B	Ignas Brasevičius	Lithuania	DNF	
	B	Cormac Dalton	Ireland	DNF	
	B	Paul O'Donnell	Ireland	DNF	
	B	Primož Kobe	Slovenia	DNF	
	B	Fouad Idbafdil	ART	DNF	
	B	Dereje Chekole	Israel	DNF	
	B	Adam Clarke*	Great Britain	DNF	Pace
	B	Tom Marshall*	Great Britain	DNF	Pace
	B	Timon Theuer	Austria	DNS	

Teams
Rank	Team	Time	Note
1st place, gold medalist(s)	France	1:23:16.93	
2nd place, silver medalist(s)	Great Britain	1:23:33.77	
3rd place, bronze medalist(s)	Spain	1:23:42.64	
4	Italy	1:24:56.76	
5	Belgium	1:25:24.73	
6	Ukraine	1:27:34.49	

=== Women's ===
Individual race
Rank	Heat	Athlete	Nationality	Time	Note
1st place, gold medalist(s)	A	Eilish McColgan	Great Britain	31:19.35	
2nd place, silver medalist(s)	A	Selamawit Teferi	Israel	31:19.50	PB
3rd place, bronze medalist(s)	A	Jessica Judd	Great Britain	31:20.96	PB
4	A	Verity Ockenden	Great Britain	31:43.70	PB
5	A	Amy-Eloise Markovc	Great Britain	32:04.38	
6	A	Luiza Gega	Albania	32:16.25	PB
	A	Charlotte Arter*	Great Britain	32:17.40	
7	A	Susan Jeptooo	France	32:31.80	PB
8	A	Samantha Harrison	Great Britain	32:31.80	
9	A	Maitane Melero	Spain	32:41.34	
10	A	Izabela Paszkiewicz	Poland	32:44.20	PB
11	A	Jennifer Nesbitt	Great Britain	32:48.67	
12	A	Jasmijn Lau	Netherlands	32:53.93	
	A	Beth Kidger*	Great Britain	32:54.75	
13	B	Tereza Hrochová	Czech Republic	33:00.00	PB
14	A	Giovanna Epis	Italy	33:02.23	
15	B	Anna Arnaudo	Italy	33:02.70	PB
	A	Mhairi Maclennan*	Great Britain	33:02.71	
16	A	Lizzie Lee	Ireland	33:04.66	PB
	A	Eleanor Bolton*	Great Britain	33:04.70	
17	A	Mélody Julien	France	33:10.61	PB
	A	Hannah Irwin*	Great Britain	33:11.08	PB
18	B	Angelika Mach	Poland	33:26.69	PB
19	B	Rebecca Lonedo	Italy	33:27.56	PB
20	B	Jekaterina Patjuk	Estonia	33:29.10	PB
21	B	Ine Bakken	Norway	33:34.59	PB
	A	Clara Evans*	Great Britain	33:39.19	
22	A	Nina Lauwaert	Belgium	33:45.80	
23	A	Hanne Mjøen Maridal	Norway	33:48.61	
24	A	Marta Galimany	Spain	34:05.87	
25	B	Federica Sugamiele	Italy	34:08.12	PB
	A	Kate Avery*	Great Britain	34:14.57	
26	A	Anna Bańkowska	Poland	34:15.16	
	B	Sally Ratcliffe*	Great Britain	34:39.68	
	B	Meghan Ryan*	Great Britain	34:46.46	
27	A	Iwona Bernardelli	Poland	34:49.99	
28	B	Karen Van Proeyen	Belgium	34:57.27	PB
	B	Annabel Gummow*	Great Britain	35:17.11	
29	B	Neja Kršinar	Slovenia	35:23.25	
30	B	Vaida Žūsinaitė	Lithuania	35:31.44	
	B	Elisha Tait*	Great Britain	35:40.54	
31	B	Lisa Marie Bezzina	Malta	35:43.97	
	B	Kate Drew*	Great Britain	36:36.99	
	B	Elizabeth Renondeau*	Great Britain	37:10.61	
	B	Verity Hopkins*	Great Britain	37:21.69	
	A	Natasha Cockram*	Great Britain	DNF	
	A	Renata Pliś	Poland	DNF	
	A	Samira Mezeghrane-Saad	France	DNF	
	A	Michelle Finn*	Ireland	DNF	Pace
	A	Allison Cash*	United States	DNF	Pace
	B	Sarah Astin*	Great Britain	DNF	
	B	Nicole Taylor*	Great Britain	DNF	
	B	Becky Briggs*	Great Britain	DNF	
	B	Julia Mayer	Austria	DNF	
	B	Giovanna Selva	Italy	DNF	
	B	Kate Seary*	Great Britain	DNF	Pace
	B	Rebecca Murray*	Great Britain	DNF	Pace
	B	Saskia Millard*	Great Britain	DNF	Pace
	A	Hanna Lindholm	Sweden	DNS	
	B	Martina Merlo	Italy	DNS	

Teams
Rank	Team	Time	Note
1st place, gold medalist(s)	Great Britain	1:34:24.01	
2nd place, silver medalist(s)	Italy	1:39:32.49	
3rd place, bronze medalist(s)	Poland	1:40:26.05	

* Athletes who competed in the British Athletics 10,000m Championships but were not entered for the European Cup. The results of these athletes were not counted towards the final team score.
