= 2020 World Athletics Half Marathon Championships =

- Host city: Gdynia, Poland
- Events: 2
- Dates: 17 October 2020
- Race length: 21.0975 km (13.1 mi)

The 2020 World Athletics Half Marathon Championships, originally scheduled for 29 March 2020 in Gdynia, Poland, was postponed until 17 October 2020, due to the coronavirus pandemic.

On 31 August 2020, the mass participation race was cancelled, while the elite championships remained scheduled.

== Medalists ==
Event	Gold		Silver		Bronze	
Individual
Men	Jacob Kiplimo (UGA)	58:49	Kibiwott Kandie (KEN)	58:54	Amedework Walelegn (ETH)	59:08
Women	Peres Jepchirchir (KEN)	1:05:16	Melat Yisak Kejeta (GER)	1:05:18	Yalemzerf Yehualaw (ETH)	1:05:19
Team
Men	Kenya	2:58:10	Ethiopia	2:58:25	Uganda	2:58:39
Women	Ethiopia	3:16:39	Kenya	3:18:10	Germany	3:28:42

== Race results ==
=== Men ===
Rank	Athlete	Nationality	Time	Notes
1st place, gold medalist(s)	Jacob Kiplimo	Uganda	58:49	CR
2nd place, silver medalist(s)	Kibiwott Kandie	Kenya	58:54	
3rd place, bronze medalist(s)	Amedework Walelegn	Ethiopia	59:08	PB
4	Joshua Cheptegei	Uganda	59:21	PB
5	Andamlak Belihu	Ethiopia	59:32	SB
6	Leonard Barsoton	Kenya	59:34	SB
7	Stephen Mokoka	South Africa	59:36	NR
8	Morhad Amdouni	France	59:40	NR
9	Benard Kimeli	Kenya	59:42	SB
10	Leul Gebresilase	Ethiopia	59:45	SB
11	Hailemaryam Kiros	Ethiopia	1:00:01	PB
12	Hamza Sahli	Morocco	1:00:04	PB
13	Mohamed Reda El Aaraby	Morocco	1:00:17	PB
14	Lesiba Precious Mashele	South Africa	1:00:24	PB
15	Mouhcine Outalha	Morocco	1:00:26	PB
16	Victor Kiplangat	Uganda	1:00:29	SB
17	Othmane El Goumri	Morocco	1:00:30	PB
18	Jake Smith	Great Britain	1:00:31	PB
19	Stephen Kissa	Uganda	1:00:34	
20	Bohdan-Ivan Horodyskyy	Ukraine	1:00:40	NR
21	Julien Wanders	Switzerland	1:00:46	SB
22	Guye Idemo Adola	Ethiopia	1:00:50	SB
23	Collen Mulaudzi	South Africa	1:00:51	PB
24	Aras Kaya	Turkey	1:00:51	PB
25	Tadesse Getahon	Israel	1:00:52	NR
26	Eyob Faniel	Italy	1:00:53	PB
27	Florian Carvalho	France	1:00:58	PB
28	Marhu Teferi	Israel	1:00:58	SB
29	José Luis Santana	Mexico	1:01:11	PB
30	Juan Pacheco	Mexico	1:01:20	PB
31	Ayad Lamdassem	Spain	1:01:21	PB
32	Benjamin Choquert	France	1:01:32	PB
33	Carlos Díaz	Chile	1:01:32	NR
34	Krystian Zalewski	Poland	1:01:32	NR
35	Simon Boch	Germany	1:01:36	PB
36	Juan Antonio Pérez	Spain	1:01:39	SB
37	David Nilsson	Sweden	1:01:40	PB
38	Hassan Toriss	Morocco	1:01:42	PB
39	Girmaw Amare	Israel	1:02:03	PB
40	Samuel Barata	Portugal	1:02:19	PB
41	Tiidrek Nurme	Estonia	1:02:20	NR
42	Benard Kipkorir Ngeno	Kenya	1:02:26	
43	Pietro Riva	Italy	1:02:28	SB
44	Stefano La Rosa	Italy	1:02:28	PB
45	Nicolas Navarro	France	1:02:29	PB
46	Adel Mechaal	Spain	1:02:30	PB
47	Morris Munene Gachaga	Kenya	1:02:30	SB
48	Iván Darío González	Colombia	1:02:31	PB
49	Daniele D'Onofrio	Italy	1:02:32	PB
50	Mohamud Ibrahim Aadan	Great Britain	1:02:41	SB
51	Tadesse Abraham	Switzerland	1:02:46	SB
52	Hlynur Andrésson	Iceland	1:02:47	NR
53	Mikael Ekvall	Sweden	1:02:48	SB
54	Kaan Kigen Özbilen	Turkey	1:02:53	SB
55	Emil Millán de la Oliva	Sweden	1:02:53	PB
56	Segundo Jami	Ecuador	1:02:57	PB
57	Abderrazak Charik	France	1:02:58	
58	Kevin Seaward	Ireland	1:02:58	PB
59	Roman Fosti	Estonia	1:03:03	PB
60	Kristian Jones	Great Britain	1:03:05	PB
61	Polat Kemboi Arikan	Turkey	1:03:10	SB
62	Adam Craig	Great Britain	1:03:12	PB
63	Nicolae Soare	Romania	1:03:14	PB
64	Tom Evans	Great Britain	1:03:14	PB
65	Sezgin Ataç	Turkey	1:03:21	
66	Roman Romanenko	Ukraine	1:03:26	SB
67	Otmane Nait Hammou	Athlete Refugee Team	1:03:28	NR
68	Maxim Răileanu	Moldova	1:03:34	PB
69	Saffet Elkatmiş	Turkey	1:03:34	PB
70	Hugh Armstrong	Ireland	1:03:37	PB
71	Oleksandr Sitkovskyy	Ukraine	1:03:41	PB
72	Jean Marie Vianney Niyomukiza	Burundi	1:03:43	PB
73	Koen Naert	Belgium	1:03:44	SB
74	Simon Holbek Kønigsfeldt	Denmark	1:03:48	PB
75	Gilmar Lopes	Brazil	1:03:51	SB
76	Moses Kibet	Uganda	1:03:54	SB
77	Joaquín Arbe	Argentina	1:03:55	SB
78	Luís Saraiva	Portugal	1:03:56	PB
79	Álvaro Abreu	Dominican Republic	1:03:58	NR
80	Timon Theuer	Austria	1:03:59	
81	Nicolás Cuestas	Uruguay	1:04:00	SB
82	Remigijus Kančys	Lithuania	1:04:00	NR
83	Adhanom Abraha	Sweden	1:04:02	SB
84	Iraitz Arrospide	Spain	1:04:07	
85	Iván Zarco	Honduras	1:04:08	NR
86	Ignas Brasevičius	Lithuania	1:04:09	PB
87	Thijs Nijhuis	Denmark	1:04:10	SB
88	Christian Steinhammer	Austria	1:04:11	
89	Luis Orta	Venezuela	1:04:11	
90	Ederson Pereira	Brazil	1:04:19	SB
91	Yitayew Abuhay	Israel	1:04:21	PB
92	Igor Olefirenko	Ukraine	1:04:22	SB
93	Daniel do Nascimento	Brazil	1:04:27	PB
94	Andreas Lommer	Denmark	1:04:28	
95	Adam Nowicki	Poland	1:04:31	SB
96	Jesús Arturo Esparza	Mexico	1:04:35	PB
97	Konstantin Wedel	Germany	1:04:45	
98	Christian Vásconez	Ecuador	1:04:49	PB
99	Marvin Blanco	Venezuela	1:05:06	PB
100	Amanal Petros	Germany	1:05:22	
101	Damian Kabat	Poland	1:05:26	PB
102	Valdas Dopolskas	Lithuania	1:05:28	PB
103	Jorge Blanco	Spain	1:05:31	
104	Tobias Blum	Germany	1:05:33	
105	Jeison Suárez	Colombia	1:05:42	SB
106	Adam Głogowski	Poland	1:05:50	
107	Nuno Lopes	Portugal	1:06:30	
108	Fouad Idbafdil	Athlete Refugee Team	1:06:35	PB
109	Bayron Piedra	Ecuador	1:06:45	SB
110	Wan Chun Wong	Hong Kong	1:06:58	PB
111	Rafael Loza	Ecuador	1:08:30	
112	Oscar Antonio Aldana	El Salvador	1:08:31	NR
113	Valentin Betoudji	Chad	1:08:46	PB
114	Charlton Debono	Malta	1:08:51	SB
115	Stefan Azzopardi	Malta	1:09:18	PB
116	Sonny Folcheri	Monaco	1:16:01	PB
117	Ilir Këllezi	Albania	1:17:27	SB
	Arnar Pétursson	Iceland	DNF	
	Nekagenet Crippa	Italy	DNF	
	Rui Pinto	Portugal	DNF	
	Napoleon Solomon	Sweden	DNF	
	Ayala Gashau	Israel	DNS	

=== Women ===
Rank	Athlete	Nationality	Time	Notes
1st place, gold medalist(s)	Peres Jepchirchir	Kenya	1:05:16	WR_{wo}
2nd place, silver medalist(s)	Melat Yisak Kejeta	Germany	1:05:18	AR_{wo}
3rd place, bronze medalist(s)	Yalemzerf Yehualaw	Ethiopia	1:05:19	PB
4	Zeineba Yimer	Ethiopia	1:05:39	PB
5	Ababel Yeshaneh	Ethiopia	1:05:41	
6	Joyciline Jepkosgei	Kenya	1:05:58	SB
7	Yasemin Can	Turkey	1:06:20	NR
8	Netsanet Gudeta	Ethiopia	1:06:46	SB
9	Brillian Jepkorir Kipkoech	Kenya	1:06:56	PB
10	Rosemary Wanjiru	Kenya	1:07:10	
11	Dorcas Jepchumba Kimeli	Kenya	1:07:55	
12	Lonah Chemtai Salpeter	Israel	1:08:31	SB
13	Fabienne Schlumpf	Switzerland	1:08:38	NR
14	Juliet Chekwel	Uganda	1:08:44	NR
15	Sisay Meseret Gola	Ethiopia	1:09:02	PB
16	Glenrose Xaba	South Africa	1:09:26	PB
17	Doreen Chemutai	Uganda	1:10:18	PB
18	Charlotta Fougberg	Sweden	1:10:19	PB
19	Úrsula Sánchez	Mexico	1:10:19	PB
20	Andrea Ramírez	Mexico	1:10:20	PB
21	Daniela Torres	Mexico	1:10:22	PB
22	Florencia Borelli	Argentina	1:10:30	NR
23	Yevheniya Prokofyeva	Ukraine	1:10:32	PB
24	Brenda Flores	Mexico	1:10:36	PB
25	Sofiia Yaremchuk	Ukraine	1:10:42	
26	Laura Hottenrott	Germany	1:10:49	PB
27	Fortunate Chidzivo	Zimbabwe	1:10:50	NR
28	Izabela Paszkiewicz	Poland	1:10:52	PB
29	Katarzyna Jankowska	Poland	1:11:02	PB
30	Doreen Chesang	Uganda	1:11:04	PB
31	Susan Kipsang Jeptooo	France	1:11:06	SB
32	Angelika Mach	Poland	1:11:07	PB
33	Marta Galimany	Spain	1:11:08	PB
34	Moira Stewartová	Czech Republic	1:11:08	PB
35	Bojana Bjeljac	Croatia	1:11:12	PB
36	Giovanna Epis	Italy	1:11:14	PB
37	Carolina Wikström	Sweden	1:11:31	PB
38	Nina Lauwaert	Belgium	1:11:33	PB
39	Sara Moreira	Portugal	1:11:39	SB
40	Valeria Straneo	Italy	1:11:39	
41	Samira Mezeghrane	France	1:11:40	PB
42	Ann Marie McGlynn	Ireland	1:11:40	PB
43	Hanna Lindholm	Sweden	1:11:47	PB
44	Andrea Bonilla	Ecuador	1:11:48	PB
45	Daiana Ocampo	Argentina	1:11:50	PB
46	Francine Niyomukunzi	Burundi	1:11:50	PB
47	Samantha Harrison	Great Britain	1:11:53	
48	Angie Orjuela	Colombia	1:12:07	PB
49	Kit Ching Yiu	Hong Kong	1:12:10	
50	Tereza Hrochová	Czech Republic	1:12:13	PB
51	Aleksandra Lisowska	Poland	1:12:16	PB
52	Esma Aydemir	Turkey	1:12:22	SB
53	Maor Tiyouri	Israel	1:12:27	PB
54	Rabea Schöneborn	Germany	1:12:35	
55	Deborah Schöneborn	Germany	1:12:39	
56	Elena Loyo	Spain	1:12:44	
57	Rachael Zena Chebet	Uganda	1:12:50	
58	Melody Julien	France	1:12:51	PB
59	Fatma Demir	Turkey	1:12:57	PB
60	Olga Skrypak	Ukraine	1:12:58	SB
61	Laura Mendez	Spain	1:12:58	PB
62	Maria Chiara Cascavilla	Italy	1:13:01	PB
63	Jekaterina Patjuk	Estonia	1:13:08	PB
64	Becky Briggs	Great Britain	1:13:08	PB
65	Clara Evans	Great Britain	1:13:11	
66	Vendula Frintová	Czech Republic	1:13:16	PB
67	Lilia Fisikovici	Moldova	1:13:32	SB
68	Federica Sugamiele	Italy	1:13:38	
69	Roxana Elisabeta Rotaru	Romania	1:13:45	PB
70	Monika Bytautienė	Lithuania	1:13:50	PB
71	Liliana Maria Dragomir	Romania	1:14:02	PB
72	Marcela Cristina Gomes	Argentina	1:14:18	PB
73	Marcela Joglová	Czech Republic	1:14:30	
74	Beverly Ramos	Puerto Rico	1:14:39	SB
75	Thalia Charalambous	Cyprus	1:14:40	NR
76	Andreia Hessel	Brazil	1:14:41	PB
77	Karen Ehrenreich	Denmark	1:14:45	PB
78	Katerine Tisalema	Ecuador	1:14:59	
79	Loreta Kančytė	Lithuania	1:15:15	PB
80	Elisa Stefani	Italy	1:15:16	
81	Rosa Chacha	Ecuador	1:15:27	SB
82	Jéssica Augusto	Portugal	1:15:29	SB
83	Elena Adelina Panaet	Romania	1:15:33	PB
84	Fanny Pruvost	France	1:15:34	
85	Tetyana Vernihor	Ukraine	1:16:22	SB
86	Victoria Schenk	Austria	1:16:36	SB
87	Fabienne Königstein	Germany	1:17:03	
88	Tatyana Neroznak	Kazakhstan	1:17:07	PB
89	Andrea Kolbeinsdóttir	Iceland	1:17:52	PB
90	Tania Chavez Moser	Bolivia	1:17:53	PB
91	Lina Kiriliuk	Lithuania	1:18:31	PB
92	Stella Christoforou	Cyprus	1:18:42	PB
93	Lisa Marie Bezzina	Malta	1:18:43	PB
94	Valdilene Silva	Brazil	1:18:58	SB
95	Adela Paulina Baltoi	Romania	1:19:02	SB
96	Tsz Ying Vut	Hong Kong	1:19:08	PB
97	Joelle Cortis	Malta	1:19:28	PB
98	Idelma Delgado	El Salvador	1:21:01	PB
99	Andrijana Pop Arsova	North Macedonia	1:22:18	
100	Lorena Sosa	Uruguay	1:22:38	SB
101	Elín Edda Sigurðardóttir	Iceland	1:24:20	
	Annemari Kiekara	Finland	DNF	
	Adriana Nelson	Romania	DNF	
	Hiruni Kesara Wijayaratne	Sri Lanka	DNF	
	Sarah Lahti	Sweden	DNS	

== Team standings ==
=== Men ===
Rank	Country	Time
1st place, gold medalist(s)	Kenya	2:58:10
2nd place, silver medalist(s)	Ethiopia	2:58:25
3rd place, bronze medalist(s)	Uganda	2:58:39
4	Morocco	3:00:47
5	South Africa	3:00:51
6	France	3:02:10
7	Israel	3:03:53
8	Spain	3:05:30
9	Italy	3:05:49
10	Great Britain	3:06:17
11	Turkey	3:06:54
12	Mexico	3:07:06
13	Sweden	3:07:21
14	Ukraine	3:07:47
15	Poland	3:11:29
16	Germany	3:11:43
17	Denmark	3:12:26
18	Brazil	3:12:37
19	Portugal	3:12:45
20	Lithuania	3:13:37
21	Ecuador	3:14:31

=== Women ===
Rank	Country	Time
1st place, gold medalist(s)	Ethiopia	3:16:39
2nd place, silver medalist(s)	Kenya	3:18:10
3rd place, bronze medalist(s)	Germany	3:28:42
4	Uganda	3:30:06
5	Mexico	3:31:01
6	Turkey	3:31:39
7	Poland	3:33:01
8	Sweden	3:33:37
9	Ukraine	3:34:12
10	France	3:35:37
11	Italy	3:35:54
12	Czech Republic	3:36:37
13	Argentina	3:36:38
14	Spain	3:36:50
15	Great Britain	3:38:12
16	Ecuador	3:42:14
17	Romania	3:43:20
18	Lithuania	3:47:36
