= Athletics at the 2020 Summer Olympics – Women's marathon =

Women's marathon at the Games of the XXXII Olympiad
- Olympic Athletics
- Venue: Sapporo
- Date: 7 August 2021
- Competitors: 88 from 44 nations
- Winning time: 2:27:20

Medalists
1st place, gold medalist(s)		Peres Jepchirchir	Kenya
2nd place, silver medalist(s)		Brigid Kosgei	Kenya
3rd place, bronze medalist(s)		Molly Seidel	United States

The women's marathon event at the 2020 Summer Olympics started at 06:00 on 7 August 2021 in Sapporo. Peres Jepchirchir of Kenya won gold in 2:27:20 followed by world record holder and Kenyan teammate Brigid Kosgei with silver, and American Molly Seidel winning the bronze medal in her third-ever marathon.

The race was moved north, from Tokyo to Sapporo because the latter is on average 4 °C (7 °F) cooler in August, as decided in 2019 by the IOC. The start had been moved an hour earlier to 06:00 for the same reason. The two cities turned out to have almost the same temperature, as Sapporo recorded 25 °C (77 °F) at 06:00 when the race started and 29 °C (84 °F) at 08:30.

The gifts for the competition were presented by Sebastian Coe, United Kingdom; World Athletics President.

== Background ==
This was the 10th appearance of the event, having appeared at every Olympics since 1984.

== Qualification ==
This was the 10th appearance of the event, having appeared at every Olympics since 1984. Eighty-eight athletes competed.

A National Olympic Committee (NOC) could enter up to three athletes in the women's marathon if all athletes met the entry standard or qualify by ranking during the qualifying period (the qualification period for "Entry Standard" (2:29:30) was from 1 January 2019 to 31 May 2021, with a maximum quota per NOC of 3.). The limit of 3 has been in place since the 1930 Olympic Congress.

The standard was "set for the sole purpose of qualifying athletes with exceptional performances unable to qualify through the IAAF World Rankings pathway." Runners in the top 10 at the 2019 world championship, the top 5 at any IAAF Gold Label marathon, and the top 10 at the Marathon Major Series were deemed to have met the qualifying standard, regardless of actual time. The world rankings, based on the average of the best five results for the athlete over the qualifying period and weighted by the importance of the meet, will then be used to qualify athletes until the cap of 80 is reached. More than 80 athletes (after application of the 3 per NOC rule) have met the qualifying standard.

To be a qualifying performance, the course had to have been certified in the last five years by a Grade A or Grade B road course measurer. In order to be eligible for the qualifying standard time, the elevation decrease could not be more than 1 metre per kilometre. For world rankings, the elevation decrease could exceed that rate, but a correction would be made to the score.

The qualifying period was originally from 1 January 2019 to 31 May 2020. Due to the COVID-19 pandemic, the period was suspended from 6 April 2020 to 30 November 2020, with the end date extended to 31 May 2021. The world rankings period start date was also changed from 1 January 2019 to 1 December 2018. The qualifying time standards could be obtained in various meets during the given period that have the approval of the IAAF. The most recent Area Championships may be counted in the ranking, even if not during the qualifying period. In July 2020, World Athletics announced that the suspension period would be lifted for the road events (marathons and race walks) on 1 September 2020.

NOCs can also use their universality place—each NOC can enter one female athlete regardless of time if they had no female athletes meeting the entry standard for an athletics event—in the marathon.

=== Women's Marathon ===
The 2016 Olympics champion Kenyan Jemima Sumgong did not defend her title due to a doping suspension.

Qualification standard	No. of athletes	NOC	Nominated athletes
Entry standard – 2:29:30	3	Australia	Sinead Diver; Ellie Pashley; Lisa Jane Weightman
Entry standard – 2:29:30	2	Bahrain	Eunice Chumba; Tejitu Daba
Entry standard – 2:29:30	3	Canada	Malindi Elmore; Dayna Pidhoresky; Natasha Wodak
Entry standard – 2:29:30	3	China	Bai Li; Li Zhixuan; Zhang Deshun
Entry standard – 2:29:30	3	Czech Republic	Tereza Hrochová; Marcela Joglová; Eva Vrabcová-Nývltová
Entry standard – 2:29:30	3	Ethiopia	Roza Dereje; Birhane Dibaba; Zeineba Yimer
Entry standard – 2:29:30	3	Germany	Melat Yisak Kejeta; Deborah Schöneborn; Katharina Steinruck
Entry standard – 2:29:30	3	Great Britain	Stephanie Davis; Jess Piasecki; Stephanie Twell
Entry standard – 2:29:30	3	Japan	Mao Ichiyama; Honami Maeda; Ayuko Suzuki
Entry standard – 2:29:30	3	Kenya	Ruth Chepng'etich; Peres Jepchirchir; Brigid Kosgei
Entry standard – 2:29:30	3	Mexico	Andrea Ramírez Limón; Úrsula Sánchez; Daniela Torres Huerta
Entry standard – 2:29:30	1	Morocco	Rkia El Moukim; ~~Souad Kanbouchia~~; ~~Majida Maayouf~~
Entry standard – 2:29:30	2	Netherlands	Andrea Deelstra; Jill Holterman; ~~Ruth van der Meijden~~
Entry standard – 2:29:30	0	~~North Korea~~	~~Jo Un-ok~~; ~~Kim Ji-hyang~~; ~~Ri Kwang-ok~~
Entry standard – 2:29:30	3	Poland	Aleksandra Lisowska; Angelika Mach; Karolina Jarzyńska
Entry standard – 2:29:30	3	Portugal	Sara Moreira; Catarina Ribeiro; Carla Salomé Rocha
Entry standard – 2:29:30	3	Spain	Marta Galimany; Elena Loyo; Laura Méndez Esquer
Entry standard – 2:29:30	1	Sweden	Carolina Wikström; ~~Charlotta Fougberg~~; ~~Hanna Lindholm~~
Entry standard – 2:29:30	3	Ukraine	Viktoriia Kaliuzhna; Darya Mykhaylova; Yevheniya Prokofyeva
Entry standard – 2:29:30	3	United States	Sally Kipyego; Molly Seidel; Aliphine Tuliamuk
Entry standard – 2:29:30	2	Belarus	Volha Mazuronak; Nina Savina
Entry standard – 2:29:30	2	Belgium	Mieke Gorissen; Hanne Verbruggen
Entry standard – 2:29:30	2	Croatia	Bojana Bjeljac; Matea Parlov Koštro
Entry standard – 2:29:30	2	Ecuador	Andrea Bonilla; Rosa Chacha
Entry standard – 2:29:30	2	Eritrea	Kokob Tesfagabriel; Nazret Weldu
Entry standard – 2:29:30	2	Ireland	Aoife Cooke; Fionnuala McCormack
Entry standard – 2:29:30	2	Israel	Lonah Chemtai Salpeter; Maor Tiyouri
Entry standard – 2:29:30	1	Italy	~~Sara Dossena~~; Giovanna Epis
Entry standard – 2:29:30	1	Kyrgyzstan	~~Iuliia Andreeva~~; Darya Maslova
Entry standard – 2:29:30	2	Peru	Jovana de la Cruz; Gladys Tejeda
Entry standard – 2:29:30	0	ROC	~~Marina Kovalyova~~; ~~Sardana Trofimova~~
Entry standard – 2:29:30	2	South Africa	Gerda Steyn; Irvette van Zyl
Entry standard – 2:29:30	2	South Korea	Ahn Seul-ki; Choi Kyung-sun
Entry standard – 2:29:30	2	Uganda	Juliet Chekwel; Immaculate Chemutai
Entry standard – 2:29:30	1	Argentina	Marcela Cristina Gómez
Entry standard – 2:29:30	1	Colombia	Angie Orjuela
Entry standard – 2:29:30	1	France	Susan Jeptooo Kipsang
Entry standard – 2:29:30	1	Kazakhstan	Zhanna Mamazhanova
Entry standard – 2:29:30	1	Lesotho	Neheng Khatala
Entry standard – 2:29:30	1	Moldova	Lilia Fisikovici
Entry standard – 2:29:30	1	Mongolia	Bayartsogtyn Mönkhzayaa
Entry standard – 2:29:30	1	Namibia	Helalia Johannes
Entry standard – 2:29:30	1	Switzerland	Fabienne Schlumpf
Entry standard – 2:29:30	1	Tanzania	Failuna Abdi Matanga
Entry standard – 2:29:30	1	Turkey	Meryem Erdoğan
Finishing position at designated competitions	0	Belarus	~~Nastassia Ivanova~~
Finishing position at designated competitions	0	Belgium	~~Nina Lauwaert~~
Finishing position at designated competitions	0	New Zealand	~~Alice Mason~~
Finishing position at designated competitions	0	Rwanda	~~Salomé Nyirarukundo~~
Finishing position at designated competitions	1	Switzerland	Martina Strähl
World ranking	0		
Universality Places	1	Solomon Islands	Sharon Firisua
Total	91		

== Competition format and course ==
As for all Olympic marathons, the competition is a single race. The marathon distance of 26 miles, 385 yards (42.195 kilometers) was run over a course that started with two laps around Odori Park. The route next made a large loop (about half the marathon's length) through the streets of Sapporo, passing by Nakajima Park, Sapporo TV Tower, and Hokkaido University, and crossing the Toyohira River twice. The race then took two laps around a smaller (approximately 6.2 miles (10.0 km)) section of the large loop. The finish line was back at Odori Park.

== Records ==
The existing world, Olympic and area records were left untouched by this race due to its harsh conditions:

World record	Brigid Kosgei (KEN)	2:14:04	Chicago, United States	13 October 2019
Olympic record	Tiki Gelana (ETH)	2:23:07	London, United Kingdom	5 August 2012

Area	Time	Athlete	Nation
Africa (records)	2:14:04 WR	Brigid Kosgei	Kenya
Asia (records)	2:19:12	Mizuki Noguchi	Japan
Europe (records)	2:15:25	Paula Radcliffe	Great Britain
North, Central America and Caribbean (records)	2:19:36	Deena Kastor	United States
Oceania (records)	2:22:36	Benita Johnson	Australia
South America (records)	2:26:17	Yolanda Caballero	Colombia

== Schedule ==
All times are Japan Standard Time (UTC+9)

The women's marathon took place on a single day.

Date	Time	Round
Saturday, 7 August 2021	6:00	Final

== Results ==
Rank	Athlete	Nation	Time	Time Behind	Notes
1st place, gold medalist(s)	Peres Jepchirchir	Kenya	2:27:20		SB
2nd place, silver medalist(s)	Brigid Kosgei	Kenya	2:27:36	+0:16	SB
3rd place, bronze medalist(s)	Molly Seidel	United States	2:27:46	+0:26	SB
4	Roza Dereje	Ethiopia	2:28:38	+1:18	SB
5	Volha Mazuronak	Belarus	2:29:06	+1:46	SB
6	Melat Yisak Kejeta	Germany	2:29:16	+1:56	SB
7	Eunice Chumba	Bahrain	2:29:36	+2:16	
8	Mao Ichiyama	Japan	2:30:13	+2:53	
9	Malindi Elmore	Canada	2:30:59	+3:39	SB
10	Sinead Diver	Australia	2:31:14	+3:54	SB
11	Helalia Johannes	Namibia	2:31:22	+4:02	SB
12	Fabienne Schlumpf	Switzerland	2:31:36	+4:16	
13	Natasha Wodak	Canada	2:31:41	+4:21	SB
14	Karolina Jarzyńska	Poland	2:32:04	+4:44	SB
15	Gerda Steyn	South Africa	2:32:10	+4:50	
16	Immaculate Chemutai	Uganda	2:32:23	+5:03	
17	Sally Kipyego	United States	2:32:53	+5:33	SB
18	Deborah Schöneborn	Germany	2:33:08	+5:48	SB
19	Ayuko Suzuki	Japan	2:33:14	+5:54	SB
20	Neheng Khatala	Lesotho	2:33:15	+5:55	
21	Matea Parlov Koštro	Croatia	2:33:18	+5:58	SB
22	Carolina Wikström	Sweden	2:33:19	+5:59	SB
23	Ellie Pashley	Australia	2:33:39	+6:19	SB
24	Failuna Abdi Matanga	Tanzania	2:33:58	+6:38	SB
25	Fionnuala McCormack	Ireland	2:34:09	+6:49	SB
26	Lisa Jane Weightman	Australia	2:34:19	+6:59	SB
27	Gladys Tejeda	Peru	2:34:21	+7:01	SB
28	Mieke Gorissen	Belgium	2:34:24	+7:04	
29	Elena Loyo	Spain	2:34:38	+7:18	SB
30	Carla Salomé Rocha	Portugal	2:34:52	+7:32	SB
31	Katharina Steinruck	Germany	2:35:00	+7:40	
32	Giovanna Epis	Italy	2:35:09	+7:49	SB
33	Honami Maeda	Japan	2:35:28	+8:08	
34	Choi Kyung-sun	South Korea	2:35:33	+8:13	SB
35	Aleksandra Lisowska	Poland	2:35:33	+8:13	
36	Darya Maslova	Kyrgyzstan	2:35:35	+8:15	SB
37	Marta Galimany	Spain	2:35:39	+8:19	SB
38	Susan Jeptooo Kipsang	France	2:36:29	+9:09	SB
39	Stephanie Davis	Great Britain	2:36:33	+9:13	
40	Jovana de la Cruz	Peru	2:36:38	+9:18	
41	Rosa Chacha	Ecuador	2:36:44	+9:24	
42	Yevheniya Prokofyeva	Ukraine	2:36:47	+9:27	SB
43	Nazret Weldu	Eritrea	2:37:01	+9:41	
44	Andrea Deelstra	Netherlands	2:37:05	+9:45	SB
45	Bayartsogtyn Mönkhzayaa	Mongolia	2:37:08	+9:48	SB
46	Zhanna Mamazhanova	Kazakhstan	2:37:42	+10:22	
47	Zhang Deshun	China	2:37:45	+10:25	
48	Maor Tiyouri	Israel	2:37:52	+10:32	
49	Hanne Verbruggen	Belgium	2:38:03	+10:43	SB
50	Nina Savina	Belarus	2:38:41	+11:21	SB
51	Martina Strähl	Switzerland	2:39:25	+12:05	SB
52	Marcela Joglová	Czech Republic	2:39:29	+12:09	
53	Bojana Bjeljac	Croatia	2:39:32	+12:12	SB
54	Lilia Fisikovici	Moldova	2:39:59	+12:39	SB
55	Angie Orjuela	Colombia	2:40:04	+12:44	SB
56	Rkia El Moukim	Morocco	2:40:10	+12:50	SB
57	Ahn Seul-ki	South Korea	2:41:11	+13:51	SB
58	Tereza Hrochová	Czech Republic	2:42:25	+15:05	
59	Angelika Mach	Poland	2:42:26	+15:06	
60	Andrea Bonilla	Ecuador	2:43:30	+16:10	SB
61	Marcela Cristina Gómez	Argentina	2:44:09	+16:49	SB
62	Li Zhixuan	China	2:45:23	+18:03	
63	Jill Holterman	Netherlands	2:45:27	+18:07	
64	Úrsula Sánchez	Mexico	2:45:45	+18:25	SB
65	Daniela Torres Huerta	Mexico	2:47:15	+19:55	
66	Lonah Chemtai Salpeter	Israel	2:48:31	+21:11	
67	Bai Li	China	2:49:21	+22:01	
68	Stephanie Twell	Great Britain	2:53:26	+26:06	SB
69	Juliet Chekwel	Uganda	2:53:40	+26:20	SB
70	Catarina Ribeiro	Portugal	2:55:01	+27:41	SB
71	Jess Piasecki	Great Britain	2:55:39	+28:19	SB
72	Sharon Firisua	Solomon Islands	3:02:10	+34:50	NR
73	Dayna Pidhoresky	Canada	3:03:10	+35:50	SB
–	Andrea Ramírez Limón	Mexico	–	35 km	DNF
–	Ruth Chepng'etich	Kenya	–	30 km	DNF
–	Laura Méndez Esquer	Spain	–	30 km	DNF
–	Birhane Dibaba	Ethiopia	–	25 km	DNF
–	Tejitu Daba	Bahrain	–	25 km	DNF
–	Kokob Tesfagabriel	Eritrea	–	Half	DNF
–	Viktoriia Kaliuzhna	Ukraine	–	Half	DNF
–	Irvette van Zyl	South Africa	–	Half	DNF
–	Sara Moreira	Portugal	–	Half	DNF
–	Aliphine Tuliamuk	United States	–	20 km	DNF
–	Aoife Cooke	Ireland	–	20 km	DNF
–	Darya Mykhaylova	Ukraine	–	20 km	DNF
–	Zeineba Yimer	Ethiopia	–	15 km	DNF
–	Eva Vrabcová-Nývltová	Czech Republic	–	10 km	DNF
–	Meryem Erdoğan	Turkey	–	5 km	DNF
