= Victoria Schenk =

Austrian long-distance runner

Personal information
- Born: 21 June 1988 (age 37)

Sport
- Country: Austria
- Sport: Long-distance running

Victoria Schenk (born 21 June 1988) is an Austrian long-distance runner. In 2020, she competed in the women's half marathon at the 2020 World Athletics Half Marathon Championships held in Gdynia, Poland.

== Achievements ==
| Year | Competition | Venue | Position | Event | Notes |
Representing Austria
| 2020 | World Championships (HM) | Gdynia, Poland | 86th | Half marathon | 1:16:36 |
