= Marta Galimany =

Spanish long-distance runner

Personal information
- Full name: Marta Galimany Guasch
- Born: 5 October 1985 (age 40) Valls, Spain
- Height: 169 cm (5 ft 7 in)
- Weight: 52 kg (115 lb)

Sport
- Country: Spain
- Sport: Track and field
- Event: Marathon
Medal record
European Championships
Bronze medal – third place	2018 Berlin	Marathon Team

Marta Galimany Guasch (Note: In this Spanish name, the first or paternal surname is Galimany and the second or maternal family name is Guasch.) (born 5 October 1985) is a Spanish long-distance runner who specialises in the marathon.

== Personal bests ==
Outdoor

- 10,000 metres – 33:11.41 (Torrevieja 2021)
- 10 km – 32:29 (Barcelona 2021)
- One hour (track) - 17.546m NR (Brussels 2020)
- Half marathon – 1:10:45 (Valencia 2023)
- Marathon – 2:26:14 (Valencia 2022)

== Achievements ==
Year	Competition	Venue	Position	Event	Notes
Representing Spain
2016	World Half Marathon Championships	Cardiff, United Kingdom	53rd	Half marathon	1:15:37
2018	Mediterranean Games	Tarragona, Spain	2nd	Half marathon	1:15:16
2018	European Championships	Berlin, Germany	24th	Marathon	2:38:25
2019	World Championships	Doha, Qatar	16th	Marathon	2:47:45
2020	World Half Marathon Championships	Gdynia, Poland	33rd	Half marathon	1:11:08
2021	European 10,000 m Cup	Birmingham, United Kingdom	24th	10,000 m	34:05.69
2021	Olympic Games	Sapporo, Japan	37th	Marathon	2:35:39
2022	Ibero-American Championships	Torrevieja, Spain	3rd	Half marathon	1:13:23
2022	European Championships	Munich, Germany	11th	Marathon	2:31:14
2023	World Championships	Budapest, Hungary	38th	Marathon	2:37:10

== 2018 World half marathon controversy ==
In 2018, both Carles Castillejo and Marta Galimany were selected by the Spanish National Athletics Federation to compete in the World Half Marathon Championships, among other five athletes per sex, being held in Valencia later that year. However, two days before the race, it was announced that a mistake took place by the federation while reading the rule book for that championships, and that the event only accepted 5 athletes per nation. Therefore, both Marta and Carles were ejected from the national team and could not compete in the event, what caused a massive controversy.
