= Tjejmilen =

Women's cross-country running competition in Sweden

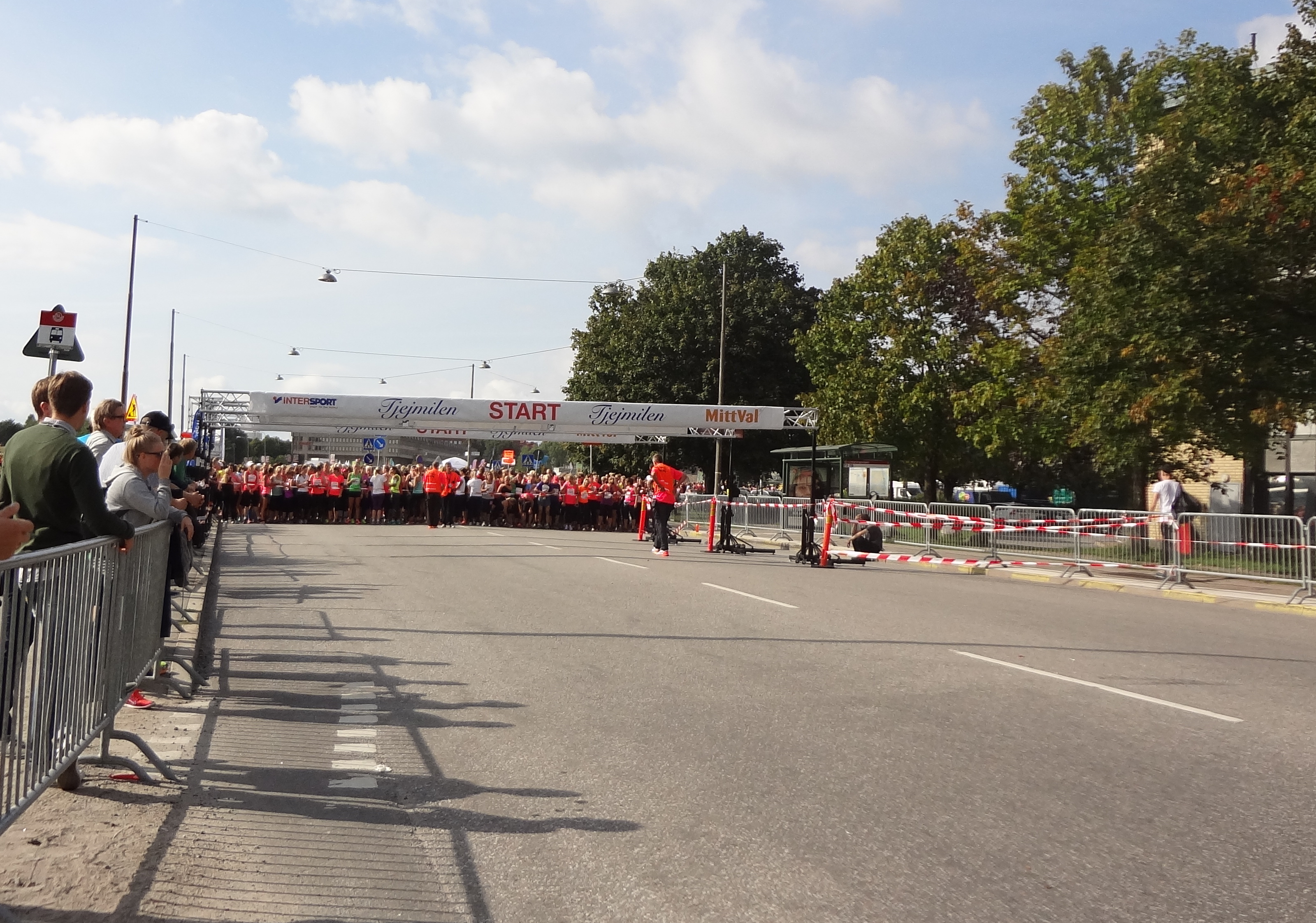
- The 2014 starting lineup
- Date: August–September
- Location: Stockholm, Sweden
- Event type: Cross-country running
- Distance: 1 Scandinavian mile
- Established: 1984

Tjejmilen is a girls-women only, cross-country running event in Stockholm, Sweden. Hosted by Hässelby SK and Spårvägens FK, it is run across a 10 kilometers long course on Djurgården.

Being annual, the first event was held on 19 August 1984. It often gathers thousands of participants.

== Winners ==
- 1984 – Evy Palm, Sweden, 34:21
- 1985 – Evy Palm, Sweden, 34:28
- 1986 – Evy Palm, Sweden, 33:29
- 1987 – Malin Wästlund, Sweden, 34:20
- 1988 – Evy Palm, Sweden, 34:09
- 1989 – Evy Palm, Sweden, 34:09
- 1990 – Grete Waitz, Norway, 33:49
- 1991 – Midde Hamrin, Sweden, 34:34
- 1992 – Sara Romé, Sweden, 35:14
- 1993 – Gunhild Halle, Norway, 34:25
- 1994 – Sara Romé, Sweden, 34:35
- 1995 – Grete Kirkeberg, Norway, 34:50
- 1996 – Ingmarie Nilsson, Sweden, 35,32
- 1997 – Grete Kirkeberg, Norway, 35:16
- 1998 – Marie Söderström-Lundberg, Sweden, 34:37
- 1999 – Susanne Johansson, Sweden, 36:04
- 2000 – Marie Söderström-Lundberg, Sweden, 33:29
- 2001 – Lena Gavelin, Sweden, 33:35
- 2002 – Janet Ongera, Kenya, 33:22
- 2003 – Kirsi Valasti, Finland, 33:16
- 2004 – Lena Gavelin, Sweden, 34:44
- 2005 – Lisa Blommé, Sweden, 34:45
- 2006 – Ida Nilsson, Sweden, 34:12
- 2007 – Isabellah Andersson, Sweden, 34:50
- 2008 – Lisa Blommé, Sweden, 33:58
- 2009 – Isabellah Andersson, Sweden, 33:49
- 2010 – Isabellah Andersson, Sweden, 33:38
- 2011 – Isabellah Andersson, Sweden, 33:25
- 2012 – Karoline Bjerkeli Grøvdal, Norway 33.14
- 2013 – Isabellah Andersson, Sweden, 33:42
- 2014 – Meraf Bahta, Sweden, 32:40
- 2015 – Webalem Ayele, Ethiopia, 33:28
- 2016 – Fantu Tekla, Ethiopia, 32:40
- 2017 – Sara Holmgren, Sweden 34.52
- 2018 – Ayantu Eshete, Ethiopia, 35:06
- 2019 – Hanna Lindholm, Sweden, 35:06
- 2020 – Cancelled because of the Corona pandemic
- 2021 – Meraf Bahta, Sweden, 32.41
- 2022 – Carolina Wikström, Sweden, 33.51
- 2023 – Sarah Lahti, Sweden, 35.32
- 2024 – Carolina Wikström , Sweden, 33:45
- 2025 – Hanna Lindholm, Sweden, 34:32
- 2026 – Tilda Månsson, Sweden, 33:43

== See also ==
- Tjejtrampet
- Tjejvasan
