= Athletics at the 2019 Pan American Games – Women's marathon =

Women's marathon at the 2019 Pan American Games
- Venue: Parque Kennedy
- Dates: July 27
- Competitors: 17 from 11 nations
- Winning time: 2:30:55 GR

Medalists
Gold medal	Gladys Tejeda	Peru
Silver medal	Bethany Sachtleben	United States
Bronze medal	Angie Orjuela	Colombia

The women's marathon competition of the athletics events at the 2019 Pan American Games took place on 27 July on a temporary circuit around the Parque Kennedy in Lima, Peru. The defending Pan American Games champion was Adriana Aparecida da Silva of Brazil. Gladys Tejeda from Peru won the gold medal.

== Records ==
World record	Paula Radcliffe (GBR)	2:15:35	London, Great Britain	April 14, 2003
Pan American Games record	Adriana Aparecida da Silva (BRA)	2:35:40	Toronto, Canada	July 18, 2015

== Schedule ==
Date	Time	Round
July 27, 2019	8:30	Final

== Abbreviations ==
- All times shown are in hours:minutes:seconds

KEY:	q	Fastest non-qualifiers	Q	Qualified	NR	National record	PB	Personal best	SB	Seasonal best	DQ	Disqualified

== Results ==
Rank	Athlete	Nation	Time	Notes
1st place, gold medalist(s)	Gladys Tejeda	Peru	2:30:55	GR
2nd place, silver medalist(s)	Bethany Sachtleben	United States	2:31:20	PB
3rd place, bronze medalist(s)	Angie Orjuela	Colombia	2:32:27	PB
4	Rosa Chacha	Ecuador	2:32:45	PB
5	Samantha Roecker	United States	2:32:49	PB
6	Valdilene dos Santos Silva	Brazil	2:34:20	
7	Margarita Hérnandez	Mexico	2:35:06	
8	Andreia Hessel	Brazil	2:35:40	
9	Andrea Bonilla	Ecuador	2:40:38	PB
10	Dailín Belmonte	Cuba	2:45:08	
11	Verónica Angel	Chile	2:46:04	PB
12	Gabriela Traña	Costa Rica	2:49:28	
13	Maria Lujan Urrutia	Argentina	2:50:09	
14	Francy Mendez	Costa Rica	2:56:31	
15	Arelys Rodriguez	Venezuela	2:56:39	
16	Yudileyvis Castillo	Cuba	3:03:41	
	Giselle Alvarez	Chile	DNF	

Report:
