= Elisa Stefani =

Italian long-distance runner

Personal information
- Born: 4 May 1986 (age 39)

Sport
- Country: Italy
- Sport: Long-distance running

Elisa Stefani (born 4 May 1986) is an Italian long-distance runner. In 2020, she competed in the women's half marathon at the 2020 World Athletics Half Marathon Championships held in Gdynia, Poland.
