= Marcela Cristina Gómez =

Argentine long-distance runner

Personal information
- Born: 19 February 1984 (age 41) Tres Isletas, Argentina

Sport
- Country: Argentina
- Sport: Long-distance running

Marcela Cristina Gómez (born 19 February 1984) is an Argentine long-distance runner. She competed in the women's marathon at the 2020 Summer Olympics held in Tokyo, Japan. In 2020, she competed in the women's half marathon at the World Athletics Half Marathon Championships held in Gdynia, Poland.
