= Dorcas Jepchumba Kimeli =

Kenyan long-distance runner

Personal information
- Born: 5 July 1997 (age 28)

Sport
- Country: Kenya
- Sport: Long-distance running

Dorcas Jepchumba Kimeli (born 5 July 1997) is a Kenyan long-distance runner. She competed in the women's half marathon at the 2020 World Athletics Half Marathon Championships held in Gdynia, Poland.
