= Molly Seidel =

American long-distance runner

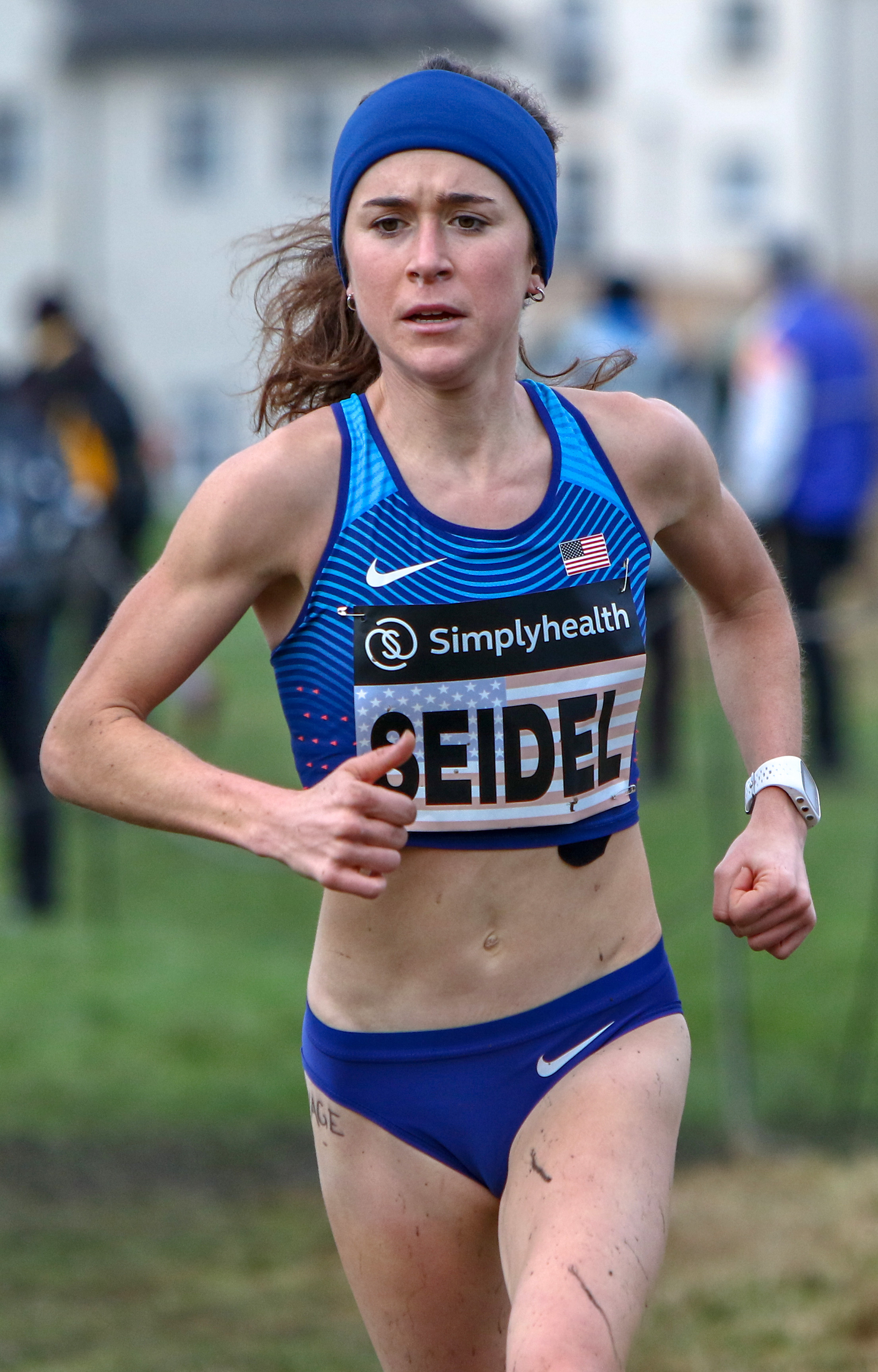
- Seidel in 2018

Personal information
- Born: Molly Elizabeth Seidel; July 12, 1994 (age 32) Brookfield, Wisconsin
- Height: 5 ft 5 in (1.65 m)

Sport
- Country: United States
- Sport: Track, long-distance running
- Events: 5000 m, 10,000 m, Half marathon, Marathon
- College team: Notre Dame Fighting Irish
- Club: Puma
- Turned pro: 2017
- Coached by: Tim Broe 2017–19; Jon Green 2019–present

Achievements and titles
- Olympic finals: 2020 Tokyo; Marathon, Bronze
- Personal bests: 3000 m: 8:57.13 i OT (South Bend 2016); 5000 m: 15:15.21 i (Birmingham 2016); 10,000 m: 32:02.19 (Portland 2021); 5 km: 15:33 (Boston 2018); 10 km: 32:13 (New York 2021); Half marathon: 1:08:29 (EchoPark Automotive Speedway 2021); Marathon: 2:23:07 (Chicago 2023)
Medal record
Women's athletics
Representing United States
Olympic Games
Bronze medal – third place	2020 Tokyo	Marathon
Representing Notre Dame Fighting Irish
NCAA Cross Country Championships
Gold medal – first place	2015 Louisville	Cross Country
NCAA Outdoor Championships
Gold medal – first place	2015 Eugene	10,000m {{MedalCompetitionNCAA Indoor Championships }}
Gold medal – first place	2016 Birmingham	3000m
Gold medal – first place	2016 Birmingham	5000m

Molly Seidel (born July 12, 1994) is an American long distance runner. Seidel represented the United States at the Great Edinburgh Cross Country in 2012, 2013, and 2018. In her first-ever marathon, Seidel placed second at the 2020 U.S. Marathon Olympic Trials. Later, she went on to win the bronze medal in her third career marathon at the 2020 Summer Olympics in Tokyo. At the University of Notre Dame, Seidel was a 4-time NCAA champion, 6-time NCAA All-American, 6-time Atlantic Coast Conference champion and 2016 female ACC Athlete of the Year.

== Early life and education ==
Seidel grew up in Hartland, Wisconsin, and attended University Lake School. Molly won Gatorade National Female Cross Country Runner of the Year. She also was named Gatorade Wisconsin Female Cross Country Runner of the Year in 2011. Seidel won the 2011 national Foot Locker Cross Country Championships, breaking the tape in 17:22. Seidel won Wisconsin Interscholastic Athletic Association cross country, 1600m, and 3200m titles at the state meet all four years totaling 12 titles. Seidel earned New Balance Indoor Nationals mile and two-mile All-American honors in 2011. Seidel was invited to the Bupa Great Edinburgh International Challenge in Scotland where she placed third (15:16) in the 4K and was the first USA high school finisher.

== NCAA ==
Seidel attended the University of Notre Dame and was the 2015 NCAA Division 1 national cross-country champion and the 2016 NCAA Division I national indoor track and field 3000 meters and 5000 meters champion. Seidel won the 10,000 meters title at 2015 NCAA Division I Outdoor Track and Field Championships. Seidel was a six time Atlantic Coast Conference champion. She won the Honda Sports Award as the nation's top female cross country runner in 2016.

Year	Conference Cross Country	NCAA Cross Country	ACC indoor	NCAA indoor	ACC Outdoor	NCAA Outdoor
2015–16	19:36.2 1st	19:28.5 1st	3000 m 9:02.24 1st	3000 m 8:57.86 1st		
2015–16			5000 m 15:19.64 1st	5000 m 15:15.21 1st		
2014–15	20:11.2 5th	20:23.4 19th			10,000 m 33:39.70 2nd	10,000 m 33:18.37 1st
2014–15			3000 m 9:10.63 1st	DMR 11:15.96 8th		
2014–15			5000 m 15:55.84 1st	5000 m 15:48.31 6th	5000 m 16:07.87 1st	
2013–14	21:23.1 26th	21:48.8 171st	5000 m 16:31.27 8th		5000 m 16:40.62 11th	
2012–13	21:45.3 22nd	21:39.1 217th				

NOTE: Notre Dame was in the Big East in 2012–13 but moved to the Atlantic Coast Conference starting in 2013–14.

== Professional ==
Seidel was invited to the 2012 Bupa Great Edinburgh International Cross Country in Scotland where she placed third (15:16) in the 4 km and was the first USA high school finisher.

Seidel placed fourteenth in 20:13 in 2016 USATF National Club Cross Country Championships. She ran the 2017 USATF Road 5k Championships Abbott Dash to the Finishline 5k in 15:35, her professional debut road race representing Saucony.

Seidel qualified to represent Team USA at the 2018 Great Edinburgh International Cross Country in Scotland. Seidel finished third in the 6 km event in a time of 21:04, helping Team USA to an overall bronze.

Seidel continued the 2018 season with a 2nd place at the 2018 USA Cross Country Championships. She qualified for Team USA at 2018 NACAC Cross Country Championships in La Libertad, El Salvador on February 17, 2018.

In Atlanta, Georgia, at the U.S. Woman's Olympic Trials Marathon on February 29, 2020, Seidel broke from the pack along with Aliphine Tuliamuk. Over the rolling hills of the course, the two pushed each other and took a large lead over third place Sally Kipyego. Seidel finished eight seconds behind Tuliamuk for a second place in 2:27:31. She earned a spot on the US Olympic Team and won $65,000.

On October 4, 2020, Seidel ran the London Marathon and finished 6th overall. She was the second American woman, finishing with a personal best time of 2:25:13.

With the Olympic postponement, Seidel broke her personal mark in the half marathon at Hampton, Georgia, running a 1:08:28 on February 28, 2021, in the Publix Atlanta Half Marathon held on the premises of the EchoPark Automotive Speedway, as the event was moved to Henry County because of Fulton County restrictions.

On August 6, 2021, Seidel won the bronze medal in the Tokyo 2020 marathon and was the first American woman to medal in the event since Deena Kastor's bronze in 2004.

Seidel finished fourth at the 2021 New York City Marathon with a time of 2:24:42, which was the fastest ever by an American woman. She won $50,000 in prize money--$25,000 for her fourth-place finish and $25,000 for finishing as the top American.

In 2021, Molly Seidel participated in the Berbee Derby held in Fitchburg, Wisconsin and set the record for the fastest run for an individual dressed as a turkey.

On April 18, 2022, Seidel competed in the 2022 Boston Marathon. She was in the lead pack for the first half of the race but ended up withdrawing after 16 miles due to a hip impingement.

On October 8, 2023, Seidel competed in the 2023 Chicago Marathon. In her first marathon start in eighteen months, Seidel finished in eighth place, the second American, in a personal best time of 2:23:07.

On February 1, 2024, Seidel announced via her Instagram that she would not be racing in the 2024 U.S. Olympic Team Trials – Marathon due to a broken patella and partially torn patella tendon.

On November 2, 2025, Seidel started but did not finish the New York City Marathon.

On February 14, 2026, Seidel made her 100 km trail-racing debut at the Black Canyon 100K in Arizona, finishing fourth in 8:25:13 and earning a Golden Ticket entry to the 2026 Western States Endurance Run.

== Competition record ==
=== Marathons ===
Competition	Rank	Time	Location	Date	Notes
2020 US Olympic Team Trials	2nd	2:27:31	Atlanta, Georgia, USA	2020 Feb 29	Qualified for 2020 Tokyo Olympics
2020 London Marathon	6th	2:25:13	London, United Kingdom	2020 Oct 04	
2020 Summer Olympics	3rd	2:27:46	Tokyo, Japan	2021 Aug 07	1st US medal since 2004
2021 New York City Marathon	4th	2:24:42	New York City, USA	2021 Nov 07	Course record for an American woman
2022 Boston Marathon	DNF	N/A	Boston, USA	2022 April 18	Dropped out around 16 miles (26 km) due to a hip injury
2023 Chicago Marathon	8th	2:23:07	Chicago, USA	2023 October 8	New personal best

=== International results ===
Year	Competition	Venue	Position	Event	Notes
Representing the United States
2021	Tokyo Olympics	Sapporo, Japan	3rd place	Marathon	2:27:46
2018	Great Edinburgh International Cross Country	Edinburgh, Scotland	3rd place	6 km	21:04
2018	Great Edinburgh International Cross Country	Edinburgh, Scotland	Team USA 3rd place	6 km	81 points
2013	Great Edinburgh International Cross Country Junior Women	Edinburgh, Scotland	12th place	4 km	14:35
2013	Great Edinburgh International Cross Country Junior Women	Edinburgh, Scotland	Team USA 3rd	4 km	26 points
2012	Great Edinburgh International Cross Country Junior Women	Edinburgh, Scotland	3rd place	4 km	15:16
2012	Great Edinburgh International Cross Country Junior Women	Edinburgh, Scotland	Team USA 1st	4 km	16 points

== Personal life ==
Seidel has spoken publicly about her experiences with bulimia, OCD, and ADHD.
