= Martina Merlo =

Italian middle-distance runner

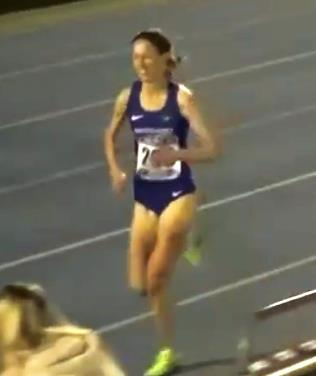
- Martina Merlo in 2015.

Personal information
- National team: Italy (3 caps)
- Born: 19 February 1993 (age 33) Turin, Italy
- Height: 1.65 m (5 ft 5 in)
- Weight: 45 kg (99 lb)

Sport
- Sport: Athletics
- Event(s): Middle-distance running Long-distance running
- Club: C.S. Aeronautica Militare
- Coached by: Liberato Pellecchia

Achievements and titles
- Personal bests: 3000 m st: 9:37.72 (2021); 3000 m indoor: 9:13.20 (2021)
Medal record
European 10,000m Cup
Silver medal – second place	2021 Birmingham	10,000 m team

Martina Merlo (born 19 February 1993) is an Italian middle-distance runner and steeplechase runner.

== Achievements ==
Year	Competition	Venue	Position	Event	Time	Notes
2018	European Championships	(Germany) Berlin	16th (NQ )	3000 m steeplechase	9:41.05	PB

== National titles ==
Merlo won four national championships.

- Italian Athletics Championships
  - 3000 metres steeplechase: 2020, 2021 (2)
  - 10,000 metres: 2021
- Italian Cross Country Championships
  - Long race: 2018

== See also ==
- Italian all-time top lists – 3000 m steeplechase
- Italian team at the running events
