= Simon Holbek Kønigsfeldt =

Danish long-distance runner

Personal information
- Born: 10 March 1986 (age 39)

Sport
- Country: Denmark
- Sport: Athletics
- Event: Long-distance running

Simon Holbek Kønigsfeldt (born 10 March 1986) is a Danish long-distance runner. In 2020, he competed in the men's race at the 2020 World Athletics Half Marathon Championships held in Gdynia, Poland.
