= Angie Orjuela =

Colombian long-distance runner

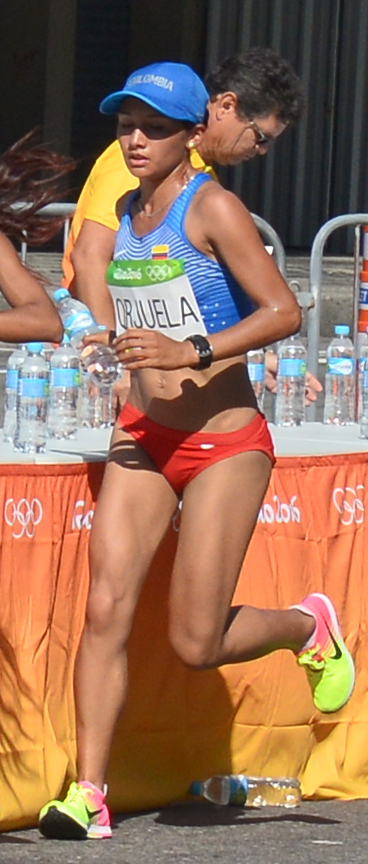
- Angie Orjuela at the 2016 Summer Olympics

Personal information
- Full name: Angie Rocio Orjuela Soche
- Nationality: Colombian
- Born: 9 May 1989 (age 37) Bogotá, Colombia
- Height: 1.78 m (5 ft 10 in)
- Weight: 70 kg (154 lb)

Sport
- Country: Colombia
- Sport: Athletics
- Events: 5000 metres; 10,000 metres; 10 km (road); 15 km (road); Half marathon; Marathon
Medal record
Representing Colombia
Women's athletics
Event	1st	2nd	3rd
Pan American Games	0	0	1
CAC Games	0	0	2
Bolivarian Games	0	1	0
Total	0	1	3
Pan American Games
Bronze medal – third place	2019 Lima	Marathon
Central American and Caribbean Games
Bronze medal – third place	2018 Barranquilla	Marathon
Bronze medal – third place	2023 San Salvador	Half marathon
Bolivarian Games
Silver medal – second place	2017 Santa Marta	Half marathon

Angie Rocio Orjuela Soche (born 9 May 1989) is a Colombian long-distance runner who specialises in the marathon. She represented Colombia in the marathons of the 2016, 2020, and 2024 Olympic games and won a bronze medal at the 2019 Pan American Games in the women's marathon event. In 2020, she competed in the women's half marathon at the 2020 World Athletics Half Marathon Championships held in Gdynia, Poland.

== Personal bests ==
- 5,000 m – 16:45.67 (Berkeley 2012), Brutus Hamilton Invitational
- 10,000 m – 33:27.22 (Torrance 2019), Mt. SAC Relays
- 10 km (road) – 34:16 (Girardot 2016)
- 15 km (road) – 53:15 (Bogotá 2015)
- Half marathon – 1:11:48 (Houston 2024), Houston Half Marathon
- Marathon – 2:25:35 NR (Berlin 2023), Berlin Marathon
