= Bethany Sachtleben =

American long-distance runner (born 1992)

Personal information
- Born: February 9, 1992 (age 34)

Sport
- Country: United States
- Sport: Long-distance running
Medal record
Women's athletics
Representing United States
Pan American Games
Silver medal – second place	2019 Lima	Marathon

Bethany Sachtleben (born February 9, 1992) is an American long-distance runner. In 2019, she won the silver medal in the women's marathon at the 2019 Pan American Games held in Lima, Peru.

In 2019, she competed at the 2019 USA Cross Country Championships held in Tallahassee, Florida without winning a medal.
