= Ahn Seul-ki =

South Korean long-distance runner

Personal information
- Nationality: South Korean
- Born: 29 May 1992 (age 34)
- Height: 1.61 m (5 ft 3 in)
- Weight: 46 kg (101 lb)

Sport
- Sport: Women's athletics
- Event: Marathon

Achievements and titles
- Personal best: Marathon: 2:32:15 (2016)

Korean name
- Hangul: 안슬기
- RR: An Seulgi
- MR: An Sŭlgi
- IPA: [an.sɯl.ɡi]

Ahn Seul-ki (Korean: 안슬기; born 29 May 1992) is a South Korean long-distance runner who competes in the marathon. She represented her country at the 2016 Summer Olympics. Her personal best for the distance is 2:32:15 hours.

Ahn made her first impact at national level at the 2009 Korean National Sports Festival, taking third in the 10K run. Her debut over the marathon came four years later. At age twenty she finished the Daegu Marathon in tenth place with a time of 2:48:57 hours. Later that year she was runner-up in the event at the Korean National Sports Festival. In the 2014 season she set a half marathon best of 77:13 minutes to finish runner-up in Incheon. She ran two marathons within the space of a week in November, placing sixth at the National Games then winning her first major race, with 2:37:47 hours to top the podium at the JoongAng Seoul Marathon.

A best of 2:36:14 hours came at the 2015 Seoul International Marathon, though she was eleventh overall in the higher calibre field. She closed the year with wins at the Incheon Half Marathon (setting a new best of 74:15 minutes) and won the National Games Marathon title. March 2016 saw Ahn set new bests in the half marathon (73:41 minutes) and the marathon (2:32:15). These performances earned her selection for South Korea at the 2016 Summer Olympics. She finished 42nd at the 2016 Olympic marathon, ahead of teammate Lim Kyung-hee, but some way behind her Northern rivals Kim Hye-song and Kim Hye-gyong.

== Personal bests ==
- 1500 metres – 4:47.49 min (2013)
- 5000 metres – 16:33.39 min (2016)
- 10,000 metres – 33:23.43 min (2016)
- 3000 metres steeplechase – 10:26.74 min (2009)
- 10K run – 33:59 min (2009)
- Half Marathon – 73:41 min (2016)
- Marathon – 2:32:15 (2016)

All information from All-Athletics profile.

== International competitions ==
Year	Competition	Venue	Position	Event	Notes
2016	Olympic Games	Rio de Janeiro, Brazil	42nd	Marathon	2:36:50
2021	Olympic Games	Sapporo, Japan	57th	Marathon	2:41:11
