= Andrea Bonilla (runner) =

Ecuadorian long-distance runner (born 1986)

Personal information
- Born: 5 December 1986 (age 39)

Sport
- Country: Ecuador
- Sport: Long-distance running

Andrea Paola Bonilla (born 5 December 1986) is an Ecuadorian long-distance runner. In 2021, she represented Ecuador at the 2020 Summer Olympics in Tokyo, Japan. She competed in the women's marathon.

In 2019, she competed in the women's marathon at the Pan American Games held in Lima, Peru. In 2020, she competed in the women's half marathon at the 2020 World Athletics Half Marathon Championships held in Gdynia, Poland.

She competed in the women's marathon at the 2022 World Athletics Championships held in Eugene, Oregon, United States. She set a new national record in the women's 5000 meters with a time of 15:37.55 at the Stanford Invitational on April 4, 2025.
