= Federica Sugamiele =

Italian long-distance runner

Personal information
- National team: Italy: 2 caps (2020–2021)
- Born: 27 April 1996 (age 30) Erice, Trapani, Italy
- Height: 1.60 m (5 ft 3 in)
- Weight: 45 kg (99 lb)

Sport
- Sport: Sport of athletics
- Event: Long-distance running
- Club: Caivano Runners
- Coached by: Gaspare Polizzi

Achievements and titles
- Personal bests: 10,000: 34:08.12 (2021); Half marathon: 1:13:04 (2020)
Medal record
European 10,000m Cup
Silver medal – second place	2021 Birmingham	10,000 m team

Federica Sugamiele (born 27 April 1996) is an Italian long-distance runner. In 2020, she competed in the women's half marathon at the 2020 World Athletics Half Marathon Championships held in Gdynia, Poland.

== See also ==
- Italian team at the running events
