= Samira Mezeghrane =

French long-distance runner

Personal information
- Born: 29 December 1979 (age 45) France

Sport
- Country: France
- Sport: Long-distance running

Samira Mezeghrane (born 29 December 1979) is a French long-distance runner. In 2020, she competed in the women's half marathon at the World Athletics Half Marathon Championships held in Gdynia, Poland.
