= Damian Kabat =

Polish long-distance runner

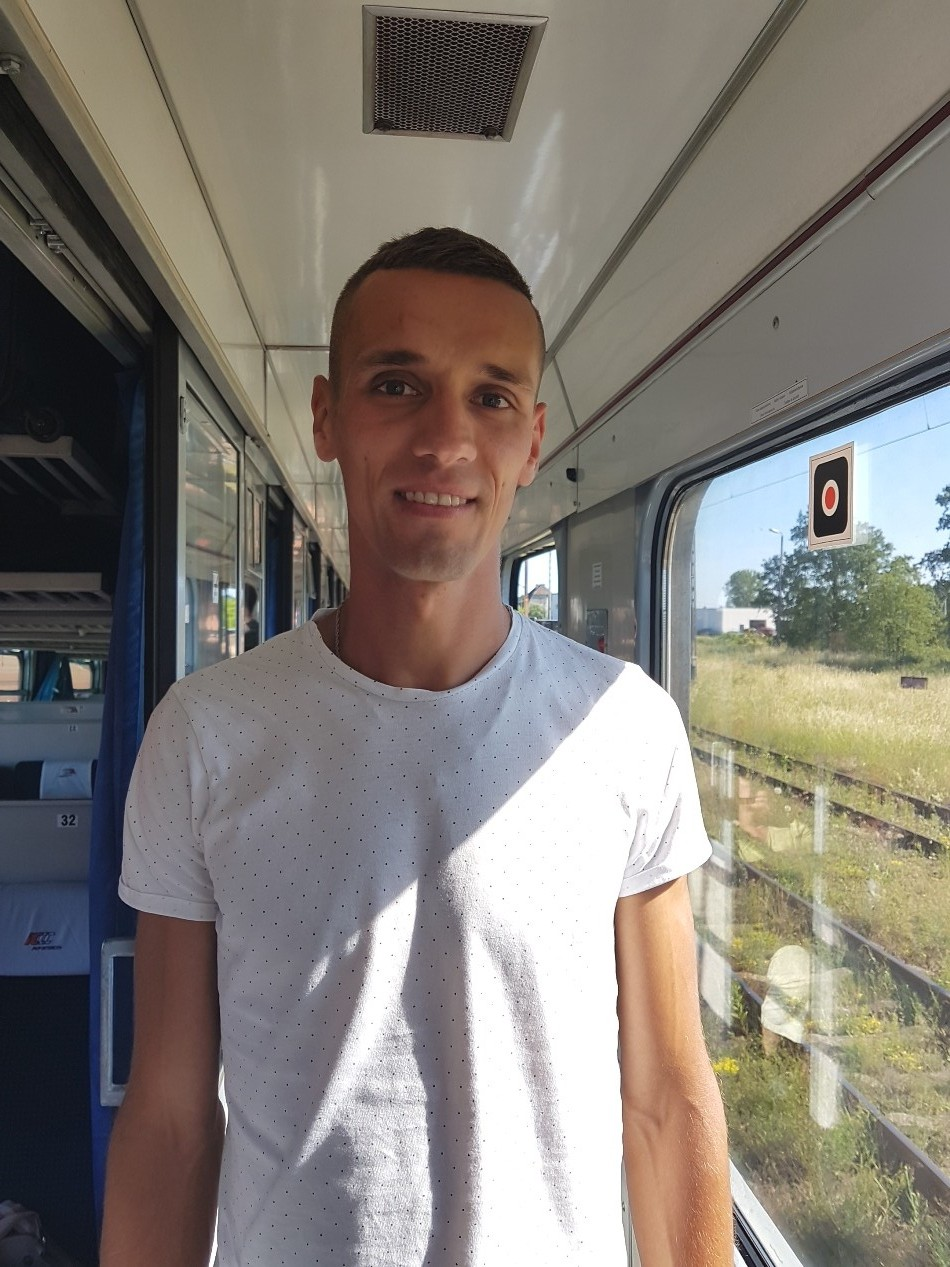
- Damian Kabat in 2018

Personal information
- Born: 20 October 1989 (age 35)

Sport
- Country: Poland
- Sport: Athletics
- Event: Long-distance running

Damian Kabat (born 20 October 1989) is a Polish long-distance runner. In 2020, he competed in the men's race at the 2020 World Athletics Half Marathon Championships held in Gdynia, Poland.
