= Elena Loyo =

Spanish long-distance runner (born 1983)

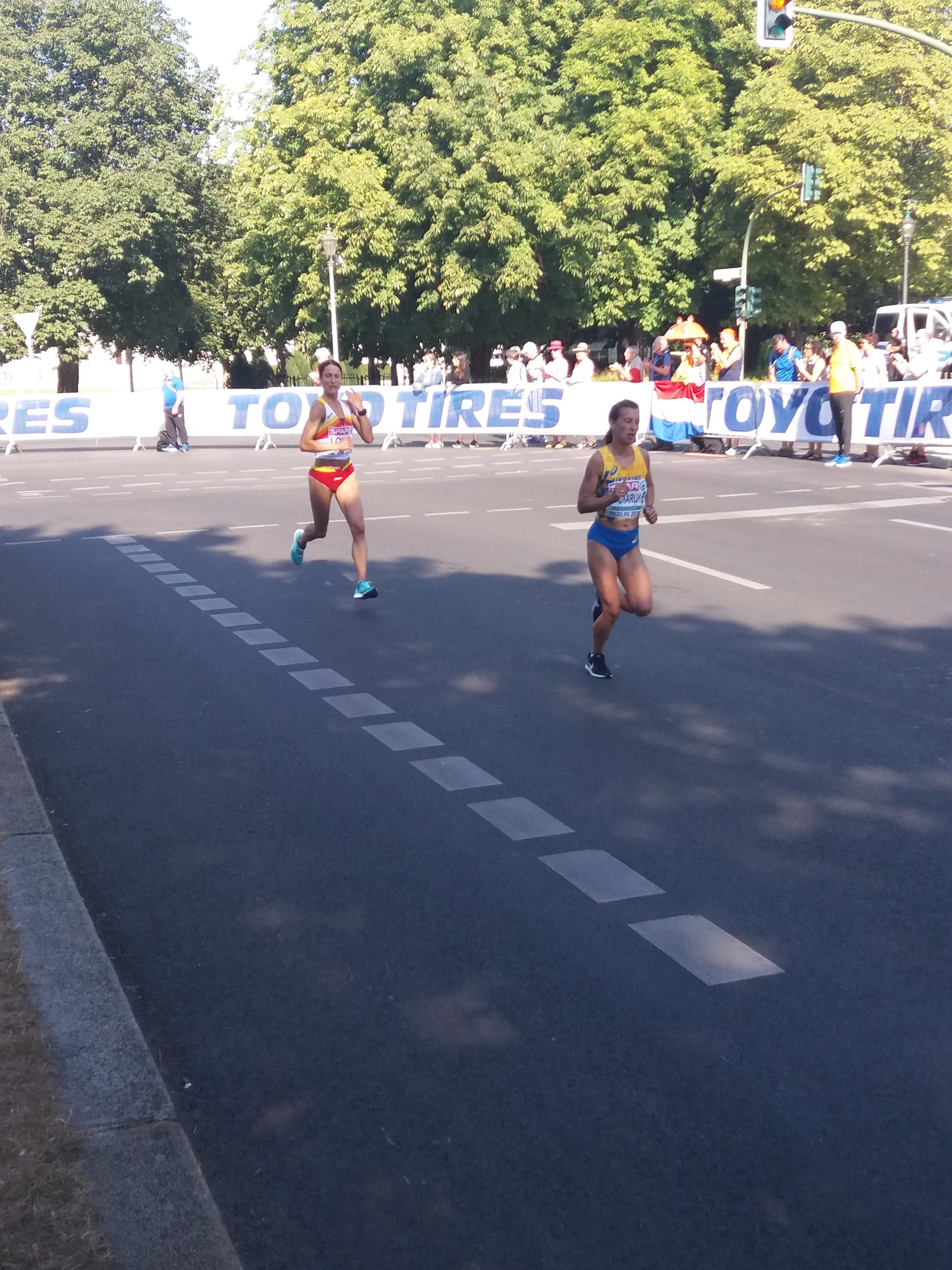
- 2018 European Championships (25)

Personal information
- Full name: Elena Loyo Menoyo
- Nationality: Spanish
- Born: 11 January 1983 (age 43) Vitoria, Spain
- Height: 169 cm (5 ft 7 in)
- Weight: 53 kg (117 lb)

Sport
- Country: Spain
- Sport: Long-distance running
- Event: Marathon
- Club: Bilbao Atletismo
Medal record
European Championships
Bronze medal – third place	2018 Berlin	Marathon Team

Elena Loyo Menoyo (Note: In this Spanish name, the first or paternal surname is Loyo and the second or maternal family name is Menoyo.) (born 11 January 1983) is a Spanish long-distance runner.

== Achievements ==
Year	Competition	Venue	Position	Event	Notes
Representing Spain
2018	World Half Marathon Championships	Valencia, Spain	55th	Half Marathon	1:14:19
2018	Mediterranean Games	Tarragona, Spain	3rd	Half Marathon	1:16:20
2018	European Championships	Berlin, Germany	23rd	Marathon	2:37:54
2020	World Half Marathon Championships	Gdynia, Poland	56th	Half marathon	1:12:44
2021	Olympic Games	Sapporo, Japan	29th	Marathon	2:34:38
2022	European Championships	Munich, Germany	18th	Marathon	2:34:56

== Beauty pageant ==
Elena was crowned Miss Álava in 2005 and went on to compete at Miss Spain 2006, without getting the title.
