= Bai Li =

Chinese long-distance runner

Personal information
- Nationality: Chinese
- Born: 30 March 1996 (age 29)

Sport
- Sport: Athletics
- Event: Long-distance running

Bai Li (Chinese: 白丽; born 30 March 1996) is a Chinese long-distance runner. She qualified to represent China at the 2020 Summer Olympics in Tokyo 2021, competing in women's marathon.
