= Timon Theuer =

Austrian long-distance runner

Personal information
- Born: 5 March 1994 (age 31)

Sport
- Country: Austria
- Sport: Athletics
- Event: Long-distance running

Timon Theuer (born 5 March 1994) is an Austrian long-distance runner. In 2020, he competed in the men's race at the 2020 World Athletics Half Marathon Championships held in Gdynia, Poland.
