= Jean Marie Vianney Niyomukiza =

Burundian long-distance runner

Personal information
- Born: 2 January 1998 (age 27)

Sport
- Country: Burundi
- Sport: Athletics
- Event: Long-distance running

Jean Marie Vianney Niyomukiza (born 2 January 1998) is a Burundian long-distance runner. In 2020, he competed in the men's race at the 2020 World Athletics Half Marathon Championships held in Gdynia, Poland.
