= Joelle Cortis =

Maltese long-distance runner

Personal information
- Born: 28 March 1987 (age 38)

Sport
- Country: Malta
- Sport: Long-distance running

Joelle Cortis (born 28 March 1987) is a Maltese long-distance runner. In 2020, she competed in the women's half marathon at the 2020 World Athletics Half Marathon Championships held in Gdynia, Poland. She also competed in the inaugural World Athletics Road Running Championships 2023 held in Riga, Latvia where she achieved the fastest Maltese time in the Women's Half Marathon.
