= Karen Ehrenreich =

Danish long-distance runner

Personal information
- Born: 24 September 1984 (age 41)

Sport
- Country: Denmark
- Sport: Long-distance running
- Coached by: Simon Bregendal Bak

Achievements and titles
- National finals: Dansk mester Marathon 2022 Dansk mester 10.000 m 2022
- Personal best(s): 2.34,15 Marathon Sevilla 2023 and 1.13.32 Valencia half 2022

Karen Ehrenreich (born 24 September 1984) is a Danish long-distance runner. In 2020, she competed in the women's half marathon at the 2020 World Athletics Half Marathon Championships held in Gdynia, Poland.
