= Giovanna Epis =

Italian long-distance runner

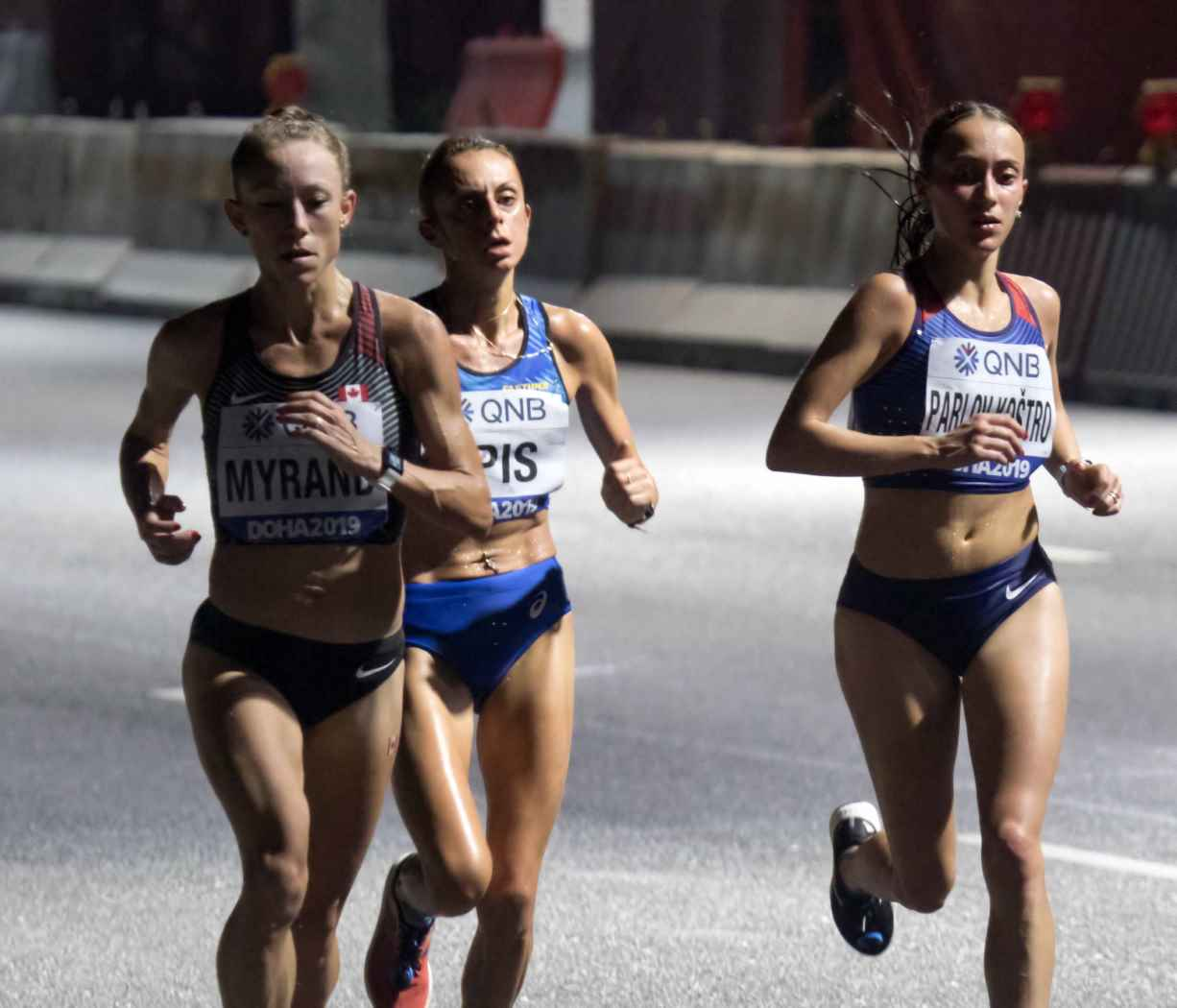
- Epis (in center, with the surname on her bib).

Personal information
- National team: Italy (7 caps)
- Born: 11 October 1988 (age 37) Venice, Italy
- Height: 1.64 m (5 ft 5 in)
- Weight: 46 kg (101 lb)

Sport
- Country: Italy
- Sport: Athletics
- Event: Long-distance running
- Club: G.S. Forestale; C.S. Carabinieri
- Coached by: Giorgio Rondelli

Achievements and titles
- Personal bests: 5000 m: 16:07.18 (2019); 10,000: 32:59.16 (2019); Half marathon: 1:12:27 (2018); Marathon: 2:25:20 (2021)
Medal record
Women's athletics
Representing Italy
European Athletics Championships
Silver medal – second place	2026 Birmingham	Marathon team
Mediterranean Games
Gold medal – first place	2022 Oran	Half marathon
European 10,000m Cup
Silver medal – second place	2021 Birmingham	10,000 m team
Bronze medal – third place	2019 London	10,000 m team

Giovanna Epis (born 11 October 1988) is an Italian long-distance runner.

== Biography ==
She competed at the 2018 IAAF World Half Marathon Championships. She was bronze medal with the Italian team at the 2019 European 10,000m Cup in London. In 2019, she competed in the women's marathon at the 2019 World Athletics Championships held in Doha, Qatar. She did not finish her race. She competed at the 2020 Summer Olympics, in Marathon.

On 7 April 2019, setting her personal best in the Rotterdam Marathon with a time of 2:29:11, she achieved the entry standard for the Tokyo 2020 Olympics, which was set at 2:29:30.

== Progression ==
Marathon

The Epis in 2015 disputed her first marathon, managing to improve subsequently six times in succession.

Year	Date	Position	Time	Venue	Marathon	Note
2020	13/12	1st	2:28:03	(Italy) Reggio nell'Emilia	National Championships	PB
2019	07/04	6th	2:29:11	(Netherlands) Rotterdam	Rotterdam Marathon	
2018	25/02	6th	2:29:41	(Spain) Sivilla	Seville Marathon	
2017	15/10	9th	2:32:31	(Netherlands) Amsterdam	Amsterdam Marathon	
2017	02/04	6th	2:34:13	(Italy) Milan	Milano City Marathon	
2016	30/10	11th	2:35:37	(Germany) Frankfurt	Mainova Frankfurt Marathon	
2016	10/04	4th	2:38:20	(Italy) Rome	Rome Marathon	
2015	29/11	5th	2:39:28	(Italy) Florence	Florence Marathon	

== Achievements ==
Year	Competition	Venue	Position	Event	Time	Notes
2009	European U23 Championships	(Lithuania) Kaunas	17th	10,000 m	36:45.18	
2011	Universiade	(China) Shenzhen	7th	10,000 m	35:46.28	
2018	Half Marathon Championships	(Spain) Valencia	40th	Half marathon	1:12:27	PB
2018	European 10,000m Cup	(United Kingdom) London	27th	10,000 m	33:14.71	PB
2018	European 10,000m Cup	(United Kingdom) London	7th	10,000 m team	1:42:43.18	
2019	European 10,000m Cup	(United Kingdom) London	25th	10,000 m	32:59.16	PB
2019	European 10,000m Cup	(United Kingdom) London	3rd	10,000 m team	1:38:13.80	
2021	European 10,000m Cup	(United Kingdom) Birmingham	15th	10,000 m	33:02.23	
2021	European 10,000m Cup	(United Kingdom) Birmingham	2nd	10,000 m team	1:39:32.49	
2022	Mediterranean Games	(Algeria) Oran	1st	Half marathon	1:13:47	
2022	European Championships	(Germany) Munich	5th	Marathon	2:29:06	SB

== National titles ==
Epis won two national championships at individual senior level.

- Italian Athletics Championships
  - Marathon: 2020
  - Half marathon: 2021

== See also ==
- Italian team at the running events
- Italy at the 2018 European Athletics Championships
- Italy at the 2019 World Championships in Athletics
