= Daniela Torres Huerta =

Mexican long-distance runner

Personal information
- Nationality: Mexican
- Born: 23 July 1994 (age 31)

Sport
- Sport: Athletics
- Event: Long-distance running

Daniela Torres Huerta (born 23 July 1994) is a Mexican long-distance runner. She qualified to represent Mexico at the 2020 Summer Olympics in Tokyo 2021, competing in women's marathon.
