= Úrsula Sánchez =

Mexican long-distance runner

Personal information
- Born: 15 September 1987 (age 38) Guadalajara, Mexico

Sport
- Sport: Athletics
- Event: Long-distance running
Medal record
Women's athletics
Representing Mexico
Central American and Caribbean Games
Gold medal – first place	2018 Barranquilla	10,000 m

Úrsula Patricia Sánchez (born 15 September 1987) is a Mexican long-distance runner. She qualified to represent Mexico at the 2020 Summer Olympics in Tokyo 2021, competing in women's marathon.
