= Carolina Wikström =

Swedish long-distance runner

Personal information
- Born: 4 September 1993 (age 32)

Sport
- Country: Sweden
- Sport: Long-distance running

Carolina Wikström (born 4 September 1993) is a Swedish long-distance runner. She competed in the women's marathon at the 2020 Summer Olympics held in Tokyo, Japan.

In 2020, she competed in the women's half marathon at the World Athletics Half Marathon Championships held in Gdynia, Poland.

She also competed in the women's marathon at the 2022 World Athletics Championships held in Eugene, Oregon, United States.

She won the 2022 edition of the Tjejmilen competition.
