= Juan Antonio Pérez =

Spanish long-distance runner

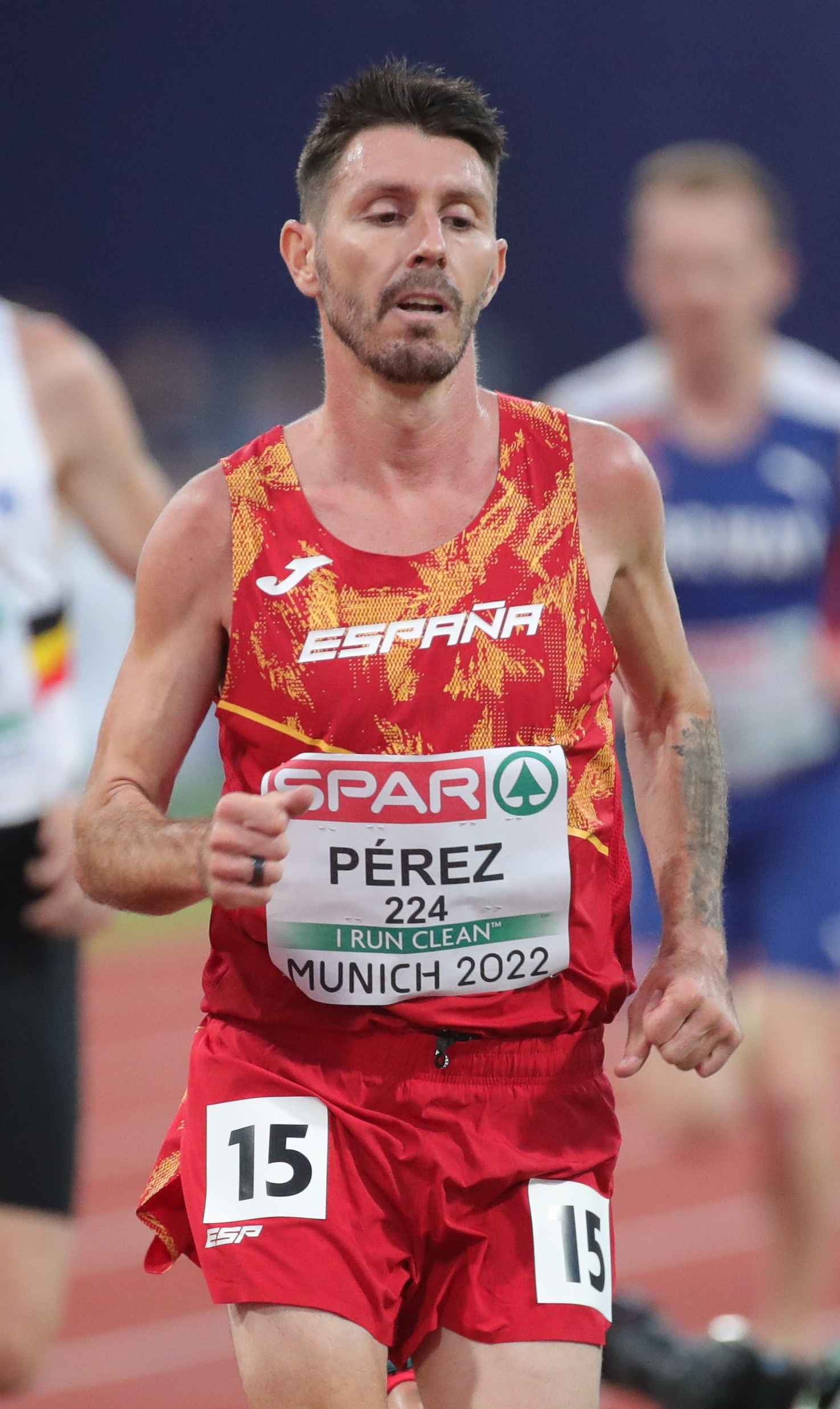
- Pérez in 2022

Personal information
- Nickname: Chiki Pérez
- Citizenship: Ciudad Real
- Born: Juan Antonio Pérez Moreno; 6 November 1988 (age 37)

Sport
- Country: Spain
- Sport: Athletics
- Event: Long-distance running

Juan Antonio Pérez (born 6 November 1988) is a Spanish long-distance runner. In 2020, he competed in the men's race at the 2020 World Athletics Half Marathon Championships held in Gdynia, Poland.

In 2018, he competed in the men's half marathon at the 2018 IAAF World Half Marathon Championships held in Valencia, Spain. In 2019, he competed in the senior men's race at the 2019 IAAF World Cross Country Championships held in Aarhus, Denmark.

In 2015, 2016 and 2017 he was runner-up in the European Cup of 10,000 m.l for three consecutive years.

In 2016 he was sixth in the European 10,000 m.l Championships held in Amsterdam..

In 2018 he participated in the European Championships held in Berlin in the 10,000 m.l event, finishing in ninth place and then in the 5,000 m.l, remaining in 16th place. Also in 2018 he participated in the South American Championship in the 5000m.l test held in Trujillo (Peru), taking the silver medal.

He currently has the third best mark in the history of Española in the 10 km test with 27'59" and a half marathon with 1h00'58".
