= Andrea Ramírez Limón =

Mexican long-distance runner

Personal information
- Born: 5 December 1992 (age 32) Chimalhuacán, Mexico

Sport
- Country: Mexico
- Sport: Athletics
- Event: Marathon

Andrea Soraya Ramírez Limón (born 5 December 1992) is a Mexican marathon runner. She is part of the Mexican delegation at the 2020 Summer Olympics.

== Personal life ==
Ramírez has a degree in international relations from the Monterrey Institute of Technology and Higher Education, having obtained it in 2015.

== Career ==
While Ramírez was training as a hobby on the track at her college, one of her coaches encouraged her to officially compete. For a time, Ramírez ran various athletic events informally, until she requested the assistance of a professional marathoner, Jonathan Morales Serrano. Morales refused by telling her that he did not train women, which led Ramírez to ask him to let her convince him, a fact that happened after six months of practice. Morales trained her for two and a half years.

Ramírez's career grew when she ran a half marathon in Monterrey in November 2019, clocking a time of 1:12:44, a fact that allowed her to qualify to run the half marathon in Gdynia, Poland. In this competition, she clocked a time of 1:10:20. In the 2020 Houston Marathon she achieved a mark of 2:29:30; In December 2020 she improved the time, achieving the required mark to qualify for the Tokyo 2020 Olympic Games, when she ran in The Marathon Project, a test that took place in Chandler, Arizona, United States, in a time of 2:26:34.
