= Samantha Harrison (runner) =

British long-distance runner (born 1995)

Personal information
- Nationality: British
- Born: 1 February 1995 (age 30)
- Home town: Nottingham, England

Sport
- Country: Great Britain & N.I.
- Sport: Athletics
- Event: Long-distance running
- Coached by: Vince Wilson

Achievements and titles
- Commonwealth finals: 2022 Birmingham; 10,000 m, 6th

Samantha Harrison (born 1 February 1995) is a British long-distance runner. She finished sixth in the 10,000 metres at the 2022 Commonwealth Games in Birmingham. Harrison also placed sixth in the event at the 2022 European Championships held in Munich.

== Career ==
In 2019, Harrison won the women's half marathon at the Nottingham Marathon staged in Nottingham, England.

In 2020, she competed in the women's half marathon at the 2020 World Athletics Half Marathon Championships held in Gdynia, Poland.

On 3 December 2022, Harrison set a new parkrun record for the fastest female with a time of 15 minutes 37 seconds at Long Eaton parkrun.

On 23 April 2023, the 28-year-old competed in the London Marathon and was the top finishing Briton in 11th with a time of 2:25:59. She chopped six minutes from her personal best and went sixth on the UK women's all-time list. Harrison was quicker than the qualifying standard for the 2024 Summer Olympics.
