= Susan Jeptooo =

French long-distance runner

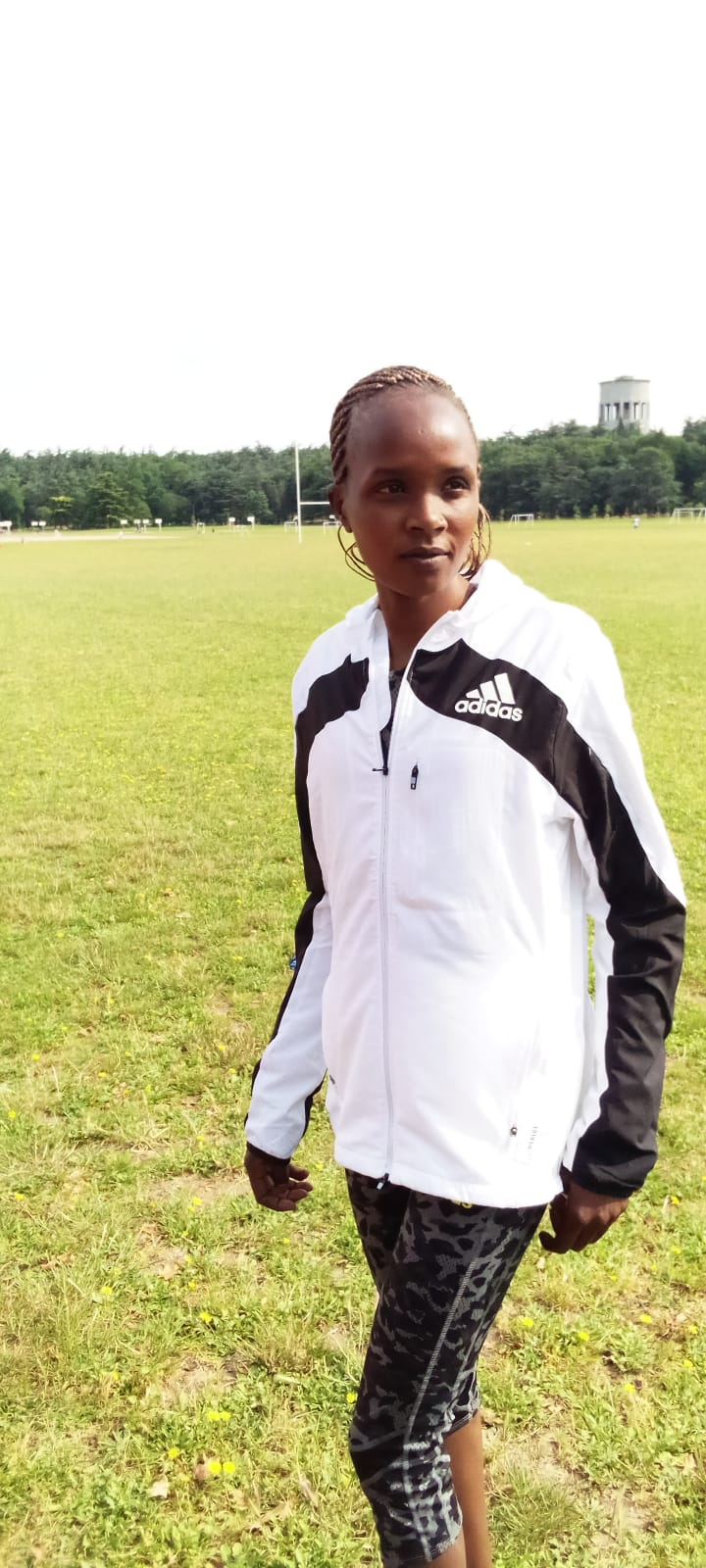
- Jeptoo in 2021

Personal information
- Full name: Susan Kipsang Jeptooo
- Nationality: French
- Born: 7 March 1987 (age 39) Kapsabet, Kenya
- Height: 1.63 m (5 ft 4 in)
- Weight: 45 kg (99 lb)

Sport
- Country: France
- Sport: Track and Field
- Event: Marathon
- Club: Athlé Saint-Julien 74
- Coached by: Saadi Harzouz

Susan Kipsang Jeptooo (born 7 March 1987) is a French long distance runner.

== Career ==
Born in Kapsabet, Kenya, she runs in the marathon and half marathon, 5,000m, 10,000m, and cross-country.

In 2008, she put her career on hiatus due to pregnancy. In June 2009, she moved to Lyon in France along with her husband Jakub, and in 2011 began racing again with the Lyon Athletics Club after the births of Kelvin in 2008, then of Mercy in 2011. In 2019 she gained French nationality.

She ran the World Athletics Half Marathon Championships, in Gdynia in 2020, and finished runner up at the French national championships in the 10,000m.

On 10 January 2021 she achieved the Olympic qualifying standard in the marathon in Marrakesh, running 2:28:48 seconds. She was subsequently named in the French team for the marathon in the delayed 2020 Tokyo Olympics.

== Doping violation ==
She received an 18 months suspension for a positive test for heptaminol on 4 September 2021.
