= Belarus at the 2018 European Athletics Championships =

- WA code: BLR
- National federation: BFLA
- Website: www.bfla.eu

in Berlin
- Competitors: 38
- Medals Ranked 7th: Gold 3 Silver 1 Bronze 3 Total 7

European Athletics Championships appearances
- 1994; 1998; 2002; 2006; 2010; 2012; 2014; 2016; 2018; 2022–2024

Other related appearances
- Soviet Union (1946–1990)

Belarus competed at the 2018 European Athletics Championships in Berlin, Germany, from 6–12 August 2018. A delegation of 38 athletes were sent to represent the country.

The following athletes were selected to compete by the Belarus Athletics Federation.

== Medals ==
Medal	Name	Event	Date
Gold	Elvira Herman	Women's 100 metres hurdles	9 August
Gold	Volha Mazuronak	Women's marathon	12 August
Gold	Maryna Damantsevich; Volha Mazuronak; Nastassia Ivanova; Nina Savina; Iryna Somava	Marathon Cup	12 August
Silver	Maksim Nedasekau	Men's high jump	11 August
Bronze	Dzmitry Dziubin	Men's 50 km walk	7 August
Bronze	Aliona Dubitskaya	Women's shot put	8 August
Bronze	Vitaliy Zhuk	Men's decathlon	8 August

== Results ==
Men
Track and road

Athletes	Event	Heats		Semifinal		Final	
Athletes	Event	Result	Rank	Result	Rank	Result	Rank
Vitali Parakhonka	110 metres hurdles	—		13.69	20	did not advance	
Aliaksandr Liakhovich	20 km walk	—				1:24:07	18
Dzmitry Dziubin	50 km walk	—				3:47:59 PB	3rd place, bronze medalist(s)

Field events

Athletes	Event	Qualification		Final	
Athletes	Event	Distance	Position	Distance	Position
Maksim Nedasekau	High jump	2.25	1 q	2.33 =PB	2nd place, silver medalist(s)
Andrei Skabeika	High jump	2.11	26	did not advance	
Uladzislau Chamarmazovich	Pole vault	5.36	26	did not advance	
Aliaksei Nichypar	Shot put	19.97	8 q	20.27	10
Pavel Mialeshka	Javelin throw	73.55	23	did not advance	
Pavel Bareisha	Hammer throw	76.47	3 Q	77.02	4
Hleb Dudarau	Hammer throw	72.19	18	did not advance	
Ivan Tikhon	Hammer throw	74.67	9 q	75.79 SB	6

Combined events – Decathlon

Athlete	Event	100 m	LJ	SP	HJ	400 m	110H	DT	PV	JT	1500 m	Final	Rank
Maksim Andraloits	Result	11.00	6.97	15.33 PB	2.02	48.56 PB	DNF	41.02	DNS	did not finish			
Maksim Andraloits	Points	861	807	810	822	882	0	685	0	did not finish			
Yury Yaremich	Result	10.96 =SB	7.55	12.89	2.02	50.03 SB	14.74	39.97 PB	4.90	59.12	4:51.10 SB	7875	11
Yury Yaremich	Points	870	947	661	822	813	881	664	880	725	612	7875	11
Vitali Zhuk	Result	11.12	7.05	15.65 PB	1.99 SB	48.41 PB	14.66 SB	45.46	4.90 PB	66.19 PB	4:30.81	8290	3rd place, bronze medalist(s)
Vitali Zhuk	Points	834	826	830	794	889	891	776	880	831	739	8290	3rd place, bronze medalist(s)

Women
Track and road

Athletes	Event	Heats		Semifinal		Final	
Athletes	Event	Result	Rank	Result	Rank	Result	Rank
Krystsina Tsimanouskaya	100 metres	—		11.34	13	did not advance	
Krystsina Tsimanouskaya	200 metres	23.07 NU23R	2 Q	23.03 NU23R	10	did not advance	
Daryia Barysevich	800 metres	2:04.65	28	did not advance			
Daryia Barysevich	1500 metres	4:09.32	7 q	—		4:07.52	8
Sviatlana Kudzelich	10,000 metres	—				32:46.34	8
Maryna Damantsevich	Marathon	—				2:27:44 PB	4
Nastassia Ivanova	Marathon	—				2:27:49 SB	5
Volha Mazuronak	Marathon	—				2:26:22	1st place, gold medalist(s)
Nina Savina	Marathon	—				2:33:50 PB	12
Iryna Somava	Marathon	—				did not finish	
Volha Mazuronak; Maryna Damantsevich; Nastassia Ivanova; Nina Savina; Iryna Somava	Marathon Cup	—				7:21:54	1st place, gold medalist(s)
Elvira Herman	100 metres hurdles	—		12.76	2 Q	12.67	1st place, gold medalist(s)
Alina Talay	100 metres hurdles	—		12.96	11 Q	did not finish	
Sviatlana Kudzelich	3000 metres steeplechase	9:47.89 SB	23	—		did not advance	
Viktoryia Rashchupkina	20 km walk	—				1:33:12	17
Nadzeya Darazhuk	50 km walk	—				4:35:14	11
Nastassia Yatsevich	50 km walk	—				did not finish	

Field events

Athletes	Event	Qualification		Final	
Athletes	Event	Distance	Position	Distance	Position
Karina Taranda	High jump	1.86	12 q	1.87	12
Iryna Zhuk	Pole vault	4.45	4 q	4.55	7
Nastassia Mironchyk-Ivanova	Long jump	6.68	6 Q	6.58	5
Violetta Skvartsova	Triple jump	13.82	21	did not advance	
Iryna Vaskouskaya	Triple jump	13.90	17	did not advance	
Alena Abramchuk	Shot put	17.17	12 q	16.90	12
Aliona Dubitskaya	Shot put	18.67	2 Q	18.81	3rd place, bronze medalist(s)
Viktoryia Kolb	Shot put	17.36	8 Q	17.50	8
Tatsiana Khaladovich	Javelin throw	61.21	5 Q	60.92	5
Hanna Malyshik	Hammer throw	72.39	4 Q	No mark	
