= Belarus at the 2020 Summer Olympics =

- IOC code: BLR
- NOC: Belarus Olympic Committee
- Website: www.noc.by (in Russian and English)

in Tokyo, Japan July 23, 2021 – August 8, 2021
- Competitors: 101 in 17 sports
- Flag bearers (opening): Hanna Marusava; Mikita Tsmyh
- Flag bearer (closing): Ilya Palazkov
- Medals Ranked 45th: Gold 1 Silver 3 Bronze 3 Total 7

Summer Olympics appearances (overview)
- 1996; 2000; 2004; 2008; 2012; 2016; 2020; 2024

Other related appearances
- Russian Empire (1900–1912); Poland (1924–1936); Soviet Union (1952–1988); Unified Team (1992); Individual Neutral Athletes (2024)

Belarus competed at the 2020 Summer Olympics in Tokyo. Originally scheduled to take place from 24 July to 9 August 2020, the Games were postponed to 23 July to 8 August 2021, because of the COVID-19 pandemic. This was Belarus' last appearance at the Summer Olympics as Belarus along with Russia was barred from competing at the 2024 Summer Olympics in Paris as a result of the ongoing Russian invasion of Ukraine. It was the nation's seventh consecutive appearance at the Summer Olympics in the post-Soviet era.

== Background ==
=== IOC sanctions ===
For several years, the Belarus Olympic Committee (NOC RB) has been accused of political discrimination in its selection and treatment of athletes. Accusations and athlete tensions came to a head in 2020 after the disputed re-election of Belarusian president Alexander Lukashenko, also the NOC RB chairman at the time, and the widespread protests that followed. The NOC RB was allegedly associated with the torture of athletes who have spoken out against Lukashenko, which the International Olympic Committee (IOC) has been investigating.

Before the Games, the IOC restricted the NOC RB for athletes' rights violations twice (the first in December 2020 and the second in March 2021). The 2020 measures included the banning of all NOC RB officials from Olympic events; the suspension of financial support from the NOC RB; the active involvement of political neutrality for Belarusian athletes; the Belarusian ban from hosting any Olympic events; and the request of all other Olympic members to accept the measures in the interest of the safety of Belarusian athletes. The 2021 measures reiterated the previous set, as well as stating that the IOC did not acknowledge NOC RB officials holding the government positions and requesting that Olympic selection in Belarus proved non-political.

After the second sanctions in March 2021, and the IOC did not recognize the NOC RB leadership election results in the same month, other national committees and sports organizations heeded a plea for Belarus to get banned from the rescheduled Tokyo 2020, forcing the athletes to compete independently under the Olympic flag.

== Medalists ==
Medal	Name	Sport	Event	Date
Gold	Ivan Litvinovich	Gymnastics	Men's trampoline	31 July
Silver	Iryna Kurachkina	Wrestling	Women's freestyle 57 kg	5 August
Silver	Magomedkhabib Kadimagomedov	Wrestling	Men's freestyle 74 kg	6 August
Silver	Volha Khudzenka; Maryna Litvinchuk; Marharyta Makhneva; Nadzeya Papok	Canoeing	Women's K-4 500 metres	7 August
Bronze	Maksim Nedasekau	Athletics	Men's high jump	1 August
Bronze	Vanesa Kaladzinskaya	Wrestling	Women's freestyle 53 kg	6 August
Bronze	Alina Harnasko	Gymnastics	Women's rhythmic individual all-around	7 August

== Competitors ==
The following is the list of number of competitors participating in the Games:

Sport	Men	Women	Total
Archery	0	3	3
Artistic swimming	—N/a	2	2
Athletics	12	18	30
Boxing	4	0	4
Canoeing	6	10	16
Cycling	2	2	4
Equestrian	2	0	2
Gymnastics	3	7	10
Judo	2	1	3
Modern pentathlon	1	2	3
Rowing	2	3	5
Sailing	1	1	2
Shooting	1	2	3
Swimming	4	2	6
Tennis	2	1	3
Weightlifting	1	1	2
Wrestling	5	3	8
Total	48	58	106

== Archery ==
Three Belarusian archers qualified for the women's events by reaching the quarterfinal stage of the women's team recurve at the 2019 World Archery Championships in 's-Hertogenbosch, Netherlands.

Athlete	Event	Ranking round		Round of 64	Round of 32	Round of 16	Quarterfinals	Semifinals	Final / BM	
Athlete	Event	Score	Seed	Opposition Score	Opposition Score	Opposition Score	Opposition Score	Opposition Score	Opposition Score	Rank
Karyna Dziominskaya	Women's individual	642	29	Siddique (BAN); W 6–5	Valencia (MEX); L 3–7	Did not advance				
Karyna Kazlouskaya	Women's individual	607	61	Valencia (MEX); L 0–6	Did not advance					
Hanna Marusava	Women's individual	633	39	Unruh (GER); W 6–4	Yamauchi (JPN); W 6–0	Boari (ITA); L 5–6	Did not advance			
Karyna Dziominskaya; Karyna Kazlouskaya; Hanna Marusava	Women's team	1882	12	—N/a		China; W 5–3	Japan; W 5–3	South Korea; L 1–5	Germany; L 1–5	4

== Artistic swimming ==
Belarus fielded a squad of two artistic swimmers to compete in the women's duet event, by winning the bronze medal at the 2021 FINA Olympic Qualification Tournament in Barcelona, Spain.

Athlete	Event	Technical routine		Free routine (preliminary)			Free routine (final)		
Athlete	Event	Points	Rank	Points	Total (technical + free)	Rank	Points	Total (technical + free)	Rank
Vasilina Khandoshka; Daria Kulagina	Duet	87.2101	10	88.0333	175.2434	10 Q	87.8000	175.0101	11

== Athletics ==
Belarusian athletes further achieved the entry standards, either by qualifying time or by world ranking, in the following track and field events (up to a maximum of 3 athletes in each event):

Belarusian athletes were scheduled to participate in the women's 4 × 400 metres relay. On July 28, two athletes, Hanna Mikhailava (Belarusian: Ганна Міхайлава; Russian: Анна Михайлова) and Krystsina Muliarchyk (Belarusian: Крысціна Мулярчык; Russian: Кристина Мулярчик), were declared ineligible due to insufficient number of doping tests made. This situation forced Belarusian sport authorities to replace them. Sprinter Krystsina Tsimanouskaya (100 m and 200 m) was chosen to be one of the substitutes; however, she claimed that this decision was made without her consent and criticized the national sport authorities.

On 1 August 2021, Tsimanouskaya was expelled from further competitions by the national sports authorities, reportedly as a consequence of her criticism. On the same day, the Belarusian sports officials tried to put her on a plane against her will. She sought the protection of police in Tokyo airport and declared that she was not planning to return to Belarus. According to the national athletics team officials, she was expelled for her "emotional and psychological state" after medical examination, but Tsimanouskaya denied that statement. She asked the International Olympic Committee for help.

The four athletes who eventually contested the event – Aliaksandra Khilmanovich, Yuliya Bliznets, Elvira Herman and Asteria Uzo Limai – came last of all nations in the heats and did not advance.

Key

- Note–Ranks given for track events are within the athlete's heat only
- Q = Qualified for the next round
- q = Qualified for the next round as a fastest loser or, in field events, by position without achieving the qualifying target
- NR = National record
- N/A = Round not applicable for the event
- Bye = Athlete not required to compete in round

Track & road events
Men

Athlete	Event	Heat		Semifinal		Final	
Athlete	Event	Time	Rank	Time	Rank	Time	Rank
Vitali Parakhonka	110 m hurdles	13.61	5	Did not advance			
Aliaksandr Liakhovich	20 km walk	—N/a				1:31:28	45
Dzmitry Dziubin	50 km walk	—N/a				4:00:25	22

Women

Athlete	Event	Heat		Quarterfinal		Semifinal		Final	
Athlete	Event	Time	Rank	Time	Rank	Time	Rank	Time	Rank
Krystsina Tsimanouskaya	100 m	Bye		11.47	4	Did not advance			
Krystsina Tsimanouskaya	200 m	DNS		—N/a		Did not advance			
Elvira Herman	100 m hurdles	12.95	4 Q	—N/a		12.71	5	Did not advance	
Yuliya Bliznets; Elvira Herman; Aliaksandra Khilmanovich; Asteria Limai	4 × 400 m relay	3:33.00	8	—N/a				Did not advance	
Volha Mazuronak	Marathon	—N/a						2:29:06	5
Nina Savina	Marathon	—N/a						2:38:41	50
Anastasiya Rarouskaya	20 km walk	—N/a						1:35:09	23
Viktoryia Rashchupkina	20 km walk	—N/a						1:43:33	49
Anna Terlyukevich	20 km walk	—N/a						1:37:22	31

Field events
Men

Athlete	Event	Qualification		Final	
Athlete	Event	Distance	Position	Distance	Position
Dzmitry Nabokau	High jump	2.25	=14	Did not advance	
Maksim Nedasekau	High jump	2.28	12 q	2.37 NR	3rd place, bronze medalist(s)
Yauheni Bahutski	Discus throw	58.65	27	Did not advance	
Aliaksei Katkavets	Javelin throw	82.72	9 q	83.71	6
Pavel Mialeshka	Javelin throw	82.64	11 q	82.28	10
Hleb Dudarau	Hammer throw	71.60	27	Did not advance	
Ivan Tsikhan	Hammer throw	74.57	18	Did not advance	
Yury Vasilchanka	Hammer throw	74.00	19	Did not advance	

Women

Athlete	Event	Qualification		Final	
Athlete	Event	Distance	Position	Distance	Position
Nastassia Mironchyk-Ivanova	Long jump	6.55	14	Did not advance	
Viyaleta Skvartsova	Triple jump	14.05	18	Did not advance	
Karyna Demidik	High jump	1.90	=19	Did not advance	
Iryna Zhuk	Pole vault	4.55	=8 q	4.50	8
Aliona Dubitskaya	Shot put	18.89	3 Q	18.73	9
Tatsiana Khaladovich	Javelin throw	60.78	13	Did not advance	
Hanna Malyshchyk	Hammer throw	70.80	13	Did not advance	
Nastassia Maslava	Hammer throw	65.15	28	Did not advance	

Combined events – Men's decathlon

Athlete	Event	100 m	LJ	SP	HJ	400 m	110H	DT	PV	JT	1500 m	Final	Rank
Vitali Zhuk	Result	11.04	6.93	16.23	1.96	49.22	14.95	47.01	5.10	59.49	4:42.57	8131	13
Vitali Zhuk	Points	852	797	865	767	851	856	808	941	730	664	8131	13

== Boxing ==
Belarus entered four male boxers into the Olympic tournament. Dzmitry Asanau scored a round-of-16 victory to secure a spot in the men's lightweight division at the 2020 European Qualification Tournament in Villebon-sur-Yvette, France.

Athlete	Event	Round of 32	Round of 16	Quarterfinals	Semifinals	Final	
Athlete	Event	Opposition Result	Opposition Result	Opposition Result	Opposition Result	Opposition Result	Rank
Dzmitry Asanau	Men's lightweight	Al-Kasbeh (JOR); W 5–0	Oliveira (BRA); L 2–3	Did not advance			
Aliaksandr Radzionau	Men's welterweight	Ekinci (TUR); W 3–2	McCormack (GBR); L 0–5	Did not advance			
Vitali Bandarenka	Men's middleweight	Isley (USA); L 0–5	Did not advance				
Uladzislau Smiahlikau	Men's heavyweight	Bye	Plodzicki-Faoagali (SAM); W 4–1	Nyika (NZL); L 0–5	Did not advance		

== Canoeing ==
=== Sprint ===
Belarusian canoeists qualified a total of eight boats in each of the following distances for the Games through the 2019 ICF Canoe Sprint World Championships in Szeged, Hungary.

Men

Athlete	Event	Heats		Quarterfinals		Semifinals		Final	
Athlete	Event	Time	Rank	Time	Rank	Time	Rank	Time	Rank
Aleh Yurenia	K-1 1000 m	3:43.444	1 SF	Bye		3:27.323	6 FB	3:27.190	12
Mikita Borykau; Aleh Yurenia	K-2 1000 m	3:18.952	5 QF	3:10.126	1 SF	3:18.875	3 FA	3:17.769	7
Mikita Borykau; Ilya Fedarenka; Uladzislau Litvinau; Dzmitry Natynchyk	K-4 500 m	1:22.896	3 QF	1:23.848	2 SF	1:24.206	3 FA	1:24.510	5

Women

Athlete	Event	Heats		Quarterfinals		Semifinals		Final	
Athlete	Event	Time	Rank	Time	Rank	Time	Rank	Time	Rank
Alena Nazdrova	C-1 200 m	46.731	3 QF	46.950	1 SF	48.120	5 FB	48.085	11
Nadzeya Makarchanka; Daryna Pikuleva	C-2 500 m	2:09.799	6 QF	2:04.951	3 SF	2:07.205	5 FB	2:04.351	10
Volha Khudzenka	K-1 500 m	1:50.732	3 SF	Bye		1:52.755	3 FB	1:55.933	14
Maryna Litvinchuk	K-1 500 m	1:49.606	2 SF	Bye		1:56.386	5 FC	1:57.057	22
Volha Khudzenka; Maryna Litvinchuk	K-2 500 m	1:43.377	2 SF	Bye		1:37.198	3 FA	1:37.647	6
Volha Khudzenka; Maryna Litvinchuk; Marharyta Makhneva; Nadzeya Papok	K-4 500 m	1:34.785	3 QF	1:35.534	1 SF	1:36.672	2 FA	1:36.073	2nd place, silver medalist(s)

Qualification Legend: FA = Qualify to final (medal); FB = Qualify to final B (non-medal); SF = Qualify to semifinal round; QF = Qualify to quarterfinal round

== Cycling ==
=== Road ===
Belarus entered one rider each to compete in the men's and women's Olympic road races, by virtue of his top 50 national finish (for men) and her top 22 (for women) in the UCI World Ranking.

Athlete	Event	Time	Rank
Aleksandr Riabushenko	Men's road race	6:21:46	66
Alena Amialiusik	Women's road race	3:55:05	17
Alena Amialiusik	Women's time trial	33:21.41	16

=== Track ===
Following the completion of the 2020 UCI Track Cycling World Championships, Belarus entered two riders to compete each in the men's and women's omnium, respectively, based on their final individual UCI Olympic rankings.

Omnium

Athlete	Event	Scratch race		Tempo race		Elimination race		Points race		Total	
Athlete	Event	Rank	Points	Rank	Points	Rank	Points	Rank	Points	Points	Rank
Yauheni Karaliok	Men's omnium	18	6	14	14	18	6	10	50	76	12
Tatsiana Sharakova	Women's omnium	11	20	15	12	19	4	14	0	36	16

== Equestrian ==
Belarus entered two eventing riders into the Olympic equestrian competition by securing the second and third of six available slots, respectively, outside the group and continental selection, in the individual FEI Olympic rankings. MeanwhIle, one dressage rider was added to the Belarusian roster by finishing in the top two, outside the group selection, of the individual FEI Olympic rankings for Group C (Central and Eastern Europe). Belarus later withdrew from competing in dressage.

Belarusian individuals for eventing were named on June 30, 2021. Aliaksandr Faminou and Martinie withdrew before the competition began.

=== Eventing ===
Athlete	Horse	Event	Dressage		Cross-country			Jumping						Total	
Athlete	Horse	Event	Dressage		Cross-country			Qualifier			Final			Total	
Athlete	Horse	Event	Penalties	Rank	Penalties	Total	Rank	Penalties	Total	Rank	Penalties	Total	Rank	Penalties	Rank
Alexander Zelenko	Carlo Grande Jr	Individual	31.00	18	61.60	92.60	46	Withdrew			Did not advance				

== Gymnastics ==
=== Artistic ===
Belarus initially entered two artistic gymnasts into the Olympic competition. Anastasiya Alistratava booked a spot in the women's individual all-around and apparatus events, by finishing fifteenth out of the twenty gymnasts eligible for qualification at the 2019 World Championships in Stuttgart, Germany. On the men's side, Rio 2016 Olympian Andrey Likhovitskiy received a spare berth from the apparatus events, as one of the seven highest-ranked gymnasts, neither part of the team nor qualified directly through the all-around, at the same tournament. Alistratava withdrew in July 2021, and her spot was given to teammate Hanna Traukova. Likhovitskiy also withdrew; however, his spot was given to Czech gymnast David Jessen.

Women

Athlete	Event	Qualification						Final					
Athlete	Event	Apparatus				Total	Rank	Apparatus				Total	Rank
Athlete	Event	V	UB	BB	F	Total	Rank	V	UB	BB	F	Total	Rank
Hanna Traukova	All-around	12.600	11.966	10.833	10.833	46.232	77	Did not advance					

=== Rhythmic ===
Belarus qualified a squad of rhythmic gymnasts for the individual and group all-around by finishing in the top 16 (for individual) and top 5 (for group), respectively, at the 2019 World Championships in Baku. The athletes for both the individual and group all-around were announced on 23 June 2021.

Athlete	Event	Qualification						Final					
Athlete	Event	Hoop	Ball	Clubs	Ribbon	Total	Rank	Hoop	Ball	Clubs	Ribbon	Total	Rank
Alina Harnasko	Individual	26.400	27.200	23.900	21.750	99.250	4 Q	26.500	27.500	27.400	21.100	102.700	3rd place, bronze medalist(s)
Anastasiia Salos	Individual	25.700	26.300	24.550	22.600	99.150	5 Q	25.425	23.000	24.950	21.800	95.175	8

Athletes	Event	Qualification				Final			
Athletes	Event	5 apps	3+2 apps	Total	Rank	5 apps.	3+2 apps	Total	Rank
Hanna Haidukevich; Anastasiya Malakanava; Anastasiya Rybakova; Arina Tsitsilina; Karyna Yarmolenka	Group	36.000	43.650	79.650	8 Q	45.750	38.300	84.050	5

=== Trampoline ===
Belarus qualified one gymnast for the men's trampoline by finishing in the top eight at the 2019 World Championships in Tokyo, Japan. An additional spot was earned through the 2019-2020 Trampoline World Cup series.

Athlete	Event	Qualification		Final	
Athlete	Event	Score	Rank	Score	Rank
Uladzislau Hancharou	Men's	113.400	2 Q	60.565	4
Ivan Litvinovich	Men's	113.555	1 Q	61.715	1st place, gold medalist(s)

== Judo ==
Belarus entered two judoka (one men and one woman) into the Olympic tournament based on the International Judo Federation Olympics Individual Ranking.

Athlete	Event	Round of 32	Round of 16	Quarterfinals	Semifinals	Repechage	Final / BM	
Athlete	Event	Opposition Result	Opposition Result	Opposition Result	Opposition Result	Opposition Result	Opposition Result	Rank
Dzmitry Minkou	Men's −66 kg	El-Idrissi (QAT); W 10–00	Yondonperenlei (MGL); L 00–10	Did not advance				
Maryna Slutskaya	Women's +78 kg	Wood (TTO); W 10–00	Han M-j (KOR); L 00–10	Did not advance				
Mikita Sviryd	Men's -100 kg	Frey (GER); L 00–10	Did not advance					

== Modern pentathlon ==
Belarusian athletes qualified for the following spots to compete in modern pentathlon. Iryna Prasiantsova secured her selection in the women's race by winning the bronze medal and finishing second among those eligible for Olympic qualification at the 2019 European Championships in Bath, England. She was joined by her fellow rookie Volha Silkina, who booked her place with a gold-medal victory at the 2019 UIPM World Championships in Budapest, Hungary. Iryna Prasiantsova doesn't participate because only 2 quotas for NOC are available.

Athlete	Event	Fencing (épée one touch)				Swimming (200 m freestyle)			Riding (show jumping)			Combined: shooting/running (10 m air pistol)/(3200 m)			Total points	Final rank
Athlete	Event	RR	BR	Rank	Points	Time	Rank	Points	Time	Rank	Points	Time	Rank	Points	Total points	Final rank
Ilya Palazkov	Men's	24-11	0	3	244	2:01.15	14	308	83.21	29	262	11:35.78	24	605	1419	17
Anastasiya Prokopenko	Women's	18–17	0	15	208	2:25.01	34	260	83.49	22	283	11:49.38	4	591	1342	8
Volha Silkina	Women's	21–14	1	12	217	2:15.22	17	280	89.07	23	274	12:59.81	23	521	1292	18

== Rowing ==
Belarus qualified three boats for each of the following rowing classes into the Olympic regatta. Rowing crews in the men's pair and women's lightweight double sculls confirmed Olympic places for their boats at the 2019 FISA World Championships in Ottensheim, Austria. Another Belarusian rower scored a runner-up finish to book one of the remaining boats available in the women's single sculls at the 2021 FISA Final Qualification Regatta in Lucerne, Switzerland.

Athlete	Event	Heats		Repechage		Quarterfinals		Semifinals		Final	
Athlete	Event	Time	Rank	Time	Rank	Time	Rank	Time	Rank	Time	Rank
Dzmitry Furman; Siarhei Valadzko	Men's pair	7:05.65	4 R	6:52.82	3 SA/B	—N/a		6:30.66	5 FB	6:25.88	8
Tatsiana Klimovich	Women's single sculls	7:51.86	2 QF	Bye		8:09.04	4 SC/D	7:33.78	2 FC	7:39.53	13
Alena Furman; Ina Nikulina	Women's lightweight double sculls	7:10.15	4 R	7:26.99	2 SA/B	—N/a		6:54.78	6 FB	6:57.84	11

Qualification Legend: FA=Final A (medal); FB=Final B (non-medal); FC=Final C (non-medal); FD=Final D (non-medal); FE=Final E (non-medal); FF=Final F (non-medal); SA/B=Semifinals A/B; SC/D=Semifinals C/D; SE/F=Semifinals E/F; QF=Quarterfinals; R=Repechage

== Sailing ==
Belarusian sailors qualified one boat in each of the following classes through the class-associated World Championships, and the continental regattas.

Athlete	Event	Race													Net points	Final rank
Athlete	Event	1	2	3	4	5	6	7	8	9	10	11	12	M*	Net points	Final rank
Mikita Tsirkun	Men's RS:X	17	10	23	17	~~26~~	19	21	12	18	23	20	20	EL	200	18
Tatiana Drozdovskaya	Women's Laser Radial	~~25~~	22	20	25	20	8	17	19	23	19	—N/a		EL	173	21

M = Medal race; EL = Eliminated – did not advance into the medal race

== Shooting ==
Belarusian shooters achieved quota places for the following events by virtue of their best finishes at the 2018 ISSF World Championships, the 2019 ISSF World Cup series, European Championships or Games, and European Qualifying Tournament, as long as they obtained a minimum qualifying score (MQS) by 6 June 2021.

Set to compete at her sixth consecutive Games, Viktoria Chaika earned a direct place in the women's 10 m air pistol as the highest-ranked shooter vying for qualification in the ISSF World Olympic Rankings of 6 June 2021.

Athlete	Event	Qualification		Semifinal		Final	
Athlete	Event	Points	Rank	Points	Rank	Points	Rank
Yury Shcherbatsevich	Men's 10 m air rifle	626.6	15	—N/a		Did not advance	
Yury Shcherbatsevich	Men's 50 m rifle 3 positions	1176	8 Q	—N/a		406.3	7
Viktoria Chaika	Women's 10 m air pistol	576	11	—N/a		Did not advance	
Viktoria Chaika	Women's 25 m pistol	571	36	—N/a		Did not advance	
Maria Martynova	Women's 10 m air rifle	624.3	24	—N/a		Did not advance	
Maria Martynova	Women's 50 m rifle 3 positions	1166	17	—N/a		Did not advance	
Yury Shcherbatsevich; Maria Martynova	Mixed 10 m air rifle team	622.6	23	Did not advance			

== Swimming ==
Belarusian swimmers further achieved qualifying standards in the following events (up to a maximum of 2 swimmers in each event at the Olympic Qualifying Time (OQT), and potentially 1 at the Olympic Selection Time (OST)):

Men

Athlete	Event	Heat		Semifinal		Final	
Athlete	Event	Time	Rank	Time	Rank	Time	Rank
Ilya Shymanovich	100 m breaststroke	59.33	=9 Q	59.08	7 Q	59.36	8
Mikita Tsmyh	100 m backstroke	54.88	33	Did not advance			
Yauhen Tsurkin	100 m butterfly	52.90	42	Did not advance			
Artsiom Machekin; Ilya Shymanovich; Mikita Tsmyh; Yauhen Tsurkin	4 × 100 m medley relay	3:34.82	12	—N/a		Did not advance	

Women

Athlete	Event	Heat		Semifinal		Final	
Athlete	Event	Time	Rank	Time	Rank	Time	Rank
Anastasiya Shkurdai	100 m freestyle	55.17	28	Did not advance			
Anastasiya Shkurdai	100 m backstroke	DNS		Did not advance			
Anastasiya Shkurdai	100 m butterfly	56.99	7 Q	57.19	8 Q	57.05	8
Alina Zmushka	100 m breaststroke	1:07.58	21	Did not advance			
Alina Zmushka	200 m breaststroke	2:27.59	26	Did not advance			
Nastassia Karakouskaya; Anastasiya Kuliashova; Anastasiya Shkurdai; Alina Zmushka	4 × 100 m medley relay	4:00.49	12	—N/a		Did not advance	

Mixed

Athlete	Event	Heat		Final	
Athlete	Event	Time	Rank	Time	Rank
Anastasiya Kuliashova; Anastasiya Shkurdai; Ilya Shymanovich; Mikita Tsmyh	4 × 100 m medley relay	3:46.35	12	Did not advance	

== Tennis ==
Athlete	Event	Round of 64	Round of 32	Round of 16	Quarterfinals	Semifinals	Final / BM	
Athlete	Event	Opposition Score	Opposition Score	Opposition Score	Opposition Score	Opposition Score	Opposition Score	Rank
Egor Gerasimov	Men's singles	Simon (FRA); W 4–6, 6–3, 6–4	Fognini (ITA); L 4–6, 6–7^{(4–7)}	Did not advance				
Ilya Ivashka	Men's singles	Monfils (FRA); W 6–4, 4–6, 7–5	Kukushkin (KAZ); W 6–7^{(4–7)}, 6–3, 6–3	Nishikori (JPN); L 6–7^{(7–9)}, 0–6	Did not advance			
Egor Gerasimov; Ilya Ivashka	Men's doubles	—N/a	Daniell / Venus (NZL); L 3–6, 6–7^{(6–8)}	Did not advance				
Aryna Sabalenka	Women's singles	Linette (POL); W 6–2, 6–1	Vekić (CRO); L 4–6, 6–3, 6–7^{(3–7)}	Did not advance				

== Weightlifting ==
Belarusian weightlifters qualified for two quota places at the games, based on the Tokyo 2020 Rankings Qualification List of 11 June 2021.

Athlete	Event	Snatch		Clean & jerk		Total	Rank
Athlete	Event	Result	Rank	Result	Rank	Total	Rank
Yauheni Tsikhantsou	Men's –96 kg	173	6	~~201~~	DNF	173	DNF
Darya Naumava	Women's –76 kg	103	6	131	5	234	5

== Wrestling ==
Belarus qualified eight wrestlers for each of the following classes into the Olympic competition. Two of them finished among the top six to book Olympic spots in the men's Greco-Roman 87 kg and women's freestyle 57 kg at the 2019 World Championships, while five additional licenses were awarded to the Belarusian wrestlers, who progressed to the top two finals of their respective weight categories at the 2021 European Olympic Qualification Tournament in Budapest, Hungary. Another Belarusian wrestler claimed one of the remaining slots in the men's freestyle 74 kg to complete the nation's roster at the 2021 World Qualification Tournament in Sofia, Bulgaria.

Key:

- VT (ranking points: 5–0 or 0–5) – Victory by fall.
- VB (ranking points: 5–0 or 0–5) – Victory by injury (VF for forfeit, VA for withdrawal or disqualification)
- PP (ranking points: 3–1 or 1–3) – Decision by points – the loser with technical points.
- PO (ranking points: 3–0 or 0–3) – Decision by points – the loser without technical points.
- ST (ranking points: 4–0 or 0–4) – Great superiority – the loser without technical points and a margin of victory of at least 8 (Greco-Roman) or 10 (freestyle) points.
- SP (ranking points: 4–1 or 1–4) – Technical superiority – the loser with technical points and a margin of victory of at least 8 (Greco-Roman) or 10 (freestyle) points.

Freestyle

Athlete	Event	Round of 16	Quarterfinal	Semifinal	Repechage	Final / BM	
Athlete	Event	Opposition Result	Opposition Result	Opposition Result	Opposition Result	Opposition Result	Rank
Magomedkhabib Kadimagomedov	Men's−74 kg	Garzón (CUB); W 3–1 ^{PP}	Dake (USA); W 4–0 ^{ST}	Chamizo (ITA); W 3–1 ^{PP}	Bye	Sidakov (ROC); L 0–3 ^{PO}	2nd place, silver medalist(s)
Ali Shabanau	Men's−86 kg	Taylor (USA); L 0–4 ^{ST}	Did not advance		Amine (SMR); L 0–3 ^{PO}	Did not advance	16
Aliaksandr Hushtyn	Men's –97 kg	Salas (CUB); L 3-4 ^{PP}	Did not advance				12
Dzianis Khramiankou	Men's –125 kg	Mönkhtör (MGL); L 1–3 ^{PO}	Did not advance				9
Vanesa Kaladzinskaya	Women's −53 kg	Ana (ROU); W 4–0 ^{ST}	Phogat (IND); W 5–0 ^{VT}	Pang Qy (CHN); L 2–2 ^{PP}	Bye	Winchester (USA); W 5–0 ^{VT}	3rd place, bronze medalist(s)
Iryna Kurachkina	Women's −57 kg	Malik (IND); W 3–1 ^{PP}	Koblova (ROC); W 3–1 ^{PP}	Nikolova (BUL); W 4–0 ^{ST}	Bye	Kawai (JPN); L 0–3 ^{PO}	2nd place, silver medalist(s)
Vasilisa Marzaliuk	Women's −76 kg	Rotter-Focken (GER); L 1–3 ^{PP}	Did not advance		Zhou Q (CHN); L 1–3 ^{PP}	Did not advance	9

Greco-Roman

Athlete	Event	Round of 16	Quarterfinal	Semifinal	Repechage	Final / BM	
Athlete	Event	Opposition Result	Opposition Result	Opposition Result	Opposition Result	Opposition Result	Rank
Kiryl Maskevich	Men's −87 kg	Metwally (EGY); L 1–4 ^{SP}	Did not advance				15

== Controversies ==
=== Disqualification of Belarusian athletes ===
On 28 July 2021, The Athletics Integrity Unit announced that Belarus was one of several countries which had failed to meet the minimum drug testing requirements as per "Rule 15", which requires at least three no-notice outside of competition blood and urine drug tests no less than three weeks apart for three of their athletics competitors. As such, three unnamed athletes were disqualified from participating in their events. It was later revealed that two of these athletes were runners Hanna Mikhailava and Krystsina Muliarchyk.

=== Removal of Krystsina Tsimanouskaya from Belarusian team ===
Tsimanouskaya qualified to participate at the Summer Olympics in the 100 m and 200 m events only. After several Belarusian athletes were disqualified due to not meeting the minimum drug testing requirements, national sport authorities entered her into the 4 × 400 m relay in addition to her planned events. Tsimanouskaya claimed that this decision was made without her consent and criticized the national sport authorities publicly on her Instagram account. On 1 August 2021, she was allegedly taken to Haneda Airport forcibly by the Belarus Olympic Committee. She refused to board a flight back to Belarus, and asked both the International Olympic Committee and Japan for assistance.

== See also ==
- Belarus at the 2020 Summer Paralympics
