= 2014 Belarusian Athletics Championships =

- Dates: 24–26 July
- Host city: Grodno
- Venue: Neman Stadium
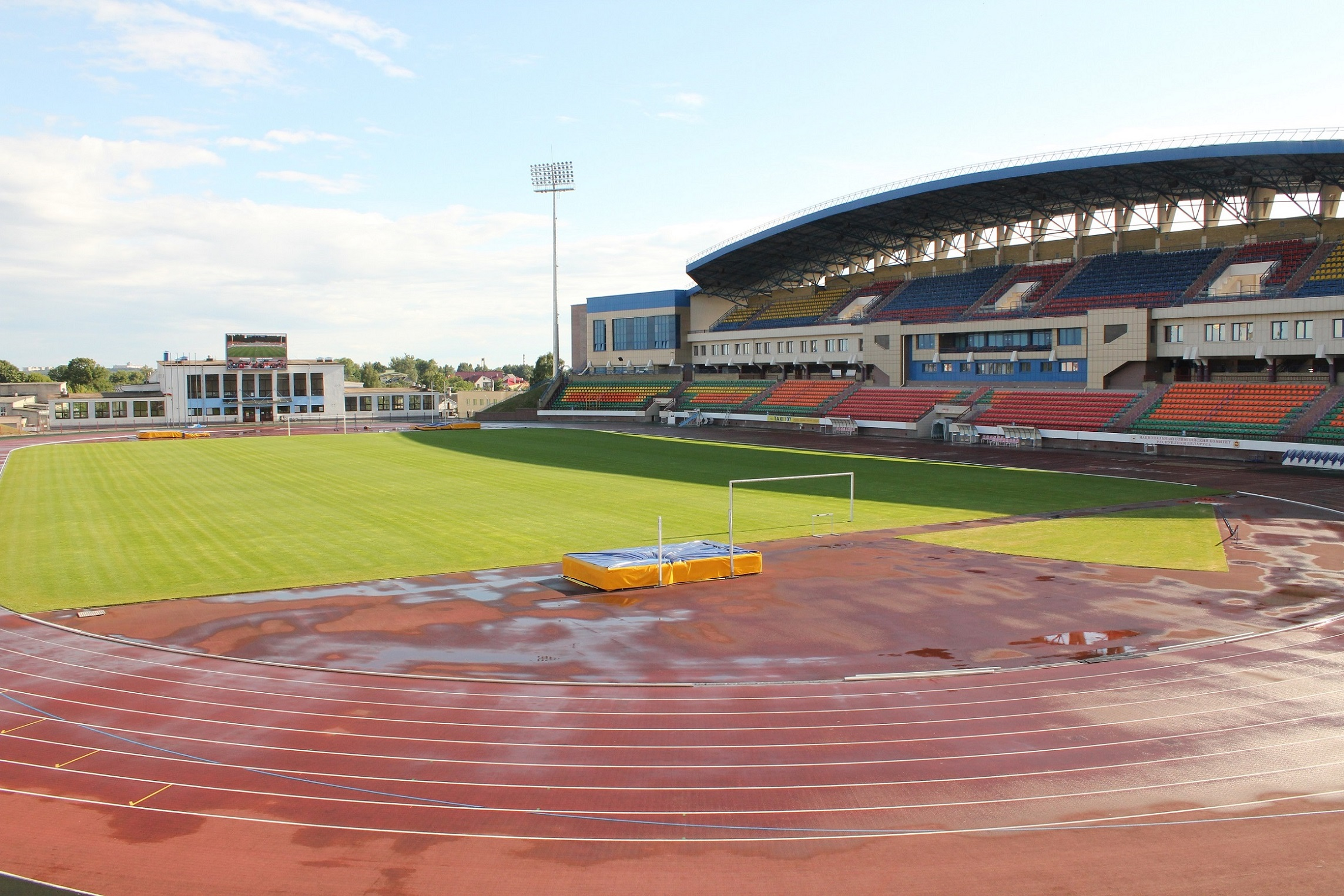
- Events: 42

The 2014 Belarusian Athletics Championships was the national championship in outdoor track and field for Belarus. It was held from 24–26 July at Neman Stadium in Grodno.

== Results ==
=== Men ===
Event	Gold		Silver		Bronze	
100 metres	Ilya Siratsyuk; Brest Region	10.60	Viktar Rabay; Brest Region	10.89	Siarhei Pustabaey; Grodno Region	10.90
200 metres	Alyaksandr Linnik; Vitebsk Region/Minsk Region	20.96	Ilya Siratsyuk; Brest Region	21.35	Siarhei Pustabaey; Grodno Region	21.90
400 metres	Alyaksandr Krasouski; Vitebsk Region	48.17	Maksim Lipayka; Vitebsk Region	48.29	Ehsan Mohajer Shojaei; Iran	48.58
800 metres	Amir Moradi; Iran	1:49.90	Maksim Yushchanka; Gomel Region/Brest Region	1:51.07	Siarhei Krylou; Brest Region	1:51.45
1500 metres	Siarhei Platonau; Mogilev Region	3:45.91	Siarhei Krylou; Brest Region	3:46.86	Maksim Yushchanka; Gomel Region/Brest Region	3:47.35
5000 metres	Genadz' Verkhavodkin; Grodno Region	14:21.60	Siarhei Platonau; Mogilev Region	14:21.61	Ilya Slavenski; Gomel Region	14:29.35
10,000 metres	Ilya Slavenski; Gomel Region	29:57.15	Maksim Pankratay; Vitebsk Region	29:59.90	Genadz' Verkhavodkin; Grodno Region	30:28.52
3000 m s'chase	Alyaksandr Tsyareshchankay; Brest Region/Mogilev Region	9:01.32	Dzmitryy Ivanenka; Gomel Region	9:09.73	Yuryy Kaptseray; Mogilev Region/Vitebsk Region	9:14.89
110 m hurdles	Maksim Lynsha; Vitebsk Region/Brest Region	13.82	Vital Parakhonka; Vitebsk Region	13.93	Mikalay Shubyanok; Minsk	15.02
400 m hurdles	Siarhei Syarkou; Mogilev Region	51.26	Mikita Yakayley; Grodno Region	51.98	Vadzim Kebets; Mogilev Region	52.13
High jump	Andrey Churyla; Brest Region	2.24 m	Anton Bodnar; Kazakhstan	2.20 m	Artsem Zaytsay; Grodno Region/Vitebsk Region	2.16 m
Pole vault	Stanislay Tsivonchyk; Brest Region	5.20 m	Mohsen Rabbani; Iran	5.00 m	Dzmitryy Gashchuk; Brest Region	4.80 m
Long jump	Kanstantsin Barycheyski; Brest Region	7.81 m (+3.3 m/s)	Alyaksey Chygareyski; Gomel Region	7.71 m (-1.0 m/s)	Yaygen Los; Gomel Region	7.54 m (+2.5 m/s)
Triple jump	Dzmitryy Platnitski; Brest Region	16.60 m (+0.5 m/s)	Alyaksey Tsapik; Mogilev Region	16.44 m (-1.2 m/s)	Maksim Nestsyarenka; Mogilev Region	16.13 m (+1.4 m/s)
Shot put	Pavel Lyzhyn; Mogilev Region/Brest Region	19.90 m	Mikhail Abramchuk; Mogilev Region/Brest Region	18.67 m	Maksim Zakharanka; Gomel Region	17.92 m
Discus throw	Pavel Lyzhyn; Mogilev Region/Brest Region	60.19 m	Siarhei Bashak; Gomel Region	55.61 m	Aleg Razanovich; Brest Region/Minsk	51.88 m
Hammer throw	Pavel Bareysha; Grodno Region	76.52 m	Siarhei Kalamoets; Grodno Region/Vitebsk Region	75.27 m	Pavel Kryvitski; Grodno Region	75.18 m
Javelin throw	Alyaksandr Ashomka; Gomel Region	77.51 m	Pavel Myaleshka; Grodno Region/Minsk	73.42 m	Mikalay Vasiltsou; Minsk Region	71.97 m
Decathlon	Alyaksandr Dzergachou; Vitebsk Region	7504 pts	Anatol Koshar; Grodno Region	7418 pts	Uladzimir Bilyuk; Brest Region	7369 pts
4 × 100 m relay	Gomel Region; Siarhei Lomanay; Dzyanis Bliznets; Siarhei Kresa; Alyaksey Chygareyski	41.65	Brest Region; Vadzim Saroka; Arseniy Zdanevich; Ilya Siratsyuk; Viktar Rabay	42.48	Vitebsk Region; Siarhei Zhurba; Yagor Papou; Artsem Raykou; Vital Parakhonka	42.81
4 × 400 m relay	Grodno Region; Siarhei Pustabaey; Mikhail Ramanay; Valyantsin Rogatney; Mikita Yakayley	3:11.37	Vitebsk Region; Dzmitryy Platonay; Maksim Lipayka; Alyaksandr Krasouski; Alyaksandr Linnik	3:12.14	Mogilev Region; Vadzim Kebets; Kiryl Klyuchnikay; Siarhei Bely; Siarhei Syarkou	3:16.81

=== Women ===
Event	Gold		Silver		Bronze	
100 metres	Katsyaryna Ganchar; Brest Region/Gomel Region	11.58	Krystsina Tsimanouskaya; Mogilev Region	11.97	Volga Astashka; Brest Region	12.00
200 metres	Katsyaryna Ganchar; Brest Region/Gomel Region	23.74	Krystsina Tsimanouskaya; Mogilev Region	24.14	Ilona Usovich; Minsk Region	24.26
400 metres	Ilona Usovich; Minsk Region	52.82	Alena Kievich; Brest Region	54.27	Katsyaryna Khayrulina; Gomel Region	54.30
800 metres	Volga Rulevich; Gomel Region/Vitebsk Region	2:05.34	Daryia Barysevich; Minsk	2:05.42	Ilona Ivanova; Mogilev Region	2:06.58
1500 metres	Svyatlana Kudzelich; Brest Region/Minsk	4:10.76	Daryia Barysevich; Minsk	4:12.47	Nastassia Puzakova; Mogilev Region	4:20.02
5000 metres	Nina Savina; Mogilev Region	16:28.03	Volga Kraytsova; Grodno Region	16:44.29	Tatstsyana Stsefanenka; Mogilev Region	16:56.56
10,000 metres	Volga Mazuronak; Minsk Region	33:02.18	Maryna Damantsevich; Vitebsk Region/Minsk Region	33:55.24	Svyatlana Kougan; Minsk	34:27.04
3000 m s'chase	Svyatlana Kudzelich; Brest Region/Minsk	09:43.94	Nastassia Puzakova; Mogilev Region	10:01.37	Alena Goshka; Vitebsk Region	11:43.77
100 m hurdles	Alina Talay; Vitebsk Region	12.99	Katsyaryna Paplayskaya; Gomel Region	13.24	Katsyaryna Artsyukh; Brest Region	13.46
400 m hurdles	Katsyaryna Artsyukh; Brest Region	57.10	Katsyaryna Khayrulina; Gomel Region	58.00	Maryna Bouka; Brest Region	1:00.49
High jump	Yana Maksimava; Vitebsk Region	1.90 m	Ganna Garodskaya; Mogilev Region	1.88 m	Maryya Sivenka; Vitebsk Region	1.80 m
Pole vault	Alina Vishneyskaya; Minsk	4.00 m	Iryna Yakaltsevich; Grodno Region	3.90 m	Ganna Shpak; Minsk	3.90 m
Long jump	Volga Sudarava; Gomel Region	6.67 m (+1.2 m/s)	Krystsina Aleynikava; Vitebsk Region	5.95 m (+1.4 m/s)	Ganna Kulinich; Gomel Region	5.70 m (+0.6 m/s)
Triple jump	Natallya Vyatkina; Grodno Region	14.35 m (+0.1 m/s)	Iryna Vaskouskaya; Minsk Region	13.56 m (+1.0 m/s)	Darya Kucharava; Brest Region	13.46 m (+1.9 m/s)
Shot put	Alena Dubitskaya; Grodno Region	19.03 m	Yuliya Leantsyuk; Brest Region	18.46 m	Alena Kopets; Brest Region	18.27 m
Discus throw	Anastasiya Kashtanava; Minsk	52.74 m	Alena Kopets; Brest Region	51.51 m	Alena Bochyna; Minsk	49.49 m
Hammer throw	Alena Navagrodskaya; Grodno Region	68.71 m	Ganna Zinchuk; Brest Region	67.53 m	Anastasiya Shatybelka; Vitebsk Region	66.15 m
Javelin throw	Tatstsyana Khaladovich; Brest Region	63.61 m	Volga Byalyak; Gomel Region	48.17 m	Tatstsyana Korzh; Minsk Region	46.02 m
Heptathlon	Katsyaryna Netsvyataeva; Gomel Region	6121 pts	Sepideh Tavakoly; Iran	5194 pts	Maryya Bachko; Grodno Region	4919 pts
4 × 100 m relay	Brest Region; Volga Astashka; Maryna Bouka; Alena Kievich; Katsyaryna Ganchar	46.19	Vitebsk Region; Krystsina Aleynikava; Katsyaryna Galkina; Ruslana Rashkavan; Alina Talay	47.57	Gomel Region; Katsyaryna Paplayskaya; Yuliya Kastsyuchkova; Anastasiya Zhygar; Kseniya Myadzvedzeva	47.60
4 × 400 m relay	Brest Region; Maryna Bouka; Galina Amyalyashchyk; Katsyaryna Artsyukh; Alena Kievich	3:43.11	Minsk; Natallya Khomich; Volga Padaliskaya; Katsyaryna Mishyna; Yuliya Petranevich	3:44.74	Gomel Region; Yuliya Kastsyuchkova; Volga Rulevich; Kseniya Myadzvedzeva; Katsyaryna Paplayskaya	3:46.89
