= Belarus at the 2016 European Athletics Championships =

- WA code: BLR
- National federation: BFLA
- Website: bfla.eu

in Amsterdam
- Competitors: 40 (12 men and 28 women) in 20 events
- Medals Ranked 12th: Gold 1 Silver 2 Bronze 0 Total 3

European Athletics Championships appearances
- 1994; 1998; 2002; 2006; 2010; 2012; 2014; 2016; 2018; 2022–2024

Other related appearances
- Soviet Union (1946–1990)

Belarus competed at the 2016 European Athletics Championships in Amsterdam, Netherlands, between 6 and 10 July 2016.

== Medals ==
| Medal | Name | Event | Date |
|---|---|---|---|
| Gold | Tatsiana Khaladovich | Women's javelin throw | 9 July |
| Silver | Alina Talay | Women's 100 m hurdles | 7 July |
| Silver | Ivan Tsikhan | Men's hammer throw | 10 July |

== Results ==
Men

Track & road events

| Athlete | Event | Heat | | Semifinal | | Final | |
| Athlete | Event | Result | Rank | Result | Rank | Result | Rank |
|---|---|---|---|---|---|---|---|
| Aliaksandr Linnik | 400 m | 47.09 | 12 q | 45.80 | 11 | did not advance | |

Field Events

| Athlete | Event | Qualification | | Final | |
| Athlete | Event | Distance | Rank | Distance | Rank |
|---|---|---|---|---|---|
| Dzmitry Nabokau | High jump | 2.09 | 23 | did not advance | |
| Pavel Seliverstau | High jump | 2.19 | =19 | did not advance | |
| Kanstantsin Barycheuski | Long jump | 8.08w | 4 Q | 7.67 | 8 |
| Artsem Bandarenka | Triple jump | 16.06w | 23 | did not advance | |
| Maksim Niastiarenka | Triple jump | 16.68 | 4 Q | 16.63 | 5 |
| Dzmitry Platnitski | Triple jump | 16.50w | 10 q | 16.18 | 11 |
| Mikhail Abramchuk | Shot put | 19.06 | 19 | did not advance | |
| Aliaksei Nichypor | Shot put | 19.34 | 18 | did not advance | |
| Pavel Bareisha | Hammer throw | 72.19 | 14 | did not advance | |
| Siarhei Kalamoyets | Hammer throw | 72.55 | 12 q | 74.65 | 6 |
| Ivan Tsikhan | Hammer throw | 76.10 | 2 Q | 78.84 | 2nd place, silver medalist(s) |

Women

Track & road events

| Athlete | Event | Heat | | Semifinal | | Final | |
| Athlete | Event | Result | Rank | Result | Rank | Result | Rank |
|---|---|---|---|---|---|---|---|
| Ilona Usovich | 400 m | 54.58 | 16 | did not advance | | | |
| Yuliya Karol | 800 m | 2:03.78 | 11 Q | 2:03.17 | 18 | did not advance | |
| Daryia Barysevich | 1500 m | 4:14.06 | 14 | — | | did not advance | |
| Elvira Herman | 100 m hurdles | 13.03 PB | 3 Q | 13.18 | 16 | did not advance | |
| Katsiaryna Paplauskaya | 100 m hurdles | — | | 13.04 | 13 | did not advance | |
| Alina Talay | 100 m hurdles | — | | 12.76 | 1 Q | 12.68 | 2nd place, silver medalist(s) |
| Katsiaryna Belanovich | 400 m hurdles | — | | 55.82 | 5 Q | 56.10 | 5 |
| Nastassia Puzakova | 3000 m steeplechase | 9:46.36 PB | 13 q | — | | 9:42.91 PB | 6 |
| Katsiaryna Khairullina; Alena Kievich; Ilona Usovich; Yulia Yurenia | 4 x 400 m relay | 3:31.23 SB | 9 | — | | did not advance | |
| Maryna Damantsevich | Half marathon | — | | | | 1:13:09 | 18 |
| Nastassia Ivanova | Half marathon | — | | | | 1:13:59 | 32 |
| Nina Savina | Half marathon | — | | | | 1:13:23 | 25 |
| Iryna Somava | Half marathon | — | | | | 1:14:44 | 37 |

Field Events

| Athlete | Event | Qualification | | Final | |
| Athlete | Event | Distance | Rank | Distance | Rank |
|---|---|---|---|---|---|
| Iryna Yakaltsevich | Pole vault | 4.35 | 11 q | 4.35 | 12 |
| Iryna Vaskouskaya | Triple jump | 13.61 | 17 | did not advance | |
| Natallia Viatkina | Triple jump | 13.35 | 21 | did not advance | |
| Aliona Dubitskaya | Shot put | 17.45 | 6 Q | 18.03 | 6 |
| Viktoryia Kolb | Shot put | 16.27 | 17 | did not advance | |
| Yulia Leantsiuk | Shot put | 17.35 | 8 Q | 18.20 | 4 |
| Tatsiana Khaladovich | Javelin throw | 59.37 | 8 q | 66.34 NR | 1st place, gold medalist(s) |
| Tatsiana Korzh | Javelin throw | DNS | | did not advance | |
| Alena Krechyk | Hammer throw | 64.42 | 24 | did not advance | |
| Hanna Malyshchyk | Hammer throw | 63.16 | 26 | did not advance | |
| Alena Sobaleva | Hammer throw | 66.78 | 15 | did not advance | |

Combined events – Heptathlon

| Athlete | Event | 100H | HJ | SP | 200 m | LJ | JT | 800 m | Final | Rank |
|---|---|---|---|---|---|---|---|---|---|---|
| Yana Maksimava | Result | 14.47 | 1.77 | 13.63 | 26.73 | 5.66 | 44.35 | 2:18.30 | 5702 | 12 |
| Yana Maksimava | Points | 913 | 941 | 769 | 734 | 747 | 751 | 847 | 5702 | 12 |
| Katsiaryna Netsviatayeva | Result | 14.20 | 1.71 | 14.82 | 25.61 | 5.91 | 46.36 PB | 2:13.72 | 6021 SB | 9 |
| Katsiaryna Netsviatayeva | Points | 950 | 867 | 849 | 832 | 822 | 790 | 911 | 6021 SB | 9 |
