= 2016 Belarusian Indoor Athletics Championships =

- Dates: 19–21 February
- Host city: Mogilev
- Venue: Olympic sports complex
- Events: 42

The 2016 Belarusian Indoor Athletics Championships was the year's national championship in indoor track and field for Belarus. It was held from 19–21 February at the Olympic sports complex in Mogilev.

== Results ==
=== Men ===
Event	Gold		Silver		Bronze	
60 metres	Viktar Rabau; Brest Region/Minsk	6.801	Yagor Papou; Vitebsk Region	6.803	Ilya Siratsyuk; Brest Region	6.88
60 m hurdles	Maksim Lynsha; Brest Region	7.71	Vital Parakhonka; Vitebsk Region	7.82	Arsen Zdanevich; Brest Region	8.27
200 metres	Ilya Siratsyuk; Brest Region	21.77	Maksim Lipauka; Vitebsk Region	21.78	Stanislau Daragakupets; Minsk	21.98
400 metres	Maksim Lipauka; Vitebsk Region	48.38	Petr Khadasevich; Minsk Region	48.70	Alyaksandr Krasouski; Vitebsk Region	48.76
800 metres	Yan Sloma; Grodno Region	1:50.11	Petr Khadasevich; Minsk Region	1:52.16	Andrey Kurys; Brest Region	1:52.45
1500 metres	Maksim Yushchanka; Gomel Region	3:47.12	Artsem Logish; Grodno Region	3:47.72	Syargey Platonau; Mogilev Region	3:49.70
3000 metres	Maksim Yushchanka; Gomel Region	8:13.44	Uladzislau Pramau; Gomel Region	8:16.06	Artsem Logish; Grodno Region	8:16.67
3000 m s'chase	Syargey Litouchyk; Brest Region	8:42.15	Ilya Slavenski; Gomel Region	8:51.07	Dzmitryy ivanenka Gomel Region	8:44.41
10,000 m walk	Alyaksandr Lyakhovich; Grodno Region	40:12.56	Dzmitryy Dzyubin; Minsk Region/Vitebsk Region	40:25.58	Yaugen Zaleski; Vitebsk Region	40:44.52
High jump	Dzmitryy Nabokau; Mogilev Region	2.29 m	Andrey Churyla; Brest Region	2.26 m	Andrey Skabeyka; Grodno Region	2.23 m
Pole vault	Dzmitryy Gashchuk; Brest Region/Mogilev Region	5.10 m	Stanislau Tsivonchyk; Brest Region	5.00 m	Igar Fedzik; Gomel Region	4.64 m
Long jump	Alyaksey Chygareuski; Gomel Region	7.83 m	Uladzimir Karobkin; Gomel Region/Minsk Region	7.44 m	Dzmitryy Platnitski; Brest Region	7.32 m
Triple jump	Maksim Nestsyarenka; Mogilev Region	16.45 m	Dzmitryy Platnitski; Brest Region	16.34 m	Kanstantsin Smal; Brest Region	16.03 m
Shot put	Pavel Lyzhkin; Mogilev Region/Brest Region	20.13 m	Mikhail Abramchuk; Mogilev Region/Brest Region	19.83 m	Alyaksey Nichypar; Grodno Region	19.02 m
4 × 400 m relay	Syargey Pustabaeu; Alyaksandr Tauruk; Mikhail Romanau; Yan Sloma; Grodno Region	3:17.62	Syargey Syarkou; Vadzim Kebets; Yaugen Shcharbo; Kiryl Klyuchnikau; Mogilev Region	3:17.74	Uladzimir Maskaleu; Mikalay Tsimantseeu; Alyaksandr Krasouski; Maksim Lipauka; Vitebsk Region	3:19.04

=== Women ===
Event	Gold		Silver		Bronze	
60 metres	Alina Talay; Vitebsk Region	7.42	Katsyaryna Ganchar; Brest Region/Gomel Region	7.48	Krystsina Tsimanouskaya; Mogilev Region	6.49
200 metres	Krystsina Radzivanyuk; Minsk/Brest Region	24.49	Katsyaryna Ganchar; Brest Region/Gomel Region	24.58	Alena Kievich; Brest Region	24.60
400 metres	Ilona Usovich; Minsk Region	53.93	Katsyaryna Belanovich; Brest Region	55.97	Yuliya Kastsyuchkova; Gomel Region	55.98
800 metres	Yuliya Karol; Grodno Region	2:05.07	Volga Rulevich; Gomel Region	2:05.75	Darya Barysevich; Minsk	2:05.90
1500 metres	Darya Barysevich; Minsk	4:13.87	Volga Rulevich; Gomel Region	4:16.95	Viktoryya Kushnir; Grodno Region	4:18.40
3000 metres	Svyatlana Kudzelich; Brest Region/Minsk	9:10.40	Svyatlana Stsefanenka; Mogilev Region	9:19.12	Nina Savina; Mogilev Region	9:21.20
60 m hurdles	Alina Talay; Vitebsk Region	7.97	Katsyaryna Palauskaya; Gomel Region	8.16	Elvira German; Brest Region	8.18
3000 m s'chase	Anastasiya Puzakova; Mogilev Region	10:14.23	Tatstsyana Shabanava; Mogilev Region	10:22.08	Alena Barysenka; Mogilev Region/Gomel Region	10:40.09
10,000 m walk	Anastasiya Yatsevich; Brest Region	46:53.12	Nadzeya Darazhuk; Grodno Region	47:12.53	Anastasiya Rodz'kina; Mogilev Region	47:27.39
High jump	Taisiya Roslava; Vitebsk Region/Mogilev Region	1.85 m	Ganna Garodskaya; Mogilev Region	1.85 m	Yana Maksimava; Vitebsk Region	1.85 m
Pole vault	Iryna Yakaltsevich; Grodno Region	4.30 m	Ganna Shpak; Minsk/Mogilev Region	4.20 m	Alina Vishneuskaya; Minsk	4.20 m
Long jump	Nastassya Mironchyk-Ivanova; Minsk Region	6.71 m	Veranika Shutkova; Minsk	6.38 m	Viyaleta Skvartsova; Vitebsk Region	6.11 m
Triple jump	Iryna Vaskouskaya; Minsk Region	14.23 m	Aksinnya Dzetsyuk; Gomel Region	13.90 m	Natallya Vyatkina; Grodno Region/Gomel Region	13.72 m
Shot put	Yuliya Leantsyuk; Brest Region	18.24 m	Alena Dubitskaya; Grodno Region	18.19 m	Alena Abramchuk; Brest Region	17.50 m
4 × 400 m relay	Viktoryya Shymanskaya; Alesya Dabravitskaya; Alena Kievich; Katsyaryna Belanovich; Brest Region	3:41.98	Alyaksandra Khilmanovich; Viktoryya Kushnir; Katsyaryna Verameenka; Yuliya Karol; Grodno Region	3:42.47	Yuliya Petranevich; Katsyaryna Kharashkevich; Anastasiya Aksenava; Krystsina Radzivanyuk; Minsk	3:52.24
