= 2020 Belarusian Athletics Championships =

- Dates: 30 July – 2 August
- Host city: Minsk
- Venue: Dinamo Stadium
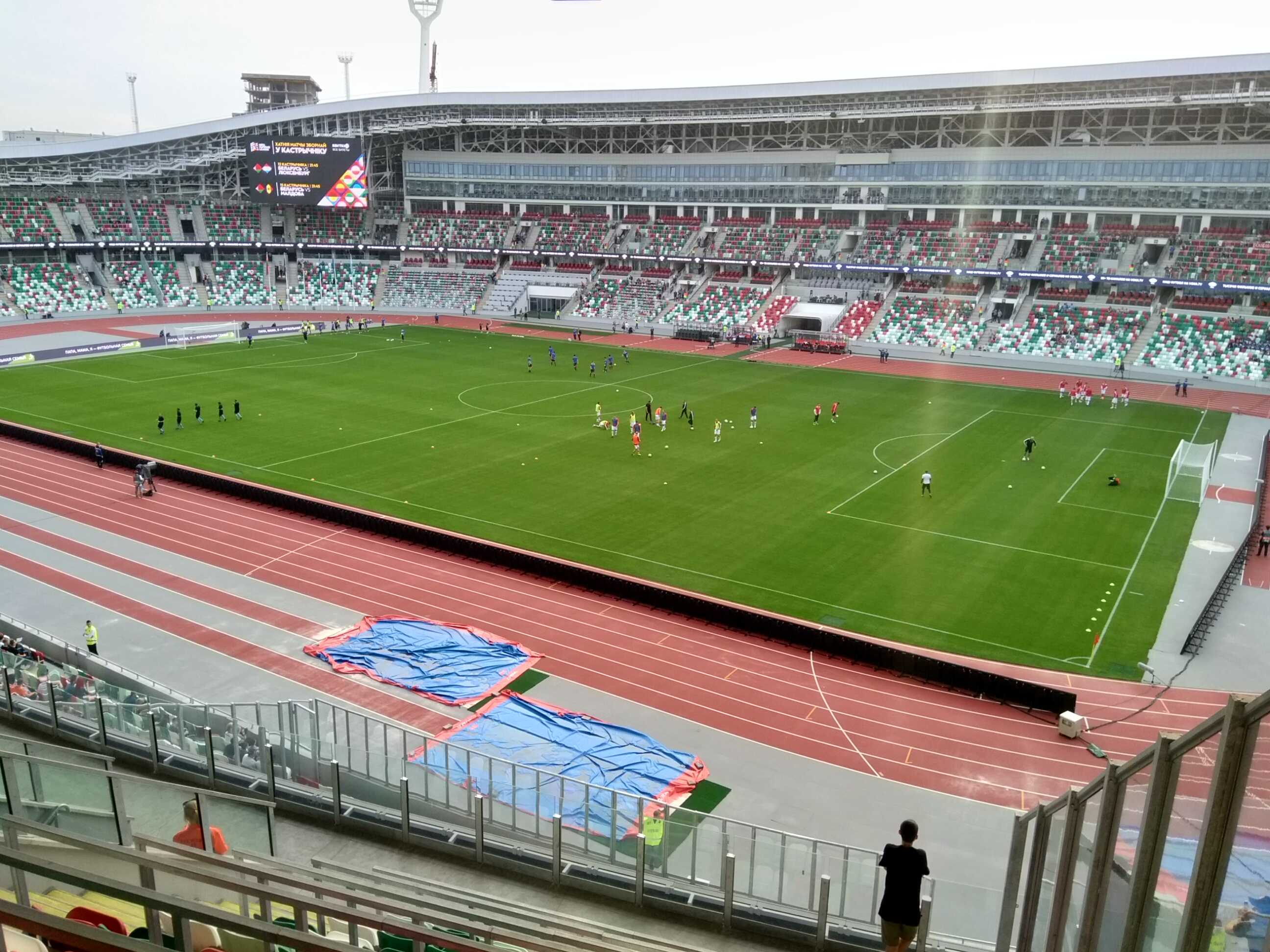
- Events: 40

The 2020 Belarusian Athletics Championships (Belarusian: Чэмпіянат Беларусі па лёгкай атлетыцы 2020) was the national championship in outdoor track and field for Belarus. It was held from 30 July – 2 August at Dinamo Stadium in Minsk.

== Results ==
=== Men ===
Event	Gold		Silver		Bronze	
100 metres	Yuriy Zabolotnyy	10.32 s	Maksim Hrabarenka	10.69 s	Denis Bliznets	10.76 s
200 metres	Sergey Pustobayev	21.58 s	Maksim Bohdan	21.63 s	Maksim Hrabarenka	21.69 s
400 metres	Aliaksandr Vasileuskiy	46.40 s	Ihar Zubko	47.09 s	Aliaksei Lazarau	47.46 s
800 metres	Ilya Karnaukhov	1:48.79 min	Sergey Karpov	1:49.58 min	Jan Słoma	1:49.70 min
1500 metres	Ilya Karnaukhov	3:44.06 min	Siarhei Platonau	3:44.78 min	Artsiom Kalachou	3:45.25 min
5000 metres	Viachaslau Skudny	14:09.01 min	Siarhei Krauchenia	14:14.27 min	Sergey Platonau	14:22.43 min
10,000 metres	Siarhei Krauchenia	29:20.86 min	Stepan Rogovtsev	29:24.21 min	Uladzislau Pramau	29:46.76 min
110 m hurdles	Vitali Parakhonka	13.72 s	Viktar Sinkavets	14.37 s	Ivan Khodatovich	14.45 s
400 m hurdles	Yahor Khauratovich	51.59 s	Kiryl Borys	51.68 s	Siarhei Siarkou	52.69 s
3000 m s'chase	Viachaslau Skudny	8:42.98 min	Dzmitry Ivanenka	8:47.78 min	Uladzislau Pitin	9:00.13 min
10,000 m walk	Aliaksandr Liakhovich	39:41.07 min	Mikita Kaliada	40:18.51 min	Anatoliy Gomelev	40:32.18 min
4 × 100 m relay	National team Denis Bliznets; Maksim Bogdan; Yuriy Zabolotnyy; Maksim Hrabarenka	40.00 s	Gomel; Ivan Trofimovich; Stepan Chishankov; Maksat Ashirov; Paul Dyrda	42.36 s	Minsk; Kirill Starovoitov; Nikita Mikheiko; Kirill Mitko; Anton Pushkarev	42.54 s
High jump	Maksim Nedasekau	2.30 m	Ruslan Karatkevich	2.15 m	Yehor Hyptor	2.15 m
Pole vault	Uladzislau Chemormazovich	5.20 m	Dmitry Marfushkin	5.00 m	Aliaksandr Hramyka	4.80 m
Long jump	Uladzislau Bulakhau	8.10 m	Artsiom Huryn	7.83 m	Mikita Lapatsenka	7.67 m
Triple jump	Maksim Niastsiarenka	16.27 m	Yahor Chiuko	15.89 m	Artsem Bandarenka	15.36 m
Discus throw	Viktar Trus	56.71 m	Uladsislau Puchko	56.56 m	Yauheni Bahutski	55.95 m
Hammer throw	Pavel Bareisha	76.23 m	Nikolay Bashan	75.00 m	Yury Vasilchanka	71.82 m
Javelin throw	Aliaksei Katkavets	86.05 m	Valery Izotau	75.88 m	Pavel Mialeshka	71.64 m
Decathlon	Vital Zhuk	8202 pts	Maksim Andraloits	8100 pts	Eduard Mikhan	7829 pts

=== Women ===
Event	Gold		Silver		Bronze	
100 metres	Krystsina Tsimanouskaya	11.51 s	Katsyarina Zhyvayeva	11.84 s	Viktoryia Zakharchuk	12.05 s
200 metres	Krystsina Tsimanouskaya	23.44 s	Elvira Herman	23.62 s	Alina Luchsava	23.86 s
400 metres	Alina Luchsava	52.15 s	Krystsina Muliarchyk	53.27 s	Katsiaryna Harashkevich	53.76 s
800 metres	Daryia Barysevich	2:04.15 min	Ilona Ivanova	2:05.26 min	Anastasiya Katseika	2:06.36 min
1500 metres	Daryia Barysevich	4:28.45 min	Ilona Ivanova	4:29.96 min	Viktoriya Kushnir	4:32.23 min
5000 metres	Katsiaryna Karneyenka	15:51.39 min	Sviatlana Kudzelich	15:54.13 min	Nina Savina	15:57.28 min
10,000 metres	Nina Savina	33:17.53 min	Sviatlana Kudzelich	33:20.00 min	Katsiaryna Karneyenka	33:26.39 min
100 m hurdles	Elvira Herman	12.87 s	Sviatlana Parakhonko	13.25 s	Ruslana Rashkovan	13.43 s
400 m hurdles	Anna Mikhaylova	57.75 s	Aliaksandra Khilmanovich	58.53 s	Valiantsina Chymbar	59.96 s
3000 m s'chase	Tatsiana Shabanava	10:19.76 min	Tatyana Smirnova	11:17.20 min	Anna Krotova	11:23.65 min
10,000 m walk	Anna Terlyukevich	44:43.31 min	Darya Paluektava	45:21.21 min	Anastasiya Rarovkaya	45:50.50 min
4 × 100 m relay	Minsk; Victoria Khorovitskaya; Asteria Limay; Ekaterina Kharashkevich; Julia Kuritsyna	48.07 s	Minsk; Julia Graborenko; Anna Lavrova; Yanina Lutsenko; Tatiana Denko	48.24 s	Hrodna; Daria Nester; Valentina Chimbor; Alexandra Khilmanovich; Polina Kibereva	48.74 s
High jump	Mariya Zhodzik	1.83 m	Hanna Haradskaya Yelizaveta Simanovich	1.75 m	Not awarded	
Pole vault	Iryna Zhuk	4.72 m	Krystsina Kantsavenka	4.40 m	Anna Shpak	4.00 m
Long jump	Nastassia Mironchyk-Ivanova	6.81 m	Viyaleta Skvartsova	6.29 m	Palina Zlotnikava	6.04 m
Triple jump	Iryna Vaskouskaya	14.24 m	Viyaleta Skvartsova	14.16 m	Alexandra Malofeeva	13.16 m
Discus throw	Sviatlana Siarova	52.60 m	Alena Siaredzich	52.59 m	Alena Abramchuk	51.42 m
Hammer throw	Alena Sobaleva	69.61 m	Hanna Malyshchyk	68.92 m	Nastassia Maslava	67.22 m
Javelin throw	Tatsiana Khaladovich	66.85 m	Viktoriya Yarmakova	57.67 m	Karyna Butkevich	54.72 m
Heptathlon	Dziyana Rabkova	5937 pts	Yuliya Rout	5707 pts	Sharlota Paehlitse	5427 pts

=== Mixed ===
Event	Gold		Silver		Bronze	
4 × 400 m relay	National Team 1 Alina Luchsheva; Christina Mulyarchik; Aliaksandr Vasileuskiy; Ihar Subko	3:20.14 min	National Team 2 Julia Bliznets; Ekaterina Kharashkevich; Kirill Starovoitov; Aleksey Lazarev	3:22.12 min	Hrodna; Aleksandra Khilmanovich; Valentina Chimbor; Sergey Pustobayev; Yan Sloma	3:26.67 min
