= Minsk Half Marathon =

Annual running competition

- Date: September
- Location: Minsk
- Event type: Road
- Distance: Half marathon
- Primary sponsor: Belaruskali
- Established: 2013
- Course records: Men's: 1:02:39 (2018) (Ethiopia) Abebe Negewo; Women's: 1:11:24 (2019) (Belarus) Nina Savina
- Website: Minsk Half Marathon
- Participants: 1,211 finishers (2021); 4,120 (2019)

Minsk Half Marathon is an annual road running event over the half marathon distance which is held in September on the streets of Minsk, Belarus. The competition comprises three main parts: a 21.0975 km half marathon race, a 10,55 km race, and a 5,5 km race.

In 2015 the running event was organized with financial support from Volkswagen Polo. It was called 'Minsk Polo Marathon'. In 2015 the number of participants reached 16 099 people from 36 countries.

== List of winners ==
Key: Course record

Year	Men's winner	Time (h:m:s)	Women's winner	Time (h:m:s)
2014	Ilya Slavinski (BLR)	1:06:27	Maryna Damantsevich (BLR)	1:13:33
2015	Vitaliy Shafar (UKR)	1:04:38	Volha Mazuronak (BLR)	1:12:02
2016	Hillary Maiyo (KEN)	1:03:00	Volha Mazuronak (BLR)	1:11:44
2017	Hillary Maiyo (KEN)	1:03:18	Lyudmyla Kovalenko (BLR)	1:13:53
2018	Abebe Negewo (ETH)	1:02:39	Sheila Jerotich (KEN)	1:12:05
2019	Afewerki Berhane (ERI)	1:04:08	Nina Savina (BLR)	1:11:24
2021	Vitaliy Shafar (UKR)	1:04:15	Nina Savina (BLR)	1:14:37
2022	Rinas Akhmadeev (RUS)	1:02:50	Maryna Damantsevich (BLR)	1:16:11
2023	Rinas Akhmadeev (RUS)	1:03:20	Maryna Damantsevich (BLR)	1:15:15
