= Hanchar =

Hanchar (Belarusian: Ганчар), sometimes transliterated Ganchar, is a Belarusian-language occupational surname, literally meaning "potter". Notable people with the surname include:

- Katsiaryna Hanchar (born 1988), Belarusian sprinter
- Perry Ganchar (born 1963), Canadian ice hockey player
- Viktar Hanchar (born 1957), Belarusian politician
