= Athletics at the 2020 Summer Olympics – Women's 4 × 400 metres relay =

Women's 4 × 400 metres relay at the Games of the XXXII Olympiad
- Venue: Japan National Stadium; Tokyo, Japan
- Dates: 5 August 2021 (round 1); 7 August 2021 (final)
- Competitors: 73 from 16 nations
- Winning time: 3:16.85 min

Medalists
1st place, gold medalist(s)		Sydney McLaughlin; Allyson Felix; Dalilah Muhammad; Athing Mu; Kaylin Whitney (Note: Indicates the athlete only competed in the preliminary heats.); Wadeline Jonathas; Kendall Ellis; Lynna Irby	United States
2nd place, silver medalist(s)		Natalia Kaczmarek; Iga Baumgart-Witan; Małgorzata Hołub-Kowalik; Justyna Święty-Ersetic; Anna Kiełbasińska	Poland
3rd place, bronze medalist(s)		Roneisha McGregor; Janieve Russell; Shericka Jackson; Candice McLeod; Junelle Bromfield; Stacey-Ann Williams	Jamaica

The women's 4 × 400 metres relay at the 2020 Summer Olympics was held over two rounds at the Japan National Stadium in Tokyo, Japan, on 5 and 7 August 2021. There were 16 competing relay teams, with each team having at least 5 members from which 4 were selected in each round.

== Background ==
This was the 13th appearance of the event, having appeared at every Olympics since 1972.

The event continued to use the two-round format introduced in 2012.

Prior to this competition, the existing world, Olympic, and area records were as follows.

World record	Tatyana Ledovskaya, Olga Nazarova, Mariya Pinigina, Olga Bryzgina (URS)	3:15.17	Seoul, South Korea	1 October 1988
Olympic record	Tatyana Ledovskaya, Olga Nazarova, Mariya Pinigina, Olga Bryzgina (URS)	3:15.17	Seoul, South Korea	1 October 1988

Area records before the 2020 Summer Olympics
Area	Time (s)	Athlete	Nation
Africa (records)	3:21.04	Olabisi Afolabi; Fatima Yusuf; Charity Opara; Falilat Ogunkoya	Nigeria
Asia (records)	3:24.28	An Xiaohong; Bai Xiaoyun; Cao Chunying; Ma Yuqin	China
Europe (records)	3:15.17 WR	Tatyana Ledovskaya; Olga Nazarova; Mariya Pinigina; Olga Bryzgina	Soviet Union
North, Central America and Caribbean (records)	3:15.51	Denean Howard; Diane Dixon; Valerie Brisco-Hooks; Florence Griffith Joyner	United States
Oceania (records)	3:23.81	Nova Peris-Kneebone; Tamsyn Manou; Melinda Gainsford-Taylor; Cathy Freeman	Australia
South America (records)	3:26.68	Geisa Aparecida Coutinho; Bárbara de Oliveira; Joelma Sousa; Jailma de Lima	Brazil

== Qualification ==
A National Olympic Committee (NOC) could qualify a relay team of 5 athletes in one of three ways. A total of 16 NOCs qualified.

- The top 8 NOCs at the 2019 World Athletics Championships qualified a relay team.
- The top 8 NOCs at the 2021 World Athletics Relays qualified a relay team.
- Where an NOC placed in the top 8 at both the 2019 World Championships and the 2021 World Relays, the quota place was allocated to the world ranking list as of 29 June 2021. In this case, 4 teams did so, so there are 4 places available through the world rankings.

The qualifying period was originally from 1 May 2019 to 29 June 2020. Due to the COVID-19 pandemic, the period was suspended from 6 April 2020 to 30 November 2020, with the end date extended to 29 June 2021. The qualifying time standards could be obtained in various meets during the given period that have the approval of the IAAF. Both indoor and outdoor meets are eligible. The most recent Area Championships may be counted in the ranking, even if not during the qualifying period.

== Results ==
=== Round 1 ===
Round 1 was held on 5 August 2021, starting at 19:00 (UTC+9).

Qualification Rules: First 3 in each heat (Q) and the next 2 fastest (q) advance to the Final

Results of the first heat of round 1
Rank	Lane	Nation	Competitors	Reaction	Time	Notes
1	3	Poland	Anna Kiełbasińska, Iga Baumgart-Witan, Małgorzata Hołub-Kowalik, Justyna Święty-Ersetic	0.161	3:23.10	Q, SB
2	8	Cuba	Zurian Hechavarría, Rose Mary Almanza, Sahily Diago, Lisneidy Veitía	0.194	3:24.04	Q, SB
3	4	Belgium	Naomi Van den Broeck, Imke Vervaet, Paulien Couckuyt, Camille Laus	0.139	3:24.08	Q, NR
4	5	Germany	Corinna Schwab, Carolina Krafzik, Laura Müller, Ruth Spelmeyer	0.168	3:24.77	SB
5	9	France	Sokhna Lacoste, Amandine Brossier, Brigitte Ntiamoah, Floria Gueï	0.279	3:25.07	SB
6	6	Switzerland	Léa Sprunger, Silke Lemmens, Rachel Pellaud, Yasmin Giger	0.153	3:25.90	NR
7	7	Australia	Bendere Oboya, Kendra Hubbard, Ellie Beer, Anneliese Rubie-Renshaw	0.197	3:30.61	SB
	2	Bahamas	Doneisha Anderson, Megan Moss, Brianne Bethel, Anthonique Strachan	0.297	DNF	

Results of the second heat of round 1
Rank	Lane	Nation	Competitors	Reaction	Time	Notes
1	8	United States	Kaylin Whitney, Wadeline Jonathas, Kendall Ellis, Lynna Irby	0.177	3:20.86	Q, SB
2	9	Jamaica	Junelle Bromfield, Roneisha McGregor, Janieve Russell, Stacey-Ann Williams	0.177	3:21.95	Q, SB
3	3	Great Britain	Emily Diamond, Zoey Clark, Laviai Nielsen, Nicole Yeargin	0.169	3:23.99	Q, SB
4	7	Netherlands	Lieke Klaver, Lisanne de Witte, Laura de Witte, Femke Bol	0.220	3:24.01	q, NR
5	6	Canada	Alicia Brown, Sage Watson, Madeline Price, Kyra Constantine	0.162	3:24.05	q, SB
6	5	Ukraine	Kateryna Klymiuk, Alina Lohvynenko, Viktoriya Tkachuk, Anna Ryzhykova	0.173	3:24.50	SB
7	4	Italy	Maria Benedicta Chigbolu, Alice Mangione, Petra Nardelli, Rebecca Borga	0.150	3:27.74	SB
8	2	Belarus	Aliaksandra Khilmanovich, Yuliya Bliznets, Elvira Herman, Asteria Limai	0.214	3:33.00	

=== Final ===
The final was held on 7 August 2021 at 21:30 (UTC+9).

This was USA's seventh consecutive Olympic gold, their 3:16.85 the fifth fastest time in history. Poland's 3:20.53 became their new National record. For Felix, it became her eleventh and final Olympic medal.

Results of the final
Rank	Lane	Nation	Competitors	Reaction	Time	Notes
1st place, gold medalist(s)	7	United States	Sydney McLaughlin, Allyson Felix, Dalilah Muhammad, Athing Mu	0.145	3:16.85	SB
2nd place, silver medalist(s)	4	Poland	Natalia Kaczmarek, Iga Baumgart-Witan, Małgorzata Hołub-Kowalik, Justyna Święty-Ersetic	0.183	3:20.53	NR
3rd place, bronze medalist(s)	5	Jamaica	Roneisha McGregor, Janieve Russell, Shericka Jackson, Candice McLeod	0.192	3:21.24	SB
4	3	Canada	Alicia Brown, Madeline Price, Kyra Constantine, Sage Watson	0.179	3:21.84	SB
5	9	Great Britain	Ama Pipi, Jodie Williams, Emily Diamond, Nicole Yeargin	0.163	3:22.59	SB
6	2	Netherlands	Lieke Klaver, Lisanne de Witte, Laura de Witte, Femke Bol	0.207	3:23.74	NR
7	8	Belgium	Naomi Van den Broeck, Imke Vervaet, Paulien Couckuyt, Camille Laus	0.173	3:23.96	NR
8	6	Cuba	Zurian Hechavarría, Rose Mary Almanza, Sahily Diago, Lisneidy Veitía	0.219	3:26.92	
