= Tuğba Danışmaz =

Turkish track and field athlete (born 1999)

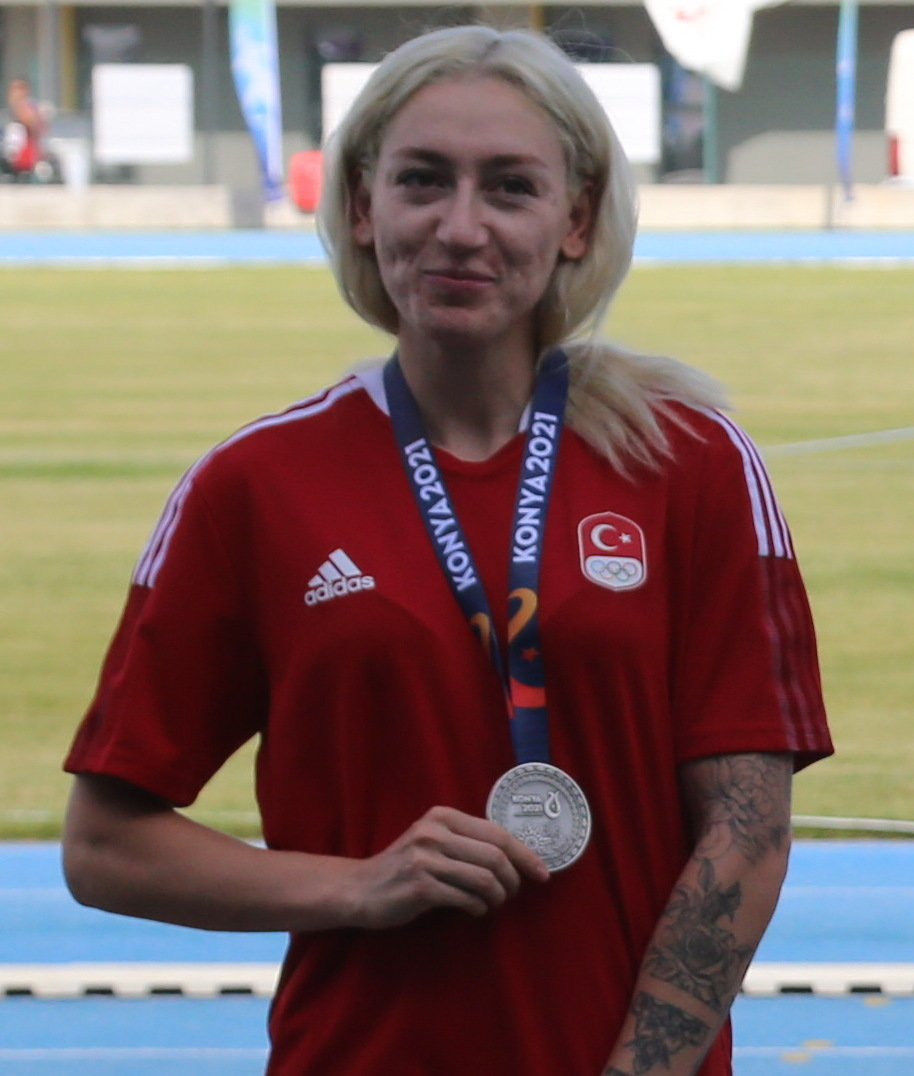
- Danışmaz at Konya 2021

Personal information
- Nationality: Turkish
- Born: 1 September 1999 (age 27) Ankara, Turkey

Sport
- Country: Turkey
- Sport: Athletics
- Events: Long jump, triple jump
- Club: Enka SK
Medal record
Women's athletics
Representing Turkey
European Championships
Silver medal – second place	2024 Rome	Triple jump
European Indoor Championships
Gold medal – first place	2023 Istanbul	Triple jump
European Games
Silver medal – second place	2023 Kraków-Małopolska	Triple jump
European Team Championships
Bronze medal – third place	2025 Maribor	Triple jump
Mediterranean Games
Silver medal – second place	2022 Oran	Triple jump
Islamic Solidarity Games
Silver medal – second place	2021 Konya	Long jump
Bronze medal – third place	2021 Konya	Triple jump
Summer World University Games
Gold medal – first place	2021 Chengdu	Triple jump
European U23 Championships
Gold medal – first place	2021 Tallinn	Triple jump
Silver medal – second place	2019 Gävle	Triple jump

Tuğba Danışmaz (born 1 September 1999) is a Turkish track and field athlete competing in the long jump and triple jump. She won the gold medal for the triple jump at the 2023 European Indoor Championships. She claimed silver and gold at the 2019 and 2021 European Under-23 Championships respectively.

Danışmaz is the Turkish national record holder for the triple jump, both outdoors and indoors.

== Sports career ==
Danışmaz competes for Enka SK in Istanbul.

She participated at the 2018 Balkan Athletics U20 Championships in Istanbul, Turkey, and placed fifth in the triple jump event.

Danışmaz competed in the long jump and triple jump events at the 2019 Turkish Athletics Super League's first leg in Bursa, and broke the 12-year old triple jump national under-23 record with 13.80 metres. She won the silver medal in the triple jump event at the 2019 European Athletics U23 Championships held in Gävle, Sweden, improving her own Turkish U23 record.

She won the bronze medal in the triple jump event with 14.00 m at the 2025 European Athletics Team Championships Second Division in Maribor, Slovenia, and contributed to her team's record with 14 points.

Danışmaz advanced to the final with 14.23 metres in the qualifying round at 2026 European Athletics Championships and in the final, she finished fifth with 14.33 m.

== Achievements ==
=== International competitions ===
Representing Turkey
Year	Competition	Venue	Position	Event	Time	Notes
2018	Balkan U20 Championships	Istanbul, Turkey	5th	Triple jump	12.75 m	
2019	European U23 Championships	Gävle, Sweden	2nd	Triple jump	13.85 m	NU23R
2021	Balkan Indoor Championships	Istanbul, Turkey	1st	Triple jump	13.97 m	
2021	European U23 Championships	Tallinn, Estonia	1st	Triple jump	14.09 m	NR
2022	Balkan Indoor Championships	Istanbul, Turkey	1st	Triple jump	14.14 m	
2023	European Indoor Championships	Istanbul, Turkey	1st	Triple jump	14.31 m	NR
2023	Summer World University Games	Chengdu, China	1st	Triple jump	14.31 m	ER
2024	European Championships	Rome, Italy	2nd	Triple jump	14.57 m	NR
2024	Olympic Games	Paris, France	16th (q)	Triple jump	13.97 m	
2025	European Indoor Championships	Apeldoorn, Netherlands	5th	Triple jump	13.79 m	
2025	European Team Championships 2nd Division	Maribor, Slovenia	3rd	Triple jump	14.00 m	
2025	World Championships	Tokyo, Japan	12th	Triple jump	13.43 m	
2026	European Championships	Birmingham, United Kingdom	5th	Triple jump	14.33 m	
2026	Mediterranean Games	Taranto, Italy	10th	Long jump	5.96 m	
2026	Mediterranean Games	Taranto, Italy	5th	Triple jump	13.47 m	

=== Personal bests ===
- Long jump – 6.51 (Bursa 2022)
  - Long jump indoor – 6.32 (Istanbul 2022)
- Triple jump – 14.57 (Rome 2024) NR
  - Triple jump indoor – 14.31 (Istanbul 2023) NR

=== National titles ===
- Turkish Athletics Championships
  - Long jump: 2021, 2022
  - Triple jump: 2019, 2020, 2021, 2022
- Turkish Indoor Athletics Championships
  - Long jump: 2020
  - Triple jump: 2022
