= Spyridoula Karydi =

Greek triple jumper (born 2001)

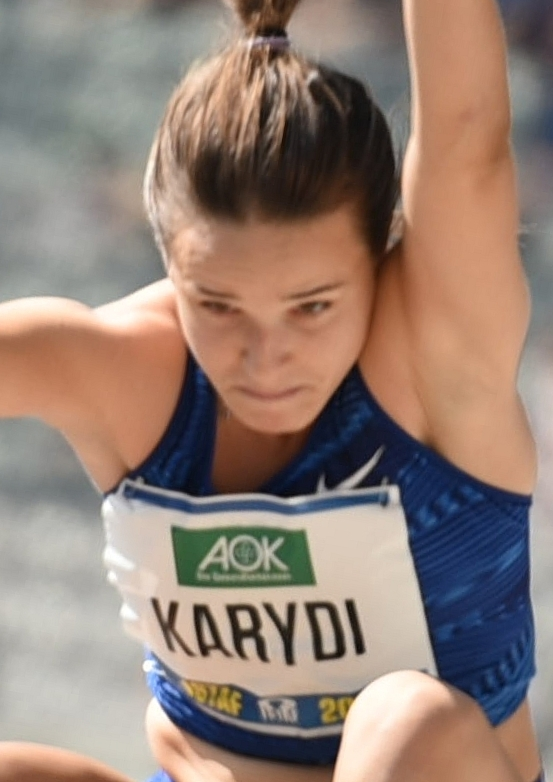

Personal information
- Nationality: Greek
- Born: 30 January 2001 (age 25) Athens, Greece
- Height: 1.63
- Weight: 54

Sport
- Country: Greece
- Sport: Athletics
- Events: Triple jump, Long jump
- Coached by: Georgi Pomashki

Achievements and titles
- Personal bests: 14.19m (2021); 13.72m (i) (2021); 6.71m (2020)
Medal record
Women's athletics
Representing Greece

Spyridoula Karydi (Greek: Σπυριδούλα Καρύδη; born 30 January 2001) is a Greek triple jumper. She represented Greece at the 2022 European Athletics Championships in Munich, taking the 9th place in the final.

== Competition record ==
Representing Greece
| Year | Competition | Venue | Position | Notes | |
|---|---|---|---|---|---|
| 2018 | European U18 Championships | Győr, Hungary | 3rd | long jump | 6.23 m NYB |
| 2018 | Summer Youth Olympics | Buenos Aires, Argentina | 6th | Triple jump | 12.84 m |
| 2019 | European U20 Championships | Borås, Sweden | 1st | Triple jump | 14.00m NU20R |
| 2021 | European Indoor Championships | Toruń, Poland | 11th (q) | Triple jump | 13.69 m |
| 2021 | European Team Championships | Cluj-Napoca, Romania | 3rd | Triple jump | 14.13 m |
| 2021 | Balkan Championships | Smederevo, Serbia | 2nd | Triple jump | 14.12 m |
| 2021 | European U23 Championships | Tallinn, Estonia | 2nd | Triple jump | 13.95 m |
| 2021 | European U23 Championships | Tallinn, Estonia | 9th | long jump | 6.25 m |
| 2022 | European Championships | Munich, Germany | 9th | Triple jump | 13.54 m |
| 2022 | World Championships | Eugene, United States | 24th (q) | Triple jump | 13.62 m |
| 2023 | European Indoor Championships | Istanbul, Turkey | 10th (q) | Triple jump | 13.60 m SB |
| 2026 | European Championships | Birmingham, United Kingdom | 13th (q) | Triple jump | 14.03 m |
