= 2021 European Athletics U23 Championships – Women's triple jump =

Women's triple jump at the 2021 European Athletics U23 Championships
- Venue: Kadriorg Stadium, Tallinn
- Dates: 8–9 July
- Competitors: 29 from 19 nations
- Winning distance: 14.09

Medalists
gold medal	Tuğba Danışmaz	Turkey
silver medal	Spyridoula Karydi	Greece
bronze medal	Rūta Kate Lasmane	Latvia

The women's triple jump event at the 2021 European Athletics U23 Championships was held in Tallinn, Estonia, at Kadriorg Stadium on 8 and 9 July.

== Records ==
Prior to the competition, the records were as follows:

European U23 record	Anna Pyatykh (RUS)	14.79	Florence, Italy	21 June 2003
Championship U23 record	Cristina Nicolau (ROU)	14.70	Gothenburg, Sweden	1 August 1999

== Results ==
=== Qualification ===
Qualification rule: 13.60 (Q) or the 12 best results (q) qualified for the final.

Rank	Group	Name	Nationality	#1	#2	#3	Results	Notes
1	B	Spyridoula Karydi	Greece	x	14.04		14.04	Q
2	B	Tuğba Danışmaz	Turkey	x	13.76		13.76	Q
3	A	Caroline Joyeux	Germany	13.16	13.63		13.63	Q, PB
4	A	Rūta Kate Lasmane	Latvia	13.57	x	r	13.57	q
5	B	Eva Pepelnak	Slovenia	x	13.03	13.43	13.43	q
6	A	Lucrezia Sartori	Italy	13.35	12.87	12.91	13.35	q, PB
7	B	Linda Suchá	Czech Republic	x	13.28	x	13.28	q, SB
8	A	Victoria Josse	France	12.98	13.01	13.22	13.22	q
9	B	Kira Wittmann	Germany	12.95	13.19	13.15	13.19	q
10	B	Natalia Mach	Poland	x	x	13.19	13.19	q
11	A	Emma Maštalířová	Czech Republic	13.18	13.12	13.11	13.18	q
12	A	Diana Ana Maria Ion	Romania	12.75	13.14	13.15	13.15	q
13	A	Ella Nisula	Finland	13.01	13.10	12.86	13.10	PB
14	A	Imke Daalmann	Germany	13.08	x	x	13.08	
15	B	Georgiana Iuliana Anitei	Romania	x	12.80	12.99	12.99	SB
16	B	Anastasiya Kolotiy	Ukraine	12.70	12.75	12.98	12.98	
17	B	Oleksandra Levchenko	Ukraine	12.98	12.72	12.24	12.98	
18	B	Fatima Koné	Sweden	12.25	x	12.98	12.98	
19	B	Ariana Kuzmanova	Bulgaria	x	12.96	x	12.96	
20	A	Eliise Anijalg	Estonia	12.94	12.50	12.62	12.94	
21	A	Vaida Padimanskaitė	Lithuania	12.73	12.88	12.80	12.88	
22	A	Neja Omanović	Slovenia	12.76	12.67	12.87	12.87	SB
23	A	Esra Yılmaz	Turkey	12.59	12.59	12.83	12.83	
24	B	Veronica Zanon	Italy	x	12.82	12.78	12.82	
25	B	Gizem Akgöz	Turkey	12.80	12.55	12.72	12.80	
26	A	Yana Sargsyan	Armenia	12.75	x	12.37	12.75	
27	A	Viktória Áts	Hungary	12.63	12.73	x	12.73	
28	A	Diana Kravchenko	Ukraine	12.63	12.55	12.56	12.63	
29	B	Claire Azzopardi	Malta	11.69	x	12.31	12.31	

=== Final ===
Rank	Name	Nationality	#1	#2	#3	#4	#5	#6	Result	Notes
1st place, gold medalist(s)	Tuğba Danışmaz	Turkey	x	13.13	14.09	x	x	x	14.09	NR
2nd place, silver medalist(s)	Spyridoula Karydi	Greece	13.47	x	13.45	13.95	13.41	13.82	13.95	
3rd place, bronze medalist(s)	Rūta Kate Lasmane	Latvia	13.75	13.54	x	x	x	13.27	13.75	
4	Eva Pepelnak	Slovenia	13.36	13.69	13.04	13.13	12.87	13.26	13.69	SB
5	Caroline Joyeux	Germany	13.22	13.05	13.16	13.36	13.07	13.24	13.36	
6	Diana Ana Maria Ion	Romania	13.00	12.97	13.19	13.22	13.03	13.27	13.27	
7	Kira Wittmann	Germany	13.00	13.01	13.13	13.19	x	11.29	13.19	
8	Natalia Mach	Poland	x	12.70	13.15	x	x	x	13.15	
9	Victoria Josse	France	13.13	12.67	x				13.13	
10	Lucrezia Sartori	Italy	x	12.83	12.24				12.83	
	Emma Maštalířová	Czech Republic	DNS							
	Linda Suchá	Czech Republic	DNS							
