= 2018 European Athletics Championships – Women's marathon =

Women's marathon at the 2018 European Athletics Championships
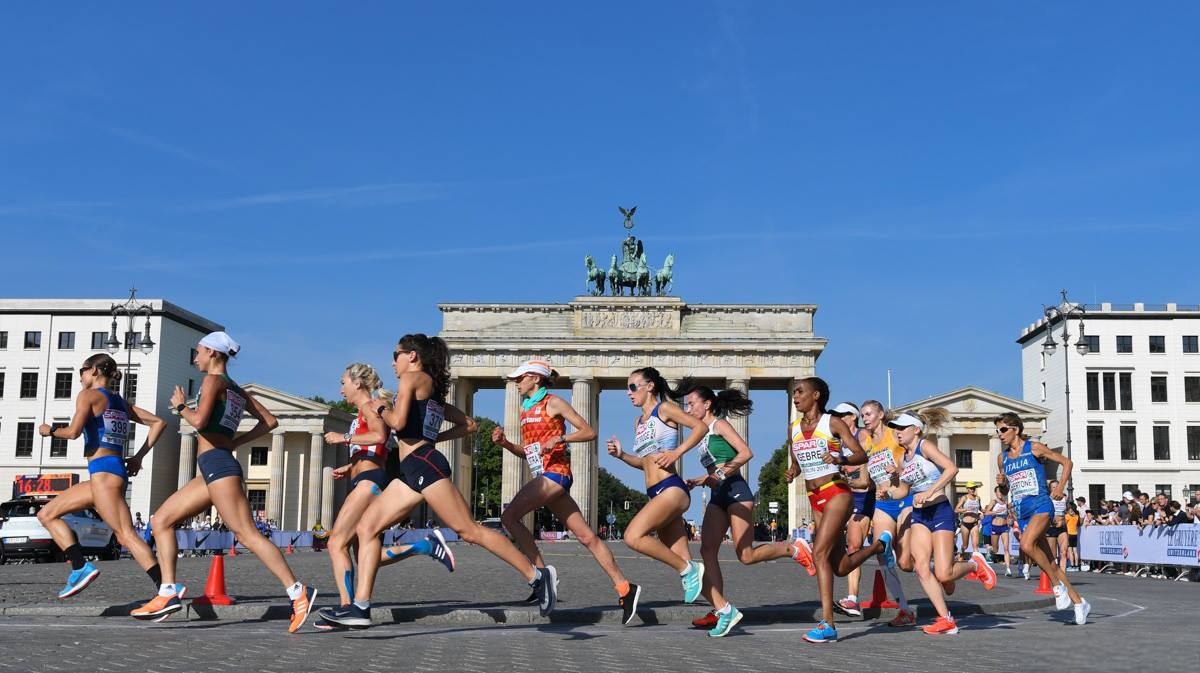
- Location: Berlin
- Dates: 12 August 2018
- Competitors: 56 from 20 nations
- Winning time: 2:26.22

Medalists
gold medal	Volha Mazuronak	Belarus
silver medal	Clémence Calvin	France
bronze medal	Eva Vrabcová-Nývltová	Czech Republic

The women's marathon at the 2018 European Athletics Championships took place in the inner districts of Berlin on 12 August.

== Records ==
World record	Paula Radcliffe (GBR)	2:15:25	London, Great Britain	13 April 2003
European record	Paula Radcliffe (GBR)	2:15:25	London, Great Britain	13 April 2003
Championship record	Christelle Daunay (FRA)	2:25:14	Zürich, Switzerland	16 August 2014
World Leading	Vivian Cheruiyot (KEN)	2:18:31	London, Great Britain	22 April 2018
European Leading	Volha Mazuronak (BLR)	2:25:25	Düsseldorf, Germany	29 April 2018

== Schedule ==
Date	Time	Round
12 August 2018	9:05	Final

All times are local times (UTC+2)

== Results ==
46 athletes finished the race.

Rank	Name	Nationality	Time	Note
1st place, gold medalist(s)	Volha Mazuronak	Belarus	2:26:22	
2nd place, silver medalist(s)	Clémence Calvin	France	2:26:28	
3rd place, bronze medalist(s)	Eva Vrabcová-Nývltová	Czech Republic	2:26:31	NR
4	Maryna Damantsevich	Belarus	2:27:44	PB
5	Nastassia Ivanova	Belarus	2:27:49	SB
6	Sara Dossena	Italy	2:27:53	PB
7	Martina Strähl	Switzerland	2:28:07	PB
8	Catherine Bertone	Italy	2:30:06	
9	Trihas Gebre	Spain	2:32:13	PB
10	Izabela Trzaskalska	Poland	2:33:43	
11	Fabienne Amrhein	Germany	2:33:44	
12	Nina Savina	Belarus	2:33:50	PB
13	Azucena Díaz	Spain	2:34:00	
14	Fatna Maraoui	Italy	2:34:48	
15	Tracy Barlow	Great Britain	2:35:00	
16	Katharina Heinig	Germany	2:35:00	
17	Mikaela Larsson	Sweden	2:35:06	PB
18	Ruth van der Meijden	Netherlands	2:35:44	
19	Olha Kotovska	Ukraine	2:35:56	
20	Bojana Bjeljac	Croatia	2:37:31	PB
21	Sonia Samuels	Great Britain	2:37:36	
22	Hanna Lindholm	Sweden	2:37:44	
23	Elena Loyo	Spain	2:37:54	
24	Marta Galimany	Spain	2:38:25	
25	Darya Mykhaylova	Ukraine	2:38:30	SB
26	Gloria Privilétzio	Greece	2:38:39	PB
27	Milda Eimonte	Lithuania	2:38:58	
28	Laura Hrebec	Switzerland	2:39:03	PB
29	Lizzie Lee	Ireland	2:40:12	
30	Caryl Jones	Great Britain	2:40:41	SB
31	Breege Connolly	Ireland	2:41:53	
32	Malin Starfelt	Sweden	2:42:32	
33	Gladys Ganiel O'Neill	Ireland	2:42:42	
34	Nikolina Šustić	Croatia	2:42:44	PB
35	Tubay Erdal	Turkey	2:43:10	
36	Ourania Rebouli	Greece	2:44:32	
37	Ümmü Kiraz	Turkey	2:45:28	
38	Vira Ovcharuk	Ukraine	2:46:45	SB
39	Karoline Moen Guidon	Switzerland	2:46:56	
40	Fanni Gyurkó	Hungary	2:47:20	
41	Nikolina Stepan	Croatia	2:47:55	
42	Paula Todoran	Romania	2:47:58	
43	Vaida Žūsinaitė	Lithuania	2:50:49	
44	Elif Dagdelen	Turkey	2:50:59	
45	Matea Matošević	Croatia	2:56:29	
46	Laura Gotti	Italy	3:34:13	
	Iryna Somava	Belarus	DNF	
	Viktoriya Khapilina	Ukraine	DNF	
	Clara Simal	Spain	DNF	
	Lily Partridge	Great Britain	DNF	
	Cecilia Norrbom	Sweden	DNF	
	Andrea Deelstra	Netherlands	DNF	
	Ilona Marhele	Latvia	DNF	
	Laura Hottenrott	Germany	DNF	
	Charlotte Purdue	Great Britain	DNF	
	Sonia Tsekini-Boudouri	Greece	DNF	
