= 2019 European Athletics U23 Championships – Women's triple jump =

The women's triple jump event at the 2019 European Athletics U23 Championships was held in Gävle, Sweden, at Gavlehov Stadium Park 11–12 July 2019.

== Medalists ==
Gold	Silver	Bronze
Diana Zagainova; Lithuania	Tuğba Danışmaz; Turkey	Viyaleta Skvartsova; Belarus

== Results ==
=== Qualification ===
Qualification rule: 13.40 (Q) or the 12 best results (q) qualified for the final.

Rank	Group	Name	Nationality	#1	#2	#3	Results	Notes
1	B	Naomi Ogbeta	Great Britain	13.57			13.57	Q
2	A	Diana Zagainova	Lithuania	13.50			13.50	Q
3	B	Marina Lobato	Spain	12.88	13.43		13.43	Q
4	B	Emelie Nyman-Wänseth	Sweden	13.42			13.42	Q, PB
5	A	Viyaleta Skvartsova	Belarus	13.40			13.40	Q
6	B	Tuğba Danışmaz	Turkey	13.32	13.31	x	13.32	q
7	B	Gaja Wota	Poland	12.83	13.01	13.20	13.20	q
8	B	Georgiana Iuliana Anitei	Romania	13.02	13.15	12.86	13.15	q
9	A	Yelyzaveta Babii	Ukraine	13.13	13.09	12.66	13.13	q, SB
10	A	Zuzana Durkechová	Slovakia	12.54	12.98	x	12.98	q, SB
11	B	Ilionis Guillaume	France	12.76	12.70	12.97	12.97	q
12	A	Eszter Bajnok	Hungary	x	x	12.97	12.97	q
13	A	Saara Hakanen	Finland	12.52	12.72	12.86	12.86	
14	A	Agnieszka Bednarek	Poland	x	12.45	12.74	12.74	
15	A	Maeva Phesor	France	x	12.63	x	12.63	
16	A	Marija Stojadinović	Serbia	x	12.53	12.48	12.53	NU23R
17	A	Diana Dovhopol	Ukraine	12.34	12.43	12.32	12.43	
18	B	Oleksandra Levchenko	Ukraine	12.41	x	11.84	12.41	
19	B	Alina Tobler	Switzerland	x	12.35	12.22	12.35	
20	B	Claire Azzopardi	Malta	x	11.90	12.23	12.23	
21	A	Marija Ivanković	Croatia	12.15	12.19	12.10	12.19	
22	A	Fatima Koné	Sweden	12.11	12.05	x	12.11	
	B	Jessica Barreira	Portugal	x	x	x	NM	

=== Final ===
Rank	Name	Nationality	#1	#2	#3	#4	#5	#6	Result	Notes
1st place, gold medalist(s)	Diana Zagainova	Lithuania	13.89	x	13.34	13.87	x	13.84	13.89	
2nd place, silver medalist(s)	Tuğba Danışmaz	Turkey	13.54	13.48	13.59	13.42	13.34	13.85	13.85	NU23R
3rd place, bronze medalist(s)	Viyaleta Skvartsova	Belarus	13.24	12.93	13.39	x	13.79	13.48	13.79	SB
4	Naomi Ogbeta	Great Britain	13.37	13.57	13.40	13.49	x	13.64	13.64	
5	Georgiana Iuliana Anitei	Romania	13.05	13.08	x	13.23	13.55	13.26	13.55	PB
6	Emelie Nyman-Wänseth	Sweden	13.24	13.46	x	x	13.49	12.05	13.49	PB
7	Marina Lobato	Spain	12.86	x	13.18	x	13.08	x	13.18	
8	Yelyzaveta Babii	Ukraine	x	x	12.95	x	x	x	12.95	
9	Eszter Bajnok	Hungary	12.72	12.93	x				12.93	
10	Gaja Wota	Poland	12.91	x	12.75				12.91	
11	Ilionis Guillaume	France	x	x	12.89				12.89	
12	Zuzana Durkechová	Slovakia	12.78	12.80	x				12.80	
