= Asteria Limai =

Belarusian sprinter

Personal information
- Native name: Астерия Лимай
- Nationality: Belarusian
- Born: Asteria Uzo Limai; 19 July 2001 (age 25)
- Height: 173 cm (5 ft 8 in)
- Weight: 57 kg (126 lb)

Sport
- Sport: Women's Relay
- Event: 400 metres

Achievements and titles
- National finals: 2019 Belarusian U20s; • 400 m, 2nd (silver); • 200 m, 3rd (bronze); 2019 Belarusian Champs; • 200 m, 5th; 2020 Belarusian Ind. U20s; • 400 m, 1st (gold); • 200 m, 1st (gold); 2020 Belarusian Indoors; • 60 m, 4th; 2021 Belarusian Indoors; • 4 × 400 m, 1st (gold); 2021 Belarusian Indoors; • 60 m, 3rd (bronze); 2021 Belarusian Champs; • 200 m, 3rd (bronze); 2022 Belarusian Champs; • 400 m, 2nd (silver); • 400 m, 3rd (bronze); • 4 × 100 m, 2nd (silver); • 4 × 400 m, 3rd (bronze); 2023 Belarusian Indoors; • 4 × 400 m, 3rd (bronze); 2023 Belarusian Champs; • 400 m, 5th

Asteria Uzo Limai (Belarusian: Астерия Узо Лимай; born 19 July 2001) is a Belarusian athlete. She competed in the women's 4 × 400 metres relay event at the 2020 Summer Olympics.

Limai won the silver medal at the 2019 European Athletics U20 Championships in the 4 × 400 while setting a national U20 record. She was on the winning team from Minsk in the 2020 Belarusian Athletics Championships. She placed third in the 2021 European Athletics Team Championships First League in the same discipline. In February 2022, she placed first in the Belarus Indoor Championships.

She was born in Minsk in Belarus on 19 July 2001.
