= Darya Paluektava =

Belarusian racewalker (born 1993)

Personal information
- Native name: Дар'я Палуэктава
- Born: 4 March 1993 (age 32)

Sport
- Country: Belarus
- Event: Racewalking

Darya Paluektava (Belarusian: Дар'я Палуэктава, born 4 March 1993) is a Belarusian racewalker. In 2019, she competed in the women's 20 kilometres walk event at the 2019 World Athletics Championships held in Doha, Qatar. She finished in 14th place.

In 2020, she won the silver medal in the women's 10,000 metres walk at the 2020 Belarusian Athletics Championships held in Minsk, Belarus.
