= Yuliya Bliznets =

Belarusian sprinter

Personal information
- Nationality: Belarusian
- Born: 5 November 1994 (age 30)

Sport
- Sport: Athletics
- Event: 400 metres

Yuliya Bliznets (Belarusian: Юлія Блізнец; born 5 November 1994) is a Belarusian athlete. She competed in the women's 4 × 400 metres relay event at the 2020 Summer Olympics.

Bliznets is a three-time Belarusian Athletics Championships winner, and she is the Belarusian record holder in the mixed 4 x 400 metres relay.
