= Aliaksandra Khilmanovich =

Belarusian sprinter

Personal information
- Nationality: Belarusian
- Born: 14 December 1996 (age 28) Grodno, Belarus

Sport
- Sport: Athletics
- Event: 400 metres

Aliaksandra Khilmanovich (Belarusian: Аляксандра Хільмановіч; born 14 December 1996) is a Belarusian athlete. She competed in the women's 4 × 400 metres relay event at the 2020 Summer Olympics.
