= Volha Mazuronak =

Belarusian long-distance runner

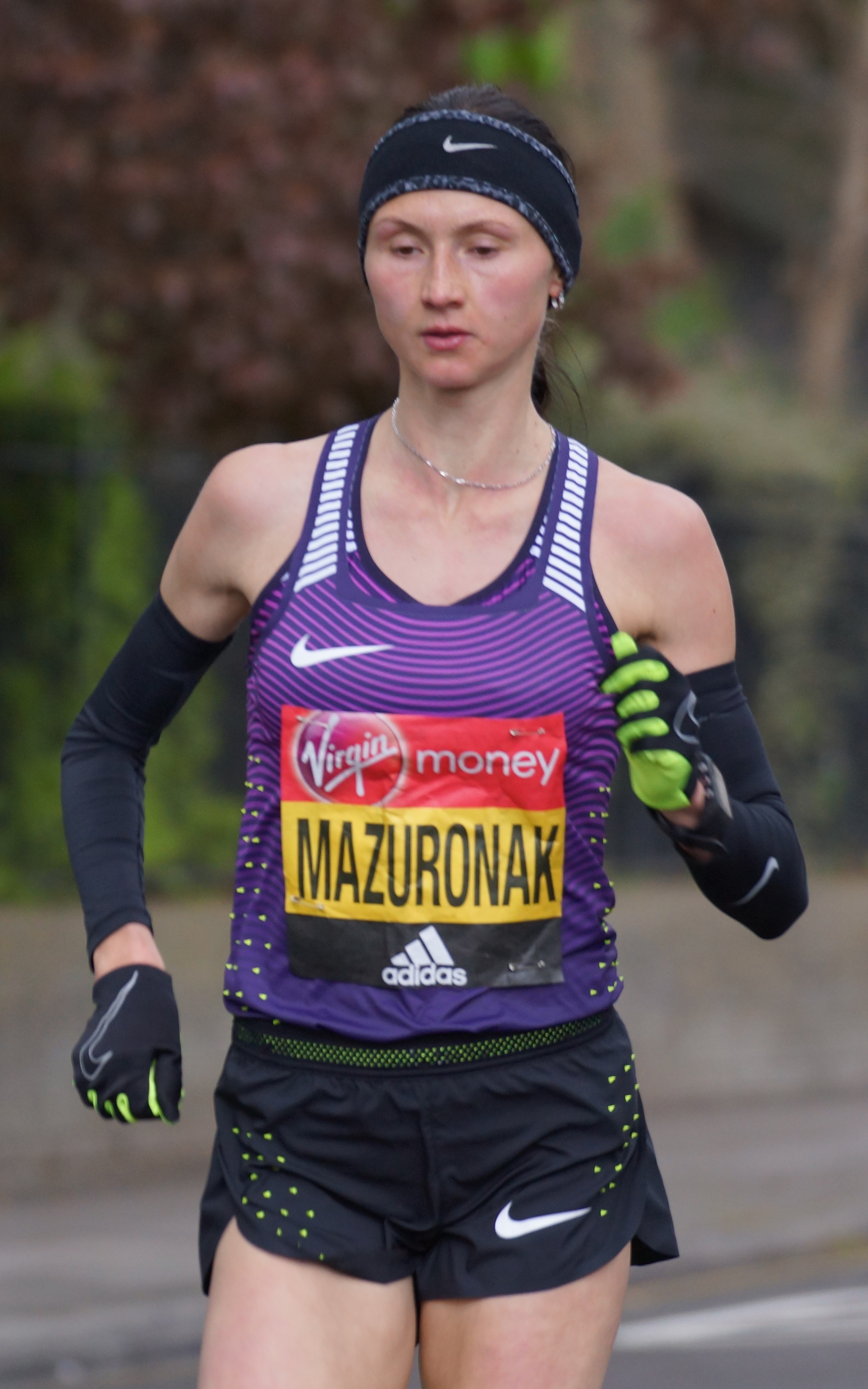
- Mazuronak competing at the 2016 London Marathon

Personal information
- Born: 14 April 1989 (age 37) Karaganda
- Height: 165 cm (5 ft 5 in)
- Weight: 49 kg (108 lb)

Sport
- Country: Belarus
- Sport: Track and field
- Event: Marathon
Medal record
Representing Belarus
European Championships
Gold medal – first place	2018 Berlin	Marathon
- Updated on 12 August 2018

Volha Siarheyeuna Mazuronak (Belarusian: Вольга Сяргееўна Мазуронак; born 14 April 1989) is a Belarusian long-distance runner and former racewalker. She is a three-time national champion. Mazuronak has a marathon best of 2:23:54 and finished fourth at the London Marathon in 2016. She has won marathons in Siberia and California and was a silver medalist on the track at the 2015 Military World Games.

== Career ==
Her international debut came in distance running and she placed in the top 100 at the 2005 IAAF World Cross Country Championships junior race. A switch to racewalking gave better results as she took fourth in the 5000 metres track walk at the 2005 World Youth Championships in Athletics then placed in the top five at both the 2006 World Junior Championships in Athletics and the 2006 IAAF World Race Walking Cup junior race. She also competed at the 2005 European Race Walking Cup but was disqualified due to lifting. She made her last appearance in racewalking in 2007 and did not compete at a high level after this for another four years.

Mazuronak returned to her athletic career in 2011 as a long-distance runner after giving birth to her son in 2009. In her road running debut she won the Warsaw Half Marathon in a time of 1:14:25 minutes. She took her first marathon win on her debut at the Dêbno Marathon in Poland, crossing the line in 2:33:56 hours. She made her senior international debut at the European Cup 10000m, but was down the rankings in 32nd. She won the Siberian International Marathon in August, but her win streak at that distance came to an end at the Baltimore Marathon, where she was fourth. A new best of 2:33:33 hours came in a runner-up finish at the Łódź Marathon.

As a student of Maxim Tank Belarusian State Pedagogical University, she was selected to run at the 2013 Summer Universiade and placed 14th in the half marathon. She achieved a 5000 metres/10,000 metres double at the national championships that year, but also failed to finish at the Honolulu Marathon. Mazuronak's first international medal followed at the 2014 European Team Championships First League, where she was third in the 5000 m behind Ana Dulce Félix and Fionnuala Britton, setting a personal best of 15:35.44 minutes. Another best came at the 2014 European Athletics Championships, though her 10,000 m time of 32:31.15 minutes left her in seventh place. On the road circuit that year she had top three places at several Polish races, including a half marathon best of 72:43 minutes, and established herself as a top level marathon runner with a win at the California International Marathon in 2:27:33 hours.

Mazuronak entered the top level of marathon running at the 2015 London Marathon and finished in ninth place with a best of 2:25:36 hours. She was the second best European at the race, behind Ana Dulce Félix. Two international medals followed, with 5000 m silvers at both the 2015 European Team Championships and the Military World Games.

Her upward trend continued at the 2016 London Marathon as, after a battle for third with Florence Kiplagat, she took fourth place with a near two-minute improvement of 2:23:54 hours. The manner of her performance was questioned by fellow runner Mara Yamauchi, as Mazuronak had run the second half of the race three minutes faster than the first – despite the first half being downhill and the second half being uphill. Her second half of the marathon was also over a minute faster than she had ever run for the half marathon. The London Marathon organisers defended Mazuronak, noting she had given a blood test for doping before the race.

She finished in fifth place in the women's marathon event at the 2016 Summer Olympics. 2018 saw Mazuronak win the European Athletics Championships marathon despite a nose bleed and taking the incorrect route in the last few hundred meters.

== Personal bests ==
- 5000 metres – 15:35.21 min (2015)
- 10,000 metres – 32:31.15 min (2014)
- Half marathon – 72:02 min (2015)
- Marathon – 2:23:54 hrs (2016)

== International competitions ==
Year	Competition	Venue	Position	Event	Notes
2005	World Cross Country Championships	Saint-Galmier, France	100th	Junior race	25:10
2005	World Cross Country Championships	Saint-Galmier, France	17th	Junior team	376 pts
2005	World Youth Championships	Marrakesh, Morocco	4th	5000 m track walk	22:52.06
2005	European Race Walking Cup	Miskolc, Hungary	—	10 km junior	DQ
2006	World Race Walking Cup	A Coruña, Spain	4th	10 km junior	47:40
2006	World Race Walking Cup	A Coruña, Spain	3rd	Junior team	15 pts
2006	World Junior Championships	Beijing, China	5th	10,000 m walk	47:37.11
2012	European Cup 10000m	Bilbao, Spain	32nd	10,000 m	34:27.86
2013	Universiade	Kazan, Russia	14th	Half marathon	1:17:07
2014	European Team Championships	Tallinn, Estonia	3rd	5000 m	15:35.44
2014	European Championships	Zürich, Switzerland,	7th	10,000 m	32:31.15
2015	European Team Championships	Cheboksary, Russia	2nd	5000 m	15:51.89
2015	Military World Games	Mungyeong, South Korea	2nd	5000 m	15:35.21
2016	Olympic Games	Rio de Janeiro, Brazil	5th	Marathon	2:24:48
2018	European Championships	Berlin, Germany	1st	Marathon	2:26:22
2019	Hong Kong Marathon	Hong Kong	1st	Hong Kong Marathon	2:26:13
2019	World Championships	Doha, Catar	5th	Marathon	2:36:21
2021	Olympic Games	Sapporo, Japan	5th	Marathon	2:29:06

== National titles ==
- Belarusian Athletics Championships
  - 5000 m: 2013
  - 10,000 m: 2013, 2014

== Road race wins ==
- Warsaw Half Marathon: 2012
- Dêbno Marathon: 2012
- Siberian International Marathon: 2012
- Bieg Lwa: 2013
- Bieg Papieski: 2014
- Walbrzych Half Marathon: 2014
- California International Marathon: 2014
- Minsk Half Marathon: 2015
- Düsseldorf Marathon: 2018
- Grandma's Marathon: 2024 (course record)
