= Yuliya Karol =

Belarusian middle-distance runner

Personal information
- Nationality: Belarusian
- Born: 26 June 1991 (age 35)
- Height: 162 cm (5 ft 4 in)
- Weight: 57 kg (126 lb)

Sport
- Country: Belarus
- Sport: Athletics
- Event: Women's 800m

Yuliya Karol (born 26 June 1991) is a Belarusian middle-distance runner. She competed at the 2016 Summer Olympics in the women's 800 metres. Her time of 2:01.09 in the heats did not qualify her for the semifinals.

Karol was served with a four-year competition ban for a doping violation with an expiration date of 29 June 2025.
