= Nastassia Ivanova =

Belarusian long-distance runner

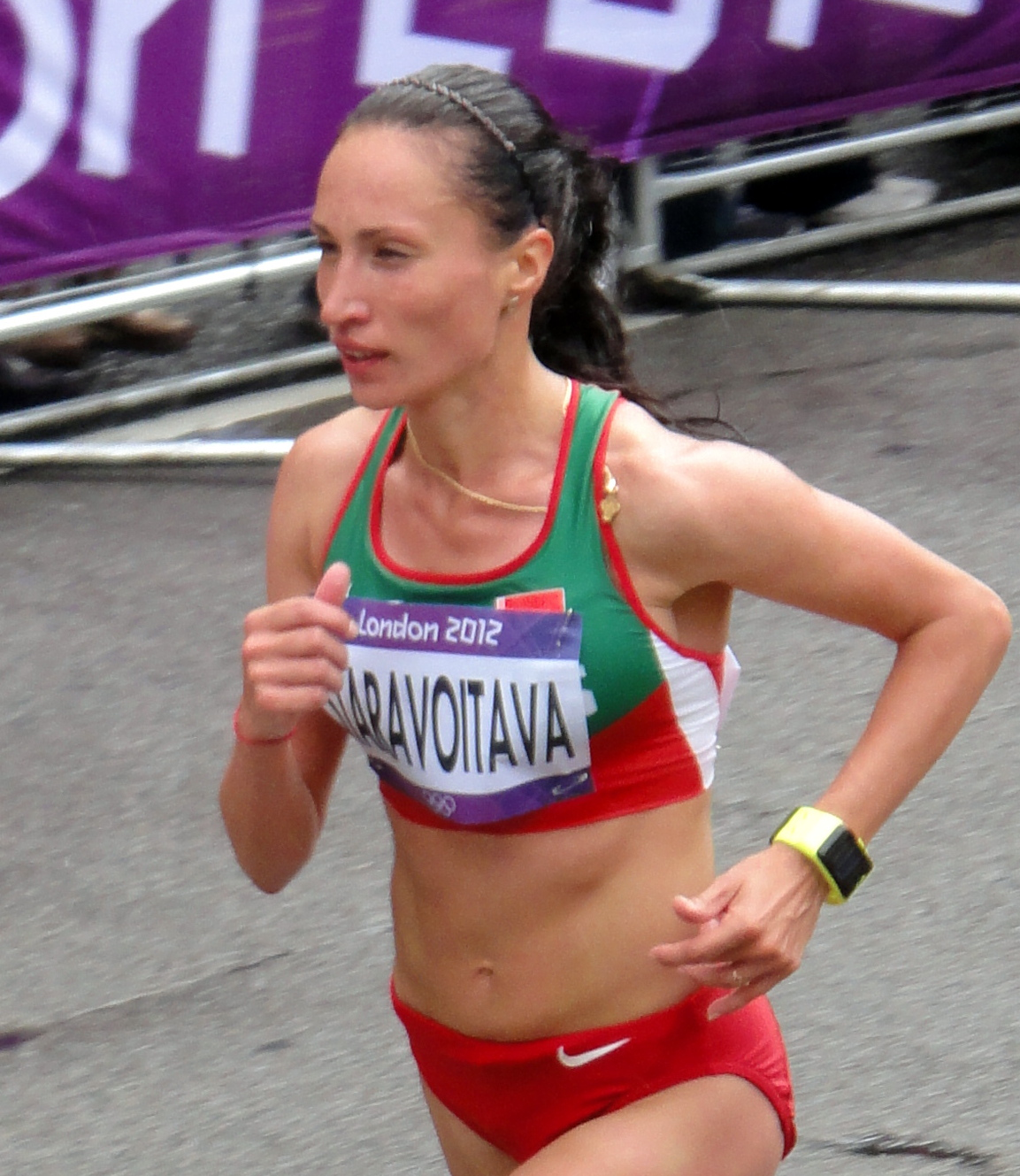

Personal information
- Born: November 4, 1982 (age 43)
- Height: 1.63 m (5 ft 4 in)
- Weight: 50 kg (110 lb)

Sport
- Country: Belarus
- Sport: Athletics
- Event: Marathon
Medal record
Women's long-distance running
Representing Belarus
European Marathon Cup
Gold medal – first place	2018 Berlin	Marathon

Nastassia Ivanova (Belarusian: Настасся Іванова; née Staravoitava; Belarusian: Старавойтава; born November 4, 1982, in Zhodzina) is a Belarusian long-distance runner. She competed in the marathon at the 2012 Summer Olympics, placing 33rd with a time of 2:30:25. She competed in the women's marathon event at the 2016 Summer Olympics.
