= Belarus Athletic Federation =

Sports governing body in Belarus

- Sport: Athletics
- Abbreviation: BAF
- Affiliation: World Athletics
- Regional affiliation: EAA
- Headquarters: Minsk
- President: Ivan Tsikhan

Official website
- www.bfla.eu
- (Belarus)

The Belarus Athletic Federation (Belarusian: Беларускaя федэрацыя легкай атлетыкі) is the governing body for the sport of athletics in Belarus.

In 2022, World Athletics imposed sanctions against the Member Federation of Belarus because of the 2022 Russian invasion of Ukraine, and all athletes, support personnel, and officials from Belarus were excluded from all World Athletics Series events for the foreseeable future. World Athletics Council also applied sanctions on the Belarus Athletic Federation, including banning its hosting of any international or European athletics events, representation at Congress or in decisions which require Congressional votes, involvement of its personnel in programs, and accreditation to attend any World Athletics Series events.

== Affiliations ==
- World Athletics
- European Athletic Association (EAA)
- Belarus Olympic Committee

== National records ==
The Federation maintains the Belarusian records in athletics.
