= Katsiaryna Hanchar =

Belarusian sprinter

Katsiaryna Hanchar (Belarusian: Кацярына Ганчар; born 30 August 1988, in Gomel) is a Belarusian sprinter. She competed for the Belarusian team in the 4 × 100 metres relay at the 2012 Summer Olympics; the team placed 14th with a time of 43.90 in Round 1 and did not qualify for the final.
