= Maryna Damantsevich =

Belarusian long-distance runner

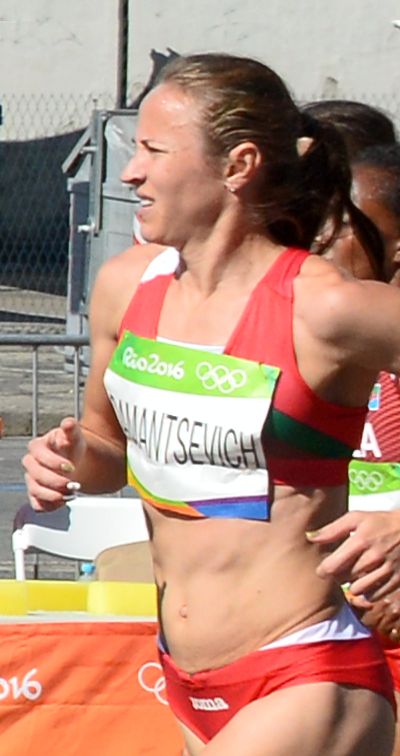
- Maryna Damantsevich at the 2016 Summer Olympics

Personal information
- Born: 10 February 1984 (age 42)
- Height: 1.62 m (5 ft 4 in)
- Weight: 51 kg (112 lb)

Sport
- Country: Belarus
- Sport: Track and field
- Event: Marathon
Medal record
Women's long-distance running
Representing Belarus
European Marathon Cup
Gold medal – first place	2018 Berlin	Marathon

Maryna Damantsevich (born 10 February 1984) is a Belarusian long-distance runner who specialises in the marathon. She competed in the women's marathon event at the 2016 Summer Olympics. In 2018, she finished in 4th place in the women's marathon at the 2018 European Athletics Championships, held in Berlin, Germany.
