= Belarusian Athletics Championships =

Annual track and field competition

- Sport: Track and field
- Founded: 1992
- Country: Belarus

The Belarusian Athletics Championships is an annual outdoor track and field competition organised by the Belarusian Athletic Federation, which serves as the national championship for the sport in Belarus.

The event was first held in 1992, following the dissolution of the Soviet Union. It replaced the Soviet Athletics Championships as the national event for athletes from Belarus. Separate annual championship events are held for cross country running, road running and racewalking events. There is also a Belarusian Indoor Athletics Championships.

== Events ==
The competition programme features a total of 38 individual Belarusian Championship athletics events events, 19 for men and 19 for women. For each of the sexes, there are seven track running events, three obstacle events, four jumps, four throws, and one combined track and field event.

Track running

- 100 metres, 200 metres, 400 metres, 800 metres, 1500 metres, 5000 metres, 10,000 metres

Obstacle events

- 100 metres hurdles (women only), 110 metres hurdles (men only), 400 metres hurdles, 3000 metres steeplechase

Jumping events

- Pole vault, high jump, long jump, triple jump

Throwing events

- Shot put, discus throw, javelin throw, hammer throw

Combined events

- Decathlon (men only), Heptathlon (women only)

The women's programme expanded to match the men's within its first decade. The women's field events reached parity with the men's after the addition of the pole vault in 1997. The women's steeplechase appeared in 2000 metres steeplechase format in 1995 before taking the standard 3000 m distance in 2001. The 3000 metres and 5000 m alternated in early years, with the 5000 m becoming the regular event in 2003.

== Championships records ==
=== Men ===
Event	Record	Athlete/Team	Date	Place	Ref.
200 m	20.40 (+1.5 m/s) NR	Mikita Zhyhar	25 July 2025	Brest	
400 m					
110 m hurdles					

=== Women ===
Event	Record	Athlete/Team	Date	Place	Ref.
100 m					
200 m					
800 m					
High jump					
Pole vault	4.72 m NR	Iryna Zhuk	2 August 2020	Minsk	
Long jump					
Hammer throw					
