= Viyaleta Skvartsova =

Belarusian triple jumper

Personal information
- Born: 15 April 1998 (age 28) Vitebsk, Belarus

Sport
- Sport: Athletics
- Events: Triple jump, long jump

Viyaleta Maksimauna Skvartsova (Belarusian: Віялета Максімаўна Скварцова; born 15 April 1998) is a Belarusian athlete specialising in the triple jump. She represented her country at the 2021 European Indoor Championships finishing fourth. Earlier she won a bronze medal at the 2019 European U23 Championships.

== International competitions ==
Year	Competition	Venue	Position	Event	Notes
Representing Belarus
2015	World Youth Championships	Cali, Colombia	7th	Long jump	6.19 m
2016	World U20 Championships	Bydgoszcz, Poland	14th (q)	Long jump	5.52 m
2017	European U20 Championships	Grosseto, Italy	1st	Triple jump	14.21 m
2018	European Championships	Berlin, Germany	21st (q)	Triple jump	13.82 m
2019	European U23 Championships	Gävle, Sweden	3rd	Triple jump	13.79 m
2021	European Indoor Championships	Toruń, Poland	4th	Triple jump	14.35 m
2021	Olympic Games	Tokyo, Japan	18th (q)	Triple jump	14.05 m

== Personal bests ==
Outdoor

- Long jump – 6.37 (+0.4 m/s, Brest 2020)
- Triple jump – 14.17 (-0.3 m/s, Brest 2020)

Indoor

- Long jump – 6.56 (Tartu 2020)
- Triple jump – 14.39 (Toruń 2021)

== Protest over misplayed anthem ==
At the Medal Ceremony at the 2017 European U20 Championships, Skvartsova stepped off of the podium and stood nearby when the anthem of Bosnia and Herzegovina was played instead of the anthem of Belarus. Skvartsova waited for the flag to be raised, and then walked some distance from the podium, and waited in silent protest for the music to finish. After the music stopped, she spoke with officials, who appeared to ask her to take part in the remainder of the ceremony, which Skvartsova politely declined to do.
