= Nina Savina (runner) =

Belarusian long-distance runner (born 1993)

Personal information
- Native name: Ніна Сяргееўна Савіна
- Born: Nina Siarheyeuna Savina; 21 July 1993 (age 32) Babruysk, Belarus

Sport
- Country: Belarus
- Event: Long-distance running
Medal record
Women's long-distance running
Representing Belarus
European Marathon Cup
Gold medal – first place	2018 Berlin	Marathon

Nina Siarheyeuna Savina (Belarusian: Ніна Сяргееўна Савіна; born 21 July 1993) is a Belarusian long-distance runner.

== Early life and career ==
Savina was born 21 July 1993 in Babruysk, Belarus.

She competed in the girls' 3000 metres event at the 2010 Summer Youth Olympics held in Singapore. The following year, she competed in the junior women's race at the 2011 IAAF World Cross Country Championships held in Punta Umbría, Spain. She finished in 72nd place. A few years later, she competed in both the women's 5000 metres and women's 10,000 metres events at the 2015 European Athletics U23 Championships held in Tallinn, Estonia. In 2016, she competed in the women's half marathon at the European Athletics Championships held in Amsterdam, Netherlands.

In 2018, she competed in the women's half marathon at the IAAF World Half Marathon Championships held in Valencia, Spain. She finished in 42nd place. In the same year, she also finished in 12th place in the women's marathon at the 2018 European Athletics Championships held in Berlin, Germany. She won the gold medal in the 2018 European Marathon Cup. In 2019, she competed in the women's event at the 2019 European 10,000m Cup held in London, United Kingdom.

In 2020, she won the gold medal in the women's 10,000 metres event and the bronze medal in the women's 5000 metres event at the Belarusian Athletics Championships held in Minsk, Belarus.

== International competitions ==
Year	Competition	Venue	Position	Event	Notes
Representing Belarus
2010	Summer Youth Olympics	Singapore	6th	3000 m	9:50.04
