= 10,000 metres at the Olympics =

10,000 metres at the Olympic Games
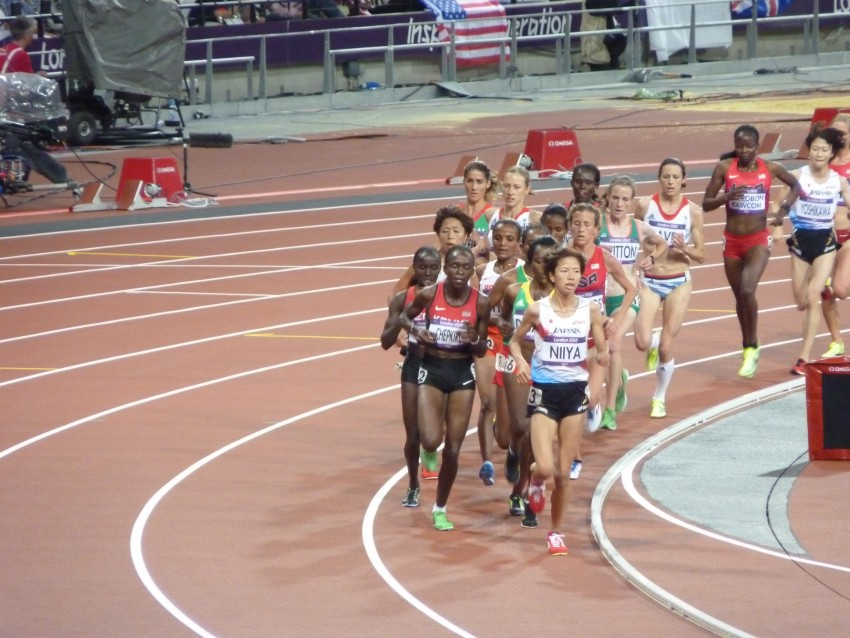
- The 2012 Olympic women's 10,000 m final

Overview
- Sport: Athletics
- Gender: Men and women
- Years held: Men: 1912–2024; Women: 1988–2024

Olympic record
- Men: Joshua Cheptegei (UGA) 26:43.14 (2024)
- Women: Almaz Ayana (ETH) 29:17.45 (2016)

Reigning champion
- Men: Joshua Cheptegei (UGA)
- Women: Beatrice Chebet (KEN)

The 10,000 metres at the Summer Olympics is the longest track running event held at the multi-sport event. The men's 10,000 m has been present on the Olympic athletics programme since 1912. The women's event was added to the programme over seventy years later, at the 1988 Olympics. It is the most prestigious 10,000 m race at elite level. The competition format is a straight final between around 30 athletes, although prior to 2004 a qualifying round was held.

The Olympic records for the event was both set by an Ethiopian at the 2016 Rio Olympics and an Ugandan at the 2024 Paris Olympics: Joshua Cheptegei set the men's record at 26:43.14 minutes, while Almaz Ayana set the women's mark at 29:17.45 minutes. The 10,000 metres world record has been broken at the Olympics on two occasions; Lasse Virén's winning time of 27:38.35 minutes in 1972 stood as the record for less than a year, and Almaz Ayana knocked 14 seconds off the women's record in 2016.

Six men have won the Olympic title twice: Paavo Nurmi became the first in 1928 and he was followed by Emil Zátopek, Lasse Virén, Haile Gebrselassie, Kenenisa Bekele and Mo Farah. Two women have achieved the feat: Derartu Tulu won her second title in 2004 and Tirunesh Dibaba had back-to-back wins in 2008 and 2012. Derartu Tulu is the only athlete to have reached the podium on three occasions. Historically, athletes in this event have also had success in the 5000 metres at the Olympics. The winner of the men's Olympic 10,000 m has completed a long-distance track double on nine occasions, the most recent being Farah at the 2016 Rio Olympics. Tirunesh Dibaba and Sifan Hassan are the only women to complete this double (at the 2008 Beijing Olympics and the 2020 Tokyo Olympics). At the 2016 Rio Olympics, Almaz Ayana smashed the world record in a time of 29:17.45. It was the first time four women broke 30 minutes in a single race.

At the 2024 Olympic Games in Paris Joshua Cheptegei won gold in the 10,000 metres final, in a new Olympic Record of 26:43.14. Ethiopia is the most successful nation in the event, with ten gold medals among its total of 24. Finland is the next most successful, with six gold medals and thirteen overall. Finland's period of great success in early 20th century led to wide usage of the nickname the Flying Finns; Kaarlo Maaninka was the last Finnish athlete to medal over 10,000 m, in 1980 (Martti Vainio finished second in 1984 but was disqualified for doping). Kenya has won eleven medals, although Naftali Temu is the only Kenyan to have won Olympic gold.

It was not the first long-distance track event to feature at an Olympic competition: 5-mile (8 km) races featured at the 1906 Intercalated Games and the 1908 Summer Olympics before the metric 5000 metres and 10,000 m events were initiated.

== Medal summary ==
=== Men ===
Games	Gold	Silver	Bronze
1912 Stockholm	Hannes Kolehmainen; Finland	Lewis Tewanima; United States	Albin Stenroos; Finland
1920 Antwerp	Paavo Nurmi; Finland	Joseph Guillemot; France	James Wilson; Great Britain
1924 Paris	Ville Ritola; Finland	Edvin Wide; Sweden	Eero Berg; Finland
1928 Amsterdam	Paavo Nurmi; Finland	Ville Ritola; Finland	Edvin Wide; Sweden
1932 Los Angeles	Janusz Kusociński; Poland	Volmari Iso-Hollo; Finland	Lasse Virtanen; Finland
1936 Berlin	Ilmari Salminen; Finland	Arvo Askola; Finland	Volmari Iso-Hollo; Finland
1948 London	Emil Zátopek; Czechoslovakia	Alain Mimoun; France	Bertil Albertsson; Sweden
1952 Helsinki	Emil Zátopek; Czechoslovakia	Alain Mimoun; France	Aleksandr Anufriyev; Soviet Union
1956 Melbourne	Vladimir Kuts; Soviet Union	József Kovács; Hungary	Al Lawrence; Australia
1960 Rome	Pyotr Bolotnikov; Soviet Union	Hans Grodotzki; United Team of Germany	Dave Power; Australia
1964 Tokyo	Billy Mills; United States	Mohammed Gammoudi; Tunisia	Ron Clarke; Australia
1968 Mexico City	Naftali Temu; Kenya	Mamo Wolde; Ethiopia	Mohammed Gammoudi; Tunisia
1972 Munich	Lasse Virén; Finland	Emiel Puttemans; Belgium	Miruts Yifter; Ethiopia
1976 Montreal	Lasse Virén; Finland	Carlos Lopes; Portugal	Brendan Foster; Great Britain
1980 Moscow	Miruts Yifter; Ethiopia	Kaarlo Maaninka; Finland	Mohamed Kedir; Ethiopia
1984 Los Angeles	Alberto Cova; Italy	Mike McLeod; Great Britain	Michael Musyoki; Kenya
1988 Seoul	Brahim Boutayeb; Morocco	Salvatore Antibo; Italy	Kipkemboi Kimeli; Kenya
1992 Barcelona	Khalid Skah; Morocco	Richard Chelimo; Kenya	Addis Abebe; Ethiopia
1996 Atlanta	Haile Gebrselassie; Ethiopia	Paul Tergat; Kenya	Saleh Hissou; Morocco
2000 Sydney	Haile Gebrselassie; Ethiopia	Paul Tergat; Kenya	Assefa Mezgebu; Ethiopia
2004 Athens	Kenenisa Bekele; Ethiopia	Sileshi Sihine; Ethiopia	Zersenay Tadese; Eritrea
2008 Beijing	Kenenisa Bekele; Ethiopia	Sileshi Sihine; Ethiopia	Micah Kogo; Kenya
2012 London	Mo Farah; Great Britain	Galen Rupp; United States	Tariku Bekele; Ethiopia
2016 Rio de Janeiro	Mo Farah; Great Britain	Paul Tanui; Kenya	Tamirat Tola; Ethiopia
2020 Tokyo	Selemon Barega; Ethiopia	Joshua Cheptegei; Uganda	Jacob Kiplimo; Uganda
2024 Paris	Joshua Cheptegei; Uganda	Berihu Aregawi; Ethiopia	Grant Fisher; United States

==== Multiple medalists ====
Rank	Athlete	Nation	Olympics	Gold	Silver	Bronze	Total
1=	Paavo Nurmi	Finland	1920–1928	2	0	0	2
1=	Emil Zátopek	Czechoslovakia	1948–1952	2	0	0	2
1=	Lasse Virén	Finland	1972–1976	2	0	0	2
1=	Haile Gebrselassie	Ethiopia	1996–2000	2	0	0	2
1=	Kenenisa Bekele	Ethiopia	2004–2008	2	0	0	2
1=	Mo Farah	Great Britain	2012–2016	2	0	0	2
7=	Ville Ritola	Finland	1924–1928	1	1	0	2
7=	Joshua Cheptegei	Uganda	2020–2024	1	1	0	2
9	Miruts Yifter	Ethiopia	1972–1980	1	0	1	2
10=	Alain Mimoun	France	1948–1952	0	2	0	2
10=	Paul Tergat	Kenya	1996–2000	0	2	0	2
10=	Sileshi Sihine	Ethiopia	2004–2008	0	2	0	2
13=	Edvin Wide	Sweden	1924–1928	0	1	1	2
13=	Volmari Iso-Hollo	Finland	1932–1936	0	1	1	2
13=	Mohammed Gammoudi	Tunisia	1968–1972	0	1	1	2

==== Medals by country ====
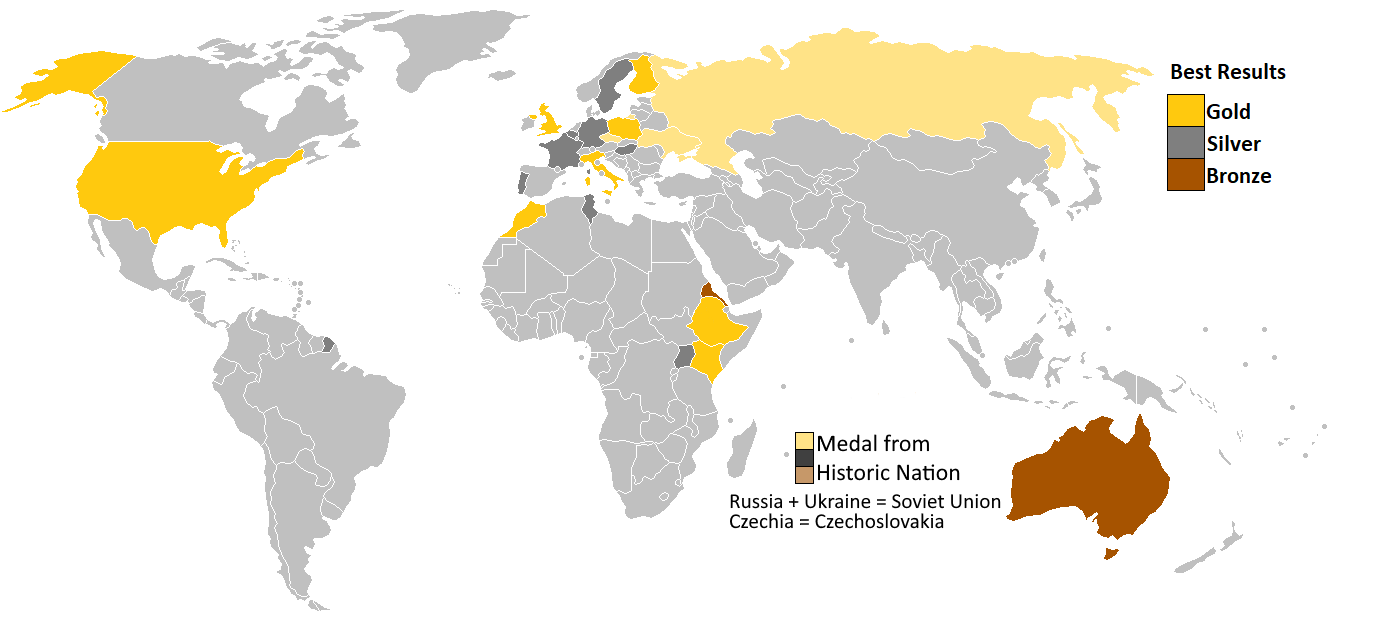
Map of countries' best results - Men's 10,000 metres

Rank	Nation	Gold	Silver	Bronze	Total
1	Finland	7	4	4	15
2	Ethiopia	6	4	6	16
3	Great Britain	2	1	2	5
4	Morocco	2	0	1	3
4	Soviet Union	2	0	1	3
6	Czechoslovakia	2	0	0	2
7	Kenya	1	4	3	8
8	United States	1	2	1	4
9	Uganda	1	1	1	3
10	Italy	1	1	0	2
11	Poland	1	0	0	1
12	France	0	3	0	3
13	Sweden	0	1	2	3
14	Tunisia	0	1	1	2
15	Belgium	0	1	0	1
15	Hungary	0	1	0	1
15	Portugal	0	1	0	1
15	United Team of Germany	0	1	0	1
19	Australia	0	0	3	3
20	Eritrea	0	0	1	1
Totals (20 entries)		26	26	26	78

=== Women ===
Games	Gold	Silver	Bronze
1988 Seoul	Olga Bondarenko; Soviet Union	Liz McColgan; Great Britain	Olena Zhupiyeva-Vyazova; Soviet Union
1992 Barcelona	Derartu Tulu; Ethiopia	Elana Meyer; South Africa	Lynn Jennings; United States
1996 Atlanta	Fernanda Ribeiro; Portugal	Wang Junxia; China	Gete Wami; Ethiopia
2000 Sydney	Derartu Tulu; Ethiopia	Gete Wami; Ethiopia	Fernanda Ribeiro; Portugal
2004 Athens	Xing Huina; China	Ejagayehu Dibaba; Ethiopia	Derartu Tulu; Ethiopia
2008 Beijing	Tirunesh Dibaba; Ethiopia	Shalane Flanagan; United States	Linet Masai; Kenya
2012 London	Tirunesh Dibaba; Ethiopia	Sally Kipyego; Kenya	Vivian Cheruiyot; Kenya
2016 Rio de Janeiro	Almaz Ayana; Ethiopia	Vivian Cheruiyot; Kenya	Tirunesh Dibaba; Ethiopia
2020 Tokyo	Sifan Hassan; Netherlands	Kalkidan Gezahegne; Bahrain	Letesenbet Gidey; Ethiopia
2024 Paris	Beatrice Chebet; Kenya	Nadia Battocletti; Italy	Sifan Hassan; Netherlands

==== Multiple medalists ====
Rank	Athlete	Nation	Olympics	Gold	Silver	Bronze	Total
1	Derartu Tulu	Ethiopia	1992–2004	2	0	1	3
1	Tirunesh Dibaba	Ethiopia	2008–2016	2	0	1	3
3	Fernanda Ribeiro	Portugal	1996–2000	1	0	1	2
3	Sifan Hassan	Netherlands	2020-2024	1	0	1	2
5	Gete Wami	Ethiopia	1996–2000	0	1	1	2
5	Vivian Cheruiyot	Kenya	2012–2016	0	1	1	2

==== Medalists by country ====
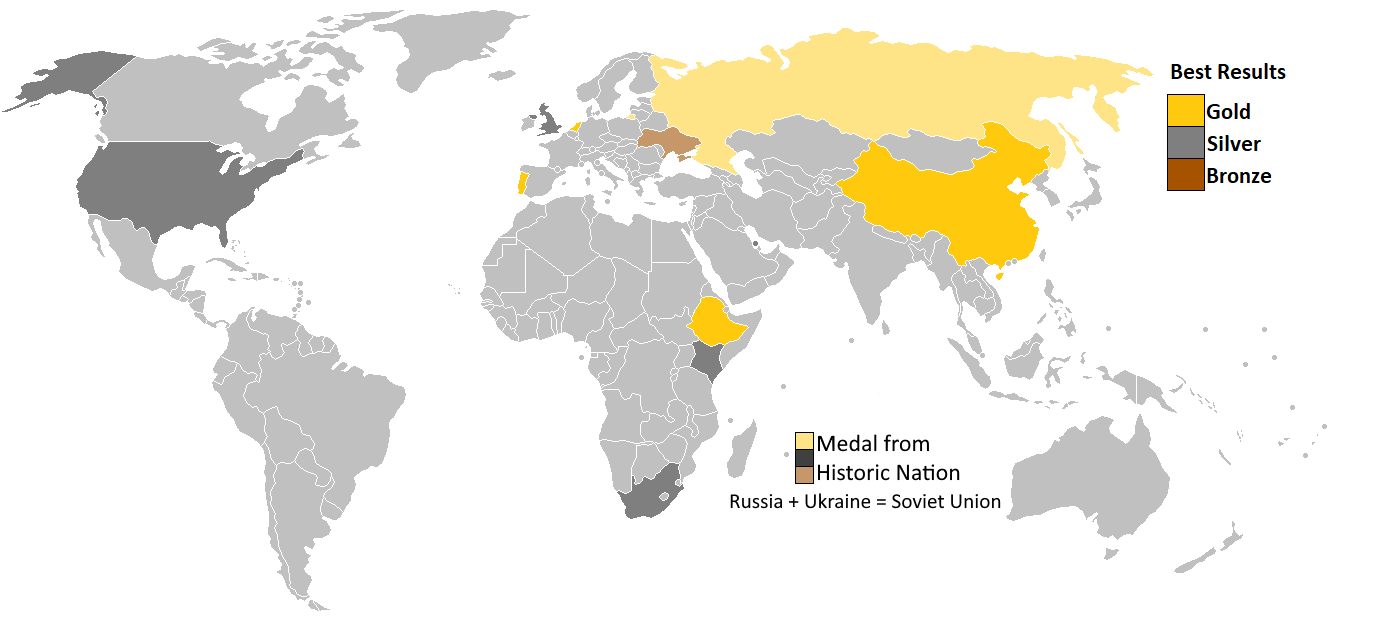
Map of countries' best results - Women's 10,000 metres

Rank	Nation	Gold	Silver	Bronze	Total
1	Ethiopia	5	2	4	11
2	Kenya	1	2	2	5
3	China	1	1	0	2
4	Netherlands	1	0	1	2
4	Portugal	1	0	1	2
4	Soviet Union	1	0	1	2
7	United States	0	1	1	2
8	Bahrain	0	1	0	1
8	Great Britain	0	1	0	1
8	Italy	0	1	0	1
8	South Africa	0	1	0	1
Totals (11 entries)		10	10	10	30

== Five miles ==
=== Intercalated Games ===
The 1906 Intercalated Games were held in Athens and at the time were officially recognised as part of the Olympic Games series, with the intention being to hold a games in Greece in two-year intervals between the internationally held Olympics. However, this plan never came to fruition and the International Olympic Committee (IOC) later decided not to recognise these games as part of the official Olympic series. Some sports historians continue to treat the results of these games as part of the Olympic canon.

At this event a men's five-mile race was held – the first time a long-distance event featured at an Olympic competition. A British runner, Henry Hawtrey, won the event. Two 1908 Olympic participants for Sweden, John Svanberg and Edward Dahl, were the minor medalists.

Games	Gold	Silver	Bronze
1906 Athens	Henry Hawtrey (GBR)	John Svanberg (SWE)	Edward Dahl (SWE)

=== 1908 Olympics ===
Games	Gold	Silver	Bronze
1908 London	Emil Voigt (GBR)	Edward Owen (GBR)	John Svanberg (SWE)
