= List of flag bearers for Ethiopia at the Olympics =

Ethiopia at the Olympics
- IOC code: ETH
- NOC: Ethiopian Olympic Committee
- Website: www.ethiolympic.org
- Medals: Gold 24 Silver 15 Bronze 23 Total 62

Summer appearances
- 1956; 1960; 1964; 1968; 1972; 1976; 1980; 1984–1988; 1992; 1996; 2000; 2004; 2008; 2012; 2016; 2020; 2024

Winter appearances
- 2006; 2010; 2014–2026

This is a list of flag bearers who have represented Ethiopia at the Olympics.

Flag bearers carry the national flag of their country at the opening ceremony of the Olympic Games.

#	Event year	Season	Flag bearer	Sport	Ref.
1	1964	Summer	Abebe Bikila	Athletics	
2	1968	Summer	Abebe Bikila	Athletics	
3	1972	Summer	Mamo Wolde	Athletics	
4	1996	Summer	Fita Bayisa	Athletics	
5	2000	Summer	Derartu Tulu	Athletics	
6	2004	Summer	Abel Aferalign	Boxing	
7	2006	Winter	Robel Teklemariam	Cross-country skiing	
8	2008	Summer	Miruts Yifter	Athletics	
9	2010	Winter	Robel Teklemariam	Cross-country skiing	
10	2012	Summer	Yanet Seyoum	Swimming	
11	2016	Summer	Tsgabu Grmay	Cycling	
12	2020	Summer	Abdelmalik Muktar	Swimming	
13	2024	Summer	Lina Alemayehu Selo	Swimming	
13	2024	Summer	Misgana Wakuma	Athletics	

== See also ==
- Ethiopia at the Olympics
