= Ethiopia at the Olympics =

- IOC code: ETH
- NOC: Ethiopian Olympic Committee
- Medals Ranked 41st: Gold 24 Silver 16 Bronze 22 Total 62

Summer appearances
- 1956; 1960; 1964; 1968; 1972; 1976; 1980; 1984–1988; 1992; 1996; 2000; 2004; 2008; 2012; 2016; 2020; 2024; 2028

Winter appearances
- 2006; 2010; 2014–2026

Ethiopia made its Olympic debut at the 1956 Summer Olympics in Melbourne and has since become one of the most prominent nations in Olympic athletics. The country has participated in every Summer Olympic Games since its debut, with the exception of the 1976 Montreal, 1984 Los Angeles and 1988 Seoul Games, which it boycotted along with several other African nations due to political reasons. Twenty-nine countries boycotted the 1976 Games due to the refusal of the IOC to ban New Zealand, after the New Zealand national rugby union team had toured South Africa earlier in 1976. Ethiopia joined the 1984 Soviet-led Boycott and stated that the step was taken because the United States uses the games 'for purely political purposes against socialist and progressive states'. Along with that, the Ethiopian Olympic Committee expressed a resolute protest in connection with the British government's refusal to cancel England's rugby union tour to South Africa with their racist-ruled apartheid system.

Ethiopia's Olympic achievements are overwhelmingly concentrated in track and field events, particularly in middle- and long-distance running, where it has established itself as a global powerhouse. Ethiopian runners have consistently dominated events ranging from the 800 metres to the marathon.

Ethiopian athletes have won a total of 62 medals, all at the Summer Olympics and all in athletics. Ethiopia participated in the Winter Olympic Games in 2006 and 2010, one of the few African and tropical countries to do so.

Ethiopia's participation in the Olympics is organized by the Ethiopian Olympic Committee, founded in 1948 and recognized by the International Olympic Committee in 1954.

== Medal tables ==
=== Medals by Summer Games ===
Games	Athletes	Gold	Silver	Bronze	Total	Rank
(Australia) 1956 Melbourne	12	0	0	0	0	–
(Italy) 1960 Rome	10	1	0	0	1	21
(Japan) 1964 Tokyo	12	1	0	0	1	24
1968 Mexico City	18	1	1	0	2	25
(West Germany) 1972 Munich	31	0	0	2	2	41
(Canada) 1976 Montreal	boycotted					
(Soviet Union) 1980 Moscow	45	2	0	2	4	17
(United States) 1984 Los Angeles	boycotted					
(South Korea) 1988 Seoul	boycotted					
(Spain) 1992 Barcelona	20	1	0	2	3	33
(United States) 1996 Atlanta	18	2	0	1	3	34
(Australia) 2000 Sydney	26	4	1	3	8	20
(Greece) 2004 Athens	26	2	3	2	7	28
(China) 2008 Beijing	27	4	2	1	7	18
(United Kingdom) 2012 London	35	3	3	2	8	23
(Brazil) 2016 Rio de Janeiro	35	1	2	5	8	44
(Japan) 2020 Tokyo	38	1	1	2	4	56
(France) 2024 Paris	38	1	3	0	4	47
(United States) 2028 Los Angeles	future event					
(Australia) 2032 Brisbane	future event					
Total (15/30)	391	24	16	22	62	41

=== Medals by Winter Games ===
Games	Athletes	Gold	Silver	Bronze	Total	Rank
(Italy) 2006 Turin	1	0	0	0	0	–
(Canada) 2010 Vancouver	1	0	0	0	0	–
2014–2026	did not participate					
(France) 2030 French Alps	future event					
(United States) 2034 Utah	future event					
Total (2/24)	2	0	0	0	0	–

=== Medals by summer sport ===
Sport	Gold	Silver	Bronze	Total
Athletics	24	16	22	62
Totals (1 entries)	24	16	22	62

== List of medalists ==
Medal	Name	Games	Sport	Event
Gold	Abebe Bikila	1960 Rome	Athletics	Men's marathon (WR)
Gold	Abebe Bikila	1964 Tokyo	Athletics	Men's marathon (WR)
Gold	Mamo Wolde	1968 Mexico City	Athletics	Men's marathon
Silver	Mamo Wolde	1968 Mexico City	Athletics	Men's 10,000 m
Bronze	Mamo Wolde	1972 Munich	Athletics	Men's marathon
Bronze	Miruts Yifter	1972 Munich	Athletics	Men's 10,000 m (WR)
Gold	Miruts Yifter	1980 Moscow	Athletics	Men's 5000 m
Gold	Miruts Yifter	1980 Moscow	Athletics	Men's 10,000 m
Bronze	Mohamed Kedir	1980 Moscow	Athletics	Men's 10,000 m
Bronze	Eshetu Tura	1980 Moscow	Athletics	Men's 3000 m steeplechase
Gold	Derartu Tulu	1992 Barcelona	Athletics	Women's 10,000 m
Bronze	Addis Abebe	1992 Barcelona	Athletics	Men's 10,000 m
Bronze	Fita Bayisa	1992 Barcelona	Athletics	Men's 5000 m
Gold	Haile Gebrselassie	1996 Atlanta	Athletics	Men's 10,000 m (OR)
Gold	Fatuma Roba	1996 Atlanta	Athletics	Women's marathon
Bronze	Gete Wami	1996 Atlanta	Athletics	Women's 10,000 m
Gold	Gezahegne Abera	2000 Sydney	Athletics	Men's marathon
Gold	Haile Gebrselassie	2000 Sydney	Athletics	Men's 10,000 m
Gold	Derartu Tulu	2000 Sydney	Athletics	Women's 10,000 m (OR)
Gold	Million Wolde	2000 Sydney	Athletics	Men's 5000 m
Silver	Gete Wami	2000 Sydney	Athletics	Women's 10,000 m
Bronze	Assefa Mezgebu	2000 Sydney	Athletics	Men's 10,000 m
Bronze	Tesfaye Tola	2000 Sydney	Athletics	Men's marathon
Bronze	Gete Wami	2000 Sydney	Athletics	Women's 5000 m
Gold	Kenenisa Bekele	2004 Athens	Athletics	Men's 10,000 m (OR)
Gold	Meseret Defar	2004 Athens	Athletics	Women's 5000 m
Silver	Kenenisa Bekele	2004 Athens	Athletics	Men's 5000 m
Silver	Ejegayehu Dibaba	2004 Athens	Athletics	Women's 10,000 m
Silver	Sileshi Sihine	2004 Athens	Athletics	Men's 10,000 m
Bronze	Tirunesh Dibaba	2004 Athens	Athletics	Women's 5000 m
Bronze	Derartu Tulu	2004 Athens	Athletics	Women's 10,000 m
Gold	Kenenisa Bekele	2008 Beijing	Athletics	Men's 10,000 m (OR)
Gold	Kenenisa Bekele	2008 Beijing	Athletics	Men's 5000 m (OR)
Gold	Tirunesh Dibaba	2008 Beijing	Athletics	Women's 10,000 m (OR)
Gold	Tirunesh Dibaba	2008 Beijing	Athletics	Women's 5000 m
Silver	Sileshi Sihine	2008 Beijing	Athletics	Men's 10,000 m
Silver	Meseret Defar	2008 Beijing	Athletics	Women's 5000 m
Bronze	Tsegay Kebede	2008 Beijing	Athletics	Men's marathon
Gold	Meseret Defar	2012 London	Athletics	Women's 5000 m
Gold	Tirunesh Dibaba	2012 London	Athletics	Women's 10,000 m
Gold	Tiki Gelana	2012 London	Athletics	Women's marathon (OR)
Silver	Dejen Gebremeskel	2012 London	Athletics	Men's 5000 m
Silver	Sofia Assefa	2012 London	Athletics	Women's 3000 m steeplechase
Silver	Abeba Aregawi	2012 London	Athletics	Women's 1500 m
Bronze	Tariku Bekele	2012 London	Athletics	Men's 10,000 m
Bronze	Tirunesh Dibaba	2012 London	Athletics	Women's 5000 m
Gold	Almaz Ayana	2016 Rio de Janeiro	Athletics	Women's 10,000 m (WR)
Silver	Genzebe Dibaba	2016 Rio de Janeiro	Athletics	Women's 1500 m
Silver	Feyisa Lilesa	2016 Rio de Janeiro	Athletics	Men's marathon
Bronze	Tamirat Tola	2016 Rio de Janeiro	Athletics	Men's 10,000 m
Bronze	Mare Dibaba	2016 Rio de Janeiro	Athletics	Women's marathon
Bronze	Almaz Ayana	2016 Rio de Janeiro	Athletics	Women's 5000 m
Bronze	Hagos Gebrhiwet	2016 Rio de Janeiro	Athletics	Men's 5000 m
Bronze	Tirunesh Dibaba	2016 Rio de Janeiro	Athletics	Women's 10,000 m
Gold	Selemon Barega	2020 Tokyo	Athletics	Men's 10,000 m
Silver	Lamecha Girma	2020 Tokyo	Athletics	Men's 3000 m steeplechase
Bronze	Gudaf Tsegay	2020 Tokyo	Athletics	Women's 5000 m
Bronze	Letesenbet Gidey	2020 Tokyo	Athletics	Women's 10,000 m
Gold	Tamirat Tola	2024 Paris	Athletics	Men's marathon (OR)
Silver	Tsige Duguma	2024 Paris	Athletics	Women's 800 m
Silver	Berihu Aregawi	2024 Paris	Athletics	Men's 10,000 m
Silver	Tigist Assefa	2024 Paris	Athletics	Women's marathon

== Multiple medalists ==
Sorted by number of golds won, followed by number of silver medals and bronze medals.

Rank	Athlete	Sport	Years	Games	Sex	Gold	Silver	Bronze	Total
1	Kenenisa Bekele	Athletics	2004–2008	Summer	M	3	1	0	4
2	Tirunesh Dibaba	Athletics	2004–2016	Summer	F	3	0	3	6
3	Meseret Defar	Athletics	2004–2012	Summer	F	2	1	0	3
4	Miruts Yifter	Athletics	1972–1980	Summer	M	2	0	1	3
4	Derartu Tulu	Athletics	1992–2004	Summer	F	2	0	1	3
6	Abebe Bikila	Athletics	1960–1964	Summer	M	2	0	0	2
6	Haile Gebrselassie	Athletics	1996–2000	Summer	M	2	0	0	2
8	Mamo Wolde	Athletics	1968–1972	Summer	M	1	1	1	3
9	Almaz Ayana	Athletics	2016	Summer	F	1	0	1	2
9	Tamirat Tola	Athletics	2016–2024	Summer	M	1	0	1	2
11	Sileshi Sihine	Athletics	2004–2008	Summer	M	0	2	0	2
12	Gete Wami	Athletics	1996–2000	Summer	F	0	1	2	3

== See also ==
- List of flag bearers for Ethiopia at the Olympics
- Category:Olympic competitors for Ethiopia
- Ethiopia at the Paralympics
- Tropical nations at the Winter Olympics
