= List of Ethiopian records in swimming =

The Ethiopian records in swimming are the fastest ever performances of swimmers from Ethiopia, which are recognised and ratified by the Ethiopian Swimming Federation.

All records were set in finals unless noted otherwise.

== Long Course (50 m) ==
=== Men ===
Event	Time		Name	Club	Date	Meet	Location	Ref
50 m freestyle	26.65	h	Abdelmalik Muktar	Ethiopia	30 July 2021	Olympic Games	Tokyo, Japan	
100 m freestyle	1:01.36	h	Dawit Mengistu	Ethiopia	8 September 2015	All-Africa Games	Brazzaville, Republic of the Congo	
200 m freestyle								
400 m freestyle								
800 m freestyle								
1500 m freestyle								
50 m backstroke	33.65	h	Asfaw Surafel	Ethiopia	11 March 2024	African Games	Accra, Ghana	
100 m backstroke								
200 m backstroke								
50 m breaststroke	34.88	h	Henok Lochaber	Ethiopia	21 August 2019	African Games	Casablanca, Morocco	
100 m breaststroke								
200 m breaststroke								
50 m butterfly	29.40	h, †	Achala Gekabel	Ethiopia	26 July 2019	World Championships	Gwangju, South Korea	
100 m butterfly	1:06.40	h	Achala Gekabel	Ethiopia	26 July 2019	World Championships	Gwangju, South Korea	
200 m butterfly								
200 m individual medley								
400 m individual medley								
4×100 m freestyle relay	4:22.53	h	Garkebo Bereket (1:04.83); Haftu Betselote (1:05.94); Gekabel Achala (1:05.69); Asfaw Surafel (1:06.07)	Ethiopia	12 March 2024	African Games	Accra, Ghana	
4×200 m freestyle relay								
4×100 m medley relay								

Legend: # – Record awaiting ratification by Ethiopian Swimming Federation; WR – World record; AF – African record;
Records not set in finals: h – heat; sf – semifinal; r – relay 1st leg; rh – relay heat 1st leg; b – B final; † – en route to final mark; so – swim-off; tt – time trial

=== Women ===
Event	Time		Name	Club	Date	Meet	Location	Ref
50 m freestyle	31.87	h	Selo Alemayehu	Ethiopia	13 March 2024	African Games	Accra, Ghana	
100 m freestyle	1:13.79	r	Selo Alemayehu	Ethiopia	12 March 2024	African Games	Accra, Ghana	
200 m freestyle								
400 m freestyle								
800 m freestyle								
1500 m freestyle								
50 m backstroke								
100 m backstroke								
200 m backstroke								
50 m breaststroke	42.14	h	Berhane Amare	Ethiopia	21 August 2019	African Games	Casablanca, Morocco	
100 m breaststroke	1:34.46		Berhane Amare	Ethiopia	22 August 2019	African Games	Casablanca, Morocco	
200 m breaststroke								
50 m butterfly	33.97	h	Rahel Gebresilassie	Ethiopia	7 September 2015	African Games	Brazzaville, Republic of the Congo	
100 m butterfly								
200 m butterfly								
200 m individual medley								
400 m individual medley								
4×100 m freestyle relay	5:18.96		Selo Alemayehu (1:13.79); Aboye Feven (1:23.71); Kuma Kidst (1:23.03); Berhane Amare (1:18.43)	Ethiopia	12 March 2024	African Games	Accra, Ghana	
4×200 m freestyle relay								
4×100 m medley relay								

Legend: # – Record awaiting ratification by Ethiopian Swimming Federation; WR – World record; AF – African record;
Records not set in finals: h – heat; sf – semifinal; r – relay 1st leg; rh – relay heat 1st leg; b – B final; † – en route to final mark; so – swim-off; tt – time trial

== Short Course (25 m) ==
=== Men ===
Event	Time		Name	Club	Date	Meet	Location	Ref
50 m freestyle	27.98	h	Achala Gekabel	Ethiopia	18 December 2021	World Championships	Abu Dhabi, United Arab Emirates	
100 m freestyle	1:07.48	h	Tilahun Malede	Ethiopia	20 December 2021	World Championships	Abu Dhabi, United Arab Emirates	
200 m freestyle								
400 m freestyle								
800 m freestyle								
1500 m freestyle								
50 m backstroke	31.99	h	Belete Fiseha Hailu	Ethiopia	17 December 2010	World Championships	Dubai, United Arab Emirates	
100 m backstroke								
200 m backstroke								
50m breaststroke	36.02	h	Abdelmalik Muktar	Ethiopia	15 December 2018	World Championships	Hangzhou, China	
100 m breaststroke								
200 m breaststroke								
50m butterfly	29.22	h	Achala Gekabel	Ethiopia	14 December 2018	World Championships	Hangzhou, China	
100m butterfly	1:06.82	h	Achala Gekabel	Ethiopia	12 December 2018	World Championships	Hangzhou, China	
200 m butterfly								
100 m individual medley								
200 m individual medley								
400 m individual medley								
4×50 m freestyle relay								
4×100 m freestyle relay								
4×200 m freestyle relay								
4×50 m medley relay								
4×100 m medley relay								

Legend: # – Record awaiting ratification by Ethiopian Swimming Federation; WR – World record; AF – African record;
Records not set in finals: h – heat; sf – semifinal; r – relay 1st leg; rh – relay heat 1st leg; b – B final; † – en route to final mark; so – swim-off; tt – time trial

=== Women ===
Event	Time		Name	Club	Date	Meet	Location	Ref
50m freestyle	32.87	h	Yanet Seyoum	Ethiopia	18 December 2010	World Championships	Dubai, United Arab Emirates	
100 m freestyle								
200 m freestyle								
400 m freestyle								
800 m freestyle								
1500 m freestyle								
50m backstroke	37.77	h	Yanet Seyoum	Ethiopia	18 December 2010	World Championships	Dubai, United Arab Emirates	
100 m backstroke								
200 m backstroke								
50 m breaststroke								
100 m breaststroke								
200 m breaststroke								
50m butterfly	37.98	h	Lina Selo	Ethiopia	13 December 2018	World Championships	Hangzhou, China	
100 m butterfly								
200 m butterfly								
100 m individual medley								
200 m individual medley								
400 m individual medley								
4×50 m freestyle relay								
4×100 m freestyle relay								
4×200 m freestyle relay								
4×50 m medley relay								
4×100 m medley relay								

Legend: # – Record awaiting ratification by Ethiopian Swimming Federation; WR – World record; AF – African record;
Records not set in finals: h – heat; sf – semifinal; r – relay 1st leg; rh – relay heat 1st leg; b – B final; † – en route to final mark; so – swim-off; tt – time trial
