= Athletics at the 2008 Summer Olympics – Women's 10,000 metres =

Women's 10,000 metres at the Games of the XXIX Olympiad
- Venue: Beijing National Stadium
- Dates: 15 August
- Competitors: 29 from 18 nations
- Winning time: 29:54.66 OR

Medalists
1st place, gold medalist(s)		Tirunesh Dibaba	Ethiopia
2nd place, silver medalist(s)		Shalane Flanagan	United States
3rd place, bronze medalist(s)		Linet Masai	Kenya

The women's 10,000 metres at the 2008 Summer Olympics took place on 15 August at the Beijing National Stadium. The race was won by Tirunesh Dibaba of Ethiopia, who set a new Olympic record time of 29:54.66.

The qualifying standards were 31:45.00 (A standard) and 32:20.00 (B standard).

The early part of the race was dominated by Lornah Kiplagat. But in the second half of the race, the contenders moved to the front, dominated by Elvan Abeylegesse, with the string of runners lined up behind her. Abeylegesse separated herself from the rest of the field, except for Tirunesh Dibaba, who marked her every step. Midway through the last lap, Dibaba pounced with a kick Abeylegesse couldn't answer. Almost a half a minute back, Shalane Flanagan was the best of the rest for bronze, with Linet Chepkwemoi Masai setting the World junior record a few steps behind her.

At the time Dibaba and Abeylegesse ran the second and third fastest of all time (the best having occurred also in Beijing, Junxia Wang's world record in 1993). A year after this race, Meselech Melkamu edged past these two for the second best of all time.

On 29 March 2017, IAAF confirmed that Abeylegesse had tested positive for a banned substance at the 2007 World Championships in Athletics, and that her results from 2007 to 2009, including her Olympic silvers, had been expunged.

== Records ==
Prior to this competition, the existing world record, Olympic record, and world leading time were as follows:

World record	Wang Junxia (CHN)	29:31.78	Beijing, China	8 September 1993
Olympic record	Derartu Tulu (ETH)	30:17.49	Sydney, Australia	30 September 2000
World Leading	Shalane Flanagan (USA)	30:34.49	Palo Alto, United States	4 May 2008

The following new Olympic record was set during this competition.

Date	Event	Name	Nationality	Time	OR	WR
15 August	Final	Tirunesh Dibaba	Ethiopia	29:54.66	OR	

Both Tirunesh Dibaba and Elvan Abeylegesse completed the race in a time under the old Olympic record, recording the second and third fastest ever women's 10,000 metre times, making Dibaba the new Olympic record holder.

== Results ==
Rank	Name	Nationality	Result	Notes
1st place, gold medalist(s)	Tirunesh Dibaba	Ethiopia	29:54.66	OR, AR
2nd place, silver medalist(s)	Shalane Flanagan	United States	30:22.22	AR
3rd place, bronze medalist(s)	Linet Chepkwemoi Masai	Kenya	30:26.50	WJR, NR
4	Mariya Konovalova	Russia	30:35.84	PB
5	Lucy Kabuu Wangui	Kenya	30:39.96	PB
6	Lornah Kiplagat	Netherlands	30:40.27	SB
7	Kimberley Smith	New Zealand	30:51.00	
8	Kara Goucher	United States	30:55.16	PB
9	Kayoko Fukushi	Japan	31:01.14	SB
10	Joanne Pavey	Great Britain	31:12.30	PB
11	Sabrina Mockenhaupt	Germany	31:14.21	PB
12	Ejegayehu Dibaba	Ethiopia	31:22.18	
13	Hilda Kibet	Netherlands	31:29.69	
14	Zhang Yingying	China	31:31.12	SB
15	Yoko Shibui	Japan	31:31:13	
16	Penninah Arusei	Kenya	31:39.87	
17	Tatyana Khmeleva-Aryasova	Russia	31:45.57	
18	Yukiko Akaba	Japan	32:00.37	
19	Bai Xue	China	32:20.27	
20	Anikó Kálovics	Hungary	32:24.83	
21	Kate Reed	Great Britain	32:26.69	
22	Nathalie De Vos	Belgium	32:33.45	SB
23	Preeja Sreedharan	India	32:34.64	
24	Amy Yoder Begley	United States	32:38.28	
25	Dulce María Rodríguez	Mexico	32:58.04	
26	Dong Xiaoqin	China	33:03.14	
27	Isabel Checa	Spain	33:17.88	
	Mestawet Tufa	Ethiopia	DNF	
	Asmae Leghzaoui	Morocco	DNF	
	Nataliya Berkut	Ukraine	DNS	
DSQ	Elvan Abeylegesse	Turkey	~~29:56.34.~~	Doping Violation
DSQ	Inga Abitova	Russia	~~30:37.33~~	Doping Violation

AR area record | CR championship record | GR games record | NR national record | OR Olympic record | PB personal best | SB season best | WL world leading (in a given season)
DNS = did not start | DQ = disqualification | NM = no mark (i.e. no valid result) | Q = qualification by place in heat | q = qualification by overall place

=== Splits ===
Intermediate	Athlete	Country	Mark
1000m	Lornah Kiplagat	Netherlands	3:00.46
2000m	Lornah Kiplagat	Netherlands	6:00.15
3000m	Lornah Kiplagat	Netherlands	9:03.83
4000m	Lornah Kiplagat	Netherlands	12:06.60
5000m	Lornah Kiplagat	Netherlands	15:09.98
6000m	Lornah Kiplagat	Netherlands	18:12.85
7000m	Elvan Abeylegesse	Turkey	21:14.46
8000m	Elvan Abeylegesse	Turkey	24:09.40
9000m	Elvan Abeylegesse	Turkey	27:06.02
