= Ethiopia at the 2006 Winter Olympics =

- IOC code: ETH
- NOC: Ethiopian Olympic Committee
- Website: www.ethiolympic.org

in Turin
- Competitors: 1 in 1 sport
- Flag bearers: Robel Teklemariam (opening and closing)
- Medals: Gold 0 Silver 0 Bronze 0 Total 0

Winter Olympics appearances (overview)
- 2006; 2010; 2014–2022; 2026

Ethiopia competed in the 2006 Winter Olympics in Turin, Italy. The country's participation at the Games marked its Winter Olympics debut, although it had competed in the Summer Olympics since the 1956 Games. The delegation consisted of a single cross-country skier, Robel Teklemariam, who did not win any medals. Teklemariam would later return for his country at the 2010 Winter Olympics.

== Background ==
Ethiopia first competed in the Summer Olympics at the 1956 Games in Melbourne, Australia. They participated on 10 occasions prior to the 2006 Winter Olympics, where they made their Winter Olympics debut in Turin, Italy. They sent a single cross-country skier, Robel Teklemariam.

Teklemariam was born in Addis Ababa, before he left Ethiopia with his family at the age of nine. When he arrived in the United States, he was introduced to skiing while at school in Lake Placid. After leaving full-time education, he decided that he wanted to compete internationally in the sport.

In seeking to compete at the Winter Olympics, he set up the Ethiopian National Skiing Federation with his three brothers so that the sport could be recognised in the country. Teklemariam explained in interviews prior to the Games that he hoped his appearance would inspire other Ethiopians living in colder climates to take up sports. He suggested that cross-country skiing could be a sport that Ethiopians could naturally be proficient at, since it was an endurance sport.

== Cross-country skiing ==
The sole Ethiopian athlete at the Games, Robel Teklemariam, competed in the men's 15 kilometres (9.3 mi) classical. He was the flag bearer at both the opening and closing ceremonies. He was banned for five days prior to the Olympics after tests showed he had abnormally high haemoglobin levels in his blood, but was cleared after a second test, and was allowed to compete.

Competing on the 17 February, he finished the 15 kilometres (9.3 mi) race in a time of 47 minutes and 53.8 seconds, placing him in 83rd place out of the 96 skiers who finished the run. This was nearly ten minutes slower than the gold medallist, Andrus Veerpalu of Estonia (38 minutes and 1.3 seconds). Teklemariam finished faster than the only other African competing, Kenya's Philip Boit (53 minutes and 32.4 seconds). Teklemariam later returned to compete once again for Ethiopia at the 2010 Winter Olympics in Vancouver, British Columbia, Canada.

Cross-country skiing

Athlete	Event	Final	
Athlete	Event	Total	Rank
Robel Teklemariam	Men's 15 km classical	47:53.8	83
