= Ethiopia at the 2010 Winter Olympics =

- IOC code: ETH
- NOC: Ethiopian Olympic Committee
- Website: www.ethiolympic.org

in Vancouver
- Competitors: 1 in 1 sport
- Flag bearer: Robel Teklemariam
- Medals: Gold 0 Silver 0 Bronze 0 Total 0

Winter Olympics appearances (overview)
- 2006; 2010; 2014–2022; 2026

Ethiopia sent a delegation to compete at the 2010 Winter Olympics in Vancouver, British Columbia, Canada from 12–28 February 2010. Ethiopia was making its second appearance in a Winter Olympics, and like four years prior, the only athlete sent to compete was cross-country skier Robel Teklemariam. Teklemariam finished 93rd in the 15 kilometre freestyle event.

Vancouver 2010 marked the first time the Ethiopian Olympic team competed in Canada as Ethiopia and other nations boycotted the 1976 Summer Olympics in Montreal due to the IOC's refusal to ban New Zealand.

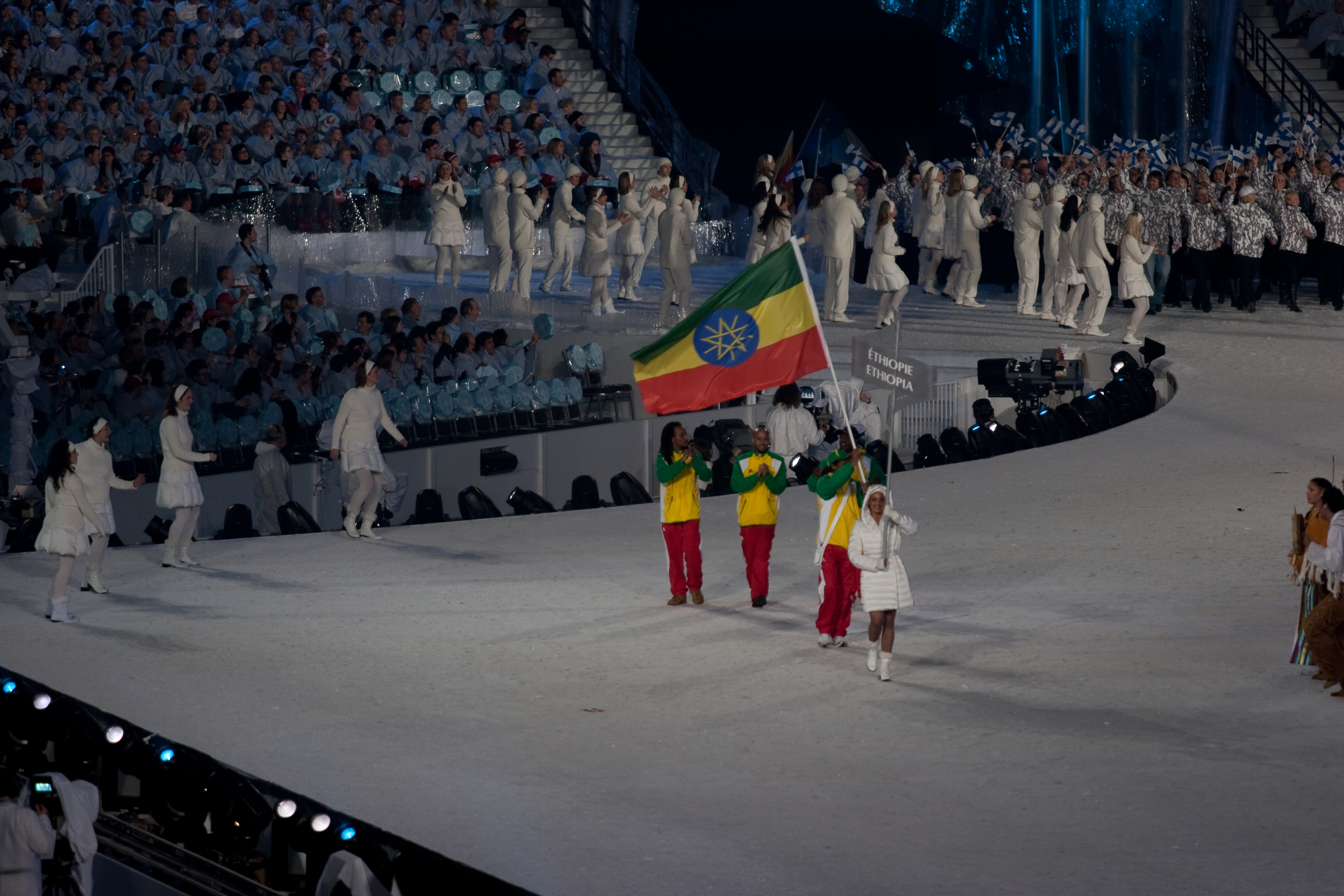
The delegation entering the stadium during the opening ceremonies.

== Background ==
Ethiopia first competed in the Summer Olympics at the 1956 Games in Melbourne, Australia. With the exceptions of 1976, 1984, and 1988, the nation has competed in every Summer Olympics since then. Ethiopia made their debut at the Winter Olympic Games four years prior, at the 2006 Winter Olympics in Turin, Italy. Like the Turin Olympics, cross-country skier Robel Teklemariam was the only athlete Ethiopia sent to the Vancouver Olympics. Teklemariam had finished 84th in the Turin Olympics. He was born in Ethiopia, but took up skiing while living in Lake Placid, New York, United States; before returning to Ethiopia and being a part of establishing the Ethiopian Ski Association. Teklemariam was chosen as the flag bearer for both the opening ceremony and the closing ceremony.

== Cross-country skiing ==
Robel Teklemariam was 35 years old at the time of the Vancouver Olympics. He trained for the Olympics by roller skiing in the streets of Addis Ababa. He said his goal for the Vancouver Games was "to improve on his performance from Italy and to inspire young Ethiopians to follow in his ski tracks." He was entered into a single event, the 15 kilometre freestyle. In the race, held on 15 February 2010, he finished with a time of 45 minutes and 18 seconds, nearly 12 minutes off the gold-medal winning time. He finished in 93rd place, out of 95 competitors who finished the race.

Athlete	Event	Final		
Athlete	Event	Time	Deficit	Rank
Robel Teklemariam	15 kilometre freestyle	45:18.9	11:42.6	93
