= Robel Kiros Habte =

Ethiopian swimmer (born 1992)

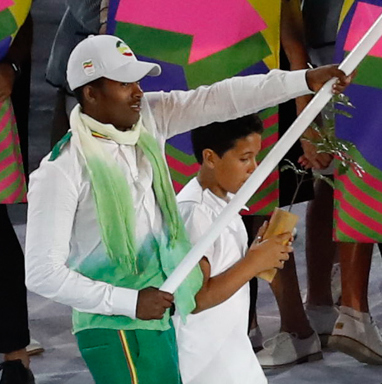
- Habte at the 2016 Olympics

Personal information
- Nationality: Ethiopian
- Born: 13 April 1992 (age 34) Adama, Ethiopia
- Height: 176 cm (5 ft 9 in)
- Weight: 81 kg (179 lb)

Sport
- Sport: Swimming
- Strokes: Freestyle

Robel Kiros Habte (born 13 April 1992 in Adama, Ethiopia) is an Ethiopian swimmer. He holds the Ethiopian championship records in a 100m butterfly, 50m, and 100m freestyle. He represented Ethiopia in competitions held in Morocco, Singapore, Qatar, Mozambique, Spain, Russia and Brazil, from youth Olympic games to Olympics. He competed in the 100-metre freestyle event at the 2016 Summer Olympics. He served as the flag bearer for Ethiopia at the 2016 Summer Olympics Parade of Nations. To his dismay, Habte was ridiculed by some for allegedly having an "unathletic paunch."

== Career best times ==
Event	Time	Record	Meet
Long course
50 m freestyle	27.48	NR	2013 World Aquatics Championships
100 m freestyle	1:04.95		2016 Summer Olympics
Short course
50 m freestyle	27.99	NR	2014 FINA World Swimming Championships

Olympic Games
Preceded by Yanet Seyoum	Flagbearer for Ethiopia; Rio de Janeiro 2016	Succeeded by Abdelmalik Muktar
