= Ethiopia at the 2016 Summer Olympics =

- IOC code: ETH
- NOC: Ethiopian Olympic Committee

in Rio de Janeiro
- Competitors: 38 in 3 sports
- Flag bearer: Robel Kiros Habte
- Medals Ranked 44th: Gold 1 Silver 2 Bronze 5 Total 8

Summer Olympics appearances (overview)
- 1956; 1960; 1964; 1968; 1972; 1976; 1980; 1984–1988; 1992; 1996; 2000; 2004; 2008; 2012; 2016; 2020; 2024

Ethiopia competed at the 2016 Summer Olympics in Rio de Janeiro, from 5 to 21 August 2016. The country's participation in Rio de Janeiro marked its thirteenth appearance at the Summer Olympics since its debut in 1956, having missed three occasions for joining the African (1976), Soviet (1984), and North Korean (1988) boycotts.

The Ethiopian Olympic Committee (EOC) confirmed a team of 38 athletes, 18 men and 20 women, to compete only in track and field, swimming, and road cycling (the country's Olympic return from a 24-year absence) at the Games. The nation's full roster also achieved a historic milestone, as the number of female athletes outnumbered the men for the first time.

Eleven Ethiopian athletes previously competed in London, with only three of them having won medals, including two-time defending champion Tirunesh Dibaba in the women's 10,000 metres, steeplechaser Sofia Assefa, and long-distance runner Dejen Gebremeskel (men's 5000 metres). Other notable athletes on the Ethiopian team featured Dibaba's younger sister and current world record holder Genzebe in middle-distance running, reigning world champions Mare Dibaba (women's marathon) and Almaz Ayana, and freestyle swimmer Robel Kiros Habte, who was appointed as the nation's flag bearer at the opening ceremony and eventually acknowledged internet fame for his portly build and slow qualifying time.

Ethiopia left Rio de Janeiro with a total of eight medals (1 gold, 2 silver, 5 bronze), matching its overall tally from the 2000 Summer Olympics in Sydney. Among the nation's medalists were Ayana, who overturned a long-standing world record to become an Olympic champion in the women's 10,000 metres, and Feyisa Lilesa, who flaunted an anti-government gesture upon finishing second in the men's marathon. Ayana's predecessor Dibaba witnessed her three-peat bid come to an end with a bronze-medal finish in her pet event, while Genzebe followed her elder sister's Olympic legacy by earning a silver in the women's 1500 metres.

== Medalists ==
| Medal | Name | Sport | Event | Date |
|---|---|---|---|---|
| Gold | Almaz Ayana | Athletics | Women's 10,000 m | 12 August |
| Silver | Genzebe Dibaba | Athletics | Women's 1500 m | 16 August |
| Silver | Feyisa Lilesa | Athletics | Men's marathon | 21 August |
| Bronze | Tirunesh Dibaba | Athletics | Women's 10,000 m | 12 August |
| Bronze | Tamirat Tola | Athletics | Men's 10,000 m | 13 August |
| Bronze | Mare Dibaba | Athletics | Women's marathon | 14 August |
| Bronze | Almaz Ayana | Athletics | Women's 5000 m | 20 August |
| Bronze | Hagos Gebrhiwet | Athletics | Men's 5000 m | 20 August |

== Athletics (track and field) ==
Ethiopian athletes have so far achieved qualifying standards in the following athletics events (up to a maximum of 3 athletes in each event):

Following the end of the qualifying period on 11 July, a total of 35 track and field athletes (16 men and 19 women) were officially named to the Ethiopian roster for the Games, with Tirunesh Dibaba looking to defend her Olympic title for the third consecutive time in the women's 10,000 metres. Apart from Dibaba, notable athletes also featured London 2012 silver medalist Dejen Gebremeskel (men's 5000 metres), double Worlds long-distance champion Almaz Ayana, and middle-distance aces Mohammed Aman and Tirunesh's sister Genzebe Dibaba.

Key

- Note–Ranks given for track events are within the athlete's heat only
- Q = Qualified for the next round
- q = Qualified for the next round as a fastest loser or, in field events, by position without achieving the qualifying target
- NR = National record
- N/A = Round not applicable for the event
- Bye = Athlete not required to compete in round
- NM = No mark

Track & road events
Men

| Athlete | Event | Heat | | Semifinal | | Final | |
| Athlete | Event | Result | Rank | Result | Rank | Result | Rank |
|---|---|---|---|---|---|---|---|
| Mohammed Aman | 800 m | 1:48.33 | 2 Q | 1:46.14 | 8 | Did not advance | |
| Mekonnen Gebremedhin | 1500 m | 3:47.33 | 5 Q | 3:40.69 | 7 | Did not advance | |
| Dawit Wolde | 1500 m | 3:39.29 | 10 q | 3:41.42 | 10 | Did not advance | |
| Aman Wote | 1500 m | DNS | | Did not advance | | | |
| Muktar Edris | 5000 m | 13:19.65 | 2 Q | — | | DSQ | |
| Dejen Gebremeskel | 5000 m | 13:19.67 | 3 Q | — | | 13:51.91 | 12 |
| Hagos Gebrhiwet | 5000 m | 13:24.65 | 1 Q | — | | 13:04.35 | 3rd place, bronze medalist(s) |
| Yigrem Demelash | 10000 m | — | | | | 27:06.27 | 4 |
| Abadi Hadis | 10000 m | — | | | | 27:26.34 | 15 |
| Tamirat Tola | 10000 m | — | | | | 27:06.26 | 3rd place, bronze medalist(s) |
| Hailemariyam Amare | 3000 m steeplechase | 8:35.01 | 8 | — | | Did not advance | |
| Chala Beyo | 3000 m steeplechase | 8:32.06 | 7 | — | | Did not advance | |
| Tafese Seboka | 3000 m steeplechase | DSQ | | — | | Did not advance | |
| Tesfaye Abera | Marathon | — | | | | DNF | |
| Lemi Berhanu | Marathon | — | | | | 2:13:29 | 13 |
| Feyisa Lelisa | Marathon | — | | | | 2:09:54 | 2nd place, silver medalist(s) |

Women

| Athlete | Event | Heat | | Semifinal | | Final | |
| Athlete | Event | Result | Rank | Result | Rank | Result | Rank |
|---|---|---|---|---|---|---|---|
| Habitam Alemu | 800 m | 1:58.99 | 3 q | 2:00.07 | 6 | Did not advance | |
| Tigist Assefa | 800 m | 2:00.21 | 5 | Did not advance | | | |
| Gudaf Tsegay | 800 m | 2:00.13 | 4 | Did not advance | | | |
| Genzebe Dibaba | 1500 m | 4:10.61 | 1 Q | 4:03.06 | 1 Q | 4:10.27 | 2nd place, silver medalist(s) |
| Besu Sado | 1500 m | 4:08.11 | 6 Q | 4:05.19 | 4 Q | 4:13.58 | 9 |
| Dawit Seyaum | 1500 m | 4:05.33 | 1 Q | 4:04.23 | 2 Q | 4:13.14 | 8 |
| Almaz Ayana | 5000 m | 15:04.35 | 1 Q | — | | 14:33.59 | 3rd place, bronze medalist(s) |
| Senbere Teferi | 5000 m | 15:17.43 | 2 Q | — | | 14:43.75 | 5 |
| Ababel Yeshaneh | 5000 m | 15:24.38 | 8 q | — | | 15:18.26 | 14 |
| Almaz Ayana | 10000 m | — | | | | 29:17.45 WR | 1st place, gold medalist(s) |
| Gelete Burka | 10000 m | — | | | | 30:26.66 | 8 |
| Tirunesh Dibaba | 10000 m | — | | | | 29:42.56 | 3rd place, bronze medalist(s) |
| Sofia Assefa | 3000 m steeplechase | 9:18.75 | 2 Q | — | | 9:17.15 | 5 |
| Hiwot Ayalew | 3000 m steeplechase | 9:35.09 | 7 | — | | Did not advance | |
| Etenesh Diro | 3000 m steeplechase | 9:34.70 | 7 q | — | | 9:38.77 | 15 |
| Mare Dibaba | Marathon | — | | | | 2:24:30 | 3rd place, bronze medalist(s) |
| Tirfi Tsegaye | Marathon | — | | | | 2:24:47 | 4 |
| Tigist Tufa | Marathon | — | | | | DNF | |
| Yehualeye Beletew | 20 km walk | — | | | | DSQ | |
| Askale Tiksa | 20 km walk | — | | | | 1:44:15 | 61 |

== Cycling ==
=== Road ===
Ethiopia has qualified one rider in the men's Olympic road race by virtue of being ranked in the top two NOCs at the 2015 African Championships, signifying the nation's Olympic comeback in the sport for the first time since 1992.

| Athlete | Event | Time | Rank |
|---|---|---|---|
| Tsgabu Grmay | Men's road race | Did not finish | |

== Swimming ==
Ethiopia has received a Universality invitation from FINA to send two swimmers (one male and one female) to the Olympics.

| Athlete | Event | Heat | | Semifinal | | Final | |
| Athlete | Event | Time | Rank | Time | Rank | Time | Rank |
|---|---|---|---|---|---|---|---|
| Robel Kiros Habte | Men's 100 m freestyle | 1:04.95 | 59 | Did not advance | | | |
| Rahel Gebresilassie | Women's 50 m freestyle | 32.51 | 75 | Did not advance | | | |
