= Hinkelien Schreuder =

Dutch swimmer (born 1984)

Personal information
- Full name: Hinkelien Schreuder
- Nationality: Netherlands
- Born: 13 February 1984 (age 42) Goor, Netherlands
- Height: 1.78 m (5 ft 10 in)
- Weight: 61 kg (134 lb)

Sport
- Sport: Swimming
- Strokes: freestyle, backstroke, butterfly
- Club: Nationaal Zweminstituut Eindhoven
Medal record
Women's swimming
Representing Netherlands
Event	1st	2nd	3rd
Olympic Games	1	1	0
World Championships (LC)	1	0	0
World Championships (SC)	3	3	1
European Championships (LC)	0	3	1
European Championships (SC)	16	5	5
Total	21	12	7
Olympic Games
Gold medal – first place	2008 Beijing	4×100 m freestyle
Silver medal – second place	2012 London	4×100 m freestyle
World Championships (LC)
Gold medal – first place	2009 Rome	4×100 m freestyle
World Championships (SC)
Gold medal – first place	2006 Shanghai	4×100 m freestyle
Gold medal – first place	2008 Manchester	4×100 m freestyle
Gold medal – first place	2010 Dubai	4×100 m freestyle
Silver medal – second place	2008 Manchester	50 m freestyle
Silver medal – second place	2008 Manchester	50 m butterfly
Silver medal – second place	2010 Dubai	50 m freestyle
Bronze medal – third place	2010 Dubai	100 m medley
European Championships (LC)
Silver medal – second place	2008 Eindhoven	50 m freestyle
Silver medal – second place	2010 Budapest	50 m freestyle
Silver medal – second place	2012 Debrecen	50 m freestyle
Bronze medal – third place	2008 Eindhoven	4×100 m medley
European Championships (SC)
Gold medal – first place	2003 Dublin	4×50 m freestyle
Gold medal – first place	2004 Vienna	4×50 m freestyle
Gold medal – first place	2004 Vienna	4×50 m medley
Gold medal – first place	2005 Trieste	4×50 m freestyle
Gold medal – first place	2005 Trieste	4×50 m medley
Gold medal – first place	2007 Debrecen	4×50 m freestyle
Gold medal – first place	2008 Rijeka	50 m butterfly
Gold medal – first place	2008 Rijeka	4×50 m freestyle
Gold medal – first place	2008 Rijeka	4×50 m medley
Gold medal – first place	2009 Istanbul	50 m freestyle
Gold medal – first place	2009 Istanbul	50 m butterfly
Gold medal – first place	2009 Istanbul	100 m medley
Gold medal – first place	2009 Istanbul	4×50 m freestyle
Gold medal – first place	2009 Istanbul	4×50 m medley
Gold medal – first place	2010 Eindhoven	4×50 m freestyle
Gold medal – first place	2010 Eindhoven	4×50 m medley
Silver medal – second place	2001 Antwerp	4×50 m freestyle
Silver medal – second place	2008 Rijeka	50 m freestyle
Silver medal – second place	2010 Eindhoven	50 m freestyle
Silver medal – second place	2010 Eindhoven	50 m butterfly
Silver medal – second place	2010 Eindhoven	100 m medley
Bronze medal – third place	2003 Dublin	4×50 m medley
Bronze medal – third place	2004 Vienna	50 m freestyle
Bronze medal – third place	2005 Trieste	100 m medley
Bronze medal – third place	2007 Debrecen	50 m freestyle
Bronze medal – third place	2007 Debrecen	50 m butterfly

Hinkelien Schreuder (born 13 February 1984) is a former butterfly, freestyle and backstroke swimmer from The Netherlands, who also competed in the medley events. Schreuder won the Olympic gold medal in the 4×100 freestyle relay at the 2008 Olympics in Beijing, and a silver in the same event at the 2012 Summer Olympics. She is a former world record holder in the 100 m individual medley, and former European record holder in the 50 m butterfly short course.

She has set a total of nine individual and relay world records in her career.

== Personal bests ==
Short course
Event	Time	Date	Location
50 m freestyle	23.72	2008-12-14	Rijeka, Croatia
100 m freestyle	52.88	2008-12-19	Amsterdam, Netherlands
50 m backstroke	former NR 26.32	2009-12-12	Istanbul, Turkey
100 m backstroke	former NR 58.64	2008-12-21	Amsterdam, Netherlands
200 m backstroke	2:10.29	2005-12-18	Amsterdam, Netherlands
50 m butterfly	former ER 25.21	2008-12-12	Rijeka, Croatia
100 m butterfly	57.90	2008-12-20	Amsterdam, Netherlands
100 m individual medley	former WR 57.74	2009-11-15	Berlin, Germany

Long course
Event	Time	Date	Location
50 m freestyle	24.45	2008-12-05	Eindhoven, Netherlands
100 m freestyle	54.59	2008-03-19	Eindhoven, Netherlands
50 m backstroke	28.18	2009-04-16	Amsterdam, Netherlands
100 m backstroke	1:02.79	2008-03-20	Eindhoven, Netherlands
50 m butterfly	25.98	2009-04-19	Amsterdam, Netherlands
100 m butterfly	59.40	2008-12-05	Eindhoven, Netherlands

== See also ==
- Dutch records in swimming
- European records in swimming
- List of world records in swimming
