= Ethiopia at the 1996 Summer Olympics =

- IOC code: ETH
- NOC: Ethiopian Olympic Committee

in Atlanta
- Competitors: 18 in 2 sports
- Flag bearer: Fita Bayisa
- Medals Ranked 34th: Gold 2 Silver 0 Bronze 1 Total 3

Summer Olympics appearances (overview)
- 1956; 1960; 1964; 1968; 1972; 1976; 1980; 1984–1988; 1992; 1996; 2000; 2004; 2008; 2012; 2016; 2020; 2024

Ethiopia competed at the 1996 Summer Olympics in Atlanta, United States.

== Medalists ==
Medal	Name	Sport	Event	Date
Gold	Fatuma Roba	Athletics	Women's marathon	28 July
Gold	Haile Gebrselassie	Athletics	Men's 10,000 metres	29 July
Bronze	Gete Wami	Athletics	Women's 10,000 metres	2 August

== Competitors ==
The following is the list of number of competitors in the Games.

Sport	Men	Women	Total
Athletics	8	8	16
Boxing	2	–	2
Total	10	8	18

== Results by event ==
=== Athletics ===
==== Men ====
Track and road events

Athletes	Events	Heat Round 1		Heat Round 2		Semifinal		Final	
Athletes	Events	Time	Rank	Time	Rank	Time	Rank	Time	Rank
Fita Bayissa	5000 metres	13:51.61	1 Q	N/A		13:30.88	7 q	13:18.30	10
Assefa Mezegebu	5000 metres	13:54.89	17 Q	N/A		14:05.48	21	Did not advance	
Abraham Assefa	10000 metres	28:32.24	22	N/A				Did not advance	
Worku Bikila	10000 metres	27:50.57	1 Q	N/A				28:59.15	17
Haile Gebrselassie	10000 metres	28:14.20	11 Q	N/A				27:07.34 OR	Gold medal
Belayneh Dinsamo	Marathon	N/A						Did not finish	
Abebe Mekonnen	Marathon	N/A						2:29:45	81
Tumo Turbo	Marathon	N/A						Did not finish	

==== Women ====
Track and road events

Athletes	Events	Heat Round 1		Heat Round 2		Semifinal		Final	
Athletes	Events	Time	Rank	Time	Rank	Time	Rank	Time	Rank
Kutre Dulecha	800 metres	2:04.80	28	N/A		Did not advance			
Kutre Dulecha	1500 metres	4:07.69	7 q	N/A		4:09.03	13	Did not advance	
Merima Denboba	5000 metres	15:48.35	25	N/A				Did not advance	
Ayelech Worku	5000 metres	15:21.59	7 Q	N/A				15:28.81	12
Luchia Yishak	5000 metres	16:04.29	40	N/A				Did not advance	
Berhane Adere	10000 metres	32:21.09	12 Q	N/A				32:57.35	18
Derartu Tulu	10000 metres	31:35.90	1 Q	N/A				31:10.46	4
Gete Wami	10000 metres	32:20.92	11 Q	N/A				31:06.65	Bronze medal
Fatuma Roba	Marathon	N/A						2:26:05	Gold medal

=== Boxing ===
Athlete	Event	Round of 32	Round of 16	Quarterfinal	Semifinal	Final
Athlete	Event	Opposition Result	Opposition Result	Opposition Result	Opposition Result	Opposition Result
Tebebu Behonegn	Flyweight	Reyes (COL); L 16-2	Did not advance			
Yared Woldemichael	Light-Middleweight	Sinette (TRI); W 11-10	Tulaganov (UZB); L 13-9	Did not advance		

== Sources ==
- Official Olympic Reports
- International Olympic Committee results database
