= Ethiopia at the 2020 Summer Olympics =

- IOC code: ETH
- NOC: Ethiopian Olympic Committee

in Tokyo, Japan July 23, 2021 – August 8, 2021
- Competitors: 38 in 4 sports
- Flag bearer (opening): Abdelmalik Muktar
- Flag bearer (closing): Selemon Barega
- Medals Ranked 56th: Gold 1 Silver 1 Bronze 2 Total 4

Summer Olympics appearances (overview)
- 1956; 1960; 1964; 1968; 1972; 1976; 1980; 1984–1988; 1992; 1996; 2000; 2004; 2008; 2012; 2016; 2020; 2024

Ethiopia competed at the 2020 Summer Olympics in Tokyo. Originally scheduled to take place from 24 July to 9 August 2020, the Games were postponed to 23 July to 8 August 2021, because of the COVID-19 pandemic. The country's participation in Tokyo marked its fourteenth appearance at the Summer Olympics since its debut in 1956, having missed three occasions due to joining the African (1976), Soviet (1984), and North Korean (1988) boycotts. Ethiopia left Tokyo with a total of four medals (1 gold, 1 silver, 2 bronze), a decrease from its previous overall tally at the 2016 Summer Olympics in Rio de Janeiro and its lowest medal count since 1996.

== Medalists ==
Medal	Name	Sport	Event	Date
Gold	Selemon Barega	Athletics	Men's 10000 m	July 30
Silver	Lamecha Girma	Athletics	Men's 3000 m steeplechase	July 30
Bronze	Gudaf Tsegay	Athletics	Women's 5000 m	August 2
Bronze	Letesenbet Gidey	Athletics	Women's 10000 m	August 7

== Competitors ==
The following is the list of number of competitors in the Games.

Sport	Men	Women	Total
Athletics	16	19	35
Cycling	0	1	1
Swimming	1	0	1
Taekwondo	1	0	1
Total	18	20	38

== Athletics ==
Ethiopian athletes further achieved the entry standards, either by qualifying time or by world ranking, in the following track and field events (up to a maximum of 3 athletes in each event):

Key

- Note–Ranks given for track events are within the athlete's heat only
- Q = Qualified for the next round
- q = Qualified for the next round as a fastest loser or, in field events, by position without achieving the qualifying target
- NR = National record
- N/A = Round not applicable for the event
- Bye = Athlete not required to compete in round

Track & road events
Men

Athlete	Event	Heat		Semifinal		Final	
Athlete	Event	Result	Rank	Result	Rank	Result	Rank
Melese Nberet	800 m	1:47.80	7	Did not advance			
Samuel Abate	1500 m	3:41.63	5 Q	3:37.66	11	Did not advance	
Teddese Lemi	1500 m	3:36.26	2 Q	3:34.81	7	Did not advance	
Samuel Tefera	1500 m	3:37.98	9	Did not advance			
Nibret Melak	5000 m	13:45.81	14	—		Did not advance	
Milkesa Mengesha	5000 m	13:31.13	6 Q	—		13:08.50	10
Getnet Wale	5000 m	13:41.13	9	—		Did not advance	
Berihu Aregawi	10000 m	—				27:46.16	4
Selemon Barega	10000 m	—				27:43.22	1st place, gold medalist(s)
Yomif Kejelcha	10000 m	—				27:52.03	8
Lamecha Girma	3000 m steeplechase	8:09.83	1 Q	—		8:10.38	2nd place, silver medalist(s)
Bikila Tadese Takele	3000 m steeplechase	8:24.69	9	—		Did not advance	
Getnet Wale	3000 m steeplechase	8:12.55	2 Q	—		8:14.97	4
Lelisa Desisa	Marathon	—				DNF	
Shura Kitata	Marathon	—				DNF	
Sisay Lemma	Marathon	—				DNF	

Women

Athlete	Event	Heat		Semifinal		Final	
Athlete	Event	Result	Rank	Result	Rank	Result	Rank
Habitam Alemu	800 m	2:01.20	2 Q	1:58.40	2 Q	1:57.56	6
Netsanet Desta	800 m	2:01.98	4	Did not advance			
Freweyni Hailu	1500 m	4:04.12	5 Q	3:57.54	2 Q	3:57.60	4
Lemlem Hailu	1500 m	4:05.49	5 Q	4:03.76	9	Did not advance	
Diribe Welteji	1500 m	4:10.25	12	Did not advance			
Ejgayehu Taye	5000 m	14:48.52	4 Q	—		14:41.24	5
Senbere Teferi	5000 m	14:48.31	3 Q	—		14:45.11	6
Gudaf Tsegay	5000 m	14:55.74	1 Q	—		14:38.87	3rd place, bronze medalist(s)
Tsigie Gebreselama	10000 m	—				DNF	
Tsehay Gemechu	10000 m	—				DSQ	
Letesenbet Gidey	10000 m	—				30:01.72	3rd place, bronze medalist(s)
Mekides Abebe	3000 m steeplechase	9:23.95	3 Q	—		9:06.16	4
Lomi Muleta	3000 m steeplechase	9:45.81	10	—		Did not advance	
Zerfe Wondemagegn	3000 m steeplechase	9:20.01	4 q	—		9:16.41	8
Roza Dereje	Marathon	—				2:28:38	4
Birhane Dibaba	Marathon	—				DNF	
Zeineba Yimer	Marathon	—				DNF	
Yehualeye Beletew	20 km walk	—				DNF	

== Cycling ==
=== Road ===
Ethiopia entered one rider to compete in the women's Olympic road race, by securing an outright berth, as the highest-ranked cyclist, not yet qualified, at the 2019 African Championships in Addis Ababa.

Athlete	Event	Time	Rank
Selam Amha	Women's road race	Did not finish	

== Swimming ==
Ethiopia received a universality invitation from FINA to send a top-ranked male swimmer in his respective individual events to the Olympics, based on the FINA Points System of June 28, 2021.

Athlete	Event	Heat		Semifinal		Final	
Athlete	Event	Time	Rank	Time	Rank	Time	Rank
Abdelmalik Muktar	Men's 50 m freestyle	26.65	62	Did not advance			

== Taekwondo ==
Ethiopia entered one athlete into the taekwondo competition for the first time. Solomon Demse secured a spot in the men's flyweight category (58 kg) with a top two finish at the 2020 African Qualification Tournament in Rabat, Morocco.

Athlete	Event	Round of 16	Quarterfinals	Semifinals	Repechage	Final / BM	
Athlete	Event	Opposition Result	Opposition Result	Opposition Result	Opposition Result	Opposition Result	Rank
Solomon Demse	Men's −58 kg	Suzuki (JPN); W 22–2	Jendoubi (TUN); L 9–32 PTG	Did not advance	Artamonov (ROC); L 5–27 PTG	Did not advance	7
