= Ethiopia at the 1960 Summer Olympics =

- IOC code: ETH (ETI used at these Games)
- NOC: Ethiopian Olympic Committee

in Rome
- Competitors: 10 in 2 sports
- Medals Ranked 21st: Gold 1 Silver 0 Bronze 0 Total 1

Summer Olympics appearances (overview)
- 1956; 1960; 1964; 1968; 1972; 1976; 1980; 1984–1988; 1992; 1996; 2000; 2004; 2008; 2012; 2016; 2020; 2024

Ethiopia competed at the 1960 Summer Olympics in Rome, Italy. Ten competitors, all men, took part in eight events in two sports. Abebe Bikila won the country's first ever Olympic medal by winning the men's marathon.

== Medalists ==
Medal	Name	Sport	Event	Date
Gold	Abebe Bikila	Athletics	Men's marathon	10 September

== Athletics ==
Five male athletes represented Ethiopia in 1960:

Key

- Note–Ranks given for track events are within the athlete's heat only
- Q = Qualified for the next round
- q = Qualified for the next round as a fastest loser or, in field events, by position without achieving the qualifying target
- N/A = Round not applicable for the event
- Bye = Athlete not required to compete in round

Men

Athlete	Event	Heat		Quarterfinal		Semifinal		Final	
Athlete	Event	Result	Rank	Result	Rank	Result	Rank	Result	Rank
Roba Negousse	100 m	11.30	7	Did not advance					
Moussa Said	400 m	48.30	5	Did not advance					
Moussa Said	800 m	1:50.49	6	Did not advance					
Mohamed Saïd	5000 m	14:41.22	18	—				Did not advance	
Mohamed Saïd	10,000 m	—						DNF	—
Abebe Bikila	Marathon	—						2:15:16.2	1st place, gold medalist(s)
Abebe Wakgira	Marathon	—						2:21:09.4	7

== Cycling ==
Five male cyclists represented Ethiopia in 1960.

=== Road ===
Athlete	Event	Time	Rank
Kouflu Alazar	Road race	DNF	—
Guremu Demboba	Road race	DNF	—
Amousse Tessema	Road race	DNF	—
Megra Admassou	Road race	DNF	—

Time trial

Athlete	Event	Time	Rank
Guremu Demboba; Kouflu Alazar; Amousse Tessema; Negousse Mengistou	Time trial	2:38:34.08	28
