= 2010 FINA World Swimming Championships (25 m) – Women's 50 metre freestyle =

Women's 50m Freestyle at the 2010 Short Course Worlds
- Dates: 18 December 2010 (heats and semifinals); 19 December 2010 (final)
- Competitors: 101
- Winning time: 23.37

Medalists
gold medal	Ranomi Kromowidjojo	Netherlands
silver medal	Hinkelien Schreuder	Netherlands
bronze medal	Arianna Vanderpool-Wallace	Bahamas

The Women's 50 Freestyle at the 10th FINA World Swimming Championships (25m) took place 18–19 December 2010 in Dubai, United Arab Emirates. The heats and semifinals were swum 18 December; the final on 19 December.

101 individuals swam this event.

== Records ==
Prior to the competition, the existing world and championship records were as follows.

	Name	Nation	Time	Location	Date
World record Championship record	Marleen Veldhuis	Netherlands	23.25	Manchester	13 April 2008

No new world or competition records were set during this competition.

== Results ==
=== Heats ===
Rank	Heat	Lane	Name	Time	Notes
1	11	6	Li Zhesi (CHN)	24.15	Q
1	12	4	Ranomi Kromowidjojo (NED)	24.15	Q
3	13	4	Hinkelien Schreuder (NED)	24.18	Q
4	13	3	Jessica Hardy (USA)	24.34	Q
5	13	2	Arianna Vanderpool-Wallace (BAH)	24.37	Q
6	11	4	Aleksandra Gerasimenya (BLR)	24.38	Q
7	12	7	Victoria Poon (CAN)	24.39	Q
8	12	5	Amanda Weir (USA)	24.41	Q
9	11	5	Dorothea Brandt (GER)	24.48	Q
10	13	6	Triin Aljand (EST)	24.54	Q
11	12	2	Emma McKeon (AUS)	24.65	Q
12	11	7	Sviatlana Khakhlova (BLR)	24.70	Q
13	11	3	Flavia Delaroli-Cazziolato (BRA)	24.71	Q
14	13	7	Claire Hedenskog (SWE)	24.75	Q
15	12	6	Marieke Guehrer (AUS)	24.77	Q
16	12	1	Theodora Drakou (GRE)	24.78	Q
17	2	3	Jane Trepp (EST)	24.80	
18	12	8	Sze Hang Yu (HKG)	24.84	
19	13	5	Svetlana Fedulova (RUS)	24.89	
20	1	6	Tang Yi (CHN)	24.95	
21	11	2	Aleksandra Urbanczyk (POL)	24.98	
22	13	1	Hanna-Maria Seppälä (FIN)	25.00	
23	11	1	Ragnheiður Ragnarsdóttir (ISL)	25.06	
24	10	7	Pernille Blume (DEN)	25.09	
25	10	5	Ida Marko Varga (SWE)	25.12	
26	13	8	Michelle Lenhardt (BRA)	25.17	
27	11	8	Cecilie Johannessen (NOR)	25.18	
28	9	6	Margarita Nesterova (RUS)	25.29	
29	10	3	Amanda Reaston (CAN)	25.34	
30	10	6	Henriette Brekke (NOR)	25.45	
31	10	1	Renata Fabiola Spagnolo (ITA)	25.49	
32	10	4	Burcu Dolunay (TUR)	25.59	
33	10	8	Alana Kathryn Dillette (BAH)	25.71	
34	9	4	Cherelle Thompson (TRI)	25.77	
35	9	5	Chiara Masini Luccetti (ITA)	25.78	
36	8	4	Jeserik Pinto (VEN)	25.83	
37	9	7	Nicole Horn (ZIM)	25.84	
38	9	1	Melanie Schweiger (SUI)	25.86	
39	10	2	Katarina Filova (SVK)	26.00	
40	9	2	Ximena Vilar (VEN)	26.01	
41	9	3	Nina Sovinek (SLO)	26.02	
42	8	7	Farida Osman (EGY)	26.07	
43	9	8	Miroslava Syllabova (SVK)	26.11	
44	8	6	Kirsten Ann Lapham (ZIM)	26.69	
45	8	3	Magdalene Briedenhann (NAM)	26.82	
46	8	5	Lei On Kei (MAC)	26.85	
47	7	3	Karen Torrez (BOL)	26.94	
48	7	6	Danielle Beaudrun (LCA)	26.97	
49	7	8	Talita Baqlah (JOR)	27.03	
50	7	5	Micaela Cloete (NAM)	27.09	
51	6	4	Marie Laura Meza (CRC)	27.22	
52	8	2	Bayan Jumah (SYR)	27.30	
53	8	8	Talisa Pace (MLT)	27.39	
54	7	7	Planteau de Maroussem (MRI)	27.47	
55	6	2	Massie Milagros Carrillo (PER)	27.49	
56	5	3	Jade Howard (ZAM)	27.50	
57	8	1	Talasha Satish Prabhu (IND)	27.69	
58	7	2	Silvie Ketelaars (AHO)	27.70	
59	6	7	Melinda Sue Micallef (MLT)	27.76	
60	7	4	Tan Chi Yan (MAC)	27.78	
61	7	1	Dalia Torrez (NCA)	27.79	
62	6	6	Shannon Austin (SEY)	27.96	
63	6	5	Zonia Caravantes (GUA)	27.99	
64	5	5	Sylvia Brunlehner (KEN)	28.16	
65	5	4	Judith Ilan Meauri (PNG)	28.23	
66	6	8	Cheyenne Rova (FIJ)	28.33	
67	6	1	Elaine Reyes (GIB)	28.41	
68	6	3	Emily Chan Chee (MRI)	28.42	
69	5	7	Amanda Liew (BRU)	28.56	
70	4	6	Britany van Lange (GUY)	28.58	
71	5	2	Tieri Erasito (FIJ)	28.82	
72	3	4	Danielle Bernadine Findlay (ZAM)	29.10	
73	4	5	Diala Awad (PLE)	29.12	
74	5	1	Celeste Brown (COK)	29.14	
75	4	2	Jamila Lunkuse (UGA)	29.34	
76	4	1	Soraya Oruya (KEN)	29.35	
76	5	6	Ann-Marie Hepler (MHL)	29.35	
78	5	8	Rachel Fortunato (GIB)	29.39	
79	4	4	Michelle Ysrael (GUM)	29.42	
80	4	7	Mariam Foum (TAN)	29.61	
81	3	6	Magdalena Moshi (TAN)	29.74	
82	3	5	Grace Kimball (NMI)	29.93	
83	2	4	Khulan Enkhjargal (MGL)	30.01	
84	4	8	Janina Cruz (GUM)	30.11	
85	3	8	Patricia Cani (ALB)	30.32	
86	4	3	Ledia Kacani (ALB)	30.35	
87	3	2	Mahnoor Maqsood (PAK)	30.80	
88	2	8	Debra Daniel (FSM)	30.91	
89	1	3	Ophelia Swyne (GHA)	30.93	
90	1	4	Katerina Izmaylova (TJK)	31.30	
91	3	7	Osisang Chilton (PLW)	31.55	
92	3	3	Vitiny Hemthon (CAM)	31.65	
93	3	1	Jennet Saryyeva (TKM)	31.94	
94	2	3	Shajan Aminath (MDV)	32.71	
95	2	6	Yanet Seyoum (ETH)	32.87	
96	2	2	Keanna Villagomez (NMI)	32.95	
97	2	5	Shaila Rana (NEP)	33.93	
98	1	5	Angelika Sita Ouedraogo (BUR)	35.19	
99	2	7	Ketty Kamanzi (RWA)	39.29	
100	2	1	Chaemel Morgane Sogbadji (BEN)	40.73	
-	1	2	Samira Vandenbos (CAF)	DSQ	

=== Semifinals ===
Semifinal 1

Rank	Lane	Name	Time	Notes
1	4	Ranomi Kromowidjojo (NED)	23.71	Q
2	5	Jessica Hardy (USA)	24.17	Q
3	2	Triin Aljand (EST)	24.32	Q
4	3	Aleksandra Gerasimenya (BLR)	24.43	
5	6	Amanda Weir (USA)	24.53	
6	7	Sviatlana Khakhlova (BLR)	24.68	
7	8	Theodora Drakou (GRE)	24.69	
8	1	Claire Hedenskog (SWE)	24.94	

Semifinal 2

Rank	Lane	Name	Time	Notes
1	3	Arianna Vanderpool-Wallace (BAH)	24.08	Q
2	4	Li Zhesi (CHN)	24.09	Q
3	5	Hinkelien Schreuder (NED)	24.16	Q
4	2	Dorothea Brandt (GER)	24.27	Q
4	6	Victoria Poon (CAN)	24.40	Q
6	7	Emma McKeon (AUS)	24.41	
7	8	Marieke Guehrer (AUS)	24.42	
8	1	Flavia Delaroli-Cazziolato (BRA)	24.53	

=== Final ===
Rank	Lane	Name	Time	Notes
1st place, gold medalist(s)	4	Ranomi Kromowidjojo (NED)	23.37	
2nd place, silver medalist(s)	6	Hinkelien Schreuder (NED)	23.81	
3rd place, bronze medalist(s)	5	Arianna Vanderpool-Wallace (BAH)	24.04	
4	2	Jessica Hardy (USA)	24.09	
5	1	Triin Aljand (EST)	24.16	
6	3	Li Zhesi (CHN)	24.18	
7	8	Victoria Poon (CAN)	24.19	NR
8	7	Dorothea Brandt (GER)	24.21	
