= Ethiopia at the 1992 Summer Olympics =

- IOC code: ETH
- NOC: Ethiopian Olympic Committee

in Barcelona
- Competitors: 20 (14 men, 6 women) in 2 sports
- Medals Ranked 33rd: Gold 1 Silver 0 Bronze 2 Total 3

Summer Olympics appearances (overview)
- 1956; 1960; 1964; 1968; 1972; 1976; 1980; 1984–1988; 1992; 1996; 2000; 2004; 2008; 2012; 2016; 2020; 2024

Ethiopia competed at the 1992 Summer Olympics in Barcelona, Spain. The nation returned to the Olympic Games after a 12-year absence, having boycotted the 1984 Summer Olympics in Los Angeles, United States and 1988 Summer Olympics in Seoul, South Korea. Twenty competitors, fourteen men and six women, took part in eleven events in two sports.

== Medalists ==
Medal	Name	Sport	Event	Date
Gold	Derartu Tulu	Athletics	Women's 10,000 metres	7 August
Bronze	Addis Abebe	Athletics	Men's 10,000 metres	3 August
Bronze	Fita Bayissa	Athletics	Men's 5000 metres	8 August

== Competitors ==
The following is the list of number of competitors in the Games.

Sport	Men	Women	Total
Athletics	9	6	15
Cycling	5	0	5
Total	14	6	20

== Athletics ==
Men
Track and road events

Athlete	Event	Heats		Quarterfinal		Semifinal		Final	
Athlete	Event	Result	Rank	Result	Rank	Result	Rank	Result	Rank
Metiku Megersa	1500 metres	3:41.54	28	—		Did not advance			
Hailu Zewde	1500 metres	3:47.79	35	—		Did not advance			
Addis Abebe	5000 metres	13:40.76	21	—				Did not advance	
Fita Bayisa	5000 metres	13:31.24	7 Q	—				13:13.03	3rd place, bronze medalist(s)
Worku Bikila	5000 metres	13:32.93	10 Q	—				13:23.52	6
Addis Abebe	10,000 metres	28:15.76	4 Q	—				28:00.07	3rd place, bronze medalist(s)
Fita Bayesa	10,000 metres	28:23.55	10 Q	—				28:27.68	9
Zerehune Gizaw	Marathon	—						2:28:25	61
Abebe Mekonnen	Marathon	—						DNF	
Tena Negere	Marathon	—						2:17:07	23
Shemisu Hassan	20 kilometres walk	—						1:32:39	25

Women
Track and road events

Athlete	Event	Heats		Quarterfinal		Semifinal		Final	
Athlete	Event	Result	Rank	Result	Rank	Result	Rank	Result	Rank
Zewde Hailemariam	800 metres	2:11.60	30	—		Did not advance			
Getenesh Urge	1500 metres	4:18.09	28	—		Did not advance			
Tigist Moreda	10,000 metres	32:14.42	10 Q	—				34:05.56	18
Derartu Tulu	10,000 metres	31:55.67	1 Q	—				31:06.02	1st place, gold medalist(s)
Luchia Yishak	10,000 metres	34:12.16	37	—				Did not advance	
Addis Gezahegn	Marathon	—						2:58:57	30

== Cycling ==
Five male cyclists represented Ethiopia in 1992.

=== Road ===
Men

Athlete	Event	Time	Rank
Biruk Abebe	Road race	DNF	
Asmelash Geyesus	Road race	DNF	
Tekle Hailemikael	Road race	DNF	
Biruk Abebe; Hailu Fana; Asmelash Geyesus; Danial Fesshaye	Team time trial	2:45:43	28
