= Ethiopia at the 2008 Summer Olympics =

- IOC code: ETH
- NOC: Ethiopian Olympic Committee

in Beijing
- Competitors: 27 in 1 sport
- Flag bearers: Miruts Yifter (opening); Kenenisa Bekele (closing)
- Medals Ranked 18th: Gold 4 Silver 2 Bronze 1 Total 7

Summer Olympics appearances (overview)
- 1956; 1960; 1964; 1968; 1972; 1976; 1980; 1984–1988; 1992; 1996; 2000; 2004; 2008; 2012; 2016; 2020; 2024

Ethiopia competed in the 2008 Summer Olympics held in Beijing, People's Republic of China from August 8 to August 24, 2008.

10,000 m runner Tirunesh Dibaba ran the second fastest 10,000 metres of all time, setting an Olympic record of 29 minutes, 54.66 seconds.

== Medalists ==
Medal	Name	Sport	Event
Gold	Tirunesh Dibaba	Athletics	Women's 10000 m
Gold	Tirunesh Dibaba	Athletics	Women's 5000 m
Gold	Kenenisa Bekele	Athletics	Men's 10000 m
Gold	Kenenisa Bekele	Athletics	Men's 5000 m
Silver	Sileshi Sihine	Athletics	Men's 10000 m
Silver	Meseret Defar	Athletics	Women's 5000 m
Bronze	Tsegay Kebede	Athletics	Men's marathon

== Athletics ==
The Ethiopian track and field team was announced on July 13, 2008.

Men

Athlete	Event	Heat		Semifinal		Final	
Athlete	Event	Result	Rank	Result	Rank	Result	Rank
Gashaw Asfaw	Marathon	—				2:10:52	7
Kenenisa Bekele	5000 m	13:40.13	3 Q	—		12:57.82 OR	1st place, gold medalist(s)
Kenenisa Bekele	10000 m	—				27:01.17 OR	1st place, gold medalist(s)
Tariku Bekele	5000 m	13:37.63	3 Q	—		13:19.06	6
Abreham Cherkos	5000 m	13:47.60	3 Q	—		13:16.46	5
Demma Daba	1500 m	3:37.78	8	Did not advance			
Roba Gari	3000 m steeplechase	8:28.27	8	Did not advance			
Haile Gebrselassie	10000 m	—				27:06.68	6
Yacob Jarso	3000 m steeplechase	8:16.88	1 Q	—		8:13.47 NR	4
Tsegay Kebede	Marathon	—				2:10:00	3rd place, bronze medalist(s)
Deresse Mekonnen	1500 m	3:36.22	5 Q	3:37.85	6	Did not advance	
Deriba Merga	Marathon	—				2:10:21	4
Nahom Mesfin	3000 m steeplechase	8:23.82	5	Did not advance			
Sileshi Sihine	10000 m	—				27:02.77	2nd place, silver medalist(s)
Mulugeta Wendimu	1500 m	3:36.67	7 q	3:40.16	10	Did not advance	

Women

Athlete	Event	Heat		Final	
Athlete	Event	Result	Rank	Result	Rank
Berhane Adere	Marathon	—		DNF	
Zemzem Ahmed	3000 m steeplechase	9:25.63	4 Q	9:17.85 NR	7
Meskerem Assefa	1500 m	4:10.04	10	Did not advance	
Sofia Assefa	3000 m steeplechase	9:47.02	8	Did not advance	
Mekdes Bekele	3000 m steeplechase	9:41.43	9	Did not advance	
Gelete Burka	1500 m	4:15.77	6	Did not advance	
Meseret Defar	5000 m	14:56.32	1 Q	15:44.12	2nd place, silver medalist(s)
Ejegayehu Dibaba	10000 m	—		31:22.18	14
Tirunesh Dibaba	5000 m	15:09.89	1 Q	15:41.40	1st place, gold medalist(s)
Tirunesh Dibaba	10000 m	—		29.54.66 OR	1st place, gold medalist(s)
Meselech Melkamu	5000 m	15:11.21	4 Q	15:49.03	8
Mestawet Tufa	10000 m	—		DNF	
Dire Tune	Marathon	—		2:31:16	15
Gete Wami	Marathon	—		DNF	

Key

- Note–Ranks given for track events are within the athlete's heat only
- Q = Qualified for the next round
- q = Qualified for the next round as a fastest loser or, in field events, by position without achieving the qualifying target
- NR = National record
- N/A = Round not applicable for the event
- Bye = Athlete not required to compete in round
