= Ethiopia at the 1980 Summer Olympics =

- IOC code: ETH
- NOC: Ethiopian Olympic Committee

in Moscow
- Competitors: 41 (39 men, 2 women) in 3 sports
- Medals Ranked 17th: Gold 2 Silver 0 Bronze 2 Total 4

Summer Olympics appearances (overview)
- 1956; 1960; 1964; 1968; 1972; 1976; 1980; 1984–1988; 1992; 1996; 2000; 2004; 2008; 2012; 2016; 2020; 2024

Ethiopia competed at the 1980 Summer Olympics in Moscow, USSR. The nation returned to the Olympic Games after boycotting the 1976 Summer Olympics in Montreal, Quebec, Canada. 41 competitors, 39 men and 2 women, took part in 26 events in 3 sports.

== Medalists ==
=== Gold ===
- Miruts Yifter – Athletics, Men's 5000 metres
- Miruts Yifter – Athletics, Men's 10000 metres

=== Bronze ===
- Mohamed Kedir – Athletics, Men's 10000 metres
- Eshetu Tura – Athletics, Men's 3000 metres Steeplechase

== Athletics ==
Men's 100 metres

- Besha Tuffa
  - Heat – 11.55 (→ did not advance)

Men's 200 metres

- Besha Tuffa
  - Heat – 23.18 (→ did not advance)

Men's 800 metres

- Abebe Zerihun
  - Heat – 1:50.3 (→ did not advance)
- Nigusse Bekele
  - Heat – 1:51.1 (→ did not advance)
- Atre Bezabeh
  - Heat – 1:52.7 (→ did not advance)

Men's 1,500 metres

- Kassa Balcha
  - Heat – 3:43.1 (→ did not advance)
- Haile Zeru
  - Heat – 3:45.7 (→ did not advance)
- Nigusse Bekele
  - Heat – 3:45.8 (→ did not advance)

Men's 5,000 metres

- Miruts Yifter
  - Heat – 13:44.4
  - Semi Final – 13:40.0
  - Final – 13:21.0 (→ Gold Medal)
- Yohannes Mohamed
  - Heat – 13:45.8
  - Semi Final – 13:39.4
  - Final – 13:28.4 (→ 10th place)
- Mohamed Kedir
  - Heat – 13:42.7
  - Semi Final – 13:28.6
  - Final – 13:34.2 (→ 12th place)

Men's 10,000 metres

- Miruts Yifter
  - Heat – 28:41.7
  - Final – 27:42.7 (→ Gold Medal)
- Mohamed Kedir
  - Heat – 28:16.4
  - Final – 27:44.7 (→ Bronze Medal)
- Tolossa Kotu
  - Heat – 28:55.3
  - Final – 27:46.5 (→ 4th place)

Men's Marathon

- Dereje Nedi
  - Final – 2:12:44 (→ 7th place)
- Moges Alemayehu
  - Final – 2:18:40 (→ 24th place)
- Kebede Balcha
  - Final – did not finish (→ no ranking)

Men's 4x400 metres Relay

- Besha Tuffa, Kumela Fituma, Asfaw Deble, and Atre Bezabeh
  - Heat – 3:18.2 (→ did not advance)

Men's 3,000 m Steeplechase

- Eshetu Tura
  - Heat – 8:23.8
  - Semifinals – 8:16.2
  - Final – 8:13.6 (→ Bronze Medal)
- Hailu Wolde-Tsadik
  - Heat – 8:41.0
  - Semifinals – 8:35.0 (→ did not advance)
- Girma Wolde-Hana
  - Heat – 8:54.6 (→ did not advance)

Men's Long Jump

- Abebe Gessese
  - Qualification – 6.66 m (→ did not advance)

Men's Triple Jump

- Yadessa Kuma
  - Qualification – 13.60 m (→ did not advance)

Men's Javelin Throw

- Milkessa Chalchisa
  - Qualification – 51.04 m (→ did not advance, 18th place)

Men's 20 km Walk

- Tekeste Mitiku
  - Final – 1:45:45.7 (→ 23rd place)

Women's 800 metres

- Fantaye Sirak
  - Heat – 2:08.7 (→ did not advance)

Women's 1,500 metres

- Amsale Woldegibriel
  - Heat – 4:25.3 (→ did not advance)

== Boxing ==
Men's Light Flyweight (– 48 kg)

- Beruk Asfaw
  - First Round – lost to Antti Juntumaa (Finland) after knock-out in first round

Men's Flyweight (– 51 kg)

- Hassen Sherif
  - First Round – Defeated Aguibou Barry (Guinea) after disqualification in second round
  - Second Round – Lost to Petar Lesov (Bulgaria) on points (0–5)

Men's Bantamweight (– 54 kg)

- Ayele Mohammed
  - First Round – Bye
  - Second Round – Defeated Ahmad Nesar (Afghanistan) on points (5–0)
  - Third Round – Lost to Juan Hernández (Cuba) after referee stopped contest in second round

Men's Featherweight (– 57 kg)

- Leoul Neeraio
  - First Round – Bye
  - Second Round – Defeated Ramy Zialor (Seychelles) on points (3–2)
  - Third Round – Lost to Sidnei Dalrovere (Brazil) on points (0–5)

Men's Lightweight (– 60 kg)

- Tadesse Haile
  - First Round – Lost to Florian Livadaru (Romania) after disqualification in third round

Men's Light-Welterweight (– 63,5 kg)

- Ebrahim Saide
  - First Round – Lost to José Angel Molina (Puerto Rico) on points (0–5)

== Cycling ==
Eight cyclists represented Ethiopia in 1980.

Individual road race

- Zeragaber Gebrehiwot
- Jemal Rogora
- Tilahun Woldesenbet
- Musse Yohannes

Team time trial

- Haile Micael Kedir
- Ayele Mekonnen
- Tadesse Mekonnen
- Tilahun Alemayehu
