= Ethiopia at the 1972 Summer Olympics =

- IOC code: ETH
- NOC: Ethiopian Olympic Committee

in Munich
- Competitors: 31 (men) in 3 sports
- Flag bearer: Mamo Wolde (Athletics)
- Medals Ranked 41st: Gold 0 Silver 0 Bronze 2 Total 2

Summer Olympics appearances (overview)
- 1956; 1960; 1964; 1968; 1972; 1976; 1980; 1984–1988; 1992; 1996; 2000; 2004; 2008; 2012; 2016; 2020; 2024

Ethiopia competed at the 1972 Summer Olympics in Munich, West Germany. 31 competitors, all men, took part in 20 events in 3 sports.

== Medalists ==
| Medal | Name | Sport | Event | Date |
|---|---|---|---|---|
| Bronze | Miruts Yifter | Athletics | Men's 10,000 metres | 3 September |
| Bronze | Mamo Wolde | Athletics | Men's marathon | 10 September |

== Athletics ==
Men's 100 metres

- Egzi Gabre-Gabre
  - First Heat – 10.89s (→ did not advance)

Men's 800 metres

- Mulugetta Tadesse
  - Heat – 1:47.1
  - Semifinals – 1:48.9 (→ did not advance)
- Shibrou Regassa
  - Heat – 1:53.3 (→ did not advance)

Men's 1500 metres

- Hailu Ebba
  - Heat – 3:41.6
  - Semifinals – 3:43.7 (→ did not advance)
- Shibrou Regassa
  - Heat – 3:43.6
  - Semifinals – 3:41.9 (→ did not advance)

Men's 5000 metres

- Tolossa Kotu
  - Heat – 13:46.2 (→ did not advance)
- Tekle Fitinsa
  - Heat – 13:50.4 (→ did not advance)

Men's 10,000 metres

- Tadesse Wolde-Medhin
  - Heat – 28:45.4 (→ did not advance)

Men's 4 × 100 m Relay

- Sisaye Feleke, Solomon Belay, Kebede Bedasso, and Egzi Gabre-Gabre
  - Heat – DNF (→ did not advance)

== Boxing ==
Men's Bantamweight (– 54 kg)

- Mohamed Ayele
  - First Round – Lost to Koh Keun-Sang (KOR), KO-1

Men's Featherweight

- Lema Yemane
  - First Round - Lost to Angelos Theotokatos (GRE), 0:5

Men's Lightweight (– 60 kg)

- Girmaye Gabre
  - First Round - Bye
  - Second Round - Lost to Samuel Mbugua (KEN), 0:5

Men's Light Welterweight (– 63.5 kg)

- Fekadu Gabre Selassie
  - First Round – Lost to Kyoji Shinohara (JPN), 0:5

== Cycling ==
Individual road race

- Tekeste Woldu – 53rd place
- Fisihasion Ghebreyesus – did not finish (→ no ranking)
- Rissom Gebre Meskei – did not finish (→ no ranking)
- Suleman Abdul Rahman – did not finish (→ no ranking)

Team time trial

- Mehari Okubamicael
- Rissom Gebre Meskei
- Fisihasion Ghebreyesus
- Tekeste Woldu
