= Ethiopia at the 2012 Summer Olympics =

- IOC code: ETH
- NOC: Ethiopian Olympic Committee

in London
- Competitors: 35 in 2 sports
- Flag bearers: Yanet Seyoum (opening); Tirunesh Dibaba (closing)
- Medals Ranked 23rd: Gold 3 Silver 3 Bronze 2 Total 8

Summer Olympics appearances (overview)
- 1956; 1960; 1964; 1968; 1972; 1976; 1980; 1984–1988; 1992; 1996; 2000; 2004; 2008; 2012; 2016; 2020; 2024; 2028

Ethiopia competed at the 2012 Summer Olympics in London, from 27 July to 12 August 2012. This was the nation's twelfth appearance at the Olympics, having missed three occasions because of the African, Soviet, and North Korean boycott. The Ethiopian Olympic Committee sent a total of 35 athletes to the Games, 18 men and 17 women, to compete only in athletics, specifically in the middle and long-distance running events, and swimming, the nation's Olympic debut.

The Ethiopian team featured the defending Olympic champions, long-distance runners Kenenisa Bekele and Tirunesh Dibaba. Among these champions, Dibaba managed to defend her Olympic title, in the women's 10,000 metres event. Another middle-distance runner Meseret Defar became the second Ethiopian female athlete to regain her title in the women's 5,000 metres event, ahead of her compatriot and defending champion Dibaba, who won only the bronze medal. Tiki Gelana became the second female Ethiopian to win the women's marathon after 16 years. Swimmer Yanet Seyoum was the nation's flag bearer at the opening ceremony.

Ethiopia left London with a total of 7 medals (3 gold, 2 silver, and 2 bronze), sharing the same records with Beijing and Athens, respectively. One more medal was redistributed after the games ended due to doping cases. All gold medals were received only by women for the first time in its history.

== Medalists ==
| Medal | Name | Sport | Event | Date |
|---|---|---|---|---|
| Gold | Tirunesh Dibaba | Athletics | Women's 10,000 m | 3 August |
| Gold | Tiki Gelana | Athletics | Women's marathon | 5 August |
| Gold | Meseret Defar | Athletics | Women's 5000 m | 10 August |
| Silver | Sofia Assefa | Athletics | Women's 3000 m steeplechase | 6 August |
| Silver | Dejen Gebremeskel | Athletics | Men's 5000 m | 11 August |
| Silver | Abeba Aregawi | Athletics | Women's 1500 m | 10 August |
| Bronze | Tariku Bekele | Athletics | Men's 10,000 m | 4 August |
| Bronze | Tirunesh Dibaba | Athletics | Women's 5000 m | 10 August |

== Athletics ==
Ethiopia selected a total of 33 athletes in the track and field after having achieved qualifying standards in their respective events (up to a maximum of 3 athletes in each event at the 'A' Standard, and 1 at the 'B' Standard): Most of them were past Olympic medalists, All-African Games medalists, and winners from last year's world championships. Three of them were defending titleholders including middle-distance runners Kenenisa Bekele, Tirunesh Dibaba, and Meseret Defar.

Ethiopia has won a total of 7 medals, not only in the track and field, but also in the nation's medal standings. Among the defending champions, Dibaba managed to defend her Olympic title only in the women's 10,000 m. Her compatriot, Meseret Defar, however, regained her Olympic title after eight years in Athens, finishing ahead of Dibaba, who was also the defending champion in Beijing. In the men's events, two-time Olympic champion, Kenenisa Bekele, however, did not win an Olympic medal for the first time, when his brother Tariku Bekele edged him out of the podium to claim the bronze medal.

In the women's marathon, Tiki Gelana became the first Ethiopian to win the gold medal since 1996, despite falling behind the other runners during the midway of the race.

Men

| Athlete | Event | Heat | | Semifinal | | Final | |
| Athlete | Event | Result | Rank | Result | Rank | Result | Rank |
|---|---|---|---|---|---|---|---|
| Ayele Abshero | Marathon | —N/a | | | | DNF | |
| Yenew Alamirew | 5000 m | 13:15.39 | 2 Q | —N/a | | 13:49.68 | 12 |
| Mohammed Aman | 800 m | 1:47.34 | 1 Q | 1:44.34 | 1 Q | 1:43.20 | 6 |
| Kenenisa Bekele | 10000 m | —N/a | | | | 27:32.44 | 4 |
| Tariku Bekele | 10000 m | —N/a | | | | 27:31.43 | 3rd place, bronze medalist(s) |
| Bereket Desta | 400 m | 47.40 | 7 | Did not advance | | | |
| Getu Feleke | Marathon | —N/a | | | | DNF | |
| Roba Gari | 3000 m steeplechase | 8:20.68 | 1 Q | —N/a | | 8:20.00 | 4 |
| Gebregziabher Gebremariam | 10000 m | —N/a | | | | 27:36.34 | 8 |
| Mekonnen Gebremedhin | 1500 m | 3:36.56 | 2 Q | 3:42.90 | 4 Q | 3:35.44 | 6 |
| Dejen Gebremeskel | 5000 m | 13:15.15 | 1 Q | —N/a | | 13:41.98 | 2nd place, silver medalist(s) |
| Hagos Gebrhiwet | 5000 m | 13:26.16 | 5 Q | —N/a | | 13:49.59 | 11 |
| Birhan Getahun | 3000 m steeplechase | DNF | | —N/a | | Did not advance | |
| Nahom Mesfin | 3000 m steeplechase | 8:18.16 | 5 q | —N/a | | 8:35.12 | 12 |
| Dino Sefer | Marathon | —N/a | | | | DNF | |
| Dawit Wolde | 1500 m | 3:41.81 | 10 | Did not advance | | | |
| Aman Wote | 1500 m | 3:41.67 | 8 | Did not advance | | | |

Women

| Athlete | Event | Heat | | Semifinal | | Final | |
| Athlete | Event | Result | Rank | Result | Rank | Result | Rank |
|---|---|---|---|---|---|---|---|
| Abeba Aregawi | 1500 m | 4:04.55 | 1 Q | 4:01.03 | 1 Q | 4:11.03 | 2nd place, silver medalist(s) |
| Meskerem Assefa | 1500 m | 4:15.52 | 9 | Did not advance | | | |
| Sofia Assefa | 3000 m steeplechase | 9:25.42 | 1 Q | —N/a | | 9:09.84 | 2nd place, silver medalist(s) |
| Hiwot Ayalew | 3000 m steeplechase | 9:24.01 | 1 Q | —N/a | | 9:12.98 | 5 |
| Gelete Burka | 5000 m | 15:01.44 | 1 Q | —N/a | | 15:10.66 | 5 |
| Meseret Defar | 5000 m | 14:58.70 | 2 Q | —N/a | | 15:04.25 | 1st place, gold medalist(s) |
| Genzebe Dibaba | 1500 m | 4:11.15 | 10 | Did not advance | | | |
| Mare Dibaba | Marathon | —N/a | | | | 2:28:48 | 23 |
| Tirunesh Dibaba | 5000 m | 14:58.48 | 1 Q | —N/a | | 15:05.15 | 3rd place, bronze medalist(s) |
| Tirunesh Dibaba | 10000 m | —N/a | | | | 30:20.75 | 1st place, gold medalist(s) |
| Etenesh Diro | 3000 m steeplechase | 9:25.31 | 2 Q | —N/a | | 9:19.89 | 6 |
| Tiki Gelana | Marathon | —N/a | | | | 2:23:07 | 1st place, gold medalist(s) |
| Werknesh Kidane | 10000 m | —N/a | | | | 30:39.38 | 4 |
| Fantu Magiso | 800 m | DNS | | Did not advance | | | |
| Aselefech Mergia | Marathon | —N/a | | | | 2:32:03 | 42 |
| Belaynesh Oljira | 10000 m | —N/a | | | | 30:45.56 | 5 |

Key

- Note–Ranks given for track events are within the athlete's heat only
- Q = Qualified for the next round
- q = Qualified for the next round as a fastest loser or, in field events, by position without achieving the qualifying target
- NR = National record
- N/A = Round not applicable for the event
- Bye = Athlete not required to compete in round

== Swimming ==
Ethiopia was given two "Universality places" from the FINA. Mulualem Girma Teshale finished farther behind the other swimmers, only in fifty-seventh place, failing him to advance into the semifinals. Yanet Seyoum, the first female Ethiopian swimmer finished sixty-fifth out of 73 swimmers, and also did not advance into the semifinals.

Men

| Athlete | Event | Heat | | Semifinal | | Final | |
| Athlete | Event | Time | Rank | Time | Rank | Time | Rank |
|---|---|---|---|---|---|---|---|
| Mulualem Girma Teshale | 50 m freestyle | 28.99 | 57 | Did not advance | | | |

Women

| Athlete | Event | Heat | | Semifinal | | Final | |
| Athlete | Event | Time | Rank | Time | Rank | Time | Rank |
|---|---|---|---|---|---|---|---|
| Yanet Seyoum | 50 m freestyle | 32.41 | 65 | did not advance | | | |
