= Ethiopia at the 2024 Summer Olympics =

- IOC code: ETH
- NOC: Ethiopian Olympic Committee

in Paris, France 26 July 2024 – 11 August 2024
- Competitors: 34 (16 men and 18 women) in 2 sports
- Flag bearers (opening): Misgana Wakuma; Lina Alemayehu Selo
- Flag bearer (closing): Kenenisa Bekele
- Medals Ranked 47th: Gold 1 Silver 3 Bronze 0 Total 4

Summer Olympics appearances (overview)
- 1956; 1960; 1964; 1968; 1972; 1976; 1980; 1984–1988; 1992; 1996; 2000; 2004; 2008; 2012; 2016; 2020; 2024

Ethiopia competed at the 2024 Summer Olympics in Paris from 26 July to 11 August 2024. Since the nation's official debut in 1956, Ethiopian athletes have appeared in every edition of the Summer Olympic Games, except for three occasions: Montreal 1976 as part of the Congolese-led boycott, Los Angeles 1984 as part of the Soviet boycott, and Seoul 1988 as part of its allegiance in solidarity with North Korea.

== Medalists ==
| Medal | Name | Sport | Event | Date |
|---|---|---|---|---|
| Gold | Tamirat Tola | Athletics | Men's marathon | 10 August |
| Silver | Berihu Aregawi | Athletics | Men's 10000 m | 2 August |
| Silver | Tsige Duguma | Athletics | Women's 800 m | 5 August |
| Silver | Tigst Assefa | Athletics | Women's marathon | 11 August |

Medals by sport
| Sport | 1st place, gold medalist(s) | 2nd place, silver medalist(s) | 3rd place, bronze medalist(s) | Total |
| Athletics | 1 | 3 | 0 | 4 |
| Total | 1 | 3 | 0 | 4 |

Medals by gender
| Gender | 1st place, gold medalist(s) | 2nd place, silver medalist(s) | 3rd place, bronze medalist(s) | Total |
| Male | 1 | 1 | 0 | 2 |
| Female | 0 | 2 | 0 | 2 |
| Mixed | 0 | 0 | 0 | 0 |
| Total | 1 | 3 | 0 | 4 |

Medals by date
| Date | 1st place, gold medalist(s) | 2nd place, silver medalist(s) | 3rd place, bronze medalist(s) | Total |
| 2 August | 0 | 1 | 0 | 1 |
| 5 August | 0 | 1 | 0 | 1 |
| 10 August | 1 | 0 | 0 | 1 |
| 11 August | 0 | 1 | 0 | 1 |
| Total | 1 | 3 | 0 | 4 |

== Competitors ==
The following is the list of number of competitors in the Games.

| Sport | Men | Women | Total |
|---|---|---|---|
| Athletics | 16 | 17 | 33 |
| Swimming | 0 | 1 | 1 |
| Total | 16 | 18 | 34 |

== Athletics ==
Ethiopian track and field athletes achieved the entry standards for Paris 2024, either by passing the direct qualifying mark (or time for track and road races) or by world ranking, in the following events (a maximum of 3 athletes each):

Key

- Note–Ranks given for track events are within the athlete's heat only
- Q = Qualified for the next round
- q = Qualified for the next round as a fastest loser or, in field events, by position without achieving the qualifying target
- NR = National record
- N/A = Round not applicable for the event
- Bye = Athlete not required to compete in round
- DNF = Did Not Finish

Track and road events
Men

| Athlete | Event | Heat | | Repechage | | Semifinal | | Final | |
| Athlete | Event | Result | Rank | Result | Rank | Result | Rank | Result | Rank |
|---|---|---|---|---|---|---|---|---|---|
| Abdisa Fayisa | 1500 m | 3:39.67 | 14 | 3:36.82 | 10 | Did not advance | | | |
| Samuel Tefera | 1500 m | 3:37.34 | 6 Q | Bye | | 3:33.02 | 9 | Did not advance | |
| Ermias Girma | 1500 m | 3:35.21 | 1 Q | Bye | | 3:40.27 | 12 | Did not advance | |
| Hagos Gebrhiwet | 5000 m | 14:08.18 | 2 Q | —N/a | | | | 13:15.32 | 5 |
| Biniam Mehary | 5000 m | 13:51.82 | 2 Q | —N/a | | | | 13:15.99 | 6 |
| Addisu Yihune | 5000 m | 13:52.62 | 8 Q | —N/a | | | | 13:22.33 | 14 |
| Lamecha Girma | 3000 m steeplechase | 8:23.89 | 1 Q | —N/a | | | | DNF | |
| Getnet Wale | 3000 m steeplechase | 8:18.25 | 3 Q | —N/a | | | | 8:12.33 | 9 |
| Samuel Firewu | 3000 m steeplechase | 8:11.61 | 2 Q | —N/a | | | | 8:08.87 | 6 |
| Yomif Kejelcha | 10000 m | —N/a | | | | | | 26:44.02 | 6 |
| Berihu Aregawi | 10000 m | —N/a | | | | | | 26:43.44 | 2nd place, silver medalist(s) |
| Selemon Barega | 10000 m | —N/a | | | | | | 26:44.48 | 7 |
| Kenenisa Bekele | Marathon | —N/a | | | | | | 2:12:24 | 39 |
| Tamirat Tola | Marathon | —N/a | | | | | | 2:06:26 | (gold) OR |
| Deresa Geleta | Marathon | —N/a | | | | | | 2:07:31 | 5 |
| Misgana Wakuma | 20 km walk | —N/a | | | | | | 1:19:31 | 6 |

Women

| Athlete | Event | Heat | | Repechage | | Semifinal | | Final | |
| Athlete | Event | Result | Rank | Result | Rank | Result | Rank | Result | Rank |
|---|---|---|---|---|---|---|---|---|---|
| Worknesh Mesele | 800 m | 1:58.07 PB | 1 Q | Bye | | 1:58.06 | 2 Q | 1:58.28 | 6 |
| Habitam Alemu | 800 m | 2:02.19 | 7 | 2:02.73 | 6 | Did not advance | | | |
| Tsige Duguma | 800 m | 1:57.90 | 1 Q | Bye | | 1:57.47 | 1 Q | 1:57.15 | 2nd place, silver medalist(s) |
| Gudaf Tsegay | 1500 m | 3:58.84 | 1 Q | Bye | | 3:56.41 | 4 Q | 4:01.27 | 12 |
| Diribe Welteji | 1500 m | 3:59.73 | 1 Q | Bye | | 3:55.10 | 1 Q | 3:52.75 PB | 4 |
| Birke Haylom | 1500 m | 4:07.15 | 13 R | 4:01.47 | 1 Q | 4:03.11 | 10 | Did not advance | |
| Gudaf Tsegay | 5000 m | 14:57.84 | 5 Q | —N/a | | | | 14:45.21 | 9 |
| Ejgayehu Taye | 5000 m | 14:57.97 | 6 Q | —N/a | | | | 14:32.98 | 6 |
| Medina Eisa | 5000 m | 15:00.82 | 2 Q | —N/a | | | | 14:35.43 | 7 |
| Sembo Almayew | 3000 m steeplechase | 9:15.42 | 2 Q | —N/a | | | | 9:00.83 | 5 |
| Lomi Muleta | 3000 m steeplechase | 9:10.73 PB | 5 Q | —N/a | | | | 9:06.07 | 8 |
| Gudaf Tsegay | 10000 m | —N/a | | | | | | 30:45.04 | 6 |
| Fotyen Tesfay | 10000 m | —N/a | | | | | | 30:46.93 | 7 |
| Tsigie Gebreselama | 10000 m | —N/a | | | | | | 30:54.57 | 10 |
| Tigst Assefa | Marathon | —N/a | | | | | | 2:22:58 | 2nd place, silver medalist(s) |
| Alemu Megertu | Marathon | —N/a | | | | | | DNF | |
| Amane Beriso | Marathon | —N/a | | | | | | 2:23:57 | 5 |

== Swimming ==
Ethiopia sent one swimmer to compete at the 2024 Paris Olympics.

| Athlete | Event | Heat | | Semifinal | | Final | |
| Athlete | Event | Time | Rank | Time | Rank | Time | Rank |
|---|---|---|---|---|---|---|---|
| Lina Alemayehu Selo | Women's 50 m freestyle | 31.87 | 68 | Did not advance | | | |

Qualifiers for the latter rounds (Q) of all events were decided on a time only basis, therefore positions shown are overall results versus competitors in all heats.
