= Ethiopia at the 2000 Summer Olympics =

- IOC code: ETH
- NOC: Ethiopian Olympic Committee

in Sydney
- Competitors: 26 (15 men and 11 women) in 2 sports
- Flag bearer: Derartu Tulu
- Medals Ranked 20th: Gold 4 Silver 1 Bronze 3 Total 8

Summer Olympics appearances (overview)
- 1956; 1960; 1964; 1968; 1972; 1976; 1980; 1984–1988; 1992; 1996; 2000; 2004; 2008; 2012; 2016; 2020; 2024

Ethiopia competed at the 2000 Summer Olympics in Sydney, Australia. 26 athletes from Ethiopia participated. These Games were the most successful for Ethiopia, as the country claimed four gold medals and eight overall.

== Medalists ==
Medal	Name	Sport	Event	Date
Gold	Haile Gebrselassie	Athletics	Men's 10,000 metres	25 September
Gold	Derartu Tulu	Athletics	Women's 10,000 metres	30 September
Gold	Million Wolde	Athletics	Men's 5000 metres	30 September
Gold	Gezahegne Abera	Athletics	Men's marathon	1 October
Silver	Gete Wami	Athletics	Women's 10,000 metres	30 September
Bronze	Gete Wami	Athletics	Women's 5000 metres	25 September
Bronze	Assefa Mezgebu	Athletics	Men's 10,000 metres	25 September
Bronze	Tesfaye Tola	Athletics	Men's marathon	1 October

Medals by sport
Sport	1st place, gold medalist(s)	2nd place, silver medalist(s)	3rd place, bronze medalist(s)	Total
Athletics	4	1	3	8
Total	4	1	3	8

== Competitors ==
The following is the list of number of competitors in the Games.

Sport	Men	Women	Total
Athletics	13	11	24
Boxing	2	–	2
Total	15	11	26

== Athletics ==
Key

- Note–Ranks given for track events are within the athlete's heat only
- Q = Qualified for the next round
- q = Qualified for the next round as a fastest loser or, in field events, by position without achieving the qualifying target
- NR = National record
- N/A = Round not applicable for the event
- Bye = Athlete not required to compete in round

Men
Track and road events

Athletes	Events	Heat Round 1		Heat Round 2		Semifinal		Final	
Athletes	Events	Time	Rank	Time	Rank	Time	Rank	Time	Rank
Berhanu Alemu	1500 metres	3:38.79	7 Q	—N/a		3:41.09	18	Did not advance	
Hailu Mekonnen	1500 metres	3:39.09	12 Q	—N/a		3:40.92	16	Did not advance	
Daniel Zegeye	1500 metres	3:40.91	23 Q	—N/a		3:38.08	3 Q	3:36.78	6
Dagne Alemu	5000 metres	13:29.93	12 Q	—N/a				13:37.17	6
Fita Bayissa	5000 metres	13:22.92	3 Q	—N/a				13:37.03	4
Million Wolde	5000 metres	13:22.75	2 Q	—N/a				13:35.49	1st place, gold medalist(s)
Haile Gebrselassie	10,000 metres	27:50.01	8 Q	—N/a				27:18.20	1st place, gold medalist(s)
Assefa Mezgebu	10,000 metres	27:50.64	12 Q	—N/a				27:19.75	3rd place, bronze medalist(s)
Girma Tolla	10,000 metres	27:44.01	1 Q	—N/a				27:49.75	11
Gezahegne Abera	Marathon	—N/a						2:10:11	1st place, gold medalist(s)
Simretu Alemayehu	Marathon	—N/a						2:17:21	22
Tesfaye Tola	Marathon	—N/a						2:11:10	3rd place, bronze medalist(s)
Maru Daba	3000 metres steeplechase	8:35.34	25	—N/a				Did not advance	

Women
Track and road events

Athletes	Events	Heat Round 1		Heat Round 2		Semifinal		Final	
Athletes	Events	Time	Rank	Time	Rank	Time	Rank	Time	Rank
Kutre Dulecha	1500 metres	4:09.88	10 Q	—N/a		4:06.78	8 Q	4:05.33	4
Abebech Negussie	1500 metres	4:15.52	33	—N/a		Did not advance			
Hareg Sidelil	1500 metres	4:14.05	32	—N/a		Did not advance			
Werknesh Kidane	5000 metres	15:08.62	3 Q	—N/a				14:47.40	7
Gete Wami	5000 metres	15:08.92	5 Q	—N/a				14:42.23	3rd place, bronze medalist(s)
Ayelech Worku	5000 metres	15:13.26	13 Q	—N/a				14:42.67	4
Berhane Adere	10,000 metres	32:34.62	11 Q	—N/a				31:40.52	12
Derartu Tulu	10,000 metres	32:06.19	1 Q	—N/a				30:17.49 OR	1st place, gold medalist(s)
Gete Wami	10,000 metres	32:34.63	12 Q	—N/a				30:22.48	2nd place, silver medalist(s)
Elfenesh Alemu	Marathon	—N/a						2:26:54	6
Gadissie Edato	Marathon	—N/a						2:42:29	36
Fatuma Roba	Marathon	—N/a						2:27:38	9

== Boxing ==
Men

Athlete	Event	Round of 32	Round of 16	Quarterfinals	Semifinals	Final	
Athlete	Event	Opposition Result	Opposition Result	Opposition Result	Opposition Result	Opposition Result	Rank
Johnny Sheferaw	Featherweight	Bojado (MEX); L RSC-R4	Did not advance				
Adisu Tebebu	Lightweight	Lungu (ROU); L 3-15	Did not advance				
Tsegasellase Aregawi	Welterweight	Did not start					
