= Yanet Seyoum =

Ethiopian swimmer

Personal information
- Full name: Yanet Seyoum Gebremedhin
- National team: Ethiopia
- Born: July 9, 1994 (age 32) Kombolcha, Ethiopia

Sport
- Sport: Swimming
- Strokes: freestyle

Yanet Seyoum Gebremedhin (born 9 July 1994 in Kombolcha, Ethiopia) is an Ethiopian swimmer. She is the first swimmer from Ethiopia to compete in the Olympics. Yanet competed in the 50 meter freestyle at the 2012 Summer Olympics and was the flag bearer of the Ethiopian team at the 2012 Summer Olympics opening ceremony.

== Early life ==
Yanet was born and raised in Kombolcha, Ethiopia. She has an older brother, Yemanebirhan Seyoum Gebremedhin. Her mother, Tsigework Abebe, works for Ethiotelecom and her father is a driver for an aid agency. Yanet's family frequently took leisure trips to the area's only pool. From the age of 12 Yanet was taught how to swim by her father and after winning a silver medal in a local competition she fell in love with the sport. She is studying engineering at Addis Ababa Science and Technology University.

== Career ==
Yanet has won 40 gold, five silver and two bronze medals while competing in Ethiopian swimming competitions. After completing two World Championships, a World Youth Olympics and an All-African Games event in the last three years Yanet qualified for the Olympics from the world short-course championships in Dubai. She trained using the Olympic size swimming pool at the Ghion Hotel in Addis Ababa with the help of her mother and the advice of her coach who called her from Nazret. At the 2012 Summer Olympics 50 meter freestyle Preliminary Rounds she ranked 65 out of 75 with a time of 32.41 s. She did not participate in the 2016 Summer Olympics.

Olympic Games
Preceded by Robel Teklemariam	Flagbearer for Ethiopia; London 2012	Succeeded by Robel Kiros Habte
