= Robel Teklemariam =

Ethiopian cross-country skier

Robel Zeimichael Teklemariam (born September 16, 1974) is an Ethiopian cross-country skier who has competed since 2006. Competing in two Winter Olympics, he earned his best finish of 83rd in the 15 km event at Turin in 2006.

At the FIS Nordic World Ski Championships 2007 in Sapporo, Teklemariam finished 74th in the individual sprint and 104th in the 15 km event.

His best career finish was 25th in a lesser event at 15 km race in Switzerland in January 2010.

Although he has lived in the United States since the age of 9, he has founded and heads the Ethiopian National Skiing Federation, and still speaks fluent Amharic.

He has said that without the financial help of Ethiopians abroad, he would not have made it to February's games in Italy. He also admitted that he had no chance of winning medals in either event he has entered in, Alpine and cross-country skiing. "I'm a realist. My goals are for further down the road. I want this Olympics to open my eyes and hopefully the eyes of other Ethiopians."

Robel Teklemariam has four other brothers. One (Nahom) in Los Angeles and three (Natan, Yoseph, Benyam) in Richmond, Virginia.

He is a 1997 graduate of the University of New Hampshire.

Olympic Games
Preceded by Abel Aferalign	Flagbearer for Ethiopia; Turin 2006	Succeeded by Miruts Yifter
Olympic Games
Preceded by Miruts Yifter	Flagbearer for Ethiopia; Vancouver 2010	Succeeded by Yanet Seyoum
