= Abdelmalik Muktar =

Ethiopian swimmer (born 1996)

Personal information
- Nationality: Ethiopian
- Born: 19 April 1996 (age 29)

Sport
- Sport: Swimming

Abdelmalik Muktar (born 19 April 1996) is an Ethiopian swimmer. He competed in the men's 50 metre freestyle at the 2020 Summer Olympics.

Olympic Games
Preceded by Robel Kiros Habte	Flag bearer for Ethiopia; 2020 Tokyo	Succeeded by Lina Alemayehu Selo; Misgana Wakuma
