= Miruts Yifter =

Ethiopian long-distance runner (1944–2016)

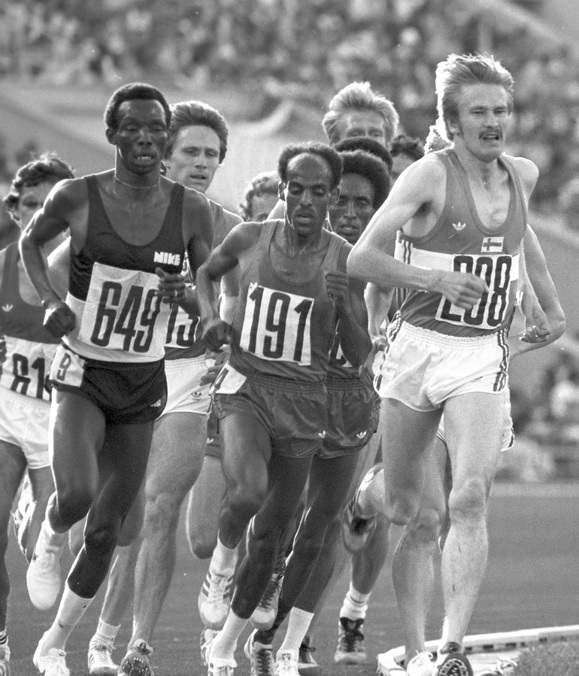
- Miruts (#191) at the 1980 Summer Olympics

Personal information
- Native name: ምሩፅ ይፍጠር
- Nationality: Ethiopian
- Born: 15 May 1944 Zalambessa, Tigray Province, Ethiopian Empire
- Died: 22 December 2016 (aged 72) Toronto, Ontario, Canada

Sport
- Sport: Track
- Events: 5000 m, 10,000 m

Achievements and titles
- Personal bests: 5000 m: 13:13.82; 10,000 m: 27:40.96
Medal record
Men's athletics
Representing Ethiopia
Olympic Games
| Gold medal – first place | 1980 Moscow | 5000 m |
| Gold medal – first place | 1980 Moscow | 10,000 m |
| Bronze medal – third place | 1972 Munich | 10,000 m |
All-Africa Games
| Gold medal – first place | 1973 Lagos | 10,000 m |
| Silver medal – second place | 1973 Lagos | 5000 m |
African Championships
| Gold medal – first place | 1979 Dakar | 5000 m |
| Gold medal – first place | 1979 Dakar | 10,000 m |
Representing Africa
IAAF World Cup
| Gold medal – first place | 1977 Düsseldorf | 5000 m |
| Gold medal – first place | 1977 Düsseldorf | 10,000 m |
| Gold medal – first place | 1979 Montreal | 5000 m |
| Gold medal – first place | 1979 Montreal | 10,000 m |

Miruts Yifter (Amharic and Tigrinya: ምሩፅ ይፍጠር, affectionately known as "Yifter the Shifter", 15 May 1944 – 22 December 2016) was an Ethiopian long-distance runner and winner of two gold medals at the 1980 Summer Olympics. His date of birth is often given as 15 May 1944, though there is some uncertainty about this. His name is also sometimes spelled as Muruse Yefter.

== Early life ==
Born in Zalambessa, Tigray, Ethiopia, Miruts spent the early part of his youth working in different factories and as a carriage driver. His talent as a long-distance runner was noticed when he joined the Ethiopian Air Force.

== Running career ==
Miruts was called to the Ethiopian national team for the 1968 Summer Olympics in Mexico City, but he made his Olympic debut four years later in Munich Olympics where he won a bronze medal in 10,000 metres. However, he arrived too late to compete in the 5,000 metres final.

In the 1973 All-Africa Games he won one gold medal (10,000 m) and one silver (5,000 m). At the 1st African Championships in 1979 he won two gold medals (5,000 and 10,000 metres).

Miruts was unable to participate in the 1976 Summer Olympics because his nation boycotted the event. Four years later in Moscow, Miruts made up for his disappointments by winning gold in both the 10,000 m and 5,000 m events. In the final of the 10,000 m he sprinted into the lead 300 m from the finish and won by ten metres. Five days later, in the 5,000 m final, Miruts was boxed in during the last lap. But with 300 m to go, his Ethiopian teammate, Mohamed Kedir, stepped aside and Miruts again sprinted to victory. Due to his abrupt acceleration when executing his kick towards the finish, Miruts acquired the nickname "Yifter the Shifter."

At Coamo, Puerto Rico on 6 February 1977, Miruts ran a World Best for the half-marathon of 1:02:57.

At the Moscow Olympics, part of the mystery surrounding Miruts was the question of his age, which was reported to be between 33 and 42. Miruts refused to give a definitive answer, telling reporters:

"Men may steal my chickens; men may steal my sheep. But no man can steal my age."

The most common versions of his date of birth are 1 January 1938 or 15 May 1944 (see IAAF Profile).

Miruts continued competing into the early 1980s, running on Ethiopia's gold medal winning team at the 1982 and 1983 IAAF World Cross Country Championships.

== Death ==
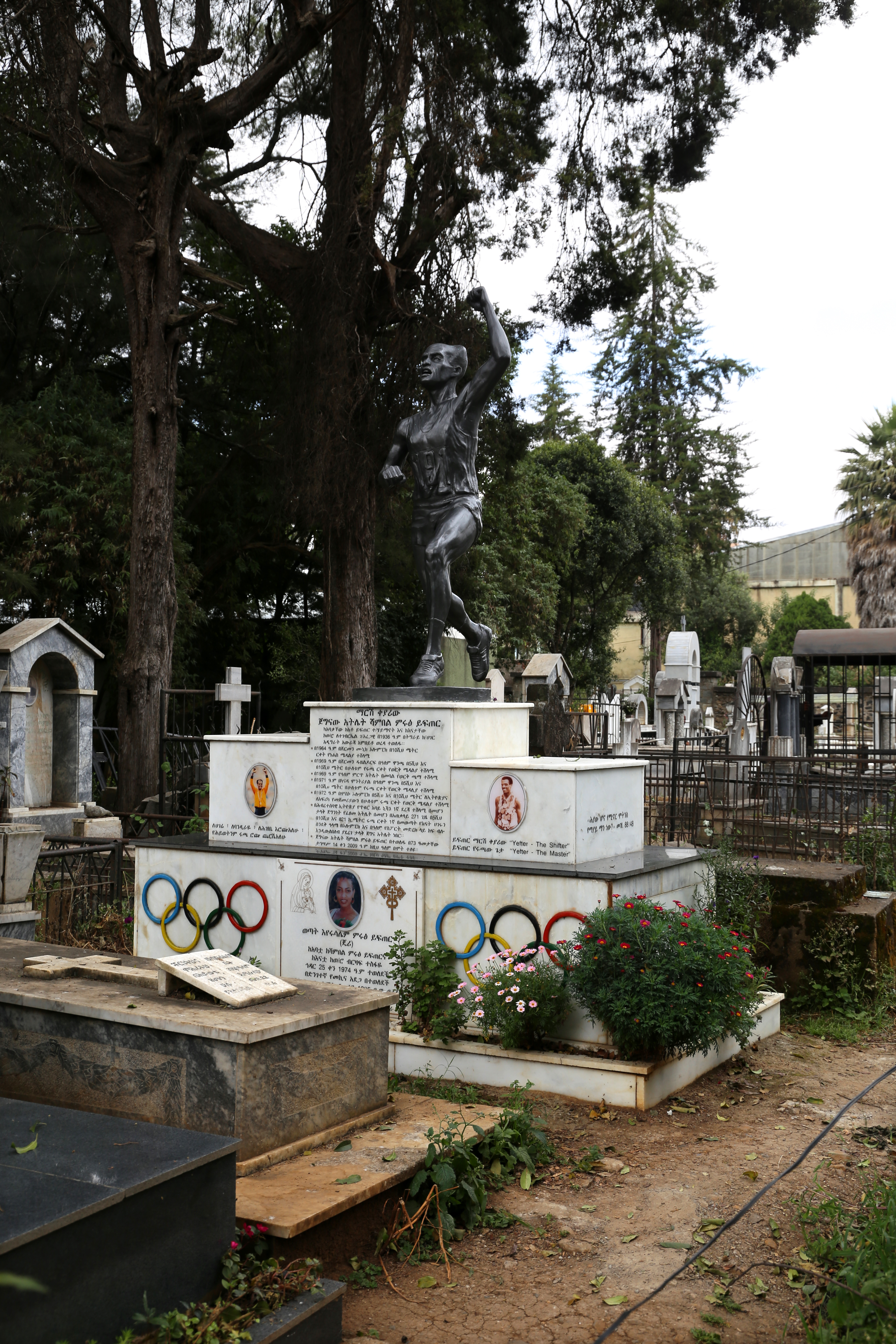
Miruts's grave in the Holy Trinity Cathedral cemetery

Miruts died aged 72 on 22 December 2016 in Toronto, Ontario, where he had lived since 2000. According to family members, he had been suffering from respiratory problems.

He was buried in Addis Ababa, in the Holy Trinity Cathedral cemetery.

He was a father of 7 and grandfather of 9

== International competitions ==
| Year | Competition | Venue | Position | Event | Notes |
Representing Ethiopia
| 1979 | African Championships | Dakar, Senegal | 1st | 5000 m | 14:14.0 |
| 1979 | African Championships | Dakar, Senegal | 1st | 10,000 m | 29:08.0 |

Sporting positions
| Preceded by Juan Rafael Pérez | Men's half marathon best year performance 1977 | Succeeded by Tony Simmons |
| Preceded by Suleiman Nyambui | Men's 5000 m best year performance 1980 | Succeeded by Henry Rono |
Olympic Games
| Preceded by Robel Teklemariam | Flagbearer for Ethiopia; Beijing 2008 | Succeeded by Robel Teklemariam |
