= Derartu Tulu =

Ethiopian former long-distance runner (born 1972)

NL COL Derartu Tulu
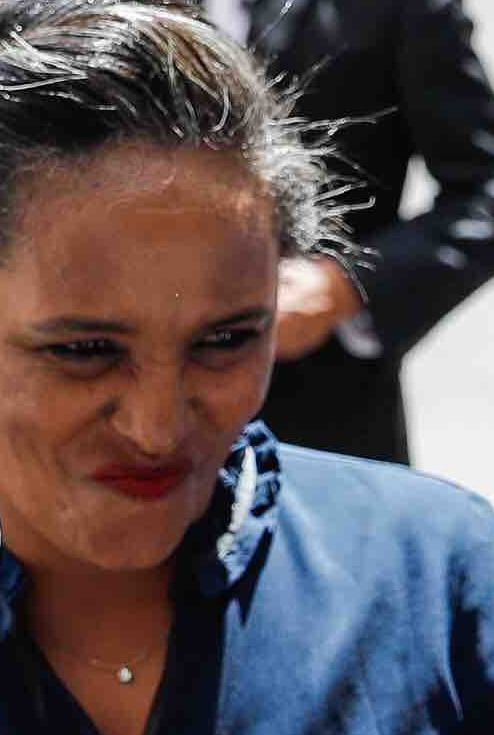
- Derartu in 2019

Personal information
- Native name: Daraartuu Tulluu ደራርቱ ቱሉ
- Born: 21 March 1972 (age 54) Bekoji, Arsi Province, Ethiopian Empire (now Oromia Region, Ethiopia)
- Years active: 1990–2011
- Height: 1.56 m (5 ft 1 in)
- Weight: 44 kg (97 lb)

Sport
- Country: Ethiopia
- Sport: Athletics
- Event: 10,000 metres

Achievements and titles
- Personal bests: 3000 metres: 8:46.32 (Portland, 2000); 5000 metres: 14:44.22 (Brussels, 2003); 10,000 metres: 30:17.49 (Sydney, 2000); Road; 5 km: 15:08 (London, 2004); 10 km: 31:40 (Milan, 2000); Half marathon: 1:08:26 (Remich, 1995) (also 1:07:03 not legal); Marathon: 2:23:30 (Helsinki, 2005)
Medal record
Women's athletics
Representing Ethiopia
Olympic Games
Gold medal – first place	1992 Barcelona	10,000 m
Gold medal – first place	2000 Sydney	10,000 m
Bronze medal – third place	2004 Athens	10,000 m
World Championships
Gold medal – first place	2001 Edmonton	10,000 m
Silver medal – second place	1995 Gothenburg	10,000 m
World Cross Country Championships
Gold medal – first place	1995 Durham	Senior race
Gold medal – first place	1997 Turin	Senior race
Gold medal – first place	2000 Vilamoura	Senior race
African Championships
Gold medal – first place	1990 Cairo	3000 m
Gold medal – first place	1990 Cairo	10,000 m
Gold medal – first place	1992 Belle Vue Harel	3000 m
Gold medal – first place	1992 Belle Vue Harel	10,000 m

President of Ethiopian Athletic Federation
- In office 14 November 2018 – 22 December 2024
- Preceded by: Haile Gebrselassie
- Succeeded by: Sileshi Sihine

Derartu Tulu NL COL (Oromo: Daraartuu Tulluu, Amharic: ደራርቱ ቱሉ; born 21 March 1972) is an Ethiopian former long-distance runner, who competed in track, cross country running, and road running up to the marathon distance.

Derartu is the first Ethiopian woman and the first black African woman to win an Olympic gold medal. She won 10,000 metres titles at the 1992 Barcelona and 2000 Sydney Olympics, and a bronze in the event at the 2004 Athens Olympics. At the World Championships in Athletics, Derartu took silver in the 10,000 m in 1995, and a gold in 2001. She was a three-time IAAF World Cross Country champion (1995, 1997, 2000).

She was serving as the President of Ethiopian Athletics Federation from 2018 to 2024. She was succeeded by Sileshi Sihine. Her replacement cited as a response to controversy surrounding the federation stance during 2024 Summer Olympics in Paris.

Derartu comes from a sporting family of several Olympic medalists, which include her cousins Tirunesh, Genzebe and Ejegayehu Dibaba.

== Life and career ==
Derartu Tulu grew up tending cattle in the village of Bekoji in the highlands of Arsi Province, the same village as Kenenisa Bekele. She is the aunt of Ejegayehu Dibaba, Tirunesh Dibaba and Genzebe Dibaba.

Derartu is the first Ethiopian woman and the first black African woman to win an Olympic gold medal, which she won in the 10,000 m event at the 1992 Barcelona Olympic Games. The race, where she and Elana Meyer (South Africa) raced for lap after lap way ahead of the rest of the field, launched her career. She sat out 1993 and 1994 with a knee injury and returned to competition in the 1995 IAAF World Cross Country Championships where she won gold, having arrived at the race only an hour before the start. She was stuck in Athens airport without sleep for 24 hours. The same year she lost out to Fernanda Ribeiro and won silver at the World Championships 10,000.

The 1996 season was a difficult year for her. At the IAAF World Cross Country Championships Derartu lost her shoe in the race and had to fight back to get fourth place. She also finished fourth at the Olympic Games, where she was nursing an injury. In 1997 she won the world cross country title for the second time, but did not factor in the 10,000 m World Championships. In 1998 she gave birth to a daughter, Tsion, but came back in 2000 in the best shape of her life. She won the 10,000 m Olympic gold for the second time (the only woman to have done this in the short history of the event). She also won the IAAF World Cross Country Championships title for the third time. In 2001, she finally won her world 10,000 track title in Edmonton. This was her third world or Olympic gold medal. She has a total of 5 world and Olympic medals.

Her transition to the marathon was rewarded with victories in London and Tokyo Marathons in 2001. She finished fourth at the 2005 World Championships, setting her personal best time of 2:23:30. She also won the Portugal Half Marathon in 2000 and 2003, and Lisbon Half Marathon in 2003. In 2009, at the age of 37, she won the New York City Marathon, defeating of the likes of Paula Radcliffe, Lyudmila Petrova and Salina Kosgei.

In 2004 Derartu declined to enter the New York Marathon, where she would have been likely to face marathon World Record holder Paula Radcliffe, whom she has had a great rivalry with over the years, and focused instead on the Olympic Games, where she won the bronze medal in the 10,000 m behind Xing Huina and her cousin Ejegayehu Dibaba. (Radcliffe failed to finish.)

Derartu continued to run competitively in her late thirties, while most of her old rivals retired. Her last marathon finish came in 2011 in Yokohama.

She is remembered for her speed and her 60.3 second-last lap at the end of the 10,000 m at the Sydney Olympics was a sprint of note.

=== International competitions ===
Representing Ethiopia
Year	Competition	Venue	Position	Event	Time
1989	World Cross Country Championships	Stavanger, Norway	23rd	Senior woman	23:29
1990	World Cross Country Championships	Aix-les-Bains, France	15th	Senior woman	19:53
1990	African Championships	Cairo, Egypt	1st	3000 m	9:11.21
1990	African Championships	Cairo, Egypt	1st	10,000 m	33:37.82
1990	World Junior Championships	Plovdiv, Bulgaria	1st	10,000 m	32:56.26
1991	World Cross Country Championships	Antwerp, Belgium	2nd	Senior woman	20:27
1991	World Championships	Tokyo, Japan	21st (h)	3000 m	9:01.04
1991	World Championships	Tokyo, Japan	8th	10,000 m	32:16.55
1992	African Championships	Belle Vue Harel, Mauritius	1st	3000 m	9:01.12
1992	African Championships	Belle Vue Harel, Mauritius	1st	10,000 m	31:32.25
1992	World Cup	Havana, Cuba	1st	3000 m	9:05.89
1992	World Cup	Havana, Cuba	1st	10,000 m	33:38.97
1992	Olympic Games	Barcelona, Spain	1st	10,000 m	31:06.02
1995	World Cross Country Championships	Durham, United Kingdom	1st	Senior woman	20:21
1995	World Championships	Gothenburg, Sweden	2nd	10,000 m	31:08.10
1996	Olympic Games	Atlanta, GA, United States	4th	10,000 m	31:10.46
1997	World Cross Country Championships	Turin, Italy	1st	Senior woman	20:53
1997	World Championships	Athens, Greece	24th (h)	10,000 m	33:25.99
1999	World Half Marathon Championships	Palermo, Italy	14th	Half marathon	1:11:33
2000	World Cross Country Championships	Vilamoura, Portugal	1st	Senior woman	25:42
2000	Olympic Games	Sydney, Australia	1st	10,000 m	30:17.49 OR
2001	London Marathon	London, United Kingdom	1st	Marathon	2:23:57
2001	World Championships	Edmonton, Canada	1st	10,000 m	31:48.81
2001	Tokyo International Women's Marathon	Tokyo, Japan	1st	Marathon	2:25:08
2003	World Athletics Final	Monte Carlo, Monaco	2nd	5000 m	14:56.93
2004	World Cross Country Championships	Brussels, Belgium	16th	Senior woman	28:39
2004	Olympic Games	Athens, Greece	3rd	10,000 m	30:26.42 SB
2005	World Half Marathon Championships	Edmonton, Canada	15th	Half marathon	1:12:12
2005	World Championships	Helsinki, Finland	4th	Marathon	2:23:30 PB
2009	New York Marathon	New York, NY, United States	1st	Marathon	2:28:52

== Personal life ==
Tulu is a cousin of the Dibaba siblings – Ejegayehu, Tirunesh and Genzebe Dibaba.

== Accolades ==
Tulu was named to the BBC's 100 Women programme in 2017.

- Order of the Rising Sun, Gold Rays with Rosette (2023)

Olympic Games
Preceded by Fita Bayisa	Flagbearer for Ethiopia; Sydney 2000	Succeeded by Abel Aferalign
