= Ethiopian Olympic Committee =

National Olympic Committee

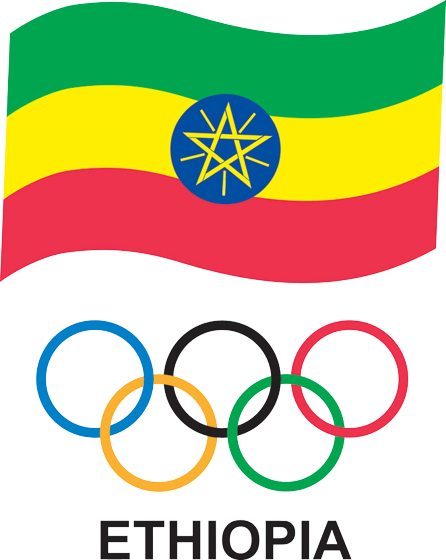
- Country: Ethiopia
- Code: ETH
- Created: 1948
- Recognized: 1954
- Continental Association: ANOCA
- Headquarters: Addis Ababa
- President: Ashebir Woldegiorgis
- Secretary General: Dawit Asfaw

The Ethiopian Olympic Committee (Amharic: የኢትዮጵያ ኦሊምፒክ ኮሚቴ; IOC code: ETH) is the National Olympic Committee representing Ethiopia. It was created in 1948 and recognized by the International Olympic Committee in 1954.

== Presidents ==
- Ato Assefa Mamo
- Dagmawit Girmay (??–2009)
- Birhane Kidanemariam (2009–??)
- Dr Ashebir Woldegiorgis (??–present)

== See also ==
- Ethiopia at the Olympics
