= List of flag bearers for Honduras at the Olympics =

Honduras at the Olympics
- IOC code: HON
- NOC: Comité Olímpico Hondureño
- Website: cohonduras.com (in Spanish)
- Medals: Gold 0 Silver 0 Bronze 0 Total 0

Summer appearances
- 1968; 1972; 1976; 1980; 1984; 1988; 1992; 1996; 2000; 2004; 2008; 2012; 2016; 2020; 2024

Winter appearances
- 1992; 1994–2026

This is a list of flag bearers who have represented Honduras at the Olympics.

Flag bearers carry the national flag of their country at the opening ceremony of the Olympic Games.

#	Event year	Season	Flag bearer	Sport
1	1968	Summer		
2	1976	Summer		
3	1984	Summer	Carlos Soto	Judo
4	1988	Summer	Santiago Fonseca	Race walking
5	1992	Winter	Jenny Palacios-Stillo	Cross-country skiing
6	1992	Summer		
7	1996	Summer	Darwin Angeles	Boxing
8	2000	Summer	Alejandro Castellanos	Swimming
9	2004	Summer	Iizzwa Medina	Table Tennis
10	2008	Summer	Miguel Ferrera	Taekwondo
11	2012	Summer	Ronald Bennett	Athletics
12	2016	Summer	Rolando Palacios	Athletics
13	2020	Summer	Keyla Ávila	Taekwondo
13	2020	Summer	Julio Horrego	Swimming
14	2024	Summer	Julimar Ávila	Swimming
14	2024	Summer	Kevin Mejía	Wrestling

== See also ==
- Honduras at the Olympics
