= Honduras at the 2025 World Aquatics Championships =

- Flag of Honduras
- World Aquatics code: HON
- National federation: Federación Hondureña de Natación

in Singapore
- Competitors: 5 in 2 sports
- Medals: Gold 0 Silver 0 Bronze 0 Total 0

World Aquatics Championships appearances
- 1973; 1975; 1978; 1982; 1986; 1991; 1994; 1998; 2001; 2003; 2005; 2007; 2009; 2011; 2013; 2015; 2017; 2019; 2022; 2023; 2024; 2025

Honduras is competing at the 2025 World Aquatics Championships in Singapore from 11 July to 3 August 2025.

== Competitors ==
The following is the list of competitors in the Championships.

Sport	Men	Women	Total
Open water swimming	1	0	1
Swimming	2	2	4
Total	3	2	5

== Open water swimming ==
Men

Athlete	Event	Heat		Semifinal		Final	
Athlete	Event	Time	Rank	Time	Rank	Time	Rank
Diego Dulieu	3 km knockout sprints	18:03.10	21	Did not advance			
Diego Dulieu	5 km	—				1:02:41.90	45
Diego Dulieu	10 km	—				2:11:07.10	39

== Swimming ==
Men

Athlete	Event	Heat		Semifinal		Final	
Athlete	Event	Time	Rank	Time	Rank	Time	Rank
Gabriel Martinez	50 m freestyle	23.02	54	Did not advance			
Gabriel Martinez	100 m freestyle	50.07	45	Did not advance			
Sebastian Serafeim	200 m freestyle	1:55.85	48	Did not advance			
Sebastian Serafeim	100 m butterfly	56.88	62	Did not advance			

Women

Athlete	Event	Heat		Semifinal		Final	
Athlete	Event	Time	Rank	Time	Rank	Time	Rank
Ashley Calderon	50 m butterfly	28.61	52	Did not advance			
Ashley Calderon	100 m butterfly	1:03.45	44	Did not advance			
Sairy Escalante	50 m breaststroke	35.34	46	Did not advance			
Sairy Escalante	100 m breaststroke	1:19.67	56	Did not advance			
