= List of Honduran records in swimming =

The Honduran records in swimming are the fastest ever performances of swimmers from Honduras, which are recognised and ratified by the Federación Hondureña de Natación (FEHNA).

All records were set in finals unless noted otherwise.

== Long Course (50 m) ==
=== Men ===
Event	Time		Name	Club	Date	Meet	Location	Ref
50 m freestyle	22.62		Gabriel Martinez	Honduras	28 July 2026	CAC Games	Santo Domingo, Dominican Republic	
100 m freestyle	49.67		Gabriel Martinez	CN Antibes	20 March 2026	Giant Open	Saint-Denis, France	
200 m freestyle	1:51.65		Gabriel Martinez	C.N. Las Palmas	5 July 2026	Regional Absolute Championships	Las Palmas, Spain	
400 m freestyle	3:58.46		Diego Dulieu	Azura Florida Aquatics	20 July 2024	FG Senior Championships	Coral Springs, United States	
800 m freestyle	8:11.51		Diego Dulieu	Azura Florida Aquatics	8 June 2024	Porto International Meeting	Porto, Portugal	
1500 m freestyle	15:34.76		Diego Dulieu	Azura Florida Aquatics	23 May 2024	Annual Aquatic Centre International	Christ Church, Barbados	
50 m backstroke	27.73		Jaime Uribe	Natacion Municipalidad DE Sps	13 June 2026	Feria Juniana Cup	San Pedro Sula, Honduras	
100 m backstroke	59.76		Sebastian Serafeim	Honduras	19 October 2025	Central American Games	Guatemala City, Guatemala	
200 m backstroke	2:11.71		Abrahan Flores	Azura Florida Aquatics	25 June 2022	FG SOFLO TYR Last Chance Meet	Pembroke Pines, United States	
50 m breaststroke	27.81		Julio Horrego	South Florida Aquatic Club	26 June 2021	Bahamian Championships	Nassau, Bahamas	
100 m breaststroke	1:01.18		Julio Horrego	South Florida Aquatic Club	27 June 2021	Bahamian Championships	Nassau, Bahamas	
200 m breaststroke	2:14.15	h	Julio Horrego	South Florida Aquatic Club	13 April 2024	TYR Pro Swim Series	San Antonio, United States	
50m butterfly	24.98		Carlos Vasquez	Honduras	24 June 2021	CCCAN Championships	San Juan, Puerto Rico	
100m butterfly	54.94	tt	Allan Gutiérrez Castro	Honduras	2016	CISC	Nassau, Bahamas	
200m butterfly	2:02.23	h	Javier Hernández Maradiaga	Honduras	11 August 2008	Olympic Games	Beijing, China	
200m individual medley	2:04.85		Julio Horrego	Honduras	2 July 2018	CCCAN	Savaneta, Aruba	
400m individual medley	4:32.70		Julio Horrego	Honduras	30 June 2016	CISC	Nassau, Bahamas	
4×100m freestyle relay	3:28.71		Gabriel Martinez (51.85); Carlos Vasquez (51.81); Ian Redman (53.22); Julio Horrego (51.83)	Honduras	25 June 2023	CAC Games	San Salvador, El Salvador	
4×200m freestyle relay	7:46.31		Diego Dulieu (1:57.46); Carlos Vasquez (1:57.57); Gabriel Martinez (1:56.87); Julio Horrego (1:54.41)	Honduras	24 June 2023	CAC Games	San Salvador, El Salvador	
4×100m medley relay	3:54.04		Gabriel Martinez (1:02.31); Julio Horrego (1:02.58); Carlos Vasquez (55.80); Ian Redman (53.35)	Honduras	29 June 2023	CAC Games	San Salvador, El Salvador	

Legend: # – Record awaiting ratification by Federación Hondureña de Natación; WR – World record; AM – Americas record; e – equalled existing record;
Records not set in finals: h – heat; sf – semifinal; r – relay 1st leg; rh – relay heat 1st leg; b – B final; † – en route to final mark; so – swim-off; tt – time trial

=== Women ===
Event	Time		Name	Club	Date	Meet	Location	Ref
50m freestyle	26.55		Julimar Avila	Azura Florida Aquatics	20 May 2021	Puerto Rican International Open	Salinas, Puerto Rico	
100m freestyle	57.51		Julimar Avila	Honduras	2 December 2019	XXXVII Invitational International Naco	Santo Domingo, Dominican Republic	
200m freestyle	2:02.27	b	Sara Pastrana	Honduras	30 June 2016	CISC	Nassau, Bahamas	
400m freestyle	4:21.84		Sara Pastrana	Honduras	20 July 2018	CAC Games	Barranquilla, Colombia	
800m freestyle	9:08.81		Michelle Ramirez	Honduras	23 June 2021	CCCAN	San Juan, Puerto Rico	
1500m freestyle	17:25.83		Michelle Ramirez	Honduras	25 June 2021	CCCAN	San Juan, Puerto Rico	
50m backstroke	30.25		Karen Vilorio	Honduras	29 June 2016	CISC	Nassau, Bahamas	
100m backstroke	1:02.91	tt	Karen Vilorio	Honduras	2016	CISC	Nassau, Bahamas	
200m backstroke	2:18.04	h	Karen Vilorio	Honduras	2 August 2013	World Championships	Barcelona, Spain	
50m breaststroke	34.09		Julimar Avila	Honduras	27 June 2021	CCCAN Championships	San Juan, Puerto Rico	
100m breaststroke	1:14.01		Ana Castellanos	Honduras	25 March 2012	Speedo Champions Series	Buffalo, United States	
200m breaststroke	2:39.60		Ana Maria Castellanos	Honduras	15 August 2012	New England Open	Cambridge, United States	
50m butterfly	27.85		Ashley Calderon	Honduras	1 August 2026	CAC Games	Santo Domingo, Dominican Republic	
100m butterfly	1:01.29		Julimar Avila	Honduras	12 April 2024	Eindhoven Qualification Meet	Eindhoven, Netherlands	
200m butterfly	2:14.92		Julimar Avila	Honduras	11 April 2024	Eindhoven Qualification Meet	Eindhoven, Netherlands	
200m individual medley	2:20.63		Julimar Avila	Honduras	2 December 2019	XXXVII Invitational International Naco	Santo Domingo, Dominican Republic	
400m individual medley	4:59.27		Sara Pastrana	Honduras	23 July 2018	CAC Games	Barranquilla, Colombia	
4×100m freestyle relay	4:02.83		Gabriela Paredes (1:01.04); Sara Pastrana (1:00.00); Julimar Avila (58.83); Jennifer Ramirez (1:02.96)	Honduras	24 July 2018	CAC Games	Barranquilla, Colombia	
4×200m freestyle relay	8:47.02		Ana Pastrana; Maeform Borriello; Caroll Martinez; Sara Pastrana	Honduras	1 July 2017	CCCAN	Couva, Trinidad and Tobago	
4×100m medley relay	4:30.51			Honduras	6 December 2017	Central American Games	Managua, Nicaragua	

Legend: # – Record awaiting ratification by Federación Hondureña de Natación; WR – World record; AM – Americas record; e – equalled existing record;
Records not set in finals: h – heat; sf – semifinal; r – relay 1st leg; rh – relay heat 1st leg; b – B final; † – en route to final mark; so – swim-off; tt – time trial

=== Mixed relay ===
Event	Time	Name	Nationality	Date	Meet	Location	Ref
4×50m freestyle relay	1:45.29	George Jabbour; Marco Flores; Sara Pastrana; Caroll Martinez	Honduras	7 June 2016	CAMEX	Panama City, Panama	
4×100m freestyle relay	3:39.95	Gabriel Martinez (51.21); Julimar Avila (58.47); Sara Pastrana (58.87); Julio Horrego (51.40)	Honduras	27 June 2023	CAC Games	San Salvador, El Salvador	
4×50m medley relay							
4×100m medley relay	4:10.64	Alfonso Duran (1:02.27); Julio Horrego (1:04.16); Julio Horrego (1:03.53); Gabriela Paredes (1:00.68)	Honduras	20 July 2018	CAC Games	Barranquilla, Colombia	

Legend: # – Record awaiting ratification by Federación Hondureña de Natación; e – equalled existing record;
Records not set in finals: h – heat; so – swim-off

== Short Course (25 m) ==
=== Men ===
Event	Time		Name	Club	Date	Meet	Location	Ref
50 m freestyle	21.84	h, =	Gabriel Martinez	Albion	25 October 2026	Dutch Qualifiers	Rotterdam, Netherlands	
50 m freestyle	21.84	=	Gabriel Martinez	Albion	25 October 2026	Dutch Qualifiers	Rotterdam, Netherlands	
100 m freestyle	48.12		Gabriel Martinez	Albion	24 October 2026	Dutch Qualifiers	Rotterdam, Netherlands	
200 m freestyle	1:47.84		Gabriel Martinez	C.N. Las Palmas	19 December 2025	Spanish Club Cup First Division	Pontevedra, Spain	
400 m freestyle	3:56.48	h	Diego Dulieu	Honduras	3 November 2022	World Cup	Indianapolis, United States	
800 m freestyle	8:01.94		Diego Dulieu	Honduras	14 December 2024	World Championships	Budapest, Hungary	
1500 m freestyle	15:18.95		Diego Dulieu	Honduras	4 November 2022	World Cup	Indianapolis, United States	
50m backstroke	27.38		Gabriel Martinez	Delfines Sampedranos	8 August 2022	Honduran Championships	San Pedro Sula, Honduras	
50m backstroke	27.25	#	Douglas Romero	Delfines Sampedranos	12 December 2025	Honduran Championships	San Pedro Sula, Honduras	
100m backstroke	59.15	h	Roy Barahona	Honduras	12 December 2012	World Championships	Istanbul, Turkey	
100m backstroke	58.25	tt, #	Sebastian Serafeim	Tiburones DE Honduras	14 December 2025	Honduran Championships	San Pedro Sula, Honduras	
200m backstroke	2:06.84		Abrahan Flores	Municip San Pedro Sula Honduras	6 August 2022	Honduran Championships	San Pedro Sula, Honduras	
50m breaststroke	27.38	h	Julio Horrego	Honduras	20 December 2021	World Championships	Abu Dhabi, United Arab Emirates	
100m breaststroke	58.80	h	Julio Horrego	Honduras	16 December 2021	World Championships	Abu Dhabi, United Arab Emirates	
200m breaststroke	2:14.06	h	Julio Horrego	Honduras	5 November 2022	World Cup	Indianapolis, United States	
50m butterfly	24.12	b	Gabriel Martinez	Albion	22 October 2026	Dutch Qualifiers	Rotterdam, Netherlands	
100m butterfly	53.36	h	Carlos Vasquez	Honduras	17 December 2022	World Championships	Melbourne, Australia	
200m butterfly	1:58.41	h	Carlos Vasquez	Honduras	16 December 2021	World Championships	Abu Dhabi, United Arab Emirates	
100m individual medley	59.26		Fernando Bustillo	Honduras	29 October 2021	Puerto Rico International Open	San Juan, Puerto Rico	
200m individual medley	2:11.98		Gabriel Martinez	Delfines Sampedranos	5 August 2022	Honduran Championships	San Pedro Sula, Honduras	
400m individual medley	5:02.23	h	Carlos Vasquez	Honduras	10 December 2016	World Championships	Windsor, Canada	
4×50m freestyle relay								
4×100m freestyle relay								
4×200m freestyle relay								
4×50m medley relay								
4×100m medley relay								

Legend: # – Record awaiting ratification by Federación Hondureña de Natación; WR – World record; AM – Americas record; e – equalled existing record;
Records not set in finals: h – heat; sf – semifinal; r – relay 1st leg; rh – relay heat 1st leg; b – B final; † – en route to final mark; so – swim-off; tt – time trial

=== Women ===
Event	Time		Name	Club	Date	Meet	Location	Ref
50 m freestyle	27.27	h	Karen Vilorio	Honduras	11 December 2016	World Championships	Windsor, Canada	
100 m freestyle	56.86		Julimar Avila	Brompton	5 November 2023	SE London Winter Championships	London, United Kingdom	
200 m freestyle	2:01.68	h	Julimar Avila	Honduras	16 December 2021	World Championships	Abu Dhabi, United Arab Emirates	
400 m freestyle	4:22.14		Michell Ramirez	Guaynabo City Mets	21 October 2022	Puerto Rico International Open	San Juan, Puerto Rico	
800 m freestyle	9:02.90		Michell Ramirez	Guaynabo City Mets	10 September 2022	2da Comperencia Zonas 3-4	San Juan, Puerto Rico	
1500 m freestyle	19:21.16	#	Daylin Benitez	Natacion Municipalidad DE Sps	11 December 2025	Honduran Championships	San Pedro Sula, Honduras	
50 m backstroke	29.81	h	Karen Vilorio	Honduras	9 December 2016	World Championships	Windsor, Canada	
100 m backstroke	1:02.83	h	Ashley Calderon	Honduras	10 December 2024	World Championships	Budapest, Hungary	
200 m backstroke	2:24.15	h	Karen Vilorio	Honduras	17 December 2010	World Championships	Dubai, United Arab Emirates	
50 m breaststroke	34.36		Julimar Avila	Municip San Pedro Sula Honduras	6 August 2022	Honduran Championships	San Pedro Sula, Honduras	
100 m breaststroke	1:19.14		Julimar Avila	Honduras	8 June 2013	NE BGSC Gator Summer Sizzler	Waltham, United States	
200 m breaststroke	2:58.99		Julimar Avila	Honduras	11 June 2011	NE BGSC Summer Sizzler	Waltham, United States	
50m butterfly	28.38	h	Julimar Avila	Brompton	5 November 2023	SE London Winter Championships	London, United Kingdom	
100m butterfly	1:01.43	h	Julimar Avila	Honduras	17 December 2022	World Championships	Melbourne, Australia	
200m butterfly	2:12.90	h	Julimar Avila	Honduras	17 December 2021	World Championships	Abu Dhabi, United Arab Emirates	
100m individual medley	1:07.96	h	Sara Pastrana	Honduras	13 December 2018	World Championships	Hangzhou, China	
200m individual medley	2:23.29		Julimar Avila	Municip San Pedro Sula Honduras	5 August 2022	Honduran Championships	San Pedro Sula, Honduras	
400m individual medley	5:14.86		Julimar Avila	Honduras	11 June 2011	NE BGSC Summer Sizzler	Waltham, United States	
4×50m freestyle relay								
4×100m freestyle relay								
4×200m freestyle relay								
4×50m medley relay								
4×100m medley relay								

Legend: # – Record awaiting ratification by Federación Hondureña de Natación; WR – World record; AM – Americas record; e – equalled existing record;
Records not set in finals: h – heat; sf – semifinal; r – relay 1st leg; rh – relay heat 1st leg; b – B final; † – en route to final mark; so – swim-off; tt – time trial

=== Mixed relay ===
Event	Time		Name	Club	Date	Meet	Location	Ref
4×50 m freestyle relay								
4×50 m medley relay	1:53.77	h	Maeform Borriello (30.70); Marco Flores (30.38); George Jabbour (25.58); Sara Pastrana (27.11)	Honduras	8 December 2016	World Championships	Windsor, Canada	

Legend: # – Record awaiting ratification by Federación Hondureña de Natación; WR – World record; AM – Americas record; e – equalled existing record;
Records not set in finals: h – heat; so – swim-off
