= Honduras at the 2016 Summer Olympics =

- IOC code: HON
- NOC: Comité Olímpico Hondureño
- Website: cohonduras.com (in Spanish)

in Rio de Janeiro
- Competitors: 25 in 7 sports
- Flag bearer: Rolando Palacios
- Medals: Gold 0 Silver 0 Bronze 0 Total 0

Summer Olympics appearances (overview)
- 1968; 1972; 1976; 1980; 1984; 1988; 1992; 1996; 2000; 2004; 2008; 2012; 2016; 2020; 2024

Honduras competed at the 2016 Summer Olympics in Rio de Janeiro, Brazil, from 5 to 21 August 2016. This was the nation's eleventh appearance at the Summer Olympics.

The Honduran Olympic Committee (Spanish: Comité Olímpico Hondureño) sent the nation's second-largest delegation to the Games, matching its roster size with Beijing 2008. A total of 26 athletes, 25 men and 1 woman, were selected to the Honduran team across eight sports, with the men's football squad returning for its third consecutive appearance at these Games. Among the Honduran athletes were weightlifter Cristopher Pavón, butterfly swimmer Allan Gutiérrez, taekwondo fighter Miguel Ferrera, and track sprinter Rolando Palacios, who led the squad as the nation's flag bearer in the opening ceremony.

Honduras narrowly missed out on its first ever Olympic medal in Rio de Janeiro, as the men's football team, led by captain Bryan Acosta, suffered a 2–3 defeat to the Nigerians for the bronze.

== Athletics ==
Honduras received a universality slot from IAAF to send a male athlete to the Olympics.:

Key

- Note–Ranks given for track events are within the athlete's heat only
- Q = Qualified for the next round
- q = Qualified for the next round as a fastest loser or, in field events, by position without achieving the qualifying target
- NR = National record
- N/A = Round not applicable for the event
- Bye = Athlete not required to compete in round

Track & road events

Athlete	Event	Heat		Semifinal		Final	
Athlete	Event	Result	Rank	Result	Rank	Result	Rank
Rolando Palacios	Men's 200 m	21.32	7	Did not advance			

== Boxing ==
Honduras entered one boxer to compete only in the men's lightweight division into the Olympic boxing tournament. Teofimo Lopéz had claimed his Olympic spot with a semifinal victory at the 2016 American Qualification Tournament in Buenos Aires, Argentina.

Athlete	Event	Round of 32	Round of 16	Quarterfinals	Semifinals	Final	
Athlete	Event	Opposition Result	Opposition Result	Opposition Result	Opposition Result	Opposition Result	Rank
Teofimo Lopéz	Men's lightweight	Oumiha (FRA); L 0–3	Did not advance				

== Football ==
=== Men's tournament ===
Honduras men's football team qualified for the Olympics by attaining a top two finish at the 2015 CONCACAF Men's Olympic Qualifying Championship in the United States.

Team roster

The following is the Honduras final squad in the men's football tournament of the 2016 Summer Olympics. On 28 July, Kevin López left the squad due to injury and was replaced by Marcelo Espinal.

Head coach: (Colombia) Jorge Luis Pinto

No.	Pos.	Player	Date of birth (age)	Caps	Goals	2016 club
1	GK	Luis López	13 September 1993 (aged 22)	0	0	(National Autonomous Federation of Football of Honduras) Real España
2	DF	Jonathan Paz	18 June 1995 (aged 21)	0	0	(National Autonomous Federation of Football of Honduras) CD Real Sociedad
3	DF	Marcelo Pereira	27 May 1995 (aged 21)	0	0	(National Autonomous Federation of Football of Honduras) Motagua
4	DF	Kevin Álvarez	3 August 1996 (aged 20)	0	0	(National Autonomous Federation of Football of Honduras) Olimpia
5	DF	Allans Vargas	25 September 1993 (aged 22)	0	0	(National Autonomous Federation of Football of Honduras) Real España
6	MF	Bryan Acosta (c)	24 November 1993 (aged 22)	0	0	(National Autonomous Federation of Football of Honduras) Real España
7	MF	Brayan Ramírez	16 June 1994 (aged 22)	0	0	(National Autonomous Federation of Football of Honduras) Juticalpa
8	DF	Johnny Palacios*	20 December 1986 (aged 29)	0	0	(National Autonomous Federation of Football of Honduras) Olimpia
9	FW	Anthony Lozano	25 April 1993 (aged 23)	0	0	(Royal Spanish Football Federation) Tenerife
10	MF	Óscar Salas	8 December 1993 (aged 22)	0	0	(National Autonomous Federation of Football of Honduras) Olimpia
11	MF	Marcelo Espinal	24 February 1993 (aged 23)	0	0	Unattached
12	FW	Romell Quioto*	9 August 1991 (aged 24)	0	0	(National Autonomous Federation of Football of Honduras) Olimpia
13	MF	Jhow Benavídez	26 December 1995 (aged 20)	0	0	(National Autonomous Federation of Football of Honduras) Real España
14	MF	Elder Torres	14 April 1995 (aged 21)	0	0	(United States Soccer Federation) Real Monarchs
15	MF	Allan Banegas	4 October 1993 (aged 22)	0	0	(National Autonomous Federation of Football of Honduras) Marathón
16	DF	Brayan García	26 May 1993 (aged 23)	0	0	(National Autonomous Federation of Football of Honduras) Vida
17	FW	Alberth Elis	12 February 1996 (aged 20)	0	0	(National Autonomous Federation of Football of Honduras) Olimpia
18	GK	Harold Fonseca	8 October 1993 (aged 22)	0	0	(National Autonomous Federation of Football of Honduras) Juticalpa

* Over-aged player.

Group play

Pos	Team	Pld	W	D	L	GF	GA	GD	Pts	Qualification
1	Portugal	3	2	1	0	5	2	+3	7	Quarter-finals
2	Honduras	3	1	1	1	5	5	0	4	Quarter-finals
3	Argentina	3	1	1	1	3	4	−1	4	
4	Algeria	3	0	1	2	4	6	−2	1	

Source: Rio2016 & FIFA
Rules for classification: Tiebreakers
4 August 2016
15:00

Honduras	3–2	Algeria
Quioto 13'; Pereira 33'; Lozano 79'	Report (Rio2016); Report (FIFA)	Bendebka 68'; Bounedjah 85'

Estádio Olímpico João Havelange, Rio de Janeiro
Attendance: 20,000
Referee: Sandro Ricci (Brazil)

7 August 2016
15:00

Honduras	1–2	Portugal
Elis 1'	Report (Rio2016); Report (FIFA)	Figueiredo 21'; Paciência 36'

Estádio Olímpico João Havelange, Rio de Janeiro
Attendance: 32,928
Referee: Roddy Zambrano (Ecuador)

10 August 2016
13:00

Argentina	1–1	Honduras
Martínez 90+3'	Report (Rio2016); Report (FIFA)	Lozano 75' (pen.)

Estádio Nacional Mané Garrincha, Brasília
Attendance: 16,029
Referee: Antonio Mateu Lahoz (Spain)

Quarterfinal

13 August 2016
19:00

South Korea	0–1	Honduras
	Report (Rio2016); Report (FIFA)	Elis 59'

Mineirão, Belo Horizonte
Attendance: 36,704
Referee: Gehad Grisha (Egypt)

Semifinal

17 August 2016
13:00

Brazil	6–0	Honduras
Neymar 1', 90+1' (pen.); Gabriel Jesus 26', 35'; Marquinhos 51'; Luan Vieira 79'	Report (Rio2016); Report (FIFA)

Maracanã Stadium, Rio de Janeiro
Attendance: 52,457
Referee: Ovidiu Hațegan (Romania)

Bronze medal match

20 August 2016
13:00

Honduras	2–3	Nigeria
Lozano 71'; Pereira 86'	Report (Rio2016); Report (FIFA)	Sadiq 34', 56'; Umar 49'

Mineirão, Belo Horizonte
Attendance: 9,091
Referee: Sandro Ricci (Brazil)

== Judo ==
Honduras qualified one judoka for the men's heavyweight category (+100 kg) at the Games. Cuban-born Ramón Pileta earned a continental quota spot from the Pan American region as Honduras' top-ranked judoka outside of direct qualifying position in the IJF World Ranking List of May 30, 2016.

Athlete	Event	Round of 32	Round of 16	Quarterfinals	Semifinals	Repechage	Final / BM	
Athlete	Event	Opposition Result	Opposition Result	Opposition Result	Opposition Result	Opposition Result	Opposition Result	Rank
Ramón Pileta	Men's +100 kg	R Silva (BRA); L 000–110	Did not advance					

== Swimming ==
Honduras received a Universality invitation from FINA to send two swimmers (one male and one female) to the Olympics.

Athlete	Event	Heat		Semifinal		Final	
Athlete	Event	Time	Rank	Time	Rank	Time	Rank
Allan Gutiérrez Castro	Men's 100 m butterfly	55.20	39	Did not advance			
Sara Pastrana	Women's 200 m freestyle	2:03.19	38	Did not advance			

== Taekwondo ==
Honduras received an invitation from the Tripartite Commission to send Beijing 2008 Olympian Miguel Ferrera in the men's welterweight category (80 kg) into the Olympic taekwondo competition.

Athlete	Event	Round of 16	Quarterfinals	Semifinals	Repechage	Final / BM	
Athlete	Event	Opposition Result	Opposition Result	Opposition Result	Opposition Result	Opposition Result	Rank
Miguel Ferrera	Men's −80 kg	Khodabakhshi (IRI); L 1–13 PTG	Did not advance				

== Weightlifting ==
Honduras received an invitation from the Tripartite Commission to send London 2012 Olympian Cristopher Pavón in the men's middle-heavyweight category (94 kg) to the Olympics.

Athlete	Event	Snatch		Clean & Jerk		Total	Rank
Athlete	Event	Result	Rank	Result	Rank	Total	Rank
Cristopher Pavón	Men's −94 kg	145	15	180	15	325	15

== See also ==
- Honduras at the 2015 Pan American Games
