= Honduras at the 2015 World Aquatics Championships =

- Flag of Honduras
- FINA code: HON
- National federation: Federación Hondureña de Natación

in Kazan, Russia
- Competitors: 4 in 1 sport
- Medals: Gold 0 Silver 0 Bronze 0 Total 0

World Aquatics Championships appearances
- 1973; 1975; 1978; 1982; 1986; 1991; 1994; 1998; 2001; 2003; 2005; 2007; 2009; 2011; 2013; 2015; 2017; 2019; 2022; 2023; 2024

Honduras competed at the 2015 World Aquatics Championships in Kazan, Russia from 24 July to 9 August 2015.

== Swimming ==
Honduran swimmers have achieved qualifying standards in the following events (up to a maximum of 2 swimmers in each event at the A-standard entry time, and 1 at the B-standard):

Men

Athlete	Event	Heat		Semifinal		Final	
Athlete	Event	Time	Rank	Time	Rank	Time	Rank
Jésus Flores	50 m breaststroke	30.33	56	did not advance			
Jésus Flores	100 m breaststroke	1:06.14	60	did not advance			
Allan Gutiérrez	50 m freestyle	23.47	48	did not advance			
Allan Gutiérrez	100 m freestyle	51.83	69	did not advance			

Women

Athlete	Event	Heat		Semifinal		Final	
Athlete	Event	Time	Rank	Time	Rank	Time	Rank
Sara Pastrana	200 m freestyle	2:06.15	49	did not advance			
Sara Pastrana	400 m freestyle	4:32.58	43	—		did not advance	
Karen Vilorio	100 m backstroke	1:04.54	46	did not advance			
Karen Vilorio	200 m backstroke	2:18.70	35	did not advance			
