= Honduras at the 2013 World Aquatics Championships =

- Flag of Honduras
- FINA code: HON
- National federation: Federación Hondureña de Natación

in Barcelona, Spain
- Competitors: 4 in 1 sports
- Medals: Gold 0 Silver 0 Bronze 0 Total 0

World Aquatics Championships appearances
- 1973; 1975; 1978; 1982; 1986; 1991; 1994; 1998; 2001; 2003; 2005; 2007; 2009; 2011; 2013; 2015; 2017; 2019; 2022; 2023; 2024

Honduras is competing at the 2013 World Aquatics Championships in Barcelona, Spain between 19 July and 4 August 2013.

== Swimming ==
Honduran swimmers achieved qualifying standards in the following events (up to a maximum of 2 swimmers in each event at the A-standard entry time, and 1 at the B-standard):

Men

| Athlete | Event | Heat | | Semifinal | | Final | |
| Athlete | Event | Time | Rank | Time | Rank | Time | Rank |
|---|---|---|---|---|---|---|---|
| Jésus Flores | 50 m breaststroke | 29.76 | 59 | did not advance | | | |
| Jésus Flores | 100 m breaststroke | 1:05.32 | 55 | did not advance | | | |
| Allan Gutiérrez | 50 m freestyle | 23.47 | =47 | did not advance | | | |
| Allan Gutiérrez | 100 m freestyle | 51.69 | 43 | did not advance | | | |

Women

| Athlete | Event | Heat | | Semifinal | | Final | |
| Athlete | Event | Time | Rank | Time | Rank | Time | Rank |
|---|---|---|---|---|---|---|---|
| Julimar Avila | 100 m freestyle | 57.92 | 46 | did not advance | | | |
| Julimar Avila | 200 m butterfly | 2:19.56 | 23 | did not advance | | | |
| Karen Vilorio | 100 m backstroke | 1:04.79 | 38 | did not advance | | | |
| Karen Vilorio | 200 m backstroke | 2:18.04 | 32 | did not advance | | | |
