= Honduras at the 2012 Summer Olympics =

- IOC code: HON
- NOC: Comité Olímpico Hondureño
- Website: cohonduras.com (in Spanish)

in London
- Competitors: 27 in 8 sports
- Flag bearers: Ronald Bennett (opening); Karen Vilorio (closing)
- Medals: Gold 0 Silver 0 Bronze 0 Total 0

Summer Olympics appearances (overview)
- 1968; 1972; 1976; 1980; 1984; 1988; 1992; 1996; 2000; 2004; 2008; 2012; 2016; 2020; 2024; 2028

Honduras competed at the 2012 Summer Olympics in London, United Kingdom, from 27 July to 12 August 2012. This was the nation's tenth appearance at the Olympics, the team having missed the 1972 Summer Olympics in Munich, and the 1980 Summer Olympics in Moscow, because they participated in the American-led boycott.

Comité Olímpico Hondureño sent the nation's largest delegation to the Games, two more than Beijing. A total of 27 athletes, 24 men and 3 women, competed in 8 sports. Most of them participated in men's football, the only team sport the nation competed in at these Olympic games. The Honduran team also included two hurdlers, Jeimy Bernárdez, who competed at her second consecutive Olympics, and Ronald Bennett, who was the nation's flag bearer at the opening ceremony. Honduras made its Olympic debut in shooting, in the women's pistol event. Honduran athletes did not win any medal and has yet to win an Olympic medal at any Games.

== Athletics ==
Key

- Note–Ranks given for track events are within the athlete's heat only
- Q = Qualified for the next round
- q = Qualified for the next round as a fastest loser or, in field events, by position without achieving the qualifying target
- NR = National record
- N/A = Round not applicable for the event
- Bye = Athlete not required to compete in round

Men

Athlete	Event	Heat		Semifinal		Final	
Athlete	Event	Result	Rank	Result	Rank	Result	Rank
Ronald Bennett	110 m hurdles	14.45	9	Did not advance			

Women

Athlete	Event	Heat		Semifinal		Final	
Athlete	Event	Result	Rank	Result	Rank	Result	Rank
Jeimy Bernárdez	100 m hurdles	14.36	8	Did not advance			

== Boxing ==
Honduras has had 1 boxer invited

Men

Athlete	Event	Round of 32	Round of 16	Quarterfinals	Semifinals	Final	
Athlete	Event	Opposition Result	Opposition Result	Opposition Result	Opposition Result	Opposition Result	Rank
Bayron Molina	Light flyweight	Singh (IND); L RSC	Did not advance				

== Football ==
Honduras has qualified for the men's event.

- Men's team event – 1 team of 18 players.

=== Men's tournament ===
Team roster

The following is the Honduras squad in the men's football tournament of the 2012 Summer Olympics.

Coach: (Colombia) Luis Fernando Suárez

No.	Pos.	Player	Date of birth (age)	Caps	Goals	2012 club
1	GK	José Mendoza	21 July 1989 (aged 23)	6	0	(National Autonomous Federation of Football of Honduras) Platense
2	DF	Wilmer Crisanto	24 June 1989 (aged 23)	5	0	(National Autonomous Federation of Football of Honduras) Victoria
3	DF	Maynor Figueroa*	2 May 1983 (aged 29)	8	0	(The Football Association) Wigan Athletic
4	DF	Hilder Colón	6 April 1989 (aged 23)	6	0	(National Autonomous Federation of Football of Honduras) Real España
5	DF	José Velásquez	8 December 1989 (aged 22)	1	0	(National Autonomous Federation of Football of Honduras) Victoria
6	MF	Arnold Peralta	29 March 1989 (aged 23)	6	0	(National Autonomous Federation of Football of Honduras) Vida
7	MF	Mario Martínez	30 July 1989 (aged 22)	7	2	(National Autonomous Federation of Football of Honduras) Real España
8	MF	Alfredo Mejía	3 April 1990 (aged 22)	6	0	(National Autonomous Federation of Football of Honduras) Motagua
9	FW	Anthony Lozano	25 April 1993 (aged 19)	4	2	(Royal Spanish Football Federation) Valencia B
10	MF	Alexander López	5 June 1992 (aged 20)	6	1	(National Autonomous Federation of Football of Honduras) Olimpia
11	FW	Jerry Bengtson*	8 April 1987 (aged 25)	0	0	(United States Soccer Federation) New England Revolution
12	DF	Orlin Peralta	12 February 1990 (aged 22)	6	0	(National Autonomous Federation of Football of Honduras) Vida
13	FW	Eddie Hernández	27 February 1991 (aged 21)	6	3	(National Autonomous Federation of Football of Honduras) Platense
14	MF	Andy Najar	16 March 1993 (aged 19)	4	0	(United States Soccer Federation) D.C. United
15	MF	Roger Espinoza*	25 October 1986 (aged 25)	0	0	(United States Soccer Federation) Sporting Kansas City
16	DF	Johnny Leverón (c)	7 February 1990 (aged 22)	7	1	(National Autonomous Federation of Football of Honduras) Motagua
17	MF	Luis Garrido	5 November 1990 (aged 21)	4	0	(National Autonomous Federation of Football of Honduras) Olimpia
18	GK	Francisco Reyes	7 February 1990 (aged 22)	0	0	(National Autonomous Federation of Football of Honduras) Olimpia

* Over-aged player.

Group play

Pos	Team	Pld	W	D	L	GF	GA	GD	Pts	Qualification
1	Japan	3	2	1	0	2	0	+2	7	Advance to knockout stage
2	Honduras	3	1	2	0	3	2	+1	5	Advance to knockout stage
3	Morocco	3	0	2	1	2	3	−1	2	
4	Spain	3	0	1	2	0	2	−2	1	

Source: FIFA
Rules for classification: Group stage tiebreakers
26 July 2012
12:00

Honduras	2–2	Morocco
Bengtson 56', 65' (pen.)	Report	Barrada 39'; Labyad 67'

Hampden Park, Glasgow
Attendance: 23,421
Referee: Pavel Královec (Czech Republic)

29 July 2012
19:45

Spain	0–1	Honduras
	Report	Bengtson 7'

St James' Park, Newcastle
Attendance: 26,523
Referee: Juan Soto (Venezuela)

1 August 2012
17:00

Japan	0–0	Honduras
	Report

City of Coventry Stadium, Coventry
Attendance: 25,862
Referee: Slim Jedidi (Tunisia)

Quarter-final

4 August 2012
17:00

Brazil	3–2	Honduras
Damião 38', 60'; Neymar 50' (pen.)	Report	Martínez 12'; Espinoza 48'

St James' Park, Newcastle
Attendance: 42,166
Referee: Felix Brych (Germany)

== Judo ==
Honduras has had 1 judoka invited.

Athlete	Event	Round of 64	Round of 32	Round of 16	Quarterfinals	Semifinals	Repechage	Final / BM	
Athlete	Event	Opposition Result	Opposition Result	Opposition Result	Opposition Result	Opposition Result	Opposition Result	Opposition Result	Rank
Kenny Godoy	Men's −60 kg	Gourouza (NIG); L 0000–0100	Did not advance						

== Shooting ==
Women

Athlete	Event	Qualification		Final	
Athlete	Event	Points	Rank	Points	Rank
Claudia Fajardo	10 m air pistol	348	48	Did not advance	

== Swimming ==
Men

Athlete	Event	Heat		Final	
Athlete	Event	Time	Rank	Time	Rank
Allan Gutiérrez	400 m freestyle	4:09.10	28	Did not advance	

Women

Athlete	Event	Heat		Semifinal		Final	
Athlete	Event	Time	Rank	Time	Rank	Time	Rank
Karen Vilorio	100 m backstroke	1:06.38	41	Did not advance			

== Weightlifting ==
Athlete	Event	Snatch		Clean & Jerk		Total	Rank
Athlete	Event	Result	Rank	Result	Rank	Total	Rank
Cristopher Pavón	Men's −94 kg	140	15	180	16	320	18

== Wrestling ==
Honduras has qualified one quota.

Key:

- VT - Victory by Fall.
- PP - Decision by Points - the loser with technical points.
- PO - Decision by Points - the loser without technical points.

Men's freestyle

Athlete	Event	Qualification	Round of 16	Quarterfinal	Semifinal	Repechage 1	Repechage 2	Final / BM	
Athlete	Event	Opposition Result	Opposition Result	Opposition Result	Opposition Result	Opposition Result	Opposition Result	Opposition Result	Rank
Brandon Escobar	−55 kg	Bye	Jaburyan (ARM); L 1–3 ^{PP}	Did not advance					12
