= Honduras at the 2024 World Aquatics Championships =

- Flag of Honduras
- FINA code: HON
- National federation: Federación Hondureña de Natación

in Doha, Qatar
- Competitors: 5 in 2 sports

World Aquatics Championships appearances
- 1973; 1975; 1978; 1982; 1986; 1991; 1994; 1998; 2001; 2003; 2005; 2007; 2009; 2011; 2013; 2015; 2017; 2019; 2022; 2023; 2024

Honduras competed at the 2024 World Aquatics Championships in Doha, Qatar from 2 to 18 February.

== Competitors ==
The following is the list of competitors in the Championships.

Sport	Men	Women	Total
Open water swimming	1*	0	1*
Swimming	2*	2	4*
Total	2*	2	4*

- Diego Dulieu competed in both open water swimming and pool swimming.

== Open water swimming ==
Men

Athlete	Event	Time	Rank
Diego Dulieu	Men's 5 km	53:50.6	28
Diego Dulieu	Men's 10 km	1:58:51.5	62

== Swimming ==
Honduras entered 4 swimmers.

Men

Athlete	Event	Heat		Semifinal		Final	
Athlete	Event	Time	Rank	Time	Rank	Time	Rank
Diego Dulieu	800 metre freestyle	8:11.97	36	—		Did not advance	
Diego Dulieu	1500 metre freestyle	15:36.02	27	—		Did not advance	
Julio Horrego	100 metre breaststroke	1:02.64	39	Did not advance			

Women

Athlete	Event	Heat		Semifinal		Final	
Athlete	Event	Time	Rank	Time	Rank	Time	Rank
Julimar Ávila	200 metre freestyle	2:04.43	35	Did not advance			
Julimar Ávila	200 metre butterfly	2:16.32	21	Did not advance			
Sara Pastrana	50 metre freestyle	28.11	67	Did not advance			
Sara Pastrana	100 metre freestyle	59.94	46	Did not advance			
