= Honduras at the 2017 World Aquatics Championships =

- Flag of Honduras
- FINA code: HON
- National federation: Federación Hondureña de Natación

in Budapest, Hungary
- Competitors: 4 in 1 sport
- Medals: Gold 0 Silver 0 Bronze 0 Total 0

World Aquatics Championships appearances
- 1973; 1975; 1978; 1982; 1986; 1991; 1994; 1998; 2001; 2003; 2005; 2007; 2009; 2011; 2013; 2015; 2017; 2019; 2022; 2023; 2024

Honduras competed at the 2017 World Aquatics Championships in Budapest, Hungary from 14 July to 30 July.

== Swimming ==
Honduras has received a Universality invitation from FINA to send a maximum of four swimmers (two men and two women) to the World Championships.

Athlete	Event	Heat		Semifinal		Final	
Athlete	Event	Time	Rank	Time	Rank	Time	Rank
Duran Alfonso	Men's 200 m freestyle	2:01.07	=68	did not advance			
Duran Alfonso	Men's 200 m butterfly	2:12.21	44	did not advance			
George Jabbour	Men's 50 m butterfly	26.69	65	did not advance			
George Jabbour	Men's 100 m butterfly	58.29	65	did not advance			
Julimar Avila	Women's 100 m freestyle	57.82	41	did not advance			
Julimar Avila	Women's 100 m butterfly	1:03.38	37	did not advance			
Karen Vilorio	Women's 50 m backstroke	31.10	51	did not advance			
Karen Vilorio	Women's 100 m backstroke	1:05.88	45	did not advance			
