= Honduras at the 2016 Summer Paralympics =

- IPC code: HON
- NPC: Honduran Paralympic Committee

in Rio de Janeiro
- Competitors: 2 in 2 sports
- Flag bearer: Emmanuel Díaz
- Medals: Gold 0 Silver 0 Bronze 0 Total 0

Summer Paralympics appearances (overview)
- 1996; 2000; 2004; 2008; 2012; 2016; 2020; 2024

Honduras sent a delegation to compete at the 2016 Summer Paralympics in Rio de Janeiro, Brazil, from 7–18 September 2016. This was the nation's sixth appearance at a Summer Paralympiad after it debuted at the 1996 Summer Paralympics. The Honduran delegation to Rio de Janeiro consisted of two athletes: powerlifter Gabriel Zelaya Díaz and short-distance swimmer Emmanuel Díaz. Both competitors were not ranked in their respective competitions after Gabriel Zelaya Díaz was unable to lift any weights in his three tries and Emmanuel Díaz was two minutes late arriving to his event.

== Background ==
Honduras debuted at the Paralympic Games at the 1996 Summer Paralympics. The country has participated in every Summer Paralympic Games since, making Rio de Janeiro the sixth time they have taken part in a Summer Paralympiad. At the close of the Rio Paralympics, Honduras had not won its first medal at the Paralympics. The 2016 Summer Paralympics were held from 7–18 September 2016 with a total of 4,328 athletes representing 159 National Paralympic Committees taking part. Honduras sent two athletes to compete at the Rio Paralympics, powerlifter Gabriel Zelaya Díaz and Emmanuel Díaz, a short-distance swimmer. Emmanuel Díaz was selected to be the flag bearer for the parade of nations during the opening ceremony.

== Disability classifications ==
Every participant at the Paralympics has their disability grouped into one of five disability categories; amputation, the condition may be congenital or sustained through injury or illness; cerebral palsy; wheelchair athletes, there is often overlap between this and other categories; visual impairment, including blindness; Les autres, any physical disability that does not fall strictly under one of the other categories, for example dwarfism or multiple sclerosis. Each Paralympic sport then has its own classifications, dependent upon the specific physical demands of competition. Events are given a code, made of numbers and letters, describing the type of event and classification of the athletes competing. Some sports, such as athletics, divide athletes by both the category and severity of their disabilities, other sports, for example swimming, group competitors from different categories together, the only separation being based on the severity of the disability.

== Powerlifting ==
Gabriel Zelaya Díaz was paralyzed as a consequence of being shot in the vertebral column and in the leg on 16 May 2004. He was 40 years old at the time of the Rio Paralympic Games and had limited experience competing in international powerlifting events. Zelaya Díaz qualified for the Games by receiving an invitation from the Bipartite Commission and partook in the men's −72 kg competition. On 11 September, he was up against nine other powerlifters for the top three placings in Riocentro. Zelaya Díaz was unsuccessful during his first try at lifting 100 kg (220 lb) and could not do the same for 105 kg (231 lb) at his second attempt. He waved to the crowd for encouragement just before his final try, but despite the increased support, was unable to record a mark. This meant Zelaya Díaz was not ranked by the judges in the competition. (Note: Four other athletes failed to set a mark.)

Athlete	Event	Result	Rank
Gabriel Zelaya Díaz	Men's −72 kg	NM	

== Swimming ==
Universidad Católica de Honduras student Emmanuel Díaz was 20 years old at the time of the Rio Summer Paralympics, and these Games were his second significant international competition, after the 2015 Parapan American Games. His disability is congenital; he was born with Myelomeningocele, a type of spina bifida, which has shortened his right leg by 2.5 cm (0.98 in) and has lost 80% of muscle strength in that limb. Emmanuel Díaz has undergone eleven surgeries to increase his mobility and took up swimming at the age of eight for health reasons. He is classified S7 by the International Paralympic Committee. Emmanuel Díaz qualified for the Games because of his performance at the 2015 Parapan American Games which placed him ninth in the American rankings and 72nd in the world standings. He trained for half a year to prepare for the Paralympics. Going into the Paralympics, Emmanuel Díaz said he wanted to create history and set a pattern, "The goal we have is the one God has prepared for us, on my part I do not set limits, it will be he who decides where and when he will write my story." He was due to compete in the second heat of the men's 50 metre freestyle S7 event on 9 September but was disqualified for arriving two minutes late because of a miscommunication between competition officials and members of the Honduran delegation.

Men

Athlete	Events	Heats		Final	
Athlete	Events	Time	Rank	Time	Rank
Emmanuel Díaz	50 m freestyle S7	DNS		did not advance	

== See also ==
- Honduras at the 2016 Summer Olympics
