= Honduras at the 1976 Summer Olympics =

- IOC code: HON
- NOC: Comité Olímpico Hondureño

in Montreal
- Competitors: 3
- Medals: Gold 0 Silver 0 Bronze 0 Total 0

Summer Olympics appearances (overview)
- 1968; 1972; 1976; 1980; 1984; 1988; 1992; 1996; 2000; 2004; 2008; 2012; 2016; 2020; 2024

Honduras competed at the 1976 Summer Olympics held in Montreal, Quebec, Canada, which were held from 18 July to 1 August 1976. This was the nation's second appearance since their debut in 1968 and after missing the 1972 Summer Olympics. The athlete delegation of the team consisted of three competitors, racewalker Santiago Fonseca and long-distance runners Hipólito López and Luis Raudales. Fonseca competed in the men's 20 kilometres walk and placed 27th overall. López and Raudales competed in the men's marathon and placed 41st and 49th, respectively.

== Background ==
The Honduran Olympic Committee was formed and recognized by the International Olympic Committee in 1956 though it first competed at the 1968 Summer Olympics held in Mexico City, Mexico. There, they sent six male athletes but none of them earned a medal. After missing the 1972 Summer Olympics held in Munich, Germany, the nation supplied a team for the 1976 Summer Olympics. The 1976 Summer Games were held in Montreal, Quebec, Canada, from 18 July to 1 August 1976. For this edition of the Summer Games, Honduras supplied three male athletes.

== Athletics ==
Racewalker Santiago Fonseca was the first competitor for the nation. He competed in the men's 20 kilometres walk on 23 July 1976 against 37 other racewalkers. There, he recorded a time of 1:36:07.0 and placed 27th.

Honduras had two athletes for the men's marathon, Hipólito López and Luis Raudales. They competed in the event on 31 July 1976 against 65 other competitors. There, López recorded a time of 2:26:00 and placed 41st while Raudales recorded a time of 2:29:25 and placed 49th.

Men's athletics summary
Athlete	Event	Final	
Athlete	Event	Time	Rank
Santiago Fonseca	20 km walk	1:36:07.0	27
Hipólito López	Marathon	2:26:00	41
Luis Raudales	Marathon	2:29:25	49
