= Juan José Piro =

Honduran swimmer

Personal information
- Full name: Juan José Piro

Sport
- Sport: Swimming

Juan José Piro or Juan José Pino is a Honduran swimmer. As a swimmer, he represented Honduras in international competition. He competed for Honduras at the 1984 Summer Olympics in six events but did not medal in any of them.

== Biography ==
Juan José Piro or Juan José Pino is Honduran. As a swimmer, he represented Honduras in international competition. Piro was selected to compete for Honduras at the 1984 Summer Olympics held in Los Angeles, United States, in six events: the men's 200 metre freestyle, men's 200 metre backstroke, men's 200 metre breaststroke, men's 400 metre individual medley, men's 4 × 100 metre medley relay, and men's 4 × 100 metre freestyle relay.

Piro first competed in the qualifying heats of the men's 200 metre freestyle on 29 July 1984 in the first heat against seven other competitors. There, he recorded a time of 2:12.51 and placed last, failing to advance to the finals as he was not within the top eight fastest swimmers. He then competed in the qualifying heats of the men's 400 metre individual medley the following day in the first heat against seven other competitors. There, he recorded a time of 5:15.68 and placed last, again failing to advance to the finals. His time was also the slowest amongst all of the competitors. His third event was the qualifying heats of the men's 200 metre backstroke held the next day in the third heat against six other competitors. There, he recorded a time of 2:32.48 and placed last, failing to advance to the finals.

His first team event was the men's 4 × 100 metre freestyle relay alongside his teammates Salvador Covelo, David Palma, and Rodolfo Torres. They competed in the second heat against six other relay teams, placing last with a time of 3:55.87. Piro then competed in his last individual event, competing in the qualifying heats of the men's 200 metre butterfly on 3 August in the third heat against seven other swimmers. There, he recorded a time of 2:22.80 and placed last, again failing to advance to the finals. His last event with his teammates was the men's 4 × 100 metre medley relay in the first qualifying heat. There, they recorded a time of 4:22.72 and placed last, failing to advance to the finals.
