= Honduras at the 2008 Summer Olympics =

- IOC code: HON
- NOC: Comité Olímpico Hondureño
- Website: cohonduras.com (in Spanish)

in Beijing
- Competitors: 25 in 5 sports
- Flag bearer: Miguel Ferrera
- Medals: Gold 0 Silver 0 Bronze 0 Total 0

Summer Olympics appearances (overview)
- 1968; 1972; 1976; 1980; 1984; 1988; 1992; 1996; 2000; 2004; 2008; 2012; 2016; 2020; 2024; 2028

Honduras sent a delegation to compete at the 2008 Summer Olympics in Beijing, China.

== Athletics ==
Key

- Note–Ranks given for track events are within the athlete's heat only
- Q = Qualified for the next round
- q = Qualified for the next round as a fastest loser or, in field events, by position without achieving the qualifying target
- NR = National record
- N/A = Round not applicable for the event
- Bye = Athlete not required to compete in round

Men

| Athlete | Event | Heat | | Quarterfinal | | Semifinal | | Final | |
| Athlete | Event | Result | Rank | Result | Rank | Result | Rank | Result | Rank |
|---|---|---|---|---|---|---|---|---|---|
| Rolando Palacios | 100 m | 10.49 | 4 | Did not advance | | | | | |
| Rolando Palacios | 200 m | 20.81 | 3 Q | 20.87 | 7 | Did not advance | | | |

Women

| Athlete | Event | Heat | | Semifinal | | Final | |
| Athlete | Event | Result | Rank | Result | Rank | Result | Rank |
|---|---|---|---|---|---|---|---|
| Jeimy Bernárdez | 100 m hurdles | 14.29 | 8 | Did not advance | | | |

== Football ==
Honduras under-23 men's national football team qualified as winners of the 2008 CONCACAF Men's Pre-Olympic Tournament and competed in Group D alongside Nigeria, Italy and South Korea.

=== Men's tournament ===
Roster

The following is the Honduras squad in the men's football tournament of the 2008 Summer Olympics.

Head coach: (Honduras) Gilberto Yearwood

| No. | Pos. | Player | Date of birth (age) | Caps | Goals | Club |
|---|---|---|---|---|---|---|
| 1 | GK | Kevin Hernández | 21 December 1985 (aged 22) | 0 | 0 | (National Autonomous Federation of Football of Honduras) Victoria |
| 2 | DF | Quiarol Arzu | 3 March 1985 (aged 23) | 0 | 0 | (National Autonomous Federation of Football of Honduras) Platense |
| 3 | DF | David Molina | 14 March 1988 (aged 20) | 0 | 0 | (National Autonomous Federation of Football of Honduras) Motagua |
| 4 | DF | Samuel Caballero* | 24 December 1974 (aged 33) | 0 | 0 | (Chinese Football Association) Changchun Yatai |
| 5 | DF | Erick Norales | 2 November 1985 (aged 22) | 0 | 0 | (National Autonomous Federation of Football of Honduras) Marathón |
| 6 | DF | Óscar Morales | 12 May 1986 (aged 22) | 0 | 0 | (National Autonomous Federation of Football of Honduras) Real España |
| 7 | MF | Emil Martínez* | 9 September 1982 (aged 25) | 0 | 0 | (Chinese Football Association) Shanghai Shenhua |
| 8 | MF | Rigoberto Padilla | 1 December 1985 (aged 22) | 0 | 0 | (National Autonomous Federation of Football of Honduras) Hispano |
| 9 | FW | Carlos Pavón* | 9 October 1973 (aged 34) | 0 | 0 | (National Autonomous Federation of Football of Honduras) Real España |
| 10 | MF | Ramón Núñez | 14 November 1985 (aged 22) | 0 | 0 | (National Autonomous Federation of Football of Honduras) Olimpia |
| 11 | FW | Luis Rodas | 3 January 1985 (aged 23) | 0 | 0 | (National Autonomous Federation of Football of Honduras) Motagua |
| 12 | MF | Jorge Claros | 8 January 1986 (aged 22) | 0 | 0 | (National Autonomous Federation of Football of Honduras) Motagua |
| 13 | MF | Hendry Thomas (c) | 23 February 1985 (aged 23) | 0 | 0 | (National Autonomous Federation of Football of Honduras) Olimpia |
| 14 | FW | Jefferson Bernardez | 27 March 1987 (aged 21) | 0 | 0 | (National Autonomous Federation of Football of Honduras) Motagua |
| 15 | FW | Luis López | 29 August 1986 (aged 21) | 0 | 0 | (National Autonomous Federation of Football of Honduras) Marathón |
| 16 | MF | Marvin Sánchez | 2 November 1986 (aged 21) | 0 | 0 | (National Autonomous Federation of Football of Honduras) Platense |
| 17 | DF | David Álvarez | 5 December 1985 (aged 22) | 0 | 0 | (National Autonomous Federation of Football of Honduras) Marathón |
| 18 | GK | Obed Enamorado | 15 September 1985 (aged 22) | 0 | 0 | (National Autonomous Federation of Football of Honduras) Vida |
| 20 | MF | Edder Delgado (Note: Replaces Erick Norales who was injured during the competition) | 20 November 1986 (aged 21) | 0 | 0 | (National Autonomous Federation of Football of Honduras) Real España |
| 21 | FW | José Guity (Note: Replaces Carlos Pavón who was injured during the competition) | 19 May 1985 (aged 23) | 0 | 0 | (National Autonomous Federation of Football of Honduras) Marathón |

* Over-aged player.

Notes

Group play

| Pos | Team | Pld | W | D | L | GF | GA | GD | Pts | Qualification |
|---|---|---|---|---|---|---|---|---|---|---|
| 1 | Italy | 3 | 2 | 1 | 0 | 6 | 0 | +6 | 7 | Qualified for the quarterfinals |
| 2 | Cameroon | 3 | 1 | 2 | 0 | 2 | 1 | +1 | 5 | Qualified for the quarterfinals |
| 3 | South Korea | 3 | 1 | 1 | 1 | 2 | 4 | −2 | 4 | |
| 4 | Honduras | 3 | 0 | 0 | 3 | 0 | 5 | −5 | 0 | |

7 August 2008
17:00

| Honduras | 0–3 | Italy |
|---|---|---|
| | Report | Giovinco 41'; Rossi 45' (pen.); Acquafresca 52' (pen.) |

Qinhuangdao Olympic Sports Center Stadium, Qinhuangdao
Attendance: 21,680
Referee: Damir Skomina (Slovenia)
10 August 2008
17:00

| Cameroon | 1–0 | Honduras |
|---|---|---|
| Mbia 74' | Report |

Qinhuangdao Olympic Sports Center Stadium, Qinhuangdao
Attendance: 28,657
Referee: Abdullah Al Hilali (Oman)
13 August 2008
17:00

| South Korea | 1–0 | Honduras |
|---|---|---|
| Kim Dong-jin 23' | Report |

Shanghai Stadium, Shanghai
Attendance: 34,160
Referee: Michael Hester (New Zealand)

== Rowing ==
Men

| Athlete | Event | Heats | | Quarterfinals | | Semifinals | | Final | |
| Athlete | Event | Time | Rank | Time | Rank | Time | Rank | Time | Rank |
|---|---|---|---|---|---|---|---|---|---|
| Norberto Bernárdez | Single sculls | 9:01.27 | 6 SE/F | Bye | | 8:29.65 | 4 FF | 8:32.22 | 31 |

Qualification Legend: FA=Final A (medal); FB=Final B (non-medal); FC=Final C (non-medal); FD=Final D (non-medal); FE=Final E (non-medal); FF=Final F (non-medal); SA/B=Semifinals A/B; SC/D=Semifinals C/D; SE/F=Semifinals E/F; QF=Quarterfinals; R=Repechage

== Swimming ==
Men

| Athlete | Event | Heat | | Semifinal | | Final | |
| Athlete | Event | Time | Rank | Time | Rank | Time | Rank |
|---|---|---|---|---|---|---|---|
| Javier Hernández Maradiaga | 200 m butterfly | 2:02.23 | 42 | Did not advance | | | |

Women

| Athlete | Event | Heat | | Semifinal | | Final | |
| Athlete | Event | Time | Rank | Time | Rank | Time | Rank |
|---|---|---|---|---|---|---|---|
| Sharon Fajardo | 50 m freestyle | 27.19 | 51 | Did not advance | | | |

== Taekwondo ==
| Athlete | Event | Round of 16 | Quarterfinals | Semifinals | Repechage | Bronze Medal | Final | |
| Athlete | Event | Opposition Result | Opposition Result | Opposition Result | Opposition Result | Opposition Result | Opposition Result | Rank |
|---|---|---|---|---|---|---|---|---|
| Miguel Ferrera | Men's −80 kg | Zhu G (CHN); L 1–3 | Did not advance | | | | | |

== See also ==
- Honduras at the 2007 Pan American Games
- Honduras at the 2010 Central American and Caribbean Games
