= Honduras at the 2011 World Aquatics Championships =

- Flag of Honduras
- FINA code: HON
- National federation: Federación Hondureña de Natación

in Shanghai, China
- Competitors: 4 in 1 sport
- Medals: Gold 0 Silver 0 Bronze 0 Total 0

World Aquatics Championships appearances
- 1973; 1975; 1978; 1982; 1986; 1991; 1994; 1998; 2001; 2003; 2005; 2007; 2009; 2011; 2013; 2015; 2017; 2019; 2022; 2023; 2024

Honduras competed at the 2011 World Aquatics Championships in Shanghai, China between July 16 and 31, 2011.

== Swimming ==
Honduras qualified 4 swimmers.

Men

Athlete	Event	Heats		Semifinals		Final	
Athlete	Event	Time	Rank	Time	Rank	Time	Rank
Allan Gutierrez	Men's 200 m Freestyle	1:56.74	50	did not advance			
Allan Gutierrez	Men's 400 m Freestyle	4:06.56	39			did not advance	
Javier Hernandez	Men's 50 m Butterfly	26.05	38	did not advance			
Javier Hernandez	Men's 100 m Butterfly	57.40	53	did not advance			

Women

Athlete	Event	Heats		Semifinals		Final	
Athlete	Event	Time	Rank	Time	Rank	Time	Rank
Karen Vilorio	Women's 100 m Backstroke	1:07.15	48	did not advance			
Karen Vilorio	Women's 200 m Backstroke	2:24.43	37	did not advance			
Ana Maria Castellanos	Women's 200 m Breaststroke	2:45.63	35	did not advance			
Ana Maria Castellanos	Women's 400 m IM	5:16.41	34			did not advance	
