= Honduras at the 2024 Summer Olympics =

- IOC code: HON
- NOC: Honduran Olympic Committee
- Website: cohonduras.com (in Spanish)

in Paris, France 26 July 2024 – 11 August 2024
- Competitors: 4 (3 men and 1 woman) in 3 sports
- Flag bearer (opening): Kevin Mejía & Julimar Ávila
- Flag bearer (closing): Kevin Mejía & Julimar Ávila
- Medals: Gold 0 Silver 0 Bronze 0 Total 0

Summer Olympics appearances (overview)
- 1968; 1972; 1976; 1980; 1984; 1988; 1992; 1996; 2000; 2004; 2008; 2012; 2016; 2020; 2024

Honduras competed at the 2024 Summer Olympics in Paris from 26 July to 11 August 2024. Honduran athletes have appeared in every edition of the Summer Olympic Games since Mexico City 1968, except for two occasions: Munich 1972 and Moscow 1980 as part of the US-led boycott. It was the nation's thirteenth consecutive appearance at the Summer Olympics.

== Competitors ==
The following is the list of number of competitors in the Games.

Sport	Men	Women	Total
Athletics	1	0	1
Swimming	1	1	2
Wrestling	1	0	1
Total	3	1	4

== Athletics ==
Hondurans track and field athletes achieved the entry standards for Paris 2024, either by passing the direct qualifying mark (or time for track and road races) or by world ranking, in the following events (a maximum of 3 athletes each):

Key

- Note–Ranks given for track events are within the athlete's heat only
- Q = Qualified for the next round
- q = Qualified for the next round as the fastest loser or, in field events, by position without achieving the qualifying target
- NR = National record
- N/A = Round not applicable for the event
- Bye = Athlete not required to compete in round

Track and road events

Athlete	Event	Preliminary		Round 1		Semifinal		Final	
Athlete	Event	Result	Rank	Result	Rank	Result	Rank	Result	Rank
Melique García	Men's 100 m	10.76	5	Did not advance					

== Swimming ==
Honduras sent two swimmers to compete at the 2024 Paris Olympics.

Athlete	Event	Heat		Semifinal		Final	
Athlete	Event	Time	Rank	Time	Rank	Time	Rank
Julio Horrego	Men's 200 m breaststroke	2:18.91	24	Did not advance			
Julimar Ávila	Women's 200 m freestyle	2:04.88	22	Did not advance			

== Wrestling ==
For the first time since 2012, Honduras qualified one wrestler for the following events. Kevin Mejía qualified through the 2024 Pan American Wrestling Olympic Qualification Tournament in Acapulco, Mexico.

Key:

- VT (ranking points: 5–0 or 0–5) – Victory by fall.
- VB (ranking points: 5–0 or 0–5) – Victory by injury (VF for forfeit, VA for withdrawal or disqualification)
- PP (ranking points: 3–1 or 1–3) – Decision by points – the loser with technical points.
- PO (ranking points: 3–0 or 0–3) – Decision by points – the loser without technical points.
- ST (ranking points: 4–0 or 0–4) – Great superiority – the loser without technical points and a margin of victory of at least 8 (Greco-Roman) or 10 (freestyle) points.
- SP (ranking points: 4–1 or 1–4) – Technical superiority – the loser with technical points and a margin of victory of at least 8 (Greco-Roman) or 10 (freestyle) points.

Greco-Roman

Athlete	Event	Round of 16	Quarterfinal	Semifinal	Repechage	Final / BM	
Athlete	Event	Opposition Result	Opposition Result	Opposition Result	Opposition Result	Opposition Result	Rank
Kevin Mejía	Men's −97 kg	Assakalov (UZB); L 3–5	Did not advance				

== See also ==
- Honduras at the 2023 Pan American Games
