= List of Honduran records in Olympic weightlifting =

The following are the records of Honduras in Olympic weightlifting. Records are maintained in each weight class for the snatch lift, clean and jerk lift, and the total for both lifts by the Honduras Weightlifting National Federation.

== Men ==
Event	Record	Athlete	Date	Meet	Place	Ref
55 kg
Snatch						
Clean & Jerk						
Total						
61 kg
Snatch						
Clean & Jerk						
Total						
67 kg
Snatch	75 kg	Jonathan Salvador	1 May 2025	World Junior Championships	Lima, Peru	
Clean & Jerk	90 kg	Jonathan Salvador	1 May 2025	World Junior Championships	Lima, Peru	
Total	165 kg	Jonathan Salvador	1 May 2025	World Junior Championships	Lima, Peru	
73 kg
Snatch	128 kg	Jorge Hernández	19 April 2023	Central American & Caribbean Championships	Santo Domingo, Dominican Republic	
Clean & Jerk	166 kg	Jorge Hernández	19 April 2023	Central American & Caribbean Championships	Santo Domingo, Dominican Republic	
Total	294 kg	Jorge Hernández	19 April 2023	Central American & Caribbean Championships	Santo Domingo, Dominican Republic	
81 kg
Snatch						
Clean & Jerk						
Total						
89 kg
Snatch	140 kg	Axel Pavón	10 September 2023	World Championships	Riyadh, Saudi Arabia	
Clean & Jerk	181 kg	Axel Pavón	10 September 2023	World Championships	Riyadh, Saudi Arabia	
Total	321 kg	Axel Pavón	10 September 2023	World Championships	Riyadh, Saudi Arabia	
96 kg
Snatch	148 kg	Axel Pavon	26 June 2023	CAC Games	San Salvador, El Salvador	
Clean & Jerk	188 kg	Axel Pavon	26 June 2023	CAC Games	San Salvador, El Salvador	
Total	336 kg	Axel Pavon	26 June 2023	CAC Games	San Salvador, El Salvador	
102 kg
Snatch	151 kg	Christopher Pavón	26 April 2019	Pan American Championships	Guatemala City, Guatemala	
Clean & Jerk	185 kg	Christopher Pavón	26 April 2019	Pan American Championships	Guatemala City, Guatemala	
Total	336 kg	Christopher Pavón	26 April 2019	Pan American Championships	Guatemala City, Guatemala	
109 kg
Snatch						
Clean & Jerk						
Total						
+109 kg
Snatch						
Clean & Jerk						
Total						

== Women ==
Event	Record	Athlete	Date	Meet	Place	Ref
45 kg
Snatch						
Clean and Jerk						
Total						
49 kg
Snatch						
Clean and Jerk						
Total						
55 kg
Snatch	82 kg	Sofia Aleman	24 June 2023	CAC Games	San Salvador, El Salvador	
Clean and Jerk	92 kg	Sofia Aleman	24 June 2023	CAC Games	San Salvador, El Salvador	
Total	174 kg	Sofia Aleman	24 June 2023	CAC Games	San Salvador, El Salvador	
59 kg
Snatch	75 kg	Sofia Aleman	10 June 2023	IWF Grand Prix	Havana, Cuba	
Clean & Jerk	90 kg	Sofia Aleman	10 June 2023	IWF Grand Prix	Havana, Cuba	
Total	165 kg	Sofia Aleman	10 June 2023	IWF Grand Prix	Havana, Cuba	
64 kg
Snatch						
Clean and Jerk						
Total						
71 kg
Snatch	70 kg	Dayanira James	14 June 2023	IWF Grand Prix	Havana, Cuba	
Clean and Jerk	93 kg	Dayanira James	14 June 2023	IWF Grand Prix	Havana, Cuba	
Total	163 kg	Dayanira James	14 June 2023	IWF Grand Prix	Havana, Cuba	
76 kg
Snatch						
Clean and Jerk						
Total						
81 kg
Snatch						
Clean and Jerk						
Total						
87 kg
Snatch						
Clean and Jerk						
Total						
+87 kg
Snatch						
Clean and Jerk						
Total						
