= David Palma =

Honduran swimmer

Personal information
- Full name: David Abraham Galo Palma

Sport
- Sport: Swimming

David Abraham Galo Palma is a Honduran swimmer. As a swimmer, he represented Honduras in international competition. He was selected to compete for Honduras at the 1984 Summer Olympics in four events, not medaling in any of the events he was entered in.

== Biography ==
David Abraham Galo Palma is Honduran. As a swimmer, he represented Honduras in international competition. Palma was selected to compete for Honduras at the 1984 Summer Olympics held in Los Angeles, United States. For the 1984 Summer Games, he was entered to compete in four different events: the men's 100 metre backstroke, men's 200 metre breaststroke, men's 4 × 100 metre freestyle relay, and men's 4 × 100 metre medley relay.

The swimming events were held at the McDonald's Olympic Swim Stadium. Palma first competed in the qualifying heats of the men's 200 metre breaststroke on 2 August 1984 at 9:45 a.m. in the first heat against six other swimmers. There, he recorded a time of 2:37.65 and placed sixth, failing to advance to the finals as he was not within the top eight swimmers in the event. An hour later, he competed in the men's 4 × 100 metre freestyle relay with his teammates Salvador Corelo, Juan José Piro, and Rodolfo Torres. They competed in the second qualifying heat against seven other teams and recorded a time of 3:55.87, placing seventh and failing to advance further.

The following day on 3 August, he competed in the men's 100 metre backstroke in the first qualifying heat against three other swimmers. There, he recorded a time of 1:13.28 and placed last, failing to advance further. His last event was men's 4 × 100 metre medley relay alongside his teammates; they competed in the first qualifying heat against six other relay teams. There, they recorded a time of 4:22.72 and placed last, failing to advance to the finals of the event.
