= Honduras at the 1984 Summer Olympics =

- IOC code: HON
- NOC: Comité Olímpico Hondureño

in Los Angeles
- Competitors: 10
- Flag bearer: Carlos Soto
- Medals: Gold 0 Silver 0 Bronze 0 Total 0

Summer Olympics appearances (overview)
- 1968; 1972; 1976; 1980; 1984; 1988; 1992; 1996; 2000; 2004; 2008; 2012; 2016; 2020; 2024

Honduras competed at the 1984 Summer Olympics in Los Angeles, United States. The nation returned to the Olympic Games after participating in the American-led boycott of the 1980 Summer Olympics.

== Results by event ==
=== Athletics ===
Men's Marathon

- Carlos Avila

- Final — 2:42:03 (→ 71st place)

Men's 20 km Walk

- Santiago Folseca

- Final — 1:34:47 (→ 31st place)

Women's Marathon

- Leda Díaz de Cano

- Final — did not finish (→ no ranking)

=== Swimming ===
Men's 100m Freestyle

- Rodolfo Torres

- Heat — 1:00.92 (→ did not advance, 64th place)

Men's 200m Freestyle

- Juan José Piro

- Heat — 2:12.51 (→ did not advance, 52nd place)

Men's 100m Backstroke

- David Palma

- Heat — 1:13.28 (→ did not advance, 43rd place)

Men's 200m Backstroke

- Juan José Piro

- Heat — 2:32.48 (→ did not advance, 34th place)

Men's 100m Breaststroke

- Salvador Corelo

- Heat — DSQ (→ did not advance, no ranking)

Men's 200m Breaststroke

- David Palma

- Heat — 2:37.65 (→ did not advance, 42nd place)

Men's 100m Butterfly

- Salvador Corelo

- Heat — 1:05.91 (→ did not advance, 49th place)

Men's 200m Butterfly

- Juan José Piro

- Heat — 2:22.80 (→ did not advance, 33rd place)

Men's 200m Individual Medley

- Salvador Corelo

- Heat — 2:22.29 (→ did not advance, 36th place)

Men's 400m Individual Medley

- Juan José Piro

- Heat — 5:15.68 (→ did not advance, 23rd place)

Men's 4 × 100 m Freestyle Relay

- Salvador Covelo, Juan José Piro, David Palma, and Rodolfo Torres

- Heat — 3:55.87 (→ did not advance, 22nd place)

Men's 4 × 100 m Medley Relay

- Salvador Corelo, David Palma, Juan José Piro, and Rodolfo Torres

- Heat — 4:22.72 (→ did not advance, 20th place)

Women's 100m Freestyle

- María Lardizajal

- Heat — 1:07.80 (→ did not advance, 45th place)

Women's 200m Freestyle

- María Lardizajal

- Heat — 2:28.25 (→ did not advance, 36th place)
