= Honduras at the 2024 Summer Paralympics =

- IPC code: HON

in Paris, France August 28, 2024 – September 8, 2024
- Competitors: 1 in 1 sport
- Flag bearer: Olvin Cruz
- Medals: Gold 0 Silver 0 Bronze 0 Total 0

Summer Paralympics appearances (overview)
- 1996; 2000; 2004; 2008; 2012; 2016; 2020; 2024

Honduras competed at the 2024 Summer Paralympics in Paris, France, from 28 August to 8 September 2024. This was the nation's eighth time competing at the Summer Paralympic Games after it made its debut at the 1996 Summer Paralympics. The delegation consisted of only one competitor from one sport.

== Competitors ==
The following is the list of number of competitors in the Games.

Sport	Men	Women	Total
Swimming	1	0	1
Total	1	0	1

== Swimming ==
Athlete	Event	Heat		Final	
Athlete	Event	Result	Rank	Result	Rank
Olvin Cruz	Men's 50 metre freestyle S7	51.61	13	Did not advance	

== See also ==
- Honduras at the 2024 Summer Olympics
- Honduras at the Paralympics
