= Honduras at the 2020 Summer Paralympics =

- Flag of Honduras
- IPC code: HON

in Tokyo, Japan August 24, 2021 – September 5, 2021
- Competitors: 1 (1 man and 0 women) in 1 sport and 2 events
- Flag bearer: Carlos Velasquez
- Medals: Gold 0 Silver 0 Bronze 0 Total 0

Summer Paralympics appearances (overview)
- 1996; 2000; 2004; 2008; 2012; 2016; 2020; 2024

Honduras competed at the 2020 Summer Paralympics in Tokyo, Japan, from 24 August to 5 September 2021. This was their seventh consecutive appearance at the Summer Paralympics since 1996.

== Competitors ==
The following is the list of number of competitors participating in the Games:

Sport	Men	Women	Total
Athletics	1	0	1
Total	1	0	1

== Athletics ==
SB: Season Best | DNA: Did not advance

Men's track

Athlete	Event	Heats		Final	
Athlete	Event	Result	Rank	Result	Rank
Carlos Velasquez	100 m T38	13.81 SB	7	Did not advance	
Carlos Velasquez	400 m T38	1:03.06 SB	6	Did not advance	

== See also ==
- Honduras at the Paralympics
- Honduras at the 2020 Summer Olympics
