= Honduras at the 2023 World Aquatics Championships =

- Flag of Honduras
- FINA code: HON
- National federation: Federación Hondureña de Natación

in Fukuoka, Japan
- Competitors: 3 in 1 sport
- Medals: Gold 0 Silver 0 Bronze 0 Total 0

World Aquatics Championships appearances
- 1973; 1975; 1978; 1982; 1986; 1991; 1994; 1998; 2001; 2003; 2005; 2007; 2009; 2011; 2013; 2015; 2017; 2019; 2022; 2023; 2024

Honduras is set to compete at the 2023 World Aquatics Championships in Fukuoka, Japan from 14 to 30 July.

== Swimming ==
Honduras entered 4 swimmers.

Men

Athlete	Event	Heat		Semifinal		Final	
Athlete	Event	Time	Rank	Time	Rank	Time	Rank
Julio Horrego	100 metre breaststroke	1:03.04	43	Did not advance			
Julio Horrego	200 metre breaststroke	2:20.70	37	Did not advance			
Gabriel Martinez	50 metre freestyle	23.52	63	Did not advance			
Gabriel Martinez	100 metre freestyle	51.10	56	Did not advance			

Women

Athlete	Event	Heat		Semifinal		Final	
Athlete	Event	Time	Rank	Time	Rank	Time	Rank
Julimar Ávila	200 metre freestyle	2:06.92	48	Did not advance			
Julimar Ávila	100 metre butterfly	1:03.52	43	Did not advance			
