= Isabel Lardizábal =

Honduran swimmer (born 1968)

Personal information
- Full name: Isabel Cristina Lardizábal-Roldan
- Nationality: Honduran and American
- Born: Isabel Cristina Lardizábal; 15 February 1968 (age 58) Tegucigalpa, Honduras

Sport
- Sport: Swimming

Isabel Cristina Lardizábal-Roldan (born 15 February 1968) is a Honduran and American swimmer. She competed for Honduras at the 1984 Summer Olympics and competed in two events. After the Summer Games, she enrolled at Florida Atlantic University and joined the swim team. With the team, she was awarded All-American honors during the 1986–87 season.

== Biography ==
Isabel Cristina Lardizábal was born on 15 February 1968 in Miami, Florida, United States, to Honduran parents. Her twin sister, María Lardizábal, was also a swimmer.

Lardizábal was selected to compete for Honduras at the 1984 Summer Olympics held in Los Angeles, United States. At the 1984 Summer Games, she was entered in two events, the women's 100 metre breaststroke and women's 200 metre breaststroke. She first competed in the qualifying heats of the women's 200 metres breaststroke on 30 July in the second heat against seven other swimmers. There, she recorded a time of 3:04.26 and placed last, failing to advance further as only the eight fastest swimmers could advance to Final A. She then competed in the qualifying heats of the women's 100 metres breaststroke on 2 August in the third heat against seven other swimmers. There, she recorded a time of 1:25.12 and placed seventh, failing to advance further as only the eight fastest swimmers could advance to Final A.

After the 1984 Summer Games, she enrolled at Florida Atlantic University (FAU) with her sister and joined the swim team. During the 1986–87 season, she was awarded All-American honors alongside her relay teammates Laurence Bensimon, Carol Gushwa, and Tracey Hughes. In 1990 during the FAU's first sport awards banquet, she was awarded for her sportsmanship in the sport of swimming.
