= Honduras at the 1988 Summer Olympics =

- IOC code: HON
- NOC: Comité Olímpico Hondureño

in Seoul
- Competitors: 8 (7 men and 1 woman) in 3 sports
- Flag bearer: Santiago Fonseca
- Medals: Gold 0 Silver 0 Bronze 0 Total 0

Summer Olympics appearances (overview)
- 1968; 1972; 1976; 1980; 1984; 1988; 1992; 1996; 2000; 2004; 2008; 2012; 2016; 2020; 2024

Honduras competed at the 1988 Summer Olympics in Seoul, South Korea.

== Competitors ==
The following is the list of number of competitors in the Games.

Sport	Men	Women	Total
Athletics	3	0	3
Boxing	2	–	2
Swimming	2	1	3
Total	7	1	8

== Athletics ==
Men
Track and road events

Athlete	Event	Heat Round 1		Heat Round 2		Semifinal		Final	
Athlete	Event	Time	Rank	Time	Rank	Time	Rank	Time	Rank
Jorge Fidel Ponce	400 metres	51.11	68	Did not advance					
Jorge Fidel Ponce	400 metres hurdles	55.38	36	—N/a		Did not advance			
Santiago Fonseca	20 kilometres walk	—N/a						1:27:41	40
Rafael Valladares	20 kilometres walk	—N/a						1:37:09	48

== Boxing ==
Athlete	Event	Round of 64	Round of 32	Round of 16	Quarterfinals	Semifinals	Final	
Athlete	Event	Opposition Result	Opposition Result	Opposition Result	Opposition Result	Opposition Result	Opposition Result	Rank
Darwin Angeles	Light flyweight	Bye	Stewart (LBR); L 0–5	Did not advance				
Roberto Martínez	Middleweight	Bye	Hukkanen (FIN); L 0–5	Did not advance				

== Swimming ==
Men

Athlete	Event	Heats		Final A/B	
Athlete	Event	Time	Rank	Time	Rank
Pablo Barahona	50 metre freestyle	25.79	58	Did not advance	
Pablo Barahona	100 metre freestyle	57.97	68	Did not advance	
Pablo Barahona	100 metre backstroke	1:03.90	46	Did not advance	
Pablo Barahona	200 metre backstroke	2:21.61	38	Did not advance	
Plutarco Castellanos	50 metre freestyle	26.00	60	Did not advance	
Plutarco Castellanos	100 metre freestyle	56.11	64	Did not advance	
Plutarco Castellanos	100 metre butterfly	1:02.69	47	Did not advance	

Women

Athlete	Event	Heats		Final A/B	
Athlete	Event	Time	Rank	Time	Rank
Ana Fortin	50 metre freestyle	28.46	38	Did not advance	
Ana Fortin	100 metre freestyle	1:01.11	44	Did not advance	
Ana Fortin	100 metre backstroke	1:10.10	33	Did not advance	
Ana Fortin	200 metre backstroke	2:32.13	29	Did not advance	
Ana Fortin	100 metre butterfly	1:07.99	35	Did not advance	
