= Honduras at the 2008 Summer Paralympics =

- IPC code: HON
- NPC: Honduran Paralympic Committee

in Beijing
- Competitors: 1 in 1 sport
- Flag bearer: Luis Hernandez
- Medals: Gold 0 Silver 0 Bronze 0 Total 0

Summer Paralympics appearances (overview)
- 1996; 2000; 2004; 2008; 2012; 2016; 2020; 2024

Honduras sent a delegation to compete at the 2008 Summer Paralympics in Beijing, People's Republic of China.

== Athletics ==
Athlete	Event	Heats		Semifinal		Final	
Athlete	Event	Result	Rank	Result	Rank	Result	Rank
Luis Hernandez	Men's 100 metres T11	13.06	24	did not advance			

== See also ==
- Honduras at the Paralympics
- Honduras at the 2008 Summer Olympics
