= Honduras at the 1992 Summer Olympics =

- IOC code: HON
- NOC: Comité Olímpico Hondureño
- Website: cohonduras.com (in Spanish)

in Barcelona
- Competitors: 10 (7 men and 3 women) in 4 sports
- Medals: Gold 0 Silver 0 Bronze 0 Total 0

Summer Olympics appearances (overview)
- 1968; 1972; 1976; 1980; 1984; 1988; 1992; 1996; 2000; 2004; 2008; 2012; 2016; 2020; 2024

Honduras competed at the 1992 Summer Olympics in Barcelona, Spain. Ten competitors, seven men and three women, took part in 25 events in 4 sports.

== Competitors ==
The following is the list of number of competitors in the Games.

Sport	Men	Women	Total
Athletics	4	0	4
Fencing	0	1	1
Swimming	2	2	4
Weightlifting	1	–	1
Total	7	3	10

== Athletics ==
Men's 100 metres

- Jaime Zelaya

- Heat — 11.02 (→ did not advance)

Men's 5,000 metres

- Polin Belisle

- Heat — did not start (→ did not advance)

Men's Triple Jump

- Luis Flores

- Qualification — 15.08 m (→ did not advance)

Men's Decathlon

- Jorge Maradiaga

- 100 metres — 11.75
- Long jump — 6.18
- Shot put — 9.54
- High jump — 1.70
- 400 metres — 54.81
- 110m hurdles — 16.20
- Discus throw — 30.26
- Pole vault — 4.00
- Javelin throw — 42.46
- 1,500 metres — 5:04.10

- Final Standings — 5.746 (→ 28 place)

== Fencing ==
One female fencer represented Honduras in 1992.

Women's foil

- Elvia Reyes

== Swimming ==
- Plutarco Castellanos
- Salvador Jiménez
- Ana Fortin
- Claudia Fortin

== Weightlifting ==
- Osman Manzanares

== See also ==
- Honduras at the 1991 Pan American Games
- Honduras at the 1993 Central American and Caribbean Games
