= Honduras at the Paralympics =

- IPC code: HON
- NPC: Honduran Paralympic Committee
- Medals: Gold 0 Silver 0 Bronze 0 Total 0

Summer appearances
- 1996; 2000; 2004; 2008; 2012; 2016; 2020; 2024

Honduras made its Paralympic Games début at the 1996 Summer Paralympics in Atlanta, with a two-man delegation in track and field. It has competed in every subsequent edition of the Summer Paralympics, but never in the Winter Paralympics. Honduran delegations have always been small, never including more than two competitors. All Honduran Paralympians have been runners, and none has won a Paralympic medal so far.

== See also ==
- Honduras at the Olympics
