= Taekwondo at the 2011 Pan American Games – Men's 80 kg =

Taekwondo – Men's 80 kg at the 2011 Pan American Games
- Venue: CODE II Gymnasium
- Dates: October 17
- Competitors: 15 from 15 nations

Medalists
Gold medal	Sebastián Crismanich	Argentina
Silver medal	Carlos Vásquez	Venezuela
Bronze medal	Uriel Adriano	Mexico
Bronze medal	Stuardo Solorzano	Guatemala

The men's 80 kg competition of the taekwondo events at the 2011 Pan American Games took place on the 17 of October at the CODE II Gymnasium. The defending Pan American Games champion is Ángel Matos of Cuba, while the defending Pan American Championship, champion is Sébastien Michaud of Canada.

== Schedule ==
All times are Central Standard Time (UTC−6).

Date	Time	Round
October 17, 2011	11:00	Preliminaries
October 17, 2011	12:30	Quarterfinals
October 17, 2011	17:00	Semifinals
October 17, 2011	18:00	Final

== Results ==
Legend

- PTG — Won by Points Gap
- SUP — Won by Superiority
- OT — Won on over time (Golden Point)
- KO — Won by knockout

=== Main bracket ===
Preliminary round
Sebastián Crismanich (ARG)	12
Michael Rodriguez (NCA)	0
Mario Tellez (CUB)	8
Stuardo Solorzano (GUA)	9
Jahmar Jean-Marie (ISV)	3
Stuart Smit (ARU)	15
Carlos Liebig (CHI)	12
Wilkin Heredia (DOM)	10
Carlos Vásquez (VEN)	15
Lenn Hypolite (TRI)	3
Timothy Curry (USA)	8
Douglas Marcelino (BRA)	5
Timothy Curry (COL)	5
Uriel Adriano (MEX)	6

Quarterfinals
Sébastien Michaud (CAN)
Sebastián Crismanich (ARG)	KO
Stuardo Solorzano (GUA)	4 (SUP)
Stuart Smit (ARU)	4
Carlos Liebig (CHI)	3
Carlos Vásquez (VEN)	14
Timothy Curry (USA)	13
Uriel Adriano (MEX)	20

Semifinals
Sebastián Crismanich (ARG)	8
Stuardo Solorzano (GUA)	1
Carlos Vásquez (VEN)	9
Uriel Adriano (MEX)	8

Gold medal match
Sebastián Crismanich (ARG)	12
Carlos Vásquez (VEN)	9
