= Honduras at the 2004 Summer Paralympics =

- IPC code: HON
- NPC: Honduran Paralympic Committee

in Athens
- Competitors: 2 in 1 sport
- Flag bearer: Mario Madriz
- Medals: Gold 0 Silver 0 Bronze 0 Total 0

Summer Paralympics appearances (overview)
- 1996; 2000; 2004; 2008; 2012; 2016; 2020; 2024

Honduras competed at the 2004 Summer Paralympics in Athens, Greece. The team included two athletes, one man and one woman, neither of whom won a medal.

== Sports ==
=== Athletics ===
==== Men's track ====
Athlete	Class	Event	Heats		Semifinal		Final	
Athlete	Class	Event	Result	Rank	Result	Rank	Result	Rank
Mario Madriz	T54	100m	19.74	30	did not advance			

==== Women's track ====
Athlete	Class	Event	Heats		Semifinal		Final	
Athlete	Class	Event	Result	Rank	Result	Rank	Result	Rank
Lilian Suazo	T11	100m	20.40	11	did not advance			

== See also ==
- Honduras at the Paralympics
- Honduras at the 2004 Summer Olympics
