= Ifeoma Mbanugo =

Nigerian long-distance runner

Personal information
- Nationality: Nigerian
- Born: 3 March 1952 (age 74)

Sport
- Sport: Long-distance running
- Event: Marathon

Ifeoma Mbanugo (born 3 March 1952) is a Nigerian long-distance runner. She competed in the women's marathon at the 1984 Summer Olympics.
