= Naydi Nazario =

Puerto Rican long-distance runner

Naydi Nazario (born September 10, 1956) is a retired female long-distance runner from Puerto Rico. She competed for her native country at the 1984 Summer Olympics in Los Angeles, California. There she ended up in 33rd place in the women's marathon. Nazario set her personal best in the classic distance (2:45.49) in 1984.

== Achievements ==
Year	Competition	Venue	Position	Event	Notes
Representing Puerto Rico
1984	Olympic Games	Los Angeles, United States	33rd	Marathon	2:45:49
