= Carlos Vásquez (taekwondo) =

Venezuelan taekwondo practitioner

Personal information
- Full name: Carlos Armando Vásquez Carvajal
- Nationality: Venezuela
- Born: 19 December 1982 (age 43)
- Height: 1.90 m (6 ft 3 in)
- Weight: 78 kg (172 lb)

Sport
- Sport: Taekwondo
- Event: 80 kg
Medal record
Men's taekwondo
Representing Venezuela
Pan American Games
Silver medal – second place	2011 Guadalajara	80 kg
World Championships
Bronze medal – third place	2005 Madrid	72 kg

Carlos Armando Vásquez Carvajal (born December 19, 1982) is a Venezuelan taekwondo practitioner.

== Career ==
He won the bronze medal for the 72 kg class at the 2005 World Taekwondo Championships in Madrid, Spain, and silver for the 80 kg class at the 2011 Pan American Games in Guadalajara, Mexico.

Vasquez qualified for the men's 80 kg class at the 2008 Summer Olympics in Beijing, after placing third from the Pan American Qualification Tournament in Cali, Colombia. He defeated Gabon's Lionel Baguissi by a unanimous decision in the preliminary round, before losing out his next match to Great Britain's Aaron Cook, with a final score of 2–5.
