= Honduras at the 2019 World Aquatics Championships =

- Flag of Honduras
- FINA code: HON
- National federation: Federación Hondureña de Natación

in Gwangju, South Korea
- Competitors: 4 in 1 sport
- Medals: Gold 0 Silver 0 Bronze 0 Total 0

World Aquatics Championships appearances
- 1973; 1975; 1978; 1982; 1986; 1991; 1994; 1998; 2001; 2003; 2005; 2007; 2009; 2011; 2013; 2015; 2017; 2019; 2022; 2023; 2024

Honduras competed at the 2019 World Aquatics Championships in Gwangju, South Korea from 12 to 28 July.

== Swimming ==
Honduras entered four swimmers.

Men

Athlete	Event	Heat		Semifinal		Final	
Athlete	Event	Time	Rank	Time	Rank	Time	Rank
Marco Flores	50 m freestyle	23.71	68	did not advance			
Marco Flores	50 m breaststroke	29.09	50	did not advance			
Julio Horrego	100 m breaststroke	1:03.55	57	did not advance			
Julio Horrego	200 m individual medley	2:11.10	47	did not advance			

Women

Athlete	Event	Heat		Semifinal		Final	
Athlete	Event	Time	Rank	Time	Rank	Time	Rank
Julimar Avila	100 m butterfly	1:03.64	41	did not advance			
Julimar Avila	200 m individual medley	2:20.93	31	did not advance			
Sara Pastrana	200 m freestyle	2:06.76	40	did not advance			
Sara Pastrana	400 m freestyle	4:27.65	34	—		did not advance	
