= Honduras at the Olympics =

- IOC code: HON
- NOC: Comité Olímpico Hondureño
- Website: cohonduras.com (in Spanish)
- Medals: Gold 0 Silver 0 Bronze 0 Total 0

Summer appearances
- 1968; 1972; 1976; 1980; 1984; 1988; 1992; 1996; 2000; 2004; 2008; 2012; 2016; 2020; 2024; 2028

Winter appearances
- 1992; 1994–2026

Honduras has competed in thirteen editions of the Summer Olympic Games. The nation competed at the Winter Olympic Games in 1992, but has yet to appear since then as of 2026. Honduran athletes have never won a medal; their best performance was fourth place by the national under-23 football team in the men's tournament at the 2016 Summer Olympics.

The Comité Olímpico Hondureño was formed in 1956 and was recognized by the International Olympic Committee the same year. Though, it would not be until 1968 where they supplied a delegation.

== History ==
Participation of Honduran athletes in the Olympics is sanctioned by its National Olympic Committee (NOC). Its NOC is the Honduran Olympic Committee (Spanish: Comité Olímpico Hondureño) which was formed in 1956 and was recognized by the International Olympic Committee that same year on 20 November during the 52nd IOC session held in Melbourne, Australia.

Despite being recognized in 1956, it would not be until the 1968 Summer Olympics held in Mexico City, Mexico, where a Honduran team would be competing. There, they supplied a delegation of six competitors, all in the sport of athletics. None of them earned a medal. The nation has competed at every edition of the Summer Olympics besides the 1972 Summer Olympics held in Munich, Germany, and the 1980 Summer Olympics held in Moscow in response to the Soviet invasion of Afghanistan.

The nation has also competed at one edition of the Winter Olympics, the 1992 Winter Olympics held in Albertville, France, where they supplied cross-country skier Jenny Palacios-Stillo. They have not competed in a Winter Olympics since then. Honduras has never won an Olympic medal; its highest position as of the 2024 Summer Olympics is a fourth place finish in the men's football tournament at the 2016 Summer Olympics held in Rio de Janeiro, Brazil.

== Medal tables ==
=== Medals by Summer Games ===
| Games | Athletes | Gold | Silver | Bronze | Total | Rank |
| 1968 Mexico City | 6 | 0 | 0 | 0 | 0 | – |
| (West Germany) 1972 Munich | did not participate | | | | | |
| (Canada) 1976 Montreal | 3 | 0 | 0 | 0 | 0 | – |
| (Soviet Union) 1980 Moscow | boycotted | | | | | |
| (United States) 1984 Los Angeles | 10 | 0 | 0 | 0 | 0 | – |
| (South Korea) 1988 Seoul | 8 | 0 | 0 | 0 | 0 | – |
| (Spain) 1992 Barcelona | 10 | 0 | 0 | 0 | 0 | – |
| (United States) 1996 Atlanta | 7 | 0 | 0 | 0 | 0 | – |
| (Australia) 2000 Sydney | 20 | 0 | 0 | 0 | 0 | – |
| (Greece) 2004 Athens | 5 | 0 | 0 | 0 | 0 | – |
| (China) 2008 Beijing | 25 | 0 | 0 | 0 | 0 | – |
| (United Kingdom) 2012 London | 27 | 0 | 0 | 0 | 0 | – |
| (Brazil) 2016 Rio de Janeiro | 25 | 0 | 0 | 0 | 0 | – |
| (Japan) 2020 Tokyo | 27 | 0 | 0 | 0 | 0 | – |
| (France) 2024 Paris | 4 | 0 | 0 | 0 | 0 | – |
| (United States) 2028 Los Angeles | future event | | | | | |
| (Australia) 2032 Brisbane | future event | | | | | |
| Total | | 0 | 0 | 0 | 0 | – |

=== Medals by Winter Games ===
| Games | Athletes | Gold | Silver | Bronze | Total | Rank |
| (France) 1992 Albertville | 1 | 0 | 0 | 0 | 0 | – |
| 1994–2026 | did not participate | | | | | |
| (France) 2030 French Alps | future event | | | | | |
| (United States) 2034 Utah | future event | | | | | |
| Total | | 0 | 0 | 0 | 0 | – |

== See also ==
- List of flag bearers for Honduras at the Olympics
- Tropical nations at the Winter Olympics
- Honduras at the Paralympics
