= María Lardizábal =

Honduran swimmer (born 1968)

Personal information
- Full name: María Antonia Lardizábal-Krogh
- Born: María Antonia Lardizábal; 15 February 1968 (age 58) Tegucigalpa, Honduras

Sport
- Sport: Swimming

María Antonia Lardizábal-Krogh (born 15 February 1968) is a Honduran and American swimmer. She competed in two events at the 1984 Summer Olympics. She competed for Honduras at the 1984 Summer Olympics and competed in two events. After the Summer Games, she enrolled at Florida Atlantic University and joined the swim team. With the team, she became the co-captain and was a three-time letter winner.

== Biography ==
María Antonia Lardizábal was born on 15 February 1968 in Miami, Florida, United States, to Honduran parents. Her twin sister, Isabel Lardizábal, was also a swimmer.

Lardizábal was selected to compete for Honduras at the 1984 Summer Olympics held in Los Angeles, United States. At the 1984 Summer Games, she was entered in two events, the women's 100 metre freestyle and women's 200 metre freestyle. She first competed in the qualifying heats of the women's 100 metre freestyle on 29 July 1984 in the fourth heat against seven other swimmers. There, she recorded a time of 1:07.80 and placed last in her heat, failing to advance further into the finals and her time being the slowest across all of the swimmers that competed in the event. Though, with her participation in the event, she became the first woman to compete for Honduras at any edition of the Olympic Games. She then competed in the qualifying heats of the women's 200 metre freestyle the following day in the third heat against seven other swimmers. There, she recorded a time of 2:28.25 and again placed last in her heat, failing to advance further into the finals and her time being the slowest across all of the swimmers that competed in the event.

After the 1984 Summer Games, she enrolled at Florida Atlantic University (FAU) with her sister and joined the swim team. By her senior year at FAU, she was the co-captain of the swim team and a three-time letter winner.
