= Honduras at the 2020 Summer Olympics =

- IOC code: HON
- NOC: Honduran Olympic Committee
- Website: cohonduras.com (in Spanish)

in Tokyo, Japan July 23, 2021 – August 8, 2021
- Competitors: 27 in 5 sports
- Flag bearers (opening): Keyla Ávila; Julio Horrego
- Flag bearer (closing): Iván Zarco
- Medals: Gold 0 Silver 0 Bronze 0 Total 0

Summer Olympics appearances (overview)
- 1968; 1972; 1976; 1980; 1984; 1988; 1992; 1996; 2000; 2004; 2008; 2012; 2016; 2020; 2024

Honduras competed at the 2020 Summer Olympics in Tokyo. Originally scheduled to take place from 24 July to 9 August 2020, the Games were postponed to 23 July to 8 August 2021, because of the COVID-19 pandemic. It was the nation's twelfth appearance at the Summer Olympics.

== Competitors ==
The following is the list of the number and gender of the nation's competitors in various sports at the Games. Note that reserves in football are not counted:

Sport	Men	Women	Total
Athletics	1	0	1
Football	22	0	22
Judo	0	1	1
Swimming	1	1	2
Taekwondo	0	1	1
Total	24	3	27

== Athletics ==
Honduras received a universality slot from the World Athletics to send a male athlete to the Olympics.

Key

- Note–Ranks given for track events are within the athlete's heat only
- Q = Qualified for the next round
- q = Qualified for the next round as a fastest loser or, in field events, by position without achieving the qualifying target
- NR = National record
- N/A = Round not applicable for the event
- Bye = Athlete not required to compete in round

Track & road events

Athlete	Event	Final	
Athlete	Event	Result	Rank
Iván Zarco	Men's marathon	2:44:36	76

== Football ==
Summary

Key:

- A.E.T – After extra time.
- P – Match decided by penalty-shootout.

Team	Event	Group Stage				Quarterfinal	Semifinal	Final / BM	
Team	Event	Opposition Score	Opposition Score	Opposition Score	Rank	Opposition Score	Opposition Score	Opposition Score	Rank
Honduras men's	Men's tournament	Romania; L 0–1	New Zealand; W 3–2	South Korea; L 0–6	4	Did not advance			

=== Men's tournament ===
Honduras men's football team qualified for the Olympics by advancing to the final match of the 2020 CONCACAF Men's Olympic Qualifying Championship in Mexico.

Team roster

Honduras' final squad was announced on 2 July 2021.

Head coach: (Uruguay) Miguel Falero

No.	Pos.	Player	Date of birth (age)	Club
1	GK	Alex Güity	20 September 1997 (aged 23)	(National Autonomous Federation of Football of Honduras) Olimpia
2	DF	Denil Maldonado (captain)	26 May 1998 (aged 23)	(Football Federation of Chile) Everton
3	DF	Wesly Decas	11 August 1999 (aged 21)	(National Autonomous Federation of Football of Honduras) Motagua
4	DF	Carlos Meléndez	8 December 1997 (aged 23)	(National Autonomous Federation of Football of Honduras) Vida
5	DF	Cristopher Meléndez	25 November 1997 (aged 23)	(National Autonomous Federation of Football of Honduras) Motagua
6	MF	Jonathan Núñez	26 November 2001 (aged 19)	(National Autonomous Federation of Football of Honduras) Motagua
7	MF	José Alejandro Reyes	5 November 1997 (aged 23)	(National Autonomous Federation of Football of Honduras) Real España
8	FW	Edwin Rodríguez	25 September 1999 (aged 21)	(National Autonomous Federation of Football of Honduras) Olimpia
9	FW	Jorge Benguché*	21 May 1996 (aged 25)	(Portuguese Football Federation) Boavista
10	FW	Rigoberto Rivas	31 July 1998 (aged 22)	(Italian Football Federation) Reggina
11	FW	Samuel Elvir	25 April 2001 (aged 20)	(National Autonomous Federation of Football of Honduras) UPNFM
12	GK	Michael Perelló	11 July 1998 (aged 23)	(National Autonomous Federation of Football of Honduras) Real España
13	MF	Brayan Moya*	19 October 1992 (aged 28)	(Angolan Football Federation) 1º de Agosto
14	FW	José Pinto	27 September 1997 (aged 23)	(National Autonomous Federation of Football of Honduras) Olimpia
15	MF	Carlos Pineda	23 September 1997 (aged 23)	(National Autonomous Federation of Football of Honduras) Olimpia
16	DF	José García	21 September 1998 (aged 22)	(National Autonomous Federation of Football of Honduras) Olimpia
17	FW	Luis Palma	17 January 2000 (aged 21)	(National Autonomous Federation of Football of Honduras) Vida
18	FW	Juan Obregón	29 October 1997 (aged 23)	(United States Soccer Federation) Hartford Athletic
19	FW	Douglas Martínez	5 June 1997 (aged 24)	(United States Soccer Federation) Real Salt Lake
20	MF	Jorge Álvarez	28 January 1998 (aged 23)	(National Autonomous Federation of Football of Honduras) Olimpia
21	DF	Elvin Oliva	24 October 1997 (aged 23)	(National Autonomous Federation of Football of Honduras) Olimpia
22	GK	Bryan Ramos	8 August 2001 (aged 19)	(National Autonomous Federation of Football of Honduras) Real España

* Overage player.

Group play

Pos	Team	Pld	W	D	L	GF	GA	GD	Pts	Qualification
1	South Korea	3	2	0	1	10	1	+9	6	Advance to knockout stage
2	New Zealand	3	1	1	1	3	3	0	4	Advance to knockout stage
3	Romania	3	1	1	1	1	4	−3	4	
4	Honduras	3	1	0	2	3	9	−6	3	

Source: TOCOG and FIFA
Rules for classification: Group stage tiebreakers
22 July 2021
20:00

Honduras	0–1	Romania
	Report (TOCOG); Report (FIFA)	Oliva 45+1' (o.g.)

Kashima Stadium, Kashima
Referee: Leodán González (Uruguay)

25 July 2021
17:00

New Zealand	2–3	Honduras
Cacace 10'; Wood 49'	Report (TOCOG); Report (FIFA)	Palma 45+1'; Obregón 78'; Rivas 87'

Kashima Stadium, Kashima
Referee: Orel Grinfeld (Israel)

28 July 2021
17:30

South Korea	6–0	Honduras
Hwang Ui-jo 12' (pen.), 45+5', 52' (pen.); Won Du-jae 19' (pen.); Kim Jin-ya 64'; Lee Kang-in 82'	Report (TOCOG); Report (FIFA)

International Stadium Yokohama, Yokohama
Referee: Georgi Kabakov (Bulgaria)

== Judo ==
Honduras received an invitation from the Tripartite Commission and the International Judo Federation to send Cergia David Güity in the women's half-middleweight category (63 kg) to the Olympics.

Athlete	Event	Round of 32	Round of 16	Quarterfinals	Semifinals	Repechage	Final / BM	
Athlete	Event	Opposition Result	Opposition Result	Opposition Result	Opposition Result	Opposition Result	Opposition Result	Rank
Cergia David	Women's −63 kg	Quadros (BRA); L WO (Note: Cergia David did not pass the official weigh-in and did not take part in the competition.)	Did not advance					

== Swimming ==
Honduras received a universality invitation from FINA to send two top-ranked swimmers (one per gender) in their respective individual events to the Olympics, based on the FINA Points System of June 28, 2021.

Athlete	Event	Heat		Semifinal		Final	
Athlete	Event	Time	Rank	Time	Rank	Time	Rank
Julio Horrego	Men's 100 m breaststroke	1:02.45	43	Did not advance			
Julio Horrego	Men's 200 m breaststroke	2:17.51	37	Did not advance			
Julimar Avila	Women's 200 m butterfly	2:15.36	16 Q	2:16.38	16	Did not advance	

== Taekwondo ==
Honduras received an invitation from the Tripartite Commission and the World Taekwondo Federation to send Keila Avila in the women's heavyweight category (+67 kg) to the Olympics.

Athlete	Event	Round of 16	Quarterfinals	Semifinals	Repechage	Final / BM	
Athlete	Event	Opposition Result	Opposition Result	Opposition Result	Opposition Result	Opposition Result	Rank
Keyla Ávila	Women's +67 kg	Zheng Sy (CHN); L 1–20	Did not advance				

== See also ==
- Honduras at the 2019 Pan American Games
