= María Luisa Ronquillo =

Mexican long-distance runner

Personal information
- Nationality: Mexican
- Born: 13 December 1956 (age 69)

Sport
- Sport: Long-distance running
- Event: Marathon

María Luisa Ronquillo (born 13 December 1956) is a Mexican long-distance runner. She competed in the women's marathon at the 1984 Summer Olympics.
