= Honduras at the 2000 Summer Olympics =

- IOC code: HON
- NOC: Comité Olímpico Hondureño
- Website: cohonduras.com (in Spanish)

in Sydney
- Competitors: 20 (18 men and 2 women) in 3 sports
- Flag bearer: Alejandro Castellanos
- Medals: Gold 0 Silver 0 Bronze 0 Total 0

Summer Olympics appearances (overview)
- 1968; 1972; 1976; 1980; 1984; 1988; 1992; 1996; 2000; 2004; 2008; 2012; 2016; 2020; 2024

Honduras competed at the 2000 Summer Olympics in Sydney, Australia.

== Competitors ==
The following is the list of number of competitors in the Games.

Sport	Men	Women	Total
Athletics	0	1	1
Football	17	0	17
Swimming	1	1	2
Total	18	2	20

== Athletics ==
Athlete	Event	Heat		Quarterfinal		Semifinal		Final	
Athlete	Event	Time	Rank	Time	Rank	Time	Rank	Time	Rank
Gina Coello	Women's marathon	—						3:02:32	42

== Football ==
=== Men's tournament ===
Team Roster

- ( 1.) Carlos Escobar
- ( 2.) Iván Guerrero
- ( 3.) Elmer Montoya
- ( 4.) Junior Izaguirre
- ( 5.) Walter López
- ( 6.) Carlos Paez
- ( 7.) Francisco Pavón
- ( 8.) Jaime Rosales
- ( 9.) David Suazo
- (10.) Julio César de León
- (11.) Jairo Martinez
- (12.) Maynor René Suazo
- (13.) Elvis Scott
- (14.) Luis Ramírez
- (15.) Julio César Suazo
- (16.) Danilo Turcios
- (17.) Mario Chirinos
- (18.) Noel Valladares
- (19.) Carlos Salinas
- (20.) Hector Gutierrez
- (21.) José Rivera

Group stage

Team	Pld	W	D	L	GF	GA	GD	Pts
Italy	3	2	1	0	5	2	+3	7
Nigeria	3	1	2	0	7	6	+1	5
Honduras	3	1	1	1	6	7	−1	4
Australia	3	0	0	3	3	6	−3	0

13 September 2000
18:30

Nigeria	3–3	Honduras
Igbinadolor 50'; Agali 78'; Yakubu 90+1'	Report	Suazo 36', 76'; León 60'

Hindmarsh Stadium, Adelaide
Attendance: 13,386
Referee: Ľuboš Micheľ (Slovakia)

16 September 2000
18:30

Italy	3–1	Honduras
Comandini 12', 22'; Ambrosini 18'	Report	Comandini 29' (o.g.)

Hindmarsh Stadium, Adelaide
Attendance: 18,301
Referee: Lu Jun (China)

19 September 2000
20:00

Australia	1–2	Honduras
Rosales 51' (o.g.)	Report	Suazo 3', 60'

Sydney Football Stadium, Sydney
Attendance: 37,788
Referee: Mourad Daami (Tunisia)

== Swimming ==
Athlete	Event	Heat		Semifinal		Final	
Athlete	Event	Time	Rank	Time	Rank	Time	Rank
Alejandro Castellanos	Men's 100 m freestyle	54.06	64	Did not advance			
Pamela Vásquez	Women's 20 m freestyle	2:15.83	38	Did not advance			

== See also ==
- Honduras at the 1998 Central American and Caribbean Games
- Honduras at the 1999 Pan American Games
- Honduras at the 2002 Central American and Caribbean Games
