= Kevin Mejía =

Honduran amateur wrestler (born 1995)

Personal information
- Full name: Kevin Mejía Castillo
- Born: 5 May 1995 (age 31) Tela, Honduras

Sport
- Country: Honduras
- Sport: Wrestling
- Weight class: 97 kg
- Event: Greco-Roman
Medal record
Representing Honduras
Pan American Championships
Gold medal – first place	2021 Guatemala City	97 kg
Gold medal – first place	2022 Acapulco	97 kg
Gold medal – first place	2024 Acapulco	97 kg
Silver medal – second place	2018 Lima	97 kg
Silver medal – second place	2023 Buenos Aires	97 kg
Silver medal – second place	2025 Monterrey	97 kg
Silver medal – second place	2026 Coralville	97 kg
Bronze medal – third place	2016 Frisco	98 kg
Bronze medal – third place	2019 Buenos Aires	97 kg
U20 World Championships
Bronze medal – third place	2015 Salvador da Bahia	96 kg
Pan American Games
Silver medal – second place	2015 Toronto	98 kg
Bronze medal – third place	2019 Lima	97 kg
Bronze medal – third place	2023 Santiago	97 kg
Central American Games
Gold medal – first place	2013 San Jose	97 kg
Central American and Caribbean Games
Gold medal – first place	2026 Santo Domingo	97 kg
Silver medal – second place	2018 Barranquilla	97 kg
Bronze medal – third place	2014 Veracruz	97 kg
Bronze medal – third place	2023 San Salvador	97 kg

Kevin Mejía Castillo (Note: In this Spanish name, the first or paternal surname is Mejía and the second or maternal family name is Castillo.) (born 5 May 1995) is a Honduran wrestler. He qualified for the 2024 Summer Olympics and was named his country's co-flag bearer.

== Biography ==
Mejía was born in 1995. He is the second of five children. He spent his early years in Triunfo de la Cruz, Honduras. As a boy, he sold spinning tops. At age 13, he moved to Tegucigalpa from Triunfo de la Cruz, to train as a wrestler, following in the footsteps of one of his brothers. He joined the High Performance Centre run by the Honduran Olympic Committee (Comité Olímpico Hondureño, COH) and by 2011 won a bronze medal in the cadet category at the World Junior Wrestling Championships in Hungary. He won gold at the 2013 Central American Games and then won two bronze medals at the 2014 Central American and Caribbean Games.

Mejía served as the flag bearer for Honduras at the 2015 Pan American Games. There, he competed in the 98 kg Greco-Roman event and won the silver medal, becoming the first individual silver medalist for Honduras in the history of the Pan American Games, as well as the nation's only medalist at the 2015 games. Later that year, he competed at the World Junior Championships and won a bronze medal in the 96 kg category.

Mejía joined the German club SC-Oberlsbach in 2016. He won a silver medal at the 2018 Central American and Caribbean Games, won bronze at the 2019 Pan American Games, and bronze at the French Grand Prix in 2020. He won the gold medal at the 2021 Pan American Wrestling Championships, becoming the first-ever Honduran to do so. In 2023, he won bronze at the Pan American Games and was the only Honduran medalist. He qualified for the 2024 Summer Olympics by winning at the 2024 Pan American Wrestling Olympic Qualification Tournament, becoming the first Honduran to qualify. He was the only Honduran to directly qualify for the Olympics, as each of the others entered through a quota. He was the co-Honduran flag bearer at the opening Olympic ceremony. Mejía competed in the 97 kg event. He was eliminated in his first match by Rustam Assakalov of Uzbekistan.

Mejía has a son.

== Notes ==
Olympic Games
Preceded by Keyla Ávila; Julio Horrego	Flag bearer for Honduras; Paris 2024 with Julimar Ávila	Succeeded by Incumbent
