= Nelly Chávez =

Bolivian marathon runner

Personal information
- Nationality: Bolivian
- Born: 17 December 1945 (age 80)

Sport
- Sport: Long-distance running
- Event: Marathon

Nelly Chávez (born 17 December 1945) is a Bolivian long-distance runner. She competed in the women's marathon at the 1984 Summer Olympics. Chávez finished sixth in the marathon at the 1987 Pan American Games. She was the first woman to represent Bolivia at the Olympics.
