= Taekwondo at the 2008 Summer Olympics – Men's 80 kg =

Taekwondo competition

Men's 80 kg at the Games of the XXIX Olympiad
- Venue: Beijing Science and Technology University Gymnasium
- Date: 22 August 2008
- Competitors: 16 from 16 nations

Medalists
| 1st place, gold medalist(s) | | Hadi Saei | Iran |
| 2nd place, silver medalist(s) | | Mauro Sarmiento | Italy |
| 3rd place, bronze medalist(s) | | Zhu Guo | China |
| 3rd place, bronze medalist(s) | | Steven López | United States |

The men's 80 kg competition in taekwondo at the 2008 Summer Olympics in Beijing took place on August 22 at the Beijing Science and Technology University Gymnasium.

== Competition format ==
The main bracket consisted of a single-elimination tournament, culminating in the gold medal match. Two bronze medals were awarded at the taekwondo competitions. A repechage was used to determine the bronze medal winners. Every competitor who lost to one of the two finalists competed in the repechage, another single-elimination competition. Each semifinal loser faced the last remaining repechage competitor from the opposite half of the bracket in a bronze medal match.

== Schedule ==
All times are China standard time (UTC+8)

| Date | Time | Round |
|---|---|---|
| Friday, 22 August 2008 | 11:00; 16:00; 17:30; 20:30 | Preliminary round Quarterfinals; Semifinals; Final |

== Qualifying Athletes ==
| Athlete | Country |
|---|---|
| Lionel Baguissi | Gabon |
| Carlos Vásquez | Venezuela |
| Aaron Cook | Great Britain |
| Anju Jason | Marshall Islands |
| Bahri Tanrıkulu | Turkey |
| Steven López | United States |
| Mauro Sarmiento | Italy |
| Sebastien Konan | Ivory Coast |
| Abdulqader Hikmat Sarhan | Qatar |
| Rashad Ahmadov | Azerbaijan |
| Sébastien Michaud | Canada |
| Ángel Román | Puerto Rico |
| Miguel Ferrera | Honduras |
| Zhu Guo | China |
| Deepak Bista | Nepal |
| Hadi Saei | Iran |

== Results ==
Legend

- PTG — Won by points gap
- SUP — Won by superiority
- OT — Won on over time (Golden Point)

=== Main bracket ===
Preliminary round
1 | Lionel Baguissi (GAB) | 0
16 | Carlos Vásquez (VEN) | 5
8 | Aaron Cook (GBR) | 7
9 | Anju Jason (MHL) | 0
5 | Bahri Tanrıkulu (TUR) | 0
12 | Steven López (USA) | 3
4 | Mauro Sarmiento (ITA) | 4
13 | Sebastien Konan (CIV) | 1
6 | Abdulqader Hikmat Sarhan (QAT) | 0
11 | Rashad Ahmadov (AZE) | 5
3 | Sébastien Michaud (CAN) | 2
14 | Ángel Román (PUR) | 1
7 | Miguel Ferrera (HON) | 1
10 | Zhu Guo (CHN) | 3
2 | Deepak Bista (NEP) | 0
15 | Hadi Saei (IRI) | 7

Quarterfinals
Carlos Vásquez (VEN) | 2
Aaron Cook (GBR) | 5
Steven López (USA) | 1
Mauro Sarmiento (ITA) | 2
Rashad Ahmadov (AZE) | 0 (SUP)
Sébastien Michaud (CAN) | 0
Zhu Guo (CHN) | 2
Hadi Saei (IRI) | 3

Semifinals
Aaron Cook (GBR) | 5
Mauro Sarmiento (ITA) | 6
Rashad Ahmadov (AZE) | 1
Hadi Saei (IRI) | 4

Gold medal match
Mauro Sarmiento (ITA) | 4
Hadi Saei (IRI) | 6

=== Repechage ===
Round 1
Zhu Guo (CHN) | 6
Deepak Bista (NEP) | 2
Sebastien Konan (CIV) | 0
Steven López (USA) | 3

Bronze medal match
Zhu Guo (CHN) | 4
Aaron Cook (GBR) | 1
Rashad Ahmadov (AZE) | 2
Steven López (USA) | 3

== Controversy ==
An incident in the men's 80 kg competition may prove to have a more lasting impact on the sport. American Steven López, the two-time defending gold medalist in that class who had not lost a match since 2002, had one point taken away by the referee in the third period of his quarterfinal match against Italy's Mauro Sarmiento. The referee determined that Lopez had used an illegal "cut kick" (blocked an opponent's blow below the waist). The deduction turned Lopez' 2–1 lead to a 1–1 tie, and Lopez lost in sudden-death overtime. Team USA's team leader, Herb Perez, unsuccessfully protested the decision, asserting that Lopez had raised his left leg in defense and Sarmiento had kicked into the leg in an attempt to draw the deduction.

In the wake of the decision, Perez leveled serious charges against the sport's governing body, the World Taekwondo Federation:

- He claimed that the protest was not properly handled. Typically, decisions on protests must be made within 15 minutes. No response was made for 45 minutes.
- He also stated that the U.S. team received no indication why the protest was deemed "unacceptable". According to Perez, "Unacceptable could mean anything from we didn’t file the papers properly to we didn’t use the right color pencil... Under the WTF competition rules, we should have been notified about the decision, the criteria, the methodology used, what evidence was presented, and what referees were reviewing it. We were not."
- Perez also said that at a June 2008 conference, the heads of the 25 teams that were to compete in Beijing were asked to sign an agreement not to file any protests at the Games.
- After his protest was denied, Perez alleged that WTF officials approached him and asked him not to talk to the press.

Charles Robinson, a writer for Yahoo! Sports in the U.S., called the events surrounding Lopez' match "a chaotic episode that might ultimately prove to be the tipping point to Olympic doom", adding that it had been widely rumored that taekwondo was on the brink of being removed from the Olympic program.
