= Alejandro Castellanos =

Honduran swimmer (1979–2026)

Personal information
- Full name: Alejandro Castellanos
- National team: Honduras
- Born: 29 August 1979 Honduras
- Died: 10 August 2026 (aged 46) Tegucigalpa, Honduras

Sport
- Sport: Swimming

Alejandro Castellanos (29 August 1979 – 10 August 2026) was a Honduran swimmer. As a swimmer, he competed for Honduras in international competition. He was selected to compete in the men's 100 metre freestyle for Honduras at the 2000 Summer Olympics. There, he placed last in his heat and did not advance to the semifinals.

== Biography ==
Alejandro Castellanos was born on 29 August 1979 in Honduras, the son of Plutarco, who was a doctor, and Diana. As a swimmer, he competed for Honduras in international competition.

Castellanos was selected to compete in swimming for Honduras at the 2000 Summer Olympics held in Sydney, Australia. At the 2000 Summer Games, he was entered in one sole event, the men's 100 metre freestyle. Aside from his event, he was delegated as the flag bearer for the nation for the 2000 Summer Olympics Parade of Nations during the 2000 Summer Olympics opening ceremony. He earned a universality slot from the International Swimming Federation, which allows underrepresented National Olympic Committees qualify an athlete despite not meeting standard criteria. He had an entry time of 53.43 seconds in his entered event.

He competed in the qualifying heats of the men's 100 metre freestyle on 19 September 2000 in the third heat against seven other swimmers, namely: Aleksandr Agafonov, George Bovell, Howard Hinds, Paul Kutscher, Gentle Offoin, Ríkardur Ríkardsson, and Kenny Roberts. There, Castellanos recorded a time of 54.06 seconds and placed last, failing to advance further as only the top sixteen athletes amongst all of the heats would be able to qualify for the semifinals.

Castellanos was married to Ana Cecilia. He died on 10 August 2026, at the age of 46, after suffering a heart attack during exercise.

Olympic Games
Preceded by Darwin Angeles	Flag bearer for Honduras; Sydney 2000	Succeeded by Iizzwa Medina
