= Gabriela Andersen-Schiess =

Swiss long-distance runner

Personal information
- Born: 20 May 1945 (age 81) Zürich, Switzerland

Sport
- Country: Switzerland

Gabriela "Gaby" Andersen-Schiess (born 20 May 1945 in Zürich) is a former Swiss long-distance runner who participated in the first women's Olympic marathon at the 1984 Summer Olympics. Though living in Sun Valley, Idaho, and working as a ski instructor at the time, Andersen-Schiess is best remembered for representing Switzerland in the 1984 Los Angeles Games, and managing to finish the race despite being severely dehydrated and suffering from heat exhaustion in hot conditions.

== Major marathons ==
Andersen-Schiess won the inaugural California International Marathon in 1983. On October of the same year, she was invited to the 2nd annual Twin Cities Marathon. With a starting temperature that was warmer than average (a low of 16 °C [61 °F] and a high of 25 °C [77 °F]), many of the 7,500 runners struggled. But Andersen excelled, winning the race in 2:36:22, setting the course record.

== 1984 Olympics ==
Fourteen minutes into the 1984 Olympic marathon, Joan Benoit began to pull away from the rest of the pack. She went on to win in a time of 2 hours, 24 minutes, and 52 seconds. Twenty minutes after Benoit finished, then 39-year-old Andersen-Schiess entered the stadium.

With temperatures hitting nearly 30 °C (86 °F), the conditions were very warm for running the full marathon distance of 42.195 kilometres (26.2 miles). At the time, the rules stipulated that there could only be five water stations and the contestants could not be given water anywhere else. Gabriela Andersen-Schiess missed the fifth and last station and became dehydrated as a result. The crowd gasped as she staggered onto the track, her torso twisted, her left arm limp, her right leg mostly seized. She waved away medical personnel who rushed to help her, knowing that if they touched her she would be disqualified. While the effects of her heat exhaustion were evident, trackside medics saw that she was perspiring, which meant that her body still had some disposable fluids, and let her continue. The L.A. Coliseum crowd applauded as she limped around the track in the race’s final 400 metres, occasionally stopping and holding her head. It took five minutes and forty four seconds to complete the last 400 metres. She finished 37th out of 44, in a time of 2h 48m 42s.

Medical personnel tended to her immediately and she was released two hours later.

== Later career ==
The day after the marathon she told The New York Times that in two weeks she would compete at Park City, Utah in the 14th annual championship of Ride and Tie, the sport where two teammates alternately run and ride an equine teammate. She did, finishing the 38-mile mountainous trail in 4:33 for 20th place. She won the sport's two-woman title with Sally Edwards in 1987 at Big Creek, California.

She has also held Swiss national records in the 10,000 metres and the marathon.

== Achievements ==
Year	Competition	Venue	Position	Event	Notes
Representing Switzerland
1983	California International Marathon	Sacramento, California, United States	1st place, gold medalist(s)	Marathon	2:33:25
1983	Twin Cities Marathon	Minneapolis, United States	1st place, gold medalist(s)	Marathon	2:36:22
1984	Boston Marathon	Boston, United States	6th	Marathon	2:39:28
1984	Olympic Games	Los Angeles, United States	37th	Marathon	2:48:42

== Personal records (road) ==
- 10 km – 33:29 (1983)
- 15 km - 51:48 (1984)
- 20 km - 1:11:36 (1984)
- Half marathon - 1:15:29 (1984)
- Marathon - 2:33:25 (1983)
