= Lionel Baguissi =

Gabonese taekwondo practitioner (born 1974)

Medal record

Representing Gabon

Men's taekwondo

African Championships
Gold medal – first place	2001 Dakar	Welterweight

Lionel Baguissi (born June 5, 1974) is a Gabonese taekwondo practitioner.

He competed in the men's 80 kg taekwondo event at the 2008 Summer Olympics and was eliminated in the third round by losing to Carlos Vásquez of Venezuela 5–0.
