= Miguel Ferrera =

Honduran taekwondo practitioner

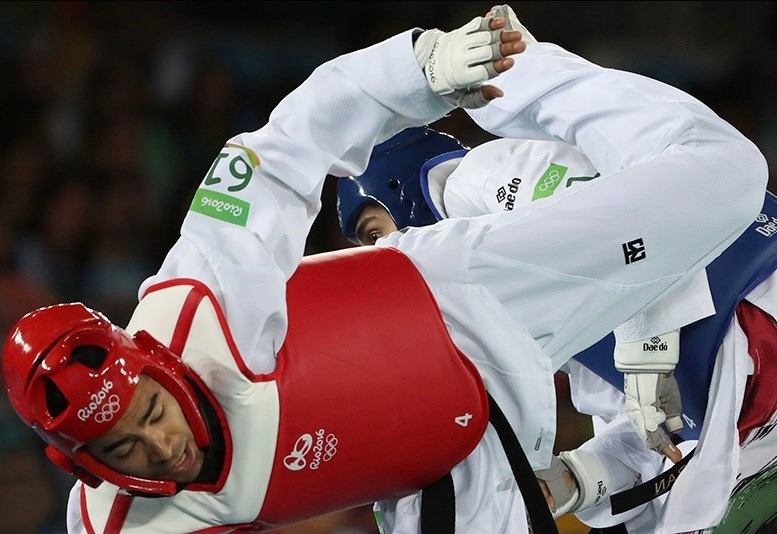
- Ferrera at the 2016 Olympics

Personal information
- Full name: Miguel Adrián Ferrera Rodríguez
- Nationality: Honduras
- Born: 25 May 1981 (age 45)
- Education: Universidad Nacional Autónoma de Honduras
- Height: 1.80 m (5 ft 11 in)
- Weight: 80 kg (176 lb)

Sport
- Sport: Taekwondo
- Club: Universidad Nacional Autónoma de Honduras
- Coached by: Adonay Medina; Julio Antonio Jova

Miguel Adrian Ferrera Rodríguez (born 25 May 1981) is a Honduran taekwondo practitioner. Ferrera qualified for the men's 80 kg class at the 2008 Summer Olympics in Beijing, after placing second from the Pan American Qualification Tournament in Cali, Colombia. He lost the preliminary round of sixteen match to China's Zhu Guo, with a final score of 1–3. Ferrera was also the nation's flag bearer at the opening ceremony.

In 2015, Ferrera became the first athlete from Honduras to be inducted into the World Hall of Fame of the International Taekwondo Federation (ITF). ITF also granted him a wild card entry spot at the 2016 Olympics.

Ferrera competed for Honduras at the 2016 Summer Olympics in Rio de Janeiro in the men's 80 kg class. He was defeated by Mehdi Khodabakhshi of Iran in the first round. He was the flag bearer for Honduras in the closing ceremony.

Olympic Games
Preceded by Iizzwa Medina	Flag bearer for Honduras; Beijing 2008	Succeeded by Ronald Bennett
