= Honduras at the 1996 Summer Olympics =

- IOC code: HON
- NOC: Comité Olímpico Hondureño
- Website: cohonduras.com (in Spanish)

in Atlanta
- Competitors: 7 (4 men and 3 women) in 4 sports
- Flag bearer: Darwin Angeles
- Medals: Gold 0 Silver 0 Bronze 0 Total 0

Summer Olympics appearances (overview)
- 1968; 1972; 1976; 1980; 1984; 1988; 1992; 1996; 2000; 2004; 2008; 2012; 2016; 2020; 2024

Honduras competed at the 1996 Summer Olympics in Atlanta, United States.

== Competitors ==
The following is the list of number of competitors in the Games.

Sport	Men	Women	Total
Athletics	0	1	1
Boxing	2	–	2
Judo	1	2	3
Swimming	1	0	1
Total	4	3	7

== Athletics ==
Key

- Note–Ranks given for track events are within the athlete's heat only
- Q = Qualified for the next round
- q = Qualified for the next round as a fastest loser or, in field events, by position without achieving the qualifying target

Women

Track & road events

Athlete	Event	Heat		Quarterfinal		Semifinal		Final	
Athlete	Event	Time	Rank	Time	Rank	Time	Rank	Time	Rank
Pastora Chávez	100 m	12.10	8	did not advance					

== Boxing ==
Athlete	Event	Round of 32	Round of 16	Quarterfinals	Semifinals	Final	
Athlete	Event	Opposition Result	Opposition Result	Opposition Result	Opposition Result	Opposition Result	Rank
Geovany Baca	Light flyweight	Rasoanaivo (MAD); L 0–12	Did not advance				
Darwin Angeles	Flyweight	Kovhanko (UKR); L 6–12	Did not advance				

== Judo ==
Men

Athlete	Event	Round of 64	Round of 32	Round of 16	Quarterfinals	Semifinals	Repechage			Final	
Athlete	Event	Round of 64	Round of 32	Round of 16	Quarterfinals	Semifinals	Round 1	Round 2	Round 3	Final	
Athlete	Event	Opposition Result	Opposition Result	Opposition Result	Opposition Result	Opposition Result	Opposition Result	Opposition Result	Opposition Result	Opposition Result	Rank
Leonardo Carcamo	–60 kg	Bye	Nomura (JPN); L	Did not advance			Ozhegin (RUS); L	Did not advance			

Women

Athlete	Event	Round of 32	Round of 16	Quarterfinals	Semifinals	Repechage			Final	
Athlete	Event	Round of 32	Round of 16	Quarterfinals	Semifinals	Round 1	Round 2	Round 3	Final	
Athlete	Event	Opposition Result	Opposition Result	Opposition Result	Opposition Result	Opposition Result	Opposition Result	Opposition Result	Opposition Result	Rank
Dora Maldonado	–48 kg	Bye	Tamura (JPN); L	Did not advance		Moskvina (BLR); L	Did not advance			
Jeny Rodríguez	–56 kg	Pekli (HUN); L	Did not advance							

== Swimming ==
Men

Athlete	Event	Heat		Final	
Athlete	Event	Time	Rank	Time	Rank
Ramón Valle	1500 m freestyle	16:14.76	29	did not advance	

== See also ==
- Honduras at the 1995 Pan American Games
- Honduras at the 1998 Central American and Caribbean Games
