= Leda Díaz =

Honduran long-distance runner

Personal information
- Nationality: Honduran
- Born: 28 October 1946 (age 79)

Sport
- Sport: Long-distance running
- Event: Marathon

Leda Díaz (born 28 October 1946) is a Honduran long-distance runner. She competed in the women's marathon at the 1984 Summer Olympics.

The 1984 Olympics were Díaz's first marathon and the first ever Olympic marathon for women. The race started at the Santa Monica City College track. After 2 1/2 laps, Díaz was already a lap behind the majority of the field. She was running at about 9 minutes per mile (340 s/km) pace following the track portion of the race, far behind the 5.5 minutes per mile (210 s/km) pace of the leaders.

Her pace was so slow that IAAF officials assumed she was injured, and she was checked by physicians who found nothing physically wrong. After about three miles, IAAF officials convinced her to drop out of the race over concerns that her finish would interrupt the women's 100 metres hurdles heats. The officials said that she probably would have finished, but would not have sped up. Her predicted finishing time was about 1.5 hours after the rest of the field.

Díaz's run was also noted to have an effect on spectators and the Santa Monica police, who waited after being told that one more runner was on the course and applauded her as she passed.

Other sources claimed Díaz continued on a five-hour marathon pace for about 12.5 miles (20.1 km) before she dropped out. She was one of six runners to not finish the 1984 Olympic marathon, with other runners citing hot weather.

Díaz's performance was later used as an example of how Olympic officials did not tolerate athletes who could not win, undermining the 'joy of participation'.
