= Keyla Ávila =

Honduran taekwondo practitioner (born 1990)

Personal information
- Born: 16 June 1990 (age 36) Tegucigalpa, Honduras

Sport
- Sport: Taekwondo
Medal record
Representing Honduras
Pan American Championships
Bronze medal – third place	2010 Monterry	+67 kg
Bronze medal – third place	2014 Aguascalientes	+73 kg
Bronze medal – third place	2016 Queretaro	+73 kg

Keyla Paola Ávila Perez (born 16 June 1990) is a Honduran taekwondo practitioner.

== Personal life ==
She studied physiotherapy at the National Autonomous University of Honduras, in Tegucigalpa. She has a daughter, born in 2013.

== Career ==
She has won three bronze medals at the Pan American Taekwondo Championships. She was selected for the taekwondo event at the 2020 Summer Olympics – women's +67 kg.

Olympic Games
Preceded by Rolando Palacios	Flag bearer for Honduras; Tokyo 2020 with Julio Horrego	Succeeded by Julimar Ávila; Kevin Mejía
