= Zhu Guo =

Chinese Taekwondo practitioner

Medal record

Representing China

Men's taekwondo

Olympic Games
Bronze medal – third place	2008 Beijing	80 kg

Asian Championships
Silver medal – second place	2008 Luoyang	Welterweight

Zhu Guo (simplified Chinese: 朱国; traditional Chinese: 朱國; pinyin: Zhū Guó; born June 14, 1985, in Fuxin, Liaoning) is a male Chinese Taekwondo practitioner.

At the 2008 Summer Olympics Zhu won the bronze medal in the men's 80 kg category. He lost to eventual gold medalist Hadi Saei of Iran in the quarterfinals but captured bronze by defeating Aaron Cook of Great Britain and Deepak Bista of Nepal in the repechage.
