= Rodolfo Torres (swimmer) =

Honduran swimmer (born 1953)

Personal information
- Full name: Rodolfo Torres
- Born: 14 July 1953 (age 72)

Sport
- Sport: Swimming

Rodolfo Torres Lazo (born 14 July 1953) is a Honduran swimmer, musician, and singer. Born in San Pedro Sula, he started swimming at the age of nine and represented Delfines Sampedranos. He earned a scholarship to study in the United States and worked as a swimming instructor. He later competed for Honduras at the 1984 Summer Olympics in three events though did not medal in any of the events.

After his swimming career, he became a musician and singer and collaborated frequently with Timbiriche and Paloma San Basilio. He represented Honduras in the OTI Festival 1987. He later worked as a business administrator and competed in masters swimming for Honduras internationally.

== Biography ==
Rodolfo Torres Lazo was born on 14 July 1953 in San Pedro Sula, Honduras. Torres started swimming at the age of nine at the request of his parents, initially fearing it due to the chance of drowning. He represented the swim club Delfines Sampedranos. Due to his swimming ability, he earned a scholarship to go to the United States and studied Business Administration at La Salle University. He graduated in 1972. During his time in the United States, he was a swimming instructor in a summer camp. He was also an instructor at the University of Vermont.

Torres also competed in swimming for Honduras internationally. He competed at the 1984 Summer Olympics held in Los Angeles in three events: the men's 100 metre freestyle, men's 4 × 100 metre medley relay, and men's 4 × 100 metre freestyle relay. He did not medal in any of the events.

After the Summer Games, he became a musician and singer. He represented Honduras in the OTI Festival 1987 with the song "Uno más", which he wrote together with Fernando Chacón. During his music career, he collaborated frequently with pop group Timbiriche and singer Paloma San Basilio. Torres later became a business administrator and masters swimmer, competing in international and regional tournaments for Honduras.
