= Cristopher Pavón =

Honduran weightlifter (born 1993)

Personal information
- Born: April 18, 1993 (age 33)
- Height: 1.73 m (5 ft 8 in)
- Weight: 93 kg (205 lb)

Sport
- Country: Honduras
- Sport: Weightlifting
- Event: 94 kg

Cristopher Joel Pavón Funes (born 18 April 1993 in El Progreso) is a Honduran weightlifter. He represented his country in the 2012 Summer Olympics, and the 2016 Summer Olympics. In 2019 he tested positive for stanozolol metabolites and dehydrochloromethyl-testosterone metabolites and was banned until 2023 by the International Weightlifting Federation.
