= Santiago Fonseca =

Honduran racewalker (born 1953)

Personal information
- Nationality: Honduran
- Born: 30 December 1953 (age 72)
- Height: 1.66 m (5 ft 5 in)
- Weight: 60 kg (132 lb)

Sport
- Sport: Athletics
- Event: Racewalking

Santiago Fonseca (born 30 December 1953) is a Honduran racewalker. He competed in the men's 20 kilometres walk at the 1976, 1984 and the 1988 Summer Olympics. Fonseca was the flag bearer for Honduras in the Seoul 1988 opening ceremony.
