= Sara Pastrana =

Honduran swimmer (born 1999)

Personal information
- Born: 12 March 1999 (age 27)

Sport
- Sport: Swimming

Sara Elizabeth Pastrana (born 12 March 1999) is a Honduran swimmer. She competed in the women's 200 metre freestyle event at the 2016 Summer Olympics.

In 2019, she represented Honduras at the 2019 World Aquatics Championships held in Gwangju, South Korea. She competed in the women's 200 metre freestyle and 400 metre freestyle events. In the 200-metre event, she did not advance to compete in the semi-finals and in the 400 metre event she did not advance to compete in the final.
