= Julio Horrego =

Honduran swimmer (born 1998)

Personal information
- Born: 8 October 1998 (age 27) San Pedro Sula, Honduras
- Spouse: Single

Sport
- Sport: Swimming
- Strokes: Breaststroke, individual medley
- Club: South Florida Aquatic Club
- College team: Florida State University
- Coach: Christopher Anderson
Medal record
Men's swimming
Representing Honduras
Central American and Caribbean Games
Bronze medal – third place	2023 San Salvador	50 m breaststroke
Bronze medal – third place	2023 San Salvador	100 m breaststroke
Bronze medal – third place	2023 San Salvador	200 m breaststroke

Julio Horrego (born 8 October 1998) is a Honduran swimmer. He represented Honduras at the 2019 World Aquatics Championships in Gwangju, South Korea. He competed in the men's 100 metre breaststroke and 200 metre individual medley events.

In 2019, he represented Honduras at the Pan American Games held in Lima, Peru.

He represented Honduras at the 2020 Summer Olympics in Tokyo, Japan. He was the flagbearer during the 2020 Summer Olympics Parade of Nations as part of the opening ceremony on 23 July 2021.

He also represented Honduras at the 2021 Short Course World Aquatic Championship in Abu Dhabi, United Emirates, where he placed 25th in the world.

Olympic Games
Preceded by Rolando Palacios	Flag bearer for Honduras; Tokyo 2020 with Keyla Ávila	Succeeded by Julimar Ávila; Kevin Mejía
