= Karen Vilorio =

Honduran swimmer (born 1993)

Personal information
- Full name: Karen Alejandra Vilorio Muchnik
- Born: May 27, 1993 (age 33)

Sport
- Sport: Swimming
- Strokes: Backstroke

Karen Alejandra Vilorio Muchnik (born 27 May 1993) is a Honduran retired swimmer. She competed at the 2012 Summer Olympics. She was born in Tegucigalpa.
