= Allan Gutiérrez Castro =

Honduran swimmer (born 1993)

Personal information
- Born: August 12, 1993 (age 32) San Pedro Sula, Honduras

Sport
- Sport: Swimming

Allan Gutiérrez Castro (born 12 August 1993) is a Honduran swimmer. At the 2012 Summer Olympics in London, he competed in the Men's 400 metre freestyle, finishing in 28th place in the heats.
