= Julimar Ávila =

Honduran-American swimmer (born 1997)

Personal information
- Full name: Julimar Cecilia Ávila Mancia
- Nationality: American, Honduran
- Born: 21 January 1997 (age 29) Boston, Massachusetts, U.S.

Sport
- Country: Honduras
- Sport: Swimming
- College team: Boston University Imperial College London

Julimar Cecilia Ávila Mancia (born 21 January 1997) is a swimmer. Born in the United States, she represents Honduras internationally. She competed in the 200 metre butterfly at the 2020 Summer Olympics. She is the first Honduran swimmer to advance into an Olympic semifinal. She also competed at the 2024 Summer Olympics.

== Swimming career ==
Ávila began swimming when she was seven months old and began representing Honduras at the international level at age ten. When she was 14, she finished 16th in the 100 metre freestyle at the 2011 Pan American Games. At the 2013 World Aquatics Championships, she finished 23rd in the 200 metre butterfly heats. She represented Honduras at the 2014 Summer Youth Olympics and finished 31st in the 100 metre freestyle and 25th in the 200 metre butterfly.

Ávila competed at the 2017 World Aquatics Championships and finished 41st in the 100 metre freestyle and 37th in the 100 metre butterfly. At the 2019 Pan American Games, she finished 12th in the 100 metre freestyle with a national record time of 57.74. She also finished 12th in the 200 metre individual medley with a national record time of 2:22.43. At the 2019 World Aquatics Championships, she finished 41st in the 100 metre butterfly and 31st in the 200 metre individual medley.

Ávila qualified to represent Honduras at the 2020 Summer Olympics in the 200 metre butterfly through a Universality place. In the heats, she set a new national record time of 2:15.36 and advanced into the semifinals. She became the first Honduran swimmer and the first swimmer who qualified through a Universality place to advance into an Olympic semifinal. She finished 16th in the semifinals with a time of 2:16.38 and did not advance into the finals.

At the 2022 World Aquatics Championships, Ávila finished 22nd in both the 100 and 200 metre butterfly. She advanced into the 200 metre freestyle final at the 2023 Pan American Games and finished 14th. She qualified to represent Honduras at the 2024 Summer Olympics in the 200 metre freestyle through a Universality place. She swam a time of 2:04.88 to finish 22nd in the heats. She was her country's flagbearer in both the opening and closing ceremonies.

== Personal life ==
Ávila was born in Boston to Honduran parents. She graduated from Boston University with a degree in biology in 2019.

Olympic Games
Preceded by Keyla Ávila; Julio Horrego	Flag bearer for Honduras; Paris 2024 with Kevin Mejía	Succeeded by Incumbent
