= Honduran Olympic Committee =

National Olympic Committee of Honduras

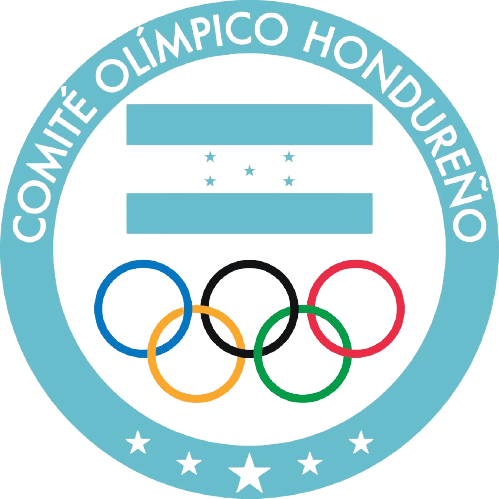
- Country: Honduras
- [[|]]
- Code: HON
- Created: 1956
- Recognized: 1956
- Continental Association: PASO
- Headquarters: Tegucigalpa, Honduras
- President: José Ubaldo Zavala Valladares
- Secretary General: Oscar René Berganza Deras
- Website: somoscoh.org

The Honduran Olympic Committee (Spanish: Comité Olímpico Hondureño) is the Committee that represents the Honduras athletes in the International Olympic Committee (IOC), created in 1956 and recognized by the International Olympic Committee that same year.

== See also ==
- Honduras at the Olympics
