= Athletics at the 1968 Summer Olympics – Men's 5000 metres =

Men's 5000 metres at the Games of the XIX Olympiad
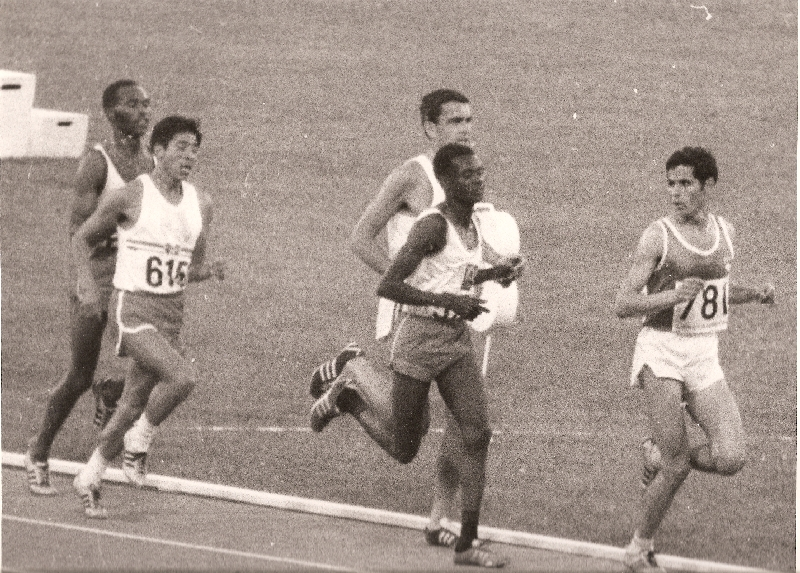
- Mohammed Gammoudi crossing the finish line
- Venue: Estadio Olímpico Universitario
- Date: October 15–17, 1968
- Competitors: 39 from 25 nations
- Winning time: 14:05.0

Medalists
1st place, gold medalist(s)		Mohammed Gammoudi; Tunisia
2nd place, silver medalist(s)		Kipchoge Keino; Kenya
3rd place, bronze medalist(s)		Naftali Temu; Kenya

The Men's 5000 metres competition at the 1968 Summer Olympics in Mexico City, Mexico. The event was held at the University Olympic Stadium on October 15–17.

== Competition format ==
The Men's 5000m competition consisted of three heats (Round 1) and a Final. The top five runners from each heat advanced to the final.

== Records ==
Prior to this competition, the existing world and Olympic records were as follows:

World record	Ron Clarke (AUS)	13:16.6	Stockholm, Sweden	July 5, 1966
Olympic record	Vladimir Kuts (URS)	13:39.6	Melbourne, Australia	November 26, 1956

== Results ==
=== Round 1 ===
==== Heat 1 ====
Rank	Athlete	Nation	Time (hand)	Time (automatic)	Notes
1	Kipchoge Keino	Kenya	14:28.4	14:28.40	Q
2	Mohammed Gammoudi	Tunisia	14:29.0	14:29.06	Q
3	Mamo Wolde	Ethiopia	14:29.8	14:29.85	Q
4	Bob Finlay	Canada	14:31.8	14:31.81	Q
5	Emiel Puttemans	Belgium	14:34.6	14:34.58	Q
6	Bernd Dießner	East Germany	14:41.0	14:41.03	
7	Rashid Sharafetdinov	Soviet Union	14:44.0	14:44.41	
8	Dick Taylor	Great Britain	14:46.6	14:46.52	
9	Keisuke Sawaki	Japan	15:00.8	15:00.86	
10	György Kiss	Hungary	15:13.0	15:13.07	
11	Lou Scott	United States	15:13.6	15:13.69	
12	Esau Adenji	Cameroon	15:46.2	15:46.21	
13	Gabriel M'Boa	Central African Republic	17:33.0	17:32.95	
14	Juan Valladares	Honduras	18:21.6	18:21.52	
	Efraín Cordero	El Salvador	DNS	–	
	Arne Risa	Norway	DNS	–	

==== Heat 2 ====
Rank	Athlete	Nation	Time (hand)	Time (automatic)	Notes
1	Naftali Temu	Kenya	14:20.4	14:20.38	Q
2	Ron Clarke	Australia	14:20.8	14:20.78	Q
3	Wohib Masresha	Ethiopia	14:27.0	14:26.99	Q
4	Jack Bacheler	United States	14:31.0	14:31.00	Q
5	Nikolay Sviridov	Soviet Union	14:38.8	14:38.70	Q
6	Ahmed Zammel	Tunisia	14:54.0	14:54.02	
7	Alan Blinston	Great Britain	15:06.2	15:06.28	
8	Werner Schneiter	Switzerland	15:08.2	15:08.24	
9	Mustafa Musa	Uganda	15:10.2	15:10.24	
10	Edward Stawiarz	Poland	15:13.8	15:13.87	
11	Werner Girke	West Germany	15:20.8	15:20.85	
12	Rafael Pérez	Costa Rica	15:41.4	15:41.37	
13	Benjamin Silva-Netto	Philippines	17:10.2	17:10.15	
14	Clovis Morales	Honduras	18:40.2	18:40.13	
	Álvaro Mejía	Colombia	DNS	–	
	Manuel de Oliveira	Portugal	DNS	–	

==== Heat 3 ====
Rank	Athlete	Nation	Time (hand)	Time (automatic)	Notes
1	Jean Wadoux	France	14:19.8	14:19.80	Q
2	Juan Máximo Martínez	Mexico	14:20.0	14:20.06	Q
3	Harald Norpoth	West Germany	14:20.6	14:20.59	Q
4	Rex Maddaford	New Zealand	14:20.8	14:20.82	Q
5	Fikru Deguefu	Ethiopia	14:21.6	14:21.66	Q
6	Bob Day	United States	14:23.2	14:23.23	
7	Leonid Mykytenko	Soviet Union	14:44.0	14:44.35	
8	Allan Rushmer	Great Britain	15:05.2	15:05.17	
9	Julio Quevedo	Guatemala	15:23.0	15:23.03	
	Dave Ellis	Canada	DNF	–	
	Roland Brehmer	Poland	DNF	–	
	Larbi Oukada	Morocco	DNS	–	
	Mikhail Zhelev	Bulgaria	DNS	–	
	Robert Hackman	Ghana	DNS	–	
	Lajos Mecser	Hungary	DNS	–	

=== Final ===
Rank	Athlete	Nation	Time (hand)	Time (automatic)	Notes
1st place, gold medalist(s)	Mohammed Gammoudi	Tunisia	14:05.0	14:05.01	
2nd place, silver medalist(s)	Kipchoge Keino	Kenya	14:05.2	14:05.16	
3rd place, bronze medalist(s)	Naftali Temu	Kenya	14:06.4	14:06.41	
4	Juan Máximo Martínez	Mexico	14:10.8	14:10.76	
5	Ron Clarke	Australia	14:12.4	14:12.45	
6	Wohib Masresha	Ethiopia	14:17.6	14:17.70	
7	Nikolay Sviridov	Soviet Union	14:18.4	14:18.40	
8	Fikru Deguefu	Ethiopia	14:19.0	14:18.98	
9	Jean Wadoux	France	14:20.8	14:20.73	
10	Rex Maddaford	New Zealand	14:39.8	14:39.72	
11	Bob Finlay	Canada	14:45.0	14:44.92	
12	Emiel Puttemans	Belgium	14:59.6	14:59.56	
—N/a	Harald Norpoth	West Germany	DNF		
—N/a	Mamo Wolde	Ethiopia	DNS		
—N/a	Jack Bacheler	United States	DNS		

Notes: Q- Qualified by place
DNF - Did Not Finish
