= Athletics at the 1968 Summer Olympics – Men's 10,000 metres =

Men's 10,000 metres at the Games of the XIX Olympiad
- Venue: Estadio Olímpico Universitario
- Dates: October 13, 1968
- Competitors: 37 from 23 nations
- Winning time: 29:27.4

Medalists
1st place, gold medalist(s)		Naftali Temu; Kenya
2nd place, silver medalist(s)		Mamo Wolde; Ethiopia
3rd place, bronze medalist(s)		Mohamed Gammoudi; Tunisia

Official Video Highlights

The official results of the Men's 10,000 metres Race at the 1968 Summer Olympics in Mexico City, Mexico held on Sunday October 13, 1968. There were a total number of 37 competitors from 23 nations. The winning margin was 0.6 seconds.

While Abebe Bikila had won the Marathon in the two previous Olympics to show Ethiopia's ability, this was Kenya's first ever gold medal, with Naftali Temu outsprinting leader Mamo Wolde on the home straight.

== Final ranking ==
RANK	ATHLETE	TIME
	Naftali Temu (KEN)	29:27.4
	Mamo Wolde (ETH)	29:28.0
	Mohamed Gammoudi (TUN)	29:34.2
4.	Juan Martínez (MEX)	29:35.0
5.	Nikolay Sviridov (URS)	29:43.2
6.	Ron Clarke (AUS)	29:44.2
7.	Ron Hill (GBR)	29:53.2
8.	Wohib Masresha (ETH)	29:57.0
9.	Nedo Farčić (YUG)	30:01.2
10.	Álvaro Mejía (COL)	30:10.6
11.	Tracy Smith (USA)	30:14.6
12.	Rex Maddaford (NZL)	30:17.2
13.	Michael Tagg (GBR)	30:18.0
14.	Fikru Deguefu (ETH)	30:19.4
15.	Jürgen Haase (GDR)	30:24.2
16.	Tom Laris (USA)	30:26.2
17.	Leonid Mikitenko (URS)	30:46.0
18.	Manfred Letzerich (FRG)	30:48.6
19.	Tsugumichi Suzuki (JPN)	30:52.0
20.	János Szerényi (HUN)	30:53.6
21.	Musa Mustapha (UGA)	30:54.2
22.	Lajos Mecser (HUN)	30:54.8
23.	Lutz Philipp (FRG)	30:57.0
24.	Vyacheslav Alanov (URS)	31:01.0
25.	Dave Ellis (CAN)	31:06.6
26.	Jim Hogan (GBR)	31:18.6
27.	Keisuke Sawaki (JPN)	31:25.2
28.	Van Nelson (USA)	31:40.2
29.	György Kiss (HUN)	32:03.4
30.	Juan Pérez (CRC)	32:14.6
31.	Benjamín Silva-Netto (PHI)	32:35.2
	Kip Keino (KEN)	DNF
	Rodolfo Erazo (HON)	DNF
	Evan Maguire (NZL)	DNF
	Alifu Massaquoi (SLE)	DNF
	Willy Polleunis (BEL)	DNF
	Edward Stawiarz (POL)	DNF
	Kirpal Singh (IND)	DNS
