= Athletics at the 1968 Summer Olympics – Men's 800 metres =

Men's 800 metres at the Games of the XIX Olympiad
- Venue: Estadio Olímpico Universitario
- Date: October 13–15, 1968
- Competitors: 44 from 32 nations
- Winning time: 1:44.3 =WR OR

Medalists
| 1st place, gold medalist(s) | | Ralph Doubell; Australia |
| 2nd place, silver medalist(s) | | Wilson Kiprugut; Kenya |
| 3rd place, bronze medalist(s) | | Tom Farrell; United States |

The men's 800 metres competition at the 1968 Summer Olympics in Mexico City, Mexico. The event were held at the University Olympic Stadium on October 13–15. Forty-four athletes from 32 nations competed. The maximum number of athletes per nation had been set at 3 since the 1930 Olympic Congress. The event was won by 0.2 seconds by Ralph Doubell of Australia, the nation's second title in the men's 800 metres—and its first medal in the event since its first title in 1896. Wilson Kiprugut of Kenya improved on his 1964 bronze to take silver, becoming the seventh man to win a second medal in the 800 metres. Tom Farrell's bronze put the United States back on the podium for the first time since 1956.

== Background ==
This was the 16th appearance of the event, which is one of 12 athletics events to have been held at every Summer Olympics. Three finalists from 1964 returned: bronze medalist Wilson Kiprugut of Kenya, fourth-place finisher Tom Farrell of the United States, and eighth-place finisher Jacques Pennewaert of Belgium. American Wade Bell, the 1967 Pan American champion, was a favorite to challenge Kiprugut.

The Dominican Republic, El Salvador, Nicaragua, Senegal, and Sudan appeared in the event for the first time; East Germany and West Germany competed separately for the first time as well. Great Britain and the United States each made their 15th appearance, tied for the most among all nations.

== Summary ==
Kiprugut took the race out fast from the gun. Running from lane 6, he it the break line with a 1 metre lead on Ben Cayenne, but the rest of the field was 3 more metres back. Dieter Fromm pushed the first backstretch to get back in contact with the two frontrunners, with teenager Jozef Plachý in tow. Ralph Doubell found himself in dead last place from the fast start, but weaved his way through to fifth place on the backstretch, then ran the outside of the lane to get to Plachý's shoulder. The field tightened up during the first homestretch, Kiprugut still in the lead at the bell in 50.98. Through the penultimate turn, Kiprugut separated off the front again, Cayenne fell back through the field. Again on the backstretch, worked hard to regain contact with Kiprugut, bringing Doubell with him still on the outside of the lane. As Plachý and the rest of the field slowed, Farrell came from next to last at the bell to fourth place. Entering the final turn, Doubell got past Fromm and onto the rail still 4 metres behind Kiprugut. With a 5 metre gap back to Fromm, it was a two man race to the finish, Doubell sprinting to chase the tiring Kiprugut. 50 metres from the finish, Doubell eased by Kiprugut on the outside. Ten metres behind them, Farrell went past Fromm with Walter Adams chasing. Kiprugut chased Doubell all the way to the line, Doubell taking a 1 metre victory. Adams couldn't catch Farrell and gave up the chase, gliding across the finish.

Doubell's time equalled Peter Snell's world record (hand timed), while both Doubell and Kiprugut had beaten Snell's Olympic record. Farrell was the first American medalist since the four in a row winning streak 1936-1956. Save Dave Wottle's victory the following Olympics, USA has only won four more bronze medals after Farrell.

== Competition format ==
The competition used the three-round format that had been in use for most Games since 1912. The event had seven heats in the first round, two semifinals and a final. The top two in each of the first round heats progressed, as did the four fastest non-qualifiers. The top four finishers in each semifinal race reached the finals.

== Records ==
Prior to the competition, the existing World and Olympic records were as follows.

| World record | Peter Snell (NZL) | 1:44.3 | Christchurch, New Zealand | 2 February 1962 |
| Olympic record | Peter Snell (NZL) | 1:45.1 | Tokyo, Japan | 16 October 1964 |

Ralph Doubell and Wilson Kiprugut both ran under the Olympic record in the final, with Doubell finishing in 1:44.3 to equal the world record.

== Schedule ==
All times are Central Standard Time (UTC-6)

| Date | Time | Round |
|---|---|---|
| Sunday, 13 October 1968 | 15:50 | Round 1 |
| Monday, 14 October 1968 | 16:20 | Semifinals |
| Tuesday, 15 October 1968 | 18:10 | Final |

== Results ==
=== Round 1 ===
Qual. rule: first 2 of each heat (Q) plus the 4 fastest Time (hand) !! Time (automatic)s (q) qualified.

==== Heat 1 ====
| Rank | Athlete | Nation | Time (hand) | Time (automatic) | Notes |
|---|---|---|---|---|---|
| 1 | Thomas Saisi | Kenya | 1:47.0 | 1:46.99 | Q |
| 2 | Jean-Pierre Dufresne | France | 1:47.6 | 1:47.61 | Q |
| 3 | Matias Habtemichael | Ethiopia | 1:49.6 | 1:49.63 | |
| 4 | Papa M'Baye N'Diaye | Senegal | 1:51.3 | 1:51.31 | |
| 5 | Wade Bell | United States | 1:51.5 | 1:51.52 | |
| 6 | Róbert Honti | Hungary | 1:53.8 | 1:53.88 | |
| — | Rudi Simon | Belgium | DNF | – | |

==== Heat 2 ====
| Rank | Athlete | Nation | Time (hand) | Time (automatic) | Notes |
|---|---|---|---|---|---|
| 1 | Dieter Fromm | East Germany | 1:46.9 | 1:46.98 | Q |
| 2 | Franz-Josef Kemper | West Germany | 1:47.0 | 1:47.02 | Q |
| 3 | Ron Kutschinski | United States | 1:47.6 | 1:47.61 | q |
| 4 | Ramasamy Subramaniam | Malaysia | 1:50.8 | 1:50.87 | |
| 5 | Gilbert Van Manshoven | Belgium | 1:52.3 | 1:52.32 | |
| — | Guillermo Cuello | Argentina | DNF | – | |

==== Heat 3 ====
| Rank | Athlete | Nation | Time (hand) | Time (automatic) | Notes |
|---|---|---|---|---|---|
| 1 | Walter Adams | West Germany | 1:48.4 | 1:48.50 | Q |
| 2 | Jozef Plachý | Czechoslovakia | 1:48.6 | 1:48.65 | Q |
| 3 | Noel Carroll | Ireland | 1:49.0 | 1:49.01 | |
| 4 | Ahmed Issa | Chad | 1:49.0 | 1:49.09 | |
| 5 | Roberto Silva | Mexico | 1:50.4 | 1:50.49 | |
| 6 | Gerd Larsen | Denmark | 1:51.9 | 1:51.98 | |
| — | Neville Myton | Jamaica | DNF | – | |

==== Heat 4 ====
| Rank | Athlete | Nation | Time (hand) | Time (automatic) | Notes |
|---|---|---|---|---|---|
| 1 | Ralph Doubell | Australia | 1:47.2 | 1:47.24 | Q |
| 2 | Henryk Szordykowski | Poland | 1:47.4 | 1:47.48 | Q |
| 3 | Robert Ouko | Kenya | 1:47.6 | 1:47.65 | q |
| 4 | John Ametepey | Ghana | 1:50.7 | 1:50.78 | |
| 5 | Gilles Sibon | France | 1:50.8 | 1:50.87 | |
| 6 | Chris Carter | Great Britain | 1:52.9 | 1:52.99 | |
| 7 | José L'Oficial | Dominican Republic | 1:55.6 | 1:55.66 | |
| 8 | Alfredo Cubías | El Salvador | 2:08.7 | 2:08.72 | |

==== Heat 5 ====
| Rank | Athlete | Nation | Time (hand) | Time (automatic) | Notes |
|---|---|---|---|---|---|
| 1 | Wilson Kiprugut | Kenya | 1:46.1 | 1:46.17 | Q |
| 2 | Tom Farrell | United States | 1:47.9 | 1:47.96 | Q |
| 3 | Tomáš Jungwirth | Czechoslovakia | 1:48.7 | 1:48.72 | |
| 4 | Anders Gärderud | Sweden | 1:48.9 | 1:48.99 | |
| 5 | Jun Nagai | Japan | 1:51.2 | 1:51.27 | |
| 6 | Angelo Hussein | Sudan | 1:53.4 | 1:53.43 | |
| 7 | Jacques Pennewaert | Belgium | 1:53.8 | 1:53.81 | |
| 8 | Francisco Menocal | Nicaragua | 1:58.9 | 1:58.96 | |

==== Heat 6 ====
| Rank | Athlete | Nation | Time (hand) | Time (automatic) | Notes |
|---|---|---|---|---|---|
| 1 | Dave Cropper | Great Britain | 1:47.9 | 1:47.96 | Q |
| 2 | Ben Cayenne | Trinidad and Tobago | 1:48.2 | 1:48.22 | Q |
| 3 | Yevhen Arzhanov | Soviet Union | 1:48.4 | 1:48.46 | q |
| 4 | Byron Dyce | Jamaica | 1:48.5 | 1:48.58 | q |
| 5 | Mamo Sebsibe | Ethiopia | 1:49.7 | 1:49.75 | |
| 6 | Gianni Del Buono | Italy | 1:50.2 | 1:50.23 | |
| 7 | Xaver Frick Jr. | Liechtenstein | 1:52.6 | 1:52.68 | |
| 8 | Carlos Báez | Puerto Rico | 1:52.6 | 1:52.70 | |

=== Semifinals ===
Qual. rule: first 4 of each heat (Q) qualified.

==== Semifinal 1 ====
| Rank | Athlete | Nation | Time (hand) | Time (automatic) | Notes |
|---|---|---|---|---|---|
| 1 | Walter Adams | West Germany | 1:46.4 | 1:46.41 | Q |
| 2 | Dieter Fromm | East Germany | 1:46.5 | 1:46.54 | Q |
| 3 | Thomas Saisi | Kenya | 1:46.6 | 1:46.64 | Q |
| 4 | Ben Cayenne | Trinidad and Tobago | 1:46.8 | 1:46.83 | Q |
| 5 | Ron Kutschinski | United States | 1:47.3 | 1:47.39 | |
| 6 | Jean-Pierre Dufresne | France | 1:51.8 | 1:51.89 | |
| — | Henryk Szordykowski | Poland | DNS | – | |
| — | Yevhen Arzhanov | Soviet Union | DNS | – | |

==== Semifinal 2 ====
| Rank | Athlete | Nation | Time (hand) | Time (automatic) | Notes |
|---|---|---|---|---|---|
| 1 | Ralph Doubell | Australia | 1:45.7 | 1:45.78 | Q |
| 2 | Wilson Kiprugut | Kenya | 1:45.8 | 1:45.84 | Q |
| 3 | Jozef Plachý | Czechoslovakia | 1:45.9 | 1:45.96 | Q |
| 4 | Tom Farrell | United States | 1:46.1 | 1:46.11 | Q |
| 5 | Robert Ouko | Kenya | 1:47.1 | 1:47.15 | |
| 6 | Byron Dyce | Jamaica | 1:47.2 | 1:47.30 | |
| 7 | Franz-Josef Kemper | West Germany | 1:47.3 | 1:47.47 | |
| 8 | Dave Cropper | Great Britain | 1:47.6 | 1:47.67 | |

=== Final ===
| Rank | Athlete | Nation | Time (hand) | Time (automatic) | Notes |
|---|---|---|---|---|---|
| 1st place, gold medalist(s) | Ralph Doubell | Australia | 1:44.3 | 1:44.40 | =WR, OR |
| 2nd place, silver medalist(s) | Wilson Kiprugut | Kenya | 1:44.5 | 1:44.57 | |
| 3rd place, bronze medalist(s) | Tom Farrell | United States | 1:45.4 | 1:45.46 | |
| 4 | Walter Adams | West Germany | 1:45.8 | 1:45.83 | |
| 5 | Jozef Plachý | Czechoslovakia | 1:45.9 | 1:45.99 | |
| 6 | Dieter Fromm | East Germany | 1:46.2 | 1:46.30 | |
| 7 | Thomas Saisi | Kenya | 1:47.5 | 1:47.59 | |
| 8 | Ben Cayenne | Trinidad and Tobago | 1:54.3 | 1:54.40 | |
