= Arturo Córdoba =

Honduran middle-distance runner

Personal information
- Full name: Luis Arturo Córdoba
- Born: 19 May 1949 (age 77) Tegucigalpa, Honduras

Sport
- Sport: Middle-distance running
- Event: 1500 metres

Luis Arturo Córdoba, also known as Luis Arturo Córdova, (born 19 May 1949) is a Honduran middle-distance runner. During his career, he competed for Honduras at the 1968 Summer Olympics in the men's 1500 metres. There, he had the slowest time amongst all of the competitors in the qualifiers and did not advance further.

== Biography ==
Luis Arturo Córdoba, also known as Luis Arturo Córdova as per the International Olympic Committee, was born on 19 May 1949 in Tegucigalpa, Honduras. As an athlete, he competed for Honduras in international competition.

Córdoba was selected to compete for Honduras at the 1968 Summer Olympics in Mexico City, Mexico, for the nation's first appearance at an Olympic Games. At the 1968 Summer Games, he was entered to compete in one event, the men's 1500 metres held at the Estadio Olímpico Universitario. At the time, he had a height of 170 centimetres (5.6 ft) and a weight of 60 kilograms (130 lb). Córdoba competed in the qualifying heats of the men's 1500 metres on 18 October 1968 in the fifth heat. He competed against eleven other athletes, namely: Byron Dyce, Anders Gärderud, Matias Habtemichael, Ahmed Issa, Hansrüedi Knill, Marty Liquori, Jerzy Maluśki, Frank Murphy, Rudi Simon, John Whetton, and Mikhail Zhelobovskiy. There, Córdoba recorded a time of 5:18.92 and placed last in the heat, failing to advance further to the semifinals held the following day, as only the top five of each heat would be able to. His time was the slowest amongst all of the competitors in the heats who completed the race.
