= Athletics at the 1968 Summer Olympics – Men's 1500 metres =

Men's 1500 metres at the Games of the XIX Olympiad
- Olympic Athletics
- Venue: Estadio Olímpico Universitario, Mexico City
- Date: 18 October 1968 to 20 October 1968
- Competitors: 54 from 37 nations
- Winning time: 3:34.91 OR

Medalists
1st place, gold medalist(s)		Kip Keino; Kenya
2nd place, silver medalist(s)		Jim Ryun; United States
3rd place, bronze medalist(s)		Bodo Tümmler; West Germany

Official Video Highlights

The men's 1500 metres event at the 1968 Summer Olympics in Mexico City was held on 18 to the 20 of October. Fifty-four athletes from 37 nations competed. The maximum number of athletes per nation had been set at 3 since the 1930 Olympic Congress. The event was won by Kenyan Kip Keino, who beat World record holder Jim Ryun, who struggled to adapt to the altitude of Mexico City. It was the first medal for Kenya in the 1500 metres. Bodo Tümmler took bronze, the first medal for West Germany as a separate nation.

As of 2023, the winning margin of 2.98 seconds remains the only time the men's 1500 metres has been won at the Olympics by more than two seconds since the introduction of fully automatic timing.

== Summary ==
While this Olympics was the emergence of Kenyan runners, Kip Keino was not an unknown quantity, he had won the 1966 Commonwealth Games and 1965 African Championships. In the final, it was Ben Jipcho who took the first lap out fast, with Keino lagging to the back of the field. Keino moved up toward the front, but didn't take the lead until two laps to go. When he moved forward, he did so decisively, creating a 30-meter gap on the field. Ryun was known for his last lap kicks. He held back waiting for the bell. At the bell he took off in chase, but Bodo Tümmler was also intent on racing. Ryun was able to beat Tümmler down the backstretch but his last lap kick was no match for the still more than 20 meter lead Keino held onto the final straightaway.

== Background ==
This was the 16th appearance of the event, which is one of 12 athletics events to have been held at every Summer Olympics. Two finalists from 1964 returned: silver medalist Josef Odložil of Czechoslovakia and eighth-place finisher Michel Bernard of France. The favourite at the start of the year was Jim Ryun of the United States, a 1964 Olympic semifinalist who had beaten the world record by 2.5 seconds in 1967. But Ryun had a case of mononucleosis during training (particularly damaging because the 1968 Games were at high altitude, requiring specific training and acclimatization), and was only a "slight favorite" by the time of the race. Kip Keino of Kenya had been beaten by Ryun by 4 seconds in a dual meet in July 1967 (the race where Ryun took the world record).

Bermuda, the Dominican Republic, El Salvador, Guatemala, Honduras, Morocco, Puerto Rico, and Senegal each made their first appearance in the event; West Germany made its first appearance as a separate nation. The United States made its 16th appearance, the only nation to have competed in the men's 1500 metres at each Games to that point.

== Competition format ==
The competition was again three rounds (a format used previously in 1952 and 1964). The 1968 competition did not use the "fastest loser" system introduced in 1964, resulting in uneven semifinals. The competition also returned to a 12-man final, after two Games used 9 in 1960 and 1964.

There were five heats in the first round, each with 11 or 12 runners (before withdrawals). The top five runners in each heat advanced to the semifinals. The 25 semifinalists were divided into two semifinals, one of 12 runners and one of 13. The top six men in each semifinal advanced to the 12-man final.

== Records ==
These were the standing world and Olympic records prior to the 1968 Summer Olympics.

World record	Jim Ryun (USA)	3:33.1	Los Angeles, United States	8 July 1967
Olympic record	Herb Elliott (AUS)	3:35.6	Rome, Italy	6 September 1960

In the final, Kip Keino set a new Olympic record at 3:34.91.

== Schedule ==
All times are Central Standard Time (UTC-6)

Date	Time	Round
Friday, 18 October 1968	11:00	Round 1
Saturday, 19 October 1968	17:20	Semifinals
Sunday, 20 October 1968	15:30	Final

== Results ==
=== Round 1 ===
Top 5 in each heat advance to semifinal.

==== Heat 1 ====
Rank	Athlete	Nation	Time	Notes
1	Kip Keino	Kenya	3:46.96	Q
2	Bodo Tümmler	West Germany	3:51.59	Q
3	John Boulter	Great Britain	3:51.63	Q
4	Jorge Grosser	Chile	3:51.79	Q
5	Franco Arese	Italy	3:51.86	Q
6	Dave Bailey	Canada	3:52.11	
7	Róbert Honti	Hungary	3:54.95	
8	Rudolf Klaban	Austria	3:59.11	
9	Julio Quevedo	Guatemala	4:03.13	
10	Édouard Sagna	Senegal	4:04.12	
11	Emilio Barahona	Honduras	4:56.08	

==== Heat 2 ====
Rank	Athlete	Nation	Time	Notes
1	Tom Von Ruden	United States	3:59.15	Q
2	André Dehertoghe	Belgium	3:59.33	Q
3	Henryk Szordykowski	Poland	3:59.34	Q
4	Claude Nicolas	France	3:59.35	Q
5	Arnd Krüger	West Germany	3:59.40	Q
6	Renzo Finelli	Italy	3:59.51	
7	Ove Berg	Sweden	4:00.42	
8	Tom Hansen	Denmark	4:01.47	
9	Ramasamy Subramaniam	Malaysia	4:06.49	
10	Miguel Núñez	Dominican Republic	4:23.67	
—	Blagoi Kostov	Bulgaria	DNS	

==== Heat 3 ====
Rank	Athlete	Nation	Time	Notes
1	Ben Jipcho	Kenya	3:46.51	Q
2	Oleg Rayko	Soviet Union	3:46.84	Q
3	Harald Norpoth	West Germany	3:47.00	Q
4	Josef Odložil	Czechoslovakia	3:47.49	Q
5	Jacky Boxberger	France	3:47.55	Q
6	José Neri	Mexico	3:47.88	
7	Jorge González	Spain	3:50.49	
8	Ioannis Virvilis	Greece	3:55.57	
9	Xaver Frick, Jr.	Liechtenstein	4:15.38	
10	Alfredo Cubías	El Salvador	4:32.58	
—	Jean Wadoux	France	DNS	

==== Heat 4 ====
Rank	Athlete	Nation	Time	Notes
1	Jim Ryun	United States	3:45.80	Q
2	Hamadi Haddou	Morocco	3:47.01	Q
3	Edgard Salvé	Belgium	3:47.17	Q
4	Arne Kvalheim	Norway	3:47.50	Q
5	Norm Trerise	Canada	3:47.67	Q
6	Gianni Del Buono	Italy	3:48.41	
7	Peter Watson	Australia	3:55.41	
8	Maurice Benn	Great Britain	3:56.43	
9	Pekka Vasala	Finland	4:08.51	
10	Willie Ríos	Puerto Rico	4:14.47	
11	Jeff Payne	Bermuda	4:18.92	
—	Guillermo Cuello	Argentina	DNS	

==== Heat 5 ====
Rank	Athlete	Nation	Time	Notes
1	Marty Liquori	United States	3:52.78	Q
2	Hansrüedi Knill	Switzerland	3:52.87	Q
3	John Whetton	Great Britain	3:53.04	Q
4	Ahmed Issa	Chad	3:53.13	Q
5	Mikhail Zhelobovsky	Soviet Union	3:53.23	Q
6	Matias Habtemichael	Ethiopia	3:53.27	
7	Anders Gärderud	Sweden	3:54.28	
8	Byron Dyce	Jamaica	3:54.65	
9	Jerzy Maluśki	Poland	3:54.83	
10	Frank Murphy	Ireland	3:54.85	
11	Rudi Simon	Belgium	4:06.97	
12	Arturo Córdoba	Honduras	5:18.92	

=== Semifinals ===
Top six in each heat advance to final.

==== Semifinal 1 ====
Rank	Athlete	Nation	Time	Notes
1	Bodo Tümmler	West Germany	3:53.66	Q
2	Jacky Boxberger	France	3:54.00	Q
3	Tom Von Ruden	United States	3:54.12	Q
4	Henryk Szordykowski	Poland	3:54.24	Q
5	Harald Norpoth	West Germany	3:54.34	Q
6	Ben Jipcho	Kenya	3:54.69	Q
7	Franco Arese	Italy	3:54.85	
8	Arne Kvalheim	Norway	3:55.32	
9	John Boulter	Great Britain	3:56.13	
10	Edgard Salvé	Belgium	3:58.16	
11	Mikhail Zhelobovsky	Soviet Union	3:59.08	
12	Hamadi Haddou	Morocco	4:01.70	

==== Semifinal 2 ====
Rank	Athlete	Nation	Time	Notes
1	Jim Ryun	United States	3:51.25	Q
2	Kip Keino	Kenya	3:51.50	Q
3	John Whetton	Great Britain	3:52.05	Q
4	Marty Liquori	United States	3:52.17	Q
5	Josef Odložil	Czechoslovakia	3:52.53	Q
6	André Dehertoghe	Belgium	3:52.57	Q
7	Oleg Rayko	Soviet Union	3:52.73	
8	Ahmed Issa	Chad	3:53.26	
9	Hansrüedi Knill	Switzerland	3:53.65	
10	Norm Trerise	Canada	3:57.30	
11	Claude Nicolas	France	4:04.47	
12	Arnd Krüger	West Germany	4:05.40	
—	Jorge Grosser	Chile	DNF	

=== Final ===
Rank	Athlete	Nation	Time	Notes
1st place, gold medalist(s)	Kip Keino	Kenya	3:34.91	OR
2nd place, silver medalist(s)	Jim Ryun	United States	3:37.89	
3rd place, bronze medalist(s)	Bodo Tümmler	West Germany	3:39.08	
4	Harald Norpoth	West Germany	3:42.57	
5	John Whetton	Great Britain	3:43.90	
6	Jacky Boxberger	France	3:46.65	
7	Henryk Szordykowski	Poland	3:46.69	
8	Josef Odložil	Czechoslovakia	3:48.69	
9	Tom Von Ruden	United States	3:49.27	
10	Ben Jipcho	Kenya	3:51.22	
11	André Dehertoghe	Belgium	3:53.63	
12	Marty Liquori	United States	4:18.22	
