= Juan Valladares =

Honduran long-distance runner

Personal information
- Full name: Juan Ramon Valladares
- Nationality: Honduran
- Born: 22 January 1947 (age 79) Tegucigalpa, Honduras

Sport
- Sport: Long-distance running
- Event: 5000 metres

Juan Ramon Valladares (born 22 January 1947) is a Honduran long-distance runner. During his career, he competed for Honduras at the 1968 Summer Olympics in the men's 5000 metres event. There, he placed last in his qualifying heat and did not advance to the finals of the competition.

== Biography ==
Juan Ramon Valladares was born on 22 January 1947 in Tegucigalpa, Honduras. As an athlete, he competed for Honduras in international competition.

Valladares was selected to compete for Honduras at the 1968 Summer Olympics in Mexico City, Mexico, for the nation's first appearance at an Olympic Games. At the 1968 Summer Games, he was entered to compete in one event, the men's 5000 metres held at the Estadio Olímpico Universitario. At the time, he had a height of 169 centimetres (5.54 ft) and a weight of 57 kilograms (126 lb). Valladares competed in the qualifying heats of the men's 5000 metres on 15 October 1968 in the first heat. He competed against 13 other competitors, namely: Esau Adenji, Bernd Dießner, Bob Finlay, Mohammed Gammoudi, Kipchoge Keino, György Kiss, Gabriel M'Boa, Emiel Puttemans, Keisuke Sawaki, Lou Scott, Rashid Sharafetdinov, Dick Taylor, and Mamo Wolde. Two other competitors, Efraín Cordero and Arne Risa, were also entered to compete in the event but eventually did not start the race. At the event, Valladares recorded a time of 18:21.6 and placed last, failing to advance further to the finals, as only the top five of each heat would be able to. His time was the second-slowest time recorded by a competitor that completed the race in any of the heats.
