= 1971 European Athletics Championships – Men's 10,000 metres =

Men's 10,000 metres at the European Athletics Championships

The men's 10,000 metres at the 1971 European Athletics Championships was held in Helsinki, Finland, at Helsinki Olympic Stadium on 10 August 1971.

== Medalists ==
Gold	Juha Väätäinen; Finland
Silver	Jürgen Haase; East Germany
Bronze	Rashid Sharafetdinov; Soviet Union

== Results ==
=== Final ===
10 August

Rank	Name	Nationality	Time	Notes
1st place, gold medalist(s)	Juha Väätäinen	Finland	27:52.78	CR NR
2nd place, silver medalist(s)	Jürgen Haase	East Germany	27:53.35	NR
3rd place, bronze medalist(s)	Rashid Sharafetdinov	Soviet Union	27:56.26	NR
4	Danijel Korica	Yugoslavia	27:58.38	NR
5	Mariano Haro	Spain	27:59.33	NR
6	Dave Bedford	Great Britain	28:04.33	
7	Mike Tagg	Great Britain	28:14.65	
8	Seppo Tuominen	Finland	28:17.98	
9	Manfred Letzerich	West Germany	28:20.91	NR
10	Noël Tijou	France	28:21.65	
11	Werner Dossegger	Switzerland	28:22.88	NR
12	Lucien Rault	France	28:23.11	
13	Jack Lane	Great Britain	28:24.01	
14	Arne Risa	Norway	28:24.41	NR
15	Joachim Krebs	East Germany	28:26.67	
16	Karel Lismont	Belgium	28:31.17	
17	Lasse Virén	Finland	28:33.12	
18	Nikolay Sviridov	Soviet Union	28:41.09	
19	Josef Jánský	Czechoslovakia	28:43.08	NR
20	René Jourdan	France	28:46.08	
21	Donald Walsh	Ireland	28:52.60	NR
22	Edward Mleczko	Poland	28:55.73	
23	Henryk Piotrowski	Poland	29:01.68	
24	Eckhard Lesse	East Germany	29:02.53	
25	Janos Szerenyi	Hungary	29:03.93	
26	Lajos Mecser	Hungary	29:07.49	
27	Giuseppe Cindolo	Italy	29:13.65	
28	Jens Wollenberg	West Germany	29:25.41	
29	Per Halle	Norway	29:32.25	
30	Josef Wirth	Switzerland	29:33.71	
31	Egbert Nijstadt	Netherlands	29:48.08	
32	Dieter Brand	West Germany	29:59.29	
33	Carlos Lopes	Portugal	30:05.64	
	Gaston Roelants	Belgium	DNF	
	Nedo Farčić	Yugoslavia	DNF	

== Participation ==
According to an unofficial count, 35 athletes from 18 countries participated in the event.

- Belgium (2)
- Czechoslovakia (1)
- East Germany (3)
- Finland (3)
- France (3)
- Hungary (2)
- Ireland (1)
- Italy (1)
- Netherlands (1)
- Norway (2)
- Poland (2)
- Portugal (1)
- Soviet Union (2)
- Spain (1)
- Switzerland (2)
- Great Britain (3)
- West Germany (3)
- Yugoslavia (2)
