= Yemane Negassi =

Ethiopian cyclist

Personal information
- Full name: Yemane Negassi Gebremariam
- Born: 4 April 1946 (age 80) Asmara, British Military Administration of Eritrea

Cycling career
- Sport: Cycling

Amateur team
- Asmara Cycling Junior Team

Yemane Negassi Gebremariam (born 4 April 1946) is an Eritrean former cyclist. He started cycling at the age of fourteen and quickly qualified for a local team, going on to win a local race. Despite his small stature and height, which initially prevented his selection for the 1964 Ethiopian Championships, his friends' fundraising efforts enabled him to participate. Although he won one of the races, this did not automatically qualify him for the Olympic Games.

He competed again and was selected to compete for Ethiopia at the 1964 Summer Olympics. With the Ethiopian team, he competed in the men's team trial and men's individual road race, though he did not medal in either competition. After the games, he won the Enda Mariam cycling race in 1967.

At the 1968 Summer Olympics, he competed again though did not medal in his entered events. He went on hiatus from 1973 until 1979 as no competitions were held in Eritrea due to political tensions. After 1979, he began to cycle again though retired two years later. He was eventually a technical advisor for the Eritrean national team and the president of a cycling federation.

== Early life ==
Yemane Negassi Gebremariam was born on 4 April 1946 in Asmara during the British Military Administration of Eritrea. Negassi saw foreigners, mostly Italian, that lived in the country were interested in racing bicycles. He then began cycling at the age of fourteen; he would rent a bicycle for 10 cents to bike for several hours. During an interview with the International Olympic Committee in 2022, he stated that cycling competitions in the country often had "Berbers" race against Italians; he stated that it was like "a fight against colonialism at that critical time."

== Career ==
=== Early career and Olympic selection ===
With his friends, they had participated in more than ten cycling competitions. His friend and fellow Olympian Fisihasion Ghebreyesus often placed high or won, leading to earning funds to get newer equipment. Negassi had saved up money and bought a second-hand bike. After a competition that led through Asmara, Dekemhare, and back to Asmara, he had qualified to be part of the Asmara Cycling Junior Team. In 1963, he won the Enda Mariam cycling race.

Due to his small stature and low weight, he was not selected to compete at the 1964 Ethiopian Championships. Although he was not selected, his friends raised some money for him to compete. He went on to win the 250 kilometre race but was not an automatic qualifier for the Olympic Team. He was frustrated then returned home upon learning that he was not on the list of preliminary entrants, though after his bus broke down on the way back home, a cycling official had convinced him to go back. He had won against the ones who were on the list and was selected to compete at the 1964 Summer Olympics in Tokyo.

=== Olympic participation and subsequent races ===
Alongside Suleman Ambaye, Mikael Saglimbeni, and Ghebreyesus, he competed in the men's team trial on 14 October at the Hachioji Road Race Course. They placed 26th out of the 33 competitors with a time of 2:53:52.25. Negassi later competed individually in the men's individual road race on 22 October. He did finish his race and was unranked. After the games, Negassi won the 1967 Eritrea National Championships.

Negassi also competed at the 1968 Summer Olympics in Mexico City. Alongside Ghebreyesus, Saglimbeni, and Tekeste Woldu, they competed in the men's team trial on 15 October. They had placed 26th out of the 30 teams that competed in the event. Individually, Negassi competed in the men's individual road race on 23 October. He did not finish the race.

== Career endings and later years ==
From 1973 until 1979, cycling competitions in Eritrea were not held due to political tensions at the time. After 1979, cyclists began to compete again though in 1981, Negassi retired from the sport. He later served as a technical advisor for the Eritrean national team and the president for the Cycling Federation of the Central Region of Eritrea.
