= Athletics at the 1964 Summer Olympics – Men's 1500 metres =

Men's 1500 metres at the Games of the XVIII Olympiad
- Olympic Athletics
- Venue: Olympic Stadium
- Dates: 17–21 October 1964
- Competitors: 43 from 33 nations
- Winning time: 3:38.1

Medalists
1st place, gold medalist(s)		Peter Snell; New Zealand
2nd place, silver medalist(s)		Josef Odložil; Czechoslovakia
3rd place, bronze medalist(s)		John Davies; New Zealand

The men's 1500 metres was the third-longest of the seven men's track races in the Athletics at the 1964 Summer Olympics program in Tokyo. It was held on 17 October, 19 October, and 21 October 1964. 50 athletes from 34 nations entered, with 7 not starting the first round. The maximum number of athletes per nation had been set at 3 since the 1930 Olympic Congress. The first round was held on 17 October, with the semifinals on 19 October and the final on 21 October.

The event was won by Peter Snell of New Zealand; it was the first win by a Kiwi in the event since Jack Lovelock did so in 1936. Snell was also the first man to double in the 800 and 1500 metres races since Albert Hill in 1920. John Davies took bronze, making the first time in any event that New Zealand had two medalists in the same competition.

== Background ==
This was the 15th appearance of the event, which is one of 12 athletics events to have been held at every Summer Olympics. Only two finalists, and no medalists, from 1960 returned: sixth-place finisher Dyrol Burleson of the United States and seventh-place finisher Michel Bernard of France. Silver medalist Michel Jazy of France was entered, but did not start. The favorite was Peter Snell of New Zealand, who had won the 800 metres in 1960 and again in 1964 (with the 800 metres final a day before the 1500 metres first round), as well as breaking the one-mile world record in 1962.

Chad, Hong Kong, Iran, the Ivory Coast, Jamaica, Kenya, and Malaysia each made their first appearance in the event. The United States made its 15th appearance, the only nation to have competed in the men's 1500 metres at each Games to that point.

== Competition format ==
The competition expanded again to three rounds (used previously in 1952, the only prior exception to the two-round format that had been in place since 1908). The 1964 competition introduced the "fastest loser" system, used only in the semifinals at this edition. Previously, advancement depended solely on the runners' place in their heat. The 1964 competition added advancement places to the fastest runners across the heats in the semifinals who did not advance based on place. There were four heats with 12 or 13 runners each (before withdrawals), with the top four runners in each and the next two fastest overall advancing to the semifinals. These 18 semifinalists ran in two heats of 9 men each, with the top four in each heat and the faster of the two fifth-place finishers advancing to the final (a 9-man final, down from 12, had first been used in 1960).

== Records ==
These were the standing world and Olympic records prior to the 1964 Summer Olympics.

World record	Herb Elliott (AUS)	3:35.6	Rome, Italy	6 September 1960
Olympic record	Herb Elliott (AUS)	3:35.6	Rome, Italy	6 September 1960

No new world or Olympic records were set during the competition.

== Schedule ==
All times are Japan Standard Time (UTC+9)

Date	Time	Round
Saturday, 17 October 1964	11:00	Round 1
Monday, 19 October 1964	11:00	Semifinals
Wednesday, 21 October 1964	13:20	Final

== Results ==
=== First round ===
The top four runners in each of the 4 heats advanced, as well as the next two fastest runners from across all heats.

==== Heat 1 ====
Rank	Athlete	Nation	Time	Notes
1	Witold Baran	Poland	3:45.3	Q
2	John Davies	New Zealand	3:45.5	Q
3	Dyrol Burleson	United States	3:45.6	Q
4	Ergas Leps	Canada	3:46.4	Q
5	Bill McKim	Great Britain	3:46.8	
6	Hansrüedi Knill	Switzerland	3:47.2	
7	Denos Adjima Beche	Ivory Coast	3:53.5	
8	Basil Clifford	Ireland	3:54.9	
9	Neville Myton	Jamaica	3:57.0	
10	R. Subramaniam	Malaysia	3:59.4	
—	Ahmed Issa	Chad	DNS	
—	Nguyet Van Ly	Vietnam	DNS	
—	J. G. Neira Carvajal	Colombia	DNS	

==== Heat 2 ====
Rank	Athlete	Nation	Time	Notes
1	Michel Bernard	France	3:44.1	Q
2	Jurgen May	United Team of Germany	3:44.2	Q
3	John Whetton	Great Britain	3:44.2	Q
4	Jim Ryun	United States	3:44.4	Q
5	Karl-Uno Olofsson	Sweden	3:44.8	q
6	Olavi Salonen	Finland	3:46.8	
7	Francesco Bianchi	Italy	3:47.9	
8	Ebrahim Yazdanpanah	Iran	3:54.8	
9	Albie Thomas	Australia	3:54.9	
10	Tira Klai-Angtong	Thailand	4:08.7	
—	Muharrem Dalkilic	Turkey	DNS	
—	Jean Randrianjatovo	Madagascar	DNS	

==== Heat 3 ====
Rank	Athlete	Nation	Time	Notes
1	Kipchoge Keino	Kenya	3:45.8	Q
2	Wolf-Dieter Holtz	United Team of Germany	3:46.6	Q
3	Tom O'Hara	United States	3:46.7	Q
4	Peter Snell	New Zealand	3:46.8	Q
5	Stig Lindback	Sweden	3:47.1	
6	Volker Tulzer	Austria	3:49.0	
7	Rolf Jelinek	Switzerland	3:51.2	
8	Michel Medinger	Luxembourg	3:51.8	
9	Chung Kyo Mo	South Korea	3:53.0	
10	Hugo Walser	Liechtenstein	3:53.3	
11	Anar Khan	Pakistan	3:56.7	
—	Michel Jazy	France	DNS	
—	Manuel Oliveira	Portugal	DNS	

==== Heat 4 ====
Rank	Athlete	Nation	Time	Notes
1	Alan Simpson	Great Britain	3:42.8	Q
2	Jean Wadoux	France	3:43.0	Q
3	Josef Odložil	Czechoslovakia	3:43.2	Q
4	Eugene Allonsius	Belgium	3:43.3	Q
5	Simo Važić	Yugoslavia	3:43.7	q
6	Siegried Valentin	United Team of Germany	3:44.9	
7	Sebsibe Mamo	Ethiopia	3:45.8	
8	Ivan Belytskiy	Soviet Union	3:46.7	
9	Attila Simon	Hungary	3:49.1	
10	Toichi Yamaguchi	Japan	3:56.7	
11	Eric Amevor	Ghana	3:58.4	
12	Patrick Field	Hong Kong	4:02.6	

=== Semifinals ===
The fastest four runners in each of the two semifinals and the fastest remaining runner qualified for the final.

==== Semifinal 1 ====
Rank	Athlete	Nation	Time	Notes
1	Peter Snell	New Zealand	3:38.8	Q
2	Witold Baran	Poland	3:38.9	Q
3	Josef Odložil	Czechoslovakia	3:39.3	Q
4	Michel Bernard	France	3:39.7	Q
5	John Whetton	Great Britain	3:39.9	q
6	Wolf-Dieter Holtz	United Team of Germany	3:42.3	
7	Karl-Uno Olofsson	Sweden	3:44.8	
8	Ergas Leps	Canada	3:51.2	
9	Jim Ryun	United States	3:55.0	

==== Semifinal 2 ====
Rank	Athlete	Nation	Time	Notes
1	Dyrol Burleson	United States	3:41.5	Q
2	Alan Simpson	Great Britain	3:41.5	Q
3	John Davies	New Zealand	3:41.9	Q
4	Jean Wadoux	France	3:41.9	Q
5	Kipchoge Keino	Kenya	3:41.9	
6	Eugene Allonsius	Belgium	3:41.9	
7	Tom O'Hara	United States	3:43.4	
8	Jurgen May	United Team of Germany	3:46.8	
9	Simo Važić	Yugoslavia	3:48.3	

=== Final ===
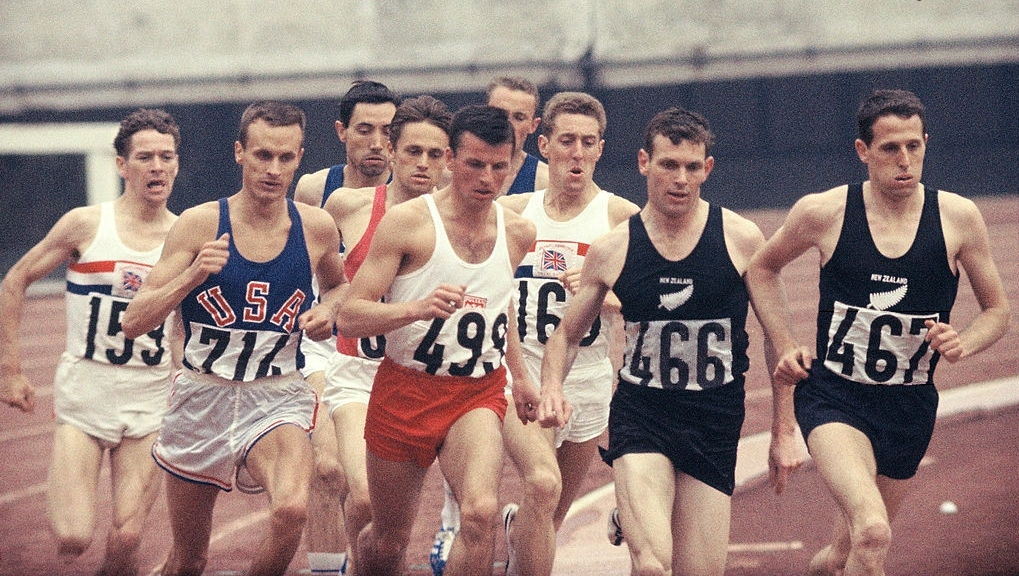
1500 m final: Alan Simpson (155), Dyrol Burleson (714), Witold Baran (499), John Whetton (160), Peter Snell (466), John Davies (467).

World and Olympic record holder, Herb Elliott was not back to defend his title, having retired from the sport at 24 years of age. 1960 800 metre champion Peter Snell entered the Olympics with the intent of duplicating his feat, doubling over similar distances at the previous 1962 Commonwealth Games. He had already lowered Elliott's mile world record by a tick two years earlier. Snell had already successfully defended his 800 metre title.

As had been his typical strategy, Snell chose to stay in a marking position behind the leaders. Splits were recorded at 400 metres, 800 metres, and 1200 metres. Michel Bernard led after the first lap, Josef Odložil and John Davies were in front after two. Wary of being boxed in as he was in the 1960 Olympic 800, at the bell his countryman Davies held the lead while Snell was boxed in by Dyrol Burleson. He slowed then decisively moved to the outside to be in a position to run. Others were also scrambling for position, Witold Baran made his move and had the lead at the end of the third lap but Davies again assumed the lead down the backstretch. With about 220 metres to go, Snell accelerated, blowing past Baran and Davies, the others would now be racing for second place. Snell extended his lead to almost 10 metres, crossing the finish line 1.5 seconds ahead of anyone else. Through the turn, Alan Simpson got around Davies and Baran, behind them Burleson was moving to the outside. Even further back, Odložil began his final sprint around the outside of Burleson. Davies was able to get barely ahead of Simpson, holding him off at the finish line but that would only be for bronze as Odložil came roaring down the home stretch, catching both before the finish to grab silver.

Rank	Athlete	Nation	Time			
Rank	Athlete	Nation	Lap 1	Lap 2	Lap 3	Final
1st place, gold medalist(s)	Peter Snell	New Zealand	0:58.8	2:00.7	2:59.5	3:38.1
2nd place, silver medalist(s)	Josef Odložil	Czechoslovakia	0:59.2	2:00.5	2:59.7	3:39.6
3rd place, bronze medalist(s)	John Davies	New Zealand	0:59.0	2:00.5	2:59.3	3:39.6
4	Alan Simpson	Great Britain	0:58.9	2:01.0	3:00.0	3:39.7
5	Dyrol Burleson	United States	0:58.3	2:01.1	2:59.6	3:40.0
6	Witold Baran	Poland	0:58.7	2:00.8	2:59.4	3:40.3
7	Michel Bernard	France	0:58.0	2:01.3	2:59.7	3:41.2
8	John Whetton	Great Britain	0:58.5	2:00.7	2:59.9	3:42.4
9	Jean Wadoux	France	0:59.3	2:01.5	3:00.3	3:45.4
