= Rodolfo Erazo =

Honduran long-distance runner

Personal information
- Full name: Rodolfo Erazo Santos
- Nationality: Honduran
- Born: 13 February 1946 (age 80) Tegucigalpa, Honduras

Sport
- Sport: Long-distance running
- Event: 10,000 metres

Rodolfo Erazo Santos (born 13 February 1946) is a Honduran long-distance runner. He was selected to compete for Honduras at the 1968 Summer Olympics in the men's 10,000 metres. Though, he eventually dropped out of the race due to the high altitude of the race, leading to exhaustion.

== Biography ==
Rodolfo Erazo Santos was born on 13 February 1946 in Tegucigalpa, Honduras. As an athlete, he competed for Honduras in international competition.

Santos was selected to compete for Honduras at the 1968 Summer Olympics in Mexico City, Mexico, for the nation's first appearance at an Olympic Games. At the 1968 Summer Games, he was entered to compete in one event, the men's 10,000 metres held at the Estadio Olímpico Universitario. At the time, he had a height of 173 centimetres (5.68 ft) and a weight of 59 kilograms (130 lb). Santos competed in the finals of the men's 10,000 metres event on 13 October 1968 against 36 other athletes. There, he was recorded with a "Did not finish" result after being unable to complete the race. During the race, Santos had dropped out of the race due to the high altitude of the host city, leading to exhaustion. With this, he had to be administered oxygen by the medics present in the stadium. The other athletes that were also recorded with this result in the event were men's 1500 metres Olympic champion Kipchoge Keino, Evan Maguire, Alifu Massaquoi, Willy Polleunis, and Edward Stawiarz. The podium of the event was Naftali Temu of Kenya for gold, Mamo Wolde of Ethiopia for silver, and Mohammed Gammoudi of Tunisia for bronze.
