= Ethiopia at the 1964 Summer Olympics =

- IOC code: ETH
- NOC: Ethiopian Olympic Committee

in Tokyo
- Competitors: 12 in 3 sports
- Flag bearer: Abebe Bikila
- Medals Ranked 24th: Gold 1 Silver 0 Bronze 0 Total 1

Summer Olympics appearances (overview)
- 1956; 1960; 1964; 1968; 1972; 1976; 1980; 1984–1988; 1992; 1996; 2000; 2004; 2008; 2012; 2016; 2020; 2024

Ethiopia competed at the 1964 Summer Olympics in Tokyo, Japan. Twelve competitors, all men, took part in eleven events in three sports. Abebe Bikila repeated as Olympic champion in the men's marathon.

== Medalists ==
Medal	Name	Sport	Event	Date
Gold	Abebe Bikila	Athletics	Men's marathon	21 October

== Cycling ==
Four cyclists represented Ethiopia in 1964.

Individual road race

- Mikael Saglimbeni
- Fisihasion Ghebreyesus
- Suleman Ambaye
- Yemane Negassi

Team time trial

- Suleman Ambaye
- Fisihasion Ghebreyesus
- Yemane Negassi
- Mikael Saglimbeni
