= 1968 European Indoor Games – Men's 3000 metres =

The men's 3000 metres event at the 1968 European Indoor Games was held on 10 March in Madrid.

== Results ==
Rank	Name	Nationality	Time	Notes
1st place, gold medalist(s)	Viktor Kudinskiy	Soviet Union	8:10.27	
2nd place, silver medalist(s)	Bernd Dießner	East Germany	8:11.0	
3rd place, bronze medalist(s)	Wolfgang Zur	West Germany	8:11.8	
4	Werner Schneiter	Switzerland	8:12.8	
5	Danijel Korica	Yugoslavia	8:15.4	
6	Miroslav Jůza	Czechoslovakia	8:18.4	
7	Arne Risa	Norway	8:25.0	
