= 1966 European Athletics Championships – Men's 10,000 metres =

Men's 10,000 metres at the European Athletics Championships

The men's 10,000 metres at the 1966 European Athletics Championships was held in Budapest, Hungary, at Népstadion on 30 August 1966.

== Medalists ==
Gold	Jürgen Haase; East Germany
Silver	Lajos Mecser; Hungary
Bronze	Leonid Mikitenko; Soviet Union

== Results ==
=== Final ===
30 August

Rank	Name	Nationality	Time	Notes
1st place, gold medalist(s)	Jürgen Haase	East Germany	28:26.0	
2nd place, silver medalist(s)	Lajos Mecser	Hungary	28:27.0	
3rd place, bronze medalist(s)	Leonid Mikitenko	Soviet Union	28:32.2	
4	Manfred Letzerich	West Germany	28:36.8	
5	Allan Rushmer	Great Britain	28:37.8	
6	Bruce Tulloh	Great Britain	28:50.4	
7	Janos Szerenyi	Hungary	28:52.2	
8	Gaston Roelants	Belgium	28:59.6	
9	Jim Alder	Great Britain	28:59.8	
10	Gennadiy Khlistovs	Soviet Union	29:00.6	
11	Franc Červan	Yugoslavia	29:00.8	NR
12	Lutz Philipp	West Germany	29:07.8	
13	József Sütő	Hungary	29:24.8	
14	Peter Kubicki	West Germany	29:26.0	
15	Bengt Nåjde	Sweden	29:28.8	
16	Gert Eisenberg	East Germany	29:29.8	
17	Nicolae Mustafa	Romania	29:40.0	
18	Kazimierz Zimny	Poland	29:51.2	
19	Josef Tomáš	Czechoslovakia	29:56.0	
20	Şükrü Saban	Turkey	30:30.8	
	Mikko Ala-Leppilampi	Finland	DNF	
	Andrei Barabaș	Romania	DNF	

== Participation ==
According to an unofficial count, 22 athletes from 13 countries participated in the event.

- Belgium (1)
- Czechoslovakia (1)
- East Germany (2)
- Finland (1)
- Hungary (3)
- Poland (1)
- Romania (2)
- Soviet Union (2)
- Sweden (1)
- Turkey (1)
- Great Britain (3)
- West Germany (3)
- Yugoslavia (1)
