= 1969 European Athletics Championships – Men's 10,000 metres =

Men's 10,000 metres at the European Athletics Championships

The men's 10,000 metres at the 1969 European Athletics Championships was held in Athens, Greece, at Georgios Karaiskakis Stadium on 16 September 1969.

== Medalists ==
Gold	Jürgen Haase; East Germany
Silver	Mike Tagg; Great Britain
Bronze	Nikolay Sviridov; Soviet Union

== Results ==
=== Final ===
16 September

Rank	Name	Nationality	Time	Notes
1st place, gold medalist(s)	Jürgen Haase	East Germany	28:41.6	
2nd place, silver medalist(s)	Mike Tagg	Great Britain	28:43.2	
3rd place, bronze medalist(s)	Nikolay Sviridov	Soviet Union	28:45.8	
4	Drago Žuntar	Yugoslavia	28:46.0	
5	Gaston Roelants	Belgium	28:49.8	
6	Michael Freary	Great Britain	28:49.8	
7	René Jourdan	France	28:57.0	
8	Georgi Tikhov	Bulgaria	29:04.0	
9	Noël Tijou	France	29:15.2	
10	Danijel Korica	Yugoslavia	29:16.0	
11	Giuseppe Cindolo	Italy	29:31.0	
12	Henri Le Pape	France	29:41.2	
13	Edward Łęgowski	Poland	29:41.6	
14	Janos Szerenyi	Hungary	29:49.8	
15	Dick Taylor	Great Britain	NT	
16	Denes Simon	Hungary	NT	

== Participation ==
According to an unofficial count, 16 athletes from 10 countries participated in the event.

- Belgium (1)
- Bulgaria (1)
- East Germany (1)
- France (3)
- Hungary (2)
- Italy (1)
- Poland (1)
- Soviet Union (1)
- Great Britain (3)
- Yugoslavia (2)
