= 1966 European Athletics Championships – Men's 5000 metres =

Men's 5000 metres at the European Athletics Championships

The men's 5000 metres at the 1966 European Athletics Championships was held in Budapest, Hungary, at Népstadion on 2 and 4 September 1966.

== Medalists ==
Gold	Michel Jazy; France
Silver	Harald Norpoth; West Germany
Bronze	Bernd Dießner; East Germany

== Results ==
=== Final ===
4 September

Rank	Name	Nationality	Time	Notes
1st place, gold medalist(s)	Michel Jazy	France	13:42.8	CR
2nd place, silver medalist(s)	Harald Norpoth	West Germany	13:44.0	
3rd place, bronze medalist(s)	Bernd Dießner	East Germany	13:47.8	
4	Derek Graham	Great Britain	13:48.0	
5	Lajos Mecser	Hungary	13:48.0	
6	Bengt Nåjde	Sweden	13:48.2	
7	István Kiss	Hungary	13:48.2	
8	Jean-Luc Salomon	France	13:52.0	
9	Manuel de Oliveira	Portugal	13:52.6	
10	Werner Girke	West Germany	13:53.2	
11	Jürgen Haase	East Germany	13:55.6	
12	Edward Stawiarz	Poland	13:56.4	
13	Gennadiy Khlistovs	Soviet Union	14:00.0	
14	René Kilburg	Luxembourg	14:06.2	
15	Eugène Allonsius	Belgium	14:19.4	

=== Heats ===
2 September

==== Heat 1 ====
Rank	Name	Nationality	Time	Notes
1	Jean-Luc Salomon	France	13:49.4	CR Q
2	Harald Norpoth	West Germany	13:50.2	Q
3	Lajos Mecser	Hungary	13:50.2	Q
4	Edward Stawiarz	Poland	13:50.8	Q
5	Manuel de Oliveira	Portugal	13:51.4	NR Q
6	Dick Taylor	Great Britain	13:54.8	
7	Siegfried Herrmann	East Germany	13:57.8	
8	Franc Červan	Yugoslavia	14:00.0	
9	Renzo Finelli	Italy	14:10.0	

==== Heat 2 ====
Rank	Name	Nationality	Time	Notes
1	Jürgen Haase	East Germany	13:59.0	Q
2	István Kiss	Hungary	13:59.6	Q
3	Gennadiy Khlistovs	Soviet Union	13:59.8	Q
4	René Kilburg	Luxembourg	13:59.8	NR Q
5	Eugène Allonsius	Belgium	14:00.0	Q
6	Hans Gerlach	West Germany	14:00.6	
7	Mariano Haro	Spain	14:07.2	
8	No Opdenoordt	Netherlands	14:09.8	
9	Andrei Barabaș	Romania	14:14.0	
10	Thor Helland	Norway	14:23.2	
11	Tim Briault	Great Britain	14:28.6	
12	Czesław Kołodyński	Poland	14:41.4	

==== Heat 3 ====
Rank	Name	Nationality	Time	Notes
1	Michel Jazy	France	13:54.8	Q
2	Derek Graham	Great Britain	13:55.0	Q
3	Bernd Dießner	East Germany	13:55.0	Q
4	Werner Girke	West Germany	13:55.4	Q
5	Bengt Nåjde	Sweden	13:55.8	Q
6	György Kiss	Hungary	13:57.0	
7	Simo Važić	Yugoslavia	13:57.8	
8	Anatoliy Makarov	Soviet Union	13:58.6	
9	Tom O'Riordan	Ireland	14:12.4	
10	Henryk Piotrowski	Poland	14:26.4	
11	Muharrem Dalkılıç	Turkey	14:45.6	

== Participation ==
According to an unofficial count, 32 athletes from 19 countries participated in the event.

- Belgium (1)
- East Germany (3)
- France (2)
- Hungary (3)
- Ireland (1)
- Italy (1)
- Luxembourg (1)
- Netherlands (1)
- Norway (1)
- Poland (3)
- Portugal (1)
- Romania (1)
- Soviet Union (2)
- Spain (1)
- Sweden (1)
- Turkey (1)
- Great Britain (3)
- West Germany (3)
- Yugoslavia (2)
