= 1969 European Athletics Championships – Men's 5000 metres =

Men's 5000 metres at the European Athletics Championships

The men's 5000 metres at the 1969 European Athletics Championships was held in Athens, Greece, at Georgios Karaiskakis Stadium on 19 September 1969.

== Medalists ==
Gold	Ian Stewart; Great Britain
Silver	Rashid Sharafetdinov; Soviet Union
Bronze	Alan Blinston; Great Britain

== Results ==
=== Final ===
19 September

Rank	Name	Nationality	Time	Notes
1st place, gold medalist(s)	Ian Stewart	Great Britain	13:44.8	
2nd place, silver medalist(s)	Rashid Sharafetdinov	Soviet Union	13:45.8	
3rd place, bronze medalist(s)	Alan Blinston	Great Britain	13:47.6	
4	Bernd Dießner	East Germany	13:50.4	
5	Danijel Korica	Yugoslavia	13:51.4	
6	Giuseppe Ardizzone	Italy	13:51.8	
7	Émile Puttemans	Belgium	13:53.2	
8	Bengt Nåjde	Sweden	13:55.8	
9	Noël Tijou	France	13:56.8	
10	René Jourdan	France	13:58.4	
11	Ivan Shopsha	Soviet Union	14:01.8	
12	Stanislav Petr	Czechoslovakia	14:12.8	
13	Mike Baxter	Great Britain	14:19.0	

== Participation ==
According to an unofficial count, 13 athletes from 9 countries participated in the event.

- Belgium (1)
- Czechoslovakia (1)
- East Germany (1)
- France (2)
- Italy (1)
- Soviet Union (2)
- Sweden (1)
- Great Britain (3)
- Yugoslavia (1)
