= Honduras at the 1968 Summer Olympics =

- IOC code: HON
- NOC: Comité Olímpico Hondureño

in Mexico City
- Medals: Gold 0 Silver 0 Bronze 0 Total 0

Summer Olympics appearances (overview)
- 1968; 1972; 1976; 1980; 1984; 1988; 1992; 1996; 2000; 2004; 2008; 2012; 2016; 2020; 2024

Honduras competed at the 1968 Summer Olympics held in Mexico City, Mexico, which were held from 12 to 27 October 1968. This was the nation's debut appearance at the Summer Olympics at a competing capacity. The athlete delegation of the nation consisted of six competitors: sprinter Cristóbal Corrales, middle-distance runners Emilio Barahona and Arturo Córdoba, and long-distance runners Rodolfo Erazo, Clovis Morales, and Juan Valladares. All of them did not win a medal.

== Background ==
The Honduran Olympic Committee was formed and recognized by the International Olympic Committee (IOC) on 20 November 1956 at the 52nd IOC Session held in Melbourne, Australia. Though, it would not be until the 1968 Summer Olympics held in Mexico City, Mexico, where a Honduran team would be competing. The 1968 Summer Games were held from 12 to 27 October 1968. The athlete delegation for the nation had six competitors, all in the sport of athletics.

== Athletics ==
=== Men ===
Long-distance runner Rodolfo Erazo was the first Honduran athlete to compete. He competed in the final of the men's 10,000 on 13 October against 36 other competitors. Though, he dropped out of the race due to the high altitude of the host city, leading to exhaustion. With this, he had to be administered oxygen by the medics present in the stadium.

Sprinter Cristóbal Corrales then competed in the qualifying heats of the men's 200 metres on 15 October in the seventh heat against six other sprinters. There, he recorded a time of 23.93 seconds and placed last, failing to advance to the quarterfinals of the event. Although he did not advance further, his time set a new personal best. Long-distance runners Juan Valladares and Clovis Morales competed on the same day, competing in the qualifying heats of the men's 5000 metres. Valladares competed in heat one against 13 other competitors, recording a time of 18:21.52 and placing 14th, failing to advance further. Morales competed in heat two against 13 other competitors, recording a time of 18:40.13 and placing 14th, also failing to advance further.

Middle-distance runners Emilio Barahona and Arturo Córdoba were the last competitors, competing in the qualifying heats of the men's 1500 metres on 18 October. Barahona competed in the first heat against 10 other competitors and placed last with a time of 4:56.08, failing to advance further. Córdoba then competed in heat five against 11 other competitors and placed last with a time of 5:18.92, also failing to advance further. His time was the slowest amongst the athletes that competed.

Athletics summary
Athlete	Event	Heats		Quarterfinal		Semifinal		Final	
Athlete	Event	Result	Rank	Result	Rank	Result	Rank	Result	Rank
Cristóbal Corrales	200 m	23.93	7	Did not advance					
Emilio Barahona	1500 m	4:56.08	11	—N/a		Did not advance			
Arturo Córdoba	1500 m	5:18.92	12	—N/a		Did not advance			
Juan Valladares	5000 m	18:21.52	14	—N/a				Did not advance	
Clovis Morales	5000 m	18:40.13	14	—N/a				Did not advance	
Rodolfo Erazo	10,000 m	—N/a						Did not finish	
