= 1970 Central American Championships in Athletics =

V Central American Championships in Athletics
- Dates: December 4-6
- Host city: Guatemala City, Guatemala
- Venue: Estadio Mateo Flores
- Level: Senior
- Participation: 4 nations

The fifth Central American Championships in Athletics were held at the Estadio Mateo Flores in Guatemala City, Guatemala, between December 4-6, 1970.

== Medal summary ==
Some results and medal winners could be reconstructed from the archive of Costa Rican newspaper La Nación.

=== Men ===
| Event | Gold | | Silver | | Bronze | |
|---|---|---|---|---|---|---|
| 100 metres | Carlos Abbot (CRC) | 11.0 | Salomón Rowe (GUA) | 11.0 | Pedro Cólon (HON) | |
| 200 metres | Carlos Abbot (CRC) | 22.2 | Roberto Contreras (GUA) | 22.8 | Danilo Reed (GUA) | 23.2 |
| 400 metres | | | | | | |
| 800 metres | | | Santiago Vargas (CRC) | | | |
| 1500 metres | Rafael Ángel Pérez (CRC) | 4:05.2 | Enrique Ramírez (GUA) | 4:08.3 | Sergio Vega (GUA) | 4:08.6 |
| 5000 metres | Julio Quevedo (GUA) | 15:38.7 | Carlos Cuque López (GUA) | 15:39.3 | Luis Gamboa (CRC) | 16:24.4 |
| 10,000 metres | Rafael Ángel Pérez (CRC) | 30:51.1 | Carlos Cuque López (GUA) | 32:14.5 | Fulgencio Hernández (GUA) | 33:21.7 |
| Half Marathon | Rafael Ángel Pérez (CRC) | 1:08 | Carlos Cuque López (GUA) | | Julio Quevedo (GUA) | |
| 110 metres hurdles | | | | | | |
| 400 metres hurdles | | | | | Santiago Vargas (CRC) | |
| 3000 metres steeplechase | | | | | | |
| 4 x 100 metres relay | Guatemala | 44.6 | Costa Rica | 46.3 | Honduras | 46.8 |
| 4 x 400 metres relay | | | | | Honduras; Emilio Barahona; Clovis Morales Chávez; Israel Laitano; Mario Amador | |
| 20 Kilometres Road Walk | Oscar Díaz (ESA) | 2:00:07.4 | Cirilio García (GUA) | 2:06:40.7 | Rosario Equite (GUA) | 2:18:56.0 |
| High jump | | | | | | |
| Pole vault | | | | | | |
| Long jump | Salomón Rowe (GUA) | 7.10 | | | | |
| Triple jump | | | | | | |
| Shot put | | | | | | |
| Discus throw | | | | | | |
| Hammer throw | | | | | | |
| Javelin throw | | | | | | |
| Pentathlon | | | | | | |

=== Women ===
| Event | Gold | | Silver | | Bronze | |
|---|---|---|---|---|---|---|
| 100 metres | Sandra Johnson (CRC) | | | | Brenda Charles (CRC) | |
| 200 metres | Sandra Johnson (CRC) | 25.4 | Miriam Castro (CRC) | 27.6 | Brenda Charles (CRC) | 28.0 |
| 400 metres | Silvia Molina (GUA) | 64.2 | Miriam Castro (CRC) | 66.1 | Casta García (ESA) | |
| 800 metres | Silvia Molina (GUA) | 2:30.0 | Casta García (ESA) | 2:37.2 | Alma Rosa Funes (HON) | 2:39.1 |
| 1500 metres | | | | | | |
| 100 metres hurdles | | | | | | |
| 4 x 100 metres relay | | | | | | |
| High jump | | | | | | |
| Long jump | | | | | | |
| Shot put | | | | | | |
| Discus throw | | | | | | |
| Javelin throw | Carmela de Miller (GUA) | 31.96 | Mayra Soto (CRC) | 29.50 | Celia Vargas (GUA) | 21.96 |
| Pentathlon | | | | | | |
