= Emilio Barahona =

Honduran middle-distance runner (born 1949)

Personal information
- Nationality: Honduran
- Born: 15 April 1949 Tegucigalpa, Honduras
- Died: before 9 September 2014

Sport
- Sport: Middle-distance running
- Event: 1500 metres
Medal record
Men's athletics
Representing Honduras
Central American Championships
| Bronze medal – third place | 1970 Guatemala City | 4 × 400 m relay |

Emilio Barahona (15 April 1949 – date of death unknown) was a Honduran middle-distance runner. As part of the Honduran 4 × 400 metre relay team, they won Honduras' first medal at any edition of the Central American Championships. He also competed in the men's 1500 metres at the 1968 Summer Olympics.

== Biography ==
Emilio Barahona was born on 15 April 1949 in Tegucigalpa, Honduras. As an athlete, he competed for Honduras in international competition.

Barahona was selected to compete for Honduras at the 1968 Summer Olympics in Mexico City, Mexico, for the nation's first appearance at an Olympic Games. At the 1968 Summer Games, he was entered to compete in one event, the men's 1500 metres held at the Estadio Olímpico Universitario. Córdoba competed in the qualifying heats of the men's 1500 metres on 18 October 1968 in the first heat. He competed against ten other athletes. There, he recorded a time of 4:56.08 and placed last, failing to advance further to the semifinals held the following day, as only the top five of each heat would be able to.

He was also selected to compete for Honduras at the 1970 Central American Championships in Athletics held in Guatemala City, Guatemala. He competed as part of the 4 × 400 metre relay team composed of him and his teammates: Clovis Morales Chávez, Israel Laitano, and Mario Amador. There, they won the bronze medal, winning Honduras' first medal of any color at the Central American Championships in Athletics. Barahona also competed at the 1979 Pan American Games held in San Juan, Puerto Rico. During his athletics career, he was nicknamed "El Olímpico". Barahona later died on an unknown date sometime before 9 September 2014.
