= Athletics at the 1973 Summer Universiade – Men's 5000 metres =

The men's 5000 metres event at the 1973 Summer Universiade was held at the Central Lenin Stadium in Moscow on 18 and 20 August.

== Medalists ==
Gold	Silver	Bronze
Mikhail Zhelobovskiy; Soviet Union	Glenn Herold; United States	Valentin Zotov; Soviet Union

== Results ==
=== Heats ===
Rank	Heat	Athlete	Nationality	Time	Notes
1	1	Norman Morrison	Great Britain	13:47.02	Q
2	1	Mikhail Zhelobovskiy	Soviet Union	13:48.0	Q
3	1	Yuval Wischnitzer	Israel	13:48.8	Q
4	1	Carlos Caro	Spain	13:49.0	Q
5	1	Glenn Herold	United States	13:51.0	Q
6	1	Aldo Tomasini	Italy	13:52.8	q
7	1	Luigi Zarcone	Italy	13:56.67	q
8	1	Petko Karpachev	Bulgaria	13:57.0	q
9	1	Mohamed Kacemi	Algeria	14:09.6	
10	1	Patrick Kiingi	Kenya	14:09.6	
11	1	Brendan Layh	Australia	14:22.27	
12	1	Nanzadin Tserenbaljir	Mongolia	15:18.37	
13	1	Mario Valdivia	Chile	15:34.8	
	1	John Hartnett	Ireland	DNF	
	1	Benjamin Abati	Ghana	DNF	
1	2	Julian Goater	Great Britain	13:54.6	Q
2	2	Valentin Zotov	Soviet Union	13:55.4	Q
3	2	Pat Mandera	United States	13:55.8	Q
4	2	Peter Suchán	Czechoslovakia	13:58.2	Q
5	2	Sergio González	Mexico	14:02.30	Q
6	2	Tom Howard	Canada	14:02.95	q
7	2	Gabor Bathori	Hungary	14:09.0	q
8	2	José Bordón	Cuba	14:13.8	
9	2	Takeo Koga	Japan	14:21.0	
10	2	Atallah Rezique	Algeria	14:26.8	
11	2	David Bitarinsaah	Uganda	14:31.90	
12	2	Mohammad Vodjdanzadeh	Iran	14:32.4	
13	2	Francisco Assis	Portugal	14:38.0	
14	2	Clovis Morales	Honduras	15:32.2	
15	2	Lawrence Ofosu	Ghana	15:54.2	
16	2	Lafta Askar Sabri	Kuwait	16:03.4	
	2	Danijel Korica	Yugoslavia	DNF	

=== Final ===
Rank	Athlete	Nationality	Time	Notes
1st place, gold medalist(s)	Mikhail Zhelobovskiy	Soviet Union	13:41.25	
2nd place, silver medalist(s)	Glenn Herold	United States	13:41.87	
3rd place, bronze medalist(s)	Valentin Zotov	Soviet Union	13:43.60	
4	Julian Goater	Great Britain	13:45.17	
5	Aldo Tomasini	Italy	13:46.18	
6	Pat Mandera	United States	13:46.48	
7	Norman Morrison	Great Britain	13:50.8	
8	Peter Suchán	Czechoslovakia	13:55.6	
9	Yuval Wischnitzer	Israel	14:01.4	
10	Sergio González	Mexico	14:03.8	
11	Tom Howard	Canada	14:06.2	
12	Petko Karpachev	Bulgaria	14:08.8	
13	Gabor Bathori	Hungary	14:16.0	
14	Luigi Zarcone	Italy	14:23.2	
15	Carlos Caro	Spain	14:36.6	
