= Cristóbal Corrales =

Honduran sprinter

Personal information
- Nationality: Honduran
- Born: 23 April 1947 (age 79) Tegucigalpa, Honduras

Sport
- Sport: Sprinting
- Event: 200 metres

Cristóbal Corrales (born 23 April 1947) is a Honduran sprinter. During his career, he competed for Honduras at the 1968 Summer Olympics in the men's 200 metres. There, he had the slowest time amongst all of the competitors in the qualifiers and did not advance further.

== Biography ==
Cristóbal Corrales was born on 23 April 1947 in Tegucigalpa, Honduras. As an athlete, he competed for Honduras in international competition.

Corrales was selected to compete for Honduras at the 1968 Summer Olympics in Mexico City, Mexico, for the nation's first appearance at an Olympic Games. At the 1968 Summer Games, he was entered to compete in one event, the men's 200 metres held at the Estadio Olímpico Universitario. At the time, he had a height of 168 centimetres (5.51 ft) and a weight of 68 kilograms (150 lb). Corrales competed in the qualifying heats of the men's 200 metres on 15 October 1968 in the seventh heat. He competed against six other competitors, namely: Ralph Banthorpe, Pedro Grajales, Nikolay Ivanov, Greg Lewis, Gert Metz, and Carl Plaskett. Another competitor, Hassan El-Mech, was also entered in the seventh heat but did not start the event. At the event, Corrales recorded a time of 23.93 and placed last in the heat, failing to advance further to the quarterfinals held the same day, as only the top four of each heat and next four fastest competitors would be able to. His time was the slowest amongst all of the competitors in the heats who completed the race, and the slowest out of any competitor in any of the rounds. Though, his result set a new personal best time in the distance.
