= Ioannis Virvilis =

Greek middle-distance runner

Personal information
- Nationality: Greek
- Born: 7 May 1941 (age 85)

Sport
- Sport: Middle-distance running
- Event: 1500 metres

Ioannis Virvilis (born 7 May 1941) is a Greek middle-distance runner. He competed in the men's 1500 metres at the 1968 Summer Olympics.
