= Gilles Sibon =

French middle-distance runner

Personal information
- Nationality: French
- Born: 28 September 1945 (age 80)

Sport
- Sport: Middle-distance running
- Event: 800 metres

Gilles Sibon (born 28 September 1945) is a French middle-distance runner. He competed in the men's 800 metres at the 1968 Summer Olympics.
