= Édouard Sagna =

Senegalese middle-distance runner

Personal information
- Nationality: Senegalese
- Born: 11 September 1940 (age 85)

Sport
- Sport: Middle-distance running
- Event: 1500 metres

Édouard Sagna (born 11 September 1940) is a Senegalese middle-distance runner. He competed in the men's 1500 metres at the 1968 Summer Olympics.
