= Basil Clifford =

Irish middle-distance runner

Personal information
- Nationality: Irish
- Born: 20 April 1938
- Died: 14 November 1973 (aged 35)

Sport
- Sport: Middle-distance running
- Event: 1500 metres

Basil Clifford (20 April 1938 – 14 November 1973) was an Irish middle-distance runner. He competed in the men's 1500 metres at the 1964 Summer Olympics. He was killed in an explosion at a gun factory in Birmingham in November 1973.
