= Mike Tagg =

British former long-distance runner (born 1946)

Personal information
- Nationality: British (English)
- Born: 13 November 1946 (age 79) East Ruston, Norfolk, England
- Height: 1.85 m (6 ft 1/2 in)
- Weight: 60 kg (132 lb)

Sport
- Sport: Athletics
- Event: long distance
- Club: Norfolk Olympiades; Reading University AC

Achievements and titles
- Personal best(s): 2 miles: 8:28.2 (1971); 5000 metres: 13:41.4 (1971); 10,000 metres: 28:14.65 (1971)
Medal record
Men's athletics
Representing Great Britain
European Championships
Silver medal – second place	1969 Athens	10,000 metres
Summer Universiade
Bronze medal – third place	1967 Tokyo	10,000 metres

Michael John Tagg (born 13 November 1946) is a British former long-distance runner. He finished second in the 10,000 metres at the 1969 European Championships and competed at the 1968 Summer Olympics.

== Biography ==
Tagg was born in East Ruston, Norfolk.

Tagg finished second behind Tim Johnston in the 6 miles event at the 1968 AAA Championships and later that year at the 1968 Olympic Games in Mexico City, he represented Great Britain in the 10,000 metres, finishing 13th. His sister, Mary Green, competed at the same Games.

Tagg finished runner-up behind Dick Taylor at the 1969 AAA Championships before winning a silver medal at the 1969 European Championships in Athens, in a time of 28:43.2, losing only to East Germany's Jürgen Haase; Track & Field News ranked him fourth in the world in his event that year.

Two years later in Helsinki Tagg placed seventh, setting his eventual personal best of 28:14.65; he also set his personal bests for two miles (8:28.2) and 5000 metres (13:41.4) that year.
