= Norm Trerise =

Canadian middle-distance runner

Personal information
- Nationality: Canadian
- Born: 3 June 1947 (age 79)

Sport
- Sport: Middle-distance running
- Event: 1500 metres

Norm Trerise (born 3 June 1947) is a Canadian middle-distance runner. He competed in the men's 1500 metres at the 1968 Summer Olympics.

Trerise competed for the Oregon Ducks track and field team in the NCAA, where he ran alongside Steve Prefontaine.
