= Wolf-Dieter Holtz =

German middle-distance runner

Personal information
- Nationality: German
- Born: 10 December 1941 (age 84)

Sport
- Sport: Middle-distance running
- Event: 1500 metres

Wolf-Dieter Holtz (born 10 December 1941) is a German middle-distance runner. He competed in the men's 1500 metres at the 1964 Summer Olympics.
