= Oleg Rayko =

Soviet middle-distance runner

Personal information
- Nationality: Soviet
- Born: 8 June 1945 (age 81)

Sport
- Sport: Middle-distance running
- Event: 1500 metres

Oleg Rayko (born 8 June 1945) is a Soviet middle-distance runner. He competed in the men's 1500 metres at the 1968 Summer Olympics.
