= Fikru Deguefu =

Ethiopian long-distance runner

Personal information
- Nationality: Ethiopian
- Born: 28 February 1937 (age 89)

Sport
- Sport: Long-distance running
- Event: 5000 metres

Fikru Deguefu (born 28 February 1937) is an Ethiopian long-distance runner. He competed in the men's 5000 metres at the 1968 Summer Olympics, ranking 8th in the final. He also competed in the men's 10,000 metres, ranking 14th in the final.
