= Toichi Yamaguchi =

Japanese middle-distance runner

Personal information
- Nationality: Japanese
- Born: 15 December 1941 (age 84)

Sport
- Sport: Middle-distance running
- Event: 1500 metres

Toichi Yamaguchi (山口 東一, Yamaguchi Tōichi; born 15 December 1941) is a Japanese middle-distance runner. He competed in the men's 1500 metres at the 1964 Summer Olympics.
