= Eric Amevor =

Ghanaian middle-distance runner

Personal information
- Nationality: Ghanaian
- Born: 16 April 1938 (age 88)

Sport
- Sport: Middle-distance running
- Event: 1500 metres

Eric Amevor (born 16 April 1938) is a Ghanaian middle-distance runner. He competed in the men's 1500 metres at the 1964 Summer Olympics.
