= Ivan Belytskiy =

Ukrainian middle-distance runner

Ivan Belytskyi
Personal information
- Nationality: Ukrainian
- Born: 25 October 1936 (age 89) Kharkiv, Ukrainian SSR, Soviet Union

Sport
- Sport: Middle-distance running
- Event: 1500 metres

Ivan Belytskyi (ukr. Іван Белицький, born 25 October 1936) is a Ukrainian middle-distance runner. He competed in the men's 1500 metres at the 1964 Summer Olympics, representing the Soviet Union.
