= Maurice Benn =

British middle-distance runner

Personal information
- Nationality: British
- Born: 9 November 1946 (age 79)

Sport
- Sport: Middle-distance running
- Event: 1500 metres

Maurice Benn (born 9 November 1946) is a British middle-distance runner. He competed in the men's 1500 metres at the 1968 Summer Olympics.
