= Jun Nagai =

Japanese middle-distance runner

Personal information
- Nationality: Japanese
- Born: 20 May 1944 (age 81)

Sport
- Sport: Middle-distance running
- Event: 800 metres

Jun Nagai (永井 純, Nagai Jun; born 20 May 1944) is a Japanese middle-distance runner. He competed in the men's 800 metres at the 1968 Summer Olympics.
