= Vyacheslav Alanov =

Soviet long-distance runner

Personal information
- Full name: Vyacheslav Nikolayevich Alanov
- Nationality: Soviet
- Born: 30 October 1939 Buinsky District, Tatar ASSR, USSR
- Died: 26 August 1983 (aged 43) Sverdlovsk, USSR
- Height: 172 cm (5 ft 8 in)
- Weight: 59 kg (130 lb)

Sport
- Sport: Long-distance running
- Event: 10,000 metres

Vyacheslav Nikolayevich Alanov (Russian: Вячесла́в Никола́евич Ала́нов; 30 October 1939 – 26 August 1983) was a Soviet long-distance runner. He competed in the men's 10,000 metres at the 1968 Summer Olympics.
