= Jeff Payne =

Bermudian middle-distance runner

Personal information
- Nationality: Bermudian
- Born: 25 September 1938 (age 87) London, England

Sport
- Sport: Middle-distance running
- Event: 1500 metres

Jeff Payne (born 25 September 1938) is a Bermudian middle-distance runner. He competed in the men's 1500 metres at the 1968 Summer Olympics.
