= Bill McKim =

British middle-distance runner (1941–2023)

Personal information
- Full name: William R. McKim
- Nationality: British
- Born: 1 October 1941
- Died: June 2023 (aged 81)

Sport
- Sport: Middle-distance running
- Event: 1500 metres

William R. McKim (1 October 1941 – June 2023) was a British middle-distance runner. He competed in the men's 1500 metres at the 1964 Summer Olympics. McKim died in June 2023, at the age of 81.
