= John Ametepey =

Ghanaian middle-distance runner

Personal information
- Nationality: Ghanaian
- Born: 25 December 1938 (age 87) Attavi, Ghana

Sport
- Sport: Middle-distance running
- Event: 800 metres

John Ametepey (born 25 December 1938) is a Ghanaian middle-distance runner. He competed in the men's 800 metres at the 1968 Summer Olympics.
