= André Pollmächer =

German long-distance runner (born 1983)

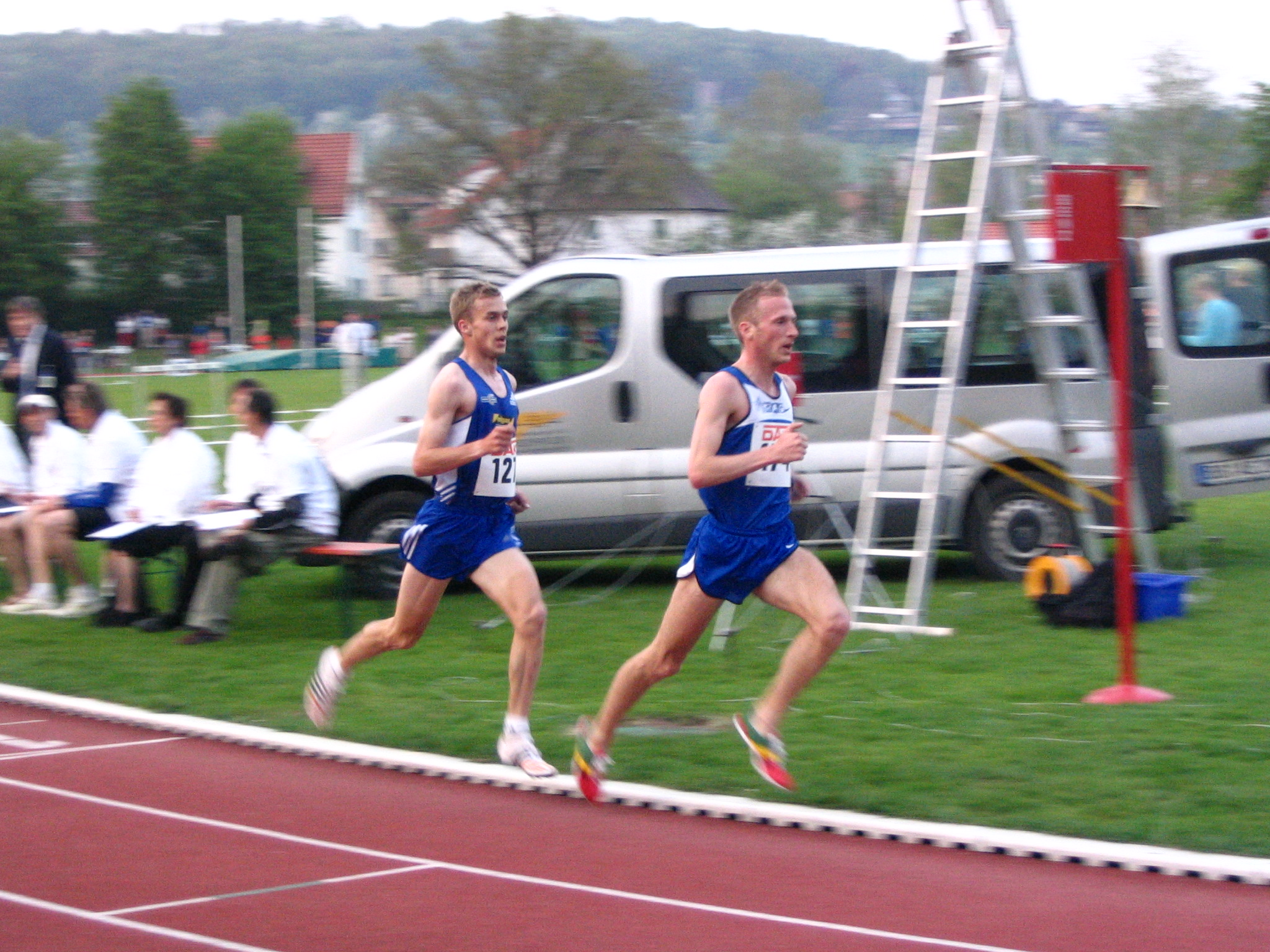
- Pollmächer (left) and Jan Fitschen at German 10,000 m championship in Tübingen, 2006

Personal information
- Full name: Frank André Pollmächer
- Born: 22 March 1983 (age 42) Riesa, Bezirk Dresden, East Germany

Sport
- Country: Germany
- Sport: Athletics
- Event(s): 5000 m, 10,000 m

Frank André Pollmächer (born 22 March 1983 in Riesa) is a German long-distance runner who specializes in the 5,000 and 10,000 metres.

== Biography ==
Pollmächer finished seventh in the 10,000 metres final at the 2006 European Athletics Championships in Gothenburg. His personal best time is 27:55.66 minutes, achieved in June 2007 in Dommelhof. He was 18th in the men's marathon at the 2009 World Championships in Athletics.

He returned to the track after a four-year break and claimed the bronze medal at the European Cup 10,000m in Oslo.

Pollmächer competes for LAC Erdgas Chemnitz and trains under Bernd Dießner. He is the older brother of Anja Pollmächer.
