= Denos Adjima Beche =

Ivorian middle-distance runner

Personal information
- Nationality: Ivorian
- Born: 30 November 1943 (age 82)
- Died: 20/10/1998 Brofodoume sp anyama

Sport
- Sport: Middle-distance running
- Event: 1500 metres

Denos Adjima Beche (born 30 November 1943) is an Ivorian middle-distance runner. He competed in the men's 1500 metres at the 1964 Summer Olympics.
