= Julio Quevedo =

Guatemalan athlete (1939–2025)

Personal information
- Full name: Julio Faustino Quevedo Elias
- Born: 17 October 1939 San Martín, Guatemala
- Died: 9 June 2025 (aged 85)

Sport
- Country: Guatemala
- Sport: Men's Athletics
Medal record
Men's Athletics
Representing Guatemala
Central American Games
Silver medal – second place	1973 Guatemala City	1500 m
Silver medal – second place	1973 Guatemala City	5000 m
Silver medal – second place	1973 Guatemala City	10,000 m
Central American and Caribbean Championships
Bronze medal – third place	1967 Xalapa	5000 m
Central American Championships
Gold medal – first place	1970 Guatemala City	5000 m
Gold medal – first place	1968 Managua	1500 m
Silver medal – second place	1972 Panama City	1500 m
Bronze medal – third place	1971 San José	10,000 m
Bronze medal – third place	1970 Guatemala City	Half marathon
- Updated on 24 September 2012

Julio Faustino Quevedo Elias (17 October 1939 – 9 June 2025) was a Guatemalan athlete who competed in multiple Summer Olympics. Quevedo won a bronze medal at the 1967 Central American and Caribbean Championships in Athletics in the 5000 m. At the 1968 and 1972 Summer Games, he participated in a total of six events. In 1968, he ran in the 1,500 m, 3,000 m steeplechase and 5,000 m events. Four years later, he again ran in the 3,000 m steeplechase and competed in the 10,000 m and marathon; he finished 54th in the latter event. Quevedo posted his career-best marathon time of 2:27:20 the next year. His top marks in other disciplines had been set between 1968 and 1971. In the 1,500 m, he had a best time of 3:58.1 in 1968; Quevedo then set personal records in the 5,000 m (14:20.4) and 10,000 m (30:06.8) in 1970 and the next year had his fastest time, 9:22.5, in the 3,000 m steeplechase.

Quevedo died on 9 June 2025, aged 85.

== Achievements ==
Year	Competition	Venue	Position	Event	Notes
Representing Guatemala
1959	Central American and Caribbean Games	Caracas, Venezuela	–	1500 m	NT
1959	Central American and Caribbean Games	Caracas, Venezuela	–	3000 m s'chase	NT
1966	Central American and Caribbean Games	San Juan, Puerto Rico	5th (h)	1500 m	4:21.1
1966	Central American and Caribbean Games	San Juan, Puerto Rico	7th	3000 m s'chase	NT
1967	Central American and Caribbean Championships	Xalapa, Mexico	3rd	5000 m	16:02.0 A
1968	Central American Championships	Managua, Nicaragua	1st	1500 m	4:02.3
1968	Olympic Games	Mexico City, Mexico	9th (h)	1500 m	4:03.13
1968	Olympic Games	Mexico City, Mexico	9th (h)	5000 m	15:23.0
1968	Olympic Games	Mexico City, Mexico	12th (h)	3000 m s'chase	9:48.37
1970	Central American and Caribbean Games	Panama City, Panama	5th	5000 m	14:45.2
1970	Universiade	Turin, Italy	8th (h)	5000 m	14:20.4
1970	Universiade	Turin, Italy	7th	10,000 m	30:06.8
1970	Central American Championships	Guatemala City, Guatemala	1st	5000 m	15:38.7
1970	Central American Championships	Guatemala City, Guatemala	3rd	Half marathon	
1971	Central American and Caribbean Championships	Kingston, Jamaica	5th	3000 m s'chase	9:32.4
1971	Central American and Caribbean Championships	Kingston, Jamaica	10th	Half marathon	1:32:08
1971	Central American Championships	San José, Costa Rica	3rd	10,000 m	31:37.6
1972	Olympic Games	Munich, West Germany	14th (h)	10,000 m	30:08.4
1972	Olympic Games	Munich, West Germany	13th (h)	3000 m s'chase	9:28.4
1972	Olympic Games	Munich, West Germany	54th	Marathon	2:40:38
1972	Central American Championships	Panama City, Panama	2nd	1500 m	3:56.5
1973	Central American Games	Guatemala City, Guatemala	2nd	1500 m	
1973	Central American Games	Guatemala City, Guatemala	2nd	5000 m	
1973	Central American Games	Guatemala City, Guatemala	2nd	10,000 m	
1974	Central American and Caribbean Games	Santo Domingo, Dominican Republic	12th	10,000 m	31:55.0
