= Ethiopia at the 1968 Summer Olympics =

- IOC code: ETH (ETI used at these Games)
- NOC: Ethiopian Olympic Committee

in Mexico City
- Competitors: 18 (all men) in 3 sports
- Flag bearer: Abebe Bikila
- Medals Ranked 25th: Gold 1 Silver 1 Bronze 0 Total 2

Summer Olympics appearances (overview)
- 1956; 1960; 1964; 1968; 1972; 1976; 1980; 1984–1988; 1992; 1996; 2000; 2004; 2008; 2012; 2016; 2020; 2024

Ethiopia competed at the 1968 Summer Olympics in Mexico City, Mexico. 18 competitors, all men, took part in 13 events in 3 sports.

== Medalists ==
=== Gold ===
- Mamo Wolde — Athletics, men's marathon

=== Silver ===
- Mamo Wolde — Athletics, men's 10000 metres

== Cycling ==
Five cyclists represented Ethiopia in 1968.

Individual road race

- Tekeste Woldu
- Yemane Negassi
- Mehari Okubamicael
- Mikael Saglimbeni

Team time trial

- Yemane Negassi
- Fisihasion Ghebreyesus
- Mikael Saglimbeni
- Tekeste Woldu
