= Alan Blinston =

British long-distance runner

Personal information
- Nationality: British (English)
- Born: 15 June 1944 (age 82) Altrincham, England
- Height: 178 cm (5 ft 10 in)
- Weight: 66 kg (146 lb)

Sport
- Sport: Athletics
- Event: long distance
- Club: Aldershot, Farnham & District AC
Medal record
Men's athletics
Representing Great Britain
European Championships
Bronze medal – third place	1969 Athens	5000 m

John Alan Blinston (born 15 June 1944) is a British former long-distance runner who competed in the 1968 Summer Olympics.

== Biography ==
At the 1968 Olympic Games in Mexico City, he represented Great Britain in 5000 metres competition.

Blinston finished second behind Ian Stewart in the 5000 metres event at the 1969 AAA Championships. Also that year he was a bronze medallist in the 5000 metres at the 1969 European Athletics Championships.

Blinston finished runner-up again at the 1970 AAA Championships and 1971 AAA Championships. He was also a team silver medallist at the 1975 IAAF World Cross Country Championships.

Blinston has eight career wins.
