= Athletics at the 1973 Central American Games =

Athletics at the I Central American Games
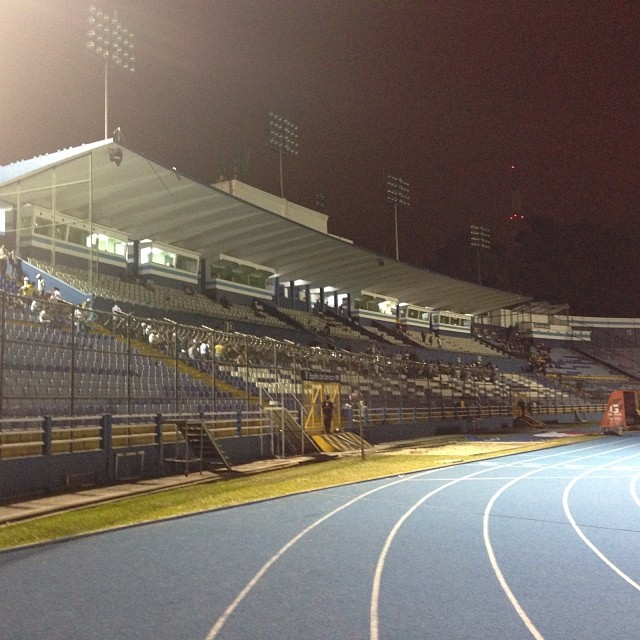
- Mateo Flores Stadium
- Dates: November
- Host city: Guatemala City, Guatemala
- Venue: Estadio Nacional Mateo Flores
- Level: Senior
- Events: 38 (24 men, 14 women)
- Participation: 6 nations

Athletics competitions at the 1973 Central American Games were held at the Estadio Nacional Mateo Flores in Guatemala City, Guatemala, in November 1973.

A total of 38 events were contested, 24 by men and 14 by women.

== Medal summary ==
Gold medal winners and their results were published. A complete list of medal winners can be found on the MásGoles webpage (click on "JUEGOS CENTROAMERICANOS" in the low right corner). Gold medalists were also published in other sources. A couple of results can be found in the archives of Costa Rican newspaper La Nación.

All results are marked as "affected by altitude" (A), because Ciudad de Guatemale is located at 1,592 m above sea level.

=== Men ===
Event	Gold		Silver		Bronze	
100 metres	Rolando Mendieta (PAN)	10.9 A	Irwin Weeks (PAN)		Carlos Aguilar (GUA)	
200 metres	Rolando Mendieta (PAN)	22.1 A	Irwin Weeks (PAN)		Carlos Abott (CRC)	
400 metres	Ricardo Worrel (PAN)	48.2 A	Carlos Abott (CRC)	48.9 A	Francisco Menocal (NCA)	
800 metres	Santiago Vargas (CRC)	1:58.9 A	Enrique Ramírez (GUA)	1:59.7 A	José Blackburn (PAN)	2:01.0 A
1500 metres	Enrique Ramírez (GUA)	4:04.0 A	Julio Quevedo (GUA)		Santiago Vargas (CRC)	
5000 metres	Rafael Ángel Pérez (CRC)	15:05.2 A	Julio Quevedo (GUA)		Virgilio Herrera (GUA)	
10000 metres	Rafael Ángel Pérez (CRC)	31:17.4 A	Julio Quevedo (GUA)		Virgilio Herrera (GUA)	
Marathon	Carlos Cuque López (GUA)	2:23:52 A	Clovis Morales (HON)	2:34:39.7 A	Juan Contreras (GUA)	2:40:08.7 A
110 metres hurdles	Ricardo Worrel (PAN)	15.2 A	César Duff (PAN)		Omar Martínez (GUA)	
400 metres hurdles	Ricardo Worrel (PAN)	54.2 A	Francisco Menocal (NCA)		Luis Escobar (ESA)	
3000 metres steeplechase	Rafael Ángel Pérez (CRC)	9:42.8 A	Luis Gamboa (CRC)	10:01.7 A	Juan Garrido (GUA)	10:14.4 A
4 x 100 metres relay	Panama; Rolando Mendieta; César Duff; Martin; Irwin Weeks	43.1 A	Guatemala; Carlos Aguilar; Óscar Gallardo; Mayorga; Omar Martínez		Costa Rica	
4 x 400 metres relay	Guatemala; Óscar Gallardo; Enrique Ramírez; Belarmino Peláez; Salomón Rowe	3:21.4 A	Panama		Costa Rica	
20 Kilometres Road Walk	Juan Solórzano (NCA)	1:53:58 A	Raúl Lanza (HON)		Carlos Vanegas (NCA)	
50 Kilometres Road Walk	Hipólito López (HON)	5:35:29 A	Carlos Vanegas (NCA)		Cirilo Sequén (GUA)	
High jump	Roberto McFarlane (CRC)	1.75 A	Omar Martínez (GUA)		Yodi Elizondo (NCA)	
Pole vault	Luis Rossi (PAN)	4.04 A	Luis Pérez (CRC)		Héctor Olano (ESA)	
Long jump	Salomón Rowe (GUA)	7.77 A	Martin Douglas (CRC)		Roberto McFarlane (CRC)	
Triple jump	César Duff (PAN)	14.91 A	Martin Douglas (CRC)	14.44 A	Salomón Rowe (GUA)	
Shot put	Roberto Ibáñez (PAN)	14.30 A	Mauricio Jubis (ESA)		Iván Turcios (NCA)	
Discus throw	Joaquín Rodas Peña (ESA)	45.08 A	Armando Mejía (NCA)		Iván Turcios (NCA)	
Hammer throw	Juan Pedro Varela (ESA)	47.22 A	Francisco Argüello (NCA)		René Lynch (PAN)	
Javelin throw	José Peralta (NCA)	57.94 A^{*}	Rudy Aguilar (ESA)		René Lynch (PAN)	
Decathlon	José Peralta (NCA)	5383 A	José Vega (CRC)		Rafael Santos (ESA)	

=== Women ===
Event	Gold		Silver		Bronze	
100 metres	Diva Bishop (PAN)	12.0 A	Margarita Martínez (PAN)		Patricia Meighan (GUA)	
200 metres	Diva Bishop (PAN)	24.2 A	Patricia Meighan (GUA)		Clotilde Morales (PAN)	
400 metres	Patricia Meighan (GUA)	57.6 A	Mirna Ambursley (PAN)		Ruby Callist (PAN)	
800 metres	Mirna Ambursley (PAN)	2:23.2 A	Thelma Zúñiga (CRC)	2:27.4 A	Marielos Machado (CRC)	2:27.4 A
1500 metres	Thelma Zúñiga (CRC)	5:13.0 A	Mirna Ambursley (PAN)		Marielos Machado (CRC)	
100 metres hurdles	Beatriz de Knight (PAN)	15.6 A	Yolanda Knight (PAN)		Mayra Figueroa (GUA)	
4 x 100 metres relay	Panama; Margarita Martínez; Beatriz de Knight; Clotilde Morales; Diva Bishop	49.0 A	Guatemala; Mayra Figueroa; Ingrid Brenner; González; Patricia Meighan		Costa Rica	
4 x 400 metres relay	Panama; Ruby Callist; Diva Bishop; Borland; Mirna Ambursley	3:59.7 A	Guatemala; Maribel González; Ingrid Brenner; González; Patricia Meighan		Costa Rica	
High jump	Diva Bishop (PAN)	1.45 A	Evelyn Mena (ESA)		Patricia Luna (GUA)	
Long jump	Flora Aminta Torres (ESA)	5.11 A	Ingrid Brenner (GUA)		Beatriz de Knight (PAN)	
Shot put	Marta Regina Vásquez (ESA)	12.03 A	Lisbeth Matzford (GUA)		Celia de Martinez (GUA)	
Discus throw	Patricia Comandari (ESA)	37.98 A	Lisbeth Matzford (GUA)		Marta Regina Vásquez (ESA)	
Javelin throw	Evelyn Mena (ESA)	36.38 A^{*}	Geraldina Portillo (ESA)		Cynthia Porras (NCA)	
Pentathlon	Yolanda Knight (PAN)	2977 A	Flora Aminta Torres (ESA)		Ingrid Brenner (GUA)	

== Notes ==
^{*}: Original model javelin.

== Medal table (unofficial) ==
* Host nation (Guatemala)

Rank	Nation	Gold	Silver	Bronze	Total
1	Panama (PAN)	17	8	6	31
2	Costa Rica (CRC)	6	7	9	22
3	El Salvador (ESA)	6	5	4	15
4	Guatemala (GUA)*	5	12	13	30
5	Nicaragua (NIC)	3	4	6	13
6	Honduras	1	2	0	3
Totals (6 entries)		38	38	38	114
