= Tsugumichi Suzuki =

Japanese long-distance runner

Personal information
- Nationality: Japanese
- Born: 16 October 1945 (age 80) Shioya, Tochigi, Japan

Sport
- Sport: Long-distance running
- Event: 10,000 metres

Tsugumichi Suzuki (鈴木 従道, Suzuki Tsugumichi; born 16 October 1945) is a Japanese long-distance runner. He competed in the men's 10,000 metres at the 1968 Summer Olympics.
