= Ian Stewart (runner) =

Scottish long-distance runner (born 1949)

Personal information
- Nationality: British
- Born: 15 January 1949 (age 77) Handsworth, Birmingham, England
- Height: 178 cm (5 ft 10 in)
- Weight: 65 kg (143 lb)

Sport
- Sport: Athletics
- Events: 1500 meters, 5000 meters, Cross country
- Club: Birchfield Harriers; Tipton Harriers
Medal record
Men's athletics
Representing Great Britain
Olympic Games
Bronze medal – third place	1972 Munich	5000 metres
European Championships
Gold medal – first place	1969 Athens	5000 metres
European Indoor Championships
Gold medal – first place	1975 Katowice	3000 m
World Cross Country Championships
Gold medal – first place	1975 Rabat	Senior race
Representing Scotland
International Cross Country Championships
Bronze medal – third place	1972 Cambridge	Senior race
Commonwealth Games
Gold medal – first place	1970 Edinburgh	5000 metres

Ian Stewart MBE (born 15 January 1949) is a Scottish former long-distance running athlete. Stewart was one of the world's leading distance runners between the late 1960s and mid-1970s. Stewart won the bronze medal in the Men's 5000 metres at the 1972 Summer Olympics in Munich (a race won by Lasse Virén). Stewart also won the following championships: European 5,000 metres (1969), Commonwealth 5,000 metres (1970), European Indoor (1969 and 1975) and World Cross Country (1975).

== Biography ==
In 1965, at 16 years of age, he ran a British age best of 9.12.8 for 2 miles and two years later set a European junior 3 miles record of 13.39.8. In 1968, he broke European junior records at four distances: 3000m, 2 miles, 3 miles and 5000m. Moving up to the senior ranks in 1969, Stewart took the European Indoor 3000m title in a UK record (7.55.4), became the British 5000 metres champion after winning the British AAA Championships title at the 1969 AAA Championships and then winning 5000m gold at the 1969 European Athletics Championships in Athens in a time of 13.44.8.

In 1970, Stewart set a European record and world's season best time when he recorded 13:22:8 to win the Commonwealth Games 5,000 metres title. This was one of the greatest races of all time and he defeated current world record holder Ron Clarke, Olympic 1,500 metres champion Kip Keino and fellow Scot, Ian McCafferty. Stewart produced a last lap of 54.4, Keino and Clarke could only finish 3rd and 5th, respectively.

The 1971 campaign proved an anti-climax as illness and injuries halted his progress, he was back to full fitness in the Olympic year of 1972. In the Olympic 5000 metres final, he suffered from a collision with American Steve Prefontaine with 700 metres to go but produced an amazing burst in the home straight to gain the bronze medal (13.27.6), the Finn, Lasse Viren, took gold in 13.26.4. Stewart ran the home straight faster than even Virén. Stewart later blamed the clash with Prefontaine for costing him the gold.

After a disappointing 1973 season and a mediocre effort in the Commonwealth Games 5000m final (5th in 13.40.4) in early 1974, he decided to take up cycle racing to recharge his batteries. Suitably refreshed, he returned to athletics in fine style the following year, completing an excellent double in March 1975 by winning the European indoor 3000m crown (7.58.6) and the IAAF World Cross Country Championships gold medal. He remains Britain's last male winner of the cross country title and it proved to be his last major international honour. Stewart still produced some quality performances in later years, such as his 7th place in the 5000m final at the 1976 Olympics (losing to Virén by 2.89 seconds after dropping from second to seventh place in the last 300 metres. He ran a 10-mile world road best (45.13) in 1977. He retired in summer 1978, bringing down the curtain on a long and illustrious career.

Stewart was ranked No 1 in the world over 5000m by the American magazine Track and Field News in 1970. They ranked him third in 1969 and 1972, fifth in 1975, and tenth in 1976. He sometimes won races by using the unorthodox strategy of "kicking" or breaking far away from the field at the midpoint of the race (instead of on the last lap), leaving his rivals confused as to what to do.

Stewart set other British records: 1,500 metres 3:39.12 (1969), 2,000 metres 5:02.98 (1975),2 miles 8:22.0 (1972). Other personal bests: Mile 3:57.3 (1969) and 10,000 metres 27:43.03 (1977).

Stewart was one of six children, three of whom won European Indoor titles: elder brother Peter (born 1947) was the 3000m champion in Sofia in 1971 and British record holder at the mile 3:55.3 (1972); younger sister Mary (born 1956) won the 1500m in San Sebastian in 1977 and then became the Commonwealth Games champion (for England) in 1978 in Edmonton.

Stewart was awarded the MBE in 1979, and after coaching and working to promote distance running, he succeeded Andy Norman as promotions officer for British Athletics in 1994. Stewart was the Head of Endurance of UK Athletics (UKA) until February 2013.

Sporting positions
Preceded by Dick Taylor	Men's 5000 m Best Year Performance; 1970	Succeeded by Dave Bedford
