= Ahmed Issa =

Chadian middle-distance runner (1943–1983)

- Issa in 1964

Personal information
- Full name: Ahmed Issa
- Nationality: Chadian
- Born: 17 July 1943 Ouham, Ubangi-Shari
- Died: 1983 (aged 39–40)

Sport
- Country: Chad
- Sport: Athletics
Medal record
Men's athletics
Representing Chad
All-Africa Games
Bronze medal – third place	1965 Brazzaville	1500 m

Ahmed Issa (17 July 1943 – 1983) was a Chadian middle-distance runner. Born in Ouham in Ubangi-Shari, he represented Chad in international competition and set a national record in the 800 metres in 1962. He then competed at the 1964 Summer Olympics as part of the first Chadian delegation at an Olympic Games. There, he ran in the men's 800 metres and reached the semifinals.

Footage of him in Tokyo was featured in the 1965 documentary film Tokyo Olympiad. After the 1964 Summer Games, he competed at the 1965 All-Africa Games and set a national record in the 1500 metres, also winning the bronze medal in the event. He also competed at the 1968 Summer Olympics in the men's 800 metres and men's 1500 metres, advancing to the semifinals at the latter.

== Biography ==
Ahmed Issa was born on 17 July 1943 in Ouham in then-Ubangi-Shari (now Central African Republic). Before the 1964 Summer Olympics in Tokyo, Japan, he had set a personal best in the 800 metres with a time of 1:48.6 at Thonon-les-Bains, setting a Chadian national record.

Chad first made an Olympic appearance at the 1964 Summer Olympics, where Issa was part of its delegation. He first competed in the heats of the men's 800 metres against seven other athletes. He had placed second in his heat with a time of 1:49.7, advancing to the semifinals. The semifinals were held the following day and Issa competed against seven other competitors. He ran in a time of 1:49.4 and placed sixth in his round, not qualifying for the finals. He was also entered to compete in the men's 1500 metres though did not start in the event.

While at the 1964 Summer Olympics, he was featured in the 1965 documentary film Tokyo Olympiad directed by Kon Ichikawa. The footage shows his training regimen and him wandering the streets of Tokyo before his elimination in the event. After the Summer Games, he competed at the 1965 All-Africa Games in Brazzaville, Congo. He competed in the men's 1500 metres and ran in a time of 3:47.8 for a new personal best, a Chadian national record, and third place in the event.

Issa then competed at the 1968 Summer Olympics in Mexico City, Mexico. He first competed in the heats of the men's 800 metres on 13 October against six other competitors. He had placed fourth with a time of 1:49.0, not advancing to the semifinals. He then competed in the heats of the men's 1500 metres on 18 October against eleven other competitors. He placed fourth with a time of 3:53.13 and advanced to the semifinals. In the semifinals against twelve other competitors, he ran in a time of 3:53.26 and placed eighth, not advancing to the finals. Issa later died in 1983.
