= Thomas Saisi =

Kenyan middle-distance runner (1945–2021)

Thomas Saisi (19 July 1945 – 30 March 2021) was a Kenyan 800 metres runner who finished seventh at the 1968 Summer Olympics in Mexico City. He also competed at the 1972 Summer Olympics. His personal best time was 1.46.3 minutes, achieved in September 1971 in Munich.
