= Werner Schneiter =

Swiss long-distance runner

Personal information
- Nationality: Swiss
- Born: 24 October 1946 (age 79)

Sport
- Sport: Long-distance running
- Event: 5000 metres

Werner Schneiter (born 24 October 1946) is a Swiss long-distance runner. He competed in the men's 5000 metres at the 1968 Summer Olympics.
