= Bengt Nåjde =

Swedish long-distance runner (1942–2023)

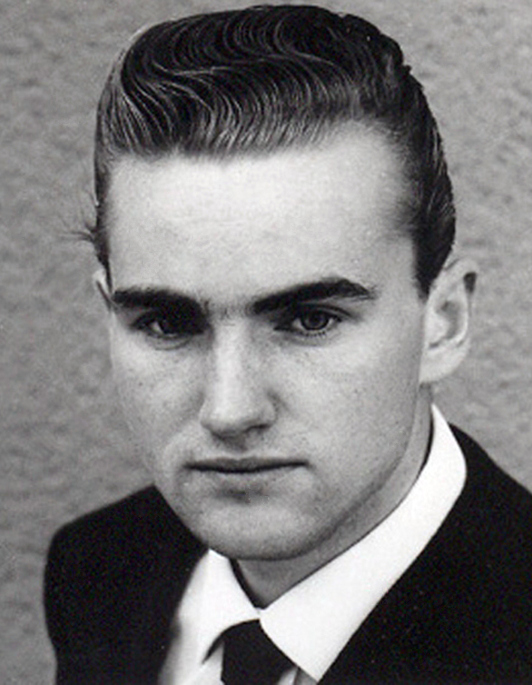

Personal information
- Born: 19 May 1942 Grängesberg, Sweden
- Died: 17 September 2023 (aged 81) Grängesberg, Sweden
- Height: 170 cm (5 ft 7 in)
- Weight: 58 kg (128 lb)

Sport
- Sport: Athletics
- Event: 5,000 m
- Club: Mälarhöjdens IK, Stockholm

Achievements and titles
- Personal best: 13:37.8 (1965)

Bengt Nåjde (born Carlsson; 19 May 1942 – 17 September 2023) was a Swedish long-distance runner. He competed in the 5,000 m at the 1964 Summer Olympics but failed to reach the final. He later placed sixth-eighth in this event at the European championships in 1966 and 1969. Nåjde died in Grängesberg on 17 September 2023, at the age of 81.
