= Yuval Wischnitzer =

Israeli athlete

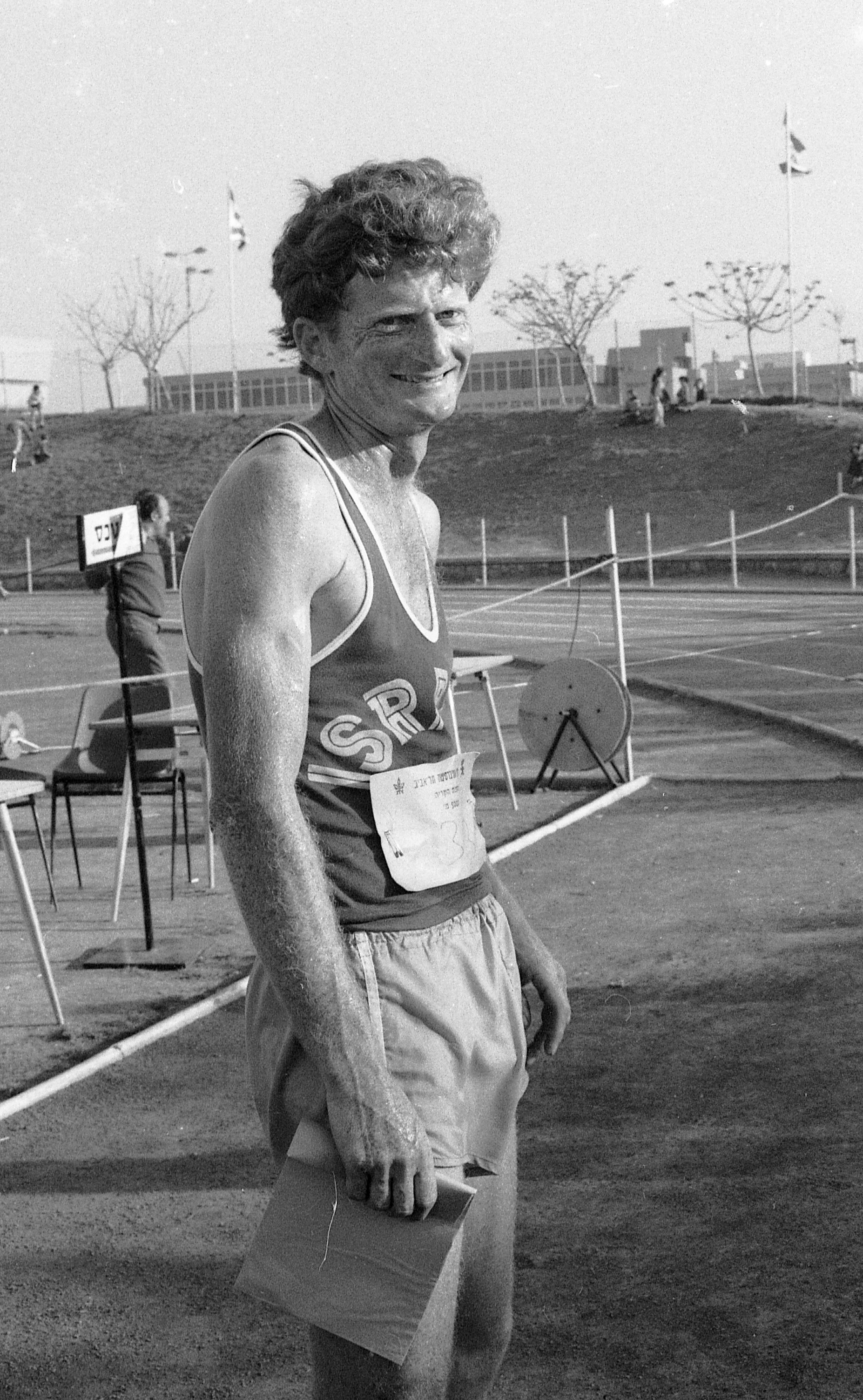
- Yuval Wischnitzer, 1977

Personal information
- Native name: יובל וישניצר
- Nationality: Israeli
- Born: 6 February 1947 (age 79)

Sport
- Country: Israel
- Sport: Athletics
Medal record
Men's athletics
Representing Israel
Asian Games
Silver medal – second place	1974 Teheran	5000 m
Bronze medal – third place	1970 Bangkok	5000 m

Yuval Wischnitzer (Hebrew: יובל וישניצר; born 6 February 1947) is an Israeli athlete. He won silver and bronze medals in 5000 m in the Asian Games.

At the 1973 Maccabiah Games, he won a gold medal in the 5,000 m.
