= Leonid Mykytenko =

Ukrainian long-distance runner (1944–2019)

Personal information
- Full name: Leonid Oleksiyovych Mykytenko
- Nationality: Ukrainian
- Born: 8 February 1944
- Died: 3 March 2019 (aged 75)

Sport
- Sport: Long-distance running
- Event: 5000 metres
Medal record
Men's athletics
Representing Soviet Union
European Championships
Bronze medal – third place	1966 Budapest	10,000 m

Leonid Oleksiyovych Mykytenko (8 February 1944 – 3 March 2019) was a Ukrainian long-distance runner. He competed in the men's 5000 metres at the 1968 Summer Olympics, representing the Soviet Union. His daughter-in-law is Irina Mikitenko and his granddaughter is Vanessa Mikitenko, both representing Germany.
