= Tom Farrell (middle-distance runner) =

American middle-distance runner (born 1944)

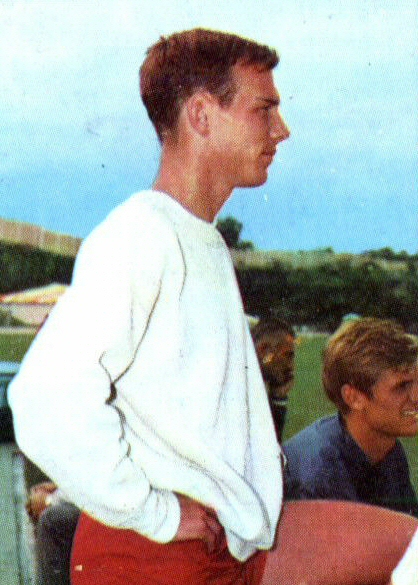
- Farrell in 1969

Personal information
- Full name: Thomas Francis Farrell
- Born: January 18, 1944 (age 82) New York, New York, U.S.
- Height: 5 ft 8 in (1.72 m)
- Weight: 141 lb (64 kg)
Medal record
Men's athletics
Representing United States
Olympic Games
Bronze medal – third place	1968 Mexico City	800 metres

Thomas Francis Farrell (born January 18, 1944) represented the United States of America in two Olympic Games, in the 800 metres race. He placed fifth in Tokyo in 1964 and won the bronze medal in Mexico City in 1968.

He attended Archbishop Molloy High School in Queens, New York. After finishing high school Farrell enrolled at St. John's University in Jamaica, New York, where he was coached by Steve Bartold. At the age of 19 Farrell placed fifth in the 800 metres race in the 1964 Tokyo Olympic Games, behind winner and world record holder Peter Snell.

In 1965 he won the United States National Championship in the 880 yard race and won the British AAA Championships title in the 880 yards event at the 1965 AAA Championships.

He won the 1968 United States Olympic Trials (track and field) at 800 meters.

He competed for the United States in the 1968 Summer Olympics held in Mexico City in the 800 metres where he won the bronze medal.

Farrell lives in Southern California with his wife, Chris. He's still involved in athletics as a volunteer track coach at St. John's University, New York. But due to the distance between California and New York, his coaching activities are now limited.
