= Rex Maddaford =

New Zealand athlete

Personal information
- Full name: Rex Montague Maddaford
- Nationality: New Zealand
- Born: 9 March 1947 (age 79)

Sport
- Sport: Long-distance running
- Event: 5000 metres

Rex Montague Maddaford (born 9 March 1947) is a New Zealand long-distance runner. He competed in the men's 5000 metres at the 1968 Summer Olympics.

Maddaford ran collegiately for Eastern New Mexico University in Portales, New Mexico, winning the 1970 NAIA Men's Cross Country Championship individual title, among other accomplishments. Maddaford was inducted into the Eastern New Mexico University Hall of Fame in 1984.
