= Wohib Masresha =

Ethiopian long-distance runner

Personal information
- Nationality: Ethiopian
- Born: 19 April 1946 (age 80)

Sport
- Sport: Long-distance running
- Event: 5000 metres

Wohib Masresha (born 19 April 1946) is an Ethiopian long-distance runner. He competed in the men's 5000 metres at the 1968 Summer Olympics.
