= Evan Maguire =

New Zealand long-distance runner

Personal information
- Full name: Evan George Maguire
- Nationality: New Zealand
- Born: 26 May 1942 (age 84)

Sport
- Sport: Long-distance running
- Event: 10,000 metres

Evan George Maguire (born 26 May 1942) is a New Zealand long-distance runner. He competed in the men's 10,000 metres at the 1968 Summer Olympics.
