= Ove Berg =

Swedish middle-distance runner

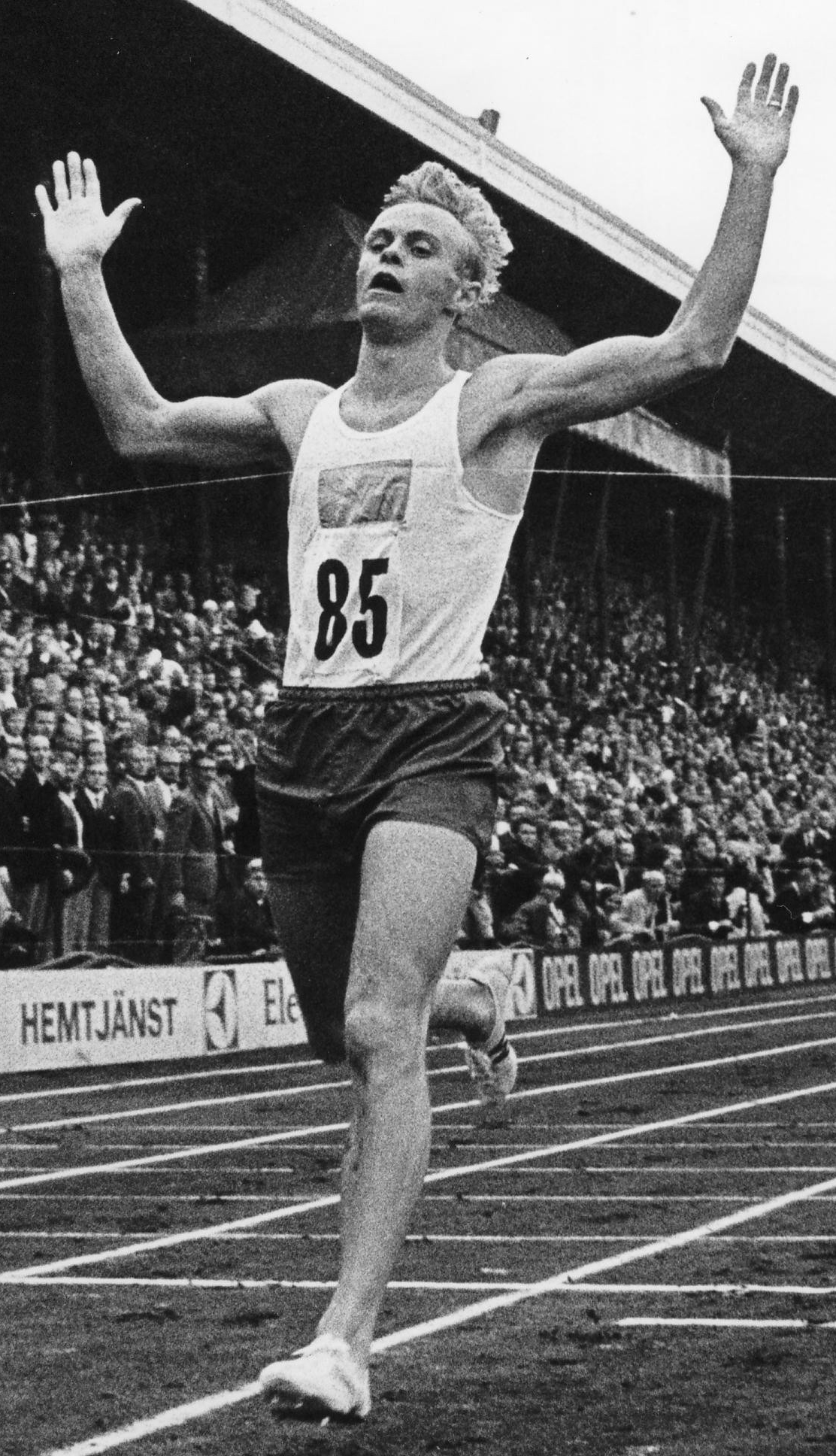
- Ove Berg in 1967

Personal information
- Born: 27 May 1944 (age 82) Alfta, Sweden
- Height: 1.70 m (5 ft 7 in)
- Weight: 63 kg (139 lb)

Sport
- Sport: Athletics
- Event(s): 800 m, 1500 m
- Club: Alfta GoIF; Hofors AIF

Achievements and titles
- Personal best(s): 800 m – 1:47.9; 1500 m – 3:41.1 (1968)

Ove Kjell Berg (born 27 May 1944) is a retired Swedish middle-distance runner. He competed in the 1500 m event at the 1968 Summer Olympics, but failed to reach the final. Berg won the national 800 m title in 1968 and 1969.
