= Mamo Sebsibe =

Ethiopian middle-distance runner

Personal information
- Nationality: Ethiopian
- Born: 24 September 1944 (age 81)

Sport
- Sport: Middle-distance running
- Event: 800 metres

Mamo Sebsibe (born 24 September 1944) is an Ethiopian former middle-distance runner who competed at the 1964 and 1968 Summer Olympics.

Mamo competed for the Colby Mules track and field team in the NCAA.
