= Suleman Ambaye =

Ethiopian cyclist (born 1935)

Personal information
- Born: 11 September 1935 (age 91)

Cycling career
- Sport: Cycling

Suleman Ambaye (born 11 September 1935) is a former Ethiopian cyclist. He competed in the individual road race and team time trial events at the 1964 Summer Olympics.
