= Rashid Sharafetdinov =

Russian long-distance runner

Personal information
- Born: 10 July 1943 Samara, Soviet Union
- Died: 21 November 2012 (aged 69) St. Petersburg, Russia

Sport
- Sport: Track and field
Medal record
Representing Soviet Union
European Championships
Silver medal – second place	1969 Athens	5000 m
Bronze medal – third place	1971 Helsinki	10,000 m
European Indoor Championships
Silver medal – second place	1967 Prague	3000m
Summer Universiade
Gold medal – first place	1970 Turin	10,000m

Rashid Imamovich Sharafetdinov (Russian: Рашид Имамович Шарафетдинов; 10 July 1943 – 21 November 2012) was a Russian long-distance runner who competed in the 1968 Summer Olympics and in the 1972 Summer Olympics.
