= Tekeste Woldu =

Eritrean cyclist

Personal information
- Born: 13 May 1947 (age 79) Asmara, Eritrea

Cycling career
- Sport: Cycling

Tekeste Woldu (Jegante) (born 5 May 1945) is an Eritrean former cyclist. He competed at the 1968 Summer Olympics and the 1972 Summer Olympics representing Ethiopia.
