= Esau Adenji =

Cameroonian long-distance runner

Personal information
- Nationality: Cameroonian
- Born: 11 January 1944 (age 81) Kumba, Cameroon

Sport
- Sport: Long-distance running
- Event: 5000 metres

Esau Adenji (born 11 January 1944) is a Cameroonian long-distance runner. He competed in the 5000 metres at the 1968 Summer Olympics and the 1972 Summer Olympics.
