= Matias Habtemichael =

Ethiopian middle-distance runner

Personal information
- Nationality: Ethiopian
- Born: 14 November 1950 (age 75) Addis Ababa, Ethiopia

Sport
- Sport: Middle-distance running
- Event: 800 metres

Matias Habtemichael (born 14 November 1950) is an Ethiopian middle-distance runner. He competed in the men's 800 metres at the 1968 Summer Olympics.

At the Olympics, he advanced to the semifinals, running 1:49.2.

In June 1970, Michael finished fifth at the NCAA Division I Track Championships in the 880-yard finals, earning a Cal Poly school-record time of 1:47.9.
