= Jürgen Haase =

East German track and field athlete

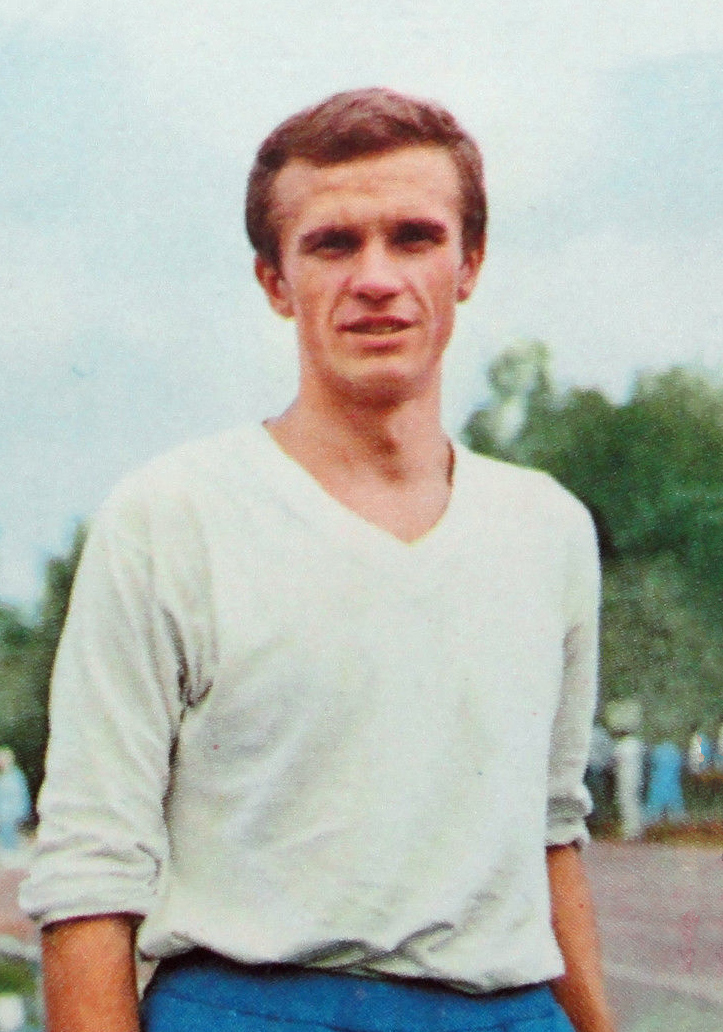

Personal information
- Born: 19 January 1945 (age 81) Friedersdorf, Germany
- Height: 1.78 m (5 ft 10 in)
- Weight: 60 kg (132 lb)

Sport
- Sport: Athletics
- Event: 10,000 m
- Club: SC Leipzig
- Coached by: Günter Büttner

Achievements and titles
- Personal best: 10000 m – 27:53.36 (1971)
Medal record
Men's athletics
Representing East Germany
European Championships
Gold medal – first place	1966 Budapest	10,000 m
Gold medal – first place	1969 Athens	10,000 m
Silver medal – second place	1971 Helsinki	10,000 m

Jürgen Haase (born 19 January 1945) is a former track and field athlete and Olympian, who, competing for East Germany, was among the world's best long-distance track runners in the 1960s and 1970s. Twice during this period, in 1966 and 1969, he was European champion in the 10,000 meters.

== Biography ==
Haase trained with methods developed by Arthur Lydiard, the New Zealand trainer who was, at the time, still relatively unknown in Europe and was the surprise winner of the 1965 GDR 10,000 metres.

At the European Championships in 1966, his teammate Jürgen May convinced him, with the help of a $500 bribe, not to wear his usual Adidas shoes but rather to wear Puma. This episode became something of a political scandal, in the course of which Haase was pardoned by the GDR Sports authorities. May, on the other hand, was permanently banned from the GDR national team.

Haase won the British AAA Championships title in the 6 miles event at the 1967 AAA Championships.

Haase missed the 1972 Summer Olympics due to blood poisoning that he received after being injured by the spike of another runner at a competition in Paris.

After retiring from competitions in 1973, Haase was active in customer service and marketing of medical technology. He then graduated from the Deutsche Hochschule für Körperkultur und Sport (German College for Fitness Training and Sport) and became a coach at SC Dynamo Berlin. His trainees included Kathrin Weßel (bronze medalist in 10,000 m at the 1987 World Championships) and Detlef Wagenknecht (World Cup medalist in 800 m in 1981 and 1983). After the reunification of Germany, Haase worked at the Deutschen Leichtathletik-Verbandes (German Track Federation).

== International races ==
- 1964, European Junior Championships: 1st place: 1500 m (3:52.4); 1st place: 3000 m (8:25.4)
- 1966, European Championships: 1st place: 10,000 m (28:26.0); 11th place: 5000 m (13:55.6 )
- 1967, European Cup: 1st place: 10,000 m (28:54.2); 2nd place: 5000 m (15:27.8)
- 1968, Olympic Games: 15th place: 10,000 m (30:24.0)
- 1969, European Championships: 1st place: 10,000 m (28:41.6)
- 1970, European Cup: 1st place: 10,000 m (28:26.8)
- 1971, European Championships: 2nd place: 10,000 m (27:53.4)

== East German championships ==
- 10,000 m: 1st place – 1965, 1966, 1968, 1970, 1972 and 1973
- 5000 m: 1st place – 1969, 2nd place – 1973
- Cross-country running 12 km: 2nd place – 1966, 1st place – 1967, 1968, 1969 and 1972
- 3000 m indoor: 2nd place – 1965 and 1966, 3rd place – 1970

== Records ==
- 10,000 m
  - East German record: 28:12.6, 25 May 1966, Leipzig
  - European record: 28:04.4, 21 July 1968, Leningrad
  - East German record: 27:53.36, 10 August 1971, Helsinki
- 15 km road run
  - GDR record: 43:45.2, 21 April 1974, Sachsenhausen (Current German Record as of November 2015)
- 20 km road run
  - GDR record: 58:56, 1973
- One hour run
  - GDR record: 20,393 Meters, 6 May 1973, Dresden
