= Rudi Simon =

Belgian middle-distance runner

Personal information
- Nationality: Belgian
- Born: 23 March 1946 (age 80)

Sport
- Sport: Middle-distance running
- Event: 1500 metres

Rudi Simon (born 23 March 1946) is a Belgian middle-distance runner. He competed in the men's 1500 metres at the 1968 Summer Olympics.
