= Nikolay Sviridov =

Soviet long-distance runner (1938–2023)

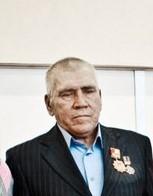
- Sviridov in 2016

Personal information
- Nationality: Soviet
- Born: 6 July 1938 Staraya Veduga, Semiluksky District, Voronezh Oblast, Russian SFSR, USSR
- Died: 14 June 2023 (aged 84) Voronezh, Russia

Sport
- Sport: Long-distance running
- Event: 5000 metres
Medal record
Men's athletics
Representing Soviet Union
European Championships
Bronze medal – third place	1969 Athens	10,000 m

Nikolay Ivanovich Sviridov (Russian: Николай Иванович Свиридов; 6 July 1938 – 14 June 2023) was a Soviet long-distance runner. He competed in the 5000 metres at the 1968 Summer Olympics and the 1972 Summer Olympics.

Sviridov died on 14 June 2023, at the age of 84.
