= Clovis Morales =

Honduran long-distance runner

Personal information
- Born: 27 February 1949 (age 77) Tegucigalpa, Honduras

Sport
- Sport: Track and field
Medal record
Representing Honduras
Central American Games
Silver medal – second place	1973 Guatemala City	Marathon

Clovis Morales Chávez (born 27 February 1949) is a Honduran long-distance runner. He is most known for setting Honduran records in the 3000m, 10000m and the marathon. He competed in the men's 5000 metres at the 1968 Summer Olympics.

== International competitions ==
Year	Competition	Venue	Position	Event	Notes
Representing Honduras
1968	Olympic Games	Mexico City, Mexico	37th (h)	5000 m	18:40.2
1971	Central American Championships	San José, Costa Rica	2nd	Half Marathon	1:13:17.8
1972	Central American Championships	Panama City, Panama	2nd	5000 m	15:22.5
1973	Universiade	Moscow, Soviet Union	28th (h)	1500 m	4:17.6
1973	Universiade	Moscow, Soviet Union	26th (h)	5000 m	15:32.2
1973	Central American Games	Guatemala City, Guatemala	2nd	Marathon	2:34:39.7
1974	Central American and Caribbean Games	Santo Domingo, Dominican Republic	11th	10,000 m	31:55.0
1974	Central American and Caribbean Games	Santo Domingo, Dominican Republic	7th	Marathon	2:40:00

== See also ==
- List of Honduran records in athletics
