= Mikael Saglimbeni =

Ethiopian cyclist

Personal information
- Born: 22 November 1940 (age 85) Asmara, Ethiopia

Cycling career
- Sport: Cycling

Mikael Saglimbeni (born 22 November 1940) is an Ethiopian former cyclist. He competed at the 1964 Summer Olympics and the 1968 Summer Olympics.
