= Fisihasion Ghebreyesus =

Ethiopian cyclist (born 1941)

Personal information
- Born: 27 February 1941 (age 85) Asmara, Ethiopia

Cycling career
- Sport: Cycling

Fisihasion Ghebreyesus (born 27 February 1941) is an Ethiopian former cyclist. He competed at the 1964, 1968 and 1972 Summer Olympics.
