= János Szerényi =

Hungarian long-distance runner (1938–2024)

Personal information
- Nationality: Hungarian
- Born: 21 August 1938 Baja, Hungary
- Died: December 2024 (aged 86)

Sport
- Sport: Long-distance running
- Event: 10,000 metres

János Szerényi (21 August 1938 – December 2024) was a Hungarian long-distance runner. He competed in the men's 10,000 metres at the 1968 Summer Olympics. He died in December 2024 at the age of 86.
