= Hansrüedi Knill =

Swiss middle-distance runner (born 1940)

Personal information
- Nationality: Swiss
- Born: 21 May 1940 (age 85)

Sport
- Sport: Middle-distance running
- Event: 1500 metres

Hansrüedi Knill (born 21 May 1940) is a Swiss middle-distance runner. He competed in the 1500 metres at the 1964 Summer Olympics and the 1968 Summer Olympics.
