= Bernd Dießner =

German distance runner

Medal record

Men's athletics

Representing East Germany

European Championships
Bronze medal – third place	1966 Budapest	5000 m

Bernd Dießner (born 16 March 1946 in Aken, Saxony-Anhalt) is a retired East German long-distance runner who specialized in the 5000 metres.

He won the silver medal at the 1968 European Indoor Games (in 3000 metres), the bronze medal at the 1966 European Championships, finished fourth at the 1969 European Championships, and fourteenth at the 1971 European Championships. He also competed at the 1968 Olympic Games.

Dießner represented the sports clubs Vorwärts Berlin and ASK Vorwärts Potsdam and became East German champion in 1968 and 1971. His most prominent personal best times were 7:49.4 in the 3000 metres, achieved in June 1970 in Potsdam, and 13:31.2 in the 5000 metres, achieved in June 1972 in East Berlin. He also had 3:39.8 in the 1500 metres, achieved in May 1969 in Potsdam, and 28:24.6 in the 10,000 metres, achieved in April 1972 in Potsdam.

After retiring he has worked as a coach in the sports club LAC Erdgas Chemnitz, for André Pollmächer among others. He has also coached Ulrike Bruns (for a very brief period of time), Jens-Peter Herold, Jürgen Straub and Olaf Beyer.
