= Grand Atatürk Run =

Annual road running event in Ankara, Turkey

- Date: December 27
- Location: Ankara, Turkey
- Event type: Road
- Distance: 10K
- Primary sponsor: Turkish Athletic Federation
- Established: 1936
- Course records: 29:10 men's 2013; 32:19 women's 2002
- Website: Grand Atatürk Run

The Grand Atatürk Run (Turkish: Büyük Atatürk Koşusu) is an annual road running event of 10K run, which takes place on 27 December in Ankara, Turkey. The date coincides with the first visit of Mustafa Kemal Atatürk, founder of the Turkish Republic, to Ankara. The competition has been held every year since 1936. It is organised under the auspices of Turkish Athletic Federation (Turkish: Türkiye Atletizm Federasyonu).

The race distance is roughly (10.8 km (6.7 mi), though it is not a certifiably measured course. Historically, the race has ranged from 10 to 12 km (6.2 to 7.5 mi) in length. The course is set in the centre of the city, starting at Dikmen Valley Park and finishing at the front of Ankara Central Station. Initially an event for men only, a women's section was introduced in 1992, and races for both genders are now held annually. It is one of the longest running road race events in Europe.

Past winners of the race include many of the country's top distance runners. In the men's race, winners include European medallist Halil Akkaş and Mediterranean Games champions Ekrem Koçak and Mehmet Terzi. Double Olympic silver medallist Elvan Abeylegesse and Binnaz Uslu (runner-up at the European Cross Country Championships) have won on the women's side. Şükrü Saban is the most successful athlete in the history of the competition, having won eight times between 1960 and 1970. The fastest times recorded for the race are 29:26 minutes for men (set by Zeki Öztürk in 1996) and 32:19 minutes for women (set by Elvan Abeylegesse in 2002).

== Past winners ==
Key: Course record

Year	Men's winner	Sports club	Women's winner	Sports club
1936	Galip Darılmaz	Ankara Demirspor	Not held	
1937	Şevki Koru	Ankaragücü	Not held	
1938	Mustafa Kaplan	Ankara Demirspor	Not held	
1939	Adnan Darılmaz	Ankara Demirspor	Not held	
1940	Mustafa Kaplan	Ankara Demirspor	Not held	
1941	Eşref Aydın	Fenerbahçe	Not held	
1942	Zürref Aşılmazsoy	Eskişehirspor	Not held	
1943	Mustafa Kaplan	Ankara Demirspor	Not held	
1944	Eşref Aydın	Fenerbahçe	Not held	
1945	Mustafa Özcan	Gençlerbirliği	Not held	
1946	Mustafa Kaplan	Ankara Demirspor	Not held	
1947	Mustafa Özcan	Gençlerbirliği	Not held	
1948	Osman Coşgül	Jandarmagücü	Not held	
1949	Osman Coşgül	Jandarmagücü	Not held	
1950	Mustafa Özcan	Gençlerbirliği	Not held	
1951	Osman Coşgül	Fenerbahçe	Not held	
1952	Cahit Önel	Galatasaray	Not held	
1953	Abdullah Kökpınar	Karagücü	Not held	
1954	Ekrem Koçak	Fenerbahçe	Not held	
1955	Hüseyin Topsakal	Hacettepe	Not held	
1956	Ekrem Koçak	Fenerbahçe	Not held	
1957	Ekrem Koçak	Fenerbahçe	Not held	
1958	Muharrem Dalkılıç	Jandarmagücü	Not held	
1959	Muharrem Dalkılıç	Jandarmagücü	Not held	
1960	Şükrü Saban	Fenerbahçe	Not held	
1961	Şükrü Saban	Fenerbahçe	Not held	
1962	Muharrem Dalkılıç	Fenerbahçe	Not held	
1963	Şükrü Saban	Eskişehirspor	Not held	
1964	Muharrem Dalkılıç	Fenerbahçe	Not held	
1965	Şükrü Saban	Eskişehirspor	Not held	
1966	Şükrü Saban	Eskişehirspor	Not held	
1967	Şükrü Saban	Eskişehirspor	Not held	
1968	Muharrem Dalkılıç	Fenerbahçe	Not held	
1969	Şükrü Saban	Eskişehirspor	Not held	
1970	Şükrü Saban	Eskişehirspor	Not held	
1971	Hamza Canavar	Denizlispor	Not held	
1972	Hikmet Şen	Fenerbahçe	Not held	
1973	Hikmet Şen	Fenerbahçe	Not held	
1974	Musa Kalemoğlu	Ankara Emniyet	Not held	
1975	Mehmet Yurdadön	Kars	Not held	
1976	Sıddık Dursun	Ağrıspor	Not held	
1977	Mehmet Yurdadön	Yenişehirspor	Not held	
1978	Mehmet Yurdadön	Yenişehirspor	Not held	
1979	Mehmet Yurdadön	Yenişehirspor	Not held	
1980	Mehmet Yurdadön	Yenişehirspor	Not held	
1981	Mehmet Yurdadön	Yenişehirspor	Not held	
1982	Mehmet Yurdadön	Yenişehirspor	Not held	
1983	Mehmet Yurdadön	Fenerbahçe	Not held	
1984	Mehmet Terzi	Fenerbahçe	Not held	
1985	Mehmet Terzi	Fenerbahçe	Not held	
1986	Zeki Öztürk	Şişecam Paşabahçe	Not held	
1987	Zeki Öztürk	Şişecam Paşabahçe	Not held	
1988	Zeki Öztürk	Şişecam Paşabahçe	Not held	
1989	Nihat Yaylalı	Şişecam Paşabahçe	Not held	
1990	Zeki Öztürk	Şişecam Paşabahçe	Not held	
1991	Nihat Yaylalı	Şişecam Paşabahçe	Not held	
1992	Zeki Öztürk	Sincan Belediyesi	Lale Öztürk	Yenimahalle
1993	Nihat Yaylalı	Fenerbahçe	Lale Öztürk	Yenimahalle
1994	Nihat Yaylalı	Fenerbahçe	Serap Aktaş	Güneş Sigorta
1995	Fatih Çintımar	Erzurum TT	Lale Öztürk	Yenimahalle
1996	Zeki Öztürk	İstanbul BB	Serap Aktaş	Fenerbahçe
1997	Metin Sazak	Fenerbahçe	Lale Öztürk	Yenimahalle
1998	Metin Sazak	Fenerbahçe	Nuray Sürekli	Fenerbahçe
1999	Abdülkadir Türk	Fenerbahçe	Ebru Kavaklıoğlu	Fenerbahçe
2000	Abdülkadir Türk	Gebze Belediyespor	Nuray Sürekli	Fenerbahçe
2001	Abdülkadir Türk	Gebze Belediyespor	Elvan Abeylegesse	Enkaspor
2002	Sergey Ivanov	Russia	Elvan Abeylegesse	Enkaspor
2003	Sergey Ivanov	Russia	Galina Yemelyanova	Russia
2004	Halil Akkaş	Enkaspor	Nuray Sürekli	Fenerbahçe
2005	Halil Akkaş	Enkaspor	Binnaz Uslu	Enkaspor
2006	Halil Akkaş	Fenerbahçe	Binnaz Uslu	Enkaspor
2007	Abdülkadir Türk	Fenerbahçe	Emebet Bacha	Ethiopia
2008	Kemal Koyuncu	Kocaeli	Türkan Erişmiş	Üsküdar
2009	Mehmet Çağlayan	Kocaeli	Sultan Haydar	Enkaspor
2010	Murat Ertaş	Kocaeli	Binnaz Uslu	Enkaspor
2011	Mert Girmalegesse	Fenerbahçe	Binnaz Uslu	Enkaspor
2012	Ali Haydar Tekgöz	Istanbul B.B.	Türkan Özata	Beşiktaş
2013	Mehmet Çağlayan	Aksaray Belediye SK	Tsehynesh Tsenga	Azerbaijan
2014	Wendmageng Egiso	Ethiopia	Sabahat Akpınar	Bursa B.Ş.
2015	Mehmet Çağlayan	Turkey	Türkan Erişmiş	Turkey
2016	Fetene Regasa	Ethiopia	Elif Dağdelen	Turkey
2017	Bernard Sang	Kenya	Elif Dağdelen	Turkey
2018	Ramazan Baştuğ	Turkey	Sebahat Akpınar	Turkey
2019	Getaneh Gelaw	Ethiopia	Semra Karaaslan	Turkey
2022	Cihat Ulus	Turkey	Burcu Subatan	Turkey

== Most wins ==
Men's

Wins	Name	Years
8	Şükrü Saban	1960, 1961, 1963, 1965, 1966, 1967, 1969, 1970
8	Mehmet Yurdadön	1975, 1977, 1978, 1979, 1980, 1981, 1982, 1983
6	Zeki Öztürk	1986, 1987, 1988, 1990, 1992, 1996
5	Muharrem Dalkılıç	1956, 1959, 1962, 1964, 1968
4	Mustafa Kaplan	1938, 1940, 1943, 1946
4	Abdülkadir Türk	1999, 2000, 2001, 2007
4	Nihat Yaylalı	1989, 1991, 1993, 1994
3	Halil Akkaş	2004, 2005, 2006
3	Osman Coşgül	1948, 1949, 1951
3	Ekrem Koçak	1954, 1956, 1957
3	Mustafa Özcan	1945, 1947, 1950
2	Eşref Aydın	1941, 1944
2	Sergey Ivanov	2002, 2003
2	Metin Sazak	1997, 1998
2	Hikmet Şen	1972, 1973
2	Mehmet Terzi	1984, 1985

Women's

Wins	Name	Years
4	Lale Öztürk	1992, 1993, 1995, 1997
4	Binnaz Uslu	2005, 2006, 2010, 2011
3	Nuray Sürekli	1998, 2000, 2004
2	Elvan Abeylegesse	2001, 2002
2	Serap Aktaş	1994, 1996
2	Türkan Erişmiş Özata	2008, 2012
