= 1971 European Athletics Championships – Men's 5000 metres =

Men's 5000 metres at the European Athletics Championships

The men's 5000 metres at the 1971 European Athletics Championships was held in Helsinki, Finland, at Helsinki Olympic Stadium on 12 and 14 August 1971.

== Medalists ==
Gold	Juha Väätäinen; Finland
Silver	Jean Wadoux; France
Bronze	Harald Norpoth; West Germany

== Results ==
=== Final ===
14 August Contrary to the 10,000-metre race of these European Athletics Championships, the 5,000-metre final was run at a slow pace for most of its laps. Early during the final, the Soviet Union's Vladimir Afonin was pushed by one or more other runners, fell down, and dropped out of the race. Finland's Juha Väätäinen, who was a strong pre-race favourite, given his explosive kick in the 10,000-metre race, kept observing the situation without taking the lead before the final lap. So did the two other pre-race favourites, France's Jean Wadoux and West Germany's Harald Norpoth. Although Wadoux was several seconds faster than Väätäinen in 1,500 metres, for some strange reason the Frenchman did not try to break away from the Finn before the final lap. Neither did Norpoth, who was also a fast 1,500-metre runner, having placed fourth in that distance at the 1968 Mexico City Summer Olympics. At the start of the final lap, there were still at least eight or nine runners in the lead group. Finland's young Lasse Viren tried to sprint into the lead, but he was pushed so hard by some other runners that he nearly lost his balance for a few seconds. With about 300 metres left, Väätäinen unleashed his furious kick, and only Wadoux and Norpoth were able to follow him. On the final bend, Väätäinen began to pull away from Wadoux and Norpoth, and stretched his lead further on the home straight. For some seconds, it looked as if also Norpoth would pass Wadoux, but then the French runner was able to accelerate enough to leave the West German runner with the bronze medal. As a result of Väätäinen's double European titles in the long-distance races, a new enthusiasm for the long-distance running began in Finland. (Väätäinen & Eeli Aalto, One More Lap / Kierros vielä (Finland, 1972); Raevuori, Antero, Lasse Viren: The Gilded Spikes / Kullatut piikkarit (Finland, c. 1976); Wunsche, Wolfgang, The Heroes of the Race Tracks (the Finnish edition, c. 1984); https://www.youtube.com/watch?v=8nE-TxH2DdQ EUROPEI DI HELSINKI 1971 5000 VAATAINEN.)

Rank	Name	Nationality	Time	Notes
1st place, gold medalist(s)	Juha Väätäinen	Finland	13:32.48	CR NR
2nd place, silver medalist(s)	Jean Wadoux	France	13:33.56	
3rd place, bronze medalist(s)	Harald Norpoth	West Germany	13:33.79	
4	Danijel Korica	Yugoslavia	13:34.88	
5	Javier Álvarez	Spain	13:35.84	
6	Emiel Puttemans	Belgium	13:36.60	
7	Lasse Virén	Finland	13:38.46	
8	Bronisław Malinowski	Poland	13:39.33	NR
9	Frank Eisenberg	East Germany	13:41.07	
10	Petras Simonelis	Soviet Union	13:42.78	
11	Mike Baxter	Great Britain	13:43.16	
12	Rune Holmén	Finland	13:46.50	
13	Allan Rushmer	Great Britain	13:48.19	
14	Bernd Dießner	East Germany	13:50.79	
	Vladimir Afonin	Soviet Union	DNF	

=== Heats ===
12 August

==== Heat 1 ====
Rank	Name	Nationality	Time	Notes
1	Jean Wadoux	France	13:44.2	Q
2	Javier Alvarez	Spain	13:44.4	Q
3	Harald Norpoth	West Germany	13:45.6	Q
4	Mike Baxter	Great Britain	13:45.6	Q
5	Rune Holmén	Finland	13:46.4	Q
6	Jos Hermens	Netherlands	13:47.2	NR
7	Muharrem Dalkılıç	Turkey	14:39.0	

==== Heat 2 ====
Rank	Name	Nationality	Time	Notes
1	Juha Väätäinen	Finland	13:47.6	Q
2	Bernd Dießner	East Germany	13:49.8	Q
3	Bronisław Malinowski	Poland	13:50.0	Q
4	Danijel Korica	Yugoslavia	13:52.8	Q
5	Petras Simonelis	Soviet Union	13:54.4	Q
6	Alan Blinston	Great Britain	14:01.2	
7	Egbert Nijstadt	Netherlands	14:05.2	
8	Wolfgang Falke	West Germany	14:05.6	
9	Giuseppe Ardizzone	Italy	14:06.6	
10	Jean-Yves Le Flohic	France	14:10.2	
11	Donald Walsh	Ireland	14:12.6	

==== Heat 3 ====
Rank	Name	Nationality	Time	Notes
1	Emiel Puttemans	Belgium	13:50.4	Q
2	Frank Eisenberg	East Germany	13:52.4	Q
3	Allan Rushmer	Great Britain	13:52.6	Q
4	Lasse Virén	Finland	13:53.2	Q
5	Vladimir Afonin	Soviet Union	13:53.6	Q
6	Giuseppe Cindolo	Italy	13:54.8	
7	Werner Girke	West Germany	13:56.0	
8	Stanislav Hoffman	Czechoslovakia	13:58.6	
9	Michel Bernard	France	14:02.2	
	Arne Kvalheim	Norway	DNF	

== Participation ==
According to an unofficial count, 28 athletes from 16 countries participated in the event.

- Belgium (1)
- Czechoslovakia (1)
- East Germany (2)
- Finland (3)
- France (3)
- Ireland (1)
- Italy (2)
- Netherlands (2)
- Norway (1)
- Poland (1)
- Soviet Union (2)
- Spain (1)
- Turkey (1)
- Great Britain (3)
- West Germany (3)
- Yugoslavia (1)
