= Viren =

Viren may refer to:

== Given name ==
- Viren Dangwal (1947–2015), Indian poet, academic, and journalist
- Viren Kapadia (born 1967), Indian-American businessman, president and CEO of Gyrus Systems
- Viren Rasquinha (born 1980), Indian field hockey player, captain of the Indian national team
- Viren J. Shah (1926–2013), Indian politician and businessman

== Surname ==
- Anssi Viren (born 1977), Finnish football coach and former player
- Dag Viren or Dag Wirén (1905–1986), Swedish composer
- Lasse Virén (born 1949), Finnish long-distance runner and Olympic gold-medallist
- Robert Viren (1857–1917), Baltic German career naval officer in the Imperial Russian Navy
- Sarah Viren, American essayist

== See also ==
- Lasse Viren Finnish Invitational, annual 20-kilometre running race near Malibu, California
- Lord Viren, fictional character from The Dragon Prince
