= Athletics at the 1972 Summer Olympics – Men's 5000 metres =

Men's 5000 metres at the Games of the XX Olympiad
- Venue: Olympic Stadium
- Dates: September 10, 1972
- Competitors: 61 from 35 nations
- Winning time: 13:26.4 OR

Medalists
1st place, gold medalist(s)		Lasse Virén; Finland
2nd place, silver medalist(s)		Mohamed Gammoudi; Tunisia
3rd place, bronze medalist(s)		Ian Stewart; Great Britain

The Men's 5000 metres at the 1972 Summer Olympics in Munich, West Germany took place on 7 and 10 September 1972.

Having won the 10,000 metres a week earlier, Lasse Virén controlled the pace through the first 2000 metres in 5:32.61. David Bedford, tired of the slow pace, passing Viren and leading a crowd to go around to a faster pace. As the pace accelerated, Javier Álvarez came from the rear around the field to take the point for the next kilometre. At 3200 metres, Nikolay Sviridov challenged for the lead.

Steve Prefontaine took the lead at 3400 metres. Over the next lap, Viren came from sixth place in line to mark Prefontaine. Viren was in turn marked by Emiel Puttemans. A five-man breakaway formed. With 850 metres to go, Viren passed Prefontaine. Down the back stretch, Prefontaine strained back into the lead. 50 metres before the bell, Viren took the lead again, with Mohammed Gammoudi breaking off the remaining group to mark the leaders.

Down the final backstretch, Gammoudi eased around Viren while Prefontaine hit almost a full sprint to get on Gammoudi's shoulder. With 200 to go, Prefontaine relaxed and Viren moved ahead of him. Prefontaine surged again to keep pace. In the middle of the final turn, Virén changed gears into his full sprint, taking the lead. Gammoudi couldn't keep pace and began to watch Prefontaine while trying to hold on to the silver medal. Mid-straightaway all three checked the position of their rivals as Prefontaine took one more surge after Gammoudi. As it was quickly clear he couldn't make enough progress, Prefontaine strained. Ian Stewart came from the chasing group in full sprint gaining rapidly. As Stewart caught him from behind, Prefontaine fell apart, struggling the final steps.

Virén successfully defended both titles in 1976.

== Results ==
=== Heats ===
Qualification rule: First 2 in each heat (Q) and the next 4 fastest (q) advance to the Final.

Rank	Heat	Name	Nationality	Time	Notes
1	2	Emiel Puttemans	Belgium	13:31.8	Q
2	2	Steve Prefontaine	United States	13:32.6	Q
3	4	Juha Väätäinen	Finland	13:32.8	Q
4	4	Ian Stewart	Great Britain	13:33.0	Q
5	2	Harald Norpoth	West Germany	13:33.4	q
6	4	Mariano Haro	Spain	13:35.4	q
7	2	Javier Álvarez	Spain	13:36.6	q
8	3	Ian McCafferty	Great Britain	13:38.2	Q
9	3	Frank Eisenberg	East Germany	13:38.4	Q
9	5	Lasse Virén	Finland	13:38.4	Q
9	5	Nikolay Sviridov	Soviet Union	13:38.4	Q
12	3	Per Halle	Norway	13:38.6	q
13	5	Josef Jánský	Czechoslovakia	13:39.8	
14	3	Dušan Moravčík	Czechoslovakia	13:40.4	
15	5	George Young	United States	13:41.2	
16	3	Paul Mose	Kenya	13:41.4	
17	3	Tapio Kantanen	Finland	13:42.0	
18	3	Tony Benson	Australia	13:42.8	
19	5	Edmundo Warnke	Chile	13:43.6	
20	2	Grant McLaren	Canada	13:43.8	
21	5	Bob Finlay	Canada	13:44.0	
22	5	Keisuke Sawaki	Japan	13:44.8	
23	3	Boualem Rahoui	Algeria	13:45.0	
24	2	Pedro Miranda	Mexico	13:45.2	
25	4	Tolossa Kotu	Ethiopia	13:46.2	
26	5	Bronisław Malinowski	Poland	13:48.2	
27	1	Mohamed Gammoudi	Tunisia	13:49.8	Q
28	1	David Bedford	Great Britain	13:49.8	Q
29	3	Tekle Fitinsa	Ethiopia	13:50.4	
30	4	Willy Polleunis	Belgium	13:52.6	
31	3	Dick Tayler	New Zealand	13:56.2	
32	1	Ben Jipcho	Kenya	13:56.8	
33	1	Anders Gärderud	Sweden	13:57.2	
34	4	Nikolay Puklakov	Soviet Union	13:57.6	
35	1	Michael Keogh	Ireland	13:57.8	
36	1	René Goris	Belgium	13:57.8	
37	4	Mario Pérez	Mexico	13:58.2	
38	3	Edward Sequeira	India	14:01.4	
39	1	Arne Risa	Norway	14:01.6	
40	5	Jürgen May	West Germany	14:06.6	
41	4	Leonard Hilton	United States	14:07.2	
42	2	Vladimir Afonin	Soviet Union	14:08.6	
43	5	Gavin Thorley	New Zealand	14:11.6	
44	1	Takaharu Koyama	Japan	14:12.6	
45	4	Wolfgang Riesinger	West Germany	14:15.2	
46	4	Knut Børø	Norway	14:15.8	
47	4	Jørn Lauenbourg	Denmark	14:18.8	
48	5	Hikmet Şen	Turkey	14:26.0	
49	1	Carlos Lopes	Portugal	14:29.6	
50	2	Raymond Zembri	France	14:34.4	
51	3	John Hartnett	Ireland	14:34.6	
52	2	Dick Quax	New Zealand	14:35.2	
53	4	Evans Mogaka	Kenya	14:37.2	
54	4	Ngwila Musonda	Zambia	14:37.4	
55	2	Gert Kærlin	Denmark	14:39.2	
56	5	Fritz Rüegsegger	Switzerland	14:54.4	
57	1	Nji Esau Ade	Cameroon	15:19.6	
58	5	Usaia Sotutu	Fiji	15:24.2	
59	1	P. C. Suppiah	Singapore	15:36.6	
60	3	Abdullah Al-Mabrouk	Saudi Arabia	15:51.0	
61	2	Carlos Cuque	Guatemala	15:53.4	
	1	Jadour Haddou	Morocco	DNS	
	1	Siatka Badji	Senegal	DNS	
	1	Dane Korica	Yugoslavia	DNS	
	2	Mikhail Jelev	Bulgaria	DNS	
	2	Rafael Ángel Pérez	Costa Rica	DNS	
	2	Kerry O'Brian	Australia	DNS	
	3	Jos Hermens	Netherlands	DNS	
	4	Ardelham Khamis	Egypt	DNS	
	5	Miruts Yifter	Ethiopia	DNS	
	5	Crispin Quispe	Bolivia	DNS	

=== Final ===
Rank	Name	Nationality	Time
1st place, gold medalist(s)	Lasse Virén	Finland	13:26.4
2nd place, silver medalist(s)	Mohamed Gammoudi	Tunisia	13:27.4
3rd place, bronze medalist(s)	Ian Stewart	Great Britain	13:27.6
4	Steve Prefontaine	United States	13:28.4
5	Emiel Puttemans	Belgium	13:30.8
6	Harald Norpoth	West Germany	13:32.6
7	Per Halle	Norway	13:34.4
8	Nikolay Sviridov	Soviet Union	13:39.4
9	Frank Eisenberg	East Germany	13:40.8
10	Javier Álvarez	Spain	13:41.8
11	Ian McCafferty	Great Britain	13:43.2
12	David Bedford	Great Britain	13:43.2
13	Juha Väätäinen	Finland	13:53.8
	Mariano Haro	Spain	DNS

== Sources ==
- "Official Olympic Reports". la84foundation.org. Archived from the original on 12 June 2007.
