= Athletics at the 1972 Summer Olympics – Men's 10,000 metres =

Men's 10,000 metres at the Games of the XX Olympiad
- Venue: Olympic Stadium, Munich, West Germany
- Date: 3 September 1972
- Competitors: 51 from 33 nations
- Winning time: 27:38.35 WR

Medalists
1st place, gold medalist(s)		Lasse Virén; Finland
2nd place, silver medalist(s)		Emiel Puttemans; Belgium
3rd place, bronze medalist(s)		Miruts Yifter; Ethiopia

Official video highlights

The men's 10,000 metres event at the 1972 Summer Olympics in Munich was held on 31 August and 3 September. This event featured a qualifying round for the first time since the 1920 Summer Olympics in Antwerp. The favorites in the event included Belgium's Emiel Puttemans, Great Britain's Dave Bedford, and Finland's Lasse Virén. The winning margin was 1.00 second.

The men's 10,000 metres final was notable for Lasse Virén's world record performance. At the start of the race, Bedford led the pace; he maintained a world record pace at the 4000 m mark, and he still led halfway through the race. On the 12th lap, just before the halfway point, Virén and Tunisia's Mohammed Gammoudi, 10,000 m bronze medalist and 5000 m gold medalist in the 1968 Summer Olympics in Mexico City, tangled into each other and fell onto the track. Both recovered, and while Gammoudi fell out of the race two laps later, Virén caught up to the front and passed Bedford to take the lead at about the 6000 m mark.

With Virén leading for the rest of the race, the lead pack reduced to five competitors with 600 m remaining when he made his charge. He ran the final lap (the last 400 m) in 56.4 seconds; he won the gold medal, beating runner-up Puttemans by 7 m and setting a world record time of 27:38.35. Virén would go on to win the 5000 metres event, where he would set an Olympic record there; he also went on to win both the 10,000 metres and 5000 metres races at the 1976 Summer Olympics in Montreal.

The Guardian listed Virén's world record performance as the greatest sport comeback of all time.

== Heats ==
The top four runners in each of the three heats (blue) and the next three fastest (green), advanced to the final round.

=== Heat one ===
Rank	Name	Nationality	Time	Notes
1	Emiel Puttemans	Belgium	27:53.28	OR
2	Dave Bedford	Great Britain	27:53.64	
3	Javier Álvarez	Spain	28:08.58	
4	Abdel Kader Zaddem	Tunisia	28:14.70	
5	Josef Jánský	Czechoslovakia	28:23.15	
6	Anatoly Badrankov	Soviet Union	28:35.84	
7	Noël Tijou	France	28:36.08	
8	Werner Dössegger	Switzerland	28:36.4	
9	Tadesse Wolde-Medhin	Ethiopia	28:45.4	
10	Akio Usami	Japan	29:24.8	
11	Jeff Galloway	United States	29:35.0	
12	Naftali Temu	Kenya	30:19.6	
13	Esaie Fongang	Cameroon	31:32.6	
14	P. C. Suppiah	Singapore	31:59.2	
15	Crispin Quispe	Bolivia	32:31.8	
16	Giuseppe Cindolo	Italy	33:03.4	
–	Günter Mielke	West Germany	DNF	
–	Usaia Sotutu	Fiji	DNF	

=== Heat two ===
Rank	Name	Nationality	Time
1	Mohammed Gammoudi	Tunisia	27:54.69
2	Mariano Haro	Spain	27:55.89
3	Frank Shorter	United States	27:58.23
4	Lasse Virén	Finland	28:04.41
5	Paul Mose	Kenya	28:18.74
6	Rashid Sharafetdinov	Soviet Union	28:24.64
7	Wohib Masresha	Ethiopia	28:28.2
8	Pedro Miranda	Mexico	28:35.8
9	Karel Lismont	Belgium	28:41.8
10	Neil Cusack	Ireland	28:45.8
11	Dave Holt	Great Britain	28:46.8
12	Keisuke Sawaki	Japan	29:29.0
13	Rafael Pérez	Costa Rica	29:36.6
14	Julio Quevedo	Guatemala	30:08.4
15	Abdel Hamid Khamis	Egypt	30:19.2
16	Lucien Rosa	Ceylon	30:20.2
–	Richard Mabuza	Swaziland	DNF
–	Abdi Gulet	Somalia	DNS
–	Per Halle	Norway	DNS

=== Heat three ===
Rank	Name	Nationality	Time
1	Miruts Yifter	Ethiopia	28:18.11
2	Willy Polleunis	Belgium	28:19.71
3	Pavlo Andreiev	Soviet Union	28:20.97
4	Dane Korica	Yugoslavia	28:22.24
5	Juan Martínez	Mexico	28:23.14
6	Lachie Stewart	Great Britain	28:31.33
7	Arne Risa	Norway	28:31.74
8	Jon Anderson	United States	28:34.2
9	Carlos Lopes	Portugal	28:53.6
10	Albrecht Moser	Switzerland	29:05.8
11	Richard Juma	Kenya	29:13.0
12	Domingo Tibaduiza	Colombia	29:24.0
13	Shaq Musa Medani	Sudan	29:32.8
14	Manfred Letzerich	West Germany	29:37.8
15	Hikmet Şen	Turkey	29:51.8
–	Anilus Joseph	Haiti	DNF
–	Gavin Thorley	New Zealand	DNF
–	Juha Väätäinen	Finland	DNS
–	Edmundo Warnke	Chile	DNS

== Final ==
Rank	Name	Nationality	Time	Notes
1st place, gold medalist(s)	Lasse Virén	Finland	27:38.35	WR
2nd place, silver medalist(s)	Emiel Puttemans	Belgium	27:39.35	
3rd place, bronze medalist(s)	Miruts Yifter	Ethiopia	27:40.96	
4	Mariano Haro	Spain	27:48.14	
5	Frank Shorter	United States	27:51.32	
6	Dave Bedford	Great Britain	28:05.44	
7	Dane Korica	Yugoslavia	28:15.18	
8	Abdel Kader Zaddem	Tunisia	28:18.17	
9	Josef Jánský	Czechoslovakia	28:23.59	
10	Juan Martínez	Mexico	28:44.08	
11	Pavlo Andreiev	Soviet Union	28:46.27	
12	Javier Álvarez	Spain	28:56.38	
13	Paul Mose	Kenya	29:02.87	
14	Willy Polleunis	Belgium	29:10.15	
–	Mohammed Gammoudi	Tunisia	DNF	

== Sources ==
- "Official Olympic Reports". la84foundation.org. Archived from the original on 12 June 2007.
