= Fire on the Track =

1995 American sports documentary

Fire on the Track: The Steve Prefontaine Story is a 1995 American sports documentary directed by Erich Lyttle and produced by Scott Chambers. It tells the story of Steve Prefontaine, an American middle and long-distance runner who set records in seven different distance track events from 2,000 to 10,000 meters.

The documentary is narrated by Ken Kesey, and features interviews with Phil Knight, Dana Carvey, Brian Lanker, Kenny Moore, Alberto Salazar, Erich Segal, Frank Shorter, Mary Decker, Mac Wilkins, and Lasse Virén, among others.

It premiered on June 4, 1995, on CBS, and was directly followed by the network's live coverage of the 1995 Prefontaine Classic.

The documentary drew some criticism for its sanitization of Prefontaine's story and for being as much about the Nike corporation as it was about Prefontaine; it was entirely funded by Nike, and the company featured prominently in 15% of the 58-minute film.
