= Fenerbahçe S.K. (athletics) =

Fenerbahçe SK
- Full name: Fenerbahçe SK Athletics
- Nickname: Sarı Lacivertliler (The Yellow-Navy Blues)
- Founded: 1913
- Ground: Dereağzı Facilities, Istanbul, Turkey
- Chairman: (Turkey) Aziz Yıldırım
- Manager: (Azerbaijan) Oleg Mukhin
- League: Turkish Men's Athletics League; Turkish Women's Athletics League
- 2016: Runners-up (Men); Runners-up (Women)
- Website: https://www.fenerbahce.org/branslar/atletizm

Fenerbahçe Athletics is the men's and women's athletics section of Fenerbahçe S.K., a major Turkish multi-sport club in Istanbul, Turkey. Fenerbahçe Athletics' homeground are the Dereağzı Facilities in Kadıköy, belonging to the club.

Fenerbahçe has been active in athletics since 1913 and is the Turkish club that has won the most official championships in Turkey and the most championships in European Cups (21 times); the majority of the significant international successes of the Turkish national team, especially the medals won in the Olympics, have been won by yellow-navy athletes.

Men's team; has been in the top two in the 37 seasons of the Turkish League organized since 1987 and has led the way with 23 championships. In addition; He became champion 11 times in the Turkish Championship held between 1951-1987, 24 times in the Istanbul Championship held until 1988, 17 times in the Rose Cup, 15 times in the Turkish Cross Country Championship, 5 times in the Turkish Cross Country League and 24 times in the Istanbul Cross Country Championship.

Having participated in the European Champion Clubs' Cup since 1985, men's team has won 3 championships (1993, 2006 and 2009) and 4 second places at the A team level, 4 championships (2013, 2014, 2017 and 2019) and 4 second places in the youth category, 4 championships (2009, 2010, 2011 and 2023), 5 second places and 2 third places in the youth cross-country.

Women's team appeared on the track for the first time in 1947 (Mübeccel Argun, who became the champion of the first women's races in 1926, was also a Fenerbahçe athlete). After a 23-year inactivity after 1971, it was re-established in 1994 and since 1995, it has been in the top two in all of the last 29 seasons of the Turkish League and has become the champion 10 times. It has also become the champion 4 times in the Turkish Cross Country League, 1 time in the TAF League, 1 time in the Atmalar League, 1 time in the Turkish Cross Country Championship, 12 times in the Istanbul Championship and 13 times in the Istanbul Cross Country Championship.

Since 1996, women's team, which has been competing in the European Champion Clubs Cup, has won 3 second and 1 third place at the A team level, 8 championships (2010, 2012, 2014, 2015, 2016, 2017, 2018 and 2019) and 2 second places in the youth category, 4 championships (2015, 2018, 2019 and 2024), 3 second places and 1 third place in the youth cross-country.

All three medals Turkey has won in the Olympics in athletics were won by Fenerbahçe athletes Ruhi Sarıalp (1948-bronze), Eşref Apak (2004-silver) and Yasmani Copello Escobar (2016-bronze), Nevin Cevap (2010 and 2012) and Ramil Guliyev (2018) became European champions, Ruhi Sarıalp (1950) and Halil Akkaş (2011) became European third. While Ramil Guliyev became World champion in 2017 and Karin Melis Mey came third in the World in 2009, Ekrem Koçak, Osman Coşgül, Mustafa Batman and Muharrem Dalkılıç won the Inter-Army World championships.

== Honours (Men) ==
=== European competitions ===
- European Champion Clubs Cup

Runners-up (1): 2019

=== Domestic competitions ===
- Turkish Men's Athletics League

Winners (20) (record): 1987, 1989, 1990, 1991, 1992, 1993, 1994, 1995, 1996, 1997, 1998, 1999, 2001, 2003, 2004, 2005, 2006, 2008, 2009, 2012
Runners-up (10): 1988, 2000, 2002, 2007, 2010, 2011, 2013, 2014, 2015, 2016

- Turkish Men's Athletics Championship

Winners (11): 1952, 1953, 1954, 1957, 1959, 1961, 1963, 1965, 1984, 1985, 1987

- Turkish Cross Country Championship

Winners (15): 1954, 1957, 1959, 1963, 1966, 1967, 1972, 1974, 1979, 1980, 1981, 1982, 1983, 1984, 1985

- Turkish Cross League

Winners (3): 1989, 1994, 1995

- Turkish Throws League

Winners (1): 2007

- Istanbul Athletics Championship

Winners (24) (record): 1939, 1940, 1943, 1944, 1946, 1947, 1948, 1949, 1950, 1952, 1953, 1954, 1955, 1956, 1957, 1959, 1961, 1962, 1964, 1968, 1984, 1985, 1987, 1988

- Istanbul Cross Championship

Winners (24) (record): 1949, 1951, 1953, 1954, 1955, 1956, 1957, 1959, 1962, 1963, 1965, 1966, 1967, 1968, 1969, 1972, 1974, 1979, 1980, 1981, 1982, 1983, 1984, 1985

- Rose Cup

Winners (17): 1939, 1940, 1941, 1944, 1946, 1947, 1949, 1950, 1951, 1952, 1953, 1954, 1955, 1956, 1958, 1959, 1960

== Honours (Women) ==
=== European competitions ===
- European Champion Clubs Cup

Runners-up (1): 2015
Third place (1): 2016

=== Domestic competitions ===
- Turkish Women's Athletics League

Winners (8): 1995, 1996, 1997, 1999, 2000, 2009, 2014, 2015
Runners-up (14): 1998, 2001, 2002, 2003, 2004, 2005, 2006, 2007, 2008, 2010, 2011, 2012, 2013, 2016

- Turkish Women's Athletics Championship

Winners (9): 1958, 1959, 1960, 1961, 1962, 1963, 1964, 1965, 1966

- Turkish Cross League

Winners (2): 1999, 2001

- Turkish Cross Country Championship

Winners (1): 1965

- Turkish Throws League

Winners (1): 2007

- Istanbul Athletics Championship

Winners (14): 1926, 1956, 1958, 1959, 1960, 1961, 1962, 1963, 1964, 1965, 1966, 1967, 1968, 1970

- Istanbul Cross Championship

Winners (4): 1958, 1962, 1964, 1965

== Current squad ==
=== Technical staff ===
Name	Nat.	Position
Ziya Özel	(Turkey)	Manager
Gürsel Özyurt	(Turkey)	Department Captain
Fikret Çetinkaya	(Turkey)	Coordinator
İhsan Özden	(Turkey)	Coach
Mesut Tümay	(Turkey)	Coach
Ramazan Kutlu	(Turkey)	Coach
Artun Talay	(Turkey)	Coach
Şenol Özdemir	(Turkey)	Coach
Cahit Yüksel	(Turkey)	Youth Academy Director

=== Current squads ===
==== Men's squad ====
Turkey

- Maxxim Bernardes
- Kale Pucovsky
- Austin Fraser
- Fahri Arsoy
- Fatih Avan
- Serhat Aydın
- Özkan Baltacı
- Sercan Basım
- Fadıl Bombacı
- Emrecan Ercan
- Ramil Guliyev
- Batuhan Işık
- Davut Karabulak
- Ali Ekber Kayaş
- Ahmet Talha Kılıç
- Berk Köksal
- Alper Kulaksız
- Osmancan Özdeveci
- Berkin Özfırat
- Mustafa Özseçer
- Dilek Öztürk (born 2001), long-distance runner
- Furkan Şen
- Abdullah Tuğluk
- İrfan Yıldırım
- Burak Yılmaz
- Tolga Yılmaz

==== Women's squad ====
Turkey

- Ayetullah Aslanhan (born 2001), long-distance runner
- Sare Bostancı
- Hilal Dündar
- Dilek Esmer
- Yudum İliksiz
- Meryem Kasap
- Emine Selda Kırdemir
- Büşra Nur Koku
- Dilek Koçak
- Demet Parlak
- Özge Soylu
- Emel Şanlı
- Tuğçe Şahutoğlu
- Eda Tuğsuz
- Zehra Uzunbilek

== Notable athletes ==
- (Turkey) Halil Akkaş
- Ruhi Sarıalp - first ever track and field athlete from Turkey to win a medal at the Olympics
- (Turkey) Eşref Apak - hammer throw, 2005 Mediterranean Games gold medalist
- (Turkey) (Belarus) Anzhela Atroshchenko - heptathlon, 2001 Mediterranean Games gold medalist
- (Turkey) Fatih Avan - javelin throw, 2x Mediterranean Games gold medalist
- (Morocco) Youssef Baba - 1500 m, African Champion
- (Canada) Donovan Bailey - former world record holder in 100 m, 2x Olympic gold medalist in 100 m and 4x100 m relay, 3x World Champion in 100 m and 4x100 m relay
- (Barbados) Jade Bailey
- (Turkey) (Ethiopia) Selim Bayrak
- (South Africa) Ockert Cilliers - 4x400 m relay, 2008 African Championships gold medalist
- (United States) Justin Gatlin - 2004 Olympic Games gold medalist in 100 m, 3x World Champion in 100 m and 200 m, 2x World Indoor Champion in 60 m and 2x IAAF World Relays gold medalist in 4x100 m relay
- (Turkey) Ramil Guliyev - 200 m, World Champion
- (Austria) (Turkey) (Bulgaria) Nora Ivanova-Güner - 2001 Mediterranean Games gold medalist in 100 m and 200 m
- (Turkey) Nimet Karakuş - 100 m, World Junior Championships silver medalist
- (Turkey) (Russia) Ebru Kavaklıoğlu - 5000 m, 2001 Mediterranean Games gold medalist
- (Turkey) Kemal Koyuncu - 1500 m, 2011 European Athletics Indoor Championships silver medalist
- (Ukraine) Yuliya Krevsun - 800 m, 2009 European Team Championships gold medalist
- (Turkey) (South Africa) Karin Melis Mey - long jump, 2009 World Championships bronze medalist
- (Turkey) Ercüment Olgundeniz - discus throw, 2011 European Cup Winter Throwing gold medalist
- (Slovenia) (Jamaica) Merlene Ottey - 200 m and 4x100 m relay, 3x World Champion and 3x World Indoor Champion
- (Turkey) Demet Parlak - Pole vault Islamic Solidarity Games (2017, 2021, 2025) champion
- (Russia) (Turkey) Tatyana Polnova - pole vaulter, 2003 IAAF World Athletics Final gold medalist
- (Romania) Ionela Târlea - 400 m hurdles, 2004 Olympic Games silver medalist, 2x European Athletics Championships gold medalist and 1999 IAAF World Indoor Championships gold medalist
- Mehmet Terzi - won the gold medal at the 1979 Mediterranean Games in Split, Yugoslavia and 1983 Mediterranean Games in Casablanca, Morocco for marathon and at the road running Istanbul, Turkey in 1985 and San Francisco, USA in 1987 after receiving the silver medal in 1978 Paris, France and 1983 Frankfurt, Germany marathons and serves as the president of the Turkish Athletic Federation since 2004
- (Turkey) Nevin Yanıt - 100 m hurdles, European Champion
