= Pavlo Andreiev =

Soviet long-distance runner

Personal information
- Full name: Pavlo Andriyovych Andreiev
- Nationality: Soviet
- Born: 1 January 1944 (age 82) Kyumel-Yamashi, Russian SSR, USSR

Sport
- Sport: Long-distance running
- Event: 10,000 metres

Pavlo Andriyovych Andreiev (born 1 January 1944) is a Soviet long-distance runner. He competed in the men's 10,000 metres at the 1972 Summer Olympics.
