= Abdullah Al-Mabrouk =

Saudi Arabian long-distance runner

Personal information
- Full name: Abdullah Roaei Al-Mabrouk
- Nationality: Saudi Arabian
- Born: 1 July 1953 (age 73)

Sport
- Sport: Long-distance running
- Event: 5000 metres

Abdullah Roaei Al-Mabrouk (born 1 July 1953) is a Saudi Arabian long-distance runner. He competed in the men's 5000 metres at the 1972 Summer Olympics.
