= Adrian Royle =

British long-distance runner

Adrian Royle (born 12 February 1959) is a retired English long-distance runner born in Manchester. He is notable for running exceptional times on difficult courses, making race organizers think the course had been mis-measured.

== Early life ==
Royle moved to Grimsby as a child and took up running as an 11-year-old at Wintringham School, joining Grimsby Harriers as a 17-year-old. He then moved back to Manchester and joined Manchester Harriers & AC whilst working as a clerk in a rubber factory. In 1980, aged 21, he moved to the United States to attend the College of Southern Idaho and he enjoyed most of his success in America. He easily won the US Junior College Championship later that year.

== Athletic career ==
Matriculating to the University of Nevada, Reno, in 1981 he shocked much better known athletes like Alberto Salazar, Steve Scott, Henry Rono and countrymate Nick Rose by winning the TAC National Cross Country Championships. His time for the 10,000 metre course was over 2 seconds faster than the listed World Record for the distance on the track (set by Rono).

A few weeks later he ran the Lasse Viren Finnish Invitational, an elite 20 km cross country race on hills and dirt trails. His time of 58:38 also surpassed the standing World Record for the distance on a flat course. It was not beaten until 1994 His time still stands as the British 20 km road record. The following year, he also set the British 12 km record.

He is still ranked number 16 on the British all-time list for 10,000m. The time was set in his first attempt at the distance on the track on a rainy day in Eugene, Oregon running behind a stirring duel between Salazar and Rono that exacted revenge for the previous defeat. The picture of the three competitors appeared on the cover of the May 1982 issue of Track and Field News. He returned to the UK in 1983 where he joined Charnwood AC and ran a sub 48 minute 10 mile in 1987 before retiring the next year.

Royle lives in Louth, Lincolnshire, England and has been a prolific photographer and voluntary litter picker.
