= Athletics at the 1989 Summer Universiade – Men's 10,000 metres =

The men's 10,000 metres event at the 1989 Summer Universiade was held at the Wedaustadion in Duisburg on 27 August 1989.

== Results ==
Rank	Athlete	Nationality	Time	Notes
1st place, gold medalist(s)	Julius Kariuki	Kenya	28:35.46	
2nd place, silver medalist(s)	Zeki Öztürk	Turkey	28:39.56	
3rd place, bronze medalist(s)	Antonio Serrano	Spain	28:43.97	
4	Mogambi Otwori	Kenya	28:49.76	
5	Salvador Pineda	Mexico	28:53.34	
6	Antonio Rapisarda	France	28:54.49	
7	Oleg Syroyezhko	Soviet Union	29:04.87	
8	John Scherer	United States	29:05.22	
9	Bob Kempainen	United States	29:06.73	
10	Baek Seung-do	South Korea	29:36.03	
11	Katsumi Ikeda	Japan	29:46.39	
12	Francisco Fontaneda	Spain	29:50.96	
13	Alejandro Martínez	Mexico	29:53.58	
14	Nikolay Chameyev	Soviet Union	31:10.12	
	Walter Merlo	Italy	DNF	
	Paulo Ferreira	Portugal	DNF	
	Steve Boyd	Canada	DNF	
	Ibrahim Elmi	Somalia	DNF	
