= Wolfgang Riesinger =

German long-distance runner (born 1951)

Personal information
- Nationality: German
- Born: 8 January 1951 (age 75) Ostbevern, West Germany

Sport
- Sport: Long-distance running
- Event: 5000 metres

Wolfgang Riesinger (born 8 January 1951) is a German long-distance runner. He competed in the men's 5000 metres at the 1972 Summer Olympics.
