= Harald Norpoth =

West German long-distance runner

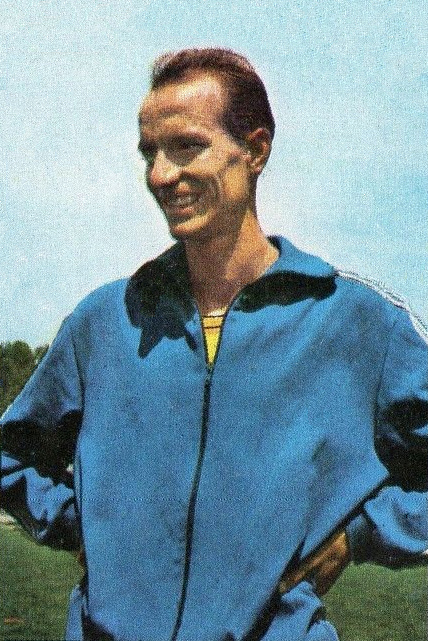
- Harald Norpoth c. 1968

Personal information
- Born: 22 August 1942 (age 83) Münster, Germany
- Height: 1.84 m (6 ft 0 in)
- Weight: 62 kg (137 lb)

Sport
- Sport: Athletics
- Events: 1500 m, 5000 m
- Club: Preußen Münster; LG Ratio Münster

Achievements and titles
- Personal bests: 1500 m – 3:37.8i (1971); 5000 m – 13:20.49 (1973)
Medal record
Men's athletics
Representing Germany
Olympic Games
Silver medal – second place	1964 Tokyo	5000 m
Representing West Germany
European Championships
Silver medal – second place	1966 Budapest	5000 m
Bronze medal – third place	1966 Budapest	1500 m
Bronze medal – third place	1971 Helsinki	5000 m
European Indoor Championships
Gold medal – first place	1972 Grenoble	4×720 m
Silver medal – second place	1970 Vienna	3000 m

Harald Norpoth (born 22 August 1942) is a West German former middle and long-distance runner. He won the silver medal over 5000 m at the 1964 Summer Olympics in Tokyo as a member of the United Team of Germany. He had already competed in the 1962 European Athletics Championships, where he had fallen and dropped out of the 1500 m final. His high quality as both a 1500 m and a 5000 m runner was proved in the 1966 European Athletics Championships, where he won the bronze medal at 1500 m and the silver medal at 5000 m.

At the 1968 Summer Olympics in Mexico Norpoth dropped out of the 5000 m and finished fourth over 1500 m. He also set a 2000 m world record of 4:57.8 minutes in September 1966 in Hagen, Germany. Norpoth remained an international-level 5000 m runner until his retirement from competitive running in 1973, as he finished third in the 1971 European Championships 5000 m final, losing by 1.2 seconds to the winner, Juha Väätäinen. At the 1972 Munich Summer Olympics, he finished sixth at 5000 m, losing by 6.2 seconds to the winner, Lasse Virén, and placing as the fourth best European. In his farewell run at 5000 m in 1973, he set a personal record at 13:20.49. Norpoth was known as a sharp kicker, although he also could endure a fast pace when he was in peak shape. He is a first cousin of political scientist Helmut Norpoth.
