= Gert Kærlin =

Danish long-distance runner

Personal information
- Full name: Gert Wigandt Kærlin
- Nationality: Danish
- Born: 24 July 1950 (age 75)

Sport
- Sport: Long-distance running
- Event: 5000 metres

Gert Wigandt Kærlin (born 24 July 1950) is a Danish long-distance runner. He competed in the men's 5000 metres at the 1972 Summer Olympics.
