= Anatoly Badrankov =

Kazakhstani long-distance runner

Personal information
- Full name: Anatoly Stepanovich Badrankov
- Nationality: Kazakhstani
- Born: 2 April 1941
- Died: 30 May 1998 (aged 57)

Sport
- Sport: Long-distance running
- Event: 10,000 metres

Anatoly Stepanovich Badrankov (2 April 1941 – 30 May 1998) was a Kazakhstani long-distance runner. He competed in the men's 10,000 metres at the 1972 Summer Olympics, representing the Soviet Union.
