= Steve Prefontaine =

American long-distance runner (1951–1975)

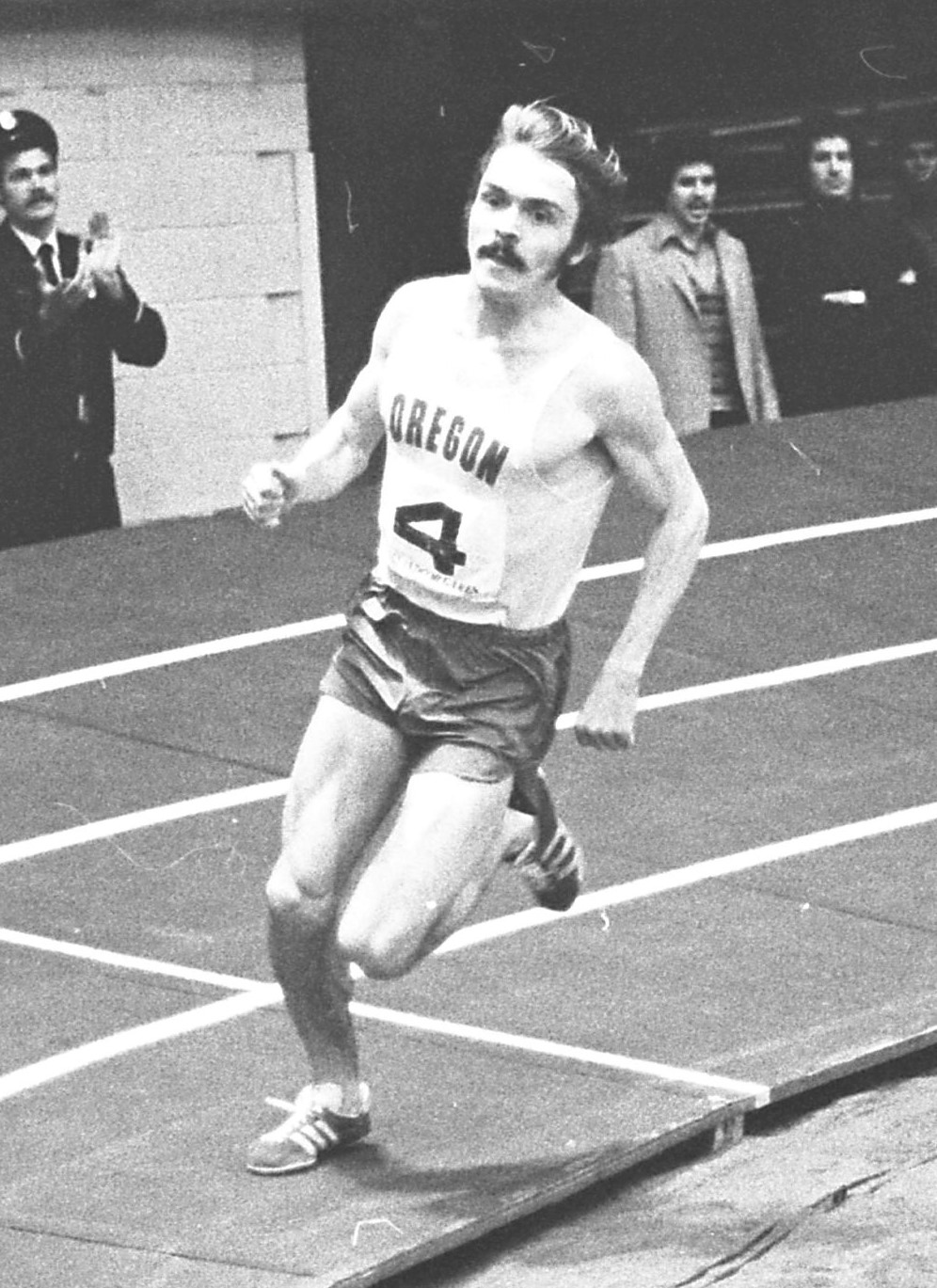
- Prefontaine running race in 1973

Personal information
- Nationality: American
- Born: January 25, 1951 Coos Bay, Oregon, U.S.
- Died: May 30, 1975 (aged 24) Eugene, Oregon, U.S.
- Height: 5 ft 9 in (1.75 m)
- Weight: 152 lb (69 kg)

Sport
- Country: United States
- Sport: Athletics/Track, Long-distance running
- Events: 5000 meters, 10,000 meters, mile, 2 mile
- College team: Oregon Ducks
- Club: Oregon Track Club
- Coached by: Bill Dellinger

Achievements and titles
- Olympic finals: 1972 Munich; 5000 m, 4th
- Personal bests: Outdoor; 1500 m: 3:38.1 (Helsinki 1973); Mile: 3:54.6 (Eugene 1973); 3000 m: 7:42.6 (Milan 1974); 2-mile: 8:18.29 (Stockholm 1974); 5000 m: 13:21.87 (Helsinki 1974); 10,000 m: 27:43.6 (Eugene 1974); Indoor; Mile: 3:58.6i (College Park 1975); 2-mile: 8:20.4i (San Diego 1974)
Medal record
Representing the United States
Pan American Games
Gold medal – first place	1971 Cali	5000 m

Steve Roland Prefontaine (January 25, 1951 – May 30, 1975) was an American long-distance runner who set American records at every distance from 2,000 to 10,000 meters from a period of 1973 to 1975. He competed in the 1972 Summer Olympics, and he was preparing for the 1976 Olympics with the Oregon Track Club at the time of his death in 1975.

Prefontaine's career, alongside those of Jim Ryun, Frank Shorter, and Bill Rodgers, generated considerable media coverage, which helped inspire the 1970s "running boom". He was killed in an automobile crash near his residence in Eugene, Oregon, at the age of 24. One of the premier track meets in the world, the Prefontaine Classic, is held annually in Eugene in his honor. Prefontaine's celebrity status and charisma later resulted in two 1990s feature films about his short life.

== Early life ==
Prefontaine was born on January 25, 1951, in Coos Bay, Oregon. His father, Raymond George Prefontaine (November 11, 1919 – December 21, 2004), was a welder who served in the U.S. Army in World War II. Steve's mother, Elfriede Anna Marie Sennholz (March 4, 1925 – July 16, 2013), worked as a seamstress. The two returned to Coos Bay after Ray met Elfriede in Germany while serving with the U.S. occupation forces. The middle child and only son, he had two sisters, Neta and Linda, and they all grew up in a house built by their father, speaking German with their mother.

Prefontaine was an exuberant person, even during his formative years. He was always moving around, partaking in different activities and events. In junior high, Prefontaine was on his school's football and basketball teams but was rarely allowed to play because of his short stature. In the eighth grade, he noticed several high school cross country team members jog to practice past the football field, an activity he then viewed as mundane. Later that year, he realized he could compete well in long-distance races during a three-week conditioning period in his physical education class. By the second week of the daily mile runs, Prefontaine could finish second in the group. With this newfound success and athletic ability, he fell in love with cross country running.

== High school (1965–69) ==
Prefontaine in 1969

When he got into Marshfield High School in the fall of 1965, Prefontaine joined the cross country team, coached by Walt McClure Jr. McClure had run under coach Bill Bowerman at the University of Oregon in Eugene and his father, Walt McClure Sr. had run under Bill Hayward, also at Oregon.

Prefontaine's freshman and sophomore years were decent, and he managed a personal best of 5:01 in the mile in his first year. Though starting as the seventh man, he progressed to be the second by the end of the year and placed 53rd in the state championship. In his sophomore year, he failed to qualify for the state meet in his event, the two-mile. However, his coach recalls that it was his sophomore year when his potential in the sport began to surface.

With the advice of Walt McClure, Prefontaine's high school coach, he took it upon himself to train hard over the summer. He went through his junior cross country season undefeated and won the state title.

In his senior year, many of his highest goals were set. He obtained a national record at the Corvallis Invitational with a time of 8:41.5, only one and a half seconds slower than his goal, and 6.9 seconds better than the previous record. He won two more state titles that year after another undefeated season in both the one- and two-mile distances.

Some forty colleges across the nation attempted to recruit Prefontaine, and he received numerous phone calls, letters, and drop-in visits from coaches. He referred many of his calls to McClure, who wanted Prefontaine to attend the University of Oregon. McClure turned away those universities that began trying to recruit him late. McClure maintained that he did not sway Prefontaine's collegiate choice, except to ask Steve where all the runners went to college.

Prefontaine wanted to stay in state for college and attend the University of Oregon. He had not heard much from Bill Bowerman, the head coach for the University of Oregon. Prefontaine only received letters from Oregon once a month, whereas other universities such as Villanova were persistent in recruiting him. As a result, Prefontaine did not know how much Bill Bowerman wanted him to attend Oregon. Bowerman stated that he did not recruit Prefontaine differently from anyone else. It was a matter of principle for him to advise recruits where to attend college, wherever it might be, and not bombard the recruits with correspondence. He had followed Prefontaine's career since he was a sophomore and agreed with McClure in his assessment of Steve as a highly talented athlete.

It was not until Prefontaine read Bowerman's letter that he decided to attend the University of Oregon. Bowerman wrote that he was "certain" Prefontaine would become the world's greatest distance runner if he decided to run at Oregon. Although it was an odd promise, Prefontaine was up for the challenge. Sometime after Prefontaine announced that he signed a letter of intent to attend Oregon on the first of May in 1969, Bowerman wrote a letter addressed to the community of Coos Bay describing his appreciation for their role in helping Steve become a great runner.

== University of Oregon (1969–1973) ==
Prefontaine at Oregon

Prefontaine decided to enroll at the University of Oregon to train under coach Bill Bowerman, the co-founder of Nike. He won the 5,000-meter title four times in a row. At this time, he suffered only two more defeats in college (both in the mile), winning three Division I NCAA Cross Country Championships and four straight three-mile/5000-meter titles in track. He was a member of the Pi Kappa Alpha fraternity.

Prefontaine became known as a very aggressive front runner, insisting on going out hard from the start and not relinquishing leads, reminiscent of the renowned 1956 Olympic gold medalist Vladimir Kuts, another famous front runner at 5,000 meters. Prefontaine said, "No one will ever win a 5,000-meter race by running an easy first two miles. Not against me." He would later state, "I am going to work so that it's a pure guts race. In the end, if it is, I'm the only one that can win it." Along with his reputation for leading early instead of pacing himself until the last lap, Prefontaine had tremendous leg speed; his career-best for the mile (3:54.6) was only 3.5 seconds off the world record at the time.

A local celebrity, Prefontaine was frequently met with chants of "Pre! Pre! Pre!" at Hayward Field, a place where famous runners ran. Fans liked to wear T-shirts that read "LEGEND" or "GO PRE", though there was one instance where a group of fans jokingly put on shirts that read "STOP PRE." Prefontaine found humor in the shirts and, when offered, decided to wear one for his victory lap. Prefontaine rapidly gained national attention and appeared on the cover of Sports Illustrated at age 19 in June 1970. He was on the cover of Track and Field News's November 1969 issue.

=== 1972 Summer Olympics ===
In 1971, he began his training for the following year's Olympic Games in Munich, which had special meaning for his family (his mother was German, and his parents had met and married in Germany). Prefontaine set the American record of 13:22.8 in the 5,000 meters at the 1972 Olympic Trials in Eugene on July 9. An underdog at the 1972 Olympics in Munich in September, Prefontaine took the lead in the 5,000 m final during the last mile and ended the slow pace of the first two miles, negative splitting the race. In second place at the start of the bell lap, he fell back to third with 200 meters to go. Lasse Virén took the lead in the final turn over eventual silver medalist Mohammed Gammoudi. Finding himself struggling to keep up, Prefontaine fell back in exhaustion with only 10 meters to go as Britain's hard-charging Ian Stewart overtook him and moved into third place, depriving Prefontaine of an Olympic bronze medal. Prefontaine later said "That was the most disappointed I have ever been. I guess I underestimated the strength of Virén and Gammoudi, and Stewart was way too good for me at the end. That last 200 metres, I felt exhausted. They didn't allow me to run the race the way I had planned to, I was chasing them all the way." Following his fourth-place finish in the Olympic Games, Prefontaine went back to the University of Oregon with a newfound enthusiasm for running after his disappointing showing at the Olympics. This disappointment in his performance drove Pre to train harder than ever for his senior year of athletics, often logging over 10 miles per morning before he started his day.

In his four years at Oregon, Prefontaine never lost a collegiate (NCAA) race at 3 miles, 5,000 meters, 6 miles, or 10,000 meters. Returning for his senior year, he ended his collegiate career with only three defeats in Eugene, all in the mile. It was during this year that Prefontaine began a protracted fight with the Amateur Athletic Union (AAU), which demanded that athletes who wanted to remain "amateur" for the Olympics not be paid for appearances in track meets. Some viewed this arrangement as unfair, because the participants drew large crowds that generated millions of dollars in revenue, with the athletes being forced to shoulder the burden of all their own expenses without assistance. At the time, the AAU was rescinding athletes' amateur status if they were endorsed in any way. Because Prefontaine was accepting free clothes and footwear from Nike, he was subject to the AAU's ruling.

=== Visits to Oregon State Penitentiary ===
Prefontaine had first visited the Oregon State Penitentiary in Salem, Oregon as part of a sociology project. He enjoyed spending time with the prisoners so much that he continued to come back solo to the prison while still enrolled at the University of Oregon to put on seminars and to teach the inmates about running. Prefontaine believed that running could help the prisoners focus on training and racing instead of getting into trouble with all the other prison distractions that went on during the day. One prisoner recounts that Prefontaine treated him and the other prisoners like "regular people" and would sit down and talk about life with them. Furthermore, Prefontaine's "rebellious nature" and charisma also helped him bond on a personal level with prisoners through conversation.

== After college (1974–75) ==
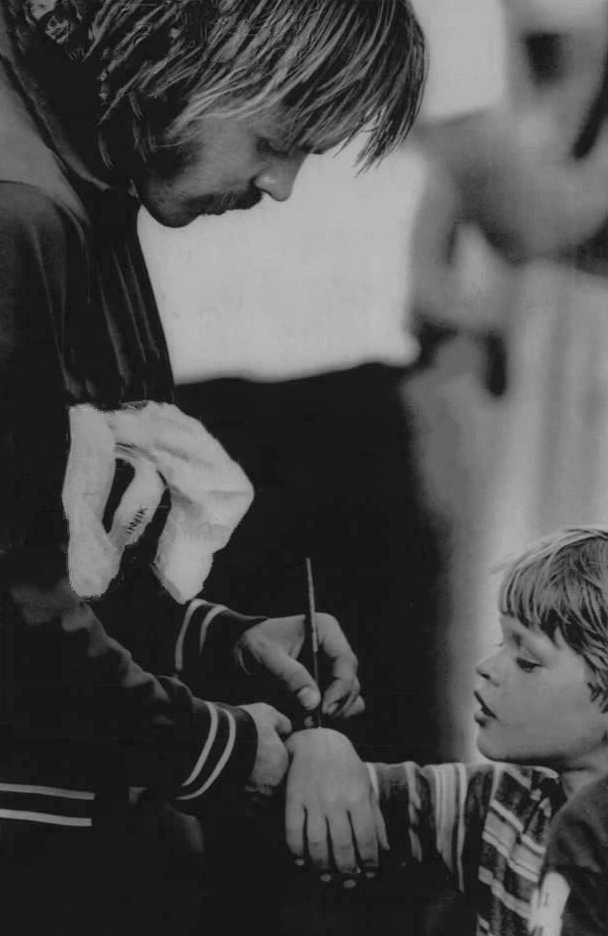
Prefontaine signing a child's arm, c. 1975.

Following his collegiate career at Oregon, Prefontaine prepared for the 1976 Summer Olympics in Montreal. While running for the Oregon Track Club, Prefontaine set American records in every race from 2,000 to 10,000 meters. In 1974, Prefontaine gave a presentation at a banquet. It was held in Eugene the night prior to the Junior College Cross Country Championships. Prefontaine talked about the importance of cross country through his own eyes. After his death, the notes Prefontaine made were given to his family.

== Death ==
In 1975, a group of traveling Finnish athletes took part in an NCAA Prep meet at Hayward Field in Eugene. After the event on Thursday, May 29, which included a 5,000-meter race that Prefontaine won, the Finnish and American athletes attended a party at the home of former Duck runner Geoff Hollister. Shortly after midnight, Prefontaine left the party to drive Frank Shorter to Kenny Moore's home on Prospect Drive, then descended narrow Skyline Boulevard alone, east of the university campus near Hendricks Park.

While in the extended right curve near the base, his gold 1973 MGB convertible crossed the center line, jumped the curb, hit a rock wall and flipped, trapping him underneath it. One of the first people at the scene was 20-year-old Karl Bylund, who raced from the scene in his car to his residence to fetch his father, a doctor.

A nearby resident, Bill Alvarado (1936–2006), arrived next at the scene. He had heard Bylund's car screeching off and reported that he found the man flat on his back, unconscious and pinned beneath the wreck. Prefontaine was pronounced dead at the scene on the arrival of paramedics.

He was 24 years old. His blood alcohol content (BAC) was found by the Eugene Police Department to be 0.16%. In Oregon at the time, a BAC of 0.10% was considered driving while intoxicated while 0.15% was a criminal offense. The official cause of his death was traumatic asphyxiation. No other injuries contributed to his death.

Prefontaine's body was buried in his hometown of Coos Bay at Sunset Memorial Park. A day after his funeral in Coos Bay, a memorial service at Hayward Field in Eugene drew thousands.

=== Aftermath ===
Eugene's Register-Guard called his death "the end of an era." At his death, Prefontaine was probably the most popular athlete in Oregon and, along with Jim Ryun, Frank Shorter, Jeff Galloway and Bill Rodgers, was credited with sparking the national running boom of the 1970s. An annual track event, the Prefontaine Classic, has been held in his memory since 1975. Known as the "Hayward Field Restoration Meet" in its first two years, it was rebranded as the "Bowerman Classic" for 1975 and set for June 7. Two days after Prefontaine's death, it was renamed by the Oregon Track Club on June 1, with Bill Bowerman's approval, and the first "Pre Classic" was held six days later.

During his career, Prefontaine won 120 of the 153 races he ran (.784), and never lost a collegiate (NCAA) track race longer than one mile at the University of Oregon. In 2020, SuperWest Sports included Prefontaine in its list of The Greatest Pac-12 Male Track and Field Athletes of All Time.

The Oregon State Penitentiary run club that Prefontaine helped create still continues to operate and hold races. The prison run club hosts 10 races per year that inmates are allowed to sign up for and includes up to 20 outside guests per race. Each day of the race holds a 5km race and a 10km race that consists of loops around the prison yard. To qualify to participate for the run club, an inmate needs to record 18 months' good behavior.

=== Memorials ===
==== Pre's Rock ====
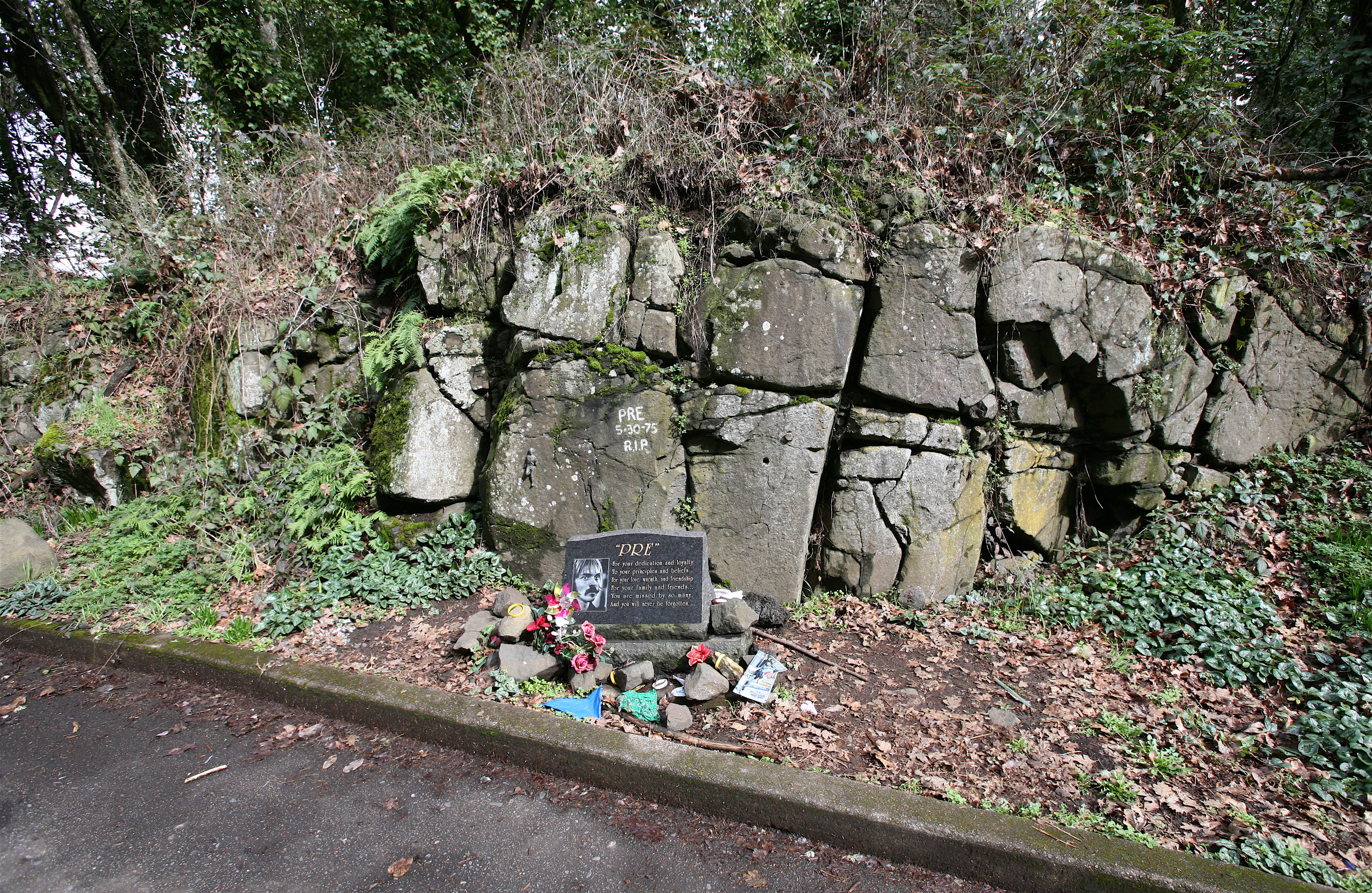
Pre's Rock in 2007

Pre's Rock is a memorial at the base of the roadside outcrop where Prefontaine died. An engraved stone memorial with a picture of Prefontaine, it reads:

"PRE"

For your dedication and loyalty
To your principles and beliefs...
For your love, warmth, and friendship
For your family and friends...
You are missed by so many
And you will never be forgotten...

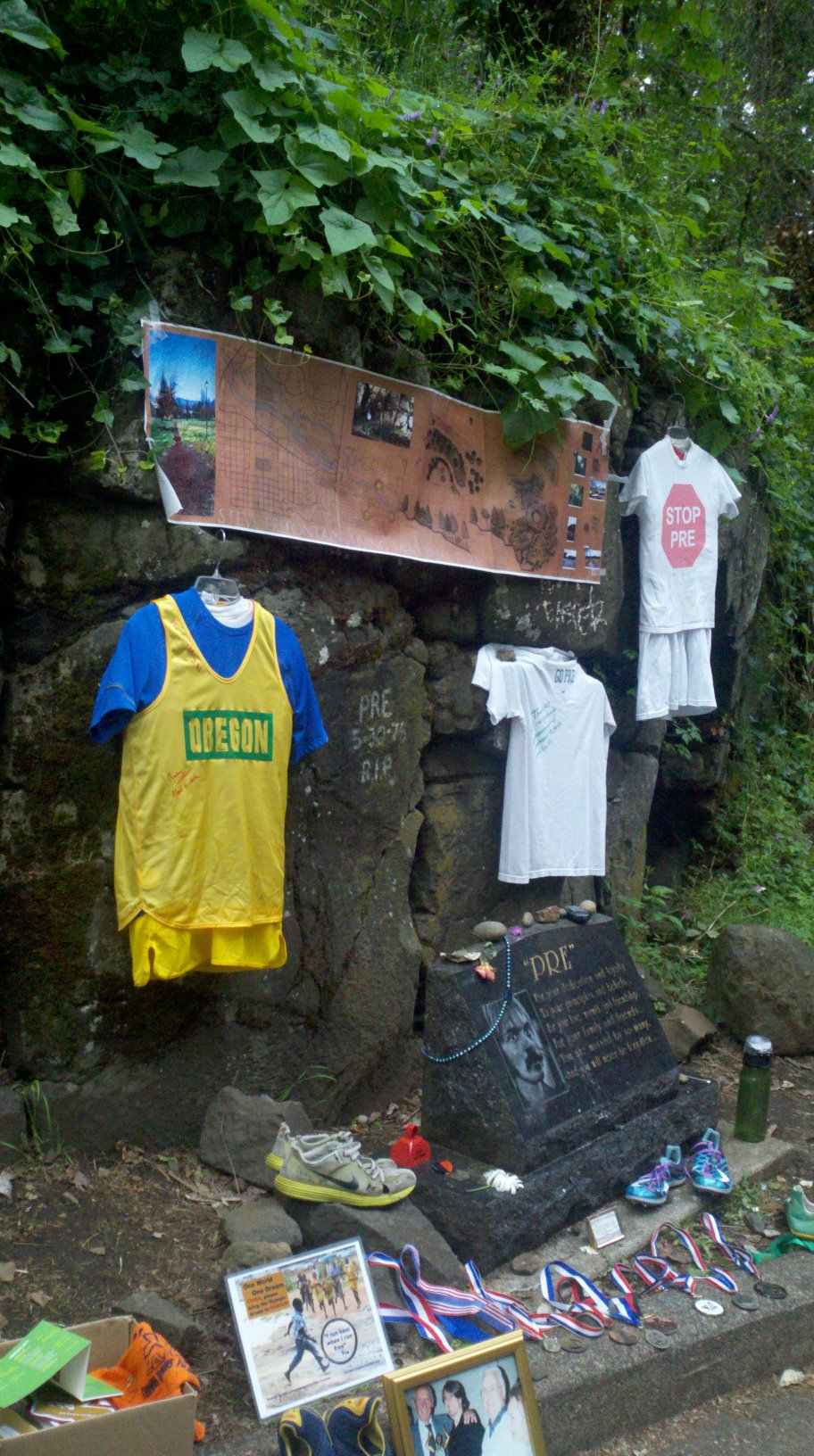
Pre's Rock in June 2012, during the U.S. Olympic Trials

Runners inspired by Prefontaine leave behind memorabilia to honor his memory and his continued influence, such as race numbers, medals, and running shoes. Paying such homage to Prefontaine has become a tradition that reaches a height during important or noteworthy running events in Eugene (e.g. the Olympic Trials or the Prefontaine Classic). As University of Oregon Professor Daniel Wojcik documents in his study of the memorial, Pre's Rock has become both a grassroots shrine and pilgrimage site for athletes and non-athletes from around the world.

Pre's Rock was dedicated in December 1997 and is maintained by Eugene Parks and Recreation as Prefontaine Memorial Park. The rock is a mile (1.6 km) due east of Hayward Field, just across the Willamette River from the east end of Pre's Trail. On Skyline Boulevard, it is approximately 150 feet (45 m) from its intersection with Birch Lane.

==== Other memorials ====
The Prefontaine Memorial, featuring a relief of his face, records, and date of birth, is located at the Coos Bay Visitor Center in Coos Bay. In 2008, ten memorial plaques were laid along the Prefontaine Memorial Race route, the former training grounds of Prefontaine. The plaques bear an image of Prefontaine from his high school yearbook and various quotes and records from his time in Coos Bay. The plaques were part of a grant from the Oregon Tourism Commission, the Coos Bay-North Bend Visitor & Convention Bureau, and the Prefontaine Memorial Committee.

Each year on the third Saturday of September in Coos Bay, over a thousand runners engage in the Prefontaine Memorial Run, a 10k run honoring his accomplishments.

The Coos Art Museum in Coos Bay contains a section dedicated to Prefontaine. This section includes medals he won during his career and the pair of spikes he wore when setting an American record for the 5,000 meters at Hayward Field.

Prefontaine was inducted into the Oregon Sports Hall of Fame in 1983, where several exhibits showcase his shoes, shirts, and other memorabilia. He was also inducted into the National Track and Field Hall of Fame in upper Manhattan where one of his Oregon track uniforms is on display.

The Pete Susick Stadium at Marshfield High School in Coos Bay dedicated their track to honor Prefontaine, in April 2001.

Nike used video footage in a commercial titled "Pre Lives" advertising his spirit for their product. On the 30th anniversary of his death in 2005, Nike placed a memorial advertisement in Sports Illustrated, Eugene's Register-Guard, and aired a television commercial in his honor. Nike's headquarters have a building named after him.

The day after Prefontaine's death, the Register-Guard printed Ode to S. Roland, a poem by his chief American rival, Dick Buerkle.

Prefontaine remains an iconic figure at the University of Oregon to this day. In 2020, the university polled alumni and fans on social media, asking them which four UO alumni they would place on a national Mount Rushmore for the university. Prefontaine was one of the four winners, along with the Nike co-founder Phil Knight; the current NFL player Marcus Mariota, the 2014 Heisman Trophy winner; and Sabrina Ionescu, who had just completed an epic college basketball career for the Ducks.

== In popular culture ==
Prefontaine's life story has been detailed in two feature films: 1997's Prefontaine (starring Jared Leto as Prefontaine) and 1998's Without Limits (starring Billy Crudup as Prefontaine), as well as the documentary film Fire on the Track. He is also mentioned in Charles Wesley Godwin's song, "Strong", where the lines, "And kicking until the end/Like Prefontaine from an outside lane/Proving them wrong/Coming on strong", are within the singer's 2021 song.

== Personal bests ==
At the time of his death in May 1975, Prefontaine held every American outdoor track record between 2,000 and 10,000 meters. His personal best times over each distance, including those records, are below.

Surface	Event	Time	Date	Location	Notes
Outdoor track	1,500 m	3:38.1	June 28, 1973	Helsinki	11th-place finish
Outdoor track	Mile	3:54.6	June 20, 1973	Eugene	runner-up to Dave Wottle
Outdoor track	2,000 m	5:01.4	May 9, 1975	Coos Bay	American record
Outdoor track	3,000 m	7:42.6	July 2, 1974	Milan	American record, broken by Rudy Chapa, May 10, 1979
Outdoor track	Two miles	8:18.3	July 18, 1974	Stockholm	American record, broken by Marty Liquori, July 17, 1975
Outdoor track	Three miles	12:51.4	June 8, 1974	Eugene	American record
Outdoor track	5,000 m	13:21.9	June 26, 1974	Helsinki	American record, broken by Duncan Macdonald, August 10, 1976
Outdoor track	Six miles	26:51.4	April 27, 1974	Eugene	American record, set in the first six miles of his 10,000 m record run (below)
Outdoor track	10,000 m	27:43.6	April 27, 1974	Eugene	American record, broken by Craig Virgin, June 17, 1979

- Conversions: 1 mile (1,609.3 m), 2 miles (3,218.7 m), 3 miles (4,828 m), 6 miles (9,656 m)

== Competition record ==
=== Notable performances ===
Year	Competition	Venue	Position	Event	Time	Notes
1968	Corvallis Invitational	Corvallis, Oregon	1st	2 mile	9:01.3	Oregon high school record
1969	Corvallis Invitational	Corvallis, Oregon	1st	2 mile	8:41.5	US high school record
1969	Coos County Meet	Coos Bay, Oregon	1st	Mile	4:06.9	Oregon high school record
1969	US-USSR-Commonwealth Meet	Los Angeles, California	5th	5000 m	14:40.0	First international track meet
1970	Oregon Twilight Meet	Eugene, Oregon	2nd	Mile	3:57.4	First sub-4 min. mile
1971	Oregon vs. UCLA	Westwood, Los Angeles, California	1st	Mile	3:59.1	
1971	Oregon Twilight Meet	Eugene, Oregon	2nd	Mile	3:57.4	
1971	US vs. USSR All Stars	Berkeley, California	1st	5000 m	13:30.4	American record
1971	Pan American Games	Cali, Colombia	1st	5000 m	13:52.53	
1972	Oregon Indoor Invitational	Portland, Oregon	1st	2 mile	8:26.6	Collegiate record
1972	All-Comers Spring Break Meet	Bakersfield, California	1st	6 mile	27:22.4	Collegiate record
1972	Oregon Twilight Meet	Eugene, Oregon	1st	Mile	3:56.7	
1972	Oregon vs. Washington St.	Eugene, Oregon	1st	5000 m	13:29.6	American record
1972	Rose Festival	Gresham, Oregon	1st	3000 m	7:45.8	American record
1972	US Olympic Trials	Eugene, Oregon	1st	5000 m	13:22.8	American record
1972	Bislett Games	Oslo, Norway	2nd	1500 m	3:39.4	
1972	Bislett Games	Oslo, Norway	1st	3000 m	7:44.2	American record
1972	Olympic Games	Munich, Germany	4th	5000 m	13:28.4	
1972	Zauli Memorial	Rome, Italy	2nd	5000 m	13:26.4	Three days after Olympics
1973	Sunkist Invitational Indoor Meet	Los Angeles, California	1st	2 mile	8:27.4	
1973	LA Times Invitational Indoor Games	Inglewood, California	1st	Mile	3:59.2	
1973	Oregon Twilight II Meet	Eugene, Oregon	1st	2 mile	8:24.6	
1973	Hayward Field Restoration Meet	Eugene, Oregon	2nd	Mile	3:54.6	personal best
1973	World Games	Helsinki, Finland	2nd	5000 m	13:22.4	American record
1974	Sunkist Invitational Indoor Meet	Los Angeles, California	1st	2 mile	8:33.0	
1974	LA Times Invitational Indoor Games	Inglewood, California	2nd	Mile	3:59.5	
1974	Oregon Twilight Meet	Eugene, Oregon	1st	10,000 m	27:43.6	American record; set American 6 mile record (26:51.4) en route
1974	Hayward Field Restoration Meet	Eugene, Oregon	1st	3 mile	12:51.4	American record
1974	World Games	Helsinki, Finland	2nd	5000 m	13:21.9	American record
1974	International Meet	Milan, Italy	2nd	3000 m	7:42.6	American record
1974	July Games	Stockholm, Sweden	3rd	2 mile	8:18.4	American record
1975	CYO Invitational Indoor Meet	College Park, Maryland	2nd	Mile	3:58.6	
1975	Sunkist Invitational Indoor Meet	Los Angeles, California	1st	2 mile	8:27.4	
1975	Oregon Twilight Meet	Eugene, Oregon	1st	10,000 m	28:09.4	
1975	Finnish Tour	Coos Bay, Oregon	1st	2000 m	5:01.4	American record
1975	California Relays	Modesto, California	1st	2 mile	8:36.4	
1975	NCAA Prep	Eugene, Oregon	1st	5000 m	13:23.8	Final race and 25th straight win in a distance over a mile

=== US National Championships ===
Year	Competition	Venue	Position	Event	Result	Notes
1969	AAU Track and Field Championships	Miami, Florida	4th	3 mile	13:43.0	^{[a]}
1970	AAU Track and Field Championships	Bakersfield, California	5th	3 mile	13:26.0	
1971	AAU Track and Field Championships	Eugene, Oregon	1st	3 mile	12:58.6	^{[b]}
1973	AAU Track and Field Championships	Bakersfield, California	1st	3 mile	12:53.4	^{[c]}

^{a} Third fastest 3-mile time ever run by an American high schooler; Prefontaine's first non-high school track meet
^{b} US National championships meet record; fifth fastest 3-mile time ever run and the second fastest by an American; Prefontaine's first sub-13 minute 3-mile
^{c} Broke his own 1971 US National championships meet record; second fastest 3-mile time ever run by an American

=== NCAA championships ===
While at Oregon Prefontaine won seven NCAA national titles: three in cross country, '70, '71 and '73; and four in track, '70, '71, '72 and '73. He was the first athlete to win four NCAA track titles in the same event.

==== Cross country ====
Year	Competition	Venue	Position	Result	Notes
Representing Oregon
1969	NCAA Cross Country Championships	The Bronx, New York	3rd	29:12.0	
1970	NCAA Cross Country Championships	Williamsburg, Virginia	1st	28.00.2	
1971	NCAA Cross Country Championships	Knoxville, Tennessee	1st	29:14.0	
1973	NCAA Cross Country Championships	Spokane, Washington	1st	28:14.8	

- Prefontaine redshirted the Fall of 1972 after the Olympics which made him eligible to run cross country in the fall of 1973.

==== Track and field ====
Year	Competition	Venue	Position	Event	Result	Notes
Representing Oregon
1970	NCAA Outdoor Track and Field Championships	Drake Stadium (Des Moines, Iowa)	1st	3 mile	13:22.0	^{[a]}
1971	NCAA Outdoor Track and Field Championships	Husky Stadium (Seattle, Washington)	1st	3 mile	13:20.1	
1972	NCAA Outdoor Track and Field Championships	Hayward Field (Eugene, Oregon)	1st	5000 m	13:31.4	^{[b]}^{[c]}
1973	NCAA Outdoor Track and Field Championships	Bernie Moore Track Stadium (Baton Rouge, Louisiana)	1st	3 mile	13:05.3	^{[d]}

^{a} NCAA meet record
^{b} A 5000 m race was held this year rather than a 3 mile race
^{c} NCAA meet record for 5000 m; broke Gerry Lindgren's 1968 record of 13:57.2
^{d} Broke his own NCAA meet record and set a stadium record

=== Oregon State high school championships ===
During his junior and senior years at Marshfield High School, Prefontaine went undefeated in both cross country and track.

==== Cross country ====
Year	Competition	Venue	Position	Result	Notes
Representing Marshfield High School
1965	Oregon State Cross Country Championships		53rd	NT	
1966	Oregon State Cross Country Championships		6th	12:36	
1967	Oregon State Cross Country Championships		1st	12:13.8	
1968	Oregon State Cross Country Championships		1st	11:30.2	

==== Track and field ====
Year	Competition	Venue	Position	Event	Result	Notes
Representing Marshfield High School
1968	Oregon State Track and Field Championships	Corvallis, Oregon	1st	2 mile	9:02.7	
1969	Oregon State Track and Field Championships	Corvallis, Oregon	1st	Mile	4:08.4	
1969	Oregon State Track and Field Championships	Corvallis, Oregon	1st	2 mile	9:03.0	
