= Mert Girmalegesse =

Personal information
- Nationality: Turkey
- Born: Shimelis Girma; November 30, 1987 (age 38) Ethiopia

Sport
- Sport: Long distance

Achievements and titles
- Personal bests: 1 mile: 4:00:58 (2008); 3000 m 7:45:46 NR (2009); 5000 m: 13:26:14 NR (2008); 10000 m: 27:29:31 NR (2008)
Medal record
Men's athletics
Representing Ethiopia
World Youth Championships
Bronze medal – third place	2003 Sherbrooke	3000 m
Representing Turkey
European Cup First League
Gold medal – first place	2008 Istanbul	10000 m
Mediterranean Games
Bronze medal – third place	2009 Pescara	10000 m
European U23 Championships
Gold medal – first place	2009 Kaunas	10000 m
European Cross Country Championships
Bronze medal – third place	2008 Brussels	U23 Individual

Mert Girmalegesse, formerly Shimelis Girma (Amharic), then Selim Bayrak (Turkish) (born November 30, 1987), is an Ethiopian-born Turkish middle and long distance track and field athlete, running in the disciplines of 3000 m, 5000 m and also 10000 m.

== Personal life ==
Born and raised in Ethiopia, he transferred to Turkey for an amount of US$1 million. On May 15, 2008, he received Turkish citizenship and changed his name to Selim Bayrak. Two years later, he took the name Mert and changed his surname to Gırmalegese, his family's name in Ethiopia. For the reason of the repeated name change he stated that he wants to safeguard interests in his country of origin.

== Sports career ==
In 2008, he won the 5000 m at the 2008 European Cup First League group B competitions in Istanbul. In the same year he was third at the European Cross Country Championships in his own age category of men under 23 years (U23).

He finished eleventh in the 10000 m at the 2008 Summer Olympics in Beijing with 27:29.33 and did not start in the 5000 m qualification heat 3.

In 2009, he won the 10000 m at the 2009 European Athletics U23 Championships in Kaunas and also won bronze in the 10000 m at the 2009 Mediterranean Games in Pescara.

At the 2009 European Athletics Indoor Championships he competed in 3000 m and finished fifth in Turin.

He is a member of the Fenerbahçe S.K. athletics club.

== Personal bests ==
Discipline	Performance	Place	Date
1 mile	4:00:58	Istanbul, Turkey	June 7, 2008
3000 m	7:45:46 NR	Turin, Italy	March 7, 2009
5000 m	13:26:14 NR	İzmir, Turkey	June 4, 2008
10000 m	27:29:31NR	Beijing, China	August 17, 2008

- NR National record

== Performance progression ==
Discipline	Season	Performance	Place	Date
1 mile	2008	4:00:58	Istanbul, Turkey	June 7, 2008
3000 m	2009	7:45:46	Turin, Italy	March 7, 2009
5000 m	2008	13:26:14	İzmir, Turkey	June 4, 2008
5000 m	2009	13:55:61	Bursa, Turkey	June 9, 2009
8000 m	2008	25:17	Brussels, Belgium	December 14, 2008
10000 m	2008	27:45:75	Istanbul, Turkey	April 12, 2008
10000 m	2008	27:29:31	Beijing, China	August 17, 2008
10000 m	2009	29:36:29	Pescara, Italy	July 2, 2009
10000 m	2009	29:47:15	Kaunas, Lithuania	July 19, 2009
