= Lale Öztürk =

Turkish athletics competitor

Personal information
- Nationality: Turkish
- Born: 1 December 1971 (age 54)

Sport
- Country: Turkey
- Sport: Athletics
- Event(s): Long distance running and marathon

Achievements and titles
- Personal best: 10000m: 35:11.14 (Antalya 2004) Half marathon: 1:18.54 (Samsun 2005) Marathon: 2:35.51 (Milan 2003) 3000m indoor: 9:12.58 (Valencia 1998)
Medal record
Women's athletics
Representing Turkey
Mediterranean Games
Bronze medal – third place	1997 Bari	Marathon

Lale Öztürk, (born December 1, 1971) Turkish athlete of long distance and marathon runner. She won the bronze medal in women's marathon at the 1997 Mediterranean Games held in Bari, Italy. She finished in third place in both the International Trabzon and Eurasia Marathons. Lale Öztürk represented Turkey in the marathon at the 2004 Summer Olympics in Athens, Greece.

Öztürk is married and mother of a daughter. Her husband Zeki Öztürk competed at the middle and long distance running and also was a medalist at the Mediterranean Games.
