= Zeki Öztürk =

Turkish runner (born 1965)

Personal information
- Born: 22 December 1965 (age 60) Istanbul, Turkey
- Height: 1.75 m (5 ft 9 in)
- Weight: 64 kg (141 lb)

Sport
- Sport: Track and field
- Events: 1500 m, 5000 m
- Club: İstanbul BB
Medal record
Representing Turkey
Mediterranean Games
Silver medal – second place	1987 Latakia	1500m
Bronze medal – third place	1991 Athens	1500m
Summer Universiade
Silver medal – second place	1989 Duisburg	10,000m

Zeki Öztürk (born 22 December 1965) is a retired Turkish athlete who competed in middle and long distance running. He represented his country at the 1988 and 1992 Summer Olympics as well as three consecutive World Championships.

He is the husband of fellow Olympian Turkish runner, Lale Öztürk.

== Competition record ==
Year	Competition	Venue	Position	Event	Notes
Representing Turkey
1986	European Championships	Stuttgart, West Germany	28th (h)	1500 m	3:51.72
1987	Mediterranean Games	Latakia, Syria	2nd	1500 m	3:40.53
1987	Mediterranean Games	Latakia, Syria	6th	5000 m	13:56.97
1987	World Championships	Rome, Italy	20th (sf)	1500 m	3:42.17
1988	Olympic Games	Seoul, South Korea	49th (h)	1500 m	3:54.26
1989	Universiade	Duisburg, West Germany	17th (h)	5000 m	14:08.99
1989	Universiade	Duisburg, West Germany	2nd	10,000 m	28:39.56
1990	European Championships	Split, Yugoslavia	29th (h)	5000 m	13:44.55
1991	Mediterranean Games	Athens, Greece	3rd	1500 m	3:43.22
1991	Mediterranean Games	Athens, Greece	4th	5000 m	13:51.79
1991	World Championships	Tokyo, Japan	20th (h)	1500 m	3:42.86
1991	World Championships	Tokyo, Japan	29th (h)	5000 m	14:06.20
1992	European Indoor Championships	Genoa, Italy	11th (h)	3000 m	7:58.33
1992	Olympic Games	Barcelona, Spain	23rd (h)	1500 m	3:41.98
1993	World Championships	Stuttgart, Germany	21st (h)	1500 m	3:41.58
1994	European Championships	Helsinki, Finland	25th (h)	1500 m	3:46.39
1994	European Championships	Helsinki, Finland	18th (h)	5000 m	13:45.62
1995	Military World Games	Rome, Italy	1st	5000 m	28:19.77
1997	Mediterranean Games	Bari, Italy	7th	5000 m	14:04.01
1997	Mediterranean Games	Bari, Italy	–	10,000 m	DNF
2002	World Half Marathon Championships	Brussels, Belgium	84th	Half marathon	1:07:21

== Personal bests ==
Outdoor

- 1500 metres – 3:35.68 (Bologna 1990)
- 3000 metres – 7:47.52 (Udine 1990)
- 5000 metres – 13:26.77 (Zürich 1990)
- 10,000 metres – 28:19.77 (Rome 1995)
- Half marathon – 1:03:04 (Istanbul 1987)
- Marathon – 2:23:07 (Istanbul 2001)

Indoor

- 3000 metres – 7:50.41 (Genoa 1992)
