= Lasse Viren Finnish Invitational =

20 Kilometre race held annually in California

The Lasse Viren Finnish Invitational, frequently shortened to Viren or the Viren 20K, is a 20 kilometre running race held annually on the trails of Big Sycamore Canyon, part of the Point Mugu State Park near Malibu, California.

== History ==
The race was started in 1977 by Finnish sculptor and running guru Eino Romppanen, more frequently known as Eino, to honor his friend Lasse Virén, who had just completed the 5 and 10 double double in the Olympics (winning both the 5,000 metres and 10,000 metres races in the 1972 and 1976 Olympics). Viren had re-captured the Finnish tradition preceded by Hannes Kolehmainen and Paavo Nurmi of the "Flying Finn" which Eino wanted to celebrate.

1978 was a pivotal year in "amateur sports" in general and road running specifically. Over the previous years, athletes were revolting from the financial limitations of their amateur status. They wanted to be able to accept prize money openly. Following the 1972 Olympics, many elite track athletes created and ran in the professional International Track Association, which caused them to lose their Olympic eligibility. At the same time, millions of Americans were enthused by Frank Shorter's 1972 Olympic Marathon victory and were taking to running road races, a phenomenon known as the "Running Boom." By 1978, the athlete's revolt led to the Amateur Sports Act of 1978, breaking the Amateur Athletic Union's regulation of the collection of sports they had governed and the replacement governing body The Athletics Congress, as domestic representatives of the interests of the IAAF and IOC were resisting ways to open the door for professionalism against the tide of commercial interests who wanted capitalize on the popularity of the sport. In Road running, a new organization called the "Association of Road Racing Athletes" (known as the ARRA) was formed to create a professional road racing circuit. Among the 6 charter events of the circuit was the Lasse Viren Finnish Invitational, offering $30,000 in prize money.

The prize money attracted a virtual who's who of elite road runners of the day, including Viren himself. In 1980, Norwegian Grete Waitz ran the course in 1:14:48 and in 1981, an unheralded English college student, Adrian Royle ran the course in 58:38, faster than the world record for the distance at the time. The fame of the race spread. Through the end of the 1980s, the race was one of the major running races on the circuit. The 1988 edition of the race was televised nationally on ESPN. But competition from other events made the sponsorship dollars harder to get.

== Local race ==
A key element, starting with Eino's first race, was the local community race. This event attracted the road running community from throughout the greater southern California area to what is otherwise a decidedly rural location in order to watch some of the best runners in the world. Starting in 1990, the race was reduced to a single race, a situation that has continued the first Sunday in December ever since, excepting one year when a forest fire in the park forced cancellation of the full race (a substitute beach 5K was run that year).
