= Frank Eisenberg =

German long-distance runner (1943–2014)

Personal information
- Nationality: German
- Born: 7 December 1943 Somsdorf, Saxony, Germany
- Died: 12 August 2014 (aged 70)

Sport
- Sport: Long-distance running
- Event: 5000 metres

Frank Eisenberg (7 December 1943 – 12 August 2014) was a German long-distance runner. He competed in the men's 5000 metres at the 1972 Summer Olympics, representing East Germany.
