= Juha Väätäinen =

Finnish former athlete (born 1941)

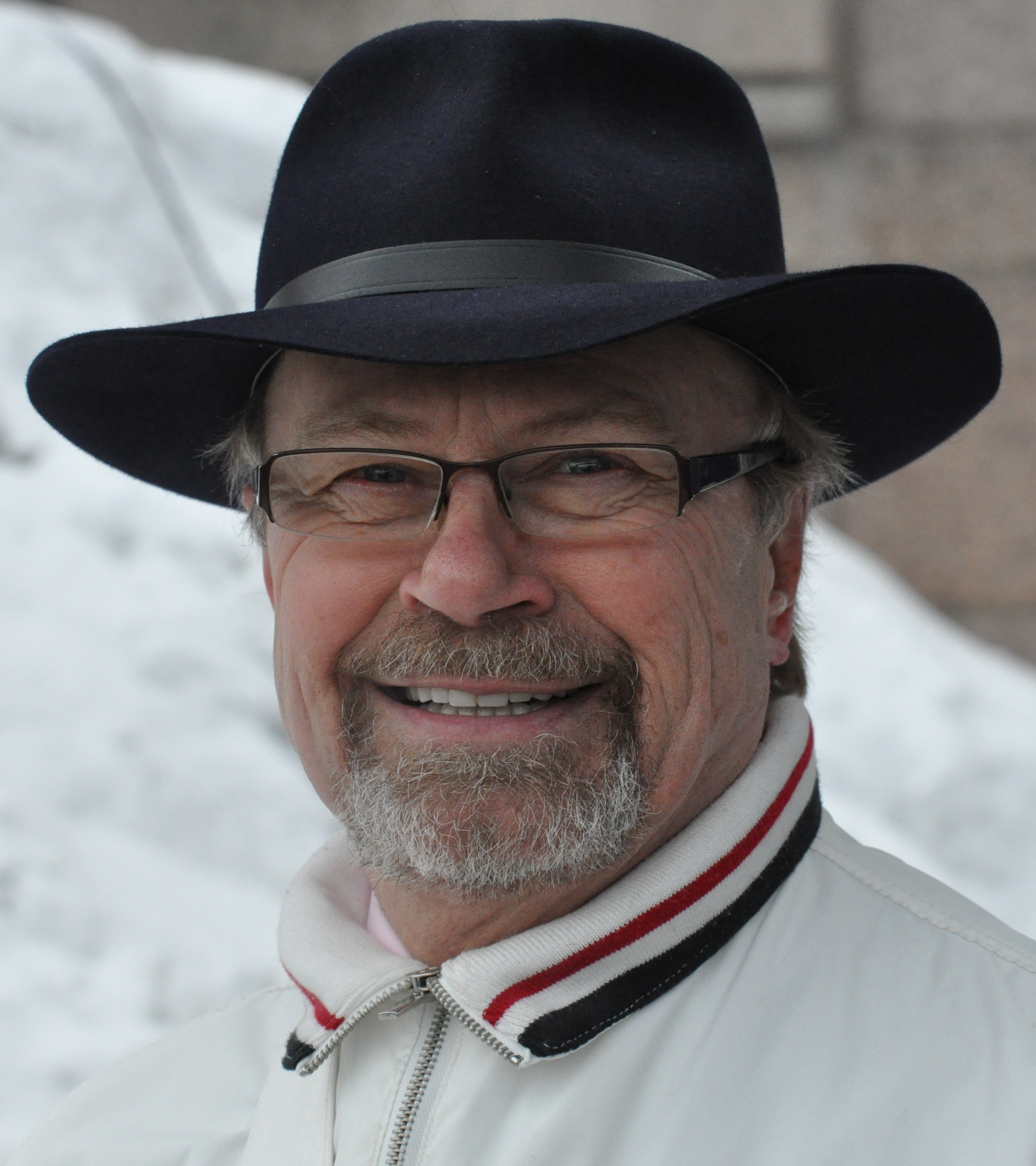
- Juha Väätäinen in 2011.

Personal information
- Full name: Toivo Juha Väätäinen
- Nicknames: Juha the Cruel; Julma-Juha in Finnish
- Nationality: Finnish
- Born: Juha Väätäinen; 12 July 1941 (age 85) Oulu, Finland
- Height: 1.72 m (5 ft 8 in)
- Weight: 60 kg (132 lb; 9 st 6 lb)
- Website: www.juhavaatainen.info

Sport
- Country: Finland
- Sport: Running
- Event: Long-distance
- Club: Haapaveden Urheilijat 1958-67; Oulun NMKY:n Urheilijat 1968-72
- Coached by: Paavo Meskus 1963-68
- Retired: 1972

Achievements and titles
- Olympic finals: 1972: 5000 m 13th
- Regional finals: 1971: 5000 m 1st 1971: 10,000 m 1st
- Highest world ranking: 5000 m: 1st (1971); 10,000 m: 1st (1971)
- Personal bests: 200 m: 22.1 (1967); 400 m: 48.9 (1967); 800 m: 1:48.4 (1967); 1500 m: 3:43.7 (1968); Mile: 4:04.6 (1966); 3000 m: 7:53.4 (1972); 2 Miles: 8:33.0 (1971); 5000 m: 13:28.4 (1972); 10,000 m: 27:52.78 (1971)
Medal record
Men's athletics
Representing Finland
European Championships
Gold medal – first place	1971 Helsinki	5000 m
Gold medal – first place	1971 Helsinki	10,000 m

Juha Väätäinen (born 12 July 1941) is a Finnish former athlete. He is the winner of the 5,000-meter and 10,000-meter gold medals at the 1971 European Championships, held in Helsinki. He was the eldest of the successful Finnish runners, the others being Lasse Virén, Pekka Vasala, Tapio Kantanen, Martti Vainio, and Kaarlo Maaninka, who came into the limelight in the 1970s. He served as a Member of the Finnish Parliament for Helsinki, representing the Finns Party between 2011 and 2015.

== Athletics career ==
=== Early career 1960-68 ===
Väätäinen started his running career as a sprinter. He won his first junior Finnish championship in the 400 metres hurdles in 1960. In 1965–67, his main event was the 800 metres, in which he won Nordic Championship in 1965, beating, for example, young Anders Gärderud.

Väätäinen was coached by Paavo Meskus from 1963 until Meskus' death in 1968. However, Väätäinen was pretty independent and planned his training mostly by himself. He was also interested in altitude training as early as the winter of 1966–67, when he spent seven months in Alamosa as a student.

In the summer of 1968, Väätäinen trained for five weeks in Rhodes. On his return to Finland, he ran the 3000 metres in Helsinki in 8:01.0, improving his personal best by 52 seconds. The competition was won by 3000 metres steeplechase world record holder Jouko Kuha, with a new Finnish record of 7:56.6. After the 1968 season, Väätäinen decided to focus on long-distance running.

=== Move to long distances (1969-70) ===
In 1969, Väätäinen engaged in altitude training for the second time, in Cervinia, Italy. He ran the 10,000 metres in 28:53.0 and the 5000 metres in 13:50.0, and was selected for the European Championships in Athens. However, he was not able to compete because of an infection he developed from a drug injection due to his weak blood test results.

In December 1969, Väätäinen stayed in Frankfurt on his way to São Paulo. His foot slipped on the snowy road and he injured an Achilles tendon. He competed in the Saint Silvester Road Race anyway, placing 26th. As his original intention was to continue training in Brazil after the race, he decided to stay in Penedo, Itatiaia. Because of the injury, his training was reduced until March 1970. However, in April 1970, he ran 1,100 km.

In 1970, Väätäinen improved his personal bests: 13:43.2 in the 5000 metres and 28:19.6 in the 10,000 metres. After the season, the injured Achilles tendon was operated on.

=== European Championships in Helsinki 1971 ===
In the winter of 1970–71, Väätäinen trained again in Brazil. He came in 10th at the Saint Silvester Road Race. In Penedo, he ran over 1,000 km per month. In late March, he flew to Mexico City for altitude training. In Mexico, he ran around 350 km per week. In May, he traveled to California, where he improved his 2-mile Finnish record to 8:33.0. After his return to Europe, Väätäinen continued altitude training in Font-Romeu-Odeillo-Via.

Returning to Finland, Väätäinen set new Finnish records in the 3000 metres (7:56.4) on 20 July in Helsinki; and the 10,000 metres (28:12.8) at the Finnish Championships on 23 July in Oulu.

The 1971 European Championships 10,000 metre final was held on 10 August. The race is regarded by many as one of the greatest distance races of all time. In front of a highly excited Finnish crowd, Väätäinen was in a group of six runners at the final bell following David Bedford, who had led from the start. Väätäinen and Jürgen Haase both kicked past Bedford in a thrilling last lap "burn-up", bringing the crowd to its feet as they battled neck and neck to the line, with Väätainen just edging out Haase in a new Finnish record time of 27:52.78. Väätäinen ran the last 400 metres in 53.8 seconds.

The 5000 metre final was held four days later. Väätäinen won this event as well, beating Jean Wadoux and Harald Norpoth in a new Finnish record time of 13:32.8. This race also came down to a fast last lap, with Väätäinen's flying through the last 400 meters in 53.0 seconds.

In the Track & Field News annual world ranking, Väätäinen was ranked first in both the 5000 and 10,000 metres.

=== Olympics 1972 ===
In the winter of 1971–72, Väätäinen trained at a high altitude in Nairobi. In summer 1972, he suffered from sciatica. At the 1972 Summer Olympics in Munich, he qualified for the 5000 metre final, but disappointed with a 13th-place finish. However, only three days later in Rome, Väätäinen improved his personal best at 5000 metres to 13:28.4. On the following day, he ran 13:35.4 in Helsinki, placing third in the same race that Lasse Virén set a new world record, clocking 13:16.4. Väätäinen ended his athletics career after the season; he attempted a comeback in 1974, but unsuccessfully.

== Professional career ==
By education, Väätäinen is a primary school teacher. However, he has not worked in the profession since the 1960s. Over the years, Väätäinen has worked as a coach, being especially successful in the field of racewalking. He has coached, for example, Reima Salonen and Sari Essayah. Väätäinen served as a head coach of long-distance runners at the Finnish Athletics Association in 1988–90. In the 2000s, Väätäinen worked as a painter. In 2007, he was a candidate in the Finnish parliamentary election, but was not elected. In 2011, he was elected as a member of the Finns Party. He did not seek re-election in 2015.
