= Vladimir Afonin =

Belarusian long-distance runner

Personal information
- Nationality: Belarusian
- Born: 11 December 1947 (age 78) Homel, Byelorussian SSR, USSR

Sport
- Sport: Long-distance running
- Event: 5000 metres

Vladimir Afonin (born 11 December 1947) is a Belarusian long-distance runner. He competed in the men's 5000 metres at the 1972 Summer Olympics, representing the Soviet Union.
