= Gavin Thorley =

New Zealand long-distance runner (1947–2022)

Personal information
- Full name: Gavin Howard Thorley
- Born: 11 June 1947 Wellington, New Zealand
- Died: 3 July 2022 (aged 75) Wellington, New Zealand
- Height: 1.83 m (6 ft 0 in)
- Weight: 64 kg (141 lb)

Sport
- Country: New Zealand
- Sport: Long-distance running
- Events: 5000 m; 10,000 m
- Club: Kapiti Harriers

Achievements and titles
- National finals: 10,000 m champion (1972)
- Personal bests: 5000 m – 13:40.2; 10,000 m – 28:44.4

Gavin Howard Thorley (11 June 1947 – 3 July 2022) was a New Zealand long-distance runner.

Thorley’s first international appearance for New Zealand was at the 1969 International Cross Country Championships at Clydebank, Scotland, where he placed 22nd, the 3rd New Zealander across the line.

His second international appearance In 1971, in a warmup to the International Cross Country Championship in San Sebastián, Spain, saw Thorley win the Belgium Cross Country Championships, ahead of Willy Polleunis, a future European indoor middle distance medalist. However in San Sebastián, Thorley was run into a ditch, robbed of his shoes and unable to finish.

In his warmup to the Munich Olympics, Thorley suffered a severe back injury that hampered his performances and ultimately forced his premature retirement from international level competition.

He competed in the men's 5000 metres at the 1972 Summer Olympics. Later in life he was very active as a volunteer with Special Olympics Kapiti.
