= Mehmet Yurdadön =

Turkish long-distance runner

Personal information
- Nationality: Turkish
- Born: 2 June 1954 (age 72) Sarıkamış, Turkey

Sport
- Sport: Long-distance running
- Event: Marathon

Mehmet Yurdadön (born 2 June 1954) is a Turkish long-distance runner. He competed in the marathon at the 1984 Summer Olympics. Yurdadön was the flag bearer for Turkey in the opening ceremony of the 1984 Summer Olympics.
