= Osman Coşgül =

Turkish long-distance runner

Osman Coşgül (1 July 1928 – 8 October 2001) was a Turkish long-distance runner who competed in the 1952 Summer Olympics.
