= Hikmet Şen =

Turkish long-distance runner

Personal information
- Nationality: Turkish
- Born: 15 July 1942 (age 84)

Sport
- Sport: Long-distance running
- Event: 5000 metres

Hikmet Şen (born 15 July 1942) is a Turkish long-distance runner. He competed in the men's 5000 metres at the 1972 Summer Olympics.
