= Muharrem Dalkılıç =

Turkish middle-distance runner

Personal information
- Nationality: Turkish
- Born: 10 February 1938 (age 88) Gaziantep, Turkey

Sport
- Sport: Middle-distance running
- Event: 1500 metres

Muharrem Dalkılıç (born 10 February 1938) is a Turkish middle-distance runner. He competed in the men's 1500 metres at the 1960 Summer Olympics.
