= Lasse Virén =

Finnish long-distance runner, police officer, entrepreneur and politician

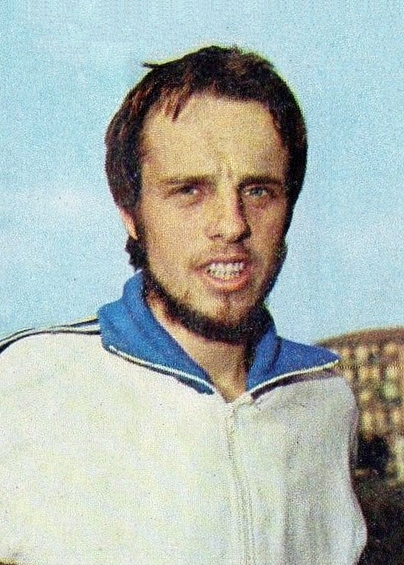
- Lasse Virén c. 1974

Personal information
- Full name: Lasse Artturi Virén
- Nationality: Finnish
- Born: 22 July 1949 (age 76) Myrskylä, Finland
- Height: 180 cm (5 ft 11 in)
- Weight: 60 kg (132 lb)

Sport
- Country: Finland
- Sport: Athletics/Track, Long-distance running
- Events: 5000 metres, 10,000 metres, Marathon
- Club: Myrskylän Myrsky

Achievements and titles
- Olympic finals: 1972 Munich; 10,000 m, Gold; 5000 m, Gold; 1976 Montreal; 10,000 m, Gold; 5000 m, Gold; Marathon, 5th 1980 Moscow; 10,000 m, 5th
- Personal bests: 1500 m: 3:41.8 (Lappeenranta 1976); 3000 m: 7:43.6 NR (Oulu 1972); 2-mile: 8:14.0 (Stockholm 1972); 5000 m: 13:16.4 NR (Helsinki 1972); 10,000 m: 27:38.35 (Munich 1972); Marathon: 2:13:11 (Montreal 1976)
Medal record
Men's athletics
Representing Finland
Olympic Games
| Gold medal – first place | 1972 Munich | 10,000 m |
| Gold medal – first place | 1972 Munich | 5000 m |
| Gold medal – first place | 1976 Montreal | 10,000 m |
| Gold medal – first place | 1976 Montreal | 5000 m |
European Championships
| Bronze medal – third place | 1974 Rome | 5000 m |

Lasse Artturi Virén (born 22 July 1949) is a Finnish former long-distance runner, winner of four gold medals at the 1972 and 1976 Summer Olympics. Virén recaptured the image of the "Flying Finns" promoted by runners like Hannes Kolehmainen, Paavo Nurmi and Ville Ritola in the 1920s. He was elected Finnish Sportsman of the Year in 1972 and 1976 and later became a politician and a member of Finland's parliament in 1999–2007 and 2010–2011.

== Biography ==
=== Early career ===
Virén began his running career in the United States at Brigham Young University, in Provo, Utah. Virén ran on the Varsity Cross-Country team for BYU for one season, before returning home to his native Finland. A police officer from Myrskylä, Virén debuted on the international scene in 1971. His performances at the 1971 European Championships in Helsinki were overshadowed by fellow Finn Juha Väätäinen, who captured gold medals in both the 5,000 and 10,000 metres events with Virén settling for modest seventh and 17th placings, respectively. According to Virén himself and his coach, Rolf Haikkola, Virén could have placed better in the 1971 European Athletics Championships, if he had done the "emptying exercise" of his system earlier – according to Haikkola, he followed the Finnish Athletics Federation's leaders' bad advice – and if he hadn't been pushed almost to the point of falling at the start of the last lap in the 5,000 metres final. The "emptying exercise" of top runners means that they push their bodies to a total exhaustion or lack of energy so that their bodies can again receive much energy, and so that they can repeat their top race performances. Shortly after those European Championships, he broke Väätäinen's fresh Finnish record at 5,000 metres.

Buoyed by a brutal training regimen in Thomson's Falls, Kenya, and very impressive results, which included the smashing of the 2-mile world record and wins against Great Britain and Spain in a meet held in Helsinki in the summer of 1972, Lasse Virén entered the Munich Games as a dark horse.

=== 1972 Olympics ===
At the 1972 Summer Olympics at Munich, Virén won both the 5,000 and the 10,000 metres events. At the 10,000 metres final held on 3 September, Virén broke Ron Clarke's seven-year-old world record despite falling in the twelfth lap after getting tangled with Emiel Puttemans. Mohamed Gammoudi also fell after being tripped by Virén's legs. In less than 150 metres, Virén caught up with the leading pack after having lost about 20 metres. With 600 metres to go, Virén started an unprecedented lap-and-a-half kick to which only Puttemans was able to respond. The Finn won the race in 27:38.35.

Virén became the fourth athlete to win both events in the same Olympics, joining fellow Finn Hannes Kolehmainen (1912), Czechoslovakia's Emil Zátopek (1952) and Russian Vladimir Kuts (1956). At subsequent Olympics, Miruts Yifter (1980) and Kenenisa Bekele (2008), both from Ethiopia, and Mo Farah from Great Britain (2012 and 2016) accomplished the coveted "double". However, only Kolehmainen, Virén and Miruts Yifter had to endure 10,000 metres heats to qualify for the 10,000 metres final. In the 5,000-metres final one week later, Virén could keep up with Steve Prefontaine, Gammoudi, Puttemans and Ian Stewart, in the race's quick final four laps. He sprinted past Gammoudi with around 110 to 120 metres to go, and won in 13:26.4, one second before Gammoudi. Four days later, despite the wet, chilly and windy weather in the Helsinki Olympic Stadium, he set a new world record at 5,000 metres by running 13:16.4. Six days later, Puttemans broke the record by 3.4 seconds.

One factor in Virén's Olympic victories, especially at the 1972 Olympics 5,000 and 10,000 metres, has received little attention: his careful running of almost all the bends (curves) near the inner edge of the first lane, which spared him tens of metres compared to his chief rivals. More specifically, Steve Prefontaine gave Virén an advantage of more than forty metres over 5,000 m in 1972, while Emiel Puttemans gave about fifty metres over 10,000 m, by running many bends wide on the outer edge of the first lane or sometimes even on the second lane. This metre-saving practice is called "bend (curve) mathematics".

=== 1976 Olympics ===
Virén ran at lower levels between the Olympics. At the 1976 Summer Olympics, Virén again won both events, coined later as the "double double", and became the first repeat winner of the 5,000 metres race in Olympic history (since joined by Mo Farah). He won the 10,000-metre final comparatively easily, because even Great Britain's Brendan Foster dropped from the steadily accelerating pace of Portugal's Carlos Lopes at 8,000 metres, and because Lopes back then was unable to radically increase his pace in the last lap or so of track races. Virén passed Lopes at around 9,550 metres and defeated him by 4.79 seconds.

Following his 10,000 metres final win at the Montreal games, he took off his Onitsuka Tiger (ASICS) Runspark shoes and waved them to the crowd on his victory lap. The International Olympic Committee accused Virén of malicious intent, such as showing the tiger stripe logo on the shoes, but he claimed that he had a blister. Thus, the IOC suspended Virén from taking place in the 5,000-metres final after qualifying in his heat. An appeal followed and he was allowed to enter the race, two hours before gun time.

In the 5,000 metres final, he held off all-time greats Dick Quax, Rod Dixon and Brendan Foster (all world-class at 1,500 m) with a devastating display of front-running over the last few laps. To those who watched him, the display was awesomely inspiring to the point that his last 1,500 metres in that final would have placed him 8th in the 1,500-metres final held at those Games. The top four runners sprinted to the finish line inside six metres, a rare occurrence in major international championships. He competed in the men's marathon, his first marathon and finished fifth in 2:13:11.

=== 1980 Olympics ===
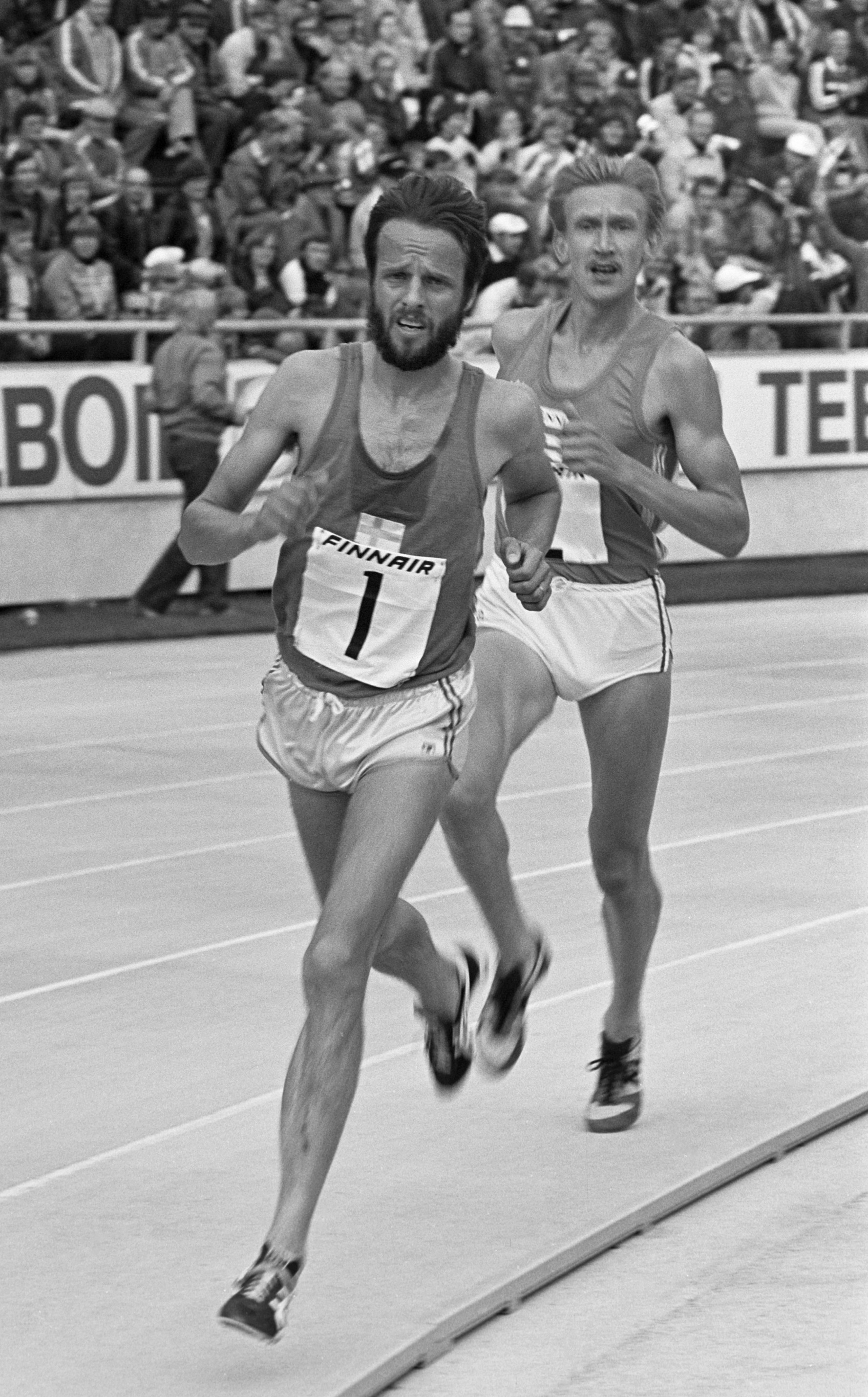
Virén (left) in 1980

Virén ended his career after the 1980 Summer Olympics, where he placed fifth in the 10,000 metres. Virén qualified for that final, placing fourth and having clocked a disappointing 28:45 in his heat. Only after Ireland's John Treacy collapsed during his heat, due to heat stroke, was Virén given an automatic place in the final. Otherwise, he would have qualified for the final as a fastest loser. He pushed that final's leading pack until the last 300 metres, before succumbing to the spurt of Miruts Yifter, the eventual gold medalist. Some people claimed that Virén could have run better in the 1980 Olympics if he had not done so much marathon-like training. Virén himself believes that if he had not injured his leg shortly before the Olympics, he would have run clearly better. Another account suggests that the main issues arose from the fact that Virén had neglected to bring a masseur to his months long endurance training camps in Colombia and on the Canary Islands during the preparation phase for the Moscow Olympics, resulting in stiffened leg muscles during the following speed training phase of the preparation, which made the speed training inefficient, caused the above-mentioned injuries, and left him with an insufficient top speed. Virén skipped the 5,000-metres race and chose to compete in the Olympic marathon, where he started quite well, running over 20 kilometres in the lead group. Stomach problems, however, caused him to drop out before 30 kilometres. In the autumn of 1980, he announced his retirement from active competitive running.

=== Outside the Olympics ===
After a complex leg surgery early in 1974, and between his Olympic double victories, he won a bronze medal in the 5,000 m at the European championships behind the British athlete Brendan Foster with a time of 13:24.57. Two days later, in Helsinki, Virén won a 5,000 m race in 13:26.0, defeating Anders Gärderud (Sweden). Three days after this Helsinki race, Virén again encountered Foster in a 2-mile (3.2-km) race at the Coca-Cola international meet in London at the Crystal Palace. Foster was again victorious, with Virén finishing fourth, only 0.06 seconds behind the second place runner. Virén recorded his fastest 10,000 m for the 1974 season with a winning time of 28:22.6 at a Finland vs. Soviet Union international meet on 21 September.

Virén had broken the world records for both the 2-mile and the 5,000 m outside the Olympics. Both were done in close proximity to the 1972 Olympics: his 8:14.0 for two miles was on 14 August 1972 and his 13:16.4 for a 5,000 m race on 14 September 1972.

Virén's success outside the Olympics in running near his best Olympic-year times was better in 5,000m events than in 10,000m ones. Virén broke 13:36 in the 5000m consistently outside Olympic years and sometimes even broke 13:30. At 10,000m he only broke 28 minutes in the Olympic years.

In 1979, Virén competed in New Zealand, running the summer international series there while in the midst of his endurance training for the Moscow Olympics of 1980.

Established in 1977 by the Finnish sculptor Eino Romppanen, the Lasse Virén Finnish Invitational, later the "Lasse Virén 20K", was an annual off-road running race in Sycamore Canyon, part of Point Mugu State Park near Malibu, California, held through 2012.

Since his career ended he has become a well-known figure in Finland, eventually holding a seat in the Finnish Parliament with the National Coalition Party from 1999 until 2007 and from 2010 to 2011. Virén did not seek re-election in 2011.

In 2014 Virén was inducted into the International Association of Athletics Federations' Hall of Fame.

Awards and achievements
| Preceded by (United States) Rod Milburn | Track & Field Athlete of the Year; 1972 | Succeeded by (Kenya) Ben Jipcho |
Records
| Preceded by (Australia) Ron Clarke | Men's 10,000 m World Record Holder; 3 September 1972 – 13 July 1973 | Succeeded by (United Kingdom) David Bedford |
| Preceded by (Australia) Ron Clarke | Men's 5000 m World Record Holder; 14 September 1972 – 20 September 1972 | Succeeded by (Belgium) Emiel Puttemans |
