= 1999 New Year Honours =

British royal recognitions

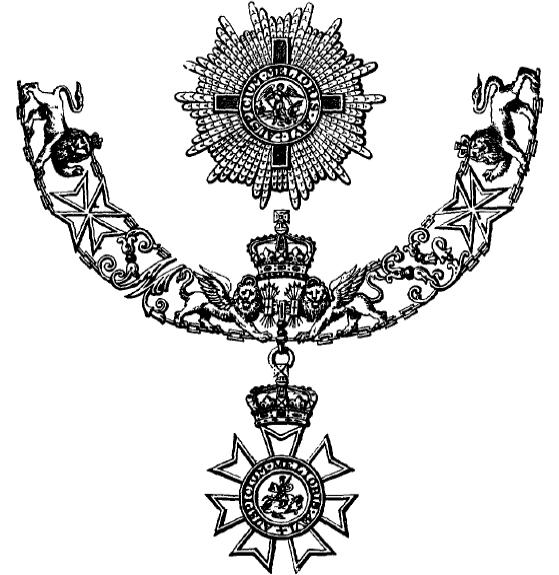
The insignia of the Grand Cross of the Order of St Michael and St George

The New Year Honours 1999 for various Commonwealth realms were announced on 30 December 1998, to celebrate the year passed and mark the beginning of 1999. The Honours list is a list of people who have been awarded one of the various orders, decorations, and medals of the United Kingdom. Honours are split into classes ("orders") and are graded to distinguish different degrees of achievement or service, most medals are not graded. The awards are presented to the recipient in one of several investiture ceremonies at Buckingham Palace throughout the year by the Sovereign or designated representative. The Prince of Wales (now Charles III) and The Princess Royal deputised for The Queen.

The orders, medals and decorations are awarded by various honours committees which meet to discuss candidates identified by public or private bodies, by government departments or who are nominated by members of the public. Depending on their roles, those people selected by committee are submitted either to the prime minister, Secretary of State for Foreign and Commonwealth Affairs, or Secretary of State for Defence for their approval before being sent to the Sovereign for final approval. As the "fount of honour" the monarch remains the final arbiter for awards. In the case of certain orders such as the Order of the Garter and the Royal Victorian Order they remain at the personal discretion of the Queen.

The recipients of honours are displayed here as they were styled before their new honour, and arranged by honour, with classes (Knight, Knight Grand Cross, etc.) and then divisions (Military, Civil, etc.) as appropriate.

== United Kingdom of Great Britain and Northern Ireland ==
=== Life peers ===
- Onora Sylvia O'Neill, CBE, Principal, Newnham College, Cambridge.
- Sir Peter Michael Imbert, QPM, JP, Lord Lieutenant of Greater London
- Sir Naren Patel, Consultant Obstetrician, Ninewells Hospital, Dundee; lately President of the Royal College of Obstetricians and Gynaecologists and past Chairman, Academy of Medical Royal Colleges.
- Sir Alexander Trotman, lately Chairman and Chief Executive Officer, Ford Motor Company.
- Sir David Francis Williamson, GCMG, CB, formerly Secretary-General of the European Commission.

=== Privy Counsellors ===
- Adam Paterson Ingram, JP, MP for East Kilbride and Minister of State for the Northern Ireland Office.
- Walter Menzies Campbell, CBE, QC, MP for Fife North East.
- Paul Peter Murphy, MP for Torfaen and Minister of State for the Northern Ireland Office.

=== Members of the Order of the Companions of Honour (CH) ===
- The Right Honourable John Major, MP for Huntingdon. For services to Peace in Northern Ireland.
- Bridget Louise Riley, CBE, artist. For services to Art.
- General Alfred John Gardyne Drummond De Chastelain, CMM, OC, Co-Chairman, Northern Ireland Talks.

=== Knights Bachelor ===
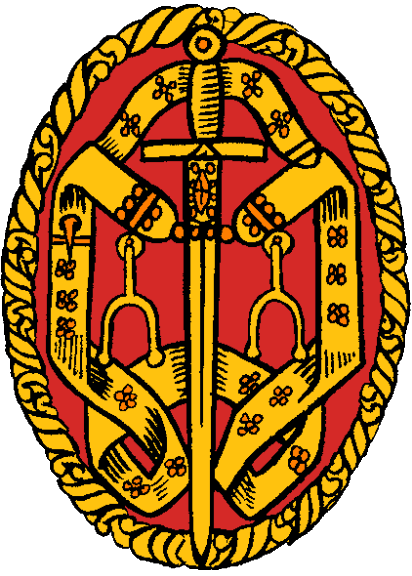
The insignia of a Knights Bachelor

A Knights Bachelor is the rank of a man who has been knighted by the monarch but not as a member of one of the organised Orders of Chivalry.

- Maurice Victor Blank, Deputy Chairman, Great Universal Stores and Chairman, Mirror Group.
- John Alexander Raymond Chisholm, Chief Executive, Defence Evaluation and Research Agency, Ministry of Defence.
- David John Davies, lately Chairman, Advisory Committee on Business and the Environment. For leading business in abating Air Pollution.
- Andrew Frank Davis, CBE, Conductor. For services to Music.
- Professor Michael Anthony Eardley Dummett, Emeritus Professor of Logic, University of Oxford. For services to Philosophy and to Racial Justice.
- Reginald Norman Morgan Empey, OBE, Member, Belfast City Council. For political and public service.
- Ronald Flanagan, OBE, Chief Constable, Royal Ulster Constabulary. For services to the Police.
- Ian Gibson, CBE, Vice President, Nissan Europe and Chief Executive, Nissan Motor Manufacturing (UK) Ltd. For services to the car manufacturing industry.
- Professor Denis John Pereira Gray, OBE, General Medical Practitioner and President, Royal College of General Practitioners. For services to Quality and Standards in General Practice.
- John Ralph Sidney Guinness, CBE, Chairman, British Nuclear Fuels plc. For services to the Nuclear Industry.
- Nigel Barnard Hawthorne, CBE, Actor. For services to the Theatre, Film and Television.
- Lyndon Jones, Principal and Chief Executive, Harris City Technology College. For services to education.
- Professor John Richard Krebs, FRS, Chief Executive, Natural Environment Research Council. For services to Behavioural Ecology.
- George Ross Mathewson, CBE, Group Chief Executive, Royal Bank of Scotland plc. For services to Economic Development and to Banking.
- Charles Alan McLintock. For services to the Church of England.
- Mohammed Anwar Pervez, OBE, Chairman, Bestway Ltd. For services to the Food Retail and Wholesale Sector and for charitable services.
- Professor Michael David Rawlins. For services to the Improvement of Patient Protection from the Side Effects of Medicinal Drugs.
- Henry John Roche. For services to the Newspaper Industry.
- Nicholas Andrew Serota, Director, Tate Gallery. For services to the Visual Arts.
- James Shand, MBE, Accordionist and Scottish Country Band Leader. For services to Scottish Culture.
- Professor Eric Brian Smith. For services to Academic/Business Partnership and to Higher Education.
- Graham William Smith, CBE, Her Majesty's Chief Inspector of Probation. For services to the Probation Service.
- Peter Alfred Soulsby, Leader, Leicester City Council. For services to Leicester and to Local Government.
- Quentin Jeremy Thomas, CB. For services to Peace in Northern Ireland.
- John Ernest Walker, FRS. For services to Molecular Biology.
- John Kemp-Welch, Chairman, London Stock Exchange. For services to Financial Regulation and to Financial Services.
- Francis Owen Garbett Williams, CBE, Chairman and Managing Director, Williams Grand Prix Engineering Ltd. For services to the Motor Sport Industry.
- John Kyffin Williams, OBE, DL. For services to the Visual Arts in Wales.
- David Ross Winkley, Director, National Primary Trust. For services to Primary Education.
- Po-Shing Woo. For charitable services to the Arts.

=== Order of the Bath ===
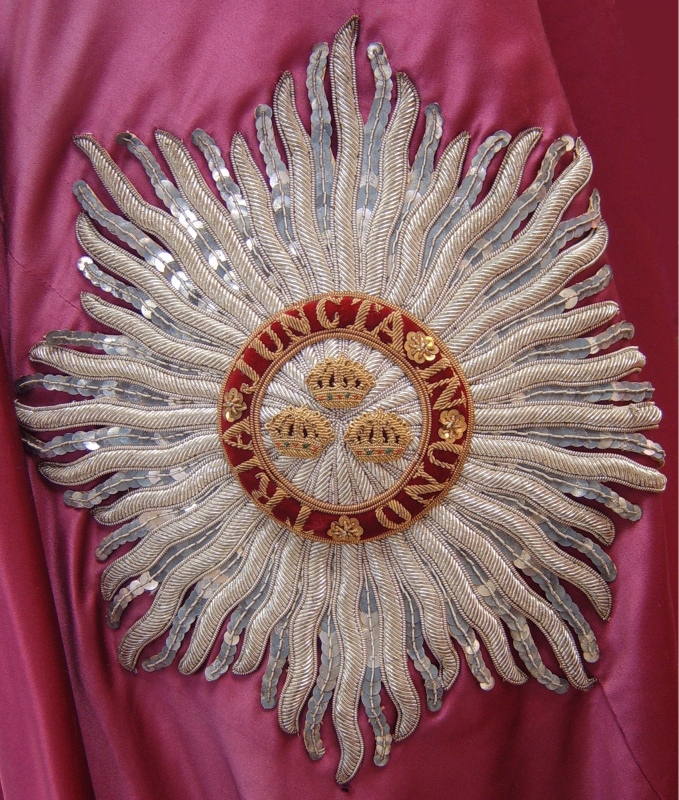
Representation of the star of the Order of the Bath (civil division).

The Most Honourable Order of the Bath is the fourth-most senior of the British Orders of Chivalry with three classes of member.

==== Knights Grand Cross of the Bath (GCB) ====
Civil division

- Sir Nigel Leonard Wicks, KCB, CVO, CBE, Second Permanent Secretary of Finance, HM Treasury.

==== Knights Commander of the Bath (KCB) ====
Military division

Royal Navy

- Vice-Admiral Jeremy Joe Blackham.

Army

- Lieutenant General Scott Carnegie Grant, CB (479236), late Corps of Royal Engineers

Air Force

- Air Marshal John Romney Day, OBE, Royal Air Force.

Civil division

- Robin Mountfield, CB, Permanent Secretary of the Cabinet Office.
- Michael Charles Scholar, CB, Permanent Secretary of the Department of Trade and Industry.

==== Companions of the Bath (CB) ====
Military division

Royal Navy

- Vice-Admiral David Anthony James Blackburn, LVO
- Rear Admiral John Allan Trewby

Army

- Major General Graham Anderson Ewer, CBE (479220), late Royal Corps of Transport.
- Major General Richard Arthur Oliver, OBE (479312), late Corps of Royal Engineers.
- Major General William Robert Short (477487), late Royal Army Medical Corps.

Air Force

- Air Vice-Marshal Roderick Harvey Goodall, CBE, A.F.C., Royal Air Force.
- The Venerable Peter Robin Turner, Royal Air Force

Civil division

- Mark Andrew Blythe. Legal Adviser, HM Treasury; (London).
- Graham Duff. Lately director, Casework Services, Crown Prosecution Service; (Northumberland).
- David John Fisk. Chief Scientist and director, Environment International, Department of the Environment, Transport and the Regions; (St Albans, Hertfordshire).
- Vera Kathleen Gordon. Head, Agricultural Crops and Commodities Directorate, Ministry of Agriculture, Fisheries and Food; (London).
- Derek James Langlands Grover. Director, Skills and Lifelong Learning, Department for Education and Employment; (Sheffield, South Yorkshire).
- Jeremy John Moore Harbison. For public service; (Belfast, Northern Ireland).
- Paul Richard Samuel Hartnack. Comptroller General, Patent Office, Department of Trade and Industry; (Hitchin, Hertfordshire).
- Alfred James Hastings. Clerk of the Journals, House of Commons; (Oxford, Oxfordshire).
- Michael McKenzie, QC. Master of the Crown Office and Queen's Coroner and Attorney, Registrar of Criminal Appeals and of the Courts-Martial Appeal Court, Lord Chancellor's Department.
- Anthony Charles Sawyer. Director, Operations Prevention, HM Board of Customs and Excise; (London).
- Geoffrey Richard Scaife. Chief executive, NHS in Scotland; (Edinburgh).

=== Order of St Michael and St George ===
Representation of the star of a Knight or Dame Grand Cross

The Most Distinguished Order of St Michael and St George is an order of chivalry used to honour individuals who have rendered important services in relation to Commonwealth or foreign nations;.

==== Knights Commander of St Michael and St George (KCMG) ====
Diplomatic division

- Graham Stuart Burton, CMG, British High Commissioner, Abuja.
- John Robertson Young, CMG, lately Chief Clerk, Foreign and Commonwealth Office.

==== Companions of St Michael and St George (CMG) ====
Civil division

- Peter Freemantle Berry. Chairman, Crown Agents for Overseas Governments and Administrations Ltd. For services to Humanitarian Aid.
- Susan Margaret Scholefield. Lately head, Balkans Secretariat, Ministry of Defence; (Kent).
- James Francis Wall. Head of Shipping Policy 3 Division, Department of the Environment, Transport and the Regions; (Hampshire).

Diplomatic division

- Michael John Canning, Deputy Director, Government Communications Headquarters.
- Dr Frances Gertrude Claire D'Souza. For services to human rights.
- Stewart Graham Eldon, OBE, lately Foreign and Commonwealth Office.
- Lieutenant General Sir John Martin Carruthers Garrod, KCB, OBE, lately Head of the Office of the High Representative of the European Union in Mostar, former Yugoslavia.
- John Henry Gary Gerson, Counsellor, Foreign and Commonwealth Office.
- Jean Francois Gordon, HM Ambassador, Algiers.
- John Illman, HM Ambassador, Lima.
- Hywel Ceri Jones, lately Deputy Director-General, European Commission.
- Professor Geoffrey Lewis Lewis. For services to Turkish studies.
- Alan Phillips. For services to human rights.
- Nigel Elton Sheinwald, lately Counsellor, Foreign and Commonwealth Office.
- Alen Gregg Webster, Director, Development and Training Services, British Council.
- Nicholas James Westcott, Counsellor, Foreign and Commonwealth Office.
- Miss Elizabeth Susan Wilmshurst, lately Legal Counsellor, UK Mission to the United Nations, New York.

=== Royal Victorian Order ===
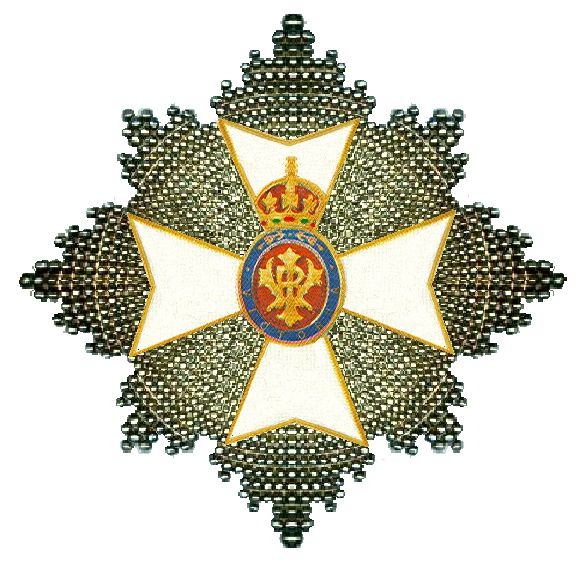
Breast Star of the Grand Cross of the Royal Victorian Order

The Royal Victorian Order is a dynastic order of knighthood and a house order of chivalry recognising distinguished personal service to the reigning monarch of the Commonwealth realms; admission remains in the personal gift of the monarch.

==== Knights Grand Cross of the Royal Victorian Order (GCVO) ====
- Savile Crossley, 3rd Baron Somerleyton, KCVO, lately Master of the Horse.

==== Knights/Dames Commander of the Royal Victorian Order (KCVO/DCVO) ====
- Deborah Vivien Cavendish, Duchess of Devonshire, trustee of the Royal Collection Trust.
- Edward Henry Kenelm Digby, 12th Baron Digby, JP, Lord Lieutenant of Dorset.
- Colonel Sir Ralph Harry Carr-Ellison, TD, Lord Lieutenant of Tyne and Wear.
- Patrick John Holmes Sellors, LVO, Surgeon Oculist to the Queen.

==== Commanders of the Royal Victorian Order (CVO) ====
- Commander Michael Bernard Shepley Higham, RN, lately Grand Secretary of the United Grand Lodge of England.
- Peter Nevile Wake Jennings, Serjeant-at-Arms of the House of Commons of the United Kingdom.
- John Richard Sclater, member of the Council of the Duchy of Lancaster.

==== Lieutenants of the Royal Victorian Order (LVO) ====
- John Leveson-Gower Ablitt. Member of The Prince's Trust-Bro.
- Cherrill Diana Auton, MVO. Sales Ledger Administrator, Royal Household.
- Robin Orr Blair. Purse Bearer to the Lord High Commissioner.
- Edward George Fancourt, MVO, RVM. Lately Senior Conservator, Royal Collection.
- Sheena Mary Fergus, MVO. Secretary to the Master of the Household.
- Canon George Rumney Hall. Domestic Chaplain to The Queen at Sandringham.
- Neil Martin Hansford. Treasury Accountant, HM Treasury.
- Capt David Percy Langley Hodgetts. Lately secretary to the Lieutenant Governor of Guernsey.
- Canon Michael Mervlyn Hamond Moore. Chaplain, Chapel Royal, Hampton Court Palace.
- Jane Mary Elizabeth Holderness-Roddam. Lady in Waiting to The Princess Royal.
- John Barry Bingham Stewart, OBE. High Constable of Holyroodhouse.

==== Members of the Royal Victorian Order (MVO) ====
- Emmanuel Oribi Amadi. Lately director of Fundraising, The Prince's Trust.
- Pamela Alice Bishop. Personnel director and administrator, Government House, Canberra.
- Sarah Lucy Georgina Goodall. Secretary, The Prince of Wales's Household.
- George Hassall. Business Liaison director, Rover Group Limited.
- Gail Elizabeth Johnson. Financial Controller, Royal Collection.
- Sgt Christopher John Larnder. Royalty Protection Department, Metropolitan Police.
- Maj Andrew Charles Burrell MacEwan. Lately Temporary Equerry to Queen Elizabeth The Queen Mother.
- Alexandra Gay McCreery. Secretary to the private secretary to The Duke of Edinburgh.
- John Simon McGivern. Managing director, UniTech Complete Computing.
- Gillian Lesley Middleburgh. Chief Clerk, Private Secretary's Office.
- Jeanie Elizabeth Moore. Lately vice-chairman of the Devonshire Committee of The Prince's Trust.
- Jonathan Anthony Skan. Lately assistant private secretary to The Prince of Wales.
- John Alexander Spens. R.D., Albany Herald of Arms.
- Beverley Ann Wilson. Clerk to the Lieutenancy, City of Edinburgh.

=== Royal Victorian Medal ===
==== Royal Victorian Medal (Gold) ====
- Raymond Frederick Bridges, RVM. Lately Motor Mechanic, Sandringham Estate.

==== Bar to the Royal Victorian Medal (Silver) ====
- Graham John Harrod, RVM. Lately Painter, Sandringham Estate.

==== Royal Victorian Medal (Silver) ====
- Barry Russell Ambrose. Tractor Driver, Crown Estate, Windsor.
- Robert Paul Bigsby. Deputy chief steward, Royal Train.
- Div Sgt Maj Walter Harry Bint. The Queen's Body Guard of the Yeomen of the Guard.
- Constable Stephen Charles Bryant. Royalty Protection Department, Metropolitan Police.
- Constable Joseph Kevin Carlin. Royalty Protection Department, Metropolitan Police.
- Richard George Cottrell. Driver, Gardens Department, Crown Estate, Windsor.
- Joseph Walter Frank Day. Lately Royal Mews, Buckingham Palace.
- Constable Paul George Gillender. Royalty Protection Department, Metropolitan Police.
- Div Sgt Maj Charles Thomas Hugh Hazell, BEM. The Queen's Body Guard of the Yeomen of the Guard.
- Margaret Elsie Hollis. Housemaid, Government House, Adelaide.
- Raymond Claud Cyril Mootoo. Electrician, Buckingham Palace.
- Stephen Michael Soulard. Senior Gardener, Kensington Palace.
- Agnes Annie Watt Stewart. Lady's Maid, Household of the Lord High Commissioner.
- Div Sgt Maj Ronald David Walkerdine. Lately The Queen's Body Guard of the Yeomen of the Guard.

=== Order of the British Empire ===
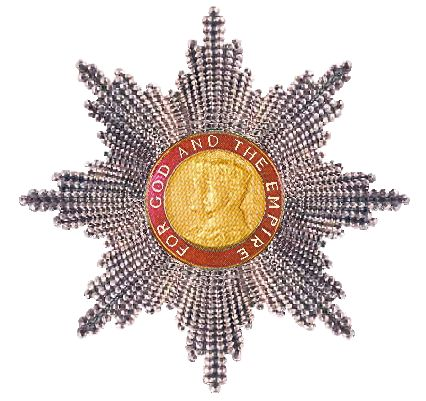
Grand Cross's star of the Order of the British Empire

The Most Excellent Order of the British Empire is an order of chivalry comprising five classes in civil and military divisions. It is the junior of the British orders of chivalry, and the largest, with over 100,000 living members worldwide. The highest two ranks of the order, the Knight/Dame Grand Cross and Knight/Dame Commander, admit an individual into knighthood or damehood allowing the recipient to use the title Sir or Dame.

==== Knights Grand Cross of the Order of the British Empire (G.B.E.) ====
Military division

Royal Navy

- Admiral Sir Peter Abbott, KCB

==== Knights/Dames Commander of the Order of the British Empire (KBE/D.B.E.) ====
Military division

Army

- Lieutenant General Edmund Fortescue Gerard Burton, OBE, late Royal Regiment of Artillery.

Civil division

- Pauline Fielding. Director of Nursing, Preston Acute Hospitals Trust and Chorley and South Ribble NHS Trust. For services to nursing.
- John Eaton Holmes, CMG, CVO. Principal private secretary to the Prime Minister. For services to peace in Northern Ireland.
- Margaret Helen Elizabeth Seward, CBE. President, General Dental Council. For services to the dental profession.
- Helena Shovelton. For services to the Citizens Advice Bureau Movement and for public service.

Diplomatic and Overseas

- Diana Clavering, Mrs Collins. For services to human rights in Southern Africa.
- Professor Nigel Rodley. For services to human rights and international law.

==== Commanders of the Order of the British Empire (CBE) ====
Military division

Royal Navy

- Commodore Barry Leighton, Royal Navy.
- Commodore Andrew William Netherclift, OBE, Royal Navy.

Army

- Colonel Timothy William Burls, MC (491132), late The Parachute Regiment.
- Brigadier Michael Ivan Laurie, (488459), late Intelligence Corps.
- Colonel Peter John Tyler Maggs, OBE (493747), late The Royal Logistic Corps.
- Brigadier Derek Michael O'Callaghan, (480371), late 16th/5th The Queen's Royal Lancers.
- Brigadier Christopher Keith Price (481258), late 14th/20th King's Hussars.

Air Force

- Group Captain Anthony John Batchelor, Royal Air Force.
- Air Commodore Christopher Forrest Cooper, Royal Air Force.

Civil division

- Robin Andrew. SCS, Ministry of Defence. (London)
- Carol Andrews. Detective Sergeant, Metropolitan Police. (Middlesex)
- Peter Hill Bagnall, DL. For services to the community in Oxford. (Bampton, Oxfordshire)
- Muriel Mary Barker. Leader, North East Lincolnshire Council. For services to the community in Grimsby and North East Lincolnshire. (Grimsby, Lincolnshire)
- Robert Barnes. Lately director, Social Survey Division, Office for National Statistics. (Cilgerran, Dyfed)
- Paul Stuart Barron. Senior vice president, ALSTOM Gas Turbines Ltd. For services to the gas turbine industry. (Lincoln, Lincolnshire)
- Patrick Alphonsus Bradley, OBE. For services to the electoral process. (Londonderry, Northern Ireland)
- Clayton Mark Brendish. Chairman, Admiral plc. For services to the information technology industry and to the Chancellor of the Duchy of Lancaster's Executive Agencies. (Ascot, Berkshire)
- Trevor David Brooking, MBE. For services to sport. (Essex)
- Professor Susan Jocelyn Bell Burnell. Professor of Physics, Open University. For services to astronomy. (Milton Keynes, Buckinghamshire)
- Anthony Victor Carey. Principal director, Contracts/Ordnance, Ministry of Defence. (Surrey)
- Professor Alan Carrington, FRS. Royal Society Research Professor, University of Southampton. For services to academic chemistry. (Hampshire)
- Jeremy P Carver. For services to international law. (London)
- Margaret Ann Charrington. Chairman, Horticultural Development Council. For services to horticultural research. (Matfield, Kent)
- Colin Nicholas Clark. Chief executive, Vickers Defence Systems. For services to the defence industry. (Northumberland)
- Freda Mary Cocks, OBE. For services to the community, especially health care, in Birmingham. (Birmingham, West Midlands)
- David Gerald Compston. Chairman, Manchester Training and Enterprise Council. For services to Training and Enterprise. (Nr Kirkby Lonsdale, Cumbria)
- Professor Roger Stanley Crofts. Chief executive, Scottish Natural Heritage. For services to environmental management. (Edinburgh)
- Sean Curran, OBE. For public service. (Belfast, Northern Ireland)
- Jonathan Stephen Day. Director, Defence Policy, Ministry of Defence. (London)
- Professor Richard Deacon. Sculptor. For services to Sculpture. (London, SE22)
- Professor John Ashton Dodge. For services to children's health. (Harpenden, Hertfordshire)
- Professor George Hill Elder. Head, Department of Medical Biochemistry University of Wales College of Medicine, Cardiff. For services to Medicine. (Llanishen, Cardiff)
- Margaret Elizabeth Farquhar. Lord Provost, Aberdeen City Council. For services to Local Government. (Aberdeen, Aberdeenshire)
- Professor Mark William James Ferguson. For services to the Health and Life Sciences Foresight Panel.
- Professor Janet Finch. For services to social science. (Keele, Staffordshire)
- Professor Richard Bailey Flavell, FRS. Lately director, John Innes Centre. For services to Plant and Microbial Science. (London)
- Professor Robert Harold Fryer. Lately Principal, Northern College for Residential Adult Education. For services to community education. (Sheffield, South Yorkshire)
- Clive Daniel Gillinson. Managing director, London Symphony Orchestra. For services to music. (London, N10)
- Professor Kevin Joseph Michael Gournay. For services to Psychiatric Nursing, Research and Education. (Cheshunt, Hertfordshire)
- Ronald Harwood. Playwright. For services to drama and to literature. (London, SW10)
- Graham Alfred Hawker. Group chief executive, Hyder plc. For services to industry in Wales. (Abergavenny, Monmouthshire)
- John Garry Hawkes. Chairman, Gardner Merchant. For services to tourism and to the catering industry. (Haywards Heath, West Sussex)
- Nigel John Mytton Hawkes. Science Editor, The Times. For services to the newspaper industry and to science. (Woodchurch, Kent)
- Frederick Alexander Heddell. Chief executive, MENCAP. For services to people with learning disabilities. (Harston, Cambridgeshire)
- Lenny Henry. Comedian and writer. For services to comedy drama and to Comic Relief.
- Professor John Robert Hills. For services to social security analysis. (London, N5)
- Elspeth Rosamund Morton, Lady Howe of Aberavon. For services to the advancement of women.
- Robert Valentine Hughes. For services to local government and to the community in Kirklees, West Yorkshire. (Kings Thorn, Herefordshire)
- Brian Gammell Ivory. Chairman, Highland Distillers plc. For services to the Scotch whisky industry and to the arts (by Blairgowrie, Perth and Kinross).
- Frank Charles Jenkins. Lately Accountancy Adviser, Company Law Directorate, Department of Trade and Industry. (Fetcham, Surrey)
- Joel Goodman Joffe. For charitable services (Swindon, Wiltshire)
- James George Kane, DL. Member, Northamptonshire County Council and Corby Borough Council. For services to the community in Northamptonshire (Corby, Northamptonshire)
- Professor John David Michael Henry Laver. Professor of Phonetics, University of Edinburgh For services to phonetics (Edinburgh)
- Professor William Robert Lee. Lately Professor of Ophthalmic Pathology, University of Glasgow. For services to ophthalmology (Milngavie, Dunbartonshire)
- Robert Ferguson Lees. Lately regional procurator Fiscal, Lothian and Borders, Crown Office and Procurator Fiscal Service. (Edinburgh)
- Walter Kenneth Lindsay. For public service. (Belfast, Northern Ireland)
- Maureen Diane Lipman. Actress and Writer. For services to comedy drama. (London)
- William Alexander Macgregor. Lately Chief Agricultural Officer, Agriculture, Environment and Fisheries Department, Scottish Office. (St Andrews, Fife)
- John Lionel Madden. For services to library and information services in Wales. (Aberystwyth, Ceredigion)
- Michael Peter Maine. Lately Group Technical Director, BAA. For services to public transport and to the airport industry. (Maidenhead, Berkshire)
- David Arthur Mallen. County Education Officer, East Sussex County Council. For services to education. (London, SE3)
- Professor Colin Nicholas Jocelyn Mann. Director, Warburg Institute, University of London. For services to Renaissance studies. (London, N1)
- Professor Averil Olive Mansfield. Professor of Surgery, Imperial College, St. Mary's Hospital, London. For services to surgery and to women in medicine. (London, W2)
- John Anthony Markland. Chief executive, Fife Council. For services to local government. (Cleish, Perth and Kinross)
- Michael John Paul Marks. Executive chairman, Merrill Lynch, Europe, Middle East and Africa. For services to the finance industry. (London, N6)
- Maxwell Clive Marsh. Director physics research, AWE Aldermaston. For services to the defence industry. (Berkshire)
- James Mason, DL. Chairman, Enterprise plc. For services to regeneration in North West England. (Lancaster, Lancashire)
- Professor Andrew Miller. Principal, University of Stirling. For services to higher education. (Edinburgh)
- Robert McDowall Murdoch. Headteacher, Earnock High School, Hamilton, South Lanarkshire. For services to improving the quality of Education. (Lanark, Lanarkshire)
- Ronald John Baillie Neil. Lately chief executive, BBC Production. For services to broadcasting. (Richmond, Surrey)
- Robin Alaster Nicholson. For services to architecture. (London, N5)
- Desmond O'Brien, OBE, QPM. For services to the British Transport Police. (Northamptonshire)
- Turlogh Patrick O'Brien. Director, Ove Arup Partnership. For services to Innovation in the Construction Industry. (London, W2)
- Derek Edwin Oddy. Divisional director, Project Services Directorate, Highways Agency, Department for the Environment, Transport and the Regions. (Birmingham, West Midlands)
- Iona Margaret Balfour Opie. For services to the Study of Children's Literature and Childhood. (Liss, Hampshire)
- Stephen Michael Orchard. Chief Executive, Legal Aid Board. For services to Legal Aid. (Dorset)
- Dennis Frederick Parrett. Lately Deputy director, Board of Inland Revenue. (Berkshire)
- Gareth Peirce. For services to justice. (London, NW1) (Note: Peirce later wrote to Downing Street asking for the honour to be withdrawn, and tendered an apology for the misunderstanding.)
- George Norman Phipson. Headmaster, West Hatch High School, Essex. For services to the Association of Headteachers of Grant Maintained Schools. (London, SE3)
- George Henry Poste, FRS. Chief Science and Technology Officer, SmithKline Beecham plc. For services to the development of Biosciences. (Hertfordshire)
- Peter Clifford Rainbird. Chairman, Essex Training and Enterprise Council. For services to the Construction Industry and to Training. (Woodbridge, Suffolk)
- Craig Collins Reedie. Chairman, British Olympic Association. For services to sport. (Bridge of Weir, Renfrewshire)
- Professor Michael Schofield. Chairman, Dorset Community NHS Trust. For services to the NHS. (Nr. Blandford Forum, Dorset)
- Richard Gordon Scriven, JP. Chief Commoner, Corporation of London. For services to local government. (Forest Row, East Sussex)
- Anthony Lawrence Sell. For services to the British Tourist Authority. (London, W4)
- Ann Forrest Shaw. For services to occupational health and safety. (Co Armagh, Northern Ireland)
- Paul Welton Shepherd, DL. Group chairman and managing director, Shepherd Building Group Ltd. For services to the Construction Industry. (York, North Yorkshire)
- Maurice Slapak. For services to transplant patients and to the British and World Transplant Games. (Itchen Abbas, Hampshire)
- Arthur Edward Smith, OBE. Chairman, Lincolnshire Trust for Nature Conservation. For services to nature conservation. (Alford, Lincolnshire)
- Bruce Gordon Smith, OBE. Chairman, Smith Institute for Industrial Mathematics and System Engineering. For services to technological innovation. (Cobham, Surrey)
- Ranjit Sondhi. For services to community relations. (Birmingham, West Midlands)
- Professor Richard Rustom Kharsedji Sorabji. Professor of Ancient Philosophy, King's College, London. For services to ancient philosophy. (Oxford, Oxfordshire)
- Anthony James Speed. Assistant Commissioner, Metropolitan Police. (London)
- Clare Mary Joan Spottiswoode. Lately director general of gas supply. For services to the gas industry and to consumers. (London)
- Peter Gregory Spurgeon. Chief executive, Criminal Injuries Compensation Authority, Home Office. (London)
- Sir Michael Strang Steel, Bt, DL. Forestry Commissioner. For services to forestry. (Selkirk, Selkirkshire)
- Lynette Ann Stone. Nursing and quality development manager, dermatology, Guy's and St Thomas's Hospital Trust, London. For services to dermatological nursing. (London, N1)
- William Ian Stuttle. Collector, South East England, HM Board of Customs and Excise. (Kent)
- Jane Tewson. Founder, Charity Projects. For innovation in charitable fund Raising. (Aylesbury, Buckinghamshire)
- Elizabeth, Lady Toulson. For services to the Women's Royal Voluntary Service. (Guildford, Surrey)
- Sydney William Treadgold. For services to the Financial Reporting Council. (Wokingham, Berkshire)
- George Ian Turnbull. Headteacher, Francis Askew Primary School, Kingston-upon-Hull. For services to education. (North Humberside, East Riding of Yorkshire)
- E Michael Walker. Chairman, Walker Group Ltd. For services to Lothian and Edinburgh Enterprise. (Edinburgh)
- James Nicol Walker, DL. Joint Managing Director, Walkers Shortbread Ltd. For services to the Food Industry. (Aberlour, Banffshire)
- David Leonard West. Head, Post Compulsory Division, OFSTED. (Tunbridge Wells, Kent)
- John Llewellyn Williams. For services to the dental profession and to surgery. (Chichester, West Sussex)
- Graham Peter Arthur Winyard. Director, Health Services, NHS Executive, Department of Health. (Winchester, Hampshire)
- Elizabeth Ann Wolstenholme. Head, Continuing Health Services, Department of Health. (Bradford, West Yorkshire)

Diplomatic and Overseas

- The Honourable Ernest David Decouto, JP, Speaker, House of Assembly, Bermuda.
- Dr Samuel Wilson Hynd. For services to medical missionary work in Africa.
- Roger George Moore. For charitable services, especially to UNICEF.
- Patrick Blackwell Paul. For services to British commercial interests in Hong Kong.

==== Officers of the Order of the British Empire (OBE) ====
Military division

Royal Navy

- Commander Philip Norman Harris, Royal Navy.
- Major (now Lieutenant Colonel) Stephen Thomas Hartnell, Royal Marines.
- Commander William Richard John Hockin, Royal Navy.
- Commander Keith Howell, Royal Navy.
- Commander David James Mattick, Royal Navy.
- Commander Richard Michael Simmonds, Royal Navy.
- Commander Geoffrey Charles Thomas, Royal Navy.

Army

- Lieutenant Colonel Richard Grant Bird, The Royal Logistic Corps.
- Acting Colonel Derek Henry Bristow, Cambridgeshire Army Cadet Force.
- Lieutenant Colonel John James Cargill, Scots Guards.
- Lieutenant Colonel Julian Edward Michael Crowe, Scots Guards.
- Lieutenant Colonel (Acting Colonel) Anthony Duncan Harkin, Corps of Royal Engineers.
- Lieutenant Colonel Ian Frazer Greaves Henderson, Intelligence Corps.
- Lieutenant Colonel Hugh Alastair Kemp, Corps of Royal Electrical and Mechanical Engineers.
- Lieutenant Colonel Alasdair William Buist Loudon, The Black Watch.
- Lieutenant Colonel John Macdonald, Royal Corps of Signals.
- Lieutenant Colonel Michael Charles Parish, MBE, The King's Regiment.
- Lieutenant Colonel Michael Geddes Paterson, Corps of Royal Engineers.
- Lieutenant Colonel Anthony Michael Furniss Potter, The Royal Irish Regiment.
- Lieutenant Colonel David Evan Price, Corps of Army Music.
- Lieutenant Colonel David Charles Stevens, Corps of Royal Engineers.

Air Force

- Squadron Leader Terence Raymond Adcock
- Wing Commander James Patrick Anderson
- Group Captain Andre Ferdinand Paul Dezonie
- Wing Commander John Stuart Hocknell, MBE
- Wing Commander Manharlal Ratanjibhai Patel
- Group Captain John Maurice Maynard Ponsonby
- Wing Commander Peter York

Civil division

- Graham Frederick Addicott, lately London Crown Courts Group Manager, Lord Chancellor's Department.
- Ian Scott Anderson, Community Investment Director, Whitbread pic. For services to Volunteering.
- John Anderson, lately Chairman, Wise Group. For services to Training for Unemployed People.
- Miss Susan Maria Andi, Poet and Live Artist. For services to Black Arts.
- John Dorrington Apthorp. For charitable services in Barnet, London.
- Professor Rosemary Doreen Ashton, Professor of English, University College, London. For services to Comparative Literature.
- Geoffrey Crabtree Atkinson, Director, Ben-Motor and Allied Trades Benevolent Fund. For charitable services to the Motor Industry.
- Paul Geoffrey Ayscough, Communications and Information Industries Directorate, Department of Trade and Industry.
- John Peter Basgallop, General Manager, BT Special Services. For services to the Telecommunications Industry.
- Graeme John Baker, Director of Construction Industry Affairs, Building Services Research and Information Association. For services to the Construction Industry.
- Samuel David Baker, JP, DL For services to the Administration of Justice in Somerset.
- Constance Barbara, Mrs Ballinger, lately Consultant Psychiatrist, Royal Dundee Liff Hospital. For services to Women's Psychiatric Health.
- Kenneth Bernard Barnes. For services to the Confederation of British Industry in the East Midlands.
- Joseph Bell. For services to Sea Cadet Corps.
- Margaret Ann, Mrs Bell, Director of Nursing and Quality, Mid Kent Healthcare Trust. For services to Nursing.
- Joseph Blair, Officer in Charge, HM Board of Inland Revenue.
- Jennifer Edith, Mrs Borden. For services to Christian Aid.
- Eric Findlater Brandie, Manager, Health, Safety and Environmental Affairs, Tengizchevroil. For services to Safety in the Offshore Oil Industry.
- Nicholas Denison Brighouse. For services to the Mini Olympics Mentally Handicapped Bi-annual Games and to Burns Victims.
- Miss Sheila Margaret Brock, lately Campaign Director, Museum of Scotland.
- Neil Hedley Buckland. For services to Thalidomide Trust.
- Christopher Colin Bulman, lately County Surveyor and Deputy Director, Development Services, Staffordshire County Council. For services to Transport and to the community in Staffordshire.
- Charles Burton, Detective Inspector, Derbyshire Constabulary. For the development of Screening and Profiling Techniques in homicide and abuse cases.
- Henry Percy James Butcher, lately Chief Executive, West Wales Ambulance NHS Trust. For services to Nursing and to the NHS in Wales.
- Michael Calvert, General Manager, CWS Agriculture. For services to the Agriculture Industry.
- George Winston Cameron, Managing Director, V. T. International Services Group. For Services to British Shipbuilding.
- Robert Carlyle, Actor. For services to Drama.
- Ronald Louis Carter, Furniture Designer. For services to Craft and Design.
- Hugh Chambers. For services to the St. John Ambulance Brigade in London.
- John Paul Clarke, lately Level D, Crown Prosecution Service.
- Brigadier Roland Maurice Cockman. For services to Graduate Recruiters.
- Professor Leonard Robert Morrison Cocks, TD, lately Keeper of Palaeontology, Natural History Museum. For services to Palaeontology.
- Roger Alan Victor Coles, Headteacher, Oxted County School, Surrey. For services to Education.
- Anne, Mrs Collingwood, Headteacher, Crook Primary School, Durham. For services to Primary Education.
- Terence George Collins, Chairman, VT Southern Careers Ltd. For services to the Provision of Careers Advice.
- Alan Collinson, Director, Collinson Systems Ltd. For services to the Defence Industry.
- George Alan Cooper. For services to Civil Engineering.
- Jennifer Anne, Mrs Cooper. For services to Young Women's Christian Association.
- Miss Harriet Copperman, Nursing Director, North London Hospice Home Care Service. For services to Palliative Care.
- George Francis Coulson, Business Manager, Fraud and Intelligence Service, HM Board of Customs and Excise.
- Miss Elizabeth Mary Cratchley, Chairman, Anti-Counterfeiting Group. For services to the Protection of Intellectual Property.
- Kenneth Thomas Cregreen, Head of Facilities and Support Services Division, Lord Chancellor's Department.
- David Mills Crompton. For services to the Construction Industry and to Urban Regeneration.
- Roger John Cully, Business Manager, HM Board of Inland Revenue.
- Professor Peter Fearnley Dale, President, International Federation of Surveyors. For services to Surveying.
- Richard Glyn Davies, Headteacher, Mynyddbach Girls' Comprehensive School, Swansea. For services to Secondary Education.
- Professor Ravindra Kumar Dhir, Professor of Civil Engineering, University of Dundee. For services to Concrete Technology.
- Shelagh, Mrs Diplock. For services to Women's Rights.
- John Dobie, lately Acting Director of Education, City of Edinburgh Council. For services to the Local Authority Education Service.
- Thomas Dixon Connochie Dun, Hill Farmer. For services to the Sheep Farming Industry.
- Kevin Harry Dunion. For services to Friends of the Earth International.
- Professor Peter Douglas Dunn. For services to the development of Innovative Energy Technologies.
- Professor Peter Dunnill, Director, Advanced Centre for Biochemical Engineering, University College London. For services to Biochemical Engineering.
- Ian James Dussek, Director, Wells (Trinidad Lake Asphalt) Ltd. For services to Highways and to the Bitumen Industry.
- John Robert Edmunds, Crops Technical Officer, Intervention Board, Ministry of Agriculture, Fisheries and Food.
- Ann Eleri, Mrs Edwards, Consultant Anaesthetist, Wrexham Maelor Hospital. For services to the NHS and to Medical Education.
- Roger Clough Williams-Ellis. For services to Forestry in Wales.
- Professor Alfred Michael Emmerson. For services to the Department of Health's Microbiology Advisory Committee and to Infection Control.
- David Essex, Singer. For charitable services, especially to Voluntary Service Overseas.
- Ian Philip Evans, Headmaster, Bedford School. For services to the Qualifications and Curriculum Authority.
- Richard Daniel Exell, Policy Officer, Trades Union Congress. For services to People with Disabilities.
- Henri Herman Exton, QPM, Grade 7, Ministry of Defence.
- Miss Elizabeth Farrelly. For services to the National Association of Councils for Voluntary Service.
- Richard John Robert Feilden. For services to Architecture.
- Peter Felix. For services to Water Ski-ing.
- John Fielder, lately Grade 7, Ministry of Defence.
- Cecil Thomas Finn, MBE, lately President, Scottish Fishermen's Federation. For services to the Fishing Industry.
- Miss Marie Frances Therese Finnegan. For public service.
- Gary Denis Flather, QC. For services to the Legal Profession and to promoting Disability Awareness.
- Elizabeth Anne Lucy Forgan. For services to the Human Fertilisation and Embryology Authority.
- Captain Timothy Arthur Forster. For services to Horse Racing.
- Anthony Kenric Stapleton Franks. For services to the Royal Hospital for Neuro-disability and to the RNLI.
- Simon Richard Frost, Chief Executive, F.H. Ltd. For services to the Aerospace Industry.
- Jane, Mrs Fulford, Headteacher, Winton Primary School, Islington, London. For services to Education.
- Janette Braid, Mrs Gardner, lately Chairman, National Schizophrenia Fellowship Scotland. For service to people with schizophrenia.
- George Drysdale Goldie, Chairman, National Groups Committee, Institute of Advanced Motorists. For services to Road Safety.
- John Lyon Goodfellow, Chairman, Board of Management, Angus College. For services to Further Education and to promoting educational links with farms.
- John William Green, lately Group Technical Director, Anglian Water pic. For services to the Water Industry.
- Kenneth James Green, Estates Projects Team Manager, HM Board of Customs and Excise.
- Brian Edwin Grimwood, lately Senior Natural Resources Adviser, Department for International Development.
- John Anthony Hailey, Board Member, Humberside Training and Enterprise Council. For services to Training and to Investors in People.
- Rodger Baden Hake. For services to the Foresight ITEC Panel and to the British Computer Society.
- Jeffrey John Hamblin, Director, The Americas, British Tourist Authority. For services to Tourism.
- Hilary Ide Hammond. For services to Librarianship and Information Provision.
- Anthony David Maurice Hams, lately Head, Sustainable Development Unit, Local Government Management Board. For services to Sustainable Development.
- Kenneth Stewart Harrison, Head of Mining Policy Section, Health and Safety Executive, Department for the Environment, Transport and the Regions.
- Christopher Jackson Harvey, Headteacher, Hawarden High School, Flintshire. For services to Education.
- Alan Sydney Hoad, lately Head of Planning and Performance, Facilities Management Division, Department for Education and Employment.
- Gillian, Mrs Hollander, JP For services to the community in Hertfordshire.
- Philip Holmes, JP For services to the Independent Board of Visitors, Military Corrective Training Centre.
- Stephen Holt, Director, New Deal Project, Employment Service, Department for Education and Employment.
- Malcolm Graham Horlock, Grade 6, Welsh Office.
- Wing Commander Frederick David Hoskins. For services to the Soldiers', Sailors' and Airmen's Families Association in Wiltshire.
- Richard Houlden, Headteacher, Hirst High School, Ashington, Northumberland. For services to Education.
- James Kingsley Hudson, Headteacher, Two Mile Ash Middle School, Milton Keynes. For services to Education.
- Miss Shirley Hughes. For services to Children's Literature.
- Professor Patrick Paul Anthony Humphrey, Director, Glaxo Institute of Applied Pharmacology. For services to Migraine Research.
- Professor David Stanley Ingram, lately Regius Keeper, Royal Botanic Garden, Edinburgh. For services to Plant Science and to Education.
- Gordon Richardson Irwin, JP For services to the Shipping Industry.
- Professor Patricia Ann Jacobs, FRS, Director, Wessex Regional Genetics Laboratory. For services to Genetic Research.
- David John James, Grade 6, Ministry of Defence.
- Peter Norman Jenkins, Grade 6, Defence Evaluation and Research Agency, Ministry of Defence.
- David John Johnson, Clerk of the Records, House of Lords.
- John Kenrick Jones, lately Grade 6, Ministry of Defence.
- Tom Jones, Singer. For services to Music and to Entertainment.
- William Stanley Jones, Chairman, Tyneside Training and Enterprise Council. For services to Training.
- Robert Kears, Grade 6, Contributions Agency, Department of Social Security.
- Donal Arthur John Keegan, DL, Consultant Physician. For services to Rehabilitation Services.
- George McRae Keil, Investigations Manager, Office of the Health Service Commissioner for Scotland.
- Ronald David Kells, DL For services to Banking and to the Community.
- Grace Doreen, Mrs Kempster, Head of Libraries, Information, Heritage and Cultural Services, Essex County Council. For services to Librarianship and Information Provision.
- David Maldwyn Thomas Kendrick, QPM, Commander, Metropolitan Police. For Services to the Police.
- Duncan Hamish Kenworthy, Producer and Managing Director, Toledo Pictures. For services to the Film Industry.
- David Andrew George Kilshaw, Chairman, Borders Health Board. For services to Health Care.
- Susan Jean, Mrs King, JP, Executive Director, Safer Merthyr Tydfil. For services to Crime Prevention.
- Ian Niven Kirby, Grade 6 (Business Manager), Metropolitan Police. For services to the Police and to the community.
- John Nigel Kirkland. For services to the community, especially the Derbyshire Ambulance Service, in Derbyshire.
- Margaret Heather, Mrs Laird. For services as a Church Commissioner.
- Charles Roy Lancaster. For services to Horticulture.
- Alan John Lawrence, lately Consultant in Dental Public Health, Department of Health.
- Peter James Little, Chief Executive, Birmingham Rathbone Society. For services to Training and Employment and to Young People.
- Pamela Edwards, Mrs Liversidge. For services to the Institution of Mechanical Engineers and to Engineering.
- Ronald Lober, Project Manager, Project Services Division, Highways Agency, Department of the Environment, Transport and the Regions.
- Jeremy Duncan Loom, Chief Executive, British Hospitality Association. For services to Tourism.
- Professor Donald Bernard Longmore. For services to Magnetic Resonance Scanning.
- Joan Katherine, Mrs Loudon. For services to the Administration of Justice in South Glamorgan.
- Ahmad Yusuf Lunat, Member, Kirklees Racial Equality Council. For services to Regeneration and to Racial Equality in Batley and Kirklees, West Yorkshire.
- Martin Roland Malpas, Regional Disability Services Manager, Employment Service, Department for Education and Employment.
- Miss Margaret Anne Marshall, Opera and Concert Singer. For services to Music.
- Leslie Catto McBain, Governor, HM Prison and Young Offenders' Institution Glenochil.
- Samuel McComas, Director and General Manager, Yarrow Shipbuilders Ltd. For services to the Use of Information Technology in Shipbuilding.
- John Jerome McCormack. For services to the Community.
- Malcolm McIver, lately Deputy Chairman, Accounts Commission for Scotland. For services to Local Government Finance.
- Professor David Sutherland McKay, Director, JVC Manufacturing UK Ltd. For services to Engineering Design.
- John McKinney, Clerk and Chief Executive, Omagh District Council. For Community Leadership.
- Judith McKnight, General Secretary, National Association of Probation Officers. For services to Employment Relations and to Women's Issues.
- Patricia Margaret, Mrs McManus, Health Visitor, Hawick and Chairman, Royal College of Nursing Scottish Board. For services to Health Care.
- John Boyd McMillan, Rector, Invergordon Academy. For services to Education.
- Joanna, Mrs McVey. For services to the Community.
- Stanley Albert Mendham, Founder and Chairman, Forum of Private Business. For services to Small Business.
- Malcolm Meredith, lately Grade 7, Driver Vehicle Licensing Agency, Department for the Environment, Transport and the Regions.
- Helen Jean, Mrs Millar, DL For services to the Advisory Committee on Novel Foods and Processes and to Consumer Interests.
- Brian Arthur Miller, Head of Marketing, Martin-Baker Aircraft Company Ltd. For services to Aircraft Escape Design and to Export.
- Denis George Gerard Moloney. For services to the community, especially Education and Health.
- Derek Raymond Moore, Director, Suffolk Wildlife Trust. For services to Nature Conservation, especially in Suffolk.
- Karen Jane, Mrs Morgan, lately Board Member, Environment Agency. For services to the Protection of the Water Environment.
- Miss Audrey Ennis Moser. For services to Child Welfare, especially Child Refugees.
- Terence Michael Mulroy, Director, Transportation Planning (International) Ltd. For services to Transport Planning.
- Alexander James Murphy. For services to Rugby League Football.
- Nicholas Jonathan Naftalin, Medical Director, Leicester Royal Infirmary. For services to Education and to Patient Care.
- Peter Geoffrey Nathan, DL For services to the London Playing Fields Society.
- Professor Elizabeth Newson. For services to Children with Autistic Spectrum Disorders.
- Professor Ian Newton, FRS, Head, Avian Biology Section, Institute of Terrestrial Ecology. For services to Avian Research.
- Diane Patricia, Mrs Nutting, Member, Council for the National Trust. For services to Conservation.
- Gerard Leo O'Donnell, Principal and Chief Executive, West Thames College, Middlesex. For services to Further Education.
- Denise O'Donoghue, Managing Director, Hat Trick Productions. For services to Television.
- Patrick Stephen O'Leary, lately Head, Single Market Unit, Department of Trade and Industry.
- John Packer, Chief Executive Officer, Norwich City Council. For services to the community in Norwich, Norfolk.
- Lyndsay, Mrs Hacket Pain. For services to the Associated Country Women of the World and to the Women's Institute.
- Christopher Andrew Frank Parsons, Constable, West Mercia Constabulary. For the development of the Safe Child Scheme.
- Eric Payne, Chairman, Mita Holdings Ltd., and Managing Director, Mita (UK) Ltd. For services to Industry and to the community in North Wales.
- Edward George Pearn, QFSM, HM Inspector of Fire Services (Grade II) HM Fire Service Inspectorate, Home Office.
- Marion Elizabeth Perry, lately Head, Prendergast Comprehensive School, Lewisham. For services to Education and to Guiding.
- Mark Trevor Phillips. For services to Broadcast Journalism.
- Hugh Shuter Platt, TD For services to Post Graduate Medical Education.
- Bishop Wilton Ralph Powell, Chairman, Nehemiah Housing Association and Chairman, Black Star Housing Association. For services to Housing in the West Midlands.
- David Graham Pyatt, Principal Scientific Officer, Forestry Commission.
- William Rose-Quirie, Governor 1, HM Prison Garth.
- George Raxster, DL, lately Chairman, Shropshire County Council. For services to Local Government and to the community in Shropshire.
- Rajkumar Raja Rayan, General Dental Practitioner, London. For services to Dentistry.
- The Reverend Nicholas John Read, Director, Rural Stress Information Network. For services to the Alleviation of Rural Stress.
- Mary, Mrs Reed, Chief Probation Officer, Norfolk Probation Service. For services to the Probation Service.
- Janet Hilary, Mrs Richardson, Technical Adviser, HM Board of Inland Revenue.
- Anthony Edward Richings, Secretary to the Bailiff of Guernsey. For services to Bailiwick of Guernsey.
- Anne Lloyd, Mrs Roberts, Deputy Chair, North Wales Health Authority. For services to the NHS and to Education in North Wales.
- Penelope Jill, Mrs Allisy-Roberts, Member, Ionising Radiations Advisory Committee. For services to Radiation Protection.
- Ann Edith, Mrs Robertson. For services to the East Kent Hospice Project.
- Grace Robertson. For services to Photography.
- William James Rodger, lately Principal Scientist, Strathclyde Police Forensic Science Laboratory. For services to Forensic Science.
- Lieutenant Colonel Alexander Hendrik Roosmalecocq, MC, Vice President, National Canine Defence League. For services to Animal Welfare.
- Miss Jennifer Ross, local Supervising Authority Midwifery Officer. For services to Women's Health Care in North East England.
- Thomas Mackenzie Ross. For services to the Pensions Industry.
- Clive John McLean Russell, DL For services to the Medical Profession.
- Bernard Ryan, lately Chief Executive, Land Authority for Wales. For services to Economic Development.
- John Ryan, Chair, Public Protection Committee, Local Government Association. For services to Public Safety and to Local Government.
- Frank Noel Ryding. For services to the British Red Cross Society, especially the Landmines Campaign.
- Iqbal Abdul Karim Mussa Sacranie. For services to Community Relations.
- Pearl, Mrs Sagar. For services to the Community and to Women's Issues.
- Rohit Samani, Managing Director, Tilda Ltd. For services to the Rice Milling Industry.
- Barbara Hilda, Mrs Scott, JP For services to the community in York.
- Christopher Scott, Governor 1, HM Prison Birmingham.
- John Fletcher Shepherd. For services to the Welfare of Severely Disabled People.
- Endon William Shipley. For services to the Royal Engineers Officers' Widows Society.
- Professor Jack Simmons, Historian. For services to Railway and Local History.
- Thomas Stewart Simpson. For services to the Council for the Advancement of Communication with Deaf People.
- Arun Kumar Singh, Partner, Commerce and Finance, Masons Solicitors. For services to Export and to Small Business.
- Patricia Frances, Mrs Smith, lately Deputy Chief Executive, Football Association. For services to the Football Association.
- Mary Westby, Mrs Soames, MBE For services to the ATS/WRAC Benevolent Fund.
- Ramniklal Chhanganlal Solanki. For services to Publishing and to the Asian Community.
- Miss Dusty Springfield. For services to Popular Music.
- Kenneth John Stacey. For services to the Chequers Trust and to the community in Buckinghamshire.
- James Keith Edward Stanford. For services to the Leonard Cheshire Foundation.
- The Reverend Canon John Alexander Stanley. For services to the Church of England and to the community in Huyton, Liverpool
- Miss Sally-Anne Stapleford, President, National Ice Skating Association. For services to Ice Skating.
- Ann Elizabeth, Mrs Stead, Clinical Director – Disability Services, Nuffield Orthopaedic Centre. For services to People with Physical Disabilities.
- John William Stephens, lately Head, Music Education Department, Trinity College of Music. For services to Music Education.
- Professor Malcolm Francis Graham Stevens, Professor of Experimental Cancer Chemotherapy, University of Nottingham. For services to the development of Cancer Drugs.
- Alison Jane, Mrs Stevenson, Grade 7, Ministry of Defence.
- William Anthony Keith Struthers, Director of Development Services and Deputy Chief Executive, City of Salford. For services to the Regeneration of Salford.
- Professor Eric Sunderland, DL For public service in Wales.
- Albert Victor Tait, Deputy Chief Executive, Convention of Scottish Local Authorities. For services to Local Government.
- Mary Elizabeth, Mrs Tanner. For services to Ecumenical Relations.
- Harry Taverner, lately Headteacher, Castle Rushen School, Isle of Man. For services to Education.
- Austin Joseph Tighe, Deputy Officer in Charge, HM Board of Inland Revenue.
- John George Tyror, JP, Member, Advisory Committee on the Safety of Nuclear Installations, Health and Safety Commission. For services to the Promotion of Safety in the Nuclear Industry.
- Professor Urlan Alistair Wannop. For services to the Boundary Commission for Scotland.
- Bernard Ward, Assay Master, Assay Office. For services to the Jewellery Industry in Birmingham.
- Elizabeth Jane, Mrs Wates. For charitable services to the community in Berkshire.
- Mavis Pauline, Mrs Watson, Clinical Nurse Specialist (Stoma Care), Bradford Hospitals NHS Trust. For services to Health Care.
- Professor Robin Gordon Maclennan Webster, Head, Scott Sutherland School of Architecture, Aberdeen. For services to Architecture Education.
- John Bernard Weeks, Section Head, Senior Civil Service Unit, Department of Health.
- Robin Andrew Williams, Chief Scientist, UK/EC Survey of the wreck of the MV Derbyshire. For services to Marine Investigation.
- Hugh Christopher Woodrow, lately Chief Executive and Secretary, Association of Consulting Engineers. For services to Consulting Engineering.
- Robin Edwin Peter Wright, JP For services to the Administration of Justice and to the community in Lincolnshire.

Diplomatic and Overseas

- David Atherton. For services to music in Hong Kong.
- Kathryn Board, Director, British Council, Colombia.
- Professor Robert Lumb Broadhead. For services to child health in developing countries, especially Malawi.
- Julian Maurice Clarke. For public, community and human rights services, British Virgin Islands.
- Richard William Tebutt Coe. For services to community projects in Jamaica.
- The Reverend Canon Colin Richard Chad Coussmaker. For services to British communities in the Diocese of Gibraltar in Europe.
- Professor Timothy Revill Cullinan. For services to community health in Malawi.
- Sister Judith Ellen Dean, MBE For services to youth and the community in Swaziland.
- Martin James Drake. For services to the European Monitoring Mission in former Yugoslavia.
- The Honourable Anthony Samuel Eden, M.L.A., JP For public, community and services in the Cayman Islands.
- Alexander Pratt Elder, Police Adviser, British Development Division in the Caribbean.
- David John Foster. For humanitarian services, particularly in Eastern Europe.
- Sonia Berta, Mrs Fuchs. For services to community welfare at home and overseas, latterly in Russia.
- Lieutenant Colonel Lionel Hugh Michael Gregory, MBE For services to Commonwealth youth.
- Brian Ralph Hall. For public service in Bermuda.
- Leslie Hemery. For services to voluntary community work in Chile.
- Thomas Victor Higgins. For services to British exports and to the welfare of the under-privileged in Pakistan.
- Anthony John Humphries, Senior Information Officer, Foreign and Commonwealth Office.
- Donald Paul Robert Jenner, First Secretary, Foreign and Commonwealth Office.
- Anthony Philip Lewis, Director, British Council, Saudi Arabia.
- Ariel Rudolph Misick. For public service, Turks and Caicos Islands.
- John Leslie Watson Noal. For services to British commercial interests in Bangladesh and to the British community in Chittagong.
- Roderick Stokes Pryde, lately Director, British Council Teaching Centre, Hong Kong.
- Roderick Allan MacGregor Ramsay, MBE For services to British-Indonesia trade and to the community.
- Dr George Remington. For services to public health in the Middle East.
- Michael William Guild Roberts, Headmaster, British School, Amsterdam.
- Elaine Margaret, Mrs Ruffell, First Secretary, Foreign and Commonwealth Office.
- Simon James Scarff, MBE For services to British industry, and community service in India.
- Professor Malcolm Philip Dominic Baker-Smith. For services to the promotion of English in the Netherlands.
- Professor David Patrick Southall. For services to childcare in Bosnia and Hercegovina.
- Maxine Janet, Mrs Vlieland, Organising Secretary, Keonigswinter Conferences.
- Edgar Wille. For services to management development in the Czech Republic and Slovakia.
- Colin John Wilson. For services to British-Japanese trade.
- Miss Barbara Janet Woodward, lately First Secretary, HM Embassy, Moscow.
- Ian Alan Worthington, lately HM Consul-General, Ekaterinburg.

==== Members of the Order of the British Empire (MBE) ====
Military division

Royal Navy

Army

- WO2 Class 2 Anthony Hawksworth. Adjutant General's Corps.
- Warrant Officer Class 2 Gary Hind. The Royal Welch Fusiliers.

Air Force

Civil division

- Stuart Wilson Aaron, Responsible Care Manager, Chemical Industry Association. For services to Energy Efficiency in the Chemicals Industry.
- Jack Abbott. For services to Disabled Ex-Servicemen in Manchester.
- Raficq Shaik Abdulla. For services to Community Relations.
- John Agnew, Member, Dumfries and Galloway Council. For services to the community in Leswalt, Stranraer.
- Beverley Phyllis, Mrs Akwaraonwu, Personal Assistant, Department of Health.
- James Alcock, Chairman, Fife Local Medical Committee. For services to General Practice and to Health Care.
- Gillian Mary, Mrs Alldridge, JP. For services to the Administration of Justice in Surrey.
- Arthur Andrew Anderson, Producer, "Landward", BBC, Aberdeen. For services to Agricultural Broadcasting.
- Max William Andrews, Commandant, Devon and Cornwall Special Constabulary. For services to the Police and to the community.
- Peter Harry Andrews, MC. For services to the Muscular Dystrophy Group, Solihull, West Midlands.
- Helen Birgit, Mrs Arkell. For services to the Helen Arkell Dyslexia Centre.
- Michael John Arthur, Technical Director, Institute of Quarrying. For services to Training in the Quarrying and Associated Industries.
- Margaret Alma, Mrs Ashby. For services to the WRVS in Luton, Bedfordshire.
- Barbara Joan, Mrs Astley, Foster Carer. For services to Fostering in Stafford.
- Roy Edward Astley, Foster Carer. For services to Fostering in Stafford.
- Robert Atkins, Member, Bromham Parish Council. For services to the community in N orth Bedfordshire.
- Ernest Joseph Atkinson, lately Director and General Manager, Armchair Passenger Transport Company Ltd. For services to the Coach Industry.
- Maurice Aurokium, Macebearer to the Lord Mayor of Westminster. For services to the community.
- Geoffrey George Ayton. For services to the community, especially People with Disabilities, in Welwyn Garden City, Hertfordshire.
- Robert Stanley Badham, Research Technician, School of Chemical Engineering, University of Birmingham. For services to Science Education.
- Colonel James Henry Baker, Retired Officer 1, Ministry of Defence.
- Roger Keith Ball, Administrative Officer, Home Office.
- Roy Henry Barber, Museum Technician 2, Royal Air Force Museum, Ministry of Defence.
- Frederick Barker. For services to the Preston Senior Attendance Centre.
- Joy Margaret, Mrs Barlow, lately Assistant Director, Aberlour Childcare Trust. For services to prevention developments in Drug Misuse.
- Elizabeth Janet Preston, Mrs Barrett. For services to the St. Andrews Ambulance Association, Fort William.
- Clive George Barsi. For services to Young People and to Sport in Penydarren, South Wales.
- Robert David Baxter, Quality Assurance Co-ordinator, Land Rover. For services to the Defence Industry.
- John Mathieson Beattie, Associate (Highways) Construction Services, Cumbria County Council. For services to Road Construction.
- Miss Maureen Mary Bebb. For services to the BBC World Service.
- Ann Sylvia, Mrs Bell, Home Carer. For services to the community in Knodishall, Suffolk.
- Barbara Susan, Mrs Berryman, Headteacher, Marshfields Special School, Peterborough. For services to Education.
- Marjory, Mrs Bett, Prison Organist. For services to Prisoners' Welfare at HM Prison Aberdeen.
- Geoffrey William Bird. For services to People with Learning Disabilities in Exeter, Devon.
- Brian Peter Bissell, lately Headmaster, The Blue Coat School, Edgbaston, Birmingham. For services to Education.
- Gloria Lucia Giuditta, Mrs Bittante, Senior Waitress, Bertorelli's, London. For services to Tourism.
- Moorea, Lady Black, J.P. For services to the Administration of Justice in London.
- Robert John Blackball, Head of Design and Technology, Saltash Community School, Cornwall. For services to Education.
- Barbara, Mrs Blake, Pay Clerk, Department of Health.
- John David Blake, Chief Test Pilot, Marshall of Cambridge Ltd. For services to the Defence Industry.
- Janette, Mrs Bland. For services to the Hotel Industry and to Tourism in Wales.
- William Gerald Blaney. For services to the Fire Service.
- Alan William Blevins, Manager, Management Development Coaching, Automobile Association. For services to the Motoring Industry.
- Brenda Frances, Mrs Bonnert. For services to the Maidstone Hospital League of Friends, Kent.
- Malcolm Frank Booth. For services to Architecture.
- Richard Henry William Bouchard, Founder, Romford Drum and Trumpet Corps. For services to Music in Essex.
- Margaret, Mrs Bowie. For services to the community, especially Scouting, in Altrincham, Cheshire.
- Thomas Sealy Bown, Voluntary Observer, Meteorological Office, Anglesey.
- Miss Annie Elizabeth Boyle. For services to the community.
- Anne Beatrice Mary, Lady Brewis. For services to Nature Conservation in Hampshire.
- Richard Campbell Brickley. For services to Sport for Disabled People.
- Ronald George Francis Broadbent, Constable, Hertfordshire Constabulary. For charitable services to the community.
- Geoffrey Alan Brooks. For services to the Worshipful Company of Gun Makers and to Consumer Safety.
- Kathleen, Mrs Broughton, Organiser, WRVS Car Service. For services to Elderly People on Jersey.
- Miss Norma Mabel Broughton. For services to the community in Baston, Lincolnshire.
- Albert Brown. For services to the Rehabilitation of Offenders.
- Miss Cynthia Mary Brown. For services to the Institute of Export.
- Edward Brown, Bedellus, University of Strathclyde. For services to Student Welfare.
- Elizabeth Keen, Mrs Brown. For services to the community in Garnethill, Glasgow.
- Sally Elizabeth, Mrs Bryan, Hearing Impairment Special Support Assistant, Worcestershire Service for Children with Sensory Impairments. For services to Young People with Special Needs.
- Terry Brian Buckett, Postman. For services to the Post Office and to the community in Henley-on-Thames, Oxfordshire.
- Alan Keith Budd, lately General Medical Practitioner, Reading, Berkshire. For services to Health Care.
- David Raymond Burden, Auxiliary Coastguard in Charge, HM Coastguard, Wyke Regis, Dorset. For services to Marine Safety.
- Richard Cheyney Burden, Production Control Assistant, Remploy, Bristol. For services to the Employment of Disabled People.
- Paul Gerard Burdon, Administrative Officer, Government Office for the North West.
- Janie Burford, Director, Painshill Park Trust. For services to the Conservation of Historic Landscape.
- Margaret Joyce, Mrs Burgoyne. For services to the community, especially Young People, in Wigan, Lancashire.
- Doreen, Mrs Burley. For services to the Soldiers', Sailors' and Airmen's Families Association in Lancashire.
- Robert John Burry, DL, Official Verderer, New Forest. For services to Forestry.
- Charles Edward Burton. For services to Peak District Mountain Rescue.
- Janice Kay, Mrs Burton. For services to Sport, especially Swimming, for Visually Impaired People.
- John Graham Byers. For services to the community in Broughton, Cumbria.
- The Reverend Father John Caden. For services to the community in Sedgefield, County Durham.
- Thomas Joseph Calvert, lately Investigation Manager, HM Board of Inland Revenue.
- Douglas Anderson Cameron. For services to Radio Broadcasting.
- Ronald Paterson Cameron. For services to the Army Cadet Force in Cleveland.
- Ann, Mrs Campbell. For services to the Community, especially Meals on Wheels, in Camberley, Surrey.
- Michael John Cape, Waste Regulation Officer, Environment Agency, South Wessex. For services to Waste Regulation and to the Environment.
- Miss Elizabeth Smith Armstrong Carr, Senior Personal Secretary, Department of Trade and Industry.
- John Carruthers, Chairman, APEX Scotland. For services to the Rehabilitation of Offenders.
- David Alexander Carson. For services to the Police.
- Thomas John Sydney Carter. For services to the Royal Horse Artillery Association.
- Roger Dixon Cartwright, Senior Policy Adviser Latin America, British Petroleum Company pic. For services to Export.
- Colm Murray Cavanagh. For services to the Community and Reconciliation.
- Janet, Mrs Chaloner, Valuation Executive, HM Board of Inland Revenue.
- Dilbagh Singh Chana. For services to Community Relations in Baling.
- John Peter Chappell, lately Training and Development Officer, Boys' Brigade. For services to Young People in North West England.
- Raymond Cheeseman, Ambulanceman. For services to the Ambulance Service and to the St. John Ambulance Brigade in Sedbergh, Cumbria.
- Harry Joseph Cherrett. For services to the community in Pamphill, Dorset.
- Thomas George Cherry. For public service.
- Richard Waugh Chester, Director, National Youth Orchestra of Scotland. For services to Music.
- Nora Genevieve, Mrs Chute. For services to Breast Care Nursing.
- Miss Pamela Clabburn. For services to Textile Conservation in Museums and Galleries.
- Brenda Margaret, Mrs Clapperton, Honorary Secretary, Fareham Society. For services to the community in Fareham, Hampshire.
- John Clark. For services to the People Care Association, Southwark, London.
- Malcolm Thomas Clark, Senior Storekeeper, Ministry of Defence.
- Gillian Clarke. For services to Hockey and Hockey Umpiring.
- Patricia Ann, Mrs Clough. For services to the community in Frensham and Dockenfield, Surrey.
- Derek Roy Cocker, Secretary, Ipswich Dial-a-Ride. For services to Community Transport.
- Chloe Ann, Mrs Cockerill. For services to the Friends of St. Thomas' Hospital, London.
- Dorothea, Mrs Cockett. For services to the Friends of St. Thomas' Hospital, London.
- Helen Lorraine, Mrs Coe, Ward Manager, Frimley Park NHS Trust. For services to Quality in Nursing.
- Michael Nathan Cohen, Senior Probation Officer, Greater Manchester Probation Service. For services to the Chorlton Probation Hostel.
- William Thomas Collins. For services to Electrical Engineering.
- ~~Father Peter Conniffe, Chairman, Servite Houses. For services to Housing for Elderly People and those with Special Needs.~~
- Raymond William Cooke, JP, Secretary, T.&G.W.U., British Steel Tinplate, Trostre Works and Multi Union Secretary, British Steel Tinplate pic. For services to Industrial Relations.
- Captain Alan Stephen Cooper. For services to the community in Bingham, Nottinghamshire.
- Trevor Martin Cooper, Archive Conservator, Borthwick Institute of Historical Research, University of York. For services to Conservation.
- Myra Elmetha, Mrs Corbin, lately Messenger, Intervention Board, Ministry of Agriculture, Fisheries and Food.
- Kenneth Macrae Cordery. For services to the community in the West Country.
- Veronica Ann, Mrs Corlett, Headteacher, Llangattock, Church in Wales Primary School, Powys. For services to Education.
- Richard Corsie. For services to Bowls.
- David Barrie Coult. For services to the community, especially Young People, in Salisbury, Wiltshire.
- Gary Coupland, Performer, The Singing Kettle. For services to Children's Entertainment.
- Robert Kerr Cowan, Financial Adviser, Harmeny Education Trust Ltd. For services to Children with Social, Emotional and Behavioural Difficulties.
- Frederick Thomas Cowley, Chairman, T. & R. Holdings Ltd. For services to the Electrical Engineering Industry.
- Maxwell Arnold John Bradley Craven. For services to Local History in Derby.
- John Dalzell. For services to the Community.
- John Alexander Dalzell. For services to Tourism and to Amateur Golf.
- David Dando, E.R.D. For services to the Royal British Legion in Wales
- Grace, Mrs Daniel. For services to the Hounslow Community Health Council and to Disabled People.
- William Edward Daniel. For services to the Police.
- Joyce Eugenie, Mrs Daniels. For services to Community Relations in London and Surrey.
- Ian Darragh, Administration Officer, GEC Marine. For services to the Defence Industry.
- Miss Elizabeth Ann Daughton, Senior Personal Secretary, HM Board of Inland Revenue.
- Douglas James Davidson, lately Special Constable, Tayside Police. For services to the Police.
- Letitia Robina, Mrs Davidson. For public service.
- Evelyn Dorothy, The Reverend Mrs Davies. For services to people with cancer and to counselling.
- Judith Mary, Mrs Davies, Business Manager, Employment Service, Department for Education and Employment.
- Edward Francis Filby Davis. For services to the Talking Newspaper Association of the UK.
- Harry Graham Davis. For charitable services to the community in Poole, Dorset.
- Miss Jill Susan Davis, Senior Executive Officer, Ministry of Defence.
- Ralph Sidney Alfred Davison, Driver, Distribution Services, London Transport. For services to Public Transport.
- Ann, Mrs Dawe. For services to the community, especially Elderly People, in Amersham, Buckinghamshire.
- Margaret Hilary, Mrs Dawson. For services to the community in Amman Valley, West Wales.
- Peter Russell Dawson, lately Governor 5, HM Prison The Mount.
- Lakshmi Chandrani, Mrs de Zoysa, lately Head, Brent Language Services, Brent Local Education Authority. For services to Education.
- Lorna, Mrs Delanoy. For services to the Farmland Museum, Denny Abbey, Cambridgeshire.
- Michael Delanoy. For services to the Farmland Museum, Denny Abbey, Cambridgeshire.
- Arthur Delworth. For services to the British Limbless Ex-Servicemen's Association in Edinburgh.
- Barry Denton, Historian. For services to 17th Century History.
- Anne, Mrs Dessein, Administrative Secretary, English Department, British Institute. For services to Training.
- Ian Dewhirst. For services to Local History in Keighley, West Yorkshire.
- Banal Singh Dhindsa. For services to the community, especially Ethnic Minorities, in Gateshead, Tyne and Wear.
- Noreen, Mrs Dickinson, Principal, Noreen Dickinson School of Dance. For services to the community in Tameside, Lancashire.
- Peter Denis Dickinson. For public service.
- Kathleen Lilian, Mrs Dodkin. For services to the Army Training Regiment, Bassingbourn.
- Barbara Mae, Mrs Doherty, Headteacher, Landside Nursery School, Glasgow. For services to Nursery Education.
- David Dolan, Local Officer 1, Department of Social Security.
- Patricia Mary, Mrs Donald, General Medical Practitioner, Edinburgh. For services to Women's Health and to Paediatric Care.
- John Aubrey van Dongen, Trustee, Disabled Drivers' Association. For services to disabled people.
- Marjorie Vivienne, Mrs Donnelly. For services to the community in Manchester.
- Edwin Myer Doolan, Presenter, BBC Radio West Midlands. For services to Radio Broadcasting.
- Sheila, Mrs Down. For services to the Bellinge Lower School, Northampton.
- Henry Herbert Drew, Organiser, Sulmona POW Reunions. For services to Ex-Prisoners of War.
- Miss Neslyn Eugenie Watson-Druee, Executive Director, Beacon Organisational Development and Training Services. For services to the development of Nursing Leadership.
- James Gordon Duncan, Director of External Relations, Queen Margaret College. For services to Overseas Student Welfare.
- Michael Charles Dunkley, Surveyor, Northampton Debt Management Unit, HM Board of Customs and Excise.
- James Kennedy Dunn. For services to the community in Callander, Perthshire.
- Anthony Michael Durkin. For services to the community in the West Midlands.
- Michael Ralph Eaton, Scriptwriter and Film Maker. For services to the Film Industry.
- Hugh Brown Edmond, lately Regional Supervisor for Scotland, British Potato Council. For services to the Potato Industry.
- Heather Ann, Mrs Edmonds, lately Senior Community Education Worker, Suffolk County Council. For services to Young People.
- Maureen Margaret, Mrs Edmondson. For services to Bereaved Parents and to the Stillbirth and Neonatal Death Society in Sheffield, South Yorkshire.
- Frank Bywell Edwards, Volunteers Co-ordinator, Groundwork. For services to the community and to Regeneration in Leeds.
- Agnes Young, Mrs Ellacott, Civilian Chief Nursing Officer, Ministry of Defence.
- Michael James Ellett, Business Manager, Employment Service, Department for Education and Employment.
- Joseph John Elley. For services to the community in Dagenham, Essex.
- Tony Robert Ellingford, Founder Member, Supersavers Project, Perkins Engines Ltd. For services to Environmental Protection.
- Madge Callaghan, Mrs Elliot. For services to Lawn Tennis in Hawick, Roxburghshire.
- Robert Young Scott Elliot. For services to Lawn Tennis in Hawick, Roxburghshire.
- Hiram England. For services to the Farming community in Derbyshire.
- Daphne Joyce, Mrs Eenticknap. For services to Scouting in Surrey.
- Robert Macdonald Esden. For services to the Imperial Society of Knights Bachelor.
- Carol, Mrs Evans. For humanitarian services in Southern India.
- Gareth John Evans. For humanitarian services in Southern India.
- Glyn Evans. For services to the community in Llanedeyrn, Cardiff.
- Thomas Arwyn Evans. community in Gwynedd.
- Geoffrey Ellwood Fearn, Chairman, Long Bennington Parish Council. For services to the community in Long Bennington, Nottinghamshire.
- Ruth Helen, Mrs Fenn. For services to the Institute of Physics.
- Duncan Archibald Ferguson. For services to the Scottish Fisheries Museum Development Appeal.
- Keith Robert Ferguson, Distribution Manager, North Devon Engineering, South Western Electricity pic. For services to the Electricity Industry.
- Joseph Albert Fernandes, Storekeeper, Ministry of Defence.
- Charles Ferro, lately Senior Professional and Technology Officer, Ministry of Defence.
- Miss Cilia Fisher, Performer, The Singing Kettle. For services to Children's Entertainment.
- Henry Fletcher, JP For services to the Environment and to the Community.
- Lamont Forbes. For services to the community, especially the Guide Dogs for the Blind Association, in Fripckheim, Angus.
- Leslie Richard Ford. For services to the community in Mildenhall, Suffolk.
- Aubrey Ernest Forman. For services to the community in Worlingham, Suffolk.
- Shirley Edwards, Mrs Forster, Administrative Officer, Ministry of Defence.
- Trevor Foster, Bus Driver, Taylors Coaches. For services to Public Transport in West Yorkshire.
- Curtis Allister Allan Francis. For services to Community Relations in Croydon, Surrey.
- Angus Robert Charles Fraser. For services to Cricket.
- Sally, Mrs Freeborn, Assistant Director, Curriculum and Quality, Cornwall College. For services to Further Education.
- Sandra, Mrs Galloway. For services to the families of people with Creutzfeldt-Jacob Disease.
- Samuel Gamble, School Caretaker. For services to Education.
- Christopher James Gardiner, Divisional Officer, Hampshire Special Constabulary. For services to the Police.
- Rosalind Margaret, Mrs Garner, Administrative Officer, Department of Social Security.
- Christopher Coulsting Gay. For services to the community in Canterbury.
- Lucille, Mrs van Geest. For charitable services in Lincolnshire.
- Brian Philip George. For services to the Save the Children Fund in Buckinghamshire.
- Alison, Mrs Gibbons. For services to the community in Grimley, Hereford and Worcester.
- Arthur John Gibbs, lately Train Driver, Thameslink. For services to the Railway Industry and to the welfare of Railway Workers.
- Joan, Mrs Gibbs. For services to the community in Macclesfield, Cheshire.
- Katrine Mary, Mrs Gibson. For services to the Engineering and Physical Sciences Research Council and to the Multiple Sclerosis community.
- Wilfrid Gill. For services to the St. Loye's College Foundation, Exeter and to disabled people.
- John Glaser, President, Animals in Distress. For services to Animal Welfare.
- Phyllis, Mrs Glidewell. For services to the War Widows' Association.
- Miss Doris Ann Goodchild. For services to Illustration, particularly of Guide Books and to the Cause of Education.
- Barbara Raie, Mrs Goodman. For services to the community, especially the Manchester Adoption Society, in Manchester.
- Ronald John Gordon. For charitable services in Middlesbrough.
- Miss Ola Mary Gorie, Designer and Jewellery Manufacturer. For services to the Jewellery Industry.
- Peter Grenville Gowland. For charitable services to the community in Hartlepool.
- Miss Linda Greaves, Secretary, Newham Riding School and Association. For services to Horse Riding.
- Barry Green, lately Mayor's Secretary, London Borough of Sutton. For services to Local Government.
- Colin Michael Green, Environmental Adviser, Severn Trent Water. For services to the Environment.
- John Robert Green, Records Reviewer, Cabinet Office.
- Richard Stewart Greenwood, Member, Keighley and Worth Valley Light Railway. For services to Railway Preservation.
- Ralph Ernest Gregson, For services to the community in Southport, Merseyside.
- Isabel Maureen, Mrs Greig, JP For charitable services to the community in Thanet, Kent.
- Stanley Bryan Grieve, Retained Sub Officer, Dumfries and Galloway Fire Brigade. For services to the Fire Service.
- David Mark Griffiths, Senior Professional, Defence Evaluation and Research Agency, Ministry of Defence.
- Ronald Lloyd Griffiths. For services to the Pembrokeshire Voluntary Transport Association.
- Joyce Edith, Mrs Grigsby. For services to the Citizens Advice Bureau in Hemel Hempstead, Hertfordshire.
- Geoffrey Hadley, Chairman, Publications Committee, British Mycological Society. For services to the Study of Fungi.
- Miss Mary Doreen Haigh, Member, Hambleton District Council. For services to the community in North Yorkshire.
- Julia Persephone Hailes. For services to Green Consumerism.
- Victor Arthur Hain. For services to disabled people Overseas.
- John Samuel Frederic Hales. For services to the Waterloo Legal Advice Service, London.
- The Reverend Canon Peter Hubert Hallam. For services to the community in Briercliffe, Lancashire.
- Stanley Harold Halls, lately Chief Executive, Lead Sheet Association. For services to the Construction Industry.
- Naseem Hameed (Prince Naseem Hamed). For services to Boxing.
- Anthony John Hannaford, Fire Control Officer, Somerset Fire Brigade. For services to the Fire Service.
- Alison Margaret, Mrs Harbison. For services to Farming.
- Alan Charles Harbor, Driver, Metropolitan Police, For services to the Police.
- Roger John Harris, Planning Engineer, Project Services Group, BNFL, Magnox Generation Business. For services to the community in Gloucestershire.
- John Harrison. For services to Young People and to the community in Carmarthenshire.
- Patricia, Mrs Harrop. For services to Keep Fit and to the community on the Isle of Wight.
- Susan Mary, Mrs Hart. For services to the community, especially Young People with Needs, in Kirkby, Liverpool.
- Marion Joan, Mrs Harvey, Chairman, London Forum of Civic and Amenity Societies. For services to the Environment in London.
- Valerie Andrea, Mrs Harvey. For services to Elderly People in Talgarth, Powys.
- James Frederick Hawkes, Manpower Allocation and Security Manager, Devonport Management Ltd. For services to the Defence Industry.
- Elizabeth Joyce, Mrs Hay, Chairman, Voice of the Listener and Viewer. For services to Broadcasting.
- John Phorson Hay. For services to the community in Cockburnspath, Berwickshire.
- Dorothy, Mrs Hayes. For services to the WRVS in Liverpool.
- Geoffrey Alan Hebbern, Principal Prison Officer, HM Prison The Verne.
- Kenneth Hedley, Shepherd. For services to Blackface Sheep Farming.
- Geoffrey Haigh Hill, Senior Custodian, English Heritage. For services to the preservation of Peveril Castle, Derbyshire.
- Peter William Hilton, First Aid/Surgery Attendant, BNFL Fuel Business Group. For services to BNFL and to Health and Safety.
- Anthony Raymond Hines. For services to the community, especially the Brockham Bonfire, in Brockham, Surrey.
- Norma Elizabeth, Mrs Hiskey, Senior Personal Secretary, Scottish Office.
- Simon Hitchins, local Officer 1, Benefits Agency, Department of Social Security.
- Miss Jane Elizabeth Hodges. For services to Ecology in Pembrokeshire, West Wales.
- Lawrence Holland. For services to the community, especially the Society of St. Vincent de Paul, in Washington, Tyne and Wear.
- Patricia Ann, Mrs Holland, lately Cl, Cabinet Office.
- Ronald Sydney Hollis. For services to the Soldiers', Sailors and Airmen's Families Association in Chessington, Surrey.
- Michael Duncan Holmes, Janitor, Central Primary School, Inverness. For services to Primary School Children.
- Alan Hopper. For services to the British Fire Services Association.
- Miss Brenda Margery Horne, Team Leader in Thoracic Surgery and Pain Therapy, Bradford Hospitals NHS Trust. For services to Nursing in Operating Theatres.
- Keith Horrocks, Member, Inshore Lifeboat Crew, Blackpool Lifeboat. For services to Marine Safety.
- Norman Wilfred Howell. For services to Chiropody and to Health Care in the West Midlands.
- Jan J. Mrs Hoy, Head, Personnel and Training, Montagu Ventures Ltd. For services to Tourism.
- Miss Nezrine Venetta Hudson. For services to the West Indian community in Derby.
- Walter Hudson. For services to Young People, especially the Duke of Edinburgh Award Scheme, in South Tyneside.
- Elenna Betty, Mrs Hughes. For services to Music in North Wales.
- Gladys Betty Marion, Mrs Hughes. For services to the community in Pershore, Worcestershire.
- Miss Helen Ethelberta Hughes. For services to the Soldiers', Sailors' and Airmen's Families Association.
- Marguerite Mary, Mrs Hughes, Usher, Birkenhead County Court, Lord Chancellor's Department. Industry.
- Muriel, Mrs Hughes. For services to the Multiple Sclerosis Society in Delyn, North Wales.
- Douglas Eric James Hunt, D.S.C. For services to the Coastal Forces Officers' Association.
- Beryl Elsie, Mrs Hutchinson. For services to the British Red Cross Society in Lincolnshire.
- Angus Hutchison, lately Principal Lighthouse Keeper, Fair Isle (South) Lighthouse, Orkney. For services to Marine Safety.
- Mary-Grace, Lady Hutchison. For services to the community in Melton, Suffolk.
- Sister Mary Katherine Hyland. For services to the Royal Hospital for Sick Children, Glasgow.
- Ronald George Ingall. For services to Deaf People in Lincolnshire.
- Christopher Arthur Inger, Senior Messenger, Home Office.
- Brendan Ingle, Boxing Trainer, St. Thomas Boxing Club, Sheffield. For services to Disadvantage*! Young People and to Boxing.
- Michael Ernest Ingle. For services to Anglo/Japanese Trade Links.
- Margaret Ann, Mrs Ironside. For services to the Fostering of Children on Guernsey.
- Arnavaz, Mrs Italia, lately Senior Secretary, Health and Safety Department for the Environment, Transport and the Regions.
- Harold Jackson, JP. For services to Fanning, Conservation and to the community in Forfar, Angus.
- Philip Edmund Jackson. For services to the Merseyside Senior Attendance Centre.
- Ronald Fraser Jameson. For services to Surveying and to the Construction Industry.
- David Gerald Jenkins, Co-ordinator, Coed Cymru. For services to Farm Woodland Management.
- Etta, Mrs Jennings. For services to people with Agoraphobia.
- Francis Jephcott. For services to the community in Sutton Coldfield and the West Midlands.
- Miss Margaret Katherine Jessop. For services to the Lewisham (Mental Health) Users Forum.
- Alison Mclntyre, Mrs Gordon Johnson. For services to the Friends of the Imperial War Museum.
- Lynda Mary, Mrs Johnson, lately Senior Executive Officer, Benefits Agency, Department of Social Security.
- Allan James Johnston. For services to the community, especially the Boys' Brigade, in Carlisle, Cumbria.
- Miss Carys Wyn-Jones, lately Welfare and Accommodation Adviser, University of Liverpool. For services to Higher Education.
- Drina, Mrs Glyn-Jones. For services to Women's Health Education in Chester, Cheshire.
- Florence May, Mrs Jones. For services to the community, especially the WRVS, in Pembrokeshire.
- Frederick William Jones. For services to the community in Berkshire.
- Idris Jones. For services to the community Bridgend, South Wales.
- Kenneth Wyn Jones, Station Officer (Retained), North Wales Fire Service. For services to the Fire Service.
- Philip Noel Brandram-Jones, Manager, Overseas Project Engineering (BT). For services to the Telecommunications Industry.
- Frank Hampton Joughin, Senior Messenger of Tynwald. For services to the Isle of Man Parliament.
- David B. Justice, Chairman and Chief Executive, Quality Scotland Foundation. For services to Business.
- Babubhai Hiralal Kapadia. For services to Community Relations in Manchester.
- Ian Herman Karten. For charitable services.
- Sheila, Mrs Kegg, Lunchtime Welfare Assistant, Primary County Infants School, Colne, Lancashire. For services to Education.
- Jean, Mrs Kendall, Revenue Officer, HM Board of Inland Revenue.
- George McClean Kennedy. For services to the Police.
- Nancy Joan, Mrs Kershaw. For services to Homeless People in Waterloo and Brixton, London.
- Isobel Meikle, Mrs Kidd. For services to the community, especially Cancer Care, in Galashiels.
- David King. For services to Young People in Maidstone, Kent.
- Isabella Meldrum Cargill, Mrs King, Revenue Officer, HM Board of Inland Revenue.
- Rosemarie, Mrs King, Home Carer. For services to the community in Chesterfield, Derbyshire.
- Keith Roberto La Rose, Play Centre Superintendent/Youth Worker, London Borough of Islington Play and Youth Services. For services to Young People.
- Martin John Lansdowne. For services to the Research Councils.
- Lieutenant Commander Henry John Michael Lawrence, R.D. For services to the Fleet Air Arm Officers' Association.
- Ernest Arthur Lawson, JP. For charitable services to the community in Llanelli, Carmarthenshire.
- Phyllis Ann, Mrs Lee, Chair, Grange Residents' Association. For services to the community on the Grange Estate, Cobridge, Stoke-on-Trent.
- Ralph Langdon Lee, Vice President, Camping and Caravanning Club. For services to Camping and Caravanning.
- Charles Derek Legge. For services to Adult Further Education.
- Dora Isabella, Mrs Leitch. For services to Enable in Caithness.
- Maurice Leitch, Writer. For services to Literature.
- Montague Maurice Levy. For services to the St. John Ambulance Brigade in London.
- Miss Denise Lewis. For services to Athletics.
- David Libby, JP. For services to the community especially Young People, in Plymouth, Devon.
- Doreen Mary, Mrs Libby, Revenue Officer, HM Board of Inland Revenue.
- Jack Arthur Liddiard, lately Driver, Government Car and Despatch Agency, Cabinet Office.
- John Lochore. For services to the community in Golspie, Sutherland.
- Andrew Cameron Knight Lockie, lately General Medical Practitioner, Stratford-upon-Avon, Warwickshire. For services to Health Care. *Thomas Malcolm Lord, For services to War Pensioners' Welfare on the Isle of Man.
- Dorothy, Mrs Lott. For services to the Mental Health Support Team for Homeless People in Nottingham.
- Samuel Harold Loughrin. For services to the Leukaemia Research Fund.
- Francis Leonard Luscombe. For services to the community in Topsham, Devon.
- Adam Lydford, Higher Professional and Technology Officer, Ministry of Defence.
- Iain Macarthur. For services to the community in Carloway, Isle of Lewis.
- Charles Eric Mackay, CITES Team Leader, HM Board of Customs and Excise.
- Malcolm Mackenzie, Reservoir Engineer, West of Scotland Water Authority. For services to the Water Industry.
- Ewan Macleod, Stockman, Dalmally Auction Mart. For services to the Crofting communities in Argyll and the Islands.
- William Alexander Macleod. For services to the Royal British Legion Scotland.
- John Alfred Magowan, Q.G.M. For services to the Police.
- Mohammed Ikram Malik, Chairman, Pendle Pakistan Welfare Association. For services to Community Relations in Pendle and Burnley, Lancashire.
- Alan John Maltpress. For services to the Careers Research Advisory Council and to Business and Training in Cambridgeshire.
- Gordon Hendry Marshall. For services to the community in Spennymoor, County Durham.
- Mary Virginia Elizabeth, Mrs Marshall. For services to the community, especially Elderly People, in Chippenham, Wiltshire.
- Philip Marshall. For services to the Police.
- John Thomas Martin, Assistant Firemaster, Strathclyde Fire Brigade. For services to the Fire Service.
- Rosemary Pauline Smith, Mrs Martin, Personal Secretary, Ministry of Defence.
- Sheila Margaret, Mrs Martin, Honours and Appointments Secretary, Ministry of Agriculture, Fisheries and Food.
- Harry Brown McArthur, Mobile Grocer, Isle of Skye. For services to the Rural Retail Trade.
- Miss Maria McCaffrey. For services to the Export Marketing Research Scheme, British Chambers of Commerce.
- Eileen Mary, Mrs McCormack, Divisional Officer, Metropolitan Special Constabulary. For services to the Police.
- Miss Lynda McCowie, Constable, Northumbria Police. For services to the Police, especially Victim Support.
- Miss Elizabeth Christina McDiarmid, Secretary, Perth and Kinross and Angus Provincial Mod. For services to the Gaelic Language.
- Hilda, Mrs McDonald. For services to the Police.
- Patricia Anne, Mrs McGinlay, Chairperson, Glen Oaks Housing Association. For services to Housing in Glasgow.
- Charlotte, Mrs McGrath. For services to Elderly People and to the community.
- Miss Vicky McIntosh, Lead Nurse, Mount Vernon and Watford Hospitals NHS Trust. For services to Health Care.
- Miss Dorothy Roy McKinna. For services to Scouting in Scotland.
- Hugh McLafferty, lately Member, West Dunbartonshire Children's Panel. For services to the Children's Panel Service.
- Patrick John McLarry, General Manager, Shelwork Industries, Action for Blind People. For services to Employment for Disabled People.
- Phyllis Anne, Mrs McMillan, President, Halliwick Association of Swimming Therapy. For services to Swimming for Disabled People.
- Ronald Gerald Patrick McMullan. For services to Pharmacy.
- Barbara Antoinette, Mrs McOgg, Senior Personal Secretary, Department for Culture, Media and Sport.
- Ian Duncan Melville, Principal Weapons Systems Engineer, Matra BAe. For services to the Defence Industry.
- Charles Raymond Merrick. For services to Young People in Bournemouth, Dorset.
- Roy George Middleton. For services to the community in Tywyn, Gwynedd.
- Susan Mary, Mrs Millar. For services to the Police.
- Dinah Ann, Mrs Minton. For services to Headway and to people with head injuries and their caretakers.
- Annette, Mrs Mitchell, Chairman, Shetland Health Council. For services to Health Care.
- Jean, Mrs Mitchell. For services to International Understanding and to Young People.
- Prudence Jennifer, Mrs Mitchell, General Medical Practitioner, Dorset. For services to Health Care, especially for Elderly People.
- Reginald Arthur Mitchell. For services to Inner London Training Ltd. and to the Engineering and Marine Training Authority.
- William Gordon Corlett Mitchell, lately Master, MV Dalmarnock. For services to Public Sanitation.
- Camille, Mrs London-Miyo, Governor. For services to the Effra Nursery and Primary School, Lambeth.
- Rosemary Ann, Mrs Moon. For services to Homeless People in Hastings, East Sussex.
- James Mooney, lately Supervisor (Discipline), Scottish Prison Service.
- Jacqueline Frances, Mrs Morey, Head, Public Enquiry Office, Immigration and Nationality Directorate, Home Office.
- David Emrys Morgan, lately Clerk to the Town Council, Usk, Monmouthshire. For services to the community.
- Dolly Irene, Mrs Morgan, School Crossing Officer, Glynneath, South Wales. For services to Young People.
- Raymond Morgan. For services to the Dyfed Powys Police and to the community.
- Anne Ceridwen, Mrs Morris, Church Organist. For services to the community in Llanddulas, Conwy.
- Graham Frederick Morris. For services to the M.R.C. Dunn Nutrition Unit.
- Norman Moughtin. For charitable services on the Isle of Man.
- Robert Ernest George Moy, Pursebearer to the Lord Chancellor, Lord Chancellor's Department.
- Brendan Murphy. For services to Economic Development and to Communications in Rural Communities.
- John Murray. For services to the Boys' Brigade in Hamilton, Lanarkshire.
- Mary Geraldine, Mrs Murray. For public service.
- Nazar Mustafa. For services to the Muslim Education Co-ordinating Council of UK.
- David John Mustill, Aircraft Dispatcher, British Airways. For services to the Aviation Industry and to the communities of Kasoa and Nyanyano, Ghana.
- William Gordon Myatt. For services to the community, especially Young People, in Newcastle- under-Lyme, Staffordshire.
- Laurie Martin Naumann, Director, Scottish Council for Single Homeless. For services to Homeless People.
- Colette Rose, Mrs Neill, Higher Executive Officer, Ministry of Defence.
- Christine Mary, Mrs Nevard. For services to the Civil Service Benevolent Fund.
- Ronald Frederick Newby. For services to Global Care.
- Margaret Ann, Mrs Newton. For services to disabled people in Bradford, West Yorkshire.
- Esme Jean, Mrs Nickels, Warden, Bouverie House, Northampton Borough Council. For services to the residents of Bouverie House and to the community in Hardingstone, Northamptonshire.
- Alistair Frank Hunter Nicolson, lately Flexible Anti-Smuggling Team Member, HM Board of Customs and Excise.
- John Findlay Nield. For services to Ex-Service Personnel in Blackpool, Lancashire.
- Archie Niven, Building Manager, Government Office for the North East.
- Edward Arthur Noel. For services to the Performing Arts on Jersey.
- Robert Noy, Hospital Visitor. For services to the community in Cambridge.
- Ethel Elizabeth, Mrs Nunn, Founder, Society of Friends of the Lotus Children. For services to the Street Children of India.
- William A. Nutt. For services to Motor Cycling.
- Paul Desmond O'Hearn, Founder Member, Supersavers Project, Perkins Engines Ltd. For services to Environment Protection.
- Francis O'Kane. For services to the Community.
- Moria, Mrs O'Neill. For services to Tourism.
- William Bamford O'Neill, Farmer. For services to Angling and to Tourism.
- Lieutenant Colonel Brian Robert O'Rorke. For services to Management Consultancy.
- Miss Phyllis Oborn, Chairman of Governing Body, Capel Manor College, Enfield, Middlesex. For services to Education.
- Hazel Constance, Mrs Offord. For services to the community in Grantchester, Cambridgeshire.
- Clive Brian Owen, Owner/Managing Director, E Owen Clothing Manufacturers Ltd. For services to the Clothing Industry and to Export.
- George Frederick Owen, Taxi Driver and Secretary, Albany Taxi Charity Fund. For services to the Taxi Industry and to the community in Southwark and Bermondsey, London.
- John Richard Owen. For services to the community in Llanwnog, Powys.
- Miss Nerys Owen, Administrative Officer, Forestry Commission.
- Arthur Reginald Owers, lately President, High Roding Cricket Club, Essex. For services to Cricket.
- Rosaleen Mary, Mrs Padwick, Senior Personal Assistant, Department of Health.
- Leonard Page, Estate Warden, Roaches Estate, Peak District National Park Authority. For services to the Countryside and to Conservation.
- Guy Bruno Daniel Paget, Steward, Corgarff Castle. For services to Conservation.
- Sylvia Brigid Claire, Mrs Pailthorpe. For services to Pastoral Education
- David Victor Palmer. For charitable services to the Great Ormond Street Hospital for Children NHS Trust.
- Marina, Mrs Palmer. For charitable services to the Great Ormond Street Hospital for Children NHS Trust.
- Janice Pamela, Mrs Panton. For humanitarian services to the people of Montserrat.
- Jennifer Naomi Banks, Mrs Parker, JP, DL For services to the community, especially the British Red Cross Society, in Hertfordshire.
- Doris Florence Mary, Mrs Parmenter, lately School Crossing Patrol, Hartley Witney, Hampshire. For services to Road Safety.
- Margaret Sheila, Mrs Parrish. For services to Nursing, particularly of Elderly People, in Bridgend, South Wales.
- George Geddes Parsonage. For services to the Glasgow Humane Society.
- Harshul Patel, Administrative Officer, Ministry of Defence.
- Annette Bell, Mrs Paterson. For services to Disabled and Elderly People in Forres, Morayshire.
- Eileen Frances, Mrs Patterson. For public service.
- Stuart Pearce. For services to Association Football.
- Andrew Currie Peaston, Building Control Manager, Midlothian Council. For services to the Construction Industry.
- Phyllis Vera, Mrs Peck. For charitable services to the Lister Hospital, Stevenage, Hertfordshire.
- Michael Joseph Peirce. For services to the Southmead Project, Bristol and to the welfare of Drug Users.
- Victor Daniel Perfitt, Chairman, British Herbal Medicine Association. For services to the Herbal Medicines Industry.
- George Edward Perry, Managing Director, Hyperion Records. For services to the Music Publishing Industry.
- Harold Edward Phillips. For services to the community in Tetbury, Gloucestershire.
- May, Mrs Phillips. For services to Parent Counselling.
- Miss Anne Philpott. For services to St. Martin in the Fields High School, London.
- David Pierce, lately Senior Training Adviser, Department for Education and Employment.
- Agnela Aida, Mrs Pinto, Senior Personal Secretary, HM Board of Customs and Excise.
- Gerald Pope, Porter, Department for International Development.
- Herbert John Porter, Governor 5, HM Prison Grendon.
- Marjorie Tyrrell, Mrs Porter. For services to the community, especially Young People, in Lambeth, London.
- Sister Theresa Pountney, lately Unit Manager, Elgood House Church Army Hostel, Marylebone, London. For services to Homeless and Mentally 111 People.
- Kathleen Ann, Mrs Poynter. For services to the WRVS in Wiltshire.
- Malcolm Pratt, Leader, Chester-le-Street District Council. For services to Local Government.
- Alison May, Mrs Preston, Music Tutor, Wardle Primary School, Edinburgh. For services to Music Education.
- Thomas Jules Preston, JP, Managing Director, City of Sunderland Training and Enterprise Council. For services to Training, particularly for those with Special Needs.
- Anthony Cecil Price, Sub Officer (Retained), Hereford and Worcester Fire Brigade. For services to the Fire Service.
- Beatrice Elizabeth, Mrs Quinn. For services to the Counselling of the Families of Prisoners and for the Victims of Crime.
- Richard Quirk, lately Combustion Manager, Pilkington pic. For services to Innovation and Energy Efficiency in the Glass Industry.
- Janaid Qureshi. For services to Community Relations in Blackburn, Lancashire.
- Miss Catherine Anne Rafferty. For services to Business and to the community, especially Cancer Charities, in Dumfries.
- Rosalind Mary, Mrs Ragg. For services to the Rare Breeds Survival Trust.
- June Margaret, Mrs Randall. For services to the South West Wiltshire Care at Home Service.
- Helen, Mrs Rankin, Member, Barrhead Housing Association. For services to Housing.
- Edward Graham Reddie, Secretary, Midlands Amenity Societies Association. For services to the Built Environment in the Midlands.
- David Marcus Redston. For services to the Magistrates' Court Service in West Sussex.
- Miss Alison Daphne Reeve, PBS, Employment Service, Department for Education and Employment.
- Margaret, Mrs Reeve, Chair, Derbyshire Autistic Support Group. For services to People with Autism.
- Patrick Joseph Reilly. For charitable services to the community in Surbiton, Surrey.
- Anne Patricia, Mrs Renard. For services to the community, especially Leisure Libraries, in Bradford, West Yorkshire.
- Hugh Reynolds. For services to the British Red Cross Society.
- Neil Biron Rhind. For services to the Preservation of the Historical Character of Blackheath, London.
- Albert Frederick Richardson, Leading Hand, Ministry of Defence.
- James William Richardson. For services to the Birmingham Association of Youth Clubs.
- Leslie Richardson. For services to the Evening Press in York.
- Norman Lloyd Richardson. For services to Education and to the community.
- John Francis Rigby, Life President, Bolton Olympic Wrestling Club. For services to Wrestling.
- Kenneth Riggall, lately Shepherd. For services to the Welfare of the Badlingham Flock of Suffolk Sheep.
- Morag Henderson, Mrs Robb, WRVS Project Organiser, Inverclyde Hospital, Greenock. For services to the community in Greenock, Renfrewshire.
- Cyril Roberts, Farm Worker. For services to Agriculture in Hereford and Worcester.
- Gerald Rogers. For services to the Construction Industry in Wales.
- John Philip Rogers. For services to the Provision of Employment Opportunities in Staffordshire.
- Leon Ellis Rogers, JP. For services to Prison Boards of Visitors.
- John Anthony James Rook. For services to the promotion of self-help groups for people with mental illness, particularly through the Lithium Club.
- Margaret, Mrs Roope. For services to the King George's Fund for Sailors in Bristol.
- Joan, Mrs Roscow. For services to Age Concern in Preston and South Ribble, Lancashire.
- Miss Sylvia Margaret Ross, Senior Teacher, Kittybrewster Primary School, Aberdeen. For services to Education.
- Pamela, Mrs Rouquette. For services to the community, especially Disabled People and the Environment, in Salisbury, Wiltshire.
- Muriel Joy, Mrs Runnalls. For charitable services to the community in Hayle, Cornwall.
- Ronald Edward Seton Rusack, Managing Director, Edinburgh Canal Centre, Ratho. For services to Canal Restoration and Conservation.
- Michael John Rust, Patrol, Automobile Association. For services to the AA and for humanitarian services.
- Miss Deirdre Mary Ryan, lately Personal Assistant to the UK Executive Director, IMF and World Bank. For services to the International Monetary Fund.
- Betty, Mrs Salter, lately Chairman of Governors, Chosen Hill School, Gloucestershire. For services to Education.
- Roger Quentin Saundry, Sub Officer (Retained), Cornwall County Fire Brigade. For services to the Fire Service.
- Joan Margaret, Mrs Savill. For services to the community in Peering, Essex.
- George Anastasi Savva, Member, London Borough of Enfield. For services to the community in Enfield.
- Janet Susan, Mrs Scammell, For services to disabled people and their Carers in Avon.
- Annie, Mrs Schwab, Restaurateur. For services to Tourism.
- Gavin Scott. For services to the London Transport (Retired Employees) Housing Association.
- Miss Hazel Carrington Scott, lately Executive Officer, Ministry of Defence.
- James Scott. For services to the Royal British LegionScotland.
- Peter John Secrett, Operations Manager, Racal Avionics Ltd. For services to the Defence Industry.
- Shirley, Mrs Shaw. For services to the community, especially Consumer Affairs, in Derbyshire.
- Joan, Mrs Sheeran. For services to Primary Renfrewshire.
- Arthur Ernest Shenton, Technical Director, Woodworking Machinery Suppliers' Association. For services to the Woodworking Industry.
- David Sheils, lately Principal Doorkeeper, House of Commons.
- Phyllis Willan, Mrs Shingles. For services to Mentally 111 People on Jersey.
- Sheila Beth, Mrs Shreeve. For services to Historic Dress.
- Gerald Wilson Sillery. For services to the Police.
- Nirmal Singh. For services to Community Relations.
- Patrick Robin Slater. For services to Mencap and to the community in Newbury, Berkshire.
- William George Edward Smart. For services to Number 31 Squadron, Royal Air Force Association.
- Anne Valerie, Mrs Smith, lately Foster Carer, Bath. For services to Fostering.
- Elizabeth Mary, Mrs Smith. For services to the Citizens' Advice Bureau in Banbury, Oxfordshire.
- Icolyn, Mrs Smith. For services to Disadvantaged People in Cowley, Oxfordshire.
- Miss Jean Smith, District Nurse, Plean, Stirling. For services to Health Care.
- John William Lynes Smith, Prison Officer, HM Prison, Hollesley Colony.
- Michael Smith, Engineering Manager, Backhoe Loaders, J.C. Bamford Excavators Ltd. For services to the community in Rocester, Staffordshire.
- Stanley Patrick Smith. For services to the Shrine of Our Lady of Walsingham, Norfolk.
- Gerald Victor Smyth. For charitable services.
- Peter John Solley, Sergeant, Metropolitan Police. For services to the Police.
- John Andrew Spence. For services to the community in Chelmsford, Essex.
- Judith Anne, Mrs Spenceley, General Medical Practitioner, Inverness. For services to Health Care.
- John James Spencer, Higher Professional and Technology Officer, Rutherford Appleton Laboratory. For services to Microwave Research. *James Francis Springford, Chairman's Official Driver, HM Board of Customs and Excise.
- Terence Arthur Spurr, Ambulanceman. For services to the Ambulance Service and to the community in London.
- Brenda Penelope Pamela, Mrs Steele, Local Officer 2, Benefits Agency, Department of Social Security.
- Sarah Elizabeth, Mrs Stewart. For services to people with learning disabilities.
- Denis Trevor Stockwell. For services to Tourism in Bedale, Yorkshire.
- Judith Gabrielle, Mrs Stone. For services to Young People, especially Early Years Education.
- Robert Arthur Stretton, Inspector, Leicestershire Constabulary. For services to the Police and to the community in Aylestone.
- Marian, Mrs Studd. For services to the community on the Isle of Sheppey.
- Roger Summers, Prison Officer Band B, Scottish Prison Service.
- Anthony Hugh Sutton, lately Staff Ideas Co-ordinator, HM Prison Service.
- James Swanston. For services to the Police.
- Samuel Sykes. For services to the National Association for the Care and Resettlement of Offenders in Lambeth, London.
- Sydney Talbot. For public service.
- Alistair Taylor, Chairman, Action for Research into Multiple Sclerosis, Wick. For services to people with Multiple Sclerosis in Caithness.
- Gordon William Taylor, lately Head Medical Laboratory Scientific Officer, Public Health Laboratory, County Hospital, Hereford. For services to Public Health.
- Derek James Thackwray, Postman. For services to the Post Office in Hockley, Essex.
- Gwilym Pryce Thomas, Chairman, Age Concern Cardiff and Vale of Glamorgan. For services to Elderly People.
- Bishop Martin Ruque Thomas. For services to Community Relations in Bedford.
- Raymond Thomas, Honorary Secretary, St. Agnes Lifeboat Station, Cornwall. For services to the RNLI.
- Joan, Mrs Thomason, School Crossing Patrol, Balcombe, West Sussex. For services to Road Safety and to the community.
- Jean, Mrs Thomson. For services to the Angus Riding for the Disabled Group.
- Doris Florence, Mrs Thorogood. For services to the Citizens' Advice Bureau in Sedgefield, County Durham.
- Doreen, Mrs Tinker. For services to the community in Leeds.
- Miss Pamela Elizabeth Tracey. For services to the community, especially Disabled People, in Gloucestershire.
- Alison, Jane, Mrs Traska. For services to Standards in Education.
- Brenda Georgina, Mrs Tregarthen, Young People's Development Officer, Portsmouth City Council. For services to the community in Portsea, Hampshire.
- Gillian Isabel, Lady Trevelyan. For services to the St. Albans Victim Support and Crown Court Witness Service, Hertfordshire.
- Artie Trezise, Performer, The Singing Kettle. For services to Children's Entertainment.
- Miss Kay Trolan. For services to People with Learning Disabilities.
- Gerald Vincent Tyack. For services to the Royal Air Forces Association in Gloucestershire.
- Oliver Tynan. For services to the Countryside and to Conservation.
- Michael Upcroft. For services to the community, especially Health Care, in East Anglia.
- Corky Vale. For services to the welfare of Drug Users.
- Penelope, Mrs Vasey, General Dental Practitioner and Chair, Committee on Vocational Training in England and Wales. For services to Dental Training.
- Geoffrey Rutson Verb. For services to the community in Ilkley, West Yorkshire.
- Valerie Enid, Mrs Vine. For services to the Save The Children Fund in Barmouth, Gwynedd.
- Amice Hubback, Mrs Vosper. For services to the community in Ruthin and District.
- Miss Harriet Ellen Waddup, Church Organist. For services to the community in Marsh Gibbon, Buckinghamshire.
- Aileen Doris, Mrs Walker, Chairman, Billingshurst Parish Council. For services to the community in Billingshurst, West Sussex.
- Jack Walker, Paperkeeper, HM Board of Inland Revenue.
- Sydney Walker. For services to Community Arts Education in Montrose, Angus.
- Elizabeth, Mrs Wallis. For services to the Society of Indexers.
- Robert Norman Walmsley. For services to the Police.
- Sam Robert Walters, Director, Orange Tree Theatre, Richmond, Surrey. For services to the Theatre.
- John Holliday Wand, Founder, J. H. Wand Group. For services to the Electronics Industry.
- Anthony Peter Ward, Head of Airworthiness, Military Aircraft and Aerostructures, BAe. For services to the Aerospace Industry.
- John Warr, Senior Facilities Manager, Metropolitan Police. For services to the Police and to Young People.
- Michael Francis Joseph Watson. For services to Prison Boards of Visitors.
- John Michael Weaver, lately Estates Services Manager, Harrogate College, North Yorkshire. For services to Education.
- John van Weenan, Executive Director, Task Force Albania. For services to the Children of Albania.
- Lorraine, Mrs Weight. For services to the Woolhampton Primary School, Woolhampton, Berkshire.
- James Erskine Weir. For services to Youth Football.
- William Weir. For charitable services to the community.
- Ann Georgina, Mrs Wells, Assistant District Commissioner, Cub Scouts. For services to Scouting in Thanet, Kent.
- Ethel Margaret Florence, Mrs Wheal. For services to the community on the Rose Hill Estate, Oxford.
- Jimmy White. For services to Snooker.
- Leslie James White, lately Executive Officer, Contributions Agency, Department of Social Security.
- Miss Mairead Aine White. For services to Community Regeneration.
- Harold Raymond Whitley, Northern Line Project Stations Manager, London Underground. For services to Public Transport and to Overseas Aid to Bosnia.
- Ian Blair Wightman. For services to Deprived Communities in Dundee.
- David Bryan Wilkins, Director, Eurogroup for Animal Welfare. For services to Animal Welfare.
- Eric Wilkins. For services to the Quarry Bank Mill Trust.
- John Jackson Willacy, lately Sub Officer (Retained), Lancashire Fire and Rescue Service. For services to the Fire Service.
- Charles Adolf Williams. For charitable services to the community in Yorkshire.
- Walter McGillivray Williamson, Production Training Branch Leader, BP Oil, British Petroleum Company pic. For services to the Oil Industry.
- David Willing. For services to the community in Findhorn, Moray.
- Evelyn Agatha, Mrs Willis, Personal Secretary, Department of Trade and Industry.
- Adam James Wilson, JP. For services to Further Education.
- Constance Mary, Mrs Wilson, Resident Manager, Condercum Court Sheltered Housing Scheme, Newcastle upon Tyne. For services to Housing.
- Duncan Robertson Wilson. For services to Angling in Aberdeenshire.
- Joseph Wilson. For services to the community in Barry, Vale of Glamorgan.
- Mervyn Charles Winslade. For services to Farming and to the community in Somerset.
- Jacqueline Carol, Mrs Wood, JP, Non-Executive Director, Dundee Teaching Hospitals NHS Trust. For services to the NHS.
- Martin David Wood. For services to the Special Olympics.
- Victoria, Mrs Wood. For services to the Wiltshire and Swindon New Deal Steering Group.
- Terence Woolhouse, Leader, Christ Church Youth Club, Sheffield. For services to Young People.
- Patricia, Mrs Woollard, lately Personal Secretary, Department for the Environment, Transport and the Regions.
- Sheila Kathleen, Mrs Worleighton, Member, St. Edmundsbury Borough Council. For services to the community in West Suffolk and to the Bury St. Edmunds Women's Aid Centre.
- David Elliot Worrall, Infrastructure Manager, Electronics Data Systems (Defence) Ltd. For services to the Defence Industry.
- Reginald Albert Charles Wrighton. For services to the community in Willenhall, West Midlands.
- Henry Martin Wuga. For services to sport for disabled people.
- Tim Yau. For services to the Chinese community and to Community Relations.
- Kai Kin Yung. For services to the National Portrait Gallery.

Diplomatic and Overseas

- Nancy, Mrs Abiederrahmane, Honorary British Consul, Nouakchott, Mauritania.
- Geraldine Clair, Mrs van AERSCHOT, lately Secretary to the Executive Secretary, North Atlantic Treaty Organisation.
- Helen Elizabeth, Mrs ANDERSON, Head, General Office, British High Commission, Canberra.
- Laelia Frances, Mrs ANDERSON. For nursing and welfare services to the community, Kenya.
- Miss Margaret Rose ANDREWS. For services to sick and underprivileged children, Zambia.
- Arthur John BARTON, Director of Fisheries, Falkland Islands Government.
- Miss Josephine Mary BELL. For nursing services with the European Commission Medical Service.
- Guy van den BERG. For services to the British community in Portugal.
- Molly Patricia, Mrs BICKER, lately Locally engaged Officer, HM Embassy, Tirana.
- Stuart Leonard BIRD, lately Head, Logistics Business Unit, Foreign and Commonwealth Office.
- Patricia, Mrs BOCHENSKA, lately Chairman, Red Cross Society, Vanuatu.
- Terry BRAMHAM, Locally engaged Commercial Officer, British Consulate-General, Toronto.
- Gillian Carol, Mrs BRIDGEWATER, Locally engaged Accountant and Pro-Consul, Munich.
- Stephen BURGES, lately Honorary British Consul, Asmara.
- Steven John BURKE. For services to education and English Language Teaching, Malaysia.
- Sharon, Mrs CAMPBELL, Programme Manager, Save the Children Fund, Northern Afghanistan.
- Elfrida Louise, Mrs CHAPPELL. For public and community service, Bermuda.
- Norill lone, Mrs Cox, Housekeeper/Cook, Government House, Tortola, British Virgin Islands.
- Dr Yasmin Nathoo DHANJI, lately Chief Practitioner, British European Medical Clinic, Kiev.
- Jonathan Patrick DOLAND. For services to UK-Qatar trade.
- Miss Margaret Ann DOUGHTY. For services in promoting basic literary skills for deprived students, USA.
- Alistair Charteris DUNCAN. For services to British-Arab understanding.
- John FOREMAN. For services to the welfare of disabled patients, Croatia.
- James Patrick GALLIANO, JP For services to community welfare, Gibraltar.
- Colin Edwin GATELY. For services to HM Government's emergency aid programme, Bosnia.
- Eric Mervyn GEORGE. For services to the community in the field of music, St. Helena.
- Mary Elizabeth, Mrs GODDARD. For welfare and counselling services to the English-speaking communities in Paris.
- Timothy James GRAY, Headmaster, British School, Seoul Foreign School, Korea.
- Martin HAMER. For services to British engineering overseas, latterly in India.
- Elizabeth, Mrs HARRIS, Wilton Park Conference Administrator, Foreign and Commonwealth Office.
- Patricia Ruth, Mrs HAYNES, Personal Assistant to the Governor, Bermuda.
- Christopher HUNTER, Founder/Director, Centre for Peacemaking and Community Development.
- Jennie Alexandra, Mrs JHA. For health welfare services to the socially under-privileged in India.
- Miss Catherine Helen Courtier JONES, Deputy Head of Mission, HM Embassy, Tirana.
- Roger Marcus KEY. For services to the Botswana Geological Survey.
- Dr Freda Lilian KIM. For charitable services to disabled children, Korea.
- Lawrence Richard LAWS. For voluntary counselling services, Saudi Arabia.
- Simon James LEGGETT. For services to the community, Papua New Guinea.
- Margaret Niven, Mrs LYLE. For services to the work of Cheshire Homes in Swaziland.
- Malcolm Alfred Anthony MASON, British Vice-Consul, Amsterdam, and Chairman, Amsterdam RAF Association.
- Hans-Christoph John Gemmingen von MASSENBACH, Locally engaged Commercial Officer, British Consulate-General, Duesseldorf.
- Graham Alexander Stuart McCuLLOCH, lately Director, British Council, Dubai.
- Jamie Jonathan MILLER, Second Secretary, Foreign and Commonwealth Office.
- Denise Anne, Mrs ODDY. For services to the British community and to local charities in Seoul.
- Dorothy Joan, Mrs OSBORN, lately Locally engaged Consular Officer, Harare.
- Carole Jennifer, Mrs PHAROAH. For charitable services overseas, latterly in Malaysia.
- Sarah, Mrs PHILPS. For welfare services to disadvantaged children in Moscow.
- Richard Trevor ROBINSON, Honorary British Consul, Tamale, Ghana.
- Dr Paul Robert BENDOR-SAMUEL. For services to medical welfare in Northern Tunisia.
- Eurwen, Mrs SCOTT. For services to the local British community in Portugal.
- Jill Treharne, Mrs SHARP, Second Secretary, Foreign and Commonwealth Office.
- Eleanor Jillian, Mrs PORTER-SMITH. For welfare services to the expatriate community in Spain.
- Miss Caroline Ann SMYTH, lately Chargé d'Affaires, HM Embassy, Tripoli.
- Ross Hastings Franshow TALBOT. For services to entertainment, Bermuda.
- George TULLO. For services to UK commercial interests in Switzerland.
- Marjorie Constance, Mrs TURBAYNE, O.A.M., National President, Australia-Britain Society.
- Marion Ruth, Mrs TZANAKI, British Consul, Heraklion, Crete.
- Camilla Augustina, Mrs WATTS. For services to education and community welfare, Montserrat.
- Geraldine Mensforth, Mrs WILLCOX. For community service in Japan.
- Sidonie Grace Mary, Mrs WOLPER. For services to the Anglican community, Liege.

=== Royal Red Cross ===
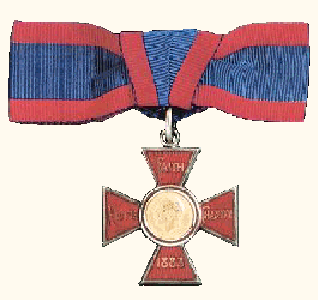
The Royal Red Cross for exceptional services in military nursing

The Royal Red Cross is a military decoration awarded for exceptional services in military nursing.

==== First Class (RRC) ====
- Commander Isabella Barclay Gauld, Queen Alexandra's Royal Naval Nursing Service.

==== Second Class (ARRC) ====
- Lieutenant Neale Derek Piper, Queen Alexandra's Royal Naval Nursing Service.

=== Queen's Police Medal ===
==== England and Wales ====
- Ian Warwick Blair, Chief Constable, Surrey Police.
- Paul Cannon, Inspector, South Wales Police.
- Gordon Chisholm, Constable, Avon and Somerset Constabulary.
- David Lloyd Clarke, Assistant Chief Constable (Designated), West Yorkshire Police.
- Desmond Ieuan Rhys Cooper, Detective Constable, Devon and Cornwall Constabulary.
- David James Crompton, Detective Chief Inspector, Metropolitan Police.
- Michael Noel Curtis, Assistant Chief Constable (Designated), Police Information Technology Organisation.
- Graham Alfred Frank Cutting, Chief Superintendent, Avon and Somerset Constabulary.
- Brian Douglas Flood, Detective Chief Superintendent, Kent County Constabulary.
- Roger Gaspar, Director Intelligence, National Criminal Intelligence Service.
- David Edward Michael Gilbertson, Assistant Inspector of Constabulary, HM Inspectorate of Constabulary.
- Andrew Derrick Glaister, lately Chief Superintendent, Greater Manchester Police.
- Miss Jillian Rosemary Harkness, Detective Constable, Wiltshire Constabulary.
- Ian Holding, Assistant Chief Constable (Designated), Cheshire Constabulary.
- Bryan Hookes, lately Constable, Metropolitan Police.
- Richard Henry Lyttle, Superintendent, Warwickshire Constabulary.
- Stephen Robert McKee, Constable, Metropolitan Police.
- Robin Douglas Mouzer, Constable, West Midlands Police.
- Garry Wayne Rorgers, Detective Constable, Greater Manchester Police.
- Gillian, Mrs Shields, Constable, Cumbria Constabulary.
- Michael Raymond Smythe, Superintendent, Metropolitan Police.
- Eric Vallance, Chief Constable, Sovereign Base Areas Police (SBA), Cyprus.
- Peter John Whent, lately Detective Chief Superintendent, British Transport Police.
- Norman George Woollons, Inspector, Humberside Police.

==== Scotland ====
- Michael David Currie, Deputy Chief Constable, Central Scotland Police.
- John Lawrence Duncan, Assistant Chief Constable, Strathclyde Police.
- James Fraser, Chairman, Scottish Police Federation.
- Craig Galbraith Napier, Inspector, Strathclyde Police.

==== Northern Ireland ====
- Bernard Fitzpatrick, Superintendent, Royal Ulster Constabulary.
- William Dougan Kyle, lately Detective Inspector, Royal Ulster Constabulary.

==== Overseas ====
- Harold Stephen Moniz, Deputy Commissioner, Bermuda Police Service.
- Campbell DeCosta Simons, lately Superintendent of Police, Bermuda Police Service.

=== Queen's Fire Service Medal ===
==== England and Wales ====
- Brian Airey, lately Deputy Chief Fire Officer, Merseyside Fire Brigade.
- Michael Leslie Jack Kernan, Staff Officer to the Commandant, Fire Service College.
- Graham John Tummey, Assistant Chief Fire Officer, Staffordshire Fire and Rescue Service.
- Robert John Percy Webb, Principal Control Officer, London Fire and Civil Defence Authority.

==== Scotland ====
- Miss Elizabeth McMurdo, Senior Fire Control Operator, Fife Fire and Rescue Service.
- James Fullerton Napier Sub-Officer, Lothian and Borders Fire Brigade.

=== Colonial Police and Fire Service Medal ===
- Carlton Eugene Adams, Detective Chief Inspector, Bermuda Police Service.
- Jonathan David Smith, Chief Inspector, Bermuda Police Service.
- Sinclair Harold White, Chief Inspector, Bermuda Police Service.

== Commonwealth of the Bahamas ==
Five individuals were named in the Bahamas' New Year Honours, these being:

- William C. Allen, Knight Commander of the Order of St Michael and St George
- Four awards of the Queen's Police Medal

== Cook Islands ==
=== Order of the British Empire ===
==== Member of the Order of the British Empire (MBE) ====
- Soa Tini Joseph. For services to education and the community.
- Tautara Purea. For services to education and the community.

=== British Empire Medal (BEM) ===
- Elizabeth Peyroux, Mrs Bailey. For services to charity and the community.
- Turaratoru Pekepo. For services to education and the community.

== Grenada ==
=== Order of the British Empire ===
==== Officer of the Order of the British Empire (OBE) ====
- Charles Reynold Alleyne. For public service.

==== Member of the Order of the British Empire (MBE) ====
- Matthew Edison Mitchell. For services to cultural development.
- Miss Blanche Florence Sylvester. For services to education.
- Miss Agatha Taylor. For services to education.

=== British Empire Medal (BEM) ===
- Mien Charles. For services to the fishing industry.
- Anthony Bernard McMillan. For services to education and community development.

== Papua New Guinea ==
=== Knight Bachelor ===
- John Norbert Dawanincura, OBE For services to sport.

=== Order of Saint Michael and Saint George ===
==== Knight Commander of the Order of St Michael and St George (KCMG) ====
- Dennis Charles Young, CMG, JP For public service.

==== Companion of the Order of St Michael and St George (CMG) ====
- The Honourable Iairo Lasaro, M.P. For political and community service.

=== Order of the British Empire ===
==== Knight Commander of the Order of the British Empire (KBE) ====
Civil Division

- Akapite Wamiri. For services to commerce and industry.

==== Commander of the Order of the British Empire (CBE) ====
Civil Division

- Miss Jocelyn Komeng. For public service.
- Professor Sirius Naraqi. For services to medicine and science.
- John Ralston Wild. For services to architecture and town planning, aviation and the community.

==== Officer of the Order of the British Empire (OBE) ====
Civil Division

- Father Owen Guba Ami. For services to religion and the community.
- Maurice Brownjohn. For services to the fishing industry.
- Brother James Coucher. For services to religion and the community.
- John Noifa Kasule. For services to the community.
- Ango Wangatau. For services to accountancy.
- Sam Wingen. For services to Kiunga, Western Province.

Military Division

- Colonel Ben Norrie. For services to the Papua New Guinea Defence Force.

==== Member of the Order of the British Empire (MBE) ====
Civil Division

- David Anderson Conn. For services to education and sport.
- Mathew Bernard Foley. For services to the community and commerce.
- Asa Kabo. For services to agriculture and the community.
- Kila Ara Karo, Consul General, Sydney.
- Miss Paula Mek. For services to women and the community.
- Chief Superintendent Noble Nivo, Papua New Guinea Correctional Service
- John Barus Rambu. For services to banking and the community.
- Bernard Wisira Raufun. For services to the Royal Papua New Guinea Constabulary.
- Assistant Commissioner John Remoke Tara, Papua New Guinea Correctional Service.
- Nalau Nathan Teriths. For public service and for services to the church and the community.
- Tony Kubol Wii. For services to local government and the community.

Military Division

- Lieutenant Colonel Walter Salamas. For services to the Papua New Guinea Defence Force.
- Lieutenant Colonel Michael Talalanga. For services to the Papua New Guinea Defence Force.

=== Imperial Service Order ===
- Steven Abisai. For services to the local and district courts and the community.
- Singin Passom. For services to religion, the community and rural development.

=== British Empire Medal ===
Civil Division

- Sergeant Yatusere Dawon Anis, Papua New Guinea Correctional Service.
- Ponis Kindik. For public service.
- Sipa Kopa. For services to the community.
- Dominic Kovei. For public service.
- Lukas Krewa. For services to religion and the community.
- Bre Kuman. For services to local government.
- Kaluwin Lapanpaun. For services to Baluan Island.
- Gedeng Laros. For services to religion and the community.
- Corporal May Hakeon Mondia. For service in the care of women prisoners.
- Paul Oai. For voluntary service in the community.
- Wiya Ramula. For services to religion and the community.
- Lucas Laufa Saea. For public service.
- Geoffrey William Simpson. For public service.

Military Division

- Sergeant Bigimo Deregi. For services to the Papua New Guinea Defence Force.
- Chief Warrant Officer Lesley Koesan. For services to the Papua New Guinea Defence Force.
- Warrant Officer John Yadabut. For services to the Papua New Guinea Defence Force.

== Belize ==
=== Order of the British Empire ===
==== Commander of the Order of the British Empire (CBE) ====
- Charles Bartlett Hyde, MBE For public service and services to sport.

==== Officer of the Order of the British Empire (OBE) ====
- Audrey, Mrs Courtenay. For services to the Red Cross and nursing.

==== Member of the Order of the British Empire (MBE) ====
- Allan Edmund Arthurs. For public service.
- Shirley, Mrs Mahung. For services to nursing and the community.
- Armando Valdez. For public service and services to education.

=== British Empire Medal (BEM) ===
- Vera, Mrs Lo. For services to tourism and public charities.
- Rafael Angel Nunez. For services to education and the community.
- Sister Elsa Maria Oliva, R.S.M. For services to education, religion and humanitarian causes.
- Miguel Wong. For services to education and the community.

== Antigua and Barbuda ==
=== Order of Saint Michael and Saint George ===
==== Companion of the Order of St Michael and St George (CMG) ====
- Joseph Augustine Myers. For public service.

=== Order of the British Empire ===
==== Officer of the Order of the British Empire (OBE) ====
- Ludolph Clement Cothrill Brown, MBE For public service.

==== Member of the Order of the British Empire (MBE) ====
- Hazlyn Rosetta Mason, Mrs Francis. For services to education.
- Norman Delvin Southwell. For public service.

=== British Empire Medal (BEM) ===
- Miss Esther Naomi Henry. For community service.
- Edris Nora Casilla, Mrs James. For services to the Scout Movement.
- Warrant Officer Maurice Cleofoster James. For services to the Antigua and Barbuda Defence Force.

== Saint Christopher and Nevis ==
=== Order of the British Empire ===
==== Officer of the Order of the British Empire (OBE) ====
- Edmund Wickham Lawrence. For services to banking and commerce.

==== Officer of the Order of the British Empire (OBE) ====
- Krishan Devidas Chandiramani. For services to commercial development.
- Doctor MacMilla Lorenzo Hodge. For services to public health.

=== British Empire Medal (BEM) ===
- Frederick Alwyn Johnson. For services to commercial development in rural areas, (to be dated 5 December 1998)
- James Ernest Osborne. For service to the trade union movement.
