= Eastern Eye =

British weekly newspaper

- Type: Weekly newspaper
- Publisher: Garavi Gujarat Publications Ltd
- Editor: Ramniklal Solanki CBE
- Founded: 1989; 37 years ago
- Language: English
- Headquarters: Garavi Gujarat House; No. 1 Silex Street, London SE1 0DW
- ISSN: 0965-464X
- Website: www.easterneye.biz

The Eastern Eye is a British weekly newspaper, published every Friday. It was created in 1989 and was first published by The Guardian, before becoming a standalone newspaper.

== History ==
Sarwar Ahmed founded the Eastern Eye from his bedroom in 1989. Announcing itself as the newspaper "for the Asian perspective", Eastern Eye reportedly sold 30,000 copies a week nationwide in its first year. In 1996, the newspaper started compiling and publishing a list of "Britain's Richest Asians 200". In mid-2008, the circulation was about 20,000.

Its ownership subsequently changed several times. It was part of the Trinity Mirror Group before a management buyout and the creation of the Ethnic Media Group (EMG). The EMG also published Asian Times, New Nation and Caribbean Times, incorporating African Times.

In 2009, Eastern Eye was sold to the Asian Media & Marketing Group, presently known as Asian Media Group (AMG).

AMG has continued the title's tradition of publishing the annual Asian Rich List and staging the Asian Business Awards every year, as well as publishing its "30 Global Asian Stars" and "Top 50 Asian Celebrities" lists.

== Digital Presence ==
Online Platform: Eastern Eye's website complements the print edition, offering sections including business, music and film, health and beauty, and more.
