= John Dodge (paediatrician) =

British paediatrician (1933–2022)

John Dodge CBE, FRCP, FRCPE, FRCPI, FRCPCH
- Born: John Ashton Dodge; 1933
- Died: 7 December 2022 (aged 89)
- Occupation: Paediatrician

John Ashton Dodge (1933 – 7 December 2022) was a British paediatrician, specialising in cystic fibrosis.

After his retirement in 1997, he became Emeritus Professor of Child Health at the Queen's University, Belfast, and Honorary Professor of Child Health at the University of Wales at Swansea.

Dodge was chair of the Scientific and Medical Advisory Committees of the International Cystic Fibrosis (Mucoviscidosis) Association from 1992 to 1996. He also chaired working parties on cystic fibrosis for the World Health Organization.

Dodge was appointed Commander of the Order of the British Empire (CBE) in the 1999 New Year Honours for services to children's health.

Dodge died on 7 December 2022, at the age of 89.
