= George Poste =

American scientist

George Henry Poste, CBE FRS, is a former director of the Biodesign Institute at Arizona State University.

== Career ==
Poste is the Del E. Webb Professor of Health Innovation and Chief Scientist at The Complex Adaptive Systems Initiative (CASI) at Arizona State University (ASU). This program integrates research in genomics, synthetic biology and high performance computing to study the altered regulation of molecular networks in human diseases to develop new diagnostic tests for precision medicine and the remote monitoring of health status using miniaturized body sensors and mobile devices. He assumed this post in 2009. From 2003 to 2009 he directed and built The Biodesign Institute at ASU.

Effective 1 January 2021 he will assume additional leadership of the new Institute for Future Health (IFH) a joint venture between ASU and the University of Arizona in precision health and digital health. This will focus on remote health monitoring technologies with a focus on the use of digital psychiatry and cognitive computing to address the growing burden of mental illness.

He has published more than 400 research papers and edited 14 books on pharmaceutical technologies, cancer and infectious diseases. He has received honorary degrees in science, law and medicine and was awarded the rank of Commander of the British Empire by Queen Elizabeth II for his contributions to research and international security.

He currently serves on the Board of Directors of Exelixis, Caris Life Sciences, MediSix (Singapore) and the Scientific Advisory Boards of the A. Alfred Taubman Medical Research Institute at the University of Michigan, Synthetic Genomics, Vir Biotechnology, iNanoBio and Haplogen GmbH (Vienna).

From 1992 to 1999, he was Chief Science and Technology Officer and President, R&D, of SmithKline Beecham (SB) (now GlaxoSmithKilne). During his tenure at SB, he was associated with the successful registration of multiple drug, vaccine and diagnostic products. He has served on the Board of Directors of Illumina, Structural Genomix (acquired by Lilly), Orchid Biosciences (acquired by LapCorp), diaDexus (acquired by Vaxgen), Monsanto (acquired by Bayer) and Advanced PCS (acquired by CVS-Caremark).

In 2004 he was named "R&D Scientist of the Year" by R&D Magazine, he received the Einstein award from the Global Business Leadership Council (2006), the Scrip Lifetime Achievement award voted by the leadership of the global pharmaceutical industry (2009) and the Arizona Bioindustry Association Pioneer Award (2016).

He is a Fellow of the U.K. Royal Society, the Royal College of Pathologists, the U.K. Academy of Medicine and The American Institute for Medical and Biological Engineering (AIMBE), a member of EU Academy of Sciences, the Council for Foreign Relations and the US Academy of Medicine Forum on Global Health. He served as a member of the Defense Science Board of the U.S. Department of Defense and currently serves on advisory committees for several U.S. government agencies in defense, intelligence, national security and healthcare and is an Ex-Officio Member of the Bipartisan Commission on Biodefense.

== History and schooling ==
Educated in the United Kingdom at Bexhill-on-Sea Grammar school and the University of Bristol.

== Honours and awards ==
Poste has received honorary doctorates in law and science for his contributions to international health policy and is board certified in pathology.

He was elected a Fellow of the Royal Society in 1997. He was appointed CBE in the 1999 New Year Honours.

He is a Fellow of the UK Academy of Medicine, The Royal College of Pathologists and a Member of the Council for Foreign Relations.
