= Ranjit Sondhi =

BBC Governor and university lecturer

Ranjit Sondhi CBE was a BBC Governor with responsibility for the English regions. First appointed in August 1998, his term of office was renewed for another four years in 2002 and finished in October 2006.

Sondhi was born in Punjab, India and moved to England at a young age. He was educated at Bedford School and the University of Birmingham, which he graduated with a BSc in physics.

He was a senior lecturer at Westhill College from 1985 to 2007.

He was appointed CBE in the 1999 New Year Honours for services to community relations.

In 2024, Sondhi became a trustee of the Canal and River Trust.
