= Doris Ann Goodchild =

British lecturer, writer, artist and charity fundraiser (1906–1999)

- Born: 11 March 1906
- Died: 19 September 1999 (aged 93)
- Occupations: Artist, author and illustrator

Doris Ann Goodchild (11 March 1906 – 19 September 1999) was a lecturer, writer, artist, illustrator and charity fundraiser.

== Early life and education ==
Doris Ann Goodchild was born on the 11 March 1906 in London to Fred and Edith Goodchild. Her parents ran the family drapery business, at 128-130 Anerley Road, south east London, where Doris was born the middle child of seven. A bright child, she won a scholarship to a local grammar school before she trained to become a teacher in 1923. She lived with her parents above the family shop until it was sold in 1936, working in various schools throughout her traineeship and early career, before taking up a teaching post in war-damaged Bristol in 1942.

It was in this year that she met the woman who would become her lifetime companion, Margaret McQueen Burnett. The two shared a home together from 1956 when they lived in Bishop’s Stortford. In 1958, the pair began to prepare for their retirement, Burnett as head mistress of Walthamstow High School and Goodchild as Senior Lecturer at Hockerill Teaching Training College in Bishop's Stortford. They eventually settled on East Lothian after a holiday there, purchasing a small piece of ground to build a home in Haddington in 1965.

== Retirement and writing career ==
During their retirement Goodchild and Burnett involved themselves in local charity work and travelling the country and internationally. Goodchild wrote, sketched and painted numerous details from their lives and journeys, publishing her first book in 1978, an illustrated guidebook to Edinburgh's Royal Mile.

In her final years, following the death of Burnett, Goodchild sold many of her own artworks, raising money for local charities. She died suddenly at her home in Haddington in September 1999. Many of her remaining manuscripts, sketchbooks and notebooks were bequeathed to the National Library of Scotland.

== Honours ==
Goodchild was granted an MBE in the 1999 New Year Honours List for services to illustration, particularly of guide books and to the cause of education. One of her paintings, White Californian Poppies is in the collection of the Royal Scottish Academy of Art & Architecture

== Selected publications ==
- Goodchild, Doris Ann, The Royal Mile a Souvenir Guide (1978)
- Goodchild, Doris Ann, Hills of Edinburgh (1979)
- Goodchild, Doris Ann, Pen Portraits of Edinburgh (1981) ISBN 0950656151
- Goodchild, Doris Ann, A Few thoughts in praise of foods (1982)
- Goodchild, Doris Ann, Days in the Western Highlands and Islands (1982)
- Goodchild, Doris Ann, Glimpses of a Few Cities, Towns, Countrysides, at Home & Abroad: Some 700 Drawings & Diary (1984) ISBN 0947620001
- Goodchild, Doris Ann, Travels In Scotland, England and Overseas (1986)
- Goodchild, Doris Ann, The Spoils of Time – Some aspects of Living in this 20th Century (1988) ISBN 0-947620-05-2
- Goodchild, Doris Ann, Diary Days in the 86th Year of Great Aunt Tit-Bit (1990) ISBN 0947620095
- Goodchild, Doris Ann, Recollections & Reflections by Rail (1990) ISBN 9780947620066
- Goodchild, Doris Ann, Diary – How I spent my Ninetieth Birthday Weekend (1996)
