= Kevin Gournay =

British academic and nurse

Kevin Gournay is a registered British psychiatric nurse. He is an emeritus professor at the Institute of Psychiatry, Psychology and Neuroscience, King's College London.

== Career ==
He retired in December 2018. He returned to clinical work as part of the national response to COVID-19; retiring once more in 2023. He is an Honorary Professor at the Matilda Centre; University of Sydney. His work in Australia spanned 30 years and focused on the intersection of mental health and substance use. During the COVID19 pandemic he contributed to research on the impacts of COVID19 on mental health.

== Recognition ==
- He was made a Fellow of the Royal College of Nursing in 1998.

== Publications ==
Gournay is the author or editor of 17 books and monographs and more than 300 chapters, articles, books and conference papers.

== Sources ==
- Biodata
