= Graham Winyard =

British physician (born 1947)

Graham Winyard CBE FRCP FFPH
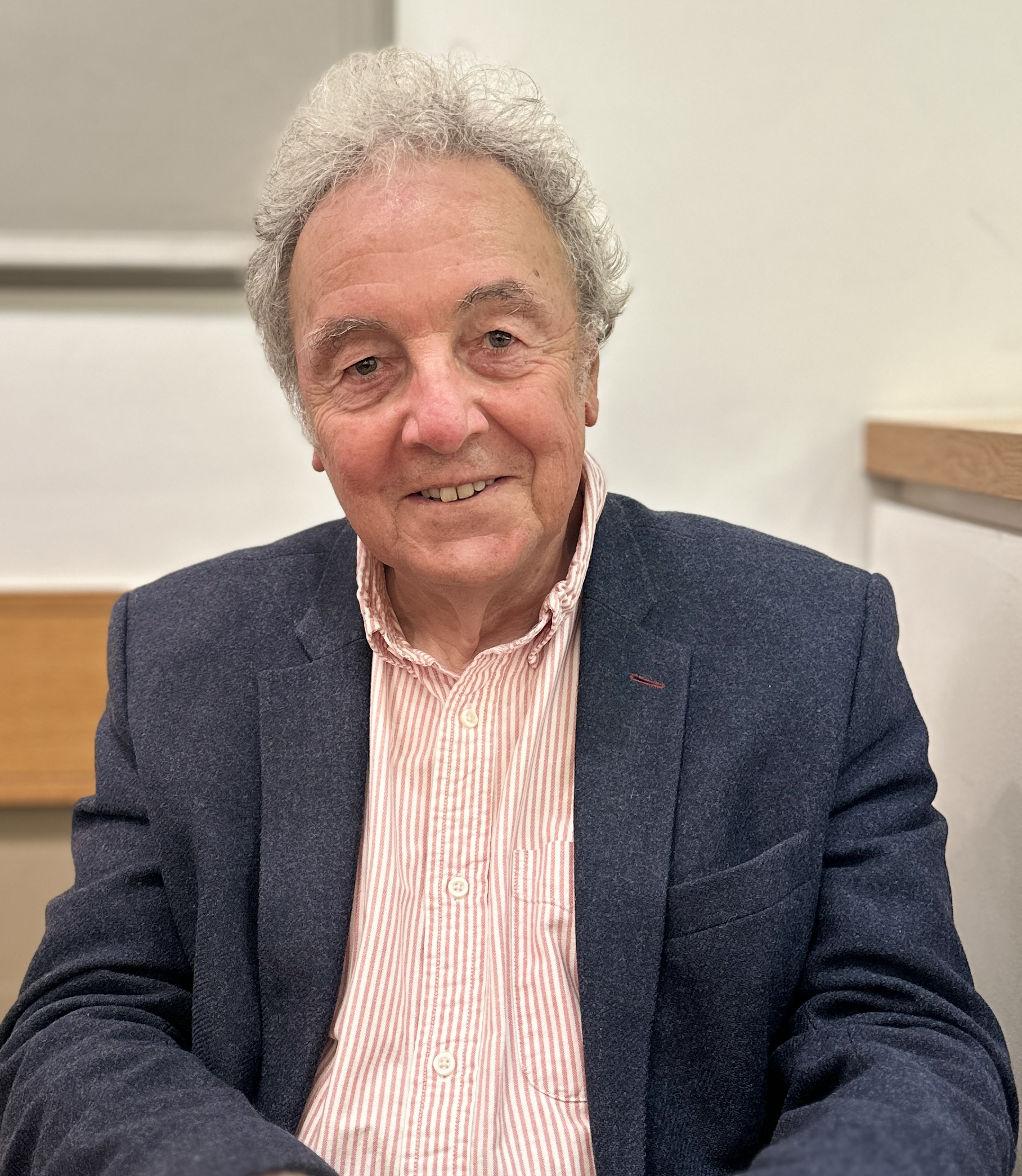
- Graham Winyard (2024)
- Born: January 1947 (age 78)
- Education: Hertford College, Oxford
- Medical career
- Profession: Physician
- Field: Public health
- Institutions: National Health Service

Graham Winyard (born January 1947) is a British public health physician who was medical director of the National Health Service in England from 1993 to 1999 and deputy chief medical officer of the NHS in England. He is a member of Health Professionals for Assisted Dying, and an associate of Hertford College, Oxford.

== Early life ==
Graham Winyard was born in January 1947. He was educated at a grammar school and was the first of his family to attend university. He studied medicine at Hertford College, University of Oxford, and at the Middlesex Hospital.

== Career ==
Winyard practiced as a public health physician and was medical director of the National Health Service (NHS) in England from 1993 to 1999 and deputy chief medical officer of the NHS in England. He is a fellow of the Royal College of Physicians and a fellow of the Faculty of Public Health.

== Other activities ==
Winyard took a master's degree in religion at SOAS. He has converted to Buddhism and is a lay treasurer of a Theravada forest monastery in West Sussex.

He is a member of Health Professionals for Assisted Dying.

He is an associate of Hertford College, University of Oxford. Winyard was appointed Commander of the Order of British Empire.
