= John Kemp-Welch =

British businessman (born 1936)

Sir John Kemp-Welch
- Born: 31 March 1936 (age 90)
- Education: Winchester College
- Occupation: stockbroker
- Known for: previous chairman of the London Stock Exchange (1994-2000)

Sir John Kemp-Welch (born 31 March 1936) is a British businessman, who was chairman of the London Stock Exchange from 1994 to 2000, before which he was senior partner at City of London stockbroker Cazenove.

== Career ==
Kemp-Welch began his career at Hoare & Co.

He joined City stockbroker, Cazenove in 1959. He became joint senior partner at Cazenove in 1980. He stepped down from that position in 1994 to become chairman of the London Stock Exchange.

Less than two years after becoming chairman of the London Stock Exchange, Kemp-Welch removed CEO Michael Lawrence, whose style was said to have led to frictions with the Stock Exchange Board. From Lawrence’s departure in December 1995 to his successor joining in August 1996, Kemp-Welch acted as executive chairman. Whereas Lawrence had come from Prudential, Kemp-Welch’s choice of replacement, Gavin Casey, came from city brokerage Smith New Court securities (which had been bought by Merrill Lynch in 1995).

Kemp-Welch also oversaw the continued modernisation of the stock exchange’s governance, in particular its demutualisation whereby it moved from a member-based institution to a shareholder-owned company.

The following month, Kemp-Welch’s successor as chairman - Donald Cruickshank - was announced, which was quickly followed by the ill-fated proposal to merge the London Stock Exchange and Deutsche Boerse.

== Appointments after the London Stock Exchange ==
Between 2000 and 2006, Kemp-Welch was a non-executive board member of HSBC.

== Land ownership and farming ==
As of 2024, Kemp-Welch owned 5,000 acres of “difficult hill farming land” in Perthshire where he and his children farmed blackface sheep.
