= Ramniklal Solanki =

Indian-British journalist and newspaper editor (1931–2020)

- Born: 1931
- Died: 1 March 2020 (aged 88–89)
- Occupations: journalist and newspaper editor

Ramniklal Chhanganlal Solanki CBE (1931 – 1 March 2020) was an Indian-British journalist and newspaper editor. He moved to the United Kingdom in 1964.

== Honours, decorations, awards and distinctions ==
- Awarded OBE "For services to Publishing and to the Asian Community." New Year's Honours, 31 December 1998
- Awarded CBE "For services to Publishing and to Community Relations." New Year Honours, 30 December 2006
