= Doris (given name) =

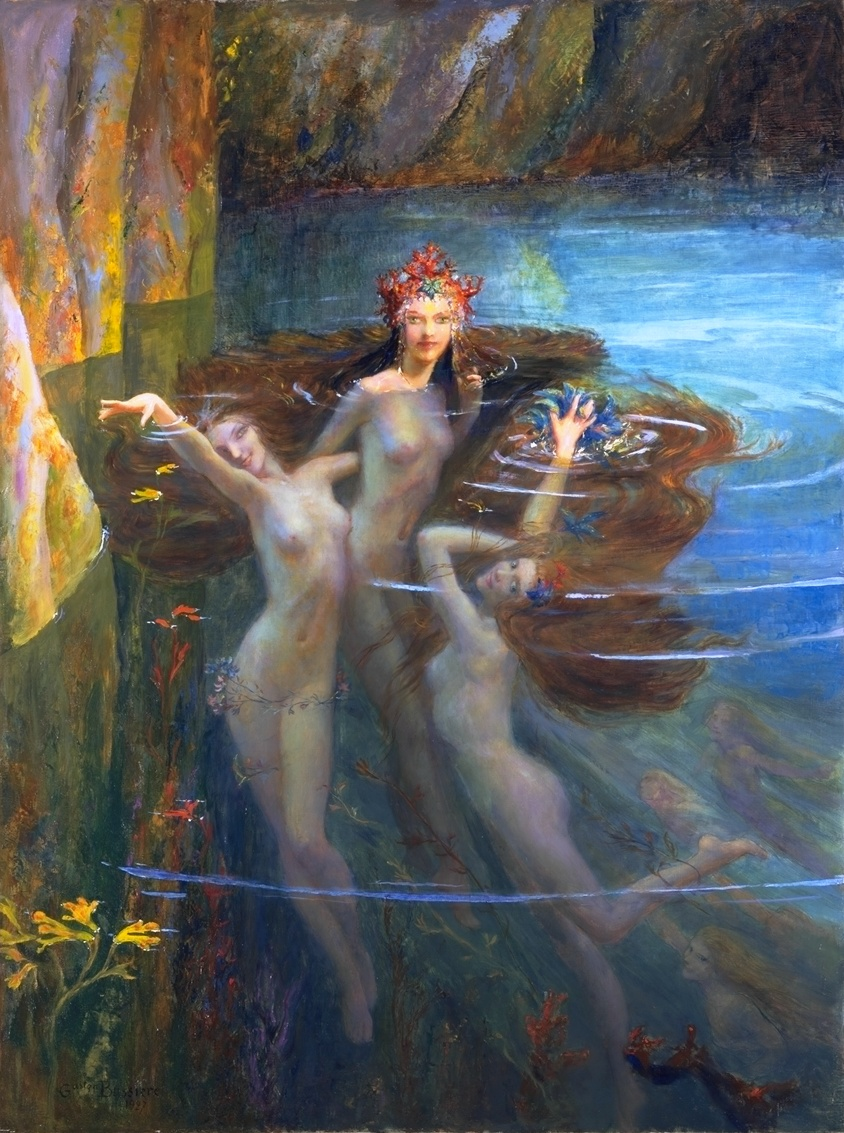
- The Nereides by Gaston Bussière. Doris was the mother of the Nereids, one of whom was also named Doris in Greek mythology.
- Gender: Female
- Language: Greek

Origin
- Meaning: Dorian woman, gift

Other names
- Related names: Dorice, Dorise, Dorris, Dorys, Doryse, Dorrys

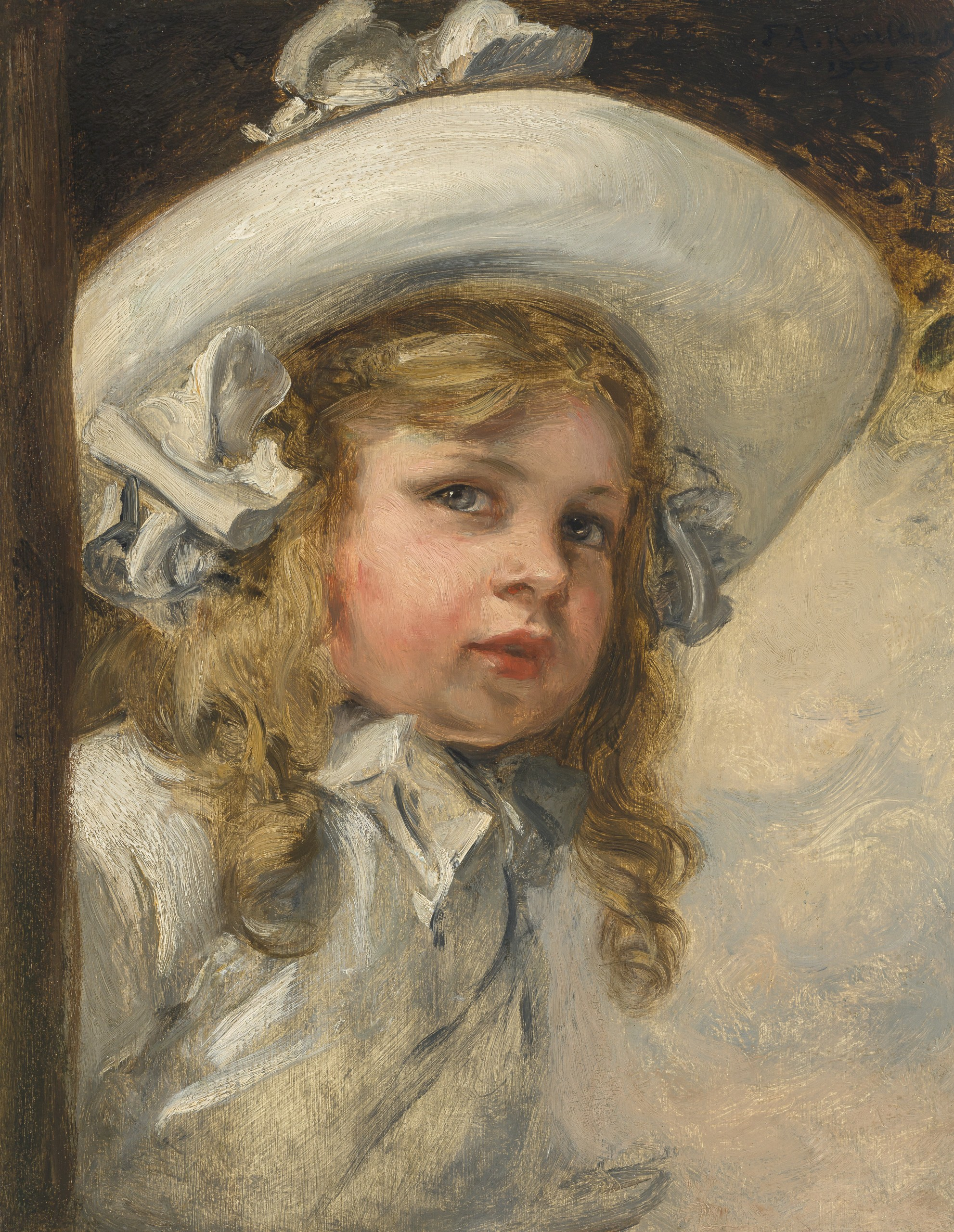
Doris, Daughter of the Artist by Friedrich August von Kaulbach, 1901

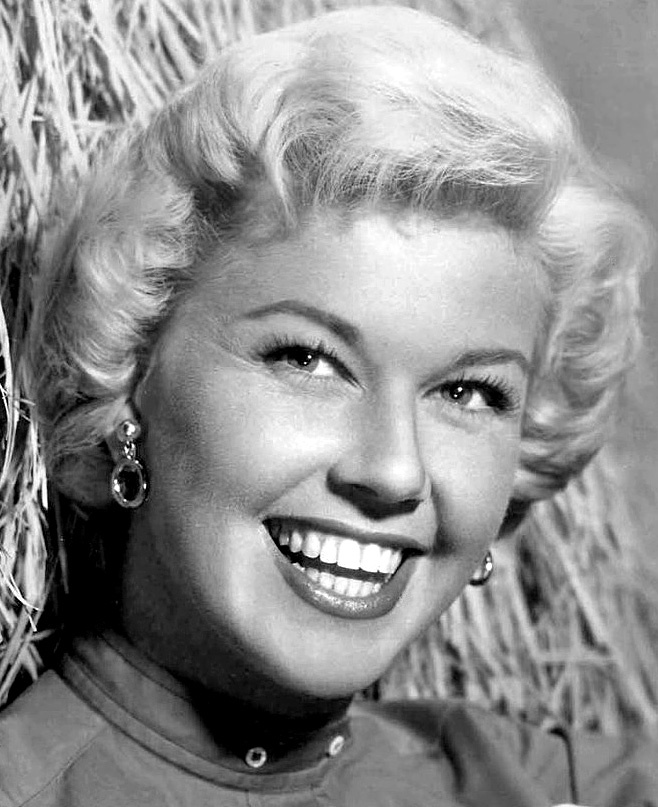
American actress Doris Day

Doris is a predominantly feminine given name of Greek origin meaning Dorian woman. The name of the ethnic group is said to be derived from the name of the mythical founder Dorus, taken from Greek dōron, meaning gift. Doris was a sea goddess, wife of Nereus and mother of the Nereids in Greek mythology.

== Usage ==
As a feminine name, Doris was most popular in the Anglosphere in the late 19th century and early 20th century. It has also been particularly well used in German-speaking countries. The name is also in rare use as a male name. Doris and its spelling variant Dorris is also in use as a surname with different origins than the female given name.

== Women ==
- Doris, first wife of Herod the Great, 1st century Jewish client king
- Doris of Locri, wife of Sicilian tyrant Dionysus I of Syracuse (married c. 406 BC) and mother of Dionysus II of Syracuse

=== A ===
- Doris Abele (1957–2021), German Antarctic marine biologist
- Doris Abeßer (1935–2016), German actress and radio personality
- Doris Abrahams (1921–2009), American theater producer
- Doris E. Abramson (died 2008), American professor, writer, editor and bookstore proprietor
- Doris Achelwilm (born 1976), German journalist and politician
- Louise Doris Adams (1889–1965), British mathematics educator and school inspector
- Doris de Agostini (1958–2020), Swiss alpine skier and Olympian
- Doris Ahnen, German politician
- Doris Akers (1923–1995), American gospel music singer and composer
- Doris Akol (born 1970), Ugandan lawyer and administrator
- Doris Allen (singer), American singer
- Doris Allen (politician) (1936–1999), American politician
- Doris Twitchell Allen (1901–2002), American psychologist and founder of Children's International Summer Villages
- Doris Anderson (1921–2007), Canadian author, journalist, and women's rights activist
- Doris Anderson (screenwriter) (1897–1971), American screenwriter
- Doris Hilda Anderson (1921–2007), Canadian author, journalist, and women's rights activist
- Doris Margaret Anderson (1922–2022), Canadian nutritionist and politician
- Doris Andoni (born 1961), Albanian architect and housing policy expert
- Doris Angleton (1951–1997), American socialite and murder victim
- Doris Anyango (born 1993), Kenyan footballer
- Doris Arnold (1904–1969), British BBC Radio presenter and producer and pianist
- Doris Jean Austin (1949–1994), American author and journalist

=== B ===
- Doris Baaten (born 1956), Dutch voice actress
- Doris Bačić (born 1995), Croatian professional footballer
- Doris Bardsley (1895–1968), British-born Australian nurse
- Doris Barr (1921–2009), American baseball player
- Doris Bartholomew (born 1930), American linguist
- Doris Batter (1929–2002), British sprinter and Olympian
- Doris Beale (1889–1971), British military nurse and nursing administrator
- Doris Beck (1929–2020), American politician
- Doris Beeby (1894–1948), Australian trade unionist
- Doris Beeston (1897–1940), Australian kindergarten teacher
- Doris Belack (1926–2011), American actress
- Doris Marie Bender (1911–1991), American social worker
- Doris Benegas (1951–2016), Spanish lawyer and politician
- Doris Bensimon (1924–2009), Austrian-born French sociologist and academic
- Doris Bergen (born 1960), Canadian academic and Holocaust historian
- Doris Yankelewitz Berger (1934–2016), Costa Rican artist, politician, political activist, member of the National Liberation Party (PLN), and First Lady of Costa Rica from 1982 to 1986
- Doris Betts (1932–2012), American author
- Doris Bigornia (born 1966), Filipina journalist
- Doris Birdsall (1915–2008), British politician
- Doris Bisang (born 1951), Swiss track and field athlete and Olympian
- Doris Bither, American woman who was the subject of a paranormal investigation in 1974
- Doris Blackburn (1889–1970), Australian social reformer and politician
- Doris Blackwell (1891–1983), Australian memoirist
- Doris Blair (1915–2011), British artist
- Doris Blake (gymnast) (1911–1983), British gymnast and Olympian
- Doris Holmes Blake (1892–1978), American entomologist and scientific illustrator
- Doris Blanc (1926–2010), Swiss figure skater
- Doris Bloom (born 1954), South African painter
- Doris Boaduwaa, Ghanaian footballer
- Doris Bohrer (1923–2016), American spy and CIA deputy head of counterintelligence
- Doris Booth (1895–1970), Australian nurse and gold miner
- Doris Boulton-Maude (1892–1961), British artist, notable as a wood engraver, etcher and for her colour woodcut prints
- Doris Boyd (1888–1960), Australian artist, painter and ceramicist
- Doris Bozimo (born 1942), Nigerian librarian, academician and administrator
- Doris Crump Bradshaw (1896–1994), American librarian
- Doris Brett (born 1950), Australian writer and clinical psychologist
- Doris Sophia Brodi (born 1960), Malaysian politician
- Doris Brougham (1926–2024), American-born Taiwanese educator and Christian missionary
- Doris Jocelyn Brown (landscape architect) (1898–1971), Australian writer, landscape designer, and artist
- Doris P. Buck (1898–1980), American science fiction author
- Doris Buffett (1928–2020), American heiress and philanthropist
- Doris Bunte (1933–2021), American politician
- Doris Bures (born 1962), Austrian politician
- Doris Burke (born 1965), American basketball player and broadcaster
- Doris Burn (1923–2011), American children's author and illustrator
- Doris I. Byrne (1905–1975), American lawyer and politician

=== C ===
- Doris Caesar (1892–1971), American sculptor best known for her portrayals of the nude female body
- Doris Emerson Chapman (1903–1990), British artist and prehistorian
- Doris Callebaut (born 1952), Indonesian actress and model
- Doris Calloway (1923–2001), American nutritionist
- Doris Campbell, Austrian cross-country skier and Paralympian
- Doris Mary Cannell (1913–2000), English educator and historian
- Doris Carter (1912–1999), Australian military officer, public servant and high jumper
- Doris Carver (born 1946), American computer scientist, software engineer and academic
- Doris Castle (1942–1998), American civil rights activist
- Doris Castlerosse (1900–1942), English socialite
- Doris Cellar (born 1984), American singer-songwriter
- Doris Davis Centini (1931–2001), American food scientist and home economist
- Doris Chambers (1884–1983), English amateur golfer
- Doris Changeywo (born 1984), Kenyan professional long-distance writer
- Doris Totten Chase (1923–2008), American painter, teacher, and sculptor
- Doris Hargrett Clack (1928–1995), American librarian and academic
- Doris Mable Cochran (1898–1968), American herpetologist and custodian of the American Natural Collection at the Smithsonian Institution
- Doris Cohen, American mathematician and aerodynamicist
- Doris Cole (born 1938), American architect and author
- Doris Coley (1941–2000), American musician
- Doris Bell Collier (1897–1987), British physician and writer who used the pseudonym Josephine Bell
- Doris Collins (1918–2003), British spiritualist and psychic medium
- Doris Cook (born 1931), American former baseball player
- Doris "Dora" Cosens (1894–1945), British architect
- Doris Crane (1911–1999), British sculptor
- Doris Crouse-Mays (born 1958), American labor leader)
- Doris Malkin Curtis (1914–1991), American paleontologist, stratigrapher and geologist

=== D ===
- Doris Dana (1920–2006), American writer and translator
- Doris Daou (born 1964), Lebanese-born Canadian astronomer
- Doris Darlington (died 1998), Jamaican producer
- Doris Dartey (died 2020), Ghanaian educator and journalist
- Doris Davenport (1917–1980), American actress
- Doris Davenport (poet) (born 1949), American writer, educator, and literary and performance poet
- Doris A. Davis (born c. 1935), American politician
- Doris Dawson (1905–1986), American film actress
- Doris E. Day (1872–1966), British archer
- Doris Deane (1901–1974), American actress
- Doris Debenjak (1936–2013), Slovene and Gottschee German linguist and translator
- Doris de Pont (born 1954), New Zealand fashion designer
- Doris Derby (1939–2022), American activist and documentary photographer
- Doris Devrient (1801–1882), German actress and singer
- Doris Dlakude (born 1969), South African politician
- Doris Miles Disney (1907–1976), American mystery writer
- Doris Dörrie (born 1955), German film director, producer and author
- Doris Doscher (1882–1970), American actress and model
- Doris Dowling (1923–2004), American film, stage, and television actress
- Doris Downes (born 1961), American botanical artist, painter of natural history and a writer for the Environmental Governance Institute
- Doris Dragović (born 1961), Yugoslav-Croatian pop singer
- Doris Drought (1899–1976), American film editor and script supervisor
- Doris Dudley (1917–1985), American actress and real estate developer
- Doris Dungey (1961–2008), American blogger
- Doris Duke (1912–1993), American heiress, socialite, horticulturalist, and philanthropist
- Doris Duke (soul singer) (1941–2019), American gospel and soul singer
- Doris Duranti (1917–1995), Italian film actress
- Miriam Dorothy "Doris" Durlacher (1870–1942), Australian nurse and midwife

=== E ===
- Doris Eckert (1915–2005), German hurdler and Olympian
- Doris Egbring-Kahn (1926–2016), German actress
- Doris Emdin (1905–1967), English international table tennis player
- Doris Egan (born 1955), American screenwriter, producer, and writer
- Sister Doris Engelhard, German brewmaster and Catholic nun

=== F ===
- Doris E. Fales (1902–1992), American embryologist
- Doris Felderhoff, American former basketball player
- Doris Marjorie Fielding (1892–1956), British stage and film actress
- Doris Fiala (born 1957), Swiss politician
- Doris Fischer-Colbrie, American ceramic artist and former mathematician
- Doris Fisher, Baroness Fisher of Rednal (1919–2005), British politician
- Doris Fisher (songwriter) (1915–2003), American songwriter
- Doris F. Fisher (born 1931), American billionaire businesswoman
- Doris Fitton (1897–1985), Australian actress, director, and producer
- Doris Fleeson (1901–1970), American journalist and newspaper columnist
- Doris Fleischman (1891–1980), American writer, public relations executive, and feminist activist
- Doris Kathleen Flinn (1892–1977), English sculptor
- Doris F. Brooks, Guamanian accountant, former bank executive and politician
- Doris Frankel (1909–1994), American playwright, poet, radio show writer and television show writer
- Doris Freedman (1928–1981), American arts activist and administrator
- Doris Fuchs (born 1938), American gymnast and Olympian
- Doris Fuchs (scientist) (born 1966), German political scientist and academic
- Doris Fuller (died 1962), American competitive bridge player and teacher

=== G ===
- Doris Pilkington Garimara (1937–2014), Australian author
- Doris Gates (1901–1987), American writer of realistic children's fiction
- Doris Gentile (1894–1972), Australian novelist and short story writer
- Doris Gercke (1937–2025), German writer of crime thrillers
- Doris Gibson (1910–2008), Peruvian magazine writer and publisher
- Doris Gilbert (1914–1993), American screenwriter and television writer
- Doris Giller (1931–1993), Canadian journalist
- Doris Gluth (born 1955), German middle distance runner and Olympian
- Doris Goddard (1930–2019), German model, a copywriter, journalist and photographer
- Doris Gontersweiler-Vetterli (born 1933), Swiss former backstroke swimmer and Olympian
- Doris Goodale (1949–2020), American politician
- Doris Ann Goodchild (1906–1999), British lecturer, writer, artist, illustrator and charity fundraise
- Doris Gordon (1890–1956), New Zealand doctor, university lecturer, obstetrician and women's health reformer
- Doris Graber (1923–2018), American political scientist
- Doris Grant (née Cruikshank) (1905–2003), British nutritionist and food writer
- Doris Grau (1924–1995), American actress and script supervisor
- Doris Gregory (1921–2023), Canadian author and activist
- Doris M. Green (1904–1999), British philatelist
- Doris Grimes (1909–1987), British diver and Olympian
- Doris Große (1884–?), German artists' model
- Doris Grove, American world record breaking glider pilot, flight instructor and a member of the U.S. Soaring Hall of Fame
- Doris Grumbach (1918–2022), American novelist, memoirist, biographer, literary critic and essayist
- Doris Gunnarsson (born 1945), Swedish journalist and politician
- Doris Günther (born 1978), Austrian snowboarder
- Doris Gutiérrez (born 1947), Honduran lawyer and politician

=== H ===
- Doris Haas (born 1964), German former archer
- Doris Haddock (1910–2010), American political activist
- Doris Hanson (1925–2006), American realtor, politician, and public administrator
- Doris Harcourt (1900–1981), English socialite
- Doris Hare (1905–2000), British actress, comedian, singer and dancer
- Doris Hart (1925–2015), American tennis player
- Doris Haselrieder, Italian luger
- Doris Brabham Hatt (1890–1969), British painter and printmaker
- Doris Holt Hauman (1898–1984), American illustrator of children's books
- Doris Håvik (1924–2009), Swedish politician
- Sorrel Hays, born Doris Hays (1941–2020), American pianist, composer, filmmaker and artist
- Doris Hedges (1896–1972), Canadian writer
- Doris Gwendoline Helliwell (1895–1952), South African concert pianist
- C. Doris Hellman (1910–1973), American historian of science
- Mayda Doris Henderson (1928–2015), South African botanist, phytogeographer, and taxonomist
- Doris Brown Heritage (born 1942), American coach and runner
- Doris Heyden (1905–2005), American scholar of pre-Columbian Mesoamerican cultures
- Doris Hill, born Roberta Hill (1905–1976), American film actress
- Doris Hopp (1930–1998), Swedish brothel madam
- Doris Houck (1921–1965), American model and actress known professionally as Doris Colleen
- Doris Howell (1923–2019), American physician who specialized in pediatric oncology
- Doris Kristina Hugosson (born 1963), Swedish cross country skier
- Doris Humphrey (1895–1958), American dancer and choreographer
- Doris Hursley (1898–1984), American screenwriter

=== I ===
- Doris Funnye Innis (1933–2015), American writer, editor, and educator

=== J ===
- Doris Jacob (born 1981), Nigerian sprinter
- Doris Jadan (1925–2004), Virgin Islands environmentalist, teacher, author, and journalist
- Doris Jakubec (born 1939), Francophone Swiss professor of Suisse romande literature
- Doris Bernice Jensen (1922–2015), American actress who used the stage name Coleen Gray
- Doris J. Jensen (born 1978), Greenlandic politician
- Doris Johnson (1923–2021), American politician
- Doris Sands Johnson (1921–1983), Bahamian teacher, suffragette and politician
- Doris Jones (archer) (born 1988), Canadian archer
- Doris Jones (baseball) (born 1924), American former baseball player
- Doris Jones (politician), American politician
- Doris Egerton Jones (1889–1973), Australian writer
- Doris W. Jones (1913–2006), American ballet dancer and dance instructor
- Doris de Jong (1902–1991), Dutch fencer
- Doris Jørns (1915–2013), Norwegian serial and romantic pulp writer

=== K ===
- Doris Kareva (born 1958), Estonian poet and translator
- Doris Karpiel (born 1935), American businesswoman and politician
- Doris Keane (1881–1945), American actress
- Doris Kearns Goodwin (born 1943), American journalist, biographer and historian
- Doris Kelley, American politician
- Doris Kenyon (1897–1979), American motion picture and television actress
- Doris Keogh (1922–2012), Irish flautist and flute teacher
- Doris Kermack (1923–2003), British paleontologist and marine zoologist
- Doris Boake Kerr (1889–1944), Australian writer who published under the pen name Capel Boake
- Caroline Doris Ketelbey (1896–1990), British historian and academic
- Doris Kilias (1942–2008), German Arabist and literary translator
- Doris Kirchner (1930–2015), Austrian stage, film and television actress
- Doris Kirkman (1930–2010), American gymnast and Olympian
- Doris Stuart Kngwarreye (born c. 1940), Australian Aboriginal senior traditional owner for Mparntwe (Alice Springs)
- Doris Kohardt (born 1950), German Olympic swimmer
- Doris Köhler (born 1975), Austrian kickboxer and boxer
- Doris König (born 1957), German judge, jurisprudent and public law scholar who serves as the Vice President of the Federal Constitutional Court of Germany
- Doris Kotzan (born 1931), American burlesque dancer who performed as Bambi Jones
- Doris Kresimon (born 1955), German former footballer
- Doris Kristanel (1946–1975), Austrian film actress who performed using the stage name Krista Nell
- Doris Kuhlmann-Wilsdorf (1922–2010), German metallurgist
- Doris Kunstmann (born 1944), German actress

=== L ===
- Doris Laine (1931–2018), Finnish ballet dancer
- Doris Langer (born 1938), East German high jumper
- Doris Leader Charge (1930–2001), American translator and editor
- Doris Lee (1905–1983), American painter
- Doris Marie Leeper (1929–2000), American sculptor and painter
- Doris Leslie (1891–1982), British novelist and historical biographer
- Doris Lessing (1919–2013), British-Zimbabwean novelist
- Doris Lester (1886–1965), British community center founder
- Doris Leuthard (born 1963), Swiss politician and lawyer
- Doris E. Lewis (1911–1985), Canadian university librarian
- Doris Lilly (1926–1991), American newspaper columnist and writer
- Doris Lindner (1896–1979), British sculptor
- Doris Ling-Cohan, American judge
- Doris Troth Lippman, American nurse and academic
- Doris Littrell (1929–2020), American gallerist
- Doris Lloyd (1891–1968), English-American stage and film actress
- Doris Lo (1952–2006), Hong Kong voice actor
- Doris Lockness (1910–2017), American aviator
- Doris Lorenz-Müller (1935–2013), German track and field athlete and Olympian
- Doris Löve (1918–2000), Swedish systematic botanist
- Doris Lusk (1916–1990), New Zealand painter, potter, art teacher, and university lecturer
- Doris Lytton (1893–1953), English stage and film actress and businesswoman

=== M ===
- Doris Mackinnon (1883–1956), British zoologist
- Doris Mader (born 1976), Austrian table tennis player
- Doris Magee (1907–2002), Australian sprinter and sports administrator
- Doris Mahalick (1924–2008), American politician and Democratic Party official
- Doris Maletzki (born 1952), East German sprinter
- Doris Malloy (1901–1955), American screenwriter
- Doris Schetrompf Maphis (1922–2021), American country singer who performed under the stage name Rose Lee Maphis
- Doris Marmon (born and died 1896), English child murder victim
- Doris Marsh, American baseball player
- Doris Matsui (born 1944), American politician
- Doris McCarthy (1910–2010), Canadian artist
- Doris Evans McGinty (died 2005), American academic
- Doris McKellar (1897–1984), Australian photographer
- Doris McLemore (1927–2016), American teacher who was the last native speaker of the Wichita language
- Doris McRae (1893–1988), Australian schoolteacher, headmistress and women's activist
- Doris Meissner (born 1941), American government official
- Doris Meister (born 1952), German former competitive swimmer and Olympian
- Doris Meltzer (1908–1977), American artist and art dealer
- Doris Meltzer (handballer) (born 1973), Austrian handball player
- Doris Rosetta Elizabeth Mendoza (1899–1986), Australian pianist and theatre director
- Doris Merrick (1919–2019), American film actress and model
- Doris Honig Merritt (1923–2022), American physician and the first woman to serve on a board for the National Library of Medicine
- Doris Metaxa (1911–2007), French tennis player
- Doris Denise Milner (1967–1977), American murder victim
- Doris Miner (born 1936), American former politician
- Doris M. Modly (1933–2018), Yugoslav-born American academic and health care administrator
- Doris Molesworth (1902–1976), British competitive swimmer and Olympian
- Dóris Monteiro (1934–2023), Brazilian singer and actress
- Doris Langley Moore (1902–1989), British fashion historian
- Doris Morales Martínez (born 1959), Uruguayan lawyer and a minister of the Supreme Court of Uruguay
- Doris Morf (1927–2003), Swiss author, journalist and politician
- Doris Mortimer (1898–1947), British stockbroker
- Doris Mühringer (1920–2009), Austrian poet, short story writer and children's writer
- Doris Kopsky Muller (1922–1997), American cyclist

=== N ===
- Doris Neal (1928–2012), American baseball player
- Dorothy "Doris" Nelson Neal (1908–1982), British coach and athletic official
- Doris Nefedov (1942–1969), German singer who performed under the stage name Alexandra
- Doris Anita Neil (born 1950), British sprinter
- Doris Neuner (born 1971), Austrian luger
- Doris Ryer Nixon (1893–1948), American civic leader
- Doris Nnadi, Nigerian gospel musician, singer and songwriter who performs as Dee Doris
- Doris Ngcengwane (born 1947), South African politician
- Doris Niles (1905–1998), American dancer
- Doris Nolan (1916–1998), American actress
- Doris Norton, Italian pioneer of electronic and computer music
- Doris Bush Nungarrayi (born c. 1942), Australian Aboriginal artist

=== O ===
- Doris Odlum (1890–1985), English psychiatrist
- Doris Lyne Officer (1898–1967), English-Australian physician and pediatrician
- Doris Ogilvie (1919–2012), Canadian judge and activist
- Doris Ogilvie (diver) (1912–2003), Canadian diver
- Doris Olafsdóttir (born 1986), Faroese former footballer
- Doris Orgel (1929–2021), Austrian-born American children's literature author
- Doris Mae Oulton (born 1945), Canadian advocate for women's rights

=== P ===
- Doris Pack (born 1942), German politician
- Doris Packer (1904–1979), American actress
- Doris Palmer (1898–1993), New Zealand clerical worker, political activist and welfare worker
- Doris Parkes (1905–?), Canadian multi-sport athlete
- Doris Patiño (born 1986), Colombian taekwondo practitioner
- Doris Pawn (1894–1988), American silent film actress
- Doris L. Payne (born 1952), American linguist and academic
- Doris Pecher (born 1966), German diver and Olympian
- Doris Peick (1933–2012), American politician
- Doris Petrie (1918–2000), Canadian film and television actress
- Doris Petroni (born 1941), Argentine choreographer, dancer, and dance teacher
- Doris Piché (born 1965), Canadian badminton player
- Doris Pinčić (born 1988), Croatian actress
- Doris Piserchia (1928–2021), American science fiction writer
- Doris Swords Poppler (1924–2004), American attorney
- Doris Posch (born 1973), Austrian track and road cyclist
- Doris Preindl (born 1977), Italian luger and Olympian
- Doris Pryor (born 1977), American lawyer and circuit judge

=== Q ===
- Doris M. Quinn (1923–2003), American politician

=== R ===
- Doris Raab (1851–1933), German etcher and engraver
- Doris Ramseier (born 1939), Swiss equestrian
- Doris Rankin (1887–1947), American stage and film actress
- Doris "Dora" Knowlton Ranous (1859–1916), American actress, author, editor, translator and book reviewer
- Doris Reisinger (born 1983), German philosopher, theologian and former nun
- Doris Rhodes (1898–1982), British competitive bridge player
- Doris Reynolds (1899–1985), British geologist
- Doris Ríos, Costa Rican human rights activist
- Doris Roberts (1925–2016), American actress
- Doris Rogers (1929–2016), Guyanese academic who specialized in fine arts
- Doris Patty Rosenthal (1889–1971), American painter, printmaker, designer and educator
- Doris Ruby (1927–1951), American dancer and nightclub entertainer
- Doris Magaly Ruiz (born 1941), Cuban musician and composer
- Doris Runge (born 1943), German writer

=== S ===
- Doris Salcedo (born 1958), Colombian sculptor
- Doris Sams (1927–2012), American baseball player
- Doris Satterfield (1926–1993), American baseball player
- Doris Saunders (1941–2006), Canadian editor
- Doris E. Saunders (1921–2014), American librarian, author, editor, businesswoman, and academic
- Doris Schachner (1904–1988), German academic
- Doris Schade (1924–2012), German actress
- Doris Scharfenberg (1917–2009), American television producer
- Doris Schattschneider (born 1939), American mathematician
- Doris Schmidauer (born 1963), Austrian environmentalist and Green Party official
- Doris Schoettler-Boll (1945–2015), German artist
- Doris von Schönthan (1905–1961), German model, a copywriter, journalist and photographer
- Doris Schroeder (1893–1981), American screenwriter and publicist
- Doris Schröder-Köpf (born 1963), German journalist and politician
- Doris Schubach (1924–2003), American figure skater
- Doris Schwaiger (born 1985), Austrian beach volleyball player
- Doris Schweizer (born 1989), Swiss racing cyclist
- Doris Seale (1936–2017), American poet, writer, educator and librarian
- Doris Seidler (1912–2010), English painter, printmaker and graphic artist
- Doris Asibi Seidu (1961–2009), Ghanaian educationist, social worker and politician
- Doris K. Miller (1922–2015), American clinical psychologist and peace activist
- Doris Self (1925–2006), American video game competitor, the world's oldest competitive videogamer
- Doris Shadbolt (1918–2003), Canadian art historian, author, curator, cultural bureaucrat, educator and philanthropist
- Doris Gertrude Sheppard (1902–1982), English-born New Zealand pianist, singer, composer and teacher
- Doris Sikosana (1942–2023), South African politician and former anti-apartheid activist
- Doris Simeon (born 1979), Nigerian Yoruba and English actress
- Doris Singleton (1919–2012), born Dorthea, American actress
- Doris Slater (1917–1964), Canadian cartoonist, painter, and art teacher
- Doris A. "Toukie" Smith (born 1952), American actress and model
- Doris Buchanan Smith (1934–2002), American children's author
- Doris Ione Smith (1932–2015), American actress known by the stage name Donna Douglas
- Doris E. Smith (1919-before 1994), Irish writer of gothic and romance novels
- Doris Ives Smith (1888–1951), British writer who used the pen name Catherine Ives
- Doris Smith-Ribner (born 1945), American former judge
- Ruby Doris Smith-Robinson (1942–1967), American civil rights activist
- Doris Soffel (born 1948), German mezzo-soprano
- Doris Soliz (born 1958), Ecuadoran politician
- Doris Sommer (born 1947), American literature scholar
- Doris Speed (1899–1994), English actress
- Doris Spiegel (1901–1996), American artist known for her magazine and book illustrations as well as her etchings
- Doris Meth Srinivasan, German-born academic in the United States
- Doris Mary Stenton (1894–1971), English historian of the Middle Ages
- Doris Stevens (1888–1963), American suffragist, women's legal rights advocate and author
- Doris Stocker (1886–1968), British actress and singer
- Doris Stockhausen (1924–2023), German piano teacher who was the early muse and first wife of Karlheinz Stockhausen
- Doris Stockton (1924–2018), American mathematician
- Doris Stokes (1920–1987), British spiritualist, professional medium, and author
- Doris Zemurray Stone (1909–1994), American archaeologist and ethnographer
- Doris Strachan (1917–1974), New Zealand track and field athlete
- Doris June Struble (1895–1976), American pianist, singer and dramatic reader
- Doris Sung (born 1964), American architect and educator of Korean descent
- Doris Svedlund (1926–1985), Swedish film actress
- Doris Svensson (1947–2023), stage name Doris (singer), Swedish rock and pop singer

=== T ===
- Doris Tate (1924–1992), American activist for the rights of crime victims
- Doris Taufateau (born 1987), New Zealand female rugby union leader
- Doris Taylor, American scientist working in regenerative medicine and tissue engineering
- Doris Irene Taylor (1901–1968), Australian social services activist
- Doris Tetzlaff (1921–1998), American baseball player
- Doris Thalmer (1907–1998), German actress
- Doris Thompson (1903–2004), British businesswoman
- Doris Thompson (swimmer) (1909–1983), Australian swimmer
- Doris Tomasini (born 1984), Italian sprinter
- Doris Trachsel (born 1984), Swiss cross-country skier
- Doris Eaton Travis (1904–2010), American dancer, stage and film actress, dance instructor, owner and manager, writer and rancher
- Doris Troy (1937–2004), American R&B singer and songwriter
- Doris Trueman (born 1953), British cross-country skier and Olympian
- Doris Tsao, Chinese-American neuroscientist and academic
- Doris Turner (cricketer) (1908–1986), English cricketer and umpire
- Doris Turner (politician), American politician
- Doris Tutill (1916–2010), New Zealand artist and Anglican priest

=== U ===
- Doris Uboh-Ogunkoya (born 1964), Nigerian politician
- Doris Ulmann (1882–1934), American photographer
- Doris Uzoka-Anite (born 1981), Nigerian politician, medical doctor and financial expert

=== V ===
- Doris Vaughan (1894–1975), British painter
- Doris Veillette (1935–2019), Canadian Quebecois journalist
- Doris Vickers (born 1980), Austrian archaeoastronomer and content manager for the Unesco Portal to the Heritage of Astronomy

=== W ===
- Doris Wagner (scientist), American biologist and academic
- Doris "Dobby" Walker (1919–2009), American labor lawyer
- Doris Wanjala (1966–2007), Kenyan female volleyball player and Olympian
- Doris Waters (1899–1978), English comic actress and singer
- Doris Weatherford, American author and historian
- Doris Martha Weber (1898–1984), American photographer
- Doris Wegener (1943–2001, German singer who performed as Manuela
- Doris Brennan Weir, American educator and former competitive swimmer
- Doris Wells (1943–1988), Venezuelan actress, writer and producer
- Doris L. Wethers (1927–2019), American pediatrician known for her research on sickle-cell disease
- Doris Gnauck White (1926–2001), American science educator
- Doris Pike White (1896–1987), American investment banker and civic leader
- Doris Y. Wilkinson (born 1936), American sociologist
- Doris Willens (1924–2021), American singer-songwriter, journalist, advertising executive and author
- Doris Willette (born 1988), American foil fencer and Olympian
- Doris Wiredu (born 1964), Ghanaian female track and field athlete and Olympian
- Doris Wishman (1912–2002), American film director, screenwriter, and producer
- Doris Witiuk (1929–2014), Canadian baseball player
- Doris Woods (1902–1956), British gymnast and Olympian

=== Y ===
- Doris Younane (born 1963), Australian stage and screen actress

=== Z ===
- Doris Ziegler (born 1949), German painter
- Doris Zinkeisen (1897–1991), Scottish theatrical stage and costume designer, painter, commercial artist and writer

=== Stage name ===
- Doris D, British singer and dancer Debbie Jenner (born 1959)
- Doris Day, American singer, actress and animal welfare advocate Doris Kappelhoff (1922–2019)
- Dorsha Hayes, American stage actress and dancer Doris Bentley (1897–1990)
- Doris May, American silent film actress Helen Garrett (1902–1984)

== Men ==
- Doris Fuakumputu (born 1986), Congolese footballer
- Doris Kelenc (born 1986), Slovenian-born footballer in Austria
- Doris Lussier (1918–1993), French Canadian comedian and actor, and political activist
- Doris Leon "D.L." Menard (1932–2017), American songwriter, performer, and recording artist in contemporary Cajun music
- Doris Miller (1919–1943), U.S. Navy sailor, first black recipient of the Navy Cross for his actions during the attack on Pearl Harbor

== Fictional characters ==
- Doris the Ugly Stepsister, in the Shrek film series
