= Hilyer =

Hilyer is a surname. It may refer to:

- Amanda Gray Hilyer (1870–1957), African American entrepreneur, pharmacist, civic worker, and civil rights activist
- Andrew F. Hilyer (1858–1925), American lawyer, businessman, real estate investor, activist and inventor
- Mamie Hilyer (1863–1916), African American pianist
