= Doris Smith =

Doris Smith may refer to:

- Doris Ives Smith (1888–1951), British cookery book author writing under the name Catherine Ives
- Doris Buchanan Smith (1934–2002), American children's book author
- Doris E. Smith (1919–?), Irish writer of gothic and romance novels
- Donna Douglas (1932–2015), née Doris Smith, American actress and comedienne
- Toukie Smith (1952-2026), née Doris Smith, American actress and model
- Doris Smith-Ribner, née Doris Smith, American judge
