= Scharfenberg =

Scharfenberg (German pronunciation: [ˈʃaʁfn̩ˌbɛʁk]) may refer to:

- Conrad III of Scharfenberg
- Scharfenberger chocolate
- Scharfenberg coupler, a type of railway coupling

== People with the surname Scharfenberg ==
- Doris Scharfenberg
- Jean Scharfenberg (1922-1998), American professor of theatre

== See also ==
- Scharfenberg Castle (disambiguation)
