= Ogunkoya =

Ògúnkọ̀yà
- Gender: Male
- Language: Yoruba

Origin
- Origin: Nigerian
- Meaning: Ògún has rejected (our) suffering.
- Region of origin: South West, Nigeria

Ògúnkọ̀yà audio is a Nigerian surname. It is a male name and of Yoruba origin, which means "Ògún has rejected (our) suffering". Ògún is the Yorùbá god of iron. The name Ògúnkọ̀yà is a unique and culturally significant name and primarily used among the families of Ògún devotees.

== Notable individuals with the name ==
- Falilat Ogunkoya (born 1968), Nigerian athlete
- Seun Ogunkoya (born 1977), Nigerian sprinter
- Kola Ogunkoya (born 1967), Nigerian musician
- Paul Ogunkoya (born 2004) is a Nigerian professional footballer
- Doris Uboh-Ogunkoya (born 1964), Nigerian politician
