= Modly =

Modly is a surname. Notable people with the surname include:

- Doris M. Modly (1933–2018), South African health official
- Thomas Modly (born 1960), American businessman and government official
