= Mamie Hilyer =

African American pianist (1863–1916)

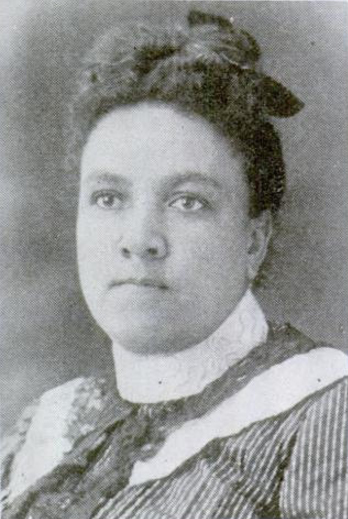
- Born: Mamie Elizabeth Nichols; 20 December 1863; Washington D.C.
- Died: 14 December 1916 (aged 52); Washington D.C.
- Resting place: Columbian Harmony Cemetery
- Occupations: Pianist, promoter of classical music
- Organization(s): Treble Clef Club; the Samuel Coleridge-Taylor Choral Society
- Spouse: Andrew F. Hilyer (m. 1886)

Mamie Hilyer (née Nichols; 20 December 1863 – 14 December 1916) was an African American pianist and promoter of classical music, who founded the Treble Clef Club (1897) and the Samuel Coleridge-Taylor Choral Society (1901) in Washington D.C., playing a significant role in nurturing the district's musical culture.

== Early life ==
Mamie Elizabeth Nichols was born in the District of Columbia on 20 December 1863. She married Andrew Franklin Hilyer, a businessman, author, and civil rights leader in 1886. The couple had a son, Gale Pillsbury Hilyer, born on 15 April 1891. Gale Hilyer attended Howard University, followed by the University of Minnesota, graduating in 1912 and becoming a lawyer. He helped to establish an NAACP branch in Minneapolis. The Hilyers also had a daughter, Kathleen.

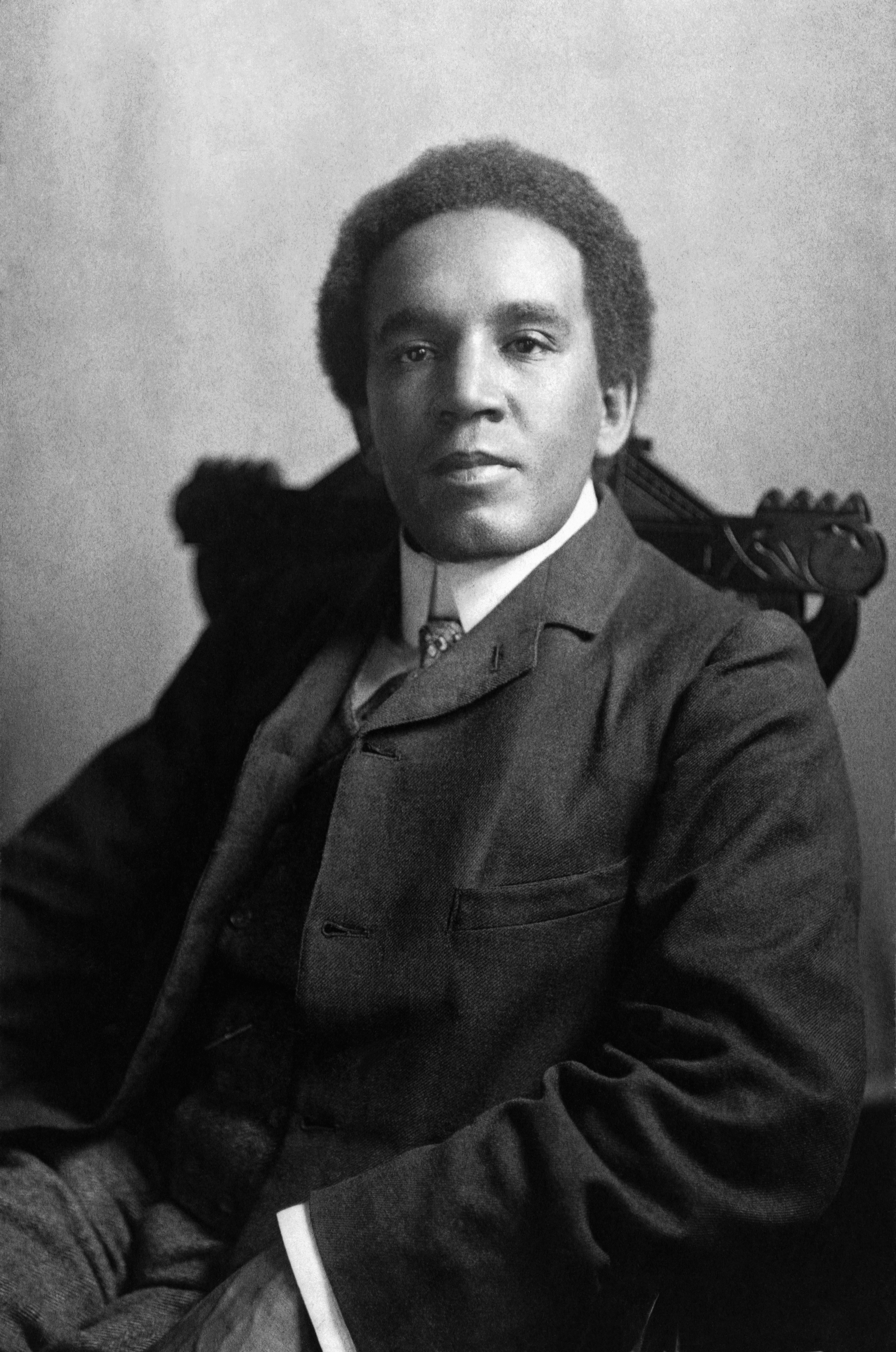
Musician and composer Samuel Coleridge-Taylor

== The Treble Clef Club ==
In 1897, Hilyer founded the Treble Clef Club: an 'important group that offered leadership in the community by presenting annual concerts and encouraging young musicians'. The group brought together professional women musicians and teachers of music, interested in study and self-development. Hilyer herself described it in 1900 as 'a small band of married women who are music lovers'. Another founding member was Harriet Gibbs Marshall.

With an emphasis on Black composers, the Treble Clef Club sought to bring the 'best music' to the community, becoming nationally lauded for their success. In Cultivating Music in America, Doris Evans McGinty describes the group as being 'probably an outgrowth of the black women's club movement':

which was solidified with the founding of the National Association of Colored Women (NACW) in 1896. The motto of the NACW, "Lifting as We Climb," was important to black women. The implied commitment to social welfare programs and self-development became the raison d'être for the establishment not only of clubs but also of educational institutions in the early twentieth century.

Its annual public recital was 'the only high-class musical entertainment that was given free in the city of Washington at that time'. In 1961, while still active, the Treble Clef club was described as having 'made notable contributions to the cultural life of Washington, D.C., during its long lifetime'.

== The Samuel Coleridge-Taylor Choral Society ==
It was Mamie Hilyer's idea to form, in 1901, the Samuel Coleridge-Taylor Choral Society, having met Coleridge-Taylor - a renowned Black British composer, conductor, and violinist - on an overseas trip, a meeting facilitated by Frederick J. Loudin. On her return to the United States, she set enthusiastically about establishing a choral group who might perform Coleridge-Taylor's compositions, including promoting and fundraising for the Society through piano performances and other efforts. The Treble Clef Club helped to generate public interest and to raised funds through activities including musical teas and salons. Hilyer, Emma Williams, Josephine Ball, and Amanda Gray formed the Chibiabos Quartet, a reference to Longfellow's 'The Song of Hiawatha'.

The Samuel Coleridge-Taylor Choral Society numbered between 160 and 200 voices, generating praise from local and national African American newspapers, and welcoming multi-racial audiences, which were sometimes so large that people had to be turned away. The group had hoped from the beginning to invite Coleridge-Taylor to Washington and, in 1904, Coleridge-Taylor travelled from London to conduct the society in performing his cantata Hiawatha's Wedding Feast. His public praise for accompanist Mary Europe played a significant role in enhancing her reputation, and diversifying her audience within Washington's musical circles.

== Death ==
Mamie Hilyer died on 14 December 1916. Her death was reported in Minneapolis paper The Appeal as being 'rather sudden, following a supposed successful operation several weeks ago.' It noted Hilyer's prominent role in the 'musical life of the capitol'.
