= Peick =

Peick is a surname. Notable people with the surname include:

- Doris Peick (1933–2012), American politician
- Jens Peick (born 1981), German trade unionist and politician
