= Scharrenberg =

Scharrenberg is a surname. Notable people with the surname include:

- Mark Scharrenberg (born 1969), American rugby union player
- Paul Scharrenberg (1877–1969), German-American labor leader

== See also ==
- Scharfenberg (disambiguation)
