= Wilsdorf =

Wilsdorf is a surname. Notable people with the surname include:

- Doris Kuhlmann-Wilsdorf (1922–2010), German metallurgist
- Hans Wilsdorf (1881–1960), German watchmaker and founder of Rolex
