= Doris Green =

Doris Green may refer to:

- Doris M. Green (1904–1999), British philatelist
- Doris Roberts (born Doris May Green 1925–2016), American character actress
