= Doris Hall =

Doris Hall may refer to:

- Doris McKellar, Australian photographer, born Doris Hall
- Doris Hall (artist), enamellist and wife of Kálmán Kubinyi
