= Doris Vaughan =

British artist

Doris Vaughan (1894–1975) was a British painter who primarily exhibited works during the 1930s.

== Career ==
Vaughan first exhibited a landscape painting at Belgrave St Ives Gallery in 1919.

Vaughan went on to have solo exhibitions at Wertheim Gallery, located in London, in both 1934 and 1937.

In 1939, Vaughan exhibited her works at Wertheim Gallery for a third time in an exhibition titled "Un-Professional Painters" accompanied by the works of the Ashington Group.

== Personal life ==
Doris Vaughan married painter Colin Sealy, whose works were often featured in exhibitions alongside Vaughan's. Vaughan spent most of her married life with Sealy in St Ives, a town in Cornwall, England, often using the town and its inhabitants as inspiration and subjects.
