= Dorice =

Dorice is a feminine given name and surname.

== People with the given name ==
- Dorice Fordred (1902–1980), South African actress
- Dorice Moore, American convicted murderer
- Dorice Reid (1943–2011), Cook Islander tourism official and businesswoman
- Dorice Reid (baseball) (1929–2017), American outfielder
- Dorice Constance Brown Walford (born 1924), Canadian architect

== People with the surname ==
- Danièle Dorice (1935–2018), Canadian singer and teacher

== See also ==
- Doris (given name)
