= Doris M. Quinn =

American politician

Member of the Missouri House of Representatives from the 40th district
- In office 1975–1976

Personal details
- Born: July 15, 1923 Independence, Missouri
- Died: May 22, 2003 (aged 79) Blue Springs, Missouri
- Party: Democratic
- Spouse(s): Jack E. Quinn, married June 6, 1948
- Children: 2 sons
- Education: University of Missouri-Columbia School of Journalism
- Occupation: politician
- Profession: journalism, manager

Doris Marilyn Allison Quinn (July 15, 1923 – May 22, 2003) was an American politician who served as a Missouri state representative. She was first elected in 1974, but she only served one term in the state legislature after losing the Democratic Party primary in 1976. She was a former member of the Missouri State Women's Political Caucus, the Greater Kansas City Women's Political Caucus, the Missouri ERA Coalition, the Missouri Women's Campaign Fund, and a member of the American Association of University Women. She helped found the Women's Political Caucus in Missouri in 1972.

Quinn was born in Independence, Missouri, to Earnest Hayes and Ethel Marie Ferman Allison. She attended Northeast High School in Kansas City and graduated from the University of Missouri-Columbia School of Journalism. She married Jack E. Quinn on June 6, 1948, in Sugar Creek, Missouri. He preceded her in death. Mrs. Quinn previously worked at the Remington Arms Company and at the Army Ammunition Plant in Independence, Missouri, and as the manager of administrative services for H&R Block for seven years.
