= Doris Schachner =

German mineralogist (1904–1988)

Photograph of Doris Schachner (fair use only)

Doris (Elfriede) Schachner (née Korn; 30 May 1904 in Bockwa near Zwickau – 1 April 1988 in Heidelberg) was the first female German professor for Mineralogy and Honorary Senator of the RWTH Aachen University.

== Life ==
Schachner studied mineralogy at the universities in Heidelberg, Freiburg i. Br., and Innsbruck. She completed her doctorate at the Heidelberg University in 1928 and she completed her habilitation at the TH Aachen in 1933. From 1933 to 1940, she was a lecturer at the TH Aachen. At the end of the second world war (from 1941 to 1945), she worked at the Brno University of Technology. In 1946, she returned to Aachen. In 1948, she became an extraordinary professor at the TH Aachen. From 1949 to 1972, she was an ordinary professor at the TH Aachen. Based on her initiative, the Institute of Crystallography at the TH Aachen was founded in 1963. In 1984, she became an Honorary Senator at the TH Aachen. Her daughter Melitta Schachner Camartin was a professor for neurobiology at the University of Hamburg.

== Research ==
Schachner was a pioneer in ore microscopy.

== Awards ==
She was an Honorary Senator of the RWTH Aachen University. Two minerals are named after her: Schachnerite and Para-Schachnerite. A street in Aachen is named after her.

== Selected publications ==
- Korn, Doris (1928). Tektonische und gefügeanalytische Untersuchungen im Grundgebirge des Böllsteiner Odenwaldes. Heidelberg: Schweizerbart.
- Schachner-Korn, Doris (1948-07-01). "Ein metamorphes Erzgefüge". Heidelberger Beiträge zur Mineralogie und Petrographie (in German). 1 (4): 407–426. Bibcode:1948BeiMP...1..407S. doi:10.1007/BF01104123. ISSN 1432-0967.
- Schachner-Korn, Doris (1954-03-01). "Ein Wachstums- und ein Rekristallisationsgefüge von Bleiglanz aus einer rheinischen Lagerstätte". Tschermaks Mineralogische und Petrographische Mitteilungen (in German). 4 (1–4): 111–116. Bibcode:1954MinPe...4..111S. doi:10.1007/BF01140381. ISSN 1438-1168.
