= Doris Brennan Weir =

American swimmer (1921–1988)

Doris Brennan Weir (May 10, 1921 – October 13, 1988) was an American swimmer.

== Biography ==
Weir was born in Providence, Rhode Island. She graduated from Sargent College in 1942 and later taught at Classical High School and the University of New Hampshire.

Weir began training at the Olneyville Boys' Club at age 11 and won various events in the New England Junior and Senior Swimming Championships, ranging from 100 yards to 3.5 miles. She qualified for the 1940 Summer Olympics, which were cancelled due to WWII.

In 1937, Weir won the 500-yard freestyle National Championship in Chicago.

Weir is included in both the Boston University and Rhode Island Heritage Hall of Fame and was involved in the McDermott Indoor Pool project in Warwick, Rhode Island.
