= Doris Kohardt =

East German swimmer

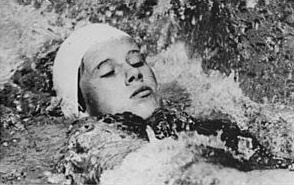
- Doris Kohardt in 1968

Personal information
- Born: 12 November 1950 (age 75) Rostock, Germany
- Height: 1.68 m (5 ft 6 in)
- Weight: 57 kg (126 lb)

Sport
- Sport: Swimming
- Club: SC Empor Rostock

Doris Kohardt (born 12 November 1950) is a retired East German swimmer. She competed at the 1968 Summer Olympics in the 200 m backstroke event, but failed to reach the final. Between 1967 and 1969 she won three national titles in the 100 m and 200 m backstroke.
