= Doris Veillette =

Canadian journalist (1935–2019)

Doris Veillette-Hamel
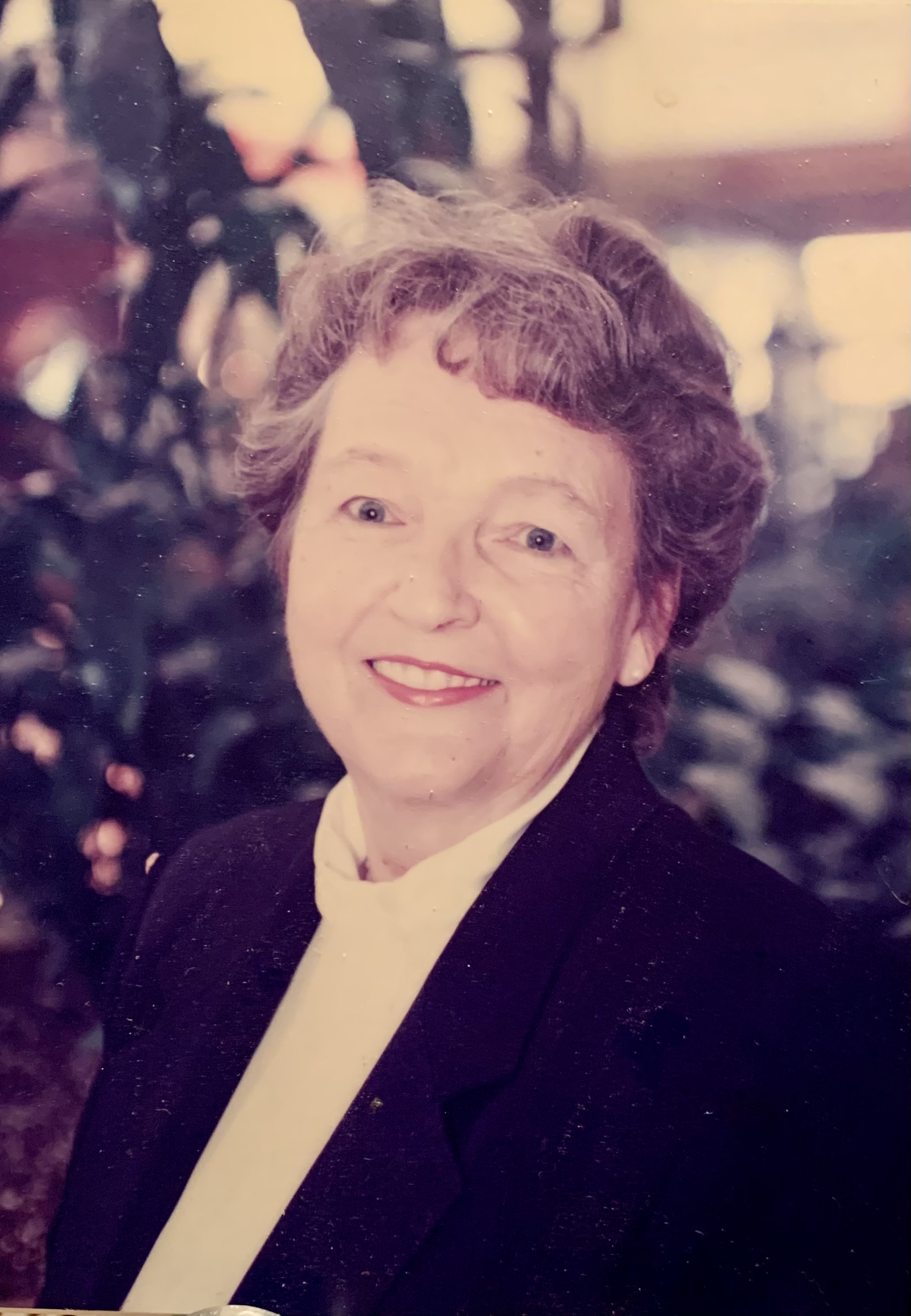
- Occupation: journalist

Doris Veillette (July 6, 1935 in Louiseville, Quebec, Canada – January 4, 2019, in Trois-Rivières) was a Quebec journalist, columnist and feminist. She was married on September 3, 1955 in Saint-Pierre Church of Shawinigan to Marc Hamel.

== Biography ==
Doris Veillette practiced as a journalist from September 1968 to January 1995 in the daily newspaper Le Nouvelliste, published in Trois-Rivières.

From September 1939, Doris Veillette studied at the "École des religieuses Les Filles de Jésus", in Cap-de-la-Madeleine. In 1941, she became a boarder with the Dames Ursulines in Shawinigan, where she graduated in 1953 from a commercial course in English. She completed a bachelor's degree in philosophy and Canadian letters at the University of Quebec at Trois-Rivières (UQTR).

She began her career in April 1953 with Canadian Industries Limited, while completing her studies. Then, she entered the service of Dupont Canada, until the birth of the two twins. On maternity leave, she devoted herself to teaching English. Then, she practiced as secretary of a land surveyor office, and subsequently as secretary-accountant of the Ritha art gallery in Consigny-Gingras, then at Trustees of The Dissentient School in Grand-Mère.

This journalist mainly used two pen names: Doris V. Hamel; Doris Veillette-Hamel, the name Hamel is associated with her husband Marc Hamel. According to research at the BAnQ (Banque et Archives nationales du Québec), Doris V. Hamel appears 3682 times and 111 times under Doris Veillette-Hamel.

She died January 4, 2019. (Note: The historian Gaétan Veillette says about her: "Doris Veillette marked the collective thought of her time with her thousands of writings on various subjects such as the arts and family affairs, with a special touch on the typical subjects, in particular: work-family conciliation, the emancipation of women, their involvement in the public sphere, their affirmation in business, their career successes, their financial independence, their artistic works, the domestic arts, business affairs, cooking, parent-child relationships, clothes... "In Le Nouvelliste, she signed her articles / chronicles under "Doris Hamel" until September 1981; then generally under Doris V.-Hamel until 1992; then, Doris Veillette-Hamel. Her pen name reflects the societal transition from the era when a woman adopted de facto the family name of her husband, and then a hybrid surname, until the era of the use of her own birth name." "As a free thinker, in a simple and direct style, she philosophically reflected the contemporary concerns and aspirations of women in the Mauricie region. It made women think about their reality, their savoir-être, their role as "domestic engineer" and their search for the ideal of the "modern woman".)

== Implications communautaires ==
Doris Veillette was notably a founding member of the first cultural center of Grand-Mère; member of l'Éveil Féminin where she becomes director (she created and edited the journal of the organization); President of the Association of Families of America (1988-89); honorary president of the international women's day of the CLSC des Chenaux in February 1992; member of the Le Nouvelliste Retirees Association (ARALN).

Doris Veillette was the author of the pageant theatrical play of August 14, 1988, during the Tricentennial Festivities of Veillet/te of America in Sainte-Geneviève-de-Batiscan. After her career as a journalist, as a member of the Association of Retirees of Le Nouvelliste (ARALN), she wrote a historical research published on October 27, 1995 in the book "L'histoire trifluvienne et régionale” (The trifluvian and regional history) recounting the stages 75 years of regional life of the daily newspaper Le Nouvelliste. She was chair of the 75th anniversary commemorative book committee.
