= Doris Baaten =

Dutch voice actress

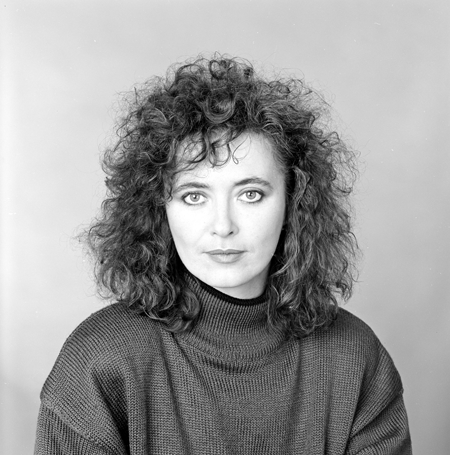
Doris Baaten in 1987

Doris Baaten (born April 12, 1956 in Maastricht, Limburg) is a Dutch voice actress.

Baaten performed various female voices on Sesamstraat, the Dutch co-production of Sesame Street. She also provided the voice for female roles, such as Countess Dahling Von Dahling and Deena, and was featured in musical numbers during the 1980s. She also performed in a Dutch version of the musical Chicago.
