= Doris Gunnarsson =

Swedish politician

Doris Gunnarsson (born 1945) is a Swedish journalist and politician. She is a member of the Centre Party.
