= Doris Martha Weber =

Doris Martha Weber (1898 Fort Atkinson, Wisconsin – 1984, Hinckley, Ohio) was an American photographer.

Weber graduated from the Cleveland School of Art in 1922.

Her work is included in the collections of the Seattle Art Museum and the Akron Art Museum.
