= Doris Gertrude Sheppard =

New Zealand pianist, singer, composer and teacher

Doris Gertrude Sheppard (February 7, 1902 –September 12, 1982) was an English pianist, singer, composer, and teacher who spent much of her life in New Zealand.

== Biography ==
=== Early life and education ===
Doris Sheppard was born in Bromley, Kent, England in 1902 to Georgina Baker and Charles Valentine Sheppard. The family later moved to London. She studied music at the Royal Academy of Music in London beginning in 1920. Her primary teacher was pianist Harold Craxton, although she also took voice lessons. While in school, she won prizes in both voice and piano, and in 1925 won the Dove prize for ‘for general excellence, assiduity, and industry.’

=== Early career ===
Little is known of Sheppards activities after her marriage to Thomas Arthur Duckworth in 1929, although she did work in India with violinist Robert Pikler in the 1930s. After her divorce from Duckworth, she took a post at the Royal Academy of Music teaching young students on Saturdays. On September 1, he remarried, this time to a baritone from New Zealand, Thomas Anthony Larsen. The couple moved to Wellington, New Zealand in January 1949.

=== Mature career ===
Sheppard was active in New Zealand's musical scene almost as soon as she arrived, working as both a soloist and accompanist. A 1950 article in the Wanganui Chronicle entitled "Enjoyable Concert by Wanganui Ladies' Choir Last Night" reviewed Sheppard's piano playing, "Doris Sheppard pleased the audience with her playing of Sonata Op. 13 C Minor (Pathetique) by Beethoven. She is a highly competent and artistic pianist." She was soon heard on the radio through her employment with the New Zealand Broadcasting Service, and also worked as a vocal coach for the New Zealand Opera Company.

As a composer, she primarily wrote music for voice and piano, although she also wrote for larger ensembles such as chorus and orchestra. Her overture The Puff was performed by the National Orchestra of New Zealand, as was her City Square overture in 1958 and again in 1959. Sheppard was still appearing in the news into the 1960s, including an Evening Post article from 1961 describing a vocal recital given by mezzo-soprano Honor McKellar. This review was also positive: "Doris Sheppard's efficient and discerning accompanying was the completion of this especial musical enjoyment. It is to be hoped that it will not be too long before Honor McKellar and Doris Sheppard give us another recital."

Her papers are held at the National Library of New Zealand.

== Selected works ==
=== Solo and chamber music ===
- A Delicate sweet music for voice and piano, text by Vivian Locke Ellis
- And thus they wandered forth for voice and piano, text by Byron
- If I might build another world for thee, Op. 2 for voice and piano, text by Vivian Locke Ellis
- It was a lover and his lass for voice and piano, Op. 5
- Love's Last Gift, Op. 3 for voice and piano
- The Avon, a ballad for medium voice and piano, text by Henry Jacobs
- The Inner Vision for voice and piano
- The Living Theme, song cycle for tenor voice and piano, text by Dora Hagemeyer, ca. 1965
- The Wind for voice and piano
- Vain Questioning, song cycle for voice and piano, text by Walter de la Mare, 1956
- Fugue for solo piano
- Theme and Variations for solo piano
- Romanza for solo piano, 1952
- Symphonic poem for solo piano
- Two Pieces for piano
- Where the world begins for solo baritone voice
- Three part invention for voice, viola, and cello, text by James Kirkup

=== Orchestral works ===
- City Square Overture
- Fantasia
- The Puff Overture
- You have a lot to lose a song cycle for tenor and orchestra, text by C K Stead (III)

=== Choral works ===
- Peace, an anthem for SATB, text by A Drummond

=== Film music ===
- The Long Green Mantle, 1964
