= Doris Kirkman =

American gymnast

Personal information
- Nationality: American
- Born: July 15, 1930 Elizabeth, New Jersey, United States
- Died: June 16, 2010 (aged 79) Gap, Pennsylvania, United States

Sport
- Sport: Gymnastics

Doris Kirkman (July 15, 1930 – June 16, 2010) was an American gymnast. She competed in seven events at the 1952 Summer Olympics.
