= Doris Troth Lippman =

Professor of Nursing at the Fairfield University School of Nursing

Doris Troth Lippman is a professor of nursing at the Fairfield University School of Nursing located in Fairfield, CT. She also practices as an Advanced Practice Registered Nurse at Fairfield Community Services in Fairfield, CT.

Lippman served as a captain in the United States Army Nursing Corps during 1967–1968 working at a Mobile Army Surgical Hospital (M.A.S.H.) during the Vietnam War. She was Vice Chairman of the Vietnam Women's Memorial Project where she was actively involved in gaining approval for its funding and unveiling on the National Mall in Washington, D.C. For her efforts, Lippman was awarded an honorary Military Order of the Purple Heart in 2003.

She was President of the Connecticut Nurses' Association, which awarded Lippman their highest honor, the Diamond Jubilarian Agnes Ohlson Award, for her contributions to nursing through political action. And in 2005, she was inducted as a Fellow of the American Academy of Nursing.

Lippman received her Bachelor of Science degree in nursing from Cornell University, a Master of Arts from Fairfield University, and a masters and doctorate degree in education from Columbia University. She and her husband, Dr. Kenneth Lippman, reside in Westport, Connecticut.
