= Dee Doris =

- Born: Delta State, Nigeria
- Genres: Gospel, contemporary gospel, worship
- Occupations: Singer, songwriter
- Instrument: Vocals
- Years active: 1993–present
- Labels: LMAM, DeeDoris Music Limited
- Website: https://deedorismusic.com

Dee Doris is a Nigerian gospel musician, singer and songwriter. She hails from Delta State, Nigeria and is an ordained deaconess in Christ Embassy.

== Life and career ==
Dee Doris also known as Doris Nnadi is popularly known for her songs; "Omemma", "No be counterfeit" and "In This Place". Dee Doris first album I look to you, was released in 2016 under the Loveworld Music and Arts Ministry (LMAM). She embarked on several radio tours, concerts and ministrations in 2018. One of her singles "Omemma" released in 2020 has over 73000 views on YouTube.

== Discography ==
=== Albums ===
- I Look To You (2016)
- Supernatural (2018)

=== Singles ===
- "Faithful God" (2016)
- "In His Presence" (2016)
- "Supernatural" (2017)
- "In This Place" (2018)
- "No Bi Counterfeit" (2019)
- "Omemma" (2020)
- "Chimonye Obioma" (2020)
