= Andrew F. Hilyer =

American lawyer

Andrew Franklin Hilyer
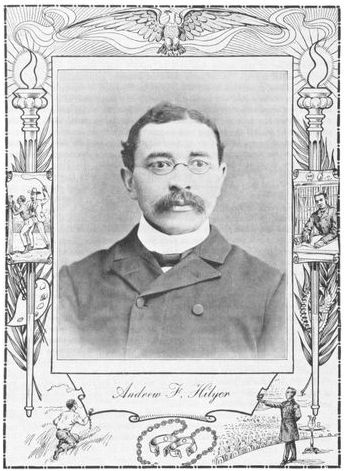

Personal details
- Born: August 14, 1858 Georgia
- Died: January 13, 1925 Washington D.C.
- Spouse(s): Mamie Elizabeth Nichols (m. 1886; died 1916) Amanda Victoria Gray (m. 1923)
- Profession: Businessman, lawyer, inventor, activist and real estate investor

Andrew Franklin Hilyer (August 14, 1858 – January 13, 1925) was an accomplished Washington, D.C., lawyer, businessman, real estate investor, activist and inventor. He was born on August 14, 1858, in Georgia, and died in January 1925. An avid believer in the potential and development of African Americans, he devoted his life to cultivating black business in D.C. His interests spanned a variety of activities, and although a lawyer by profession, he dabbled in many areas throughout his time in the capitol.

== Early life and education ==
Andrew Hilyer was born enslaved in Georgia in the Summer of 1858. When he was still a child, he and his mother became Exodusters, a group of thousands of southern blacks who moved to High Plains states in search of a better life. They fled to Nebraska and he relocated again after the death of his mother, this time to Minneapolis, Minnesota, as a freeman. There, he met and befriended several wealthy white families such as the Gale and Pillsbury families. These families helped him in his education, especially in pursuing higher education. He graduated from the Minneapolis High School in 1878. Then, he enrolled in the University of Minnesota, and was the first African American to graduate from there with a B.A. in 1882. In order to further his education and to fuel his interest in law, Hilyer moved to Washington, D.C., where he attended Howard University, graduating with an LL.B (1884) and an LL.M (1885).

== Personal life ==
In 1886, he married Mamie Elizabeth Nichols (1863–1916), with whom he had three children: Gale, Franklin and Kathleen. Mamie Elizabeth was a D.C. native whose family had been free for several generations. She was a music enthusiast and a member of the well-known Booklovers Clubs. Seven years after his first wife died in 1916, he married Amanda Victoria Gray (1870–1957). She was a graduate of the Howard School of Pharmacy, the widow of Arthur Gray, who was involved with the Hilyer family in Washington's civic affairs.

== Professional life ==
Hilyer's first job was as a correspondent for the Northwest Review while he was at Howard University. After his graduation, he took a job as a class II clerk at the Treasury Department and he later on became Secretary Treasurer. Hilyer's most notable impact and significance lie in his innovative organizational activities aimed at developing the black community in Washington, economically, politically, culturally and educationally. At a time when there was a very strong debate within the black community between the advantages of industrial versus liberal, political versus economic development, and the strategies of internal black development versus attempts for equality and assimilation into the mainstream of American life, Hilyer did not see the need to restrict the options for black development. His passion lay in organising opportunities for the betterment of Washington, D.C.’s black business population, and he often worked with white citizens, convincing them to help develop the black economic community through employment and business education. Hilyer was one of the founders and the first president of the Union League of the District of Columbia which was organized in 1892 "to advance the moral, material and financial interests of the colored people". The Union League published directories of black businesspeople in 1892, 1894, and 1895 and in 1901 published A historical, Biographical and Statistical Study of Colored Washington which was directed and a coordinated by Hilyer. The document recorded 1000 black-owned business by 1901, an impressive leap from the 120 recorded in 1894. His business interests also led him to attend the Paris Exposition of 1900, representing the U.S. Commission, where he organised the “Collective Exhibit of Negroes in Merchandise, Factories and Allied Occupations.”

Because he was a civil servant Hilyer was not able to participate in politics overtly. He was, however, the founder of the Correspondence Club which was designed to influence public opinion, media representation and public policy as they affected the black community. The membership of this club was limited to only twelve people and its existence was never publicized. In essence, the Correspondence Club was a secret lobbying organization for the black race. As a member of the National Association for the Advancement of Colored People (NAACP), Hilyer also lent his efforts to the struggle against racial injustices. He showed his support for other empowerment initiatives, and was present at the first meeting of Booker T. Washington’s National Negro Business League in 1900. He held a position on the Board of Trustees at Howard University and he advocated for liberal and professional education. He was also a supporter of industrial education, participated in Hampton institute conferences, and sent one of his sons, Franklin, to Armstrong, the industrial high school in Washington, D.C. He was also the chairman of the Committee of Business and Labor in D.C.

== Other interests ==
Alongside his federal employment, Hilyer also dabbled in real estate investment – buying, developing and selling properties. He was also an acclaimed inventor, receiving patents in 1900 for his inventions of a hot-air register and a water evaporator for a hot-air register. He enjoyed literature and the arts, and was a member of the Bethel Literary and Historical Association as well as the Muso-Lit Club. The establishment of the S. Coleridge-Taylor Choral Society was as a result of Hilyer and his first wife. Mamie Elizabeth had a passion for music and through her dedication the pair even managed to organise concerts on two separate occasions at which the Samuel Coleridge-Taylor himself performed.

== Death ==
Hilyer died at his home on January 13, 1925. Funeral services were held on Jan. 16 in Rankin Memorial Chapel, Howard University, and he was buried in Harmony Cemetery, Washington, D.C. His home is still part of the Howard University campus today and is used for administrative offices.
