= Doris E. Fales =

American embryologist

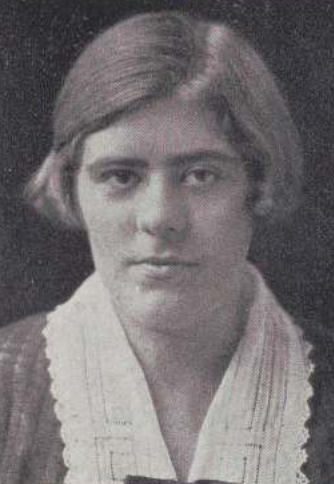
- Doris E. Fales, from the 1925 yearbook of Mount Holyoke College
- Born: Doris Edna Fales; October 23, 1902; Worcester, Massachusetts, U.S.
- Died: December 30, 1992 (age 90); Newton, Massachusetts, U.S.
- Occupations: Embryologist, college professor

Doris Edna Fales (October 23, 1902 – December 30, 1992) was an American embryologist and college professor. She was first chair of the chemistry and biology department at Richmond Professional Institute, the School of Applied Sciences, from 1943 to 1952.

== Early life and education ==
Fales was born in Worcester, Massachusetts, the daughter of Almon Lawrence Fales and Edna Mabel Norton Fales. Her father was a civil engineer. Her mother died in 1908, and her father remarried. Fales graduated from Mount Holyoke College in 1925, earned a master's degree at Western Reserve University in 1927, and completed doctoral studies in zoology at Yale University in 1931.

== Career ==
Fales was a professor at the Richmond Professional Institute from 1932 to 1952, and from 1943 to 1953 she was the first chair of the institute's School of Applied Sciences.

In 1940, Fales and her partner Anna Kosslow were active with the Richmond chapters of the China Aid Council and the American League for Peace and Democracy, in protesting aid to Japan. In retirement, she and Kosslow lived in Maine, making, exhibiting, and selling driftwood sculptures and lamps.

== Publications ==
- "The Light Receptive Organs of Certain Barnacles" (1928)
- "Experiments on the development of the pronephros of Amblystoma punctatum" (1935)
- "Differential growth of setae in a megascolescid earthworm, Chilota purcelli" (1937)
- "A study of double hearts produced experimentally in embryos of Amblystoma punctatum" (1946)

== Personal life ==
Fales met her partner, social worker Anna L. Kosslow, in 1932. They lived together in Richmond, and bought a house together in Belfast, Maine, in 1952. By 1954, they were living full time in Maine. Fales died in 1992, at the age of 90.
