= Doris June Struble =

American pianist (1895–1976)

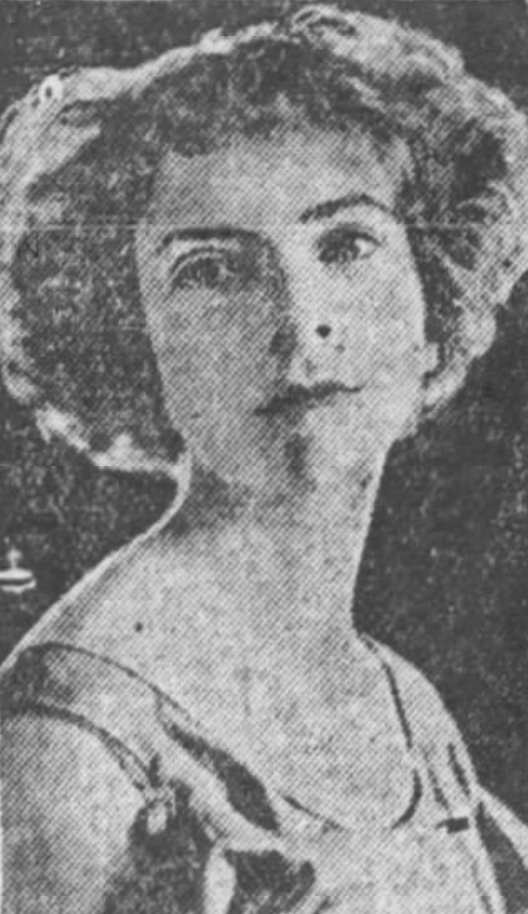
- Doris June Struble, from a 1922 publication
- Born: June 21, 1895; Sioux City, Iowa
- Died: June 1976 (aged 80–81); Fresno, California
- Other names: Doris Struble Harmon (after first marriage), Doris Seyller (after second marriage)
- Occupations: Singer, pianist, dramatic reader
- Years active: 1910s, 1920s

Doris June Struble (June 21, 1895 – 1976) was an American pianist, singer, and dramatic reader, based in California. As a young woman, she toured North America, Australia, and New Zealand, and performed on radio; in her later years, she wrote poetry and was a popular children's hospital entertainer in Fresno.

== Early life ==
Doris June Struble was born in Sioux City, Iowa, the daughter of Michael A. Struble and Sarah June Pattenden Struble. She studied piano from childhood, and graduated from Sioux City Central High School in 1913. In 1914, she starred in a large church pageant in Sioux City. She trained as a performer at the Columbia College of Dramatic Art in Chicago, and as a singer with Oscar Saenger in New York.

== Career ==
Struble toured as a pianist, singer, and dramatic reader on the Chautauqua circuit in the United States and Canada in the 1910s and 1920s. She appeared in Australia and New Zealand in 1918 and 1919, as a member of the Southern Seas Sextette (an all-woman musical ensemble), as a soloist, and accompanying singer Carrie Lanceley. She performed her own works, and pieces by Edna Ferber, Mana-Zucca, Edgar Guest, Carrie Jacobs-Bond, Charles Wakefield Cadman, and other writers. She was especially active in California, often seen on women's club programs and at other community events. Her act also worked on radio. She continued performing her dramatic readings for community groups into the 1940s.

In the 1950s and 1960s, Doris Struble Harmon wrote short poems that appeared in newspapers including The Wall Street Journal. In the 1970s, she was known as the "Fairy Godmother" of Valley Children's Hospital, because she would dress up in a silver cloak, a tiara, and carry a magic wand to visit the young patients to tell them stories.

== Personal life ==
Doris June Struble married Sturges Harmon of Chicago in 1923. They had two children, James and Sarah. She was widowed in 1973, and married again in 1974, to Kennard Burdette Seyller Sr. She died in 1976, aged 81 years, in Fresno, California.
