= Doris Stuart Kngwarreye =

Doris Stuart Kngwarreye (born c. 1940) is the senior traditional owner for Mparntwe (Alice Springs) in the Northern Territory of Australia.

== Early life ==
Doris Stuart Kngwarreye was born at Hamilton Downs Station in the early 1940s. Her family has lived alongside the Todd River (Llhere Mparntwe) for countless generations. It was her father's traditional ground.

She is the Apmereke artweye (traditional owner) and speaks Central Arrernte. Her main Dreamings are Kngwelye (dog) associated with Mount Gillen (Alhekulyele) and Yeperenye, Ntyarlke, and Utnerrengatye (caterpillar species).

== Advocacy ==
Stuart is an advocate for the protection of Aboriginal sacred sites and cultural knowledge in the area. She was a key spokeswoman in the Alice Springs native title claim in the 1990s.

She was one of a group of Mparntwe traditional custodians who lobbied to get the Mount Gillen / Alhekulyele climbing track closed. The site is an essential element of the Ayeye Akngwelye Mpartnwe-arenyethe — Dog Story of Alice Springs. It was officially registered as a sacred site in December 2020, and completely closed in March 2021.

She has run sacred site tours around Mparntwe, working with local artists to deepen community understanding of her country.
