= Doris Wagner (scientist) =

American biologist

- Education: University of California, Berkeley; Technical University of Munich
- Scientific career
- Workplaces: University of Pennsylvania
- Thesis: Functional and structural analysis of Phytochrome B : a novel photoreceptor (1996)
- Website: Wagner Lab

Doris Wagner is an American biologist who is the Robert I. Williams Term Professor of Biology at the University of Pennsylvania. Her research looks to better understand the structure-function relationships of plant cells. She established the Epigenomics of Plants International Consortium. Wagner is a Fellow of the American Society of Plant Biologists.

== Early life and education ==
Wagner was an undergraduate student at the Technical University of Munich. She started a graduate degree at the University of California, Berkeley, where she studied structure-function properties of phytochrome B. After earning her doctorate, Wagner joined California Institute of Technology as a Helen Hay Whitney Foundation research fellow.

== Research and career ==
Wagner is interested in how the genomes within chromatin are altered in response to environmental signals. She has focused on ATP-dependent chromatin remodeling and shown that chromatin remodelling regulates many distinct processes. In 2010, she founded the Epigenomics of Plants International Consortium (EPIC).

Wagner also investigates the fundamental mechanisms that underpin reproductive development of Arabidopsis thaliana. This includes how the helix-turn-helix transcription factor LEAFY (LFY) direct the formation of primordium and onset of reproduction. To investigate LFY, Wagner uses global expression and binding studies. Wagner believes that LFY gets hold of particular parts of the chromatin bundle, loosens the structure and recruits new proteins. This eventually permits genes to be transcribed into RNA.

In 2019, Wagner was made Fellow of the American Society of Plant Biologists. She is the editor-in-chief of the journal Current Opinion in Plant Biology.

== Selected publications ==
- Peter H. Quail; Margaret T. Boylan; Brian M. Parks; Timothy W. Short; Yong Xu; Wagner, Doris (1995). "Phytochromes: photosensory perception and signal transduction". Science. 268 (5211): 675–680. Bibcode:1995Sci...268..675Q. doi:10.1126/science.7732376. PMID 7732376. Wikidata Q40514710.
- Wagner, Doris; Robert W. M. Sablowski; Meyerowitz, Elliot (1999). "Transcriptional activation of APETALA1 by LEAFY". Science. 285 (5427): 582–584. doi:10.1126/science.285.5427.582. PMID 10417387. Wikidata Q33333886.
- Ayako Yamaguchi; Miin-Feng Wu; Li Yang; Gang Wu; R Scott Poethig; Wagner, Doris (2009). "The microRNA-regulated SBP-Box transcription factor SPL3 is a direct upstream activator of LEAFY, FRUITFULL, and APETALA1". Developmental Cell. 17 (2): 268–278. doi:10.1016/j.devcel.2009.06.007. PMC 2908246. PMID 19686687. Wikidata Q33347619.
