= Doris Gnauck White =

Doris Gnauck White (24 December 1926 – 19 November 2001) was a science educator and a researcher of the biochemical and biophysical foundations of agriculture. She won fame for her skill in curing sick chickens.

== Life ==
Gnauck was born in Milwaukee. Her parents had immigrated from Germany. The father, Paul Benjamin Gnauck, was an aviation pioneer and the mother, Johanna born Syring was a teacher. Gnauck grew up on a farm in Granville and graduated from Shorewood High School.

In 1944, Gnauck won a University of Wisconsin scholarship. From her early years she cared for chickens. In 1946 she published the cartoon Chick Doctor. Working on the university's poultry experimental farm, she came in touch with questions of genetics, vitamine deficiencies and hormones. In 1947, she was the only girl who graduated with honors from the agricultural school of the University of Wisconsin. By her graduation, she was qualified to teach vocational agriculture, but she was not admitted to do so, supposedly because she was a woman. In the same year the family's house burned down and her parents became ill. Gnauck had to contribute to the family's living. She raised a garden and cared for baby chicks.

Gnauck taught at a U.S. Army Military Prison and natural sciences at high schools in Wisconsin. For the United States Department of Agriculture she investigated genetic resistance of wheat. Gnauck wrote her first Ph.D. on horticulture, but then she turned to entomology.

In 1954, Gnauck married Donald Lawrence White. She received her doctoral degree from the University of Wisconsin in 1956. She and her husband moved to Hunterdon County, New Jersey. In 1960, she was appointed assistant professor for mathematics and science at the William Paterson University. She investigated AIDS transmission by insects and worked for the American Environmental Laboratory.

She was an active member of the Methodist Church. In 2001, she died in Annandale, New Jersey, aged 74.

=== Works ===
- Chick Doctor, cartoon, 1946
- Self fecundation of Cucurbita maxima, 1949
- A comparison of three techniques involving the use of visual education procedures in the development of entomological vocabulary in secondary school science. Dissertation University of Wisconsin 1956

=== Honors ===
Since 1985, she was a New Jersey Science Teachers Association Fellow, and in 2001 she got the citation scroll by this organization, which is awarded for outstanding contributions to science and/or science education.

The New Jersey Science Teachers Association offers the Doris White Memorial Scholarship to students who are enrolled in a Teacher Education Program at a New Jersey institution of higher education.
