= Dorsha Hayes =

American novelist

Dorsha Hayes (January 2, 1897 – November 27, 1990), born Doris Bentley, was a stage actress and dancer during the early 20th century. She was born in Galesburg, Illinois. She made her debut appearance in Pierre Loti's Daughter of Heaven in 1912. She continued to perform until suffering a case of rheumatic fever in 1936, and thereafter became a published writer. Her works include the novels Mrs. Heaton's Daughter and Who Walk with the Earth?, and the non-fiction works An American Primer and Chicago, Crossroads of American Enterprise. She died in Manhattan of complications after a stroke, at age 93 years. Anthony Hatch, in his book "Tinder Box," mentions Dorsha Hayes as a young girl visiting Chicago with her family from Galesburg. Among other things, the family was to see "Bluebeard" at the Iroquois Theater, until her mother had a premonition and they skipped the performance. The theater burned down during that performance, killing 605 people. He did not mention the actress in his book, but it is understandable she might have taken her stage name from a local girl who escaped a theater disaster.
