= Belgrave St Ives =

Coordinates: 50.21343°N 5.48057°W

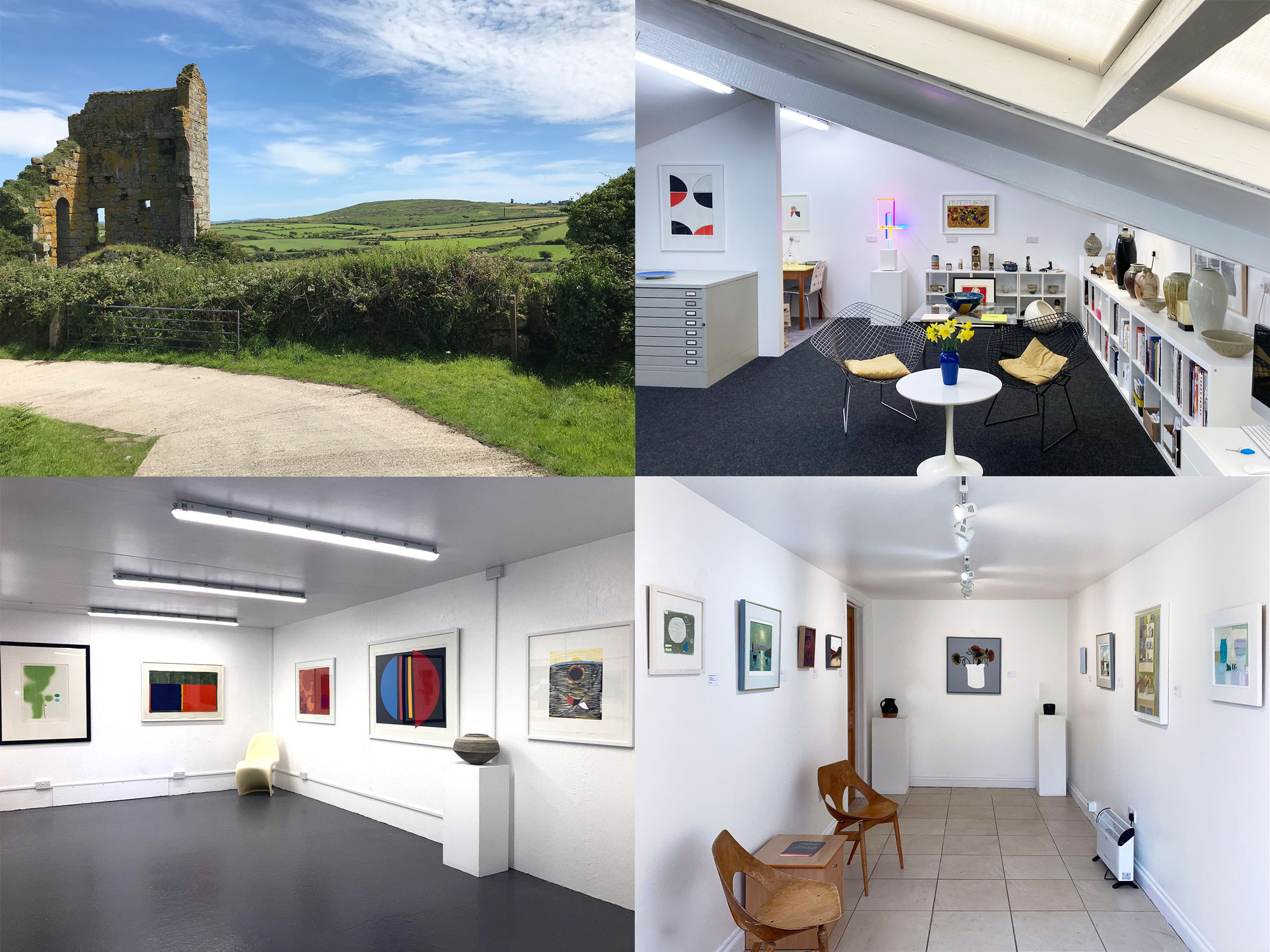
A montage representing the new location and exhibition spaces of Belgrave St Ives

Belgrave St Ives is a commercial art gallery, specialising in modern British and contemporary art in St Ives, Cornwall, southwest England. It gives emphasis to work produced in Cornwall from the 1930s onwards, when the town of St Ives became an internationally important modernist artistic centre.

== History ==
The original gallery opened in 1974 in Motcomb Street, Belgravia, London. It moved to various London locations, including Mayfair, St James's, and Belsize Park until a St Ives sister gallery opened in 1998. In 2010 the St Ives gallery became independent and continues as the sole remaining part of the Belgrave Gallery enterprise. It maintains a programme of exhibitions of work by major artists associated with the St Ives Modern Period, such as Wilhelmina Barns-Graham and Terry Frost, as well as representing those formerly overshadowed in conventional accounts of Modern British art recently gaining greater prominence such as Sven Berlin. Works by other Modern British and contemporary artists are also shown. An annual fixture is the St Ives Exhibition, usually in the early summer, which focuses on Modernist art produced by those associated with the town. In September 2020, after 22 years in St Ives, Belgrave St Ives relocated to a rural location in Towednack, just a couple of miles from St Ives.

== Publications ==
The gallery has published books on the artists Terry Frost, John Milne and Patrick Hayman, as well as to accompany exhibitions of work from Sven Berlin, Terry Frost, and artists at the Camberwell College of Arts.

== Notable exhibitions ==
=== Motcomb Street, Belgravia ===
- 15 March – 16 April 1978 Jewish Artists of Great Britain 1845–1945

=== Masons Yard, St James's ===
- 21 February – 29 March 1985 British Post-Impressionists and Moderns
- 10 May – 3 June 1988 Camberwell Artists of the ‘40s and ‘50s
- 12 October – 3 November 1989 Terry Frost
- 23 November – 15 December 1989 Sven Berlin- Paintings, Drawings and Sculpture
- 15 March – 6 April 1990 Some of the Moderns
- 14 June – 13 July 1990 Jack Pender
- 17 October – 9 November 1990 Michael Canney- Paintings, Constructions and Reliefs
- 11–21 December 1990 Jacob Kramer 1892–1962
- 6–28 March 1991 Willi Soukop RA
- 5–27 March 1992 British Abstract Art of the ‘50s and ‘60s
- 17 June – 10 July 1992 Stephen Gilbert- Sculpture of the ‘60s and Works on Paper

=== England's Lane, Belsize Park ===
- 15 March – 5 April 2001 Conroy Maddox- A Surrealist Odyssey

=== St Ives ===
- 7–30 November 2015 40 Years of Painting- Camberwell Students and Teachers 1945–1985
- 10 September – 3 October 2016 Wilhelmina Barns-Graham- St Andrews and St Ives
- 19 June – 15 July 2017 Terry Frost- A Book of Ideas

== Artists ==
Modern British and St Ives	Contemporary
Wilhelmina Barns-Graham	Virginia Bounds
Anthony Benjamin	Bob Bourne
Sven Berlin	John Emanuel
Sandra Blow	Anthony Frost
Michael Canney	Luke Frost
Tom Cross	Ffiona Lewis
Bob Crossley	Jason Lilley
Terry Frost	Padraig Macmiadhachain
Patrick Hayman	Felicity Mara
Patrick Heron	Christopher Marvell
Roger Hilton	Alice Mumford
Peter Lanyon	Brian Rice
Ben Nicholson
Kate Nicholson
Victor Pasmore
William Scott
Michael Snow
Alfred Wallace
John Wells
Bryan Wynter
