= Jocelyn Brown (landscape architect) =

Australian writer, artist

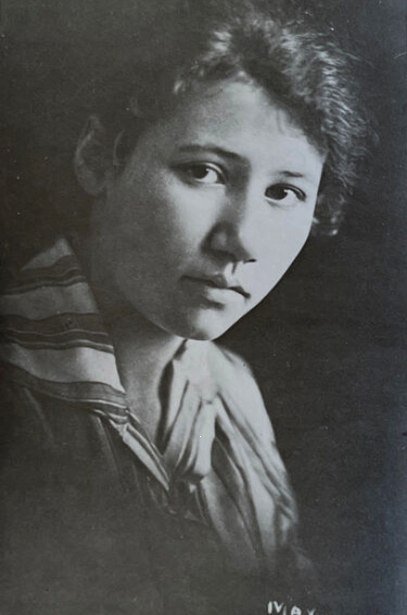
- by Max Moore
- Born: Doris Jocelyn Giles; 13 August 1898; Toowong
- Died: 3 October 1971 (aged 73); Camden
- Education: classes at Royal Art Society of New South Wales
- Occupation: garden designer
- Spouse: Alfred John Brown
- Children: two sons

(Doris) Jocelyn Brown born Doris Jocelyn Giles (1898 – 1971) was an Australian writer, landscape gardener and artist.

== Life ==
Brown was born in 1898 in the Brisbane suburb of Toowong. Her mother, Georginia Munro Hull, was an Australian and her father, Sydney Reynolds Giles, had been born in England. She was engaged in 1915 to Alfred John Brown who was from New Zealand, but he was then training in Sydney. In 1920 she married her fiancé who was then employed as an assistant architect in England. They stayed in England during the 1920s and they were both inspired by the new town of Welwyn Garden City.

In 1930 they were back in Australia where her husband took an interest in town planning. In 1933, she and Alfred had a joint exhibition of their paintings in George Street in Sydney. She was described as "Mrs A.J.Brown" in the Sydney Morning Herald where the writer noted their similar styles - although Jocelyn was less meticulous and more colourful. She was working as a commercial artist, but she was a serial garden designer and throughout the 1930s and during the war years she built a number of gardens for herself in different suburbs of Sydney.

== Writer ==
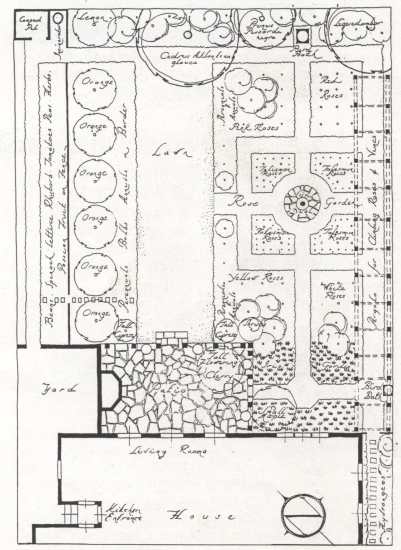
Her design of March 1942 from The Home magazine

In 1939 she began to write about garden design for the quarterly design magazine, The Home. She would illustrate her articles with plans and sketches. She was a regular contributor until the magazine ceased publication in 1942. Her designs were for suburban residences where neo-Tudor was the fashion. She was a fan of arts and crafts follower Gertrude Jekyll, who saw the garden and the house as complementary designs. Brown's designs would feature rockeries, mixed borders and vistas away from the house with silver foliage and classis Edwardian flowering plants near the home. She was not a fan of native species although they were included if not featured.

Her Sydney gardens at Killara and her writing brought in commissions including St. Aubin's House at Scone in 1940. She also lectured at the University of Sydney about landscape design. Brown died in Camden in 1971. Her husband survived her by five years and he had an unsuccessful second marriage.

In 1978 The Gardens of Jocelyn Brown was published. Helen Proudfoot wrote her biography, Gardens in Bloom: Jocelyn Brown and Her Sydney Gardens of the '30s and '40s, and this was published in 1989.
