= Doris Crump Bradshaw =

American librarian and genealogist

Doris Crump Bradshaw (1896-1994) worked as a librarian and part-time cataloger at the Columbia Public Library from 1942 to 1946. Most of her time, however, was spent working in the community and in organizations throughout the state of Missouri. Of the numerous organizations that she was involved in, she was most active in the American Association of University Women. In 1945–1949, she was the State Legislative Chairman for Missouri. She was also the State Social Studies Chairman for one year, from 1950 to 1951. Bradshaw was also active in the League of Women Voters, other women's associations, including the Daughters of the American Colonists and the University of Missouri Fortnightly Club, and library organizations such as the Columbia Public Library board and the Missouri Library Association.

== Education ==
Bradshaw studied at the Los Angeles Library School and graduated from the University of Missouri with a bachelor's degree in journalism in 1925.

== Publications ==
Bradshaw compiled a number of records related to the history of Missouri on behalf of the Daughters of the American Revolution.

- Marriages-Boone County, Missouri, 1877
- Marriage records of Boone County, Missouri, 1873 / compiled by Columbian Chapter, Daughters of the American Revolution, Columbia, Missouri
- Anna Glenday Durfee : log cabin school teacher, St. Charles, Missouri
- State Historical Library catalog as it pertains to Saline County : list made 1959-1960

== Personal life ==
Bradshaw married William L. Bradshaw, later dean of the School of Business and Public Administration at the University of Missouri, in 1926. Their son, William L. Bradshaw, Jr., was born in 1935.
