= Doris Gentile =

Australian writer

- Gentile in 1923
- Born: Doris May Dinham; 30 October 1894; Woolwich, New South Wales
- Died: 16 May 1972 (aged 77); Little Bay, New South Wales, Australia
- Writing career
- Pen name: D. Manners-Sutton

Doris May Gentile (née Dinham; 30 October 1894 – 16 May 1972) was an Australian novelist and short story writer, who travelled and wrote in Africa, Europe and Canada from 1925 until the Second World War.

== Early life ==
She was born Doris May Dinham in the Sydney suburb of Woolwich—her parents were English engraver Harry Charles Dinham and his Tasmanian-born wife Ida Margaret Pybus.

== Writing career ==
Dinham began writing at the age of 7, with a story published in The Australasian. Subsequently writing for that publications including The Sydney Mail and the Sunraysia Daily, she published her novel, A Marked Soul, in 1923.

In June 1925, Dinham departed Australia seeking "high adventure" and made her way to Africa, where she worked in South Africa for a tobacco company, and continued publishing her writing in local newspapers. In 1926, she trekked from Cape Town to the Belgian Congo, a journey which made headlines in Australia. She remarked to journalists in London: "Novelists must revise their conception of 'Darkest Africa' as a realm of adventure."—elaborating that cars, schools and hospitals were widespread on the continent. Her time in South Africa, Congo and surrounding areas resulted in two novels: Black God and The Last Secret, both of which featured African settings and characters.

Gentile told stories of her life and some are embellished and others are incorrect. She would give her birth year as 1908 and take on the title of "Contessa". She wrote letters telling of her work during the war fighting with the partisans to bring down Mussolini. What is known is that from 1943 to 1946 she was in Civiglio above Lake Como where she and her children were frequently hungry.

== Honours ==
Gentile Street in the Canberra suburb of Franklin is named after Doris Gentile.
