= Doris Fuchs (scientist) =

German political scientist (born 1966)

Doris Fuchs (born 1966) is a German Political Scientist and Professor of International Relations and Sustainable Development at the University of Münster. She currently serves as Co-Director of the Research Institute for Sustainability (RIFS) in Potsdam, previously known as the Institute for Advanced Sustainability Studies.

Fuchs received her Ph.D. in Political Science & Economics at Claremont Graduate University in California and completed her Habilitation at LMU Munich. She was a lecturer and researcher at the University of Michigan, Louisiana State University, LMU Munich, the HHL Leipzig Graduate School of Management as well as the University of Stuttgart. Since October 2023, Fuchs has held the position of Co-Director at the Research Institute for Sustainability (RIFS) in Potsdam, which is affiliated with the GFZ Helmholtz Centre for Geosciences.

== Research interests ==
Fuchs’ main research interests lie in the areas of sustainable development and international political economy. She specializes in conceptual topics such as power (especially structural and discursive power), sustainable consumption and financialization. Empirically, she focuses on environmental, energy, and agrifood policy, in particular. One of her central research interests is the political influence of non-state, especially economic, actors on ecological and social sustainability, in multi-level governance.

== Selected publications ==
- Fuchs, Doris, Richard Meyer-Eppler, and Ulrich Hamenstädt. 2013. "Food for Thought: The Politics of Financialization in the Global Agrifood System”. Competition & Change 17(3): 219-233.
- Fuchs, Doris, Agni Kalfagianni, Jennifer Clapp, and Lawrence Busch. 2011. "Private Agrifood Governance. Values, Shortcoming and Strategies“. Agriculture and Human Values 28 (3): 335-344.
- Clapp, Jennifer, and Doris Fuchs (Eds.). 2009. Corporate Power in Global Agrifood Governance. Challenges and Strategies. Boston: MIT Press.
- Fuchs, Doris. 2007. Business Power in Global Governance. Boulder: Lynne Rienner Publishers.
- Fuchs, Doris, and Sylvia Lorek. 2005. "Sustainable Consumption Governance. A History of Promises and Failures“. Journal of Consumer Policy 28 (3): 261–288. Reprinted in Dauvergne, Peter (Ed.). 2013. Environmental Politics. Houndmills: Edward Elgar, 652-679.
