= Doris K. Miller =

American psychologist and activist

Doris K. Miller (1922 – March 8, 2015) was the professional name used by Doris Koteen Seldin, an American clinical psychologist and peace activist.

== Life ==
Doris Koteen was born in 1922, the youngest of four children of Jewish emigrants who left Russia in 1905 and settled in Paterson, New Jersey. Originally a social worker for the Veterans Administration, she gained a doctorate in Clinical Psychology from New York University in 1964. She worked as consulting school psychologist at the Walden School in New York before going into private practice.

She was married twice, originally to Norman Miller and then in 1955 to Joel Seldin, a New York Herald Tribune reporter.

A leftist political activist, Miller started with union organizing at the VA. She helped found the Society Against Nuclear Explosions (SANE) later headed by Norman Cousins. She was also a founding member of Psychologists for Social Action, and active in the Women's International League for Peace and Freedom.

Miller died of heart failure on March 8, 2015.
