= Doris Y. Wilkinson =

American sociologist (1936–2024)

Doris Yvonne Wilkinson (June 13, 1936 – June 23, 2024) was an American sociologist from Lexington, Kentucky, who was an instigator of racial integration at the University of Kentucky as the first African American to graduate from the University of Kentucky in 1958 as an undergraduate student. At the University of Kentucky, she was the director for the African American Heritage in the Department of Sociology. And in 1969 Wilkinson was the first African-American woman to become a full-time faculty member at University of Kentucky when she joined the Department of Sociology.

Wilkinson is known for her foundational work in sociology on critical race theory and the sociology of health and illness. She was also the first African American woman to be in a full time faculty position at a college, the University of Kentucky. Due to her work in the field of sociology, Wilkinson was given a room in the University of Kentucky in her name. It is the Doris Y. Wilkinson conference room in Breckinridge hall.

Wilkinson died on June 23, 2024, at the age of 88.

== Early life and education ==
Doris Y. Wilkinson was born in 1936 in Lexington, Kentucky to Howard T. and Regina L. Wilkinson. She attended Paul Lawrence Dunbar High School, while attending she was awarded status of Valedictorian of her graduating class while also being crowned homecoming queen. In the fall of 1954, Wilkinson enrolled at the University of Kentucky, being a part of the first group of African American students to earn an undergraduate degree from University of Kentucky. During her time at University of Kentucky, she created a social club called the Forum for Black Faculty, which is considered to be the first social club for Black Women at the University of Kentucky. She also created the Carter G. Woodson Lecture Series for untenured faculty, the Black Women's Conference, and was a founder and director of Black Studies which she also renamed the African American Studies and Research Program. Wilkinson graduated with her BA in sociology in 1958. Wilkinson earned her master's degree in sociology from Western Reserve University in 1960. In 1968, she earned her doctorate's degree in Medical Sociology from Case Western Reserve University. Prof. Wilkerson also earned her master's degree of Public Health degree from Johns Hopkins University in 1985.

== Desegregation of University of Kentucky ==
Wilkinson enrolled in University of Kentucky in Lexington in 1954 a few months after the United States Supreme Court Brown v. Board of Education ruling. She was in the first group of African-American students to graduate from University of Kentucky as an undergraduate student when she earned her BA in sociology in 1958.

After earning her doctorate in Medical Sociology, in 1969 Wilkinson was the first African-American woman to become a full-time faculty member at University of Kentucky when she joined the Department of Sociology.

== Sociology career ==
Wilkinson was a leader in the field of Sociology including holding positions of President of the Eastern Sociological Society, Vice President of the American Sociological Association, President of the Society for the Study of Social Problems, and President of the District of Columbia Sociological Society.
