= Doris Weatherford =

American author and historian

Doris Weatherford is an American author and historian who writes about women's studies and the history of women in the United States.

== Early life ==
She was born in Minnesota and moved with her family to Arkansas when she was about 10. She graduated from Arkansas Tech where she met her husband Roy Weatherford. While he studied at Harvard she was a graduate fellow at Brandeis University in Boston. They later moved to Tampa, Florida.

== Career ==
Weatherford writes a column for the newspaper La Gaceta.

Weatherford is a former chair of the Florida Women's Hall of Fame.

Florida Governor Lawton Chiles appointed her a trustee of Hillsborough Community College. In 2020 she commemorated Women's Equality Day with Tampa Mayor Jane Castor and U.S. Representative Kathy Castor. She received a lifetime achievement award from the League of Women Voters.

Her husband Roy taught at the University of South Florida for 35 years and died in 2020.

== Bibliography ==
- Foreign and Female: Immigrant Women in America' 1840 - 1930 (1995 revised and expanded edition; originally published in 1986)
- American Women and World War II (1990)
- American Women's History: An A-Z of People, Organizations, Issues and Events
- Milestones: A Chronology of American Women's History, 1492-1995
- A History of the American Suffragist Movement
- The Women's Almanac
- History of Women in the United States: State-by-State Reference
- Real Women of Tampa and Hillsborough County: From Prehistory to the Millennium
- Encyclopedia of American Women during World War II
- Women and American Politics: History and Milestones
- They Dared to Dream: Florida Women Who Shaped History (2015)
- Women in the Literary Landscape
- Victory for the Vote: The Fight for Women's Suffrage and the Century that Followed
