= Doris L. Payne =

American linguist

Doris Lander Payne (born 1952) is an American linguist and professor emerita of linguistics at the University of Oregon. Her research specializes in the morphosyntax of understudied languages, including indigenous languages of the Americas, Nilotic languages and especially Maasai of East Africa, languages of West Africa, Austronesian languages, and others.

== Education and research ==
Payne received her PhD in linguistics from the University of California, Los Angeles in 1985, with a dissertation on the Yagua language entitled Aspects of the Grammar of Yagua: A Typological Perspective. After completing her dissertation, she took up an academic position at the University of Oregon, becoming a full professor there in 2002. She is also a linguistics consultant for SIL International.

She is known for her widely cited research on topics such as external possession (Barshi & Payne 1999), information structuring in O'odham (previously sometimes called Papago) (Payne 1987), the pragmatics of word order (Payne 1992), and noun classification systems (Derbyshire & Payne 1990, Seifart & Payne 2007).

From 1998 to 2003, Payne led an National Science Foundation-funded research project on the Maasai language. A dictionary and other language documentation resources resulted from the project. From 2013 to 2019, she led an National Science Foundation-funded research project aimed at documenting the Nivaclé and Pilagá languages of northern Argentina.

== Honors ==
Payne is co-editor-in-chief of the International Journal of American Linguistics.

== Selected publications ==
- Barshi, Immanuel & Doris L. Payne (eds). 1999. External Possession. John Benjamins. DOI: https://doi.org/10.1075/tsl.39
- Derbyshire, Desmond C. & Doris L. Payne. 1990. Noun Classification Systems of Amazonian Languages. In Payne, Doris L. (ed.), Amazonian Linguistics, Studies in Lowland South American Languages, 243–271. Austin: University of Texas Press.
- Payne, Doris L. 1987. Information structuring in Papago narrative discourse. Language 63, 783–804.
- Payne, Doris L. 1992. Pragmatics of Word Order Flexibility. John Benjamins. DOI: https://doi.org/10.1075/tsl.22
- Seifart, Frank & Doris L. Payne. 2007. Nominal Classification in the North West Amazon: Issues in Areal Diffusion and Typological Characterization. International Journal of American Linguistics 73, 381–387. https://doi.org/10.1086/523770.
