= Doris Cohen =

American aeronautical engineer

Doris Cohen was a twentieth-century American mathematician and aerodynamicist. She worked at the Langley Memorial Aeronautical Laboratory of the National Advisory Committee for Aeronautics (NACA, a precursor to NASA). In 1941, a research report she published made her NACA's first female author.

She was married to, and worked with, aerodynamicist R. T. Jones. With him, she co-founded Vega Instrument Co., a telescope manufacturing company, in 1957.

== Bibliography ==
1. An Analysis of the Stability of an Airplane with Free Controls with Robert T. Jones (1941)
2. A Graphical Method of Determining Pressure Distribution in Two-dimensional Flow with Robert T. Jones (1941)
3. Theoretical Distribution of Load over a Swept-back Wing (1942)
4. A method for determining the camber and twist of a surface to support a given distribution of lift (1942)
5. Determination of optimum plan forms for control surfaces with Robert T. Jones (1942)
6. A Theoretical Investigation of the Rolling Oscillations of an Airplane with Ailerons Free (1944)
7. Analytical Investigation of the Stability of an F8F Dropping Model with Automatic Stabilization (1945)
8. A method for determining the camber and twist of a surface to support a given distribution of lift, with applications to the load over a sweptback wing (1945)
9. The Theoretical Lift of Flat Swept-back Wings at Supersonic Speeds (1948)
10. Theoretical Loading at Supersonic Speeds of Flat Swept-back Wings with Interacting Trailing and Leading Edges (1949)
11. Formulas and Charts for the Supersonic Lift and Drag of Flat Swept-back Wings with Interacting Leading and Trailing Edges (1950)
12. Formulas for the Supersonic Loading, Lift, and Drag of Flat Swept-Back Wings with Leading Edges Behind the Mach Line (1951)
13. Theoretical Investigation of the Supersonic Lift and Drag of Thin, Sweptback Wings with Increased Sweep near the Root with Morris D. Friedman (1953)
14. Arrangement of Fusiform Bodies to Reduce the Wave Drag at Supersonic Speeds with Morris D Friedman (1954)
