= Scharfenberg Castle =

Scharfenberg Castle may refer to:

- Scharfenberg Castle (Brilon), a castle in the Hochsauerland, Germany
- Scharfenberg Castle (Donzdorf), a former castle of the counts of Rechberg
- Scharfenberg Castle (Palatinate), a ruined hill castle in the Palatinate, Germany
- Schloss Scharfenberg, a stately home in Saxony, Germany
