= Doris Gontersweiler-Vetterli =

Swiss swimmer

Personal information
- Born: 21 August 1933 Zürich, Switzerland

Sport
- Sport: Swimming

Doris Gontersweiler-Vetterli (born 21 August 1933) is a Swiss former backstroke swimmer. She competed at the 1948, 1952 and the 1960 Summer Olympics.
