= Doris E. Lewis =

Canadian librarian

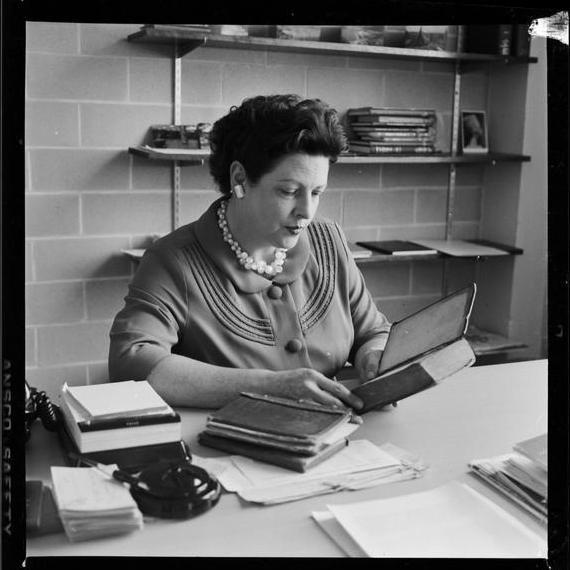
- Born: July 20, 1911; Toronto, Ontario, Canada
- Died: May 23, 1985 (aged 73)
- Education: University of Toronto
- Occupation: Librarian
- Awards: Queen Elizabeth II Silver Jubilee Medal

Doris Eileen Lewis (née Pringle) was a Canadian librarian who served as the first University Librarian at the University of Waterloo.

== Early life and education ==
Lewis was born July 20, 1911, in Toronto, Ontario. She graduated from the University of Toronto (U of T) in 1933 and received a diploma in library sciences the following year. As a student at the U of T Lewis as vice-president of her class and a member of the Acta Victoriana Board. In 1963 Lewis completed a bachelor of library science, once again from the U of T.

== Career ==
Lewis started her career in libraries at the U of T working in the circulation department from 1934 to 1936. After marrying and starting a family, she returned to professional life. In 1949 she joined Waterloo College as a lecturer in library science, taking on the role of chief librarian in 1951. Following the establishment of the University of Waterloo in 1959, Lewis was named the school's first University Librarian.

Interested in the lives of women, Lewis played an instrumental role in the acquisition of the Lady Aberdeen Library on the History of Women, donated to the University of Waterloo Library by the National Council of Women of Canada in 1967. The library had been amassed by the group between 1954 and 1965 as a Canadian Centennial project. Lewis also played a key role in the design of the Dana Porter Library preparing the briefing reports that would inform its construction. By 1969 book volumes at Waterloo's library had increased to 300,000 and was growing at a rate of 60,000 volumes per year. After stepping down as University Librarian in 1969, Lewis continued on at the university as a collections development librarian until her retirement in 1976. The same year the school's Special Collections & Archives department was founded with the naming of the Doris Lewis Rare Book Room. Post-retirement, Lewis worked as consultant to the book-dealer B. H. Blackwell Ltd, Oxford.

In addition to her work as a librarian, Lewis served as president of the Canadian Association of University Libraries and was the first chair of the Ontario Association of College and University Libraries. Lewis was also a member of two commissions aimed at assessing post-secondary education beginning with the Commission on the Financing of Higher Education (the Bladen Commission) in 1965 on which she worked with Robert H. Blackburn and Brian R. Land of the U of T. The following year she assisted with the preparation of briefs for the Commission to Study the Development of Graduate Programmes in Ontario Universities (Spinks Commission). Lewis later participated in the Federal Government Library Survey between 1972 and 1974. She also acted as a consultant about the design of the Trent University's library.

== Later life and legacy ==
Lewis received an honorary doctorate from Trent in 1969. She was also awarded the Canadian Silver Jubilee Medal in 1977 in recognition of her service to the profession. In 1982 the University of Waterloo awarded her with a 25th Anniversary Medal.

Of her impending retirement, Lewis expressed pride about having been with the University of Waterloo Library since its founding and explained: "You can't just cut off a part of your life without missing it." Lewis died on May 23, 1985.
