= Amanda Gray Hilyer =

Entrepreneur, pharmacist, civic worker, civil rights activist (1870–1957)

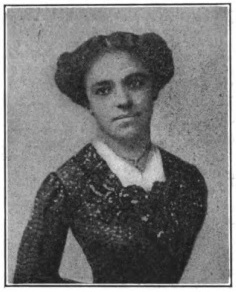
- Pictured in the Pharmaceutical Era, 1912
- Born: Amanda Victoria Brown; 24 March 1870; Atchison, Kansas
- Died: 29 June 1957 (aged 87); Washington D.C.
- Resting place: Columbian Harmony Cemetery
- Education: Howard University
- Occupations: Entrepreneur, pharmacist, civic worker, civil rights activist
- Organization(s): NAACP, Phillis Wheatley YWCA, National Medical Association
- Known for: Being the first African American woman to own and operate a pharmacy in Washington D.C.
- Spouse(s): Arthur S Gray (1893–1917); Andrew F. Hilyer (1923–1925)

Amanda Gray Hilyer (24 March 1870 – 29 June 1957) was an African American entrepreneur, pharmacist, civic worker, and civil rights activist. She was the first black woman to own and operate a pharmacy in Washington D.C.

== Early life ==
Amanda Victoria Brown was born in Atchison, Kansas on 24 March 1870. She attended public schools in Kansas and married, aged 23 in 1893, pharmacist Arthur S. Gray (1869–1917). In around 1897, the couple moved to Washington D.C., and she attended Howard University. She obtained her pharmaceutical graduate degree in 1903.

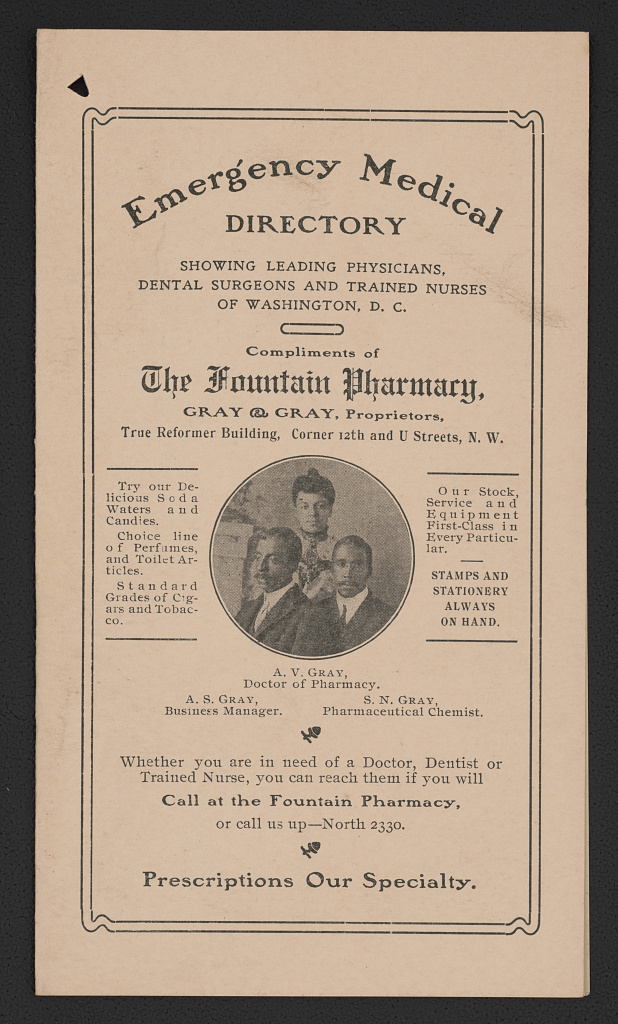
Pamphlet produced by Fountain Pharmacy, showing Amanda and Arthur Gray

== Washington D.C. ==
Gray initially worked as a pharmacist for the Woman's Clinic in Washington, before partnering with Arthur and opening the Fountain Pharmacy in 1905. The Grays' pharmacy, at 12th and U Streets NW, sat in the heart of the black commercial district, and the couple became an active part of Washington's African American elite. Fountain Pharmacy was described as:

a large, bright, airy, well-equipped store that compares with any in the city. Aside from the prescription department, in which are two regular and two relief clerks, [it] has a branch post office, telegraph office and laundry agency.

The couple were involved in a variety of social, civic, and professional organizations, including the National Medical Association, the NAACP, and the Samuel Coleridge-Taylor Choral Society. Arthur Gray acted as treasurer of the latter society. Gray acted as secretary of the Treble Clef Club, and was a member of the Booklovers Club. She helped to establish the Phillis Wheatley Young Women's Christian Association (YWCA) in Washington, and became its first recording secretary in 1905.

After Arthur's death in 1917, at the age of 48, Gray closed the pharmacy they had operated together. She joined World War I efforts, and became a director of YWCA camp hostesses for Black soldiers. She went on to become President of the Phillis Wheatley YWCA, holding the position for three years.

In 1923, Gray married Andrew Franklin Hilyer (1858–1925), a lawyer, author, and civil rights leader, who had been born enslaved. Hilyer and his first wife, Mamie, had been known to the Grays, and active in many of the same circles. Andrew F. Hilyer died in 1925, after two years of marriage.

== Post-1925 ==
Hilyer continued her civic and social activities, and was active in a wide range of organizations. She was a life-member of the Association for the Study of African American Life and History, and President and member of the board of the Ionia R. Whipper Home for Unwed Mothers. Ionia Rollin Whipper (1872-1953) was Hilyer's contemporary at Howard University, and was herself a reformer. She was a member of the Citizens Committee for Freedmen's Hospital Nurses, the National Association of Colored Graduate Nurses, and President of the Alumni Association at Howard University. Hilyer was a member of the Inter-Racial Committee of the District of Columbia, organized by the NAACP, of which she was a life-member. She was also involved in helping to preserve the Frederick Douglass House in Anacostia.

== Death and legacy ==
Gray Hilyer died at home on 29 June 1957, after suffering a stroke. She was 87 years old. Her beneficiaries included Berean Baptist Church, where her funeral was held, and to which she funded a window in memory of her husband, Arthur Gray. She also left significant contributions to the Ionia Whipper Home, and to Howard University, as well as fifty dollars each to the Phillis Wheatley YWCA and Stoddard Baptist Home. She was buried in Columbian Harmony Cemetery, with her first husband. She was remembered as a woman who 'dedicated her life to the educational, social, and moral uplift of black people, particularly those in Washington D.C'.
