= Doris Scharfenberg =

American television producer

Doris Ann Scharfenberg (February 24, 1917 – January 4, 2009) was a US television producer who was one of the first women TV executives at NBC. She won an Emmy award in 1973.
