= Doris Peick =

American politician

Member of the Iowa House of Representatives from the 52nd district
- In office January 10, 1983 – January 11, 1987
- Preceded by: Warren Johnson
- Succeeded by: Ron Corbett

Personal details
- Born: September 22, 1933 Martelle, Iowa
- Died: July 4, 2012 (aged 78) Cedar Rapids, Iowa
- Party: Democratic

Doris Peick (September 22, 1933 – July 4, 2012) was an American politician who served in the Iowa House of Representatives from the 52nd district from 1983 to 1987.

She died on July 4, 2012, in Cedar Rapids, Iowa at age 78.
