= Doris Kuhlmann-Wilsdorf =

German-American metallurgist and materials scientist

- Born: February 15, 1922
- Died: March 25, 2010 (aged 88); Charlottesville, Virginia
- Spouse: Heinz G. F. Wilsdorf
- Children: Gabriele and Michael

Doris Kuhlmann-Wilsdorf (February 15, 1922 – March 25, 2010) was a German metallurgist.

== Early life and education ==
Doris Kuhlmann was born in Bremen, Germany on February 15, 1922, to Adolph Friedrich and Elsa Kuhlmann. She attended the University of Göttingen from 1942 where she received her doctorate in materials science in 1947. Kuhlmann-Wilsdorf continued her research under Sir Nevill Francis Mott at the University of Bristol. She married Heinz Wilsdorf in 1950, with whom she travelled to University of the Witwatersrand to work as a lecturer in the same year. She used the surname Kuhlmann-Wilsdorf from then on.

== Career ==
In 1956 the couple moved to the United States. In 1957, the University of Pennsylvania School of Engineering and Applied Science appointed Doris Kuhlmann-Wilsdorf, B.S., M.S., Ph.D., a mechanical metallurgist, to the faculty position of research associate professor of metallurgical engineering (the present-day department of Materials Science and Engineering), effective July 1, 1957. She was the first woman to join the standing faculty of the School of Engineering and Applied Science at the university.

In 1960, the school reappointed her and changed her title to associate professor of metallurgy. She was therefore the first woman to earn tenure in the School of Engineering and Applied Science. Just one year later, in July 1961, the school promoted her to professor of metallurgical engineering, making Kuhlmann-Wilsdorf the first woman to hold a senior professorship at the School of Engineering and Applied Science. In 1963, however, Professor Kuhlmann-Wilsdorf left Penn to accept an appointment as professor of engineering physics at the University of Virginia as a professor in the Physics and Materials Science departments. She was named university professor of applied science in 1966; she was the first woman named as a full professor at the University of Virginia outside the schools of Medicine and Nursing.

In 1994 Kuhlmann-Wilsdorf and her husband funded a professorship in their name and former students created a memorial building on the campus in their name in 2001.

Kuhlmann-Wilsdorf retired in 2005 and died after a short illness on March 25, 2010, in Charlottesville, Virginia. Her papers are held at the Albert and Shirley Small Special Collections Library at the University of Virginia.

== Research ==
Kuhlmann-Wilsdorf published over 250 papers and was a consultant to a number of corporations. Her research was primarily in metallurgy and materials science (with her expertise in tribology), known for her design of electrical metal fiber brushes used as sliding electrical contacts. She was a fellow of the American Physical Society and the American Society of Metals.

== Honors and awards ==
- Medal for Excellence in Research of the American Society of Engineering Education (1965 and 1966)
- Heyn Medal of the German Society of Materials Science (1988)
- Society of Women Engineers Achievement Award (1989)
- Ragnar Holm Scientific Achievement Award of the Institute of Electrical and Electronics Engineers (1991)
- Christopher J. Henderson Inventor of the Year (2001)
- Fellow of TMS-AIME (2006)
