= Doris M. Green =

British philatelist

Doris Mary Green (6 August 1904 – 11 March 1999) was a British philatelist who was added to the Roll of Distinguished Philatelists in 1970.
