= Doris Evans McGinty =

American professor of music (1925–2005)

Doris Evans McGinty (February 8, 1925 – April 5, 2005) was a professor in the Department of Music at Howard University from 1947 until 1991. McGinty was chair of the department for eight years, and contributed to numerous publications, including the New Grove Dictionary of American Music, Black Women in American Music, and the American Dictionary of Negro Biography. She was a contributing editor to The Black Perspective in Music from 1975 until her retirement in 1991.

== Biography ==
McGinty was born in Washington, D.C., and graduated from Dunbar Senior High School in 1941. She earned a bachelor's degree in music education at Howard University in 1945, and a B.A. in German in 1946. She was also employed as a librarian in the music department of the Library of Congress. McGinty went on to attend Radcliffe College in Cambridge, Massachusetts, where she was the only African American in her class, obtaining a master of arts degree in one year, before returning in 1947 to teach at Howard. She subsequently went on a Fulbright fellowship to study at Oxford University, where in 1953 she became the first American to receive a doctorate of musicology.
