= Catherine Ives =

Catherine Ives was the pen name of British writer Doris Ives Smith (1888–1951). In addition to many magazine articles, especially in Britannia and Eve, Ives wrote two well-known cookbooks.

== Selected works ==
- When The Cook Is Away, published in 1928, was "...intended to come to the rescue of people whose kitchens have been deprived of their cooks, and who know nothing about cooking themselves." The book has a famous cover, designed by a young Cecil Beaton. The book addresses some of the dramatic post WW1 social changes and associated changes in cookery A 1934 enlarged edition is renamed, Catherine Ives' Cookery Book: A Much Enlarged and Thoroughly Revised Edition of "When the Cook is Away" with New Chapters on Cakes, Savouries, and Left-overs.
- Good Meals For Hard Times, published in 1940, had an emphasis on economy and cheerfulness. She wrote, "Some of the dishes which are still favourites in my own household made their first appearance there during the last war." Rationing had just begun, and she wrote "no one knows yet how many foodstuffs may have to be rationed, or what the amount of those rations may be."
