= Doris McKellar =

Australian photographer

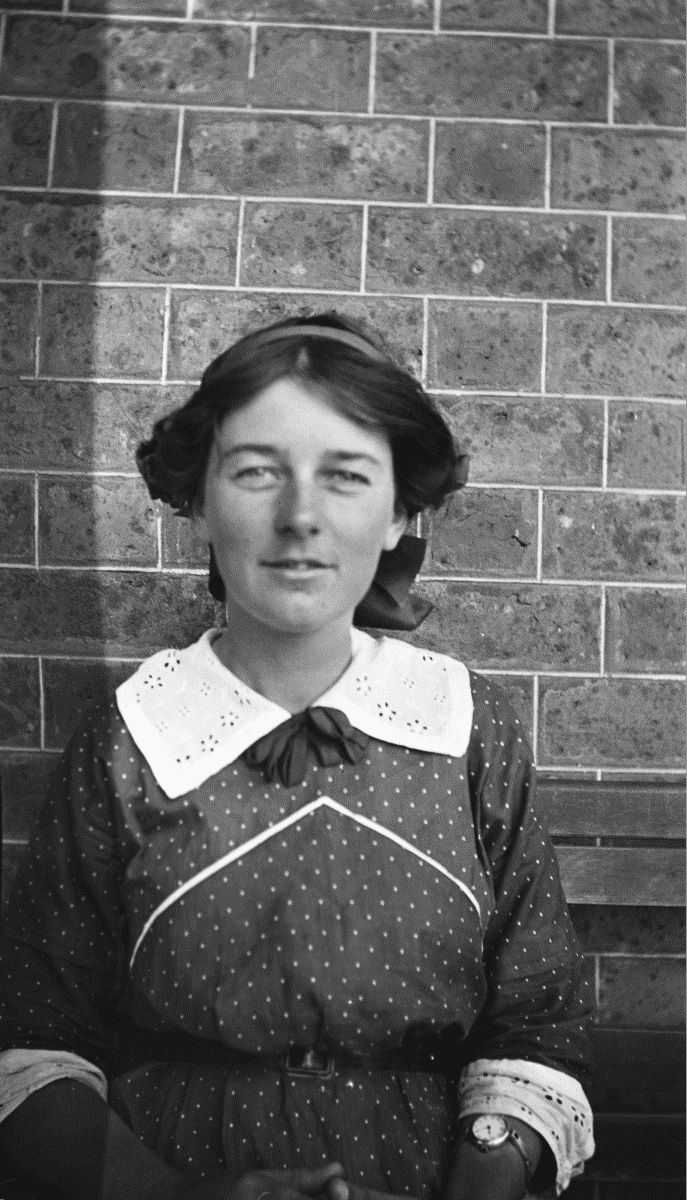
Doris Mckellar c.1917

Doris Winifred McKellar (1897–1984), born Doris Winifred Hall was an Australian photographer, born in Melbourne.

McKellar grew up in an affluent Melbourne household as the eldest daughter of solicitor Percival St John Hall and Harriet Louisa Hall. She attended Cromarty School for girls in Elsternwick, Victoria and was awarded dux of her school as a result of high academic achievement. After leaving high school McKellar enrolled in a Bachelor of Arts at The University of Melbourne and completed her degree in 1918.

McKellar is best known for her photographs documenting campus life at the University of Melbourne around the time of the First World War. Original photographs taken by McKellar, along with her camera and a developing tank, were acquired by the University of Melbourne Archives in 1975.
