= Doris E. Smith =

Irish writer

Doris Edna Elliott Smith
- Born: 12 August 1919; Dublin, Ireland
- Died: Before 1994
- Occupation: Novelist
- Writing career
- Pen name: Doris E. Smith
- Language: English
- Period: 1966–1982
- Genres: Gothic, romance
- Notable awards: RoNA Award

Doris Edna Smith (née Elliott) (12 August 1919 – before 1994) was an Irish writer of over 20 gothic and romance novels. In 1969, her novel Comfort and Keep won the Romantic Novel of the Year Award by the Romantic Novelists' Association.

She was educated at Alexandra College in Milltown, Dublin. From 1938 worked for an Dublin's insurance group.

== Bibliography ==
- Song from a Lemon Tree (1966)
- The Thornwood (1966)
- The Deep are Dumb (1967)
- Comfort and Keep (1968)
- Fire Is for Sharing (1968)
- To Sing Me Home (1969)
- Seven of Magpies (1970)
- Cup of Kindness (1971)
- Young Green Corn (1971)
- Dear Deceiver (1972)
- The One and Only (1973)
- The Marrying Kind (1974)
- Green Apple Love (1974)
- Haste to the Wedding (1974)
- Cotswold Honey (1975)
- Smuggled Love (1976)
- Wild Heart (1976)
- My Love Come Back (1978)
- Mix Me a Man (1979)
- Back O'the Moon (1981)
- Catch a Kingfisher (1981)
- Marmalade Witch (1982)
- Noah's Daughter (1982)
