= Doris M. Modly =

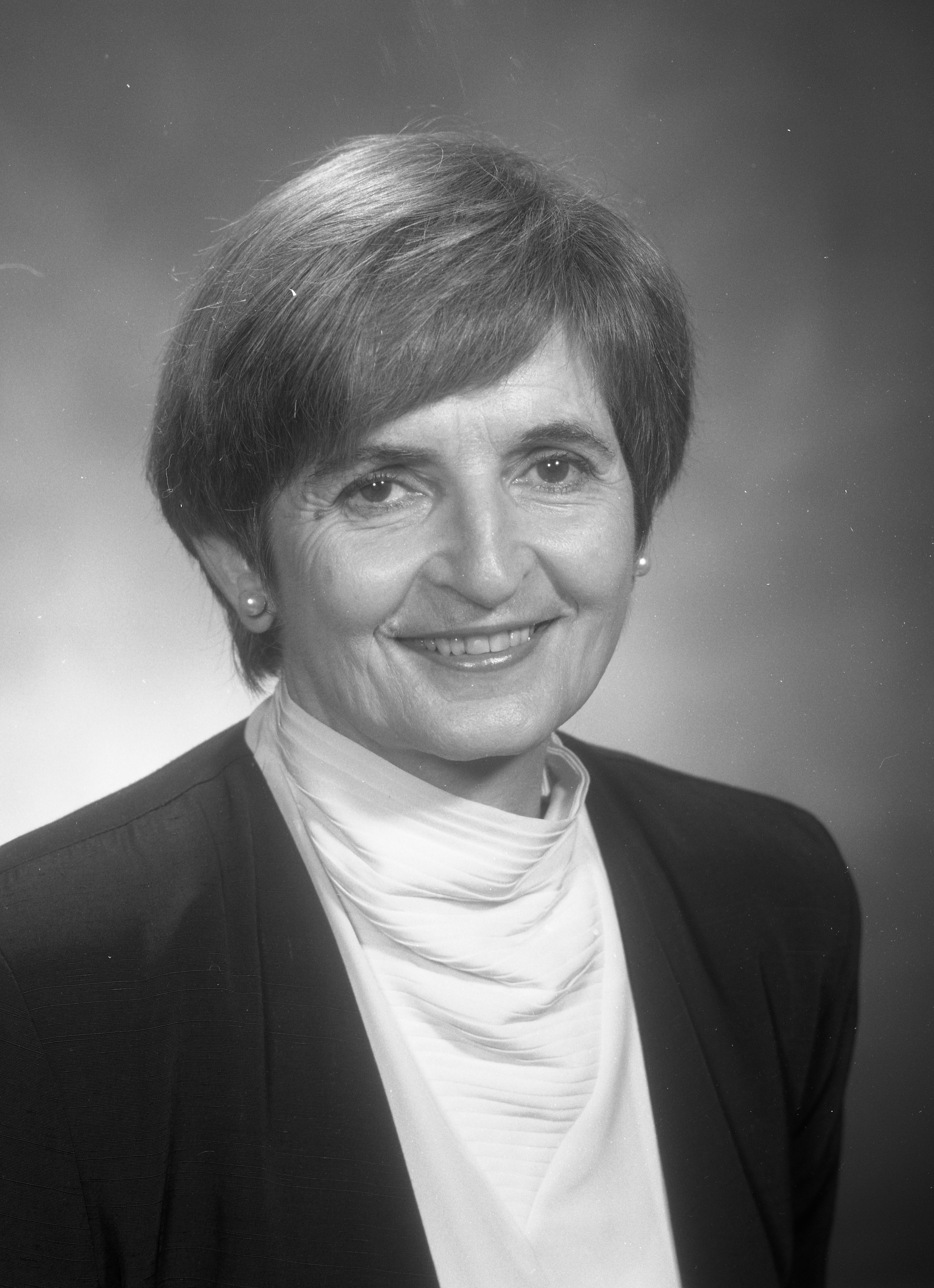
- Born: January 20, 1933
- Died: March 17, 2018 (aged 85)
- Education: Case Western Reserve University (1957 B.S.A., 1977 M.S.N. ,1983 M.A., 1987 Ph.D.)
- Spouse: Zoltan Modly
- Children: Charlotte, Thomas, Mira, Dora-Maria, and Suzanne Modly
- Parent(s): Otto Conrad and Mira Bertani

Doris M. Modly (née Matherny; January 20, 1933 – March 17, 2018) was a Director of International Health Programs at Case Western Reserve University's (CWRU) Frances Payne Bolton School of Nursing, Director of the World Health Organization's Center for Research and Clinical Training in Home Care Nursing at CWRU (now Pan American Health Organization/World Health Organization Collaborating Center, PAHO/WHO), a Professor Nursing at CWRU, and a Consultant for the World Health Organization European Office for Nursing. During her time at CWRU she aided in the development of the doctorate in nursing program and the bachelor of science in nursing program. She is most notable for her work in Central East Europe, especially Hungary, where she established nursing education programs at the university level. Modly received the Officers Cross of the Order of Merit of the Republic of Hungary, Pro Cultura Hungarcia, and the J. William Fulbright Foreign Scholarship for her efforts in advancing nursing in the country.

== Early life ==
Doris M. Modly was born to parents Otto Conrad and Mira (née Bertani) Matherny on January 20, 1933, in a section of Yugoslavia that was part of Hungary until 1936. As a result of World War II, Modly was separated from her parents for a period of time before reuniting in Austria in 1951 at the age of eighteen. She immigrated to the United States of America as a high school student in 1952 speaking three languages: German, Serbo-Croatian, and Hungarian. On June 5, 1957, she married Zoltan Modly and together they had five children: Charlotte, Thomas, Dora-Maria, Suzanne, and Mira Modly. Doris M. Modly died March 17, 2018, at the age of eighty-five.

== Education ==
- 1957 B.S.N. Case Western Reserve University
- 1977 M.S.N. Case Western Reserve University
- 1983 M.A. Medical Anthropology, Case Western Reserve University
- 1987 Ph.D. Nursing, Case Western Reserve University

== Career ==
=== CWRU work ===
Modly joined Case Western Reserve University in 1977 aiding in the development of CWRU's doctor in nursing program, the first of its kind in the world, as well as the bachelor of science nursing program. In 1979 she became as an Assistant Professor of Psychiatric Mental Health and remained in the position until 1982 eventually serving in the role again from 1988 until 1989. From 1982 until 1985 she acted as the Senior Instructor of Psychiatric Mental Health. Modly also performed the job of an Assistant Professor of Acute and Critical Care from 1980 through 1990. From 1994 to 1996 she worked as Associate Professor of Nursing before being promoted to Professor of Nursing. Additionally, Modly was Director of the B.S.N. and N.D. programs and Director of the International Health Program. On July 1, 1998, she was appointed as Professor Emerita of Nursing at CWRU.

As Director of the Pan American Health Organization/World Health Organization Collaborating Center, PAHO/WHO at Case Western Reserve University (formerly, the World Health Organization's Collaborating Center for Research and Clinical Training in Home Care Nursing) Modly developed international nursing programs geared towards development of education, practice, research, and leadership for primary care.

=== Foreign work ===
Modly's service spanned Central and East Europe where she as a consultant for the World Health Organization European Office of Nursing; there she facilitated the reconstruction and improvement of nursing programs. Her service also touched Latin America and Africa where she functioned as a program consultant. Modly's work is most recognized in Hungary where as a senior nursing education fellow of Project HOPE as a fellow she reconstructed the nursing programs from the established practice of vocational training to baccalaureate in nursing programs by developing the curriculum to a standard that matched the western world and complied with the Europe Nursing Council guidelines. Her success in the country was in part due to her ability to speak Hungarian, enabling her to earn the trust of her students and teach in the native tongue. Her efforts established the first baccalaureate program in the country which is part of the School of Health Sciences at the University of Pecs.

=== J. William Fulbright Foreign Scholarship ===
In 1996, Doris M. Modly was given a J. William Fulbright Foreign Scholarship to continue her service in the development of Hungary's first baccalaureate nursing program. The scholarship allowed her to spend five months in Hungary giving faculty development workshops in four extensions of the University of Pecs nursing program, seminars of nursing research and nursing issues, and teach how psychiatric mental health related to death, dying, and bereavement. Additionally, the timing of her trip (early 1997) enabled her to see the graduation of the first nursing students with baccalaureate diplomas. She was the first nurse-educator to be a Fulbright scholar in Hungary.

The scholarship also permitted her to work with the World Health Organization Collaborating Center for Nursing in Budapest and the University of Maribor in Slovenia. Additionally, through the program she continued her research from CWRU on how women from different cultures cope with breast cancer.

=== Publications ===
- "An Adaptation of Ego Function Assessment Techniques During Transactions with a Schizophrenic Existence"
- "Paranoid States"
- "Comparison of Teaching Behaviors Used by Nurse Practitioner and Physician Faculty Teaching Primary Care"
- Home Care Nursing Services: International Lessons
- Member of the editorial board of Nover: the Hungarian Nursing Journal
- Member of the editorial council of the Latin American Journal of Nursing.

== Honors and awards ==
=== Officers Cross of the Order of Merit of the Republic Of Hungary ===
President of the Republic of Hungary, Arpad Goncz, awarded Doris M. Modly the Officers Cross of the Order of Merit of the Republic of Hungary on August 10, 1993, for her work in the advancing the nursing education programs in Hungary. The award recognized her efforts to introduce the first baccalaureate program in nursing through several universities across the country.

=== Pro Cultura Hungarcia ===
On May 29, 1997, the secretary of education for the Republic of Hungary, Bálint Magyar, presented Modly with "Pro Cultura Hungarcia" medal in Budapest. Hungarian Republic's of Department of Education created the annual award in 1991 in order to honor citizens of foreign countries whose educational activities in Hungary received the highest recognition while simultaneously playing an important and outstanding role to disseminate Hungarian and other nations culture abroad. The award was given on account of Modly's six years of work to advance nursing education from vocational and secondary schools to higher levels of education in Hungary. Modly was the first nurse-educator to receive the award.

=== Other awards ===
- Proclamation of Congratulations: Mayor of the City of Cleveland 1994
- Fellow of the American Academy of Nursing 1995
- Certificate of Appreciation: Project HOPE 1995
- Who's Who in American Nursing 1995
- Who's Who in Medicine and Healthcare 1996
- Distinguished Alumna Award- Frances Payne Bolton School of Nursing 1997
