= Doris Uboh-Ogunkoya =

Nigerian politician

- Born: 1964-06-16
- Occupation: Politician
- Political party: All Progressives Congress

Doris Uboh-Ogunkoya (born 16 June 1964) is a Nigerian politician from Ekuku-Agbor Delta state

Appointed as the Executive Director, Rural Electrification Fund (REF) by President Bola Tinubu on March 8, 2024.

== Career ==
Uboh-Ogunkoya represented Ika Federal constituency Delta state from 2007 to 2011

In 2019 she won the All Progressives Congress Senatorial ticket in the primaries to represent Delta North Senatorial District

She also won the primaries under the All Progressives Congress to represent Ika Federal constituency in the 2023 General elections
