= Swimming at the 1968 Summer Olympics – Women's 200 metre backstroke =

Women's 200 metre backstroke at the Games of the XIX Olympiad
- Venue: Alberca Olímpica Francisco Márquez
- Date: 25 October 1968 (heats & final)
- Competitors: 30 from 19 nations
- Winning time: 2:24.8 OR

Medalists
1st place, gold medalist(s)		Lillian Watson	United States
2nd place, silver medalist(s)		Elaine Tanner	Canada
3rd place, bronze medalist(s)		Kaye Hall	United States

The women's 200 metre backstroke event at the 1968 Olympic Games took place 25 October. This swimming event used backstroke. Because an Olympic size swimming pool is 50 metres long, this race consisted of four lengths of the pool. This was the first appearance for this event in the Olympics for the women swimmers.

== Results ==
=== Heats ===
Heat 1

Rank	Athlete	Country	Time	Note
1	Kaye Hall	United States	2:31.1	
2	Coby Sikkens	Netherlands	2:36.9	
3	Jeanne Warren	Canada	2:37.9	
4	Anne Walton	Canada	2:39.4	
5	Jacqueline Brown	Great Britain	2:40.0	
6	Tina Lek'veishvili	Soviet Union	2:40.5	
7	Francine Dauven	Belgium	2:43.5	

Heat 2

Rank	Athlete	Country	Time	Note
1	María Corominas	Spain	2:34.5	
2	Tatyana Savelyeva	Soviet Union	2:35.5	
3	Ulla Patrikka	Finland	2:38.1	
4	Kiki Caron	France	2:40.5	

Heat 3

Rank	Athlete	Country	Time	Note
1	Lynne Watson	Australia	2:33.5	
2	Susie Atwood	United States	2:35.2	
3	Bep Weeteling	Netherlands	2:35.4	
4	Anca Andreiu	Romania	2:38.8	
5	María Procopio	Argentina	2:49.2	

Heat 4

Rank	Athlete	Country	Time	Note
1	Elaine Tanner	Canada	2:30.9	
2	Wendy Burrell	Great Britain	2:33.2	
3	Doris Kohardt	East Germany	2:34.7	
4	Angelika Kraus	West Germany	2:36.7	
5	Glenda Stirling	New Zealand	2:40.3	
6	Carmen Ferracuti	El Salvador	2:52.6	

Heat 5

Rank	Athlete	Country	Time	Note
1	Lillian Watson	United States	2:29.2	
2	Zdenka Gašparač	Yugoslavia	2:33.7	
3	Bénédicte Duprez	France	2:34.5	
4	Sylvie Canet	France	2:36.1	
5	Yvette Hafner	Austria	2:37.7	
6	Patricia Sentous	Argentina	2:41.5	
7	Felicia Ospitaletche	Uruguay	2:51.4	
8	Rosa Hasbún	El Salvador	2:56.2	

=== Final ===
Rank	Athlete	Country	Time	Notes
1	Lillian Watson	United States	2:24.8	OR
2	Elaine Tanner	Canada	2:27.4	
3	Kaye Hall	United States	2:28.9	
4	Lynne Watson	Australia	2:29.5	
5	Wendy Burrell	Great Britain	2:32.3	
6	Zdenka Gašparač	Yugoslavia	2:33.5	
7	María Corominas	Spain	2:33.9	
8	Bénédicte Duprez	France	2:36.6	

Key: OR = Olympic record
