= Swimming at the 1968 Summer Olympics – Women's 100 metre backstroke =

Women's 100 metre backstroke at the Games of the XIX Olympiad
- Venue: Alberca Olímpica Francisco Márquez
- Date: 22 October 1968 (heats & semi-finals); 23 October 1968 (final)
- Competitors: 41 from 24 nations
- Winning time: 1:06.2 WR

Medalists
1st place, gold medalist(s)		Kaye Hall	United States
2nd place, silver medalist(s)		Elaine Tanner	Canada
3rd place, bronze medalist(s)		Jane Swagerty	United States

The women's 100 metre backstroke event at the 1968 Olympic Games took place between 22 and 23 October. This swimming event used backstroke. Because an Olympic-size swimming pool is 50 metres long, this race consisted of two lengths of the pool.

== Records ==
Prior to this competition, the existing world and Olympic records were as follows.

World record	Karen Muir (RSA)	1:06.4	Paris, France	6 April 1968
Olympic record	Cathy Ferguson (USA)	1:07.7	Tokyo, Japan	14 October 1964

The following new world and Olympic records were set during this competition.

Date	Event	Name	Nationality	Time	Record
23 October 1968	Final	Kaye Hall	United States	1:06.2	WR

== Results ==
=== Heats ===
Heat 1

Rank	Athlete	Country	Time	Note
1	Yukiko Goushi	Japan	1:10.2	Q
2	Glenda Stirling	New Zealand	1:10.2	Q
3	Kiki Caron	France	1:10.5	Q
4	Bep Weeteling	Netherlands	1:12.5	
5	Jacqueline Brown	Great Britain	1:13.0	
6	Lidia Ramírez	Mexico	1:14.5	
7	Hedy García	Philippines	DNS	

Heat 2

Rank	Athlete	Country	Time	Note
1	Zdenka Gašparač	Yugoslavia	1:09.9	Q
2	Jane Swagerty	United States	1:10.2	Q
3	Andrea Gyarmati	Hungary	1:11.3	Q
4	Yvette Hafner	Austria	1:11.8	
5	Adriana Comolli	Argentina	1:13.8	
6	Doris Meister	West Germany	1:14.1	
7	Rosa Hasbún	El Salvador	1:20.5	

Heat 3

Rank	Athlete	Country	Time	Note
1	Elaine Tanner	Canada	1:07.6	Q
2	Lynne Watson	Australia	1:09.4	Q
3	María Corominas	Spain	1:10.7	Q
4	Ulla Patrikka	Finland	1:11.6	Q
5	Angelika Kraus	West Germany	1:12.6	
6	Felicia Ospitaletche	Uruguay	1:17.7	
7	Nguyễn Thị Mỹ Lien	Vietnam	1:19.2	

Heat 4

Rank	Athlete	Country	Time	Note
1	Kendis Moore	United States	1:10.5	Q
2	Tatyana Savelyeva	Soviet Union	1:11.7	
3	Anca Andreiu	Romania	1:11.8	
4	Dianna Rickard	Australia	1:12.4	
5	Anne Walton	Canada	1:13.0	
6	María Procopio	Argentina	1:15.9	
7	Shen Bao-ni	Taiwan	1:21.5	

Heat 5

Rank	Athlete	Country	Time	Note
1	Sylvie Canet	France	1:10.4	Q
2	Tina Lek'veishvili	Soviet Union	1:11.3	Q
3	Bénédicte Duprez	France	1:11.6	Q
4	Patricia Sentous	Argentina	1:13.5	
5	Pru Chapman	New Zealand	1:15.2	
6	Carmen Ferracuti	El Salvador	1:17.8	

Heat 6

Rank	Athlete	Country	Time	Note
1	Kaye Hall	United States	1:09.8	Q
2	Cobie Buter	Netherlands	1:10.0	Q
3	Mária Balla-Lantos	Hungary	1:11.9	
4	Coby Sikkens	Netherlands	1:11.9	
5	Wendy Burrell	Great Britain	1:12.0	
6	Francine Dauven	Belgium	1:15.3	
7	Judit Bárányi	Hungary	1:16.0	

=== Semifinals ===
Semifinal 1

Rank	Athlete	Country	Time	Note
1	Lynne Watson	Australia	1:09.0	Q
2	Kendis Moore	United States	1:09.6	Q
3	Glenda Stirling	New Zealand	1:10.1	Q
4	Yukiko Goushi	Japan	1:10.2	
5	Bénédicte Duprez	France	1:10.6	
6	Zdenka Gašparač	Yugoslavia	1:10.8	
7	María Corominas	Spain	1:11.0	
8	Tina Lek'veishvili	Soviet Union	1:11.0	

Semifinal 2

Rank	Athlete	Country	Time	Note
1	Elaine Tanner	Canada	1:07.4	Q
2	Kaye Hall	United States	1:08.2	Q
3	Jane Swagerty	United States	1:08.6	Q
4	Sylvie Canet	France	1:09.0	Q
5	Andrea Gyarmati	Hungary	1:09.9	Q
6	Cobie Buter	Netherlands	1:10.7	
7	Kiki Caron	France	1:10.8	
8	Ulla Patrikka	Finland	1:12.1	

=== Final ===
Rank	Athlete	Country	Time	Notes
1	Kaye Hall	United States	1:06.2	WR
2	Elaine Tanner	Canada	1:06.7	
3	Jane Swagerty	United States	1:08.1	
4	Kendis Moore	United States	1:08.3	
5	Andrea Gyarmati	Hungary	1:09.1	
6	Lynne Watson	Australia	1:09.1	
7	Sylvie Canet	France	1:09.3	
8	Glenda Stirling	New Zealand	1:10.6	

Key: WR = World record
