= Ross Jones (rugby league) =

New Zealand international rugby league player

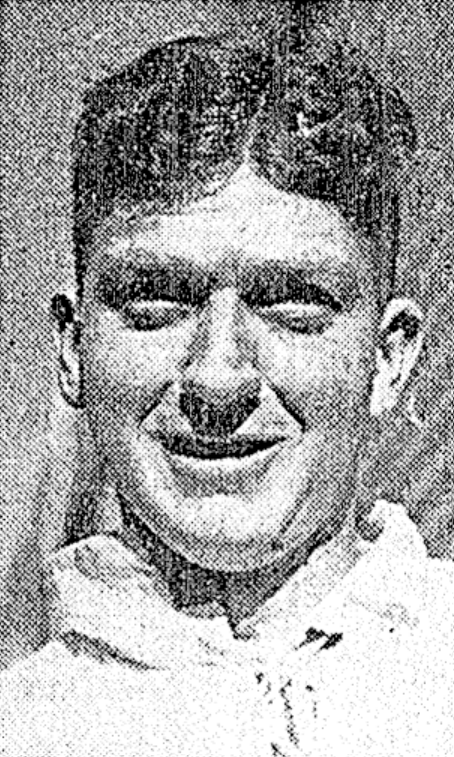

Personal information
- Full name: Ross Darroch Jones
- Born: 9 December 1917 Auckland, New Zealand
- Died: 30 May 1985 (aged 67) Warkworth, New Zealand

Playing information
- Height: 6 ft 4 in (1.93 m)
- Weight: 16 st 8 lb (105 kg)

Rugby union
- Position: Lock
Club
Years	Team	Pld	T	G	FG	P
1936–37	Matakana	27	6	0	0	18
1940	Matakana Barbarians (charity game)	1	2	0	0	6
	Total	28	8	0	0	24
Representative
Years	Team	Pld	T	G	FG	P
1936	Rodney Trial	1	3	0	0	9
1936–37	Rodney (sub-union)	2	0	0	0	0

Rugby league
- Position: Second-row, Lock
Club
Years	Team	Pld	T	G	FG	P
1938	North Shore Albions reserves	1	0	0	0	0
1938–41	North Shore Albions	27	13	0	0	39
	Total	28	13	0	0	39
Representative
Years	Team	Pld	T	G	FG	P
1939	New Zealand Trial	2	0	0	0	0
1939	New Zealand	2	1	0	0	3

Ross Darroch Jones (9 December 1917 – 30 May 1985) was a rugby league player who represented New Zealand. He played in both tour matches on the aborted 1939 tour of England, becoming the 273rd player to represent New Zealand. He was also a junior Auckland cycling champion in 1934, and represented Rodney in rugby union. His eldest son, Murray Jones was an All Black in 1973 against England.

== Early life ==
Ross Jones was born on 9 December 1917, in Auckland, New Zealand. His parents were Donald McLean Jones (1884–1950), and Ida Glenara Jones (1882–1955). Ross had two older brothers, Murray David Jones (1910–40), and Howard Donald Jones (1912–87). Ross lived at 2A Waterview Road, Stanley Bay, in the north shore suburb of Devonport in his youth. He was educated at Stanley Bay Public School (1923–32) and after leaving school he worked as a grocer boy at Farmers, Victoria Street in their Devonport Store as well as being a bike delivery boy in 1933. After this he spent time working for a steel firm building bridges on Quay Street, on the Auckland waterfront with his job being to hand rivet the bridges together. The first bridge he worked on was the Wairoa Bridge between Napier and Gisborne.

== Sporting career ==
=== School sport ===
In 1929, at the age of 11 Jones came second in the boys Stanley Bay School championship (running) final. He was beaten by "V Scott", which was in fact Verdun Scott, a future North Shore Albions and New Zealand rugby league teammate of Jones. Scott also represented New Zealand at cricket. In June, 1929 in a school 'Model Yacht Club' competition, Jones came second in the Robinson Cup and first in the 'Stanley Bay Open'. On 1 March 1930, at the Stanley Bay school's annual sports day at the Stanley Bay Park, Jones came 2nd in the 100m heat and second in the final behind the same runner (A. Beasley).

=== Cycling ===
==== 1933 Takapuna Amateur Cycling Club debut season ====
Jones became a member of the Takapuna Amateur Cycling Club after leaving school and in early 1933 he began competing in their various club races which typically took place on Saturdays. The first event he raced in was in their junior 7.5 mile race on their Takapuna circuit around Lake Pupuke on 8 April. The events were handicapped and Jones won in a time of 33 minutes, 7 seconds. It was not the fastest time but due to the handicap start that he had of 2.5 minutes it allowed him to win. The Auckland Star wrote: "Ross Jones, who rode his first race, did so with all the assurance of a veteran. A strongly built youngster, he gives every indication of becoming a successful rider". On 22 April he finished second in 34:14 in the junior 11.5 mile race after having a 30-second handicap. Takapuna hosted the Lynndale Club on 13 May in their annual exchange. The junior riders completed three laps of their Lake Pupuke course. Jones was riding off scratch and came second, beaten by A.F. Johnson of the Lynndale club by "inches" in a time of 32:40. The Auckland Star commented that Jones "has the makings of a good rider". Then in an invitation race over 22.5 miles on the lake course Jones failed to place in a 51 rider field of juniors and seniors.

On 27 May Jones set a new junior lap record in the 2 lap (7.5 mile) race, beating the former record by 8 seconds with his time of 9:56 for the lap, and 20:17 for the full race. He finished 4th due to riding off scratch while other riders had handicap starts but his time was the fastest. In a combined junior and senior Takapuna club race over 22.5 miles for the King Cup, Jones failed to place despite a 6-minute handicap. A week later on 17 June he won the 11.25 mile lake course race. He was racing off scratch and finished first in a time of 32:03, just 2/5ths of a second ahead of O. McKee.

Jones next race was at the Papatoetoe Amateurs open invitation race on 24 June which went from Papatoetoe to Clevedon and back, a distance of 30 miles. There were 19 riders, with Jones coming first in a time of 94:50, though he started with a handicap of 16 minutes in the senior field. He finished 1 second ahead of R. Gibbs. Jones and Gibbs "set a good even pace, and rode strongly to the finish, Gibbs led out at the sprint, but Jones put in his claim and crossed the line a length to the good. Both the winner and the second man are junior riders and are to be congratulated for their effort". The Auckland Star said of Jones that he "is one of this [Takapuna] club's most promising riders, although a junior member. Ross is a tall, husky youngster with plenty of determination and a bulldog tenacity". Jones competed in the junior New Lynn club race over 6.25 miles on 15 July but didn't place, before racing a week later in a combined senior and junior race of 22.5 miles on the Takapuna course. He was racing off a 4:30 handicap. Jones and M. Laurie, both on the same handicap "did their first couple of laps in record junior time, being only a few second slower than that of the scratch man, and soon overhauled the limit men…". Jones went on to finish 4th, just outside the top 3. The Star said "R. Jones (junior) rides strongly and well, but needs more power in his sprint, as does M. Laurie".

Jones continued his strong rise with a win in the Takapuna junior race over 11.25 miles on 29 July. He raced off scratch and finished in a time of 32:52. It was commented that he "shows to great advantage in the shorter races, with McKee stronger on distance. They are, however, a good team, each getting full value from the other". On 12 August he came 3rd in the junior Tapakuna race over 15 miles but finished with the fastest time of 43:18. The following Saturday, Jones finished 3rd in the first of two senior races but registered the fastest time once more at 32:43 over their 11.5 mile course which was his fifth consecutive fastest time.

On 26 August the Takapuna club held a combined race of 26 miles via Albany and the lake for the Farmers Cup. Jones was racing off a 2:30 handicap. In early September, Jones competed in a 22-mile race at Takapuna before winning the junior race on 16 September in a walkover with no other junior riders competing. The Auckland Star wrote "in the junior championship race Ross Jones, the junior scratch man, had an easy victory, if a somewhat hollow one. Ross was, and is, undoubtedly the junior champion, and apparently his co-riders thought so, as not one started against him. This youngster has collected "time" for the greater part of the season, and is a fine type of rider. A six footer of husky build, his weight and stamina alone would make him a fairly tough opponent".

Jones penultimate race of the season was a 30-mile lake circuit race on 30 September. His final race was in the 18.5 mile race for the Onslow Wood Memorial Shield on 14 October. He had a 1:15 handicap but did not place. In November the club held their second annual meeting where they awarded the junior championship to Jones.

==== 1934 Takapuna and Auckland Junior Champion ====
The 1934 season began in February but the first mention of Jones was him getting a 2-minute handicap for their 3 March race over 18.5 miles on their Takapuna course. He rode the first lap in 9:58 and then decided to pull out. Jones rode again in the 22.5 mile race on 24 March but did not place before competing in the Takapuna club race over a Kauri Gully-Birkenhead road circuit. He finished second behind G. Lawrence but had the fastest time in 51:07:12. Jones, who had only recently turned 16 was competing against senior club riders. He was said to have "started out after the limit man right away, and rode strongly, to soon find himself in the position he coveted – the leading bunch – with G. Lawrence and P. Bowden. Coming into the straight on the last lap Jones looked a certainty, but G. Lawrence challenged strongly in the sprint, and with a bare half length to spare, gained the decision. The showing made by Jones in this event is the more creditable, in that he is still a junior, and although hardly in form yet, he apparently intends to make the seniors look to their laurels this season". He had a 2-minute handicap a week later over 22.5 miles but failed to finish. The Auckland Star said he and L. Dick "proved disappointing, both being dropped easily when the pace cracked on, and eventually" they withdrew. On 21 April Jones raced in the 22.5 mile lake circuit for the King Cup. He had a handicap of 2:30 and finished second in a time of 64:18.5. He then failed to place in the 23 mile race to Albany and back on 5 May, and on 12 May in a 30-mile lake circuit race he had to retire on the first lap with a puncture with the course said to be in "poor condition" in parts.

On 19 May Jones finished in the second group in sixth place in a 22.25 mile lake circuit and was said to have done "his best work in this race". The Takapuna club's next race was in the hillier Birkenhead suburb which was more challenging than their almost flat Takapuna lake circuit. It was over 17 miles but Jones had to pull out when he punctured. He had been riding "exceptionally well", and was said to have "had a run of bad luck since purchasing his new machine".

The Auckland Amateur Cycling Centre held the first of its open junior races on 2 June. The course was from Carrington Road in Point Chevalier to Henderson and back where the concrete ended. Jones was one of three riders riding off scratch. Jones finished outside the places but had the second fastest time out of 32 riders behind Charles T. Dwight who had a time of 45:22. Jones only just lost out to Dwight in a tight spring finish in overcast conditions with light showers falling. It was said that he "was unlucky to be defeated for time by such an extremely narrow margin", and that he "is not in form yet, but soon will be, and should be in the limelight in the near future". Then in an invitational race at Takapuna with Lynndale club riders, Jones posted the fastest time over 7.5 miles. The field numbered 17 with Jones’ time being 20:29, which was 23 seconds faster than H.W. Robertson. Despite this he finished outside the top 4 due to the handicaps granted to those riders. On 16 June Takapuna held an invitational event on their course with the Beach Haven Club. Jones was racing off scratch in the junior race of 7.5 miles but also raced in the senior race of 26 miles off a 2-minute handicap. He came second in the senior race, finishing just "half a wheel" behind G. Williams who was timed at 70:09. Jones finishing a mere fifth of a second further back. The following week on 23 June Jones was unfortunate in the 26 mile seated handicap and time race on the East Coast roads of the North Shore. He was "making great time" when his "chain and sprocket" broke. Despite this Jones was selected by the club to represent them in the upcoming Auckland Junior Championship race which would follow the Takapuna clubs 26 mile handicap race for the Hawes Cup. He raced off scratch in the junior race from Carrington Road to Te Atatū corner and back but failed to place. On 14 July he rode off scratch at the Lynndale club invitation race over 6.25 miles. He broke the junior lap record in the two lap race but finished two minutes behind the lead owing to a crash.

Jones next competed in the Auckland Amateur Cycling Centre's junior championship race on 21 July. The race was over 13.2 miles from Carrington Road in Point Chevalier to Te Atatū where the riders would turn back. There were 18 competitors with each rider starting at two minute intervals. At the halfway point Jones (Takapuna Club) had posted the leading time of 20:40, two seconds ahead of Charles T. Dwight (Manukau Club). The "riders had to face a stiff head wind and accompanying showers". With the wind at their back they posted faster return times and Jones became the champion, posting a finishing time of 37:43, a full 25 seconds ahead of Dwight, and 50 seconds ahead of Ernie Tucker (Auckland Club) in third. A month later at the Auckland Cycling Centre's meeting it was decided "to award a championship sash to Ross Jones, who won the junior unpaced championship on July 21 last". The Auckland Star referred to Jones following his win as the "auburn-haired Takapuna ankler", and in other comments said that he "has long been regarded by the Shore club as undoubtedly the most brilliant junior in the Auckland province, and his victory proved no surprise here, as barring accidents it was practically a foregone conclusion. Ross has set his mark now in the open classes, and there is nothing to prevent him going right to the top. This rider has a number of placings to his credit already…". While the New Zealand Herald wrote "the scratch junior of the Takapuna Club, R. Jones, rode brilliantly to win the junior road championship… along the northern concrete highway…". After being two seconds up at half way "on the wind-assisted return Jones was outstanding and eventually completed the distance, under unpaced conditions, in a time of 37m 43s – a course record".

His next race was on 28 July in the club's third annual event for the Farmers Cup over a 26-mile course to Albany and back with one lap of Lake Pupuke. He had a 1:30 handicap and "the 16 year old six foot junior champion" was second fastest in a time of 80:56. Then on 11 August Jones posted the fastest time in the 16 mile race over the Birkenhead course with 50:21.12 however he finished outside the places. He rode "a brilliant race" and "this youngster is chasing the senior scratch mark, and leaves no doubt as to his chances of getting there. Every event finds Ross more improved".

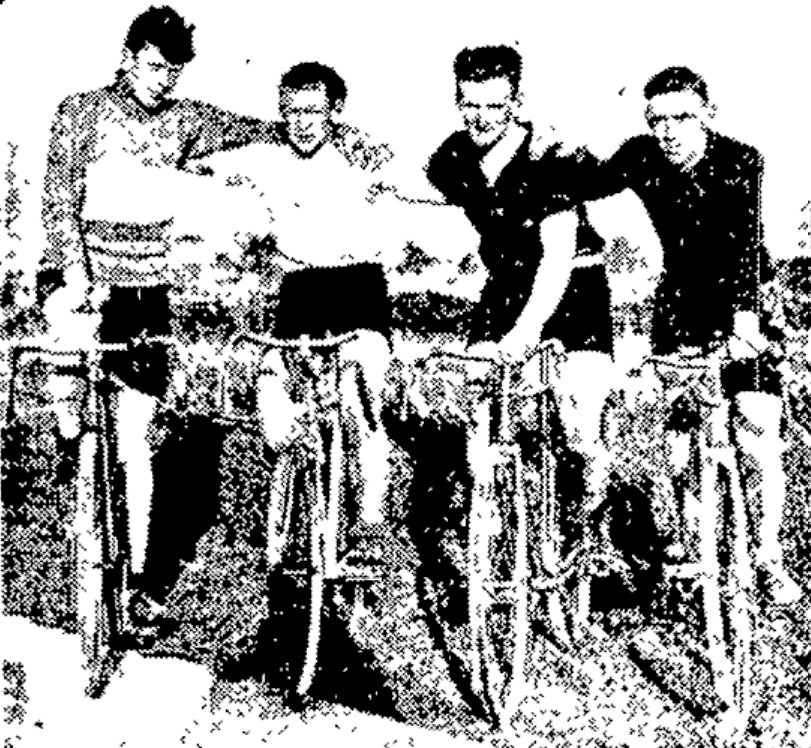
Ross Jones (left) after the 22-mile race for the Rainger Cup. From right: D. Keating (winner), O. Durbin (second), L. Denning (third), and Jones (fastest time).

On 18 August he did in fact race off scratch in the Takapuna clubs 22.5 mile race for the Rainger Cup. Once more Jones didn't place but recorded the fastest time with 60:25. The Herald wrote "for a junior R. Jones, of the Takapuna Club, is a remarkable rider. Riding from scratch, he recorded the fast figures of 60m 25s for the 22.5 miles event. An average of practically 22 miles an hour is an achievement of which many a senior rider would take pride in attaining". A piece on cycling in the Dominion newspaper said "for years Aucklanders have been renowned for their pedalling prowess, and a new star has appeared in the person of Ross Jones, a member of the Takapuna club. Northerners are enthusiastic regarding this promising lad's future prospects, as he only commenced racing late last season, and while still a junior has won several senior events besides registering fastest time on more than one occasion. Jones, whose age is 16, is a fine-built lad, being 6ft 2in, and weighing 14st 5lb. He is the new Auckland provincial champion. With Johnnie Brown, the Manukau club crack, Jones is at present the outstanding performer in the Queen City". On 22 August the Auckland Star published a photograph of Jones with D. Keating, O. Durbin, and L. Denning after they had finished the Rainger Cup race.

On 25 August racing off scratch Jones was beaten by G. Williams in a "keen tussle for the fastest time honours in their club’s 26 mile" lake circuit course. Then on Wednesday, 29 August Jones traveled to Taranaki to compete in the North Island championship road race over 60 miles. The course went from Hawera to Eltham, Kaponga, Opunake, Manaia, and back to Hawera on tar-sealed roads. He was one of three Auckland riders. Jones started with a 15.5 minute handicap in the 12th group of 60 riders with 28 starting before them. Going through Eltham Jones was placed 23rd in 1hr 49m. By Kaponga he had moved up to 19th but dropped back to 22nd when they passed Awatuna and was in the 4th group on the course, around 6 minutes behind the leaders. However he pushed on well and when they arrived at Manaia he had moved up to 10th and was in a group of 11 who were 4 minutes back from Ludlam and Dombroski. Over the remaining sections of the course which included the difficult Tokaora Hill and he dropped out of the top 20 by the finish at the Hawera Showgrounds.

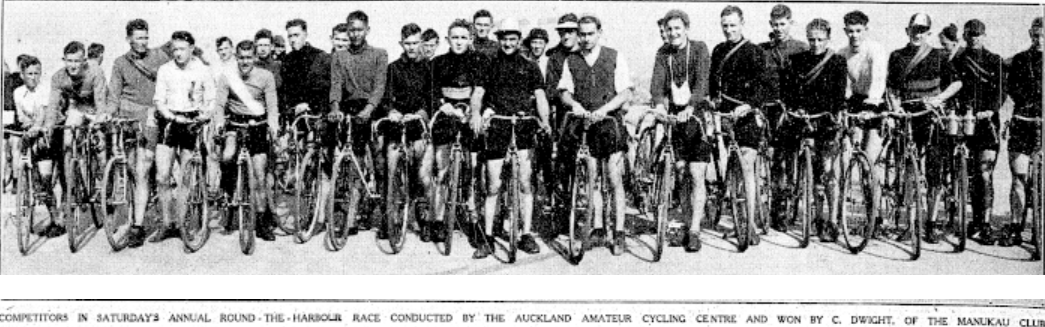
Cyclists in the field before the 1934 annual AACC race around the harbour which Jones competed in.

On 1 September the Auckland Amateur Cycle Club held their annual race around the harbour. It went from Devonport via Albany and Riverhead to Carrington Road in Point Chevalier. Over 100 riders were entered in the 44 mile race for the Malvern Star Cup with Jones receiving a 9-minute handicap. Being just three days after the North Island championships he unsurprisingly did not place. A week later on 8 September he competed for the Leader Cup off scratch on the Takapuna Course in a 30-mile race but does not appear to have placed. He was again racing off scratch on 15 September in the junior championship race which was to Albany and back over 23 miles. "Amidst tremendous excitement Ross Jones won time honours from L. Denning by 1 second" in a time of 90:44. Though Denning had a two-minute time advantage so was the actual 'first place' getter. The win meant that Jones was the Takapuna Junior Champion for 1934.

A week later he competed in the 24 mile Takapuna Annual Senior Championship race. It was an unpaced race and Jones won once more with a time of 66:20 over a course which covered the East Coast roads to Deep Creek, on to Albany, and back to Takapuna through Kauri Gully. The Auckland Star said "this has been a remarkable season for him… this makes his third win this season, he having already won the Auckland provincial championship and his own club's junior championship, and finished off on Saturday with the club's senior honours". He also broke the course record beating the time of B. Sharp by 2:17 after Jones was "responsible for some brilliant unpaced work, and after a gruelling ride finished with a very fair sprint to gain second placing in the sealed handicap, from scratch". The New Zealand Herald wrote "R. Jones, junior member of the Takapuna Club, has had a wonderful season… [the race] was decided under the strenuous unpaced system in which each competitor has to ride the distance alone…".

His season began to draw to a close with three more races. The first was the Beach Haven Club 20 mile race around Birkdale. The course was much more arduous than the Takapuna course and Jones "did not show up in this race, and to all appearances would benefit from a spell". On 13 October in the Takapuna 22.5 mile race he "rode easily and withdrew after the 5th lap". He had "been advised to retire from racing for six months, but is finishing out the season". His final race came on 20 October in the Onslow Wood Memorial Shield race over 18.5 miles. Racing off scratch he didn't place and most likely rode easily again.

Two weeks later on 5 November at 12:15am Jones was involved in a fatal car accident. He was a passenger in the vehicle which was returning from a dance in Albany to Devonport. The deceased was Michael Stipich, aged 19 of Devonport who was killed instantly. Jones was injured along with Richard Powell (19), Noel Langton (25), John Cogan (20), and James McGregor (18). They were all reported to be suffering from concussion and were all "in a serious condition". The vehicle had hit the left hand railing of a bridge and "plunged 30ft. into the creek below, known as Sand's Creek". The coroner ruled that there had been no alcohol involved and that the collapse of the left front wheel was most likely responsible for the vehicle leaving the road.

==== 1935 Cycling season (Takapuna and Auckland Cycle Clubs) ====
The 1935 season opened on 2 March with an 11.5 mile race on the Takapuna lake circuit with Jones riding off scratch. He was said to be "somewhat disappointing" and was not doing his best. A week later over the same course he finished 6th in 32:54 and was again said to have not given much effort. He raced over 14.5 miles on 16 March off scratch and didn't place, then again over 13.5 miles with a lap of Lake Pupuke and then on to the Birkenhead circuit. Jones punctured on Northcote Road and did not finish the race. With a 45-second handicap in their 18-mile race Jones finished 3rd out of 16. He was said to be "steadily regaining form" and "produced a sprint which brought to mind his last year's brilliant performances, and enabled him to outstay the scratch men and gain third placing in 52:39, by half a length". The Herald wrote that "he gave every indication of having made a complete recovery from his motoring accident a few months ago when he out sprinted five others to finish third. He along with V.S. Blomfield, had 45s start, and on the initial lap left Blomfield to make the fastest lap of the afternoon in 10m 5s. Blomfield, however, caught him on the next round, and from then on the pair paced out a great race". In a 17-mile Takapuna race which featured two laps of the lake and then to Birkenhead, Jones was forced to pull out when "he collapsed with cramp" after riding strongly in the leading bunch. He had a 45-second handicap in a 22.5 mile race on the lake circuit but did not place on 27 April.

Jones then competed in the Auckland Amateur Cycling Centre's opening race of the season on 4 May. The race was from Point Chevalier to Swanson and back over 23 miles. He had a 3-minute handicap but his finishing time and position is unknown. A week later Jones rode a 22.25 mile Takapuna lake circuit in 60:45. He and S. Laurence were "very fit [and] teamed well together, but had no chance of overhauling the field after it had closed up". On 18 May Jones came 4th in the clubs race for the Farmers Cup over 26 miles. He was racing off scratch and had a time of 78m 52.12s, two seconds behind the winner (R. Eagles). The race included a lap of the lake and to Albany and back.

The Takapuna club held their annual open race on 3 June. It was a 52.5 mile event starting at Devonport before travelling through Birkenhead, Albany, Silverdale, Orewa, and then returning to Takapuna. Jones had a 12-minute handicap in the largest field to start a local event with 118 riders entered. Unfortunately he had to retire due to mechanical failure along with two of his club mates after they were "going strongly". His next race was the following Saturday on 8 June in a 22.5 mile race off scratch. He raced in two more local events on 15 June and 22 June but his placings were unknown. In mid June he was selected by the Takapuna club to compete in the Auckland Cycling Centre's junior championship race in July.

===== Move to Auckland Cycle Club =====
In late July, Jones transferred to the Auckland Cycle Club which was based in the suburb of Panmure. It was not stated why he moved but after moving there he exclusively rode in the junior grade rather than the senior grade as he had been doing much of the time at Takapuna. The Auckland club had many more junior riders than Takapuna. On 27 July Jones finished 6th in a time of 28:35 over the 10 mile course on sealed roads in Panmure in showery weather. On 17 August he rode in their 13.5 mile race off scratch along with three other riders in a junior field of 24. Jones was again riding off scratch in a 6.5 mile race on 24 August and did not place. Races followed over distances of 6.5 miles (31 August), 13.5 miles (7 September), 10 miles (14 September), and 6.5 miles (28 September) in Panmure. In each case he was again riding off scratch indicating that he was recording times among the fastest in the field but he was not placing. Only he, B. Harvey, and G. Leonard were riding off scratch each week.

On 5 October Jones competed in the clubs 25 mile annual Junior Championship race. Only he and Harvey were riding off scratch. Jones did not place in the top three and neither he nor Harvey recorded the fastest time which was set by D. Banks in 76:26. On 12 October Jones again raced at Panmure at an Auckland Cycle Club event and was off scratch with B. Harvey. This time the race length was 10 miles. His last road race of the season was on 25 October in the Auckland Cycle Club's last race at Panmure. It was a combined senior and junior event with Jones having a 4-minute 40 second handicap over the 25 mile course.

==== Track racing (Western Springs and Papatoetoe) ====
Starting in November, Jones began track racing at the Western Springs cinder track as part of the Auckland Cycle Club's track season. All of his track races were in the junior competitions. The meetings were held at 6pm on Wednesdays. He raced in a one-mile event on 20 November off scratch. None of the results of any of the meetings here or at Papatoetoe Stadium were reported in the newspapers despite weekly information being published about race details, riders and handicapping. He raced there again the following week on 27 November. On 4 December he raced at Papatoetoe Stadium in a one-mile race off scratch. The races there were still put on by the Auckland Cycle Club. Jones then competed in two Saturday races at the same venue over half a mile and one and a half miles. He rode both off scratch indicating that he was doing well at the events as the majority of the riders had handicaps ranging from 40 yards to 260 yards over the longer of the two races. His last two meetings of the year were on 12 December and 19 December, both Thursday evenings at the Papatoetoe Stadium. On 12 December he competed in two races and was off scratch in both. The 19 December meeting saw him in a one-mile race off scratch.

=== Rugby Union ===
==== Matakana Rugby Club & Rodney (1936) ====
On 16 February Jones was involved in another fatal road accident. He was a passenger in a vehicle which "left the main road between Waiwera and Puhoi and crashed 160ft down a steep bank, finally coming to rest in its right side". The victim was Mr. Arthur Trevor Day, aged 22 of Matakana. Jones received "slight facial and ankle injuries and shock". The vehicle, driven by J.R. Rawlings touched the side of an approaching car a mile past Waiwera causing it to go out of control and plunge over the bank down the hillside. Day was found 50 ft from the vehicle and was dead at the scene while Rawlings was also found 50 ft from the vehicle with a fractured leg. Ronald Cogan was found next to the car with internal injuries while Jones managed to climb back to the roadway and stop a passing car. He was said to have been "too dazed to remember how far he had accompanied the car down the incline". The two injured passengers were taken to Auckland Hospital by St. John Ambulance while "Jones was able to go to relatives at Matakana". The following year Jones posted an In Memoriam notice in the New Zealand Herald stating "Day, – In memory of Trevor, accidentally killed, February 15, 1936. Ever remembered. – Inserted by Ross Jones".

Three months later on 16 April the Matakana Football Club held their annual meeting with sixteen in attendance. They then held their first practise on 18 April. The competition began on 2 May but Matakana had a bye, with their first game against Port Albert on 9 May. Matakana lost 18–3. There was relatively little newspaper coverage of the games aside from the weekly draws and scores so it is unconfirmed if Jones began with the side from their very first games of the season. However he was chosen in the Rodney trial match in mid June so it is likely that he played in most if not all of them. Matakana lost their next match to Wellsford 14–3 on 16 May. A third loss followed to Puhoi 12–8 on 23 May.

The first specific mention of Jones came following Matakana's 15–5 win over Kaitoa on 30 May. Kaitoa were a rural club representing the Kaipara Flats and Tauhoa areas. He scored two of their five tries at Matakana Domain. A week later on 6 June Matakana won again, beating Pākiri 9–6 at Matakana Domain. The sole Rodney representative selector, R. Becroft was in attendance and would have seen Jones "using his weight and height" to "put Matakana on the scoring card with a try from close to the line". Matakana lost to Warkworth 18–3 on 13 June and then had a bye the following weekend.

Jones was then named in the Rodney Rugby Union's junior representative side to play a team from the Kaipara Union at Wellsford midweek on 23 June. However he did not play in the junior representative game, instead he played in the senior Rodney team trial match the same day at Warkworth. Jones was chosen in a side made up of players from the Kaitoa, Port Albert, Pakiri, and Matakana clubs. Their opponents were chosen from the Puhoi, Warkworth, and Wellsford clubs. Jones' side won 23 to 8 with Jones scoring three of their five tries. The following Saturday he scored another try in their 9–3 loss to Port Albert. His try came after he "took a good pass from B. Sharp near the line". A week later Matakana lost to Wellsford 18–6. Following that round of matches Jones was named in the forwards for the Rodney representative side to play Northern Wairoa for the Harding Shield on 18 July. The side was told to assemble at Gubbs' Motors, Warkworth on the morning of the match. On the same evening as Matakana's game, Jones was runner up along with Mrs Donald Jones (his mother Ida) in a card evening at the Matakana Hall, to raise money for the Church of England. The next weekend Matakana lost 19–11 to Puhoi.

In early July the final team was named for the Rodney representative match with Jones named to play. The game was played at Rugby Park in Dargaville. Jones played in the second row with Rodney losing 6 to 3 after playing with the wind and driving rain at their back in the second half.

Matakana defeated Kaitoa 13–8 on 25 July, before an 8–3 loss to Pakiri a week later. The knockout competition began on 8 August with Matakana upsetting Warkworth 17–6. They then beat Kaitoa in the next round 17–3 on 15 August at the Matakana Domain. In the knockout final for the Farmers Trading Coy.'s Cup, Matakana met Puhoi who had earlier won the championship. Puhoi won the game 8–6 and then went on to also win the E.L. Smith Cup when they beat championship runners up Port Albert. To conclude the 'rugby' season the Matakana side played the Matakana hockey side in a game which saw the teams play a half of hockey followed by a half of rugby on 12 September. The Rodney and Otamatea Times newspaper wrote "one particularly fine effort by Jones from the footballers 25 sailed without obstruction clean into their opponents goal. Evidently some flagrant breach of the rules of the game was mixed up in this movement as the score was disallowed by the referees". Later on however he was successful when he "struggled valiantly to score". The hockey side led 12–3 at halftime with goals counting for three points each. In the second half he scored a try with the rugby team winning 27–12 on aggregate.

==== Matakana Rugby Club & Rodney (1937) ====
The 1937 season saw Jones' father, Donald McLean Jones chosen as the senior selector for the Matakana Football Club. Ross had recently turned 19 years of age. They opened the season with a 21–8 loss to Port Albert on 24 April. There was relatively little coverage of the competition in the local Rodney and Otamatea Times, Waitemata and Kaipara Gazette to start the season so it can only be assumed that Jones played in their first two matches. The second was a 3–0 win over Wellsford. Matakana's team to play Warkworth on 8 May was named prior to the match with Jones named in the forwards. Matakana won 18–9 with Jones scoring a try with their "heavier pack" helping give them the win. He was then named once more in the side to play Puhoi a week later on 15 May. They won again, 12–0 before having a bye. Once more Jones was named to play in their match with Port Albert on 29 May, with Matakana losing 17–0. They then lost to Wellsford 17–13 on 5 June with Jones having been named to play on the wing. Jones played in the forwards again in their 12 June loss to Wellsford by 17 points to 13. The same evening the Matakana club held one of their regular card and dance events with "Mr Ross Jones … an efficient master of ceremonies on the dance floor, and Cox’s Melody Boys providing the music". Jones was named to play against Puhoi on 19 June. Matakana won 14–0. In the last round of the championship Matakana had a bye and Port Albert won the competition for 1937.

With the championship concluded the Rodney selector, Mr. E. Roy Becroft chose Jones in the forwards for their match against Otamatea on 3 July. Rodney were disappointing and lost 16 points to 0. Jones then returned to his Matakana side and played in their 16–14 win over Wellsford in the first round of the Farmers' Trading Company's competition. Jones was in the Matakana side which then won in round two over Warkworth 5 points to 0 on 31 July. He also played in their 6–3 win against Port Albert on 7 August. Following the game Jones was named in the Rodney side to play Whangarei on 14 August for the Harding Shield. However a day before the game which was to be played at Kensington Park in Whangārei, the Rodney Union notified Whangārei that they would be unable to get a team together to make the trip and they defaulted the match. Jones' final game of the season was for Matakana in an E.L. Smith Challenge Cup game against holders Port Albert at the Port Albert Domain on 28 August. Port Albert won 9 to 6 with Jones scoring one of Matakana's two tries. At the conclusion of the sporting season the Ōmaha hockey boys team held a dance at the Whangateau Hall on 11 September. It was reported that "a novelty dance was won by Miss Eileen Meiklejohn and Mr Ross Jones".

=== Cricket ===
==== Matakana Cricket Club (1936/37) ====
With the rugby season finished Jones joined the Matakana Cricket Club which played in the Rodney Cricket Association. On 7 November against Omaha he scored 7 and 16 not out and took 4 wickets for 29 runs. Three of his wickets were bowled, with the other caught and bowled. His next known appearance was on 23 January when he scored 25 runs opening the batting against Omaha at their oppositions ground. He was playing with an S. Jones and an M. Jones, who was possibly his older brother Murray.

==== Matakana Cricket Club (1937/38) ====
The following season (1937/38) Jones scored 30 runs in their season opening game against Omaha. Jones scored 22 runs in Matakana's first innings of 189 against Tauhoa at Matakana on 6 November. In a win over Glorit on 20 November, Jones scored 12 runs in their second innings and took two wickets for eight runs. On 4 December he scored 14 runs against Whangaripo in a loss. Then on 11 December Jones scored 23 runs in a draw against Kaipara Flats.

Jones was named in the junior match for the Wyatt Cup to be played on Wednesday, 15 December. He was in the Rodney East team to play Rodney West at the Port Albert Domain. His side lost the game and he was not mentioned for any individual feats however afterwards he was named in the Rodney Colts side to play at Omaha the following Wednesday on 22 December. Before then he played for Matakana on 18 December and took 5 wickets for 11 runs in a win over Power Board. There was no mention of the results of the colts match in any of the newspapers. On 8 January Jones took 2 for 25 and 1 for 6 in a win against Wharehine.

Jones then struck good form with the bat when he scored 58 not out and 21 not out in a first innings win against Mullet Point on 15 January. This was followed by 62 runs against Omaha a week later on 22 January. With the match signalling the conclusion of the championship, Matakana finished in fifth place from ten teams.

Jones was selected to play in the Rodney A representative side in a 12 February match against Northern Wairoa at Omaha however the match was postponed and not played until 25 February. The postponement came after torrential rain in the region cut off many settlements. In Matakana's game with Mullet Point on 19 March Jones scored possibly his highest score to that point when he made 93 out of their 184 total. He then took a wicket for 3 runs. Then after a 26 March game with Whangaripo, Jones was selected in the Rodney A team to play Eden (Auckland) at Easter on 2 and 4 April. Eden were the Auckland champions with both games to be played at Omaha. Rodney beat the Auckland champions on the first innings though Jones did not feature in the scoring or wickets. The Monday match was won narrowly by Eden with Jones not featuring again. There was no mention of Jones in connection with cricket for Matakana beyond this point which was most likely the conclusion of the season.

==== Matakana Cricket Club (1938/39) ====
Jones rejoined the Matakana cricket side following the conclusion of the rugby league season in Auckland where he had been playing for North Shore. In October he played for Rodney B on Labour Day but then was not mentioned again until mid January when he scored 10 runs for Matakana in a match with Kaipara Flats on 21 January. There was no mention of him in the Matakana side again this season and he was soon back playing rugby league for North Shore in mid April.

=== Rugby League ===
==== North Shore Albions (1938) ====
On 1 April the Matakana Football Club held their annual meeting with Jones's father still the club patron and selector of the senior side. However Ross obviously moved south to Auckland around this time and joined the North Shore Albions rugby league club which was based in Devonport, the same suburb he had lived in for most of his youth. It is likely that he knew many of the senior players in the club as they were typically drawn from the surrounding area. The first mention of him in connection with the North Shore side was on 27 May when he was named in the forwards in their reserve grade side to play Ponsonby United at the Devonport Domain which was their home ground. North shore lost the match 10–5.

Jones made his first team debut aged 20 on 4 June in North Shore's round 8 match with Newton Rangers. He had been named in the second row in their side published in the Auckland Star a day earlier. The match was played on the main field at Carlaw Park, the home of Auckland Rugby League at 1:30 pm. Newton won the match but impressively in his first game of 1st grade rugby league, Jones was said to be "the best of the forwards" for the North Shore side which included the experienced Horace Hunt, Hugh Simpson, and Arthur Sowter. North Shore had a bye the following weekend before meeting Marist Old Boys [Saints] in round 10 on 18 June. North Shore lost heavily 26–4. In the forwards it was reported that "Sowter was the best, although Condon, Jones and Simpson played well in the loose". Jones' old schoolmate Verdun Scott kicked two penalties for North Shore. Jones scored his first points in a 37–7 win against Manukau in round 11 on Carlaw Park #2. He scored two tries and "played well" amongst the forwards who "played with great dash".

Jones was named in the North Shore second row again for their round 12 match with Mount Albert United. Mount Albert won the 3pm match at Carlaw Park by 9 points to 3. In the first half Ted Scott, the North Shore halfback made a long run from a scrum "but he hung on too long, when a pass either side to Hunt or Jones would have resulted in a certain try". The New Zealand Herald went on to say that "Jones and Barnett played good games" for North Shore. Jones scored a try in an 18–5 loss to Richmond Rovers on 9 July. His second half try was described as "spectacular" but no further specifics were offered by the New Zealand Herald. Jones was among the "pick of the forwards" for his side along with McIntosh and Simpson. While the Auckland Star wrote that "McIntosh and Jones showed up all the way in the Shore six". The following week Jones had to play in the backs in their 7–5 loss to Ponsonby United. The Herald reported that "Jones, usually a forward, played a good game at centre-three quarter". While the Star newspaper said that "Jones showed his ability as a utility player by assisting the backs for the occasion…". He was able to move back into the forwards for their game with Papakura in round 15. North Shore won 13–5 on the Carlaw Park #2 field in the early kickoff game. In the first half Arthur Sowter and Jones "led North Shore to Papakura’s twenty five in a loose rush. The ball went to [Trevor] Hammill, on the left wing, who ran strongly till tackled in the corner. However, he in-passed cleverly to Len Scott, who scored". Then soon after Jones "participated in a passing bout" with Zane-Zaninovich and Hammill for the later to score. The Herald said "Sowter, Jones, Hunt and Barnett were a hard-working quartet, the first two being particularly prominent in the loose".

North Shore's next game was with City Rovers in round 16 with the championship entering its later stages. The two sides were near the bottom of the table. North Shore won 21–18 with Jones scoring two of their five tries while playing in the second row. He scored the second try of the game after City had been ahead 5–0, and then his second try came late in the match to give North Shore a 21–15 lead. The Herald described his first try saying that Hugh Simpson "headed a good forward rush and passed to Jones, who appeared to knock the ball on, but was awarded a try". Jones then "headed a strong North Shore forward rush, and Hunt kicked over the City line and Simpson scored". His second try came when Ivor Stirling and Ted Scott "paved the way for Jones to score an easy try". After the game the Herald said that "Jones was easily the best of the forwards, and his fast following up frequently stopped many promising City attacks". In North Shore's final game of the championship they lost to Newton 13–10 on 13 August with Jones again in the second row. He, Simpson, and Barnett "were the pick of the forwards" for his side.

With the championship in its last round, North Shore had a bye and finished 7th of nine teams. They traveled to Whangārei to play at Jubilee Park against a combined Whangārei side. Jones played in his usual position of the second row and was heavily involved, scoring two (possibly three) of their seven tries in a 33–0 win and being involved in several others. His first try came with the score 2–0 when Verdun Scott "came through from the full-back position and kicked through for R. Jones to follow up and score" with New Zealand international Jack Smith converting. Later in the half The Northern Advocate wrote "Ross Jones was lucky with a speculator and Sterling gathered in to send on to E. Scott, who touched down under the posts for what appeared a doubtful try". Then Vincent Axman "sent the backs away in a sortie from which Jones scored wide out". Both tries were converted by Smith. [Ted] Scott "broke through, to send Jones sprinting down the line, but Sowter was waiting offside for a pass". With the game nearly at its conclusion Shore attacked again and "Smith sent Jones over". The Northern Advocate credited Jones with two tries and Simpson as being one of their other try scorers but their match description had Jones as scoring three and no mention of Simpson scoring. North Shore then travelled south to Prince Edward Park in Papakura where they played Papakura in a friendly match on 27 August. North Shore won 5–3 though there was little coverage of the match.

North Shore began the Roope Rooster knockout competition in round 2 on 3 September against Marist at Carlaw Park. Jones in his customary position scored one of their two tries in an 8–2 win. His try came early when Bill Glover lost the ball over his own try line and "Jones dived on it". The Herald reported said that "Jones was perhaps the best and was always prominent in the loose with fast following up". While the Auckland Star said "all the Shore forwards revelled in the heavy going with a great three in Sowter, Jones and McIntosh". Jones' rugby league season came to an end a week later on 10 September when they lost their Roope Rooster semi final with Richmond, 20–7. Among the forwards Jones, Simpson and Barnett "played well". North Shore played one more match in the consolation Phelan Shield competition against Papakura on 17 September but Jones was not listed in their side. It is possible that he had moved back to Matakana as he was chosen to play in the Rodney B cricket team in their October Labour Day match.

==== North Shore (1939) ====
The 1939 rugby league season began for Jones on 15 April. North Shore had a bye on 1 April and there were no games on 8 April. As in his debut season he was named in his regular position of the second row. North Shore won 26–8 over Ponsonby on the Carlaw Park #2 field. He played again in North Shore's 7–0 win over Richmond on 22 April. It was said that "North Shore has a young set of forwards who will improve with experience. They showed plenty of dash, and good games were played by [Edgar] Morgan, Jones and E. [Ted] Scott". The Auckland Star wrote that "Jones and McKintosh stood out in the Shore forwards". In round 4 North Shore lost to Manukau 23–7 with "Condon, H. Zane [Harry Zane-Zaninovich], and Jones the most prominent" of the North Shore forwards who were "outweighted" [sic] by their much bigger forward opponents which included Jack Brodrick, Pita Ririnui, Angus Gault, Jack McLeod, Freddie McGuire, and J. Marsh. The Auckland Star praised Jones by saying "there may be bigger forwards in Auckland with bigger reputations than Jones, but there is no league forward at the moment playing better football".

The following week he played well in a 16–7 loss to Marist on Carlaw Park #2. He was described as being one of the North Shore forwards "who were constantly on the ball". In the first half when they were attacking "the bounce beat Jones… and [Bill] Glover was lucky to kick the ball into touch". The Herald said that "Jones was the best forward on the ground". Against Newton on 13 May Jones scored his first try of the season in a 19–12 loss. The match was played at North Shore's home ground of Devonport Domain. Once again Jones was said to have been "the best forward on the field". His try was described "as the outcome of the hard bustling tactics that characterised North Shore’s game in the first half". In round 7 Jones was not named in either the first grade side or the reserve grade side. However, when Edgar Morgan came off injured late in the first half Jones went on to replace him. He was "prominent" in the forwards after coming on. The Star wrote that Jones "is one of the best raiding forwards in Auckland". On 24 May the New Zealand Herald wrote a piece on the form players in Auckland to this point in the season with a view to possible trialists for the New Zealand side to tour England and France. Jones was included in a list of seventeen forwards who had "shown consistent form this season".

Against Papakura in round 8, Jones scored a try in a 21–0 win. He was "among the forwards who shone for North Shore" along with Ted Scott and Thomas Field. While the Auckland Star said "Jones and Hapeta were prominent for good play". He was then named as one of the two forward reserves for Auckland Pākehā for their game with Auckland Māori on 5 June at Carlaw Park. However he was not required to play in the match. Two days prior on 3 June he played a good game in a 26–16 win over City on Carlaw Park #2.

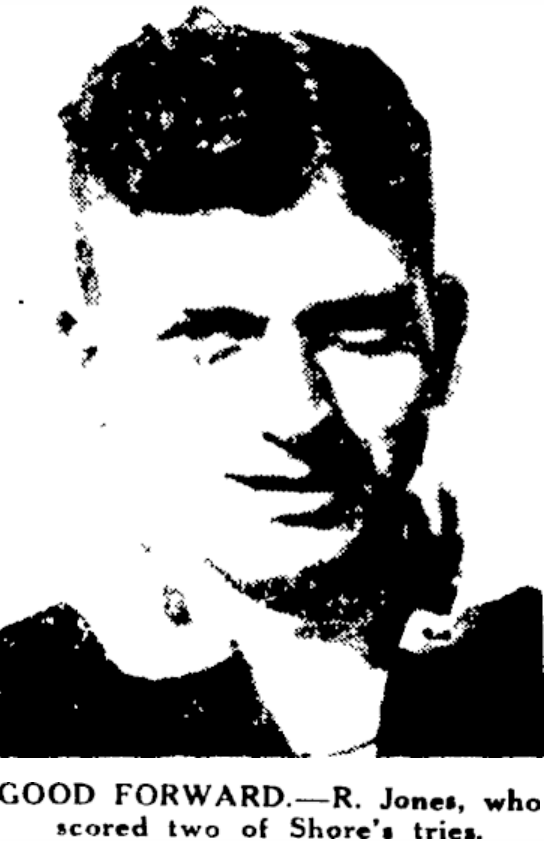

His good form continued in round 11 where he scored two of North Shore's four tries in a 16–8 win against Ponsonby. He had been consistently playing in the second row all season. Comments on the match in the Auckland Star were under a heading titled "Two Tries To Jones" which stated "there has been a recent realisation that North Shore has a great forward in Jones, and in the match he got two tries and lost another when the referee ruled an infringement after the Shore forward had got over the Ponsonby line. Young tall, immensely powerful and 15 stone in weight, Jones appears to be the best forward find that Auckland has made in recent years, and he should have a good chance of inclusion in the New Zealand team to tour Britain". The Herald said "Jones was in fine form among the North Shore forwards and his keen sense of anticipation resulted in his scoring spectacular tries". And that "a feature of the game was the splendid display of Jones, the tall North Shore forward. He was outstanding in the loose and showed a remarkable sense of anticipation in supporting attacks. Possessed of plenty of speed and a good handler, Jones must be seriously considered as one of the second row forwards likely to get a trial for the New Zealand selection". The following week in a 9–8 win over Richmond "Jones did much good work, although he did not show up quite as prominently as in some of the previous matches". He "stood out prominently in the loose and was a thorn in the side of the Richmond backs". Jones scored another try in North Shore's seventh straight win, this time over Manukau 19–5 in the main match at Carlaw Park on 1 July. He "was outstanding but he had great support" from his fellow forwards. Near half-time "Jones, supported by Field, took the ball through at toe for the latter to score". Which with the conversion gave them a 7–2 lead. Part way through the second half "Jones followed a clever centre-kick by Chatham to take the ball right through at his toe for a well-deserved try". Then "Jones again went through in a dribbling rush and E. [Ted] Scott fell on the ball for a try". Overall he was said to have been "very prominent, particularly in the second half".

=== New Zealand Trials and selection (1939) ===
==== Trials (1939) ====
Following the 1 July matches in the Fox Memorial championship, Jones was named in the New Zealand Possibles side to play the Probables as curtain-raiser to the inter-island match between North Island and South Island. The matches were to be played at Carlaw Park. He was paired in the second row with George Mitchell (Richmond). Their second row opponents were Clarrie Peterson (Ponsonby) and R. Barnard (Canterbury) while Pita Ririnui (Manukau) and Harold Milliken (Papakura) had been picked in the second row for the North Island side. The Possibles side lost 31–17 and there was little mention of Jones in the match report in the New Zealand Herald aside from saying that he "was inclined to get offside through waiting for an opening in the loose". The New Zealand selectors Scotty McClymont, Jack Redwood, and Jim Amos chose "eight certainties" for the trip at this point but a second trial was arranged for three days later on 11 July at Carlaw Park. There were still 18 touring places available with 26 players being taken in total. Jones was named in the second row for the New Zealand Probables with George Mitchell his second row teammate once more. They were up against Merv Devine (Richmond) and Walter Cameron (Mount Albert). The Probables won 27–18 with "the big Aucklanders, Mitchell and Jones… prominent in the Probables pack". The Herald noted that they "played well" and at half time they were replaced by Gunn and Clarrie Peterson, presumably as the selectors had seen enough as both were ultimately named in the New Zealand side to tour England.

==== New Zealand selection ====
Jones was named in the New Zealand side to tour England on the evening of 11 July, with the team list published in the 12 July newspapers. There were four middle (second) row forwards named, all of Auckland, Jones, Harold Milliken (Papakura), Pita Ririnui (Manukau), and George Mitchell (Richmond). The Auckland Star wrote that "Ross Jones the 15 stone North Shore forward is deserving of a place and is a young player who should improve". They went on to say that "the baby of the team is Ross Jones, the North Shore forward, who is nineteen years of age". This was an error as he was aged twenty-one years and seven months by this point. It was reported that the team was going to assemble at the Thistle Hotel at 7 o’clock the same evening. The Herald stated that "Jones must be considered lucky to beat either [Joseph] Gunning or [Merv] Devine for a place in the second row". After the players had departed the Gisborne Herald published a short piece on Jones' 'physical attributes' which said "Ross Jones, second row forward in the New Zealand Rugby League team, shouldn’t have much trouble in getting a man-sized grip on English soil. He is reputed to have the largest pair of feet ever to grace Carlaw Park, Auckland, in football boots, anyway. Jones, so the tale goes takes "12s". But then, he is a big fellow – 15st 6 lb and 6 ft 3 ½ in no less. As befits a man with such a sturdy frame, Jones is by calling a son of the soil. He is a farmer at Makataka. Only 21, he is one of the several youngsters in the New Zealand team who are expected to develop no end in England".

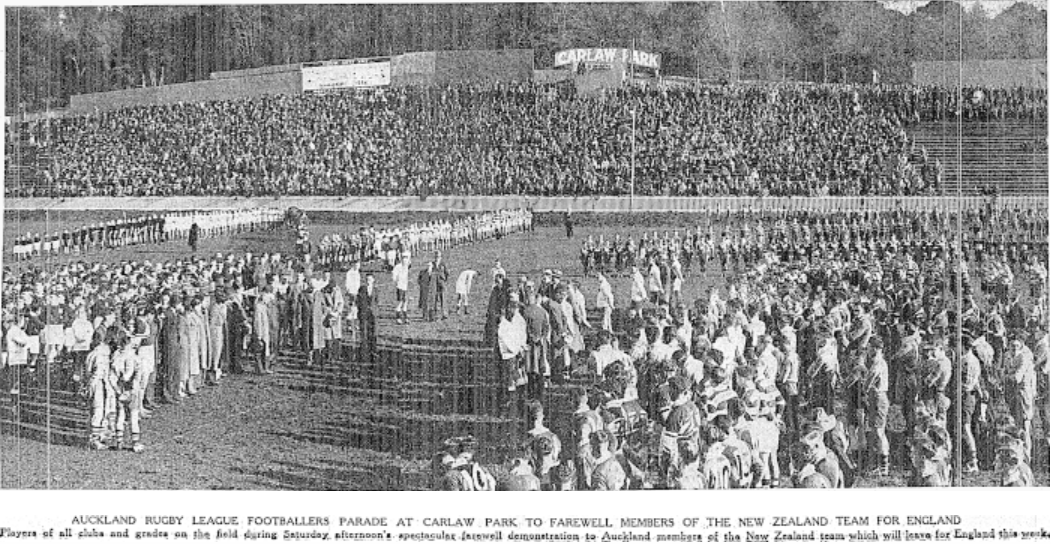
Ross Jones and fellow Auckland members of the New Zealand team being farewelled at Carlaw Park on 22 July.

With the Auckland-based players not leaving the city until 26 July the players were available for the round 14 Fox Memorial championship games on 15 July. Jones was named to play in North Shore's match with Marist at Carlaw Park. North Shore lost 18 points to 5 with the result meaning that North Shore now dropped one point below Mount Albert at the top of the standings. They would go on to lose their next two games along with a draw and a win to finish runner up by 6 points. In the loss to Marist Ted Scott was their best forward but received "good support from McIntosh, Condon and Jones". In addition to losing Jones, the North Shore club was also losing Jack Smith, Verdun Scott, and Ivor Stirling. None of the four were listed in North Shore's side to play their 22 July match with Newton. The Auckland Rugby League held a farewell for the Auckland members of the New Zealand team at Carlaw Park during the afternoon of these games.

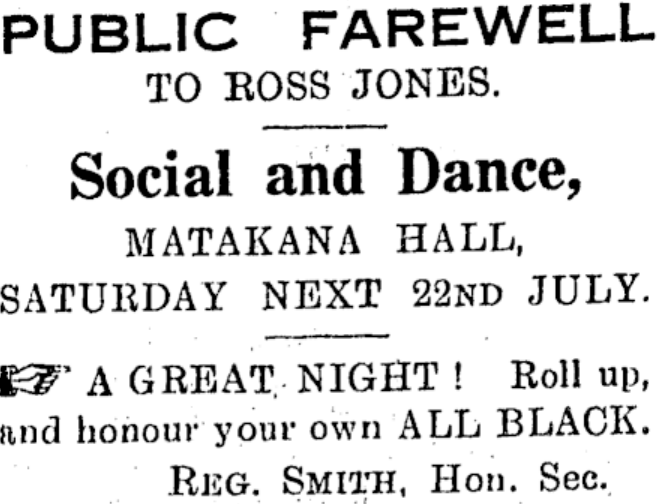

The Rodney and Otamatea Times, Waitemata and Kaipara Gazette published a piece on 19 July on Jones selection in the New Zealand side and details of a function that had been arranged in his honour. It said "our congratulations are extended to Mr Ross Jones, son of Mr and Mrs Donald Jones, of Matakana, on his selection as a member of the New Zealand league team to tour England and France later this year. Mr. Jones, formerly played rugby for the Matakana team and only last season changed over to the league code". And that "a social dance [has been] arranged in his hour, Mr Ross Jones, will be publicly farewelled in the Matakana Hall next Saturday [July 24] evening". An advertisement for the dance was also published in the same publication saying "A Great Night! Roll up, and honour your own All Black". Many attended the farewell with the local newspaper writing a piece which said "the popularity of Mr Ross Jones, of Matakana, a member of the New Zealand league football team to tour England and France during the next five months, was exemplified at a farewell dance held in his honour at the Matakana Hall last Saturday evening. Over 150 couples were present, including guests from as far distant as Putāruru and Auckland. The Matakana football team, of which the guest of honour was formerly a member, was off training for the occasion and a most convivial evening resulted. Speeches were made by Mr Roy Becroft, on behalf of the Rodney Rugby Union, Mr A.J. Watson, on behalf of the Matakana Football Club, and Mr Reg. Smith, who presented Mr Jones, on behalf of the Matakana residents and assembled company, with a solid leather travelling case and a cheque for a substantial sum. The recipient appropriately responded. During the evening two enjoyable vocal numbers were rendered by Mrs H.L. Linton and Mr Alan Tyler-Davies". Prior to the team leaving they raffled off a guitar which Ross won. The entire team signed it and it was taken on tour. Ross' youngest son, Ivor, still has the guitar in his possession.

==== New Zealand tour of England and France ====
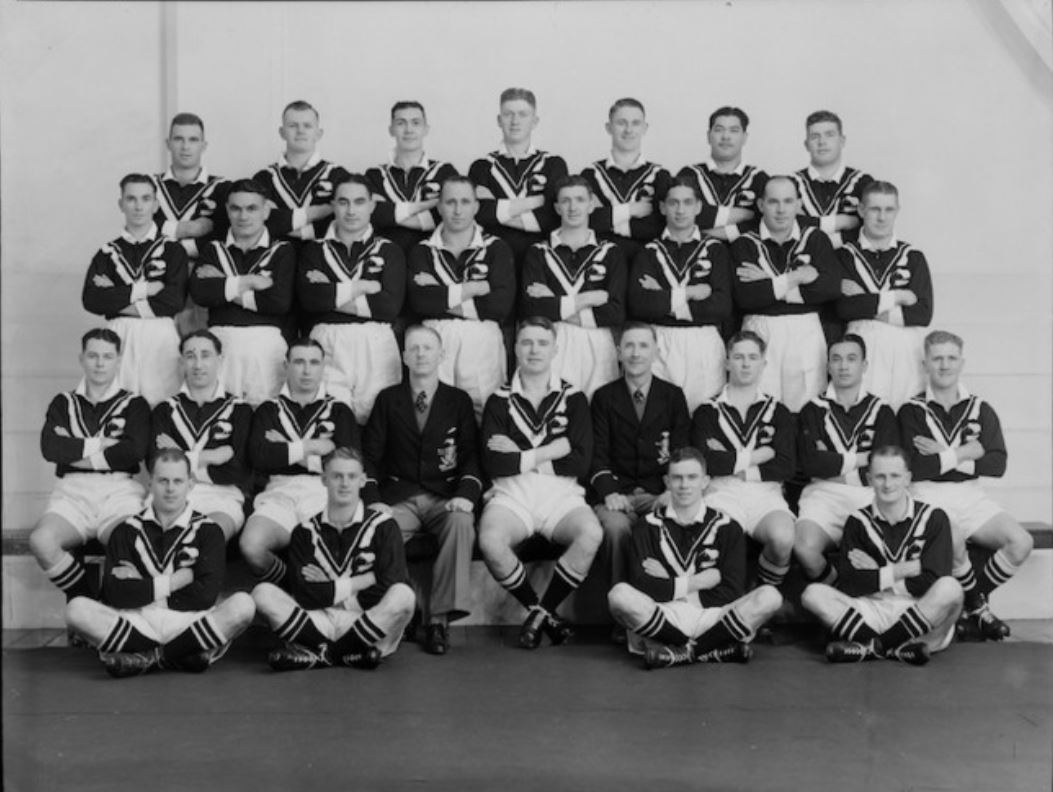
The New Zealand team to tour England in 1939–40.

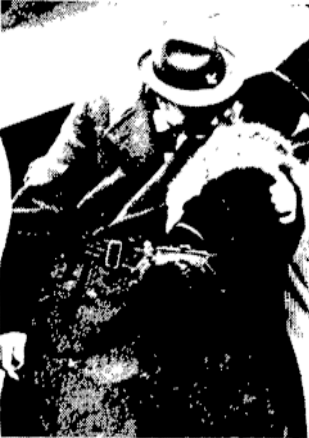
Jones embracing somebody as the Auckland playing members were departing by train for Wellington on 26 July.

The Auckland members of the side got the Express train to Wellington on 26 July. There was a photograph of Jones embracing somebody, possibly his mother, at their farewell from Auckland in the Auckland Star on 27 July. On the morning of the 27th the team and management attended a morning tea in the Parliament Buildings with "good wishes extended to the Kiwis, by Deputy-Prime Minister, the Hon. P, Fraser, who expressed hope that they would have a successful tour".

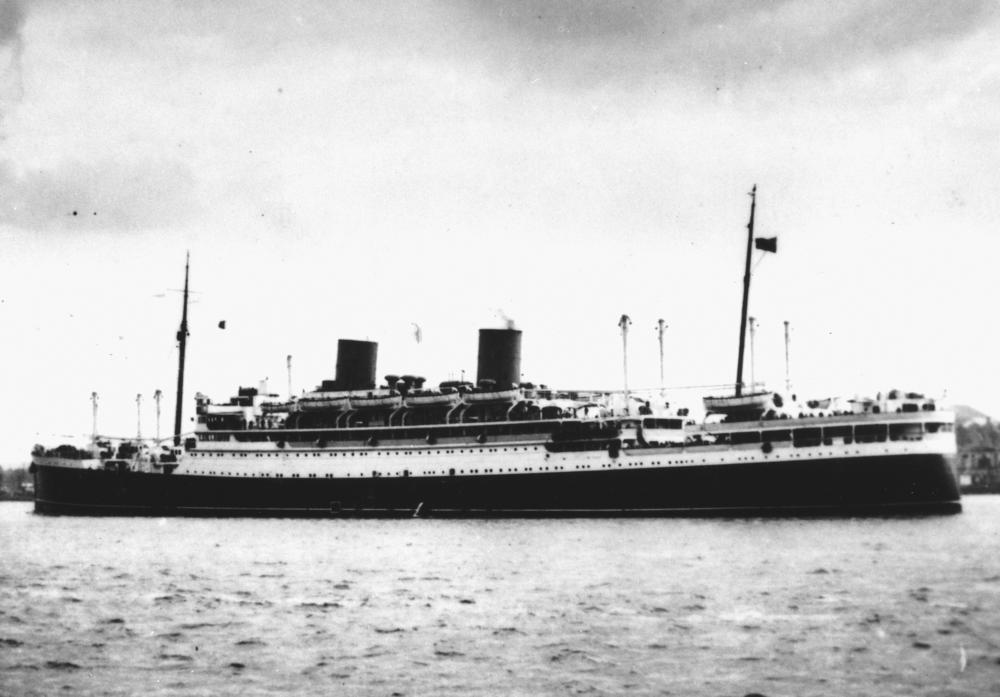
StateLibQld 1 170635 Rangitiki (ship)

The team departed Wellington for London on board the RMS Rangitiki in Tourist Class on Friday 28 July.

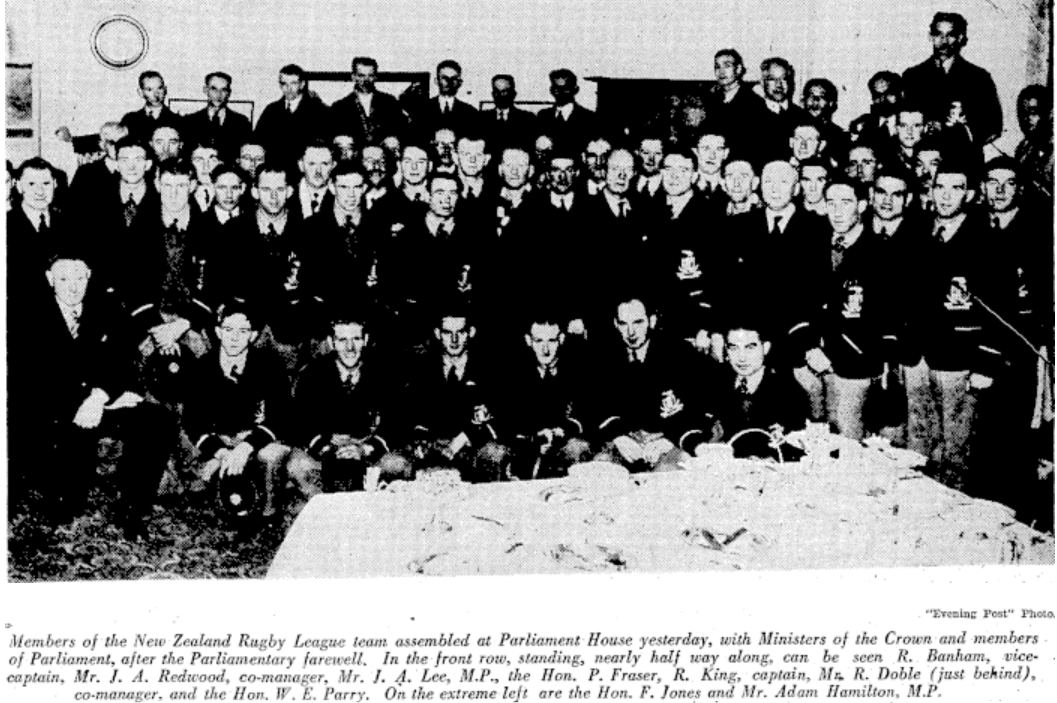
The New Zealand team at a farewell function held in the Parliament Buildings.

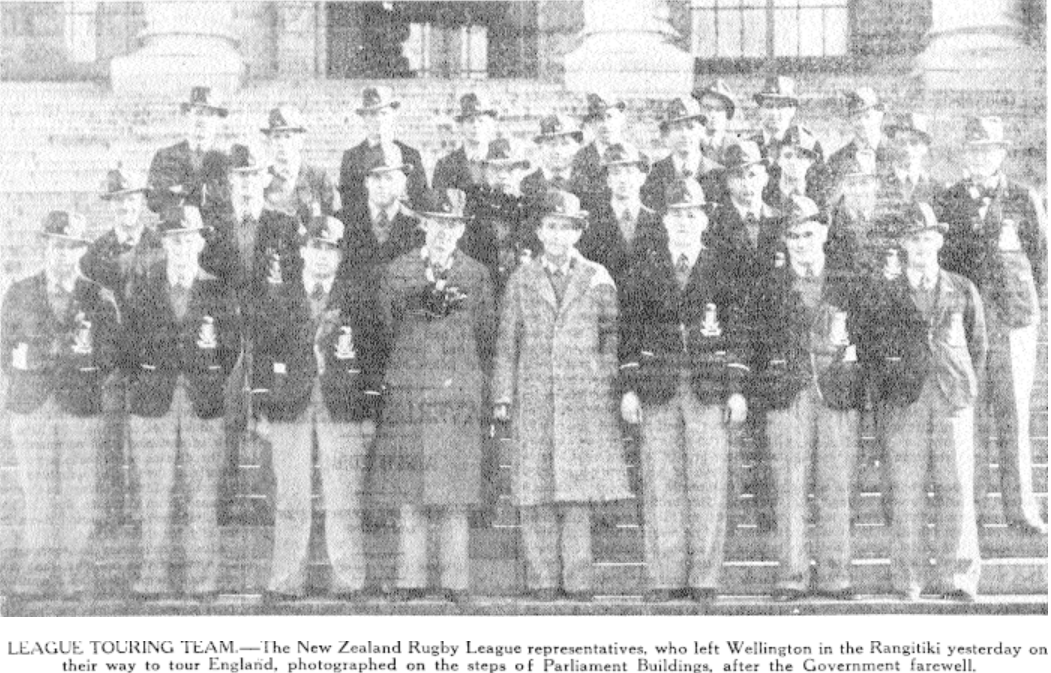
The New Zealand side on the steps of Parliament following their farewell function.

It was intended for the tour to consist of 23 matches in England including three tests and then six or seven matches in France however the tour was to be cut very short due the outbreak of World War 2. The first match of the tour was against St Helens on 2 September with Jones named to play in the second row with Pita Ririnui with Rex King, the tour captain, at lock. New Zealand won 19 points to 3 at Knowsley Road before 4,000 spectators with Jones scoring one of New Zealand's three tries. His try came late in the game to take the score to 17–3 with Jack Hemi converting it. A day later, on 3 September Britain declared war on Germany which effectively ended the tour. The second match against Hull Kingston Rovers scheduled for 7 September was cancelled as arrangements were hurriedly made to get the New Zealand side home.

In a letter from managers Jack Redwood and R. Doble they said after war broke out the team had to stay at Beechwood House, Harrogate in the north of England "under the insistence of the English authorities. The players went on A.R.P. (Air Raid Precaution) work, filling and stacking sandbags, and had agreed to keep together under the circumstances". The team was said to have "experienced one air-raid scare at Harrogate" in Yorkshire. They later moved to a different city and the letter concluded "we hope to see you soon. The boys are disappointed at the turn in events, but are happy and well". The team managed to organise to play Dewsbury on 9 September just prior to their departure. New Zealand won 22–10 at Crown Flatt (Dewsbury) before a crowd of 6,200. Jones played in the second row once more, this time with George Beadle, with George Bellaney at lock. The team then returned to New Zealand on board the same liner which took them to England, the RMS Rangitiki. Following the teams return Jack Redwood said "English critics were greatly impressed by the playing strength of the New Zealand forwards, and two outstanding players were Jones and Milliken".

=== Brief return to North Shore ===
After returning to New Zealand, Jones played some cricket for his Matakana club side, scoring 23 runs in a game against Glorit on 10 February, and then 23 runs again in a match with Tomarata at Matakana on 17 February. A brief piece was then published in the Auckland Star on 15 April titled "Ross Jones Absent" which said "North Shore are unlucky in that they are not likely this season to have the services of Ross Jones, the 15st 7lb Matakana forward, who played well enough, last year to get a place in the team to go to England. His farm is taking all his attention at the moment…". On 10 August he played in a charity rugby union game to raise money for the "Patriotic Funds". He played for the Matakana Barbarians against his old Matakana senior side and scored two tries in an 11–0 win. His first try came from a lineout when he "obtained possession and using his weight hurled himself over the line for a good try". Then in the second half Alf Bell "made a determined run and Ross Jones raced up to take the pass and go over for his second try". As Jones had played rugby league he would have required a reinstatement ruling from the New Zealand Rugby Union to be allowed to play rugby union again, however as this was a charity game outside the jurisdiction of the rugby union authorities, unregistered players were allowed to participate.

In 1941 towards the end of the season Jones travelled to Auckland and played in two matches for North Shore Albions. These were likely to have been his last ever formally competitive games of either rugby league or rugby union. He played in a Phelan Shield game against Mount Albert which they lost on 11 October. North Shore had won the Fox Memorial championship and their final game was for the Stormont Shield on 18 October against Manukau. The Auckland Star wrote "Ross Jones Reappears" and said "prominent in the North Shore forwards was Ross Jones, who made his first appearance this season". After returning to New Zealand "he went back to his farm in the Matakana district, where his work has given him few opportunities to play football. He showed splendid form on Saturday, packing hard in the last-man-down position, and being a fine leader in the loose play". Despite his efforts they lost comfortably 30–10.

== Personal life ==
=== Later sporting involvement ===
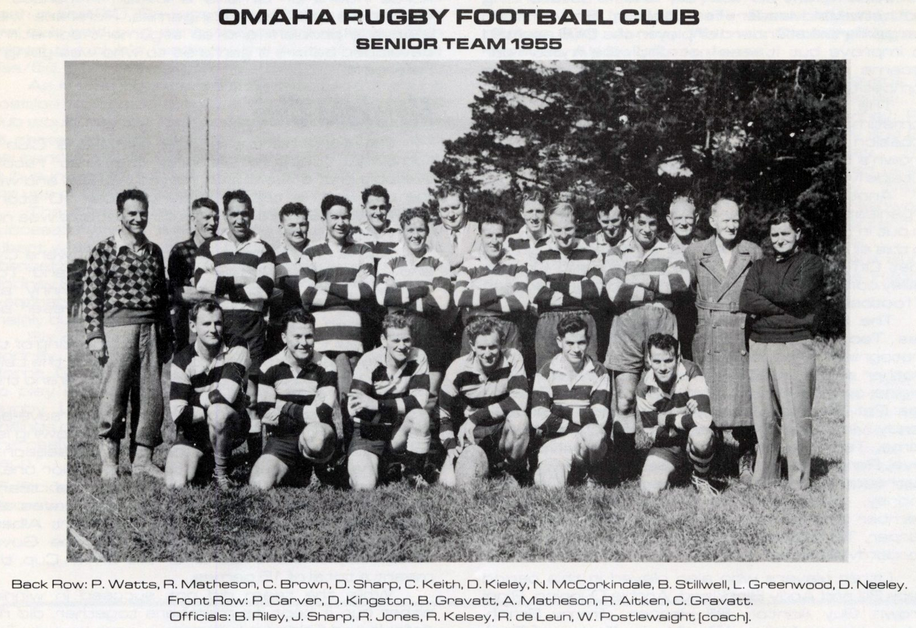
Ross Jones, club official in the centre of the back row.

After retiring from playing, Jones became involved in the Omaha Rugby Club based at the Whangateau Domain through the 1950s. In 1955 the club was struggling financially and Jones was part of a newly elected committee to get "the club out of the red". Ross' sons Murray, Rod and Ivor all played for the club through the 1950s, 60s, and 70s. Ross also played representative tennis for Rodney in the 1940s as well as the Rodney cricket side. In 1969 he was the Warkworth Bowling Club junior champion and was their greenkeeper for 10 years, and president from 1979 to 1981, and became a life member of the club.

=== Farming and family ===
When Jones returned from the England tour he bought a 110-acre farm on the East Coast at Matakana where he milked cows. The farm was on the Omaha Flats moorland. Soon after returning he married Errol Jane May Matthew on 25 May 1940. Ross' older brother, Murray David Jones died on 8 October 1940, aged 30. His parents, Ross, and brother Howard published In Memoriam notices on the anniversary of his death in the following years. Murray had been a New Zealand yachting representative and was the skipper of the Lipton Cup winning crew in 1936 on the Valeria.

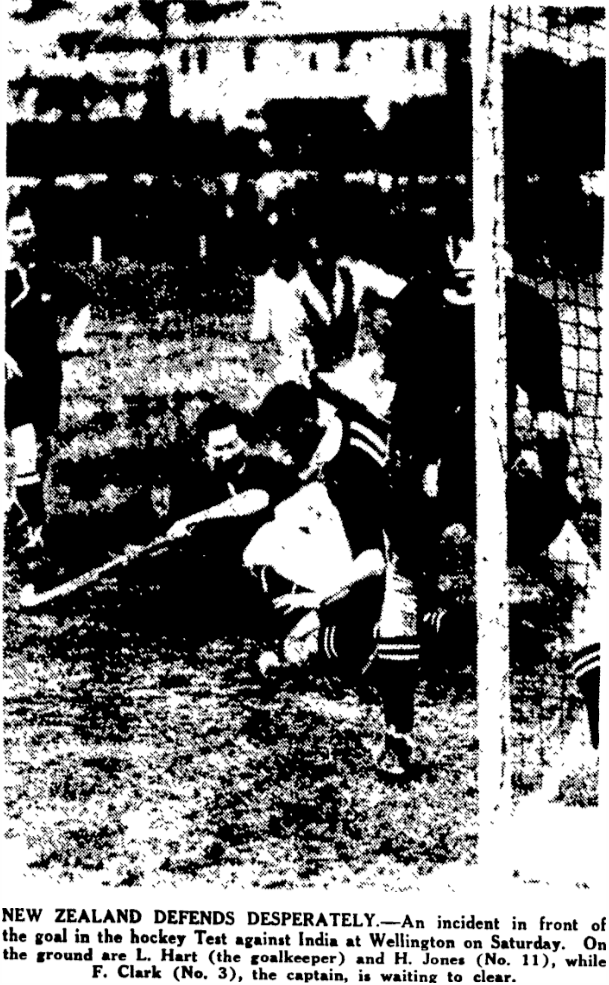
Howard Jones in #11 for New Zealand against India in a 1938 hockey international at Wellington.

While Ross' brother Howard was a New Zealand hockey representative chosen for the tour of Australia in 1932. However he was unable to tour "owing to an accident". He had been running to catch a tram, "slipped and fell heavily, receiving injuries to the knee". Doctors suggested "it would be at least a month before he would be able to play a hockey match". He would be picked to represent New Zealand again in 1938 against the touring Indian side.

In early December, 1940 Ross was balloted for overseas service in World War 2 but he did not go to war. While farming was never declared an essential industry appeals against conscription were often successful and by 1945 farmers "made up a third of the men who had been kept out of the armed forces to work at home". In 1944 an advertisement appeared in the Rodney and Otamatea Times where Jones was selling "2 well-bred pups (sheep)" along with other farm equipment.

Ross and Errol had three sons, Murray Gordon Jones (1942–75), Roderick (Rod) Ross Jones (1945–present), and Ivor Jones (1947–present). Murray became an All Black in 1973, representing them in five matches including a test against the touring England side in 1973. He also played for the Junior All Blacks (1965), Auckland (1964–69), and North Auckland (1970–74). In 1975 he drowned in Auckland Harbour while attempting to rescue his two-year-old son Jamie, following a yachting accident where he had fallen overboard. He was buried at North Shore Memorial Park. Middle son, Rod Jones was a winger and centre who played club rugby union for Takapuna and Omaha, and representative rugby for Auckland Colts (1966), North Auckland (1968–75), All Black Trialist (1970), and New Zealand Barbarians (1973). Ivor also represented the Rodney Rugby Union and played for the senior Omaha side.

=== Death ===
Ross and Errol lived on their Matakana farm throughout the 1940s, 50s, and 60s before they retired from their farm on Jones Road to live in Warkworth in 1973. After moving to Warkworth they lived on Victoria Street. Ross died on 30 May 1985, aged 67. Errol, died on 11 November 2016, aged 102.
