= Lorrie Hunter =

New Zealand politician (1900–1990)

Lorrie Hunter QSM
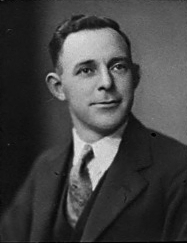

Member of the New Zealand Parliament for Manawatu
- In office 27 November 1935 – 15 October 1938
- Preceded by: Joseph Linklater
- Succeeded by: John Cobbe

Personal details
- Born: 11 May 1900 Waimea West, New Zealand
- Died: 1 July 1990 (aged 90) Auckland, New Zealand
- Party: Labour
- Spouse: Anne Pye (m. 1921; died 1965)
- Children: 5
- Relatives: Ivor Stirling (son-in-law); Glenda Stirling (granddaughter); Ken Stirling (grandson)

Clifford Lorrie Hunter QSM (11 May 1900 – 1 July 1990) was a New Zealand politician of the Labour Party.

== Early life and family ==
Hunter was born at Waimea West on 11 May 1900, the son of Gordon MacKay Hunter and Edith Constance Hunter (née Andrews). His father was an "active supporter" of Independent MHR for Nelson, Harry Atmore. Hunter married Theresa Anne Gertrude Pye in Wellington on 24 August 1921.

After leaving school Hunter became a flax and scrub cutter before moving to Wellington in 1920 to become a tram driver. He joined the trade union movement and became president of the Wellington Tramways' Union and later vice-president of the Tramways Federation of New Zealand. He was also a dominion councillor of the Alliance of Labour and a long time member of the Workers' Educational Association (WEA).

== Political career ==
New Zealand Parliament
Years	Term	Electorate	Party
1935–1938	25th	Manawatu	Labour

Shortly after moving to Wellington in 1920 Hunter joined the Labour Party and was secretary of Labour's Island Bay branch. Hunter unsuccessfully contested the Manawatu in the 1931 election for the Labour Party against the incumbent, Joseph Linklater of the Reform Party. Initially he was set to stand in Wairarapa but changed to Manawatu at the insistence of Labour's general-secretary Walter Nash. In 1935, Hunter in turn beat Linklater. Linklater disputed the result and was granted a magisterial recount. The recount did not alter the result and Hunter remained in parliament. In 1938, the seat boundaries had changed considerably absorbing the abolished electorate of Oroua. Manawatu lost Labour voting areas such as Foxton, Shannon and Levin leading Hunter to anticipate losing the seat. Hunter was defeated by National's John Cobbe.

== Later life and death ==
After exiting parliament Hunter was in a precarious financial position stating "I didn't have a penny to bless myself with. We had five children, got £400 a year and had to keep a house in the electorate and one in Wellington." He was given a job by Paddy Webb, the Minister of Labour as a liaison officer. He was not in the position long until National MP Sidney Holland challenged his appointment citing "an obscure law, an old English act," which barred former Members of Parliament from assuming Government jobs until one year after leaving Parliament. Hunter never attempted to re-enter politics again. He then moved to Auckland to take up a position as a conciliation commissioner where he mediated between workers and employers in industrial disputes. He retired from the role in 1969 but was recalled to his position temporarily in 1974 when the entire industrial award system had to be re-negotiated following then end of economic stabilisation regulations.

In 1985 he attended an event held at Parliament to celebrate 50 years since the First Labour Government along with the only other MPs from 1935 still alive, Sir Arnold Nordmeyer and Ormond Wilson. In the 1987 Queen's Birthday Honours, Hunter was awarded the Queen's Service Medal for public services. Earlier that year he had tacitly supported many of the controversial "Rogernomics" reforms. In 1990, he was awarded the New Zealand 1990 Commemoration Medal.

He died in Waitakere Hospital in 1990, survived by his son and four daughters (his wife Anne having predeceased him in 1965). At the time of his death he was the last surviving member of the first Labour government. He was buried in Purewa Cemetery, Auckland.

== Notes ==
New Zealand Parliament
Preceded by Joseph Linklater	Member of Parliament for Manawatu; 1935–1938	Succeeded by John Cobbe
