= Swagerty =

Swagerty is a surname. Notable people with the surname include:

- Jane Swagerty (born 1951), American swimmer
- Keith Swagerty (born 1945), American basketball player and coach
