= Nguyễn Thị Mỹ Liên =

Vietnamese swimmer

Personal information
- Born: 31 July 1951 (age 74) Hanoi, Vietnam

Sport
- Sport: Swimming

Nguyễn Thị Mỹ Liên (born 31 July 1951) is a Vietnamese former swimmer. She competed in the women's 100 metre backstroke at the 1968 Summer Olympics.
