= Howard Firby =

Canadian swimmer and coach (1924–1991)

Biographical details
- Born: September 18, 1924; Montgomery, Alabama, U.S.
- Died: March 30, 1991 (aged 66); West Vancouver, British Columbia, Canada

Coaching career (HC unless noted)
- 1948–1956: Vancouver Amateur SC; Volunteer, Asst. Coach, Head Coach
- 1955–1967: Canadian Dolphins SC; Vancouver, BC
- 1964: Canadian Olympic Team Coach; Tokyo Olympics
- 1967–1969: Cardinal Swim Club; Winnipeg, Manitoba
- 1969-1973: Killarny SC, North Vancouver SC; Swimtec Toronto (1973); Author, Coach Consultant (For Canadian Government)
- 1974–1980: Juan de Fuca Cohoes; Victoria, B.C. Later Island Swimming
- 1983-1985: Victoria Olympians; Master Coach/Consultant
- 1987: Canadian Dolphins SC; Stroke Coach, Records

Accomplishments and honors

Championships
- 6 x Canadian National team title 1961, 1962, 1963, 1964, 1966, 1967 (Canadian Dolphins)

Awards
- 1977 British Columbia Sports Hall of Fame; 1979 Canadian Sports Hall of Fame; 1982 Canadian Aquatic Hall of Fame; 1985 International Swim. Hall of Fame

Howard Baldwin Firby (September 18, 1924 – March 30, 1991) was a Canadian swim coach and founding coach of the Canadian Dolphins Swim Club. He led the Dolphins to six Canadian National team championships from 1961–1967. At the 1964 Olympics, he was the Canadian Olympic team Coach. Nationally recognized for his coaching achievements in Canada by the Canadian Sports Hall of Fame, he was a founding member of the Canadian Swim Coaches Association, and the Director of the Canadian Amateur Swimming Association. In club coaching, Firby trained and mentored around seven Canadian Olympians to one gold, two silver, and 1 bronze medal.

== Early life and military service ==
Firby was born September 18, 1924, to Canadian parents in Montgomery, Alabama. He moved to Regina, Saskatchewan with his family when he was nine. He competed in track and field in his youth. Firby served as a WWII pilot in the Royal Canadian Air Force. He began swimming to rehabilitate his right leg that had been disabled from polio around 1944 when Firby was 20. Treating Firby's polio required hospitalization and eventually ended his service in the Royal Canadian Air Force. After returning home to Regina, Firby began swimming at a local YMCA as therapy for his leg. He heard of the Vancouver Swim Club while attending the Vancouver School of Art.

== Coaching ==
According to one source, Firby may have coached swimming briefly at a small club in his hometown of Regina, Saskatchewan before moving to Vancouver, British Columbia. He worked as a lifeguard in Saskatoon, and was a competent swimmer.

=== Vancouver Amateur Swim Club ===
Around 1948, after his military service, he moved to Vancouver, British Columbia where he swam for a period with the Vancouver Amateur Swim Club, a large and highly competitive program. He began around 1948 as a volunteer and then an Assistant Coach at the Vancouver Club, where he was mentored by Head Coach Percy Norman, a Canadian Coach at both the 1932, and 1936 Olympics. When Norman died around 1954, Firby became Head Coach, serving in that role from 1954–1956.

=== Canadian Dolphin Swim team ===
In 1956, Firby founded Vancouver's Canadian Dolphin Swim team beginning with seven members, and found success during his eleven year coaching tenure which ended in 1967. In its early years, the Dolphins met at Vancouver's Crystal Pool at Sunset Beach, but moved to the Vancouver Aquatic Center in 1974.The Dolphins won six national team championships between 1961–1967, with the exception of the year 1965. Their swimmers set 11 world records and over 300 Canadian National records. The Dolphins won over 100 Canadian championships, with their swimmers capturing around ten gold medals in International Games.

=== Cardinal SC, Killarney Swim Club ===
From 1967-69, Firby coached the Cardinal Swim Club in Winnipeg, Manitoba, due to an attractive $11,000 a yr. salary, and their 50-metre Pan American Games Pool. Accepting the Cardinal Club position, he became one of the few Canadian full-time professional swim coaches. While in Winnipeg, Firby also taught physical education at the University of Manitoba, and helped coach the University of Manitoba Swim Team for about two years. In September 1969, he returned to greater Vancouver to Coach the Killarney Swim Club at Vancouver's Killarney Community Center, pleased to be back in his former hometown with a few former swimmers, and tired of the cooler weather in Winnipeg which affected his bad leg. He later coached the North Vancouver Club.

=== Consulting, CASA Director, Swimtec Toronto ===
From 1969-1972, in addition to occasional coaching, he worked on a swimming rules book, and toured the country giving advice to swim clubs on coaching methods and organization. Frequently on the move, in May 1972, Firby left Vancouver for Ottawa to advise the Canadian government on how to attract world class swimmers for the 1976 Montreal Olympics. From 1970-1972, he was a served as Director and National Technical Advisor to the Canadian Amateur Swimming Association. He then spent six months at Fort Lauderdale's International Swimming Hall of Fame in the U.S., primarily as an artist. In November 1973, Firby, worked with a $15,000 Canadian government award granted for one year to Swimtec Ontario to head a group of internationally qualified coaches to train top level Canadian swimmers. The top level training occurred at the coach-owned Swimtec Club in Toronto, Ontario, where Firby coached for a period with Coach Nick Thierry. Thierry and Firby became members of the Canadian Swim Coaches and Teachers Association Hall of Fame in 2014. During this time, Firby was a national coach and coordinator of the Canadian Amateur Swimming Association.

=== Cohoes Club, Victoria Olympians ===
Beginning in September, 1974, through 1980 he coached the Juan de Fuca Cohoes Club in Victoria which initially operated out of the Centennial Pool in Colwood, just West of downtown Victoria. A heart attack temporarily ended his full time coaching responsibilities around 1982. He would serve as a consulting Master Coach to the Victoria Olympians beginning around 1983 through around 1986. Both teams later became a division of Island Swimming under Coach Ron Jacks. Jacks, a swimmer for James "Doc" Counsilman at Indiana, and a three-time Olympian for Canada, was mentored under Firby for a period and credited him for much of what he learned of stroke technique. Dr. Peter Vizsolyi, who would coach swimming at the nearby University of Victoria, also credited Firby for his contributions to swimming. Vizsolyi had swum with Firby as a youth in Vancouver.

Around 1987, near the end of his career Firby returned to work with his former team, the Canadian Dolphins in Vancouver as a stroke coach and records keeper.

== International coaching ==
Firby was an assistant or head coach for Canadian teams competing in swimming at the Olympic Games in 1964, the British Empire and Commonwealth Games in 1954 and 1958 and the Pan American Games in 1955 and 1971.

In service to the swimming community, in 1966, Firby was the first President and the founder of the Canadian Swimming Coaches Association.

He applied his knowledge of aerodynamics, learned as a Canadian pilot, and his knowledge of anatomy and biomechanics, to find ways to improve the stroke techniques of his swimmers. His career as an illustrator allowed him to illustrate how he wanted his swimmers to position their body and limbs to maximize the efficiency and aerodynamics of their strokes.

=== Outstanding swimmers ===
Swimmers he coached included Canadian Olympians Elaine Tanner, Bill Slater, Anne Walton, and Mary Stewart, Helen Stewart Hunt, Margaret Iwasaki and Nikki Dryden. Elaine Tanner won two silvers and a bronze medal at the 1968 Mexico Olympics in backstroke and freestyle relay events. She won 17 national titles primarily in backstroke, four gold medals at the Commonwealth Games, and set two world records.

1956 Canadian Olympian Helen Stewart Hunt won a gold medal in freestyle at the 1959 Pan American Games. Firby switched Helen's sister Mary Stewart, a 1960 and 1964 Olympic competitor from freestyle to butterfly, and in 1961, she won a gold medal in the 100-yard butterfly at the 1962 Commonwealth Games. Nikki Dryden, a 1992–1996 Olympian for Canadian, swam with Firby with the Victoria Olympians in Victoria around 1985-1986. Firby was also an instructor to two-time Olympic backstroker Anne Walton, and 880-yard freestyle record holder Jane Hughes. Bill Slater competed in the 400 and 1500 metre freestyle at the 1956 Olympics. He also coached 1960 Olympian Margaret Iwasaki with the Canadian Dolphins.

== Publications ==
Firby authored and illustrated Howard Firby on Swimming, first published in 1975 by Pelman Books Ltd. of London. In the 1970's, he authored the Canadian Amateur Swimming Association rule handbook. In 1978, he co-authored Swimming Coaching at the Club Level with Arend Bonen, Murray Smith, Canadian Olympic Coach Derk Snelling, and Dan Talbott.

== Later years and death ==
He retired from active coaching around 1985.

Firby died at 66 on March 30, 1991 in Vancouver, Canada. A memorial service was held on April 5, at Hollywood Funeral Home in West Vancouver.

=== Honors ===
In 2007, he was inducted into the Swimming Canada Circle of Excellence. In 1977, he was inducted into the British Columbia Sports Hall of Fame. In 1979, he was inducted into the Canadian Sports Hall of Fame, and in 1982 was inducted into the Canadian Aquatic Hall of Fame.

In 1985, he became a member of the International Swimming Hall of Fame as an Honor Coach. In April 1991, Firby was honored at Canada's World Cup Meet at Crystal Pool in Victoria. In 2014, Nick Thierry, with whom Firby coached Swimtec in Toronto around 1972, and Firby were inducted into the Canadian Swim Coaches and Teachers Association Hall of Fame.
