= Judit Baranyi =

Hungarian swimmer

Personal information
- Born: 17 April 1954 (age 72) Mezőkövesd, Hungary

Sport
- Sport: Swimming

Judit Baranyi (born 17 April 1954) is a Hungarian former swimmer. She competed in the women's 100 metre backstroke at the 1968 Summer Olympics.
