= Doris Meister =

German swimmer

Personal information
- Born: 9 January 1952 (age 74) Großostheim, Germany

Sport
- Sport: Swimming

Doris Meister (born 9 January 1952) is a German former swimmer. She competed in the women's 100 metre backstroke at the 1968 Summer Olympics.
