= Jane Swagerty =

American swimmer

Personal information
- Full name: Jane Ellen Swagerty
- National team: United States
- Born: July 30, 1951 (age 75) Oakdale, California, U.S.
- Height: 5 ft 8 in (1.73 m)
- Weight: 143 lb (65 kg)
- Spouses: Camden Caldwell '74; Don Hill
- Children: 2 Daughters

Sport
- Sport: Swimming
- Events: 100 backstroke, 4x100 Medley relay
- Strokes: Backstroke
- Club: West Lane Tennis and Swim Club; Santa Clara Swim Club
- College team: University of the Pacific; Southern Oregon University
- Coach: Fred Van Dyke (West Lane); George Haines (Santa Clara SC)
Medal record
Women's swimming
Representing the United States
Olympic Games
Bronze medal – third place	1968 Mexico City	100 m backstroke

Jane Ellen Swagerty (born July 30, 1951), later known by her married names, Jane Caldwell, and Jane Swagerty Hill, is an American former competition swimmer who competed for Southern Oregon University and was a 1968 Mexico City Olympic bronze medalist in the 100-meter backstroke. After the birth of her two daughters, she returned to competitive swimming in middle age, became an accomplished U.S. Masters Swimmer and had a second marriage to Don Hill.

== Early life ==
Swagerty was born July 30, 1951, in Oakdale, California, the third of four children to father Floyd E. Swagerty and mother, Melva Virginia. A community leader, Jane's father Floyd served as the Assistant Superintendent of the Lincoln Unified School District and as President of the North Stockton Rotary Club. Jane's mother Melva was a school district librarian. Growing up in Stockton, she attended Lincoln High School, graduating in 1968. From an athletic family, Jane's father Floyd played football for College of the Pacific, and Jane's cousin Keith Swagerty was an All-American basketball player for the University of the Pacific, later playing professionally for the Houston Mavericks. Her swimming career began around age five, with the local Lincoln Swim Team, training at the community pool in Lincoln Village. She began to gain local attention in swimming by the age of 11, and by 14 represented Stockton's West Lane Tennis and Swim Club under Coach Fred Van Dyke. Swimming for the West Lane Club in May 1965, she qualified and won a title in the 100 backstroke at the Junior Olympic Championships with a time of 1:06.6 at Arden Hills Swim Club in Sacramento. An early multi-stroke competitor, at the Alameda Air Station Meet in February 1965, in the 13-14 age group category, she placed third in breaststroke, and fourth in both back and butterfly.

Relocating to Santa Clara in her Junior Year, she attended San Jose's Camden High School, and lived with her Aunt and Uncle in San Jose so she could train and compete with the Santa Clara Swim Club under Hall of Fame Coach George Haines. She returned to Lincoln High in her Senior Year.

In the National Junior Olympics in 1966, Swagerty set an age group record for 15-17-year olds in the 100 backstroke.

On April 11, 1969, Swagerty helped set an American record in the 400 medley of 4:00.8 at the National AAU Short Course Swimming Championship in Long Beach. Swagerty swam with the team of Jan Lenne, Lynn Vidali, and Linda Gustavson.

== 1968 Mexico City Olympics ==
At the 1968 Olympic trials in Los Angeles on August 28, despite swimming with a badly cut stitched finger, Swagerty finished second in the finals of the 100-meter backstroke to Olympic team mate, Kaye Hall. Swagerty subsequently trained six weeks with the U.S. Olympic team in Colorado Springs to increase her competitive edge and adjust to the altitude of Mexico City. During her Olympic training and later competition she was managed by 1968 U.S. Women's Olympic Coach Sherm Chavoor of the Arden Hills Swim Club in Sacramento.

After qualifying for the U.S. team, and training in Colorado, Swagerty represented the United States as a 17-year-old at the 1968 Summer Olympics in Mexico City in October. On October 23, 1968, Swagerty received a bronze medal for her third-place performance in the women's 100-meter backstroke (1:08.1), finishing behind fellow American Kaye Hall who set a world record of (1:06.2) and Canadian Elaine Tanner who swam a (1:06.7).

In a memorable event, Swagerty swam the backstroke leg in the preliminary heats of the women's 100-meter medley relay for the gold medal-winning U.S. team, but did not receive a medal under the 1968 international swimming rules because she did not swim in the event final. A later rules change would have allowed Swagerty to receive the medal.

After her return from the Mexico City Olympics, Swaggerty was honored by a rally in Stockton's Lincoln High Gymnasium. Swaggerty's brother Grant died in a bicycle accident in March 1969. She become a known figure around Stockton, speaking at clubs, and accepting a variety of awards. After her time at the Olympics, and graduating from High School, Swagerty announced she would retire from elite competitive swimming in June of 1969, but later changed course and had a notable career as a collegiate swimmer.

== College of the Pacific, Southern Oregon ==
Swagerty briefly attended the College of the Pacific in San Jose. She transferred and continued to swim for Southern Oregon University, where in 1971, she set a 50 yard backstroke American collegiate record of 28.54. Swagerty's older brother Brian also swam for Southern Oregon. Demonstrating achievement in multiple strokes, Swagerty later tied the collegiate national record for the 100 yard backstroke, and in the individual medley event, established a new regional record as well. As of 2024, her Southern Oregon records remain.

After a prior marriage to Camden Stanford Caldwell in June 1974, where she took the name Jane Swagerty Caldwell, Swaggerty later married Don Hill, a fellow United States Master's swimmer, and the couple raised her two daughters from her previous marriage.

As Jane Swagerty-Hill, she participated in Masters Swimming competition from the ages of 51-62, securing a large number of first place finishes in local, and a few national meets primarily in 50 and 100 backstroke, breast, and freestyle events. At 51, at the Arizona State Masters Long Course Swimming Championships, Swagerty set a age group world record for women 50-54 in the 50-meter backstroke with a time of 33.52 seconds. In 1996, she lived with her husband Don and her two daughters in Atherton, California, in greater San Francisco, and 18 miles Southwest of San Jose.

=== Honors ===
In March, 1969, Swaggerty was honored as Stockton's Athlete of the Year at a local banquet, and was recognized for her bronze medal by the California State legislature in a resolution written by Congressman Robert Morgan. In honors with greater distinction, Swagerty was a member of the Hall of Fame of her native Stockton, California, and was admitted to the Southern Oregon University Hall of Fame in 1990.

== See also ==
- List of Olympic medalists in swimming (women)
- List of University of the Pacific (United States) people
