= List of University of the Pacific (United States) people =

This is a list of notable alumni and faculty of University of the Pacific (United States).

== Alumni ==
=== Academia ===
- Arthur A. Dugoni, 1948 (DEN), dean of University of the Pacific School of Dentistry (1978–2006); served as president of the American Dental Association (1988–1989), American Dental Association Foundation; American Association of Dental Schools, and California Dental Association, and as treasurer of the Federation Dentaire Internationale (FDI World Dental Federation)
- William A. Finley, 1863 (non-graduate), first president of Oregon State University
- Joseph Pomeroy Widney, 1863, second president of the University of Southern California (1891-1895), co-founder of the Church of the Nazarene

=== Business ===
- Bob Bejan, 1982, chief development officer of MSLGROUP
- Joseph R. Knowland, 1895, politician; publisher of the Oakland Tribune newspaper
- Alex Spanos, 1948, billionaire and owner of the San Diego Chargers
- Dean Spanos, 1972, team president and CEO, San Diego Chargers

=== Entertainment ===
- Alan Autry, 1975, actor, politician, and former National Football League (NFL) football player
- Dave Brubeck, 1942, jazz pianist and founder of the Brubeck Institute
- Dean Butler, 1979, television actor, producer
- Robert Culp, 1949, actor
- Jamie Lee Curtis, 1979 (non-graduate), actress
- Doris Dörrie, 1975, German film director and producer
- David Gerber, 1950, Golden Globe, Emmy and Peabody Award-winning TV producer/executive
- Chris Isaak, 1980, actor and musician
- Janet Leigh, 1947 (non-graduate), actress
- Bridget Marquardt, 2000 (master's degree in Comm.), Playboy Playmate; one of the stars of The Girls Next Door
- Steve Martini, 1974 (JD), NY Times bestselling author of legal novels
- Darren McGavin, 1948 (non-graduate), television and film actor
- Joseph C. Phillips (non-graduate), actor and conservative Christian
- Irene Roberts, 2006, mezzo-soprano with the Deutsche Opera Berlin
- Jo Van Fleet, 1941, actress

=== Government and politics ===
- Greg Aghazarian, 1993 (JD), former California State Assemblyman
- Duke Aiona, 1977, former lieutenant governor of Hawaii
- Arif Alvi, 1984, president of Pakistan
- Mark Amodei, 1983 (JD), United States representative for Nevada's 2nd congressional district
- Alan Autry, 1975, former mayor of Fresno, California
- Frank W. Benson, 1877, 12th governor of Oregon
- Henry L. Benson, 1873, 44th associate justice of the Oregon Supreme Court
- Elwood Bruner, 1874, state assembly member in the 1890s
- Connie Callahan, 1975, judge, Ninth U.S. Circuit Court of Appeals
- Gustavus Cheyney Doane, 1861, U.S. Army, member of Washburn-Langford-Doane Expedition to Yellowstone in 1870
- John Doolittle, 1978, United States House of Representatives
- John Duarte, 1997 (MBA), U.S. representative from California
- Morrison England, 1976, 1983 (JD), U.S. district court judge
- Noreen Evans, 1971 (JD), California state assemblywoman
- John M. Gerrard, 1981 (JD), Nebraska Supreme Court
- Mikayil Jabbarov, 1998 (JD), Minister of Education of the Azerbaijan Republic
- Joseph R. Knowland, 1895 United States House of Representatives
- Bill Lockyer, 1986E (JD), California attorney general
- Ronald O. Loveridge, 1960, former mayor of Riverside, California
- Hal Malchow, 1973, political consultant
- Mark Meckler, 1988 (JD), political activist
- Robert T. Monagan, 1942, 55th speaker of California State Assembly
- George Moscone, 1953, California state senator and 37th mayor of San Francisco
- James C. Needham, 1886, U.S. representative from California
- Susan B. Neuman, 1978 (EdD), prominent literacy researcher, educator and author; US Assistant Secretary of Elementary and Secondary Education 2001–2003
- Theodore Olson, 1962, lawyer and 42nd solicitor general of the United States
- Johnnie Rawlinson, 1979D (JD), Ninth U.S. Circuit Court of Appeals
- Alfred E. Reames, 1891 (non-graduate), United States senator
- Vice Admiral Robert D. Sharp, 1985, director of the National Geospatial-Intelligence Agency

=== Science and engineering ===
- José M. Hernández, 1985, NASA astronaut
- Steven Kistler, 1921 (non-graduate), inventor of Aerogel
- George Tchobanoglous, 1958, professor of engineering at University of California, Davis

=== Sports ===
- Bob Adams, 1969, former NFL tight end
- Dick Bass, 1958, former Los Angeles Rams Pro Bowl running back
- Ryan Benjamin, 1992, football player
- Greg Bishop, 1993, former NFL offensive tackle 1993–1999
- Tristan Blackmon, 2017, professional soccer player for Los Angeles FC
- Scott Boras, 1977, 1982 (JD), Major League Baseball agent
- Don Campora, 1950, former football offensive tackle for the San Francisco 49ers and the Washington Redskins
- Pete Carroll, 1973, Super Bowl-winning coach of the Seattle Seahawks and former head football coach at the University of Southern California
- Kyra Christmas, 2017, member of Canada women's national water polo team, competed in 2020 Summer Olympics
- Clyde Conner, 1956, former professional football player for the San Francisco 49ers
- Bruce Coslet, 1968, former NFL head coach for the New York Jets and Cincinnati Bengals
- Heather Cox, 1992, former volleyball player, now ESPN sideline reporter & NBC Olympics reporter
- Gene Cronin, 1956, former football defensive end for the Detroit Lions, Washington Redskins, and the Dallas Cowboys
- Dell Demps, 1992, 1998, former pro basketball player, now New Orleans Pelicans general manager
- Tom Flores, 1958, retired Super Bowl-winning coach of the Oakland Raiders of the National Football League
- Wayne Hardin, 1950, head football coach at the United States Naval Academy 1959–1964
- Willard Harrell, 1974, former NFL running back, Green Bay Packers, 1975–1977, St. Louis Cardinals, 1977–1984
- Walt Harris, 1967, former head football coach at Stanford University and University of Pittsburgh
- Wayne Hawkins, 1960, former AFL All-Star, Oakland Raiders
- Willie Hector, 1961, former NFL player
- Bob Heinz, 1969, former NFL defensive tackle, Miami Dolphins and Washington Redskins
- D.J. Houlton, 2001, former pitcher for the Los Angeles Dodgers
- Honor Jackson, 1971, former NFL safety
- Hue Jackson, 1986, former NFL Head Coach of the Oakland Raiders and Cleveland Browns
- Jennifer Joines, 2004, USA volleyball Olympian (2008)
- Carl Kammerer, 1967, football defensive end and linebacker, San Francisco 49ers and Washington Redskins
- Eddie LeBaron, 1950, former NFL football player and NFL executive
- Bob Lee, 1967, former professional football player
- Lionel Manuel, 1984 (non-graduate), former New York Giants wide receiver
- Phil Martinovich, 1938, football player
- Mike Merriweather, 1982, Pittsburgh Steelers and Minnesota Vikings pro-bowl linebacker
- John Nisby, 1957, former Pittsburgh Steelers and Washington Redskins offensive guard
- Mark Nordquist, 1967, former NFL offensive guard
- Alex Obert, 2016, member of United States men's national water polo team, competed in 2016 Summer Olympics and 2020 Summer Olympics
- Elaina Oden, 1989, two-time Olympic volleyball player
- Michael Olowokandi, 1998, former NBA player and 1st overall pick in 1998 NBA draft
- Stu Pederson, 1981 (non-graduate), former Major League Baseball player, Los Angeles Dodgers
- Brian Peets, 1978, former NFL tight end
- Shawn Price, 1993, former football defensive end in the NFL for the Tampa Bay Buccaneers, Carolina Panthers, Buffalo Bills, and San Diego Chargers
- Duane Putnam, 1952, former NFL Pro Bowl player
- Greg Robinson, 1976, former NFL assistant coach and current Michigan Wolverines defensive coordinator
- Bill Sandeman, 1965, former NFL offensive tackle, Atlanta Falcons
- Brad Schumacher, 1997, 2005 (MBA), two-time Olympian (1996 swimming, 2000 water polo) and two-time Olympic gold medalist (1996 swimming)
- Ben Stevenson, 2016, member of United States men's national water polo team, competed in 2020 Summer Olympics
- Jane Swagerty, 1966, competitive swimmer and 1968 Olympic bronze medalist
- Kevin Turner, 1980, former football linebacker for the New York Giants, Washington Redskins, Seattle Seahawks, and Cleveland Browns
- Herm Urenda, 1960, former football player
- Al Westover, 1976, former basketball player in the Australian National Basketball League
- Craig Whelihan, 1995, former NFL, XFL and AFL quarterback
- Roy Williams, 1962, former NFL defensive tackle

=== Others ===
- S. G. Browne, 1989, author of dark comedy and social satire
- Matt de la Peña, 1996, Newbery Medal-winning author, writer of children's books
- Sharon Ito, 1982, Japanese-American newscaster
- George Knapp, 1977, investigative journalist
- Susanne Mentzer, 1976, operatic mezzo-soprano
- Peter Morales, 1967, president of the Unitarian Universalist Association, 2009
- Olive Oatman, 1857, Indian captive and lecturer
- Steven D. Strauss, author, columnist, and lawyer

== Notable coaches ==
- Bill Anttila, the school's all-time winningest water polo coach, member of United States Water Polo Hall of Fame, charter member of the California Community College Water Polo Hall of Fame, member of Springfield College (MA) Hall of Fame
- Jon Gruden, former Pacific assistant football coach, later served as head coach of the NFL's Oakland Raiders, Tampa Bay Buccaneers and Las Vegas Raiders
- Terry Liskevych, former 3-time Olympic women's volleyball head coach; Pacific's head coach 1977–84
- Buddy Ryan, former Pacific assistant football coach, former NFL head coach of the Philadelphia Eagles and Arizona Cardinals
- Ed Sprague Jr., former Major League Baseball all-star; head baseball coach, 2004–2015
- Amos Alonzo Stagg, "The Grand Old Man of Football", head football coach at Pacific 1933–46
- Damon Stoudamire, former Pacific head men's basketball coach, 2016–2021, 13-year NBA player and 1996 NBA Rookie of the Year
- Bob Thomason, 1971, 5-time Big West Coach of the Year and school's all-time winningest men's basketball coach; Pacific's head coach 1988–2013

== Notable staff/faculty ==
- Marisa Kelly, president of Suffolk University in Boston, Massachusetts
- Anthony Kennedy, associate justice of the Supreme Court of the United States, teaches international and American law at the University of Salzburg for the McGeorge School of Law international program
- Samuel Stephens Kistler, 1922, inventor of Aerogel, faculty member 1923–1930
- Heather Knight, former president of Pacific Union College
