= Murray Jones (rugby union) =

New Zealand rugby union player

- Born: Murray Gordon Jones; 26 October 1942 Warkworth, New Zealand
- Died: 12 February 1975 (aged 32) Auckland Harbour, New Zealand
- Height: 1.85 m (6 ft 1 in)
- Weight: 95 kg (209 lb)
- School: Warkworth District High School

Rugby union career
- Position: Prop
Provincial / State sides
Years	Team	Apps	(Points)
1964–69	Auckland	56	
1970–74	North Auckland	53	
International career
Years	Team	Apps	(Points)
1973	New Zealand	1	(0)

Murray Gordon Jones (26 October 1942 – 12 February 1975) was a New Zealand rugby union player. A prop, Jones represented Auckland and North Auckland at a provincial level, and was a member of the New Zealand national side, the All Blacks, in 1973. He played five matches for the All Blacks including one test against the touring England side in 1973.

Jones drowned in Auckland Harbour while attempting to rescue his son following a yachting accident. He was buried at North Shore Memorial Park.
