= Anne Walton =

Canadian swimmer

Personal information
- Full name: Anne Walton -Grape
- Nationality: Canadian
- Born: 28 December 1951 Sidmouth, Devon, England
- Died: 23 November 2014 (aged 62) Winnipeg, Manitoba
- Occupation: Early Childhood educator
- Height: 172 cm (5 ft 8 in)
- Weight: 66 kg (146 lb)

Sport
- Sport: Swimming
- Strokes: backstroke
- Club: Winnipeg YMCA; Cardinal Swim Club, (Winnipeg)
- College team: Guelph University
- Coach: Howard Firby (Cardinal SC)

Anne Walton (born 28 December 1951), also known by her married name Anne Walton Grape was a Canadian former backstroke swimmer, who competed for the University of Guelph and represented Canada in three events at the 1968 Summer Olympics. She later worked in early childhood education.

Anne Walton was born 28 December 1951 in Sidmouth, Devon England to Barbara and Dr. Richard J. Walton. At the age of 5, she moved to Winnipeg, Manitoba with her family and later learned to swim at Winnipeg's historic Sherbrook Pool. Built in March, 1931, Sherbrook Pool on Sherbrook Street was one of the largest pools in Western Canada, the city's first Olympic sized pool, and the site of many swimming competitions. At 12 in early August, 1964, she swam for the Winnipeg YWCA, placing first in the 100-yard freestyle with a time of 1:08.8 at the Saskatchewan Swimming Championships where she set an open record of 1:15.7 in the 100-yard backstroke. Showing stroke diversity, she also won the 50-yard butterfly by a time of 34.7 at the Saskatchewan Championship, and would later continue to compete in butterfly in a few college meets.

== Cardinal Swim Club ==
She set a Canadian age-group record at 13 in the 100-yard backstroke at the Manitoba Open Swimming Championships in Winnipeg in May, 1965 with a time of 1:15.9. By 1967 she was trained and mentored by Hall of Fame Coach Howard Firby at Winnipeg's Cardinal Swim Club. Firby, trained as a professional illustrator, had made a lengthy study of both anatomy and hydrodynamics, and was particularly skilled at teaching stroke technique, including backstroke and butterfly. Anne's father R.J. Walton was President of the Cardinal Club, whose swimmers trained at the newly built Olympic sized Pan-Am Pool built for the 1967 Pan-American Games. Anne roomed for a time with swimming star Elaine Tanner who came to the Cardinal Club in Winnipeg from Vancouver to be coached by Firby.

== 1968 Mexico City Olympics ==
=== Olympic trials and team training ===
To qualify for the 1968 Canadian Olympic Team, Walton swam a 1:10.6 for the 100 meter backstroke in the Canadian National Championships, finishing second to future B.C. Hall of Fame swimmer Elaine Tanner. To adjust to the altitude of the Mexico City Olympics, the Canadian team spent three weeks in September, 1968 training at the Banf Springs Hotel pool, a 105 foot facility in Banf's National Park area, 4000 feet above sea level. The American team had trained in Colorado Springs for similar altitude training. Notably Mexico City has an elevation of 7,000 feet, well above 4,000 feet. The altitude training in Banf caused some illness among Canada's team in the form of stomach cramps. Among those diagnosed with cramps were Anne Walton and Elaine Tanner, who were likely prospects for the Women's 4x100 meter medley. Problems with altitude training in the forms of stomach cramps had also been reported by the American swimming team that year. A somewhat lackluster Olympic year for the Canadian team might have been explained by the rigors of altitude training and the problems of a few team members who were not selective enough in which foods they consumed while in Mexico City.

=== 1968 Olympic events ===
In the 1968 Summer Olympics in mid-October, Walton competed in the Women's 100 metres backstroke, finishing in a tie for 26th place with a time of 1:13.0, and placed 20th in the 200 metres women's backstroke with a time of 2:39.4. The Canadian women's team was coached by of Ted Thomas of Calgary.

Her Canadian women's 4x100 metres Medley Relay team placed 10th overall with a combined time of 4:43.1. Walton swam the medley relay with the team of Elaine Tanner who swam the backstroke leg, Jeanne Warren who swam the butterfly leg, and Marion Lay who swam the freestyle anchor leg. Walton swam her breaststroke leg in a time of 1:25.1. Some discussion existed as to why Sylvia Dockerill, who had recorded a 100-meter breaststroke time that year of 1:20 or backstroker Anne Smith were not selected by the Canadian Olympic Association (COA) to travel to Mexico to swim for the Canadian Women' team, though they were available as alternates. The COA noted that Dockerill and Smith had not recorded the qualifying standard for the 100 breaststroke at the trials in Winnipeg, although the decision as which swimmers to send had been appealed. According to journalists, Walton as a backstroke swimmer may have recorded the fastest breaststroke of the existing Canadian women's team, but the team should have had greater depth at breaststroke. Responsibility was placed with the COA, not the relay swimmers themselves.

At the Ontario Senior Swimming Championships in Entobicoke on February 7–8, 1970, Walton swam a winning time of 2:38.2 for the 200 meter backstroke and swam a winning time of 1:12.2 for the 100 meter backstroke.

=== University of Guelph ===
She attended the University of Guelph from 1971-1974, and competed for the Guelph Gryphons swimming team, where she graduated with a B.A. in Early Childhood Education 1974. She was an OWIAA Conference Champion, a Canadian Interscholastic Athletic Union (CIAU) Champion in National competition in the 1971-72 season, and was voted a Most Valuable Player at the 1971-72 CIAU Championships. At the McMaster University Invitational Meet on November 18, 1972, Walton won her signature events, the 100 and 200 yard backstroke, and 50-yard butterfly, and swam on the winning 400-yard medley relay team.

She was married to James Grape, and had three children.

She served as a teacher at Gretta Brown Day Nursery, and at Red River College in their Early Childhood Education program.

After receiving care at Winnipeg's St. Boniface Hospital, Anne Walton Grape died in Winnipeg after a lengthy battle with cancer on 23 November 2014.

=== Honors ===
She was inducted into the University of Guelph Hall of Fame in 1984.
