= Waimea Plains (Tasman) =

Locality in Tasman District, New Zealand

- Locality
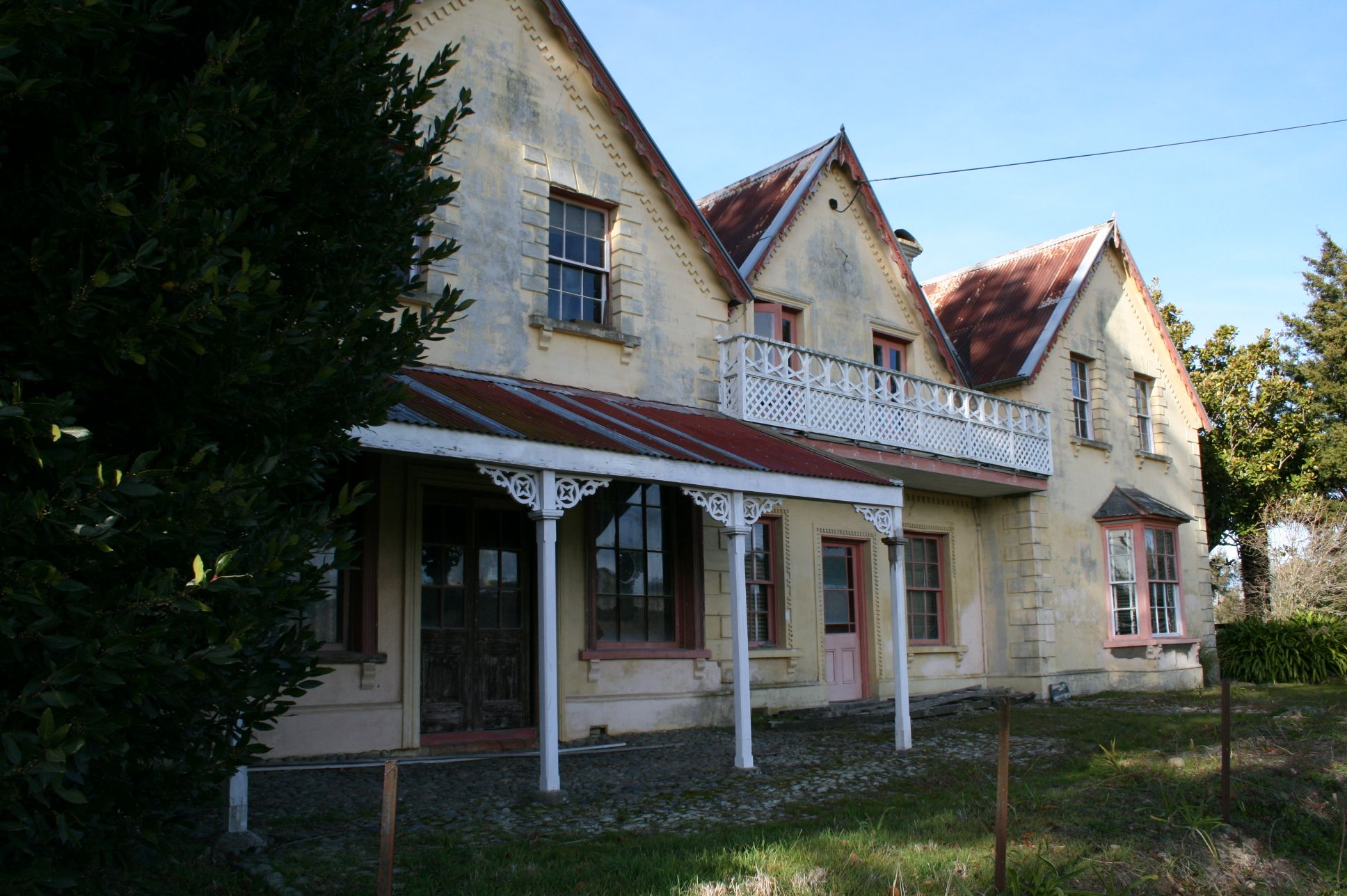
- The Gables on Waimea West Road
- Interactive map of Waimea Plains
- Coordinates: 41°20′S 173°08′E
- Country: New Zealand
- Territorial authority: Tasman
- Ward: Moutere-Waimea Ward
- Electorates: West Coast-Tasman; Te Tai Tonga (Māori)

Government
  - Territorial Authority: Tasman District Council
  - Mayor of Tasman: Tim King
  - West Coast-Tasman MP: Maureen Pugh
  - Te Tai Tonga MP: Tākuta Ferris

Area
  - Total: 60.07 km^{2} (23.19 sq mi)

Population (June 2025)
  - Total: 1,090
  - Density: 18.1/km^{2} (47.0/sq mi)
- Time zone: UTC+12 (NZST)
  - Summer (DST): UTC+13 (NZDT)
- Area code: 03

The Waimea Plains is a small but fertile area of low-lying land southwest of the port city of Nelson, situated on Tasman Bay / Te Tai-o-Aorere in the South Island of New Zealand. It is irrigated by the Waimea River from the Waimea Inlet in the north and bounded by the town of Brightwater in the south. The fertile soil promotes the growth of kiwifruit, apples and vineyards.

The temperate climate allows for the growth of crops such as hops, apples and grapes.

== Demographics ==
The Waimea West statistical area covers the part of the Waimea Plains west of the Waimea River, with an area of 60.07 km^{2} (23.19 sq mi). It had an estimated population of 1,090 as of June 2025, with a population density of 18.1 people per km^{2}. Demographics of the Waimea Plains east of the river are covered at Appleby

Historical population
Year	Pop.	±% p.a.
2006	1,038	—
2013	1,113	+1.00%
2018	1,140	+0.48%
2023	1,107	−0.59%
The 2006 population is for a smaller area of 59.17 km^{2}. Source:

Waimea West had a population of 1,107 in the 2023 New Zealand census, a decrease of 33 people (−2.9%) since the 2018 census, and a decrease of 6 people (−0.5%) since the 2013 census. There were 567 males, 534 females, and 3 people of other genders in 411 dwellings. 1.6% of people identified as LGBTIQ+. The median age was 50.3 years (compared with 38.1 years nationally). There were 174 people (15.7%) aged under 15 years, 168 (15.2%) aged 15 to 29, 549 (49.6%) aged 30 to 64, and 216 (19.5%) aged 65 or older.

People could identify as more than one ethnicity. The results were 94.9% European (Pākehā); 6.8% Māori; 1.6% Pasifika; 1.1% Asian; 0.5% Middle Eastern, Latin American and African New Zealanders (MELAA); and 1.6% other, which includes people giving their ethnicity as "New Zealander". English was spoken by 98.1%, Māori by 1.6%, and other languages by 6.8%. No language could be spoken by 1.4% (e.g. too young to talk). New Zealand Sign Language was known by 0.8%. The percentage of people born overseas was 16.3, compared with 28.8% nationally.

Religious affiliations were 29.5% Christian, 0.3% Māori religious beliefs, 0.8% Buddhist, 0.5% New Age, and 1.4% other religions. People who answered that they had no religion were 59.3%, and 8.1% of people did not answer the census question.

Of those at least 15 years old, 234 (25.1%) people had a bachelor's or higher degree, 543 (58.2%) had a post-high school certificate or diploma, and 159 (17.0%) people exclusively held high school qualifications. The median income was $43,100, compared with $41,500 nationally. 114 people (12.2%) earned over $100,000 compared to 12.1% nationally. The employment status of those at least 15 was 498 (53.4%) full-time, 192 (20.6%) part-time, and 12 (1.3%) unemployed.
