= Ivor Stirling =

NZ international rugby league footballer (1916-1979)

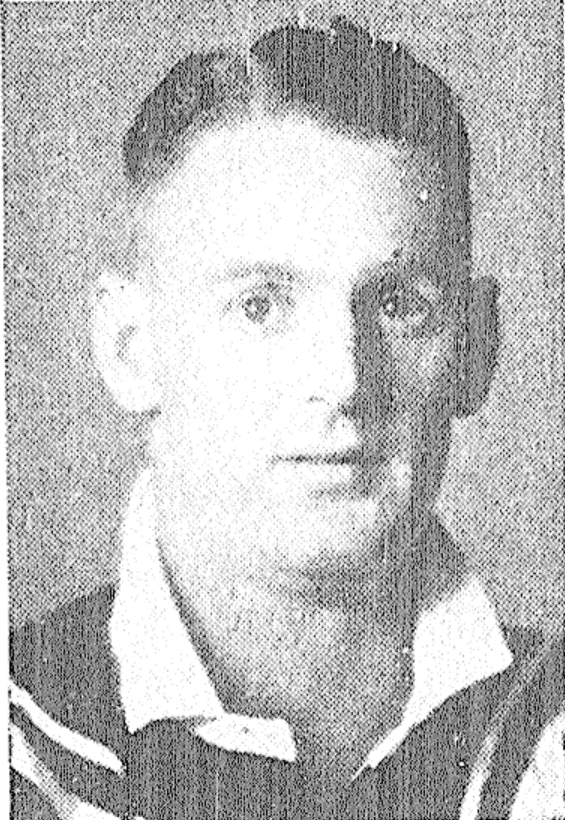

Personal information
- Full name: Ivor Gerald Stirling
- Born: 19 February 1916 New Zealand
- Died: 21 September 1979 (aged 63)

Playing information
Club
| Years | Team | Pld | T | G | FG | P |
|---|---|---|---|---|---|---|
| 1937–1939 | North Shore Albions | 48 | 8 | 0 | 0 | 24 |
Representative
| Years | Team | Pld | T | G | FG | P |
| 1939 | Auckland Pakehā | 1 | 0 | 0 | 0 | 0 |
| 1939 | New Zealand |
- Relatives: Glenda Stirling (daughter); Ken Stirling (son); Lorrie Hunter (father-in-law)

Ivor Gerald Stirling (19 February 1916 – 21 September 1979) was a New Zealand rugby league footballer who represented New Zealand.

== Playing career ==
Stirling represented Auckland and was named in the New Zealand national rugby league team.

Stirling was part of the 1939 New Zealand tour that was cancelled due to World War II.

During the War, Stirling joined the New Zealand Army and played rugby union during the 1940 season.

After World War Two, Stirling represented the North Shore Albions in the Auckland Rugby League competition.

== Personal life ==
Stirling's son, Ken, also represented New Zealand in rugby league while his daughter, Glenda, represented New Zealand in swimming at the 1968 Summer Olympics.
