= Ken Stirling =

New Zealand international rugby league footballer, coach and administrator

Personal information
- Full name: Kenneth Lorrie Stirling
- Born: 9 December 1949 (age 76) New Zealand
- Weight: 78 kg (12 st 4 lb; 172 lb)

Playing information
- Position: Halfback
Club
Years	Team	Pld	T	G	FG	P
	Ellerslie
Representative
Years	Team	Pld	T	G	FG	P
	Auckland
1971–78	New Zealand	22	4	0	0	12

Coaching information
Club
Years	Team	Gms	W	D	L	W%
	Ellerslie
- Father: Ivor Stirling
- Relatives: Glenda Stirling (sister)

Kenneth Lorrie Stirling is a New Zealand former rugby league footballer, coach and administrator who represented New Zealand in the 1975 World Championship.

== Playing career ==
Stirling played for the Ellerslie club in the Auckland Rugby League and in 1971 won the Rothville Trophy as player of the year and the Bert Humphries Memorial as most improved back. He made his debut for the New Zealand National Rugby League Team that same year and went on to play in 22 Test matches, scoring four tries. Stirling would have played in more Test matches if it was not for an injury, he missed the 1972 World Cup and retired from international football in 1976 before returning in 1978. In total, he played in 43 matches for the Kiwis.

Stirling was an Auckland representative and won the New Zealand Rugby League Player of the Year award in 1974.

Stirling was appointed as the Kiwis captain in 1974 and continued in the role during the 1975 World Championship and in 1978.

== Later years ==
After retirement, Stirling coached Ellerslie. In 1982, Stirling helped found the Hibiscus Coast Raiders club and served on their foundation committee.

In 1988, Stirling was elected onto the New Zealand Rugby League board, serving a four-year term. He later served another four-year term and was also the convenor of selectors for the national side.

Stirling was inducted into the New Zealand Rugby League's Legends of League in 2007.

== Family ==
Stirling's father, Ivor, also represented New Zealand in a rugby league. His sister, Glenda, represented New Zealand in swimming at the 1968 Summer Olympics and he is related to New Zealand former cricket captain, Daniel Vettori.
