= María Corominas =

Spanish swimmer

Personal information
- Full name: María Paz Corominas Guerín
- Born: 2 June 1952 (age 74) Barcelona, Catalonia, Spain
- Height: 166 cm (5 ft 5 in)
- Weight: 56 kg (123 lb)

Sport
- Sport: Swimming
Medal record
Women's swimming
Representing Spain
Mediterranean Games
Gold medal – first place	1967 Tunis	100 m backstroke

María Paz Corominas Guerín (Note: In this Spanish name, the first or paternal surname is Corominas and the second or maternal family name is Guerín.) (Catalan: Mari Pau Coromines i Guerin, born 2 June 1952) is a Spanish former backstroke swimmer who competed in the 1968 Summer Olympics.
