= Yvette Hafner =

Austrian swimmer

Personal information
- Born: 23 December 1947 (age 78) Budapest, Hungary

Sport
- Sport: Swimming

Yvette Hafner (born 23 December 1947) is an Austrian former backstroke swimmer. She competed in two events at the 1968 Summer Olympics.
