= Anca Andreiu =

Romanian swimmer

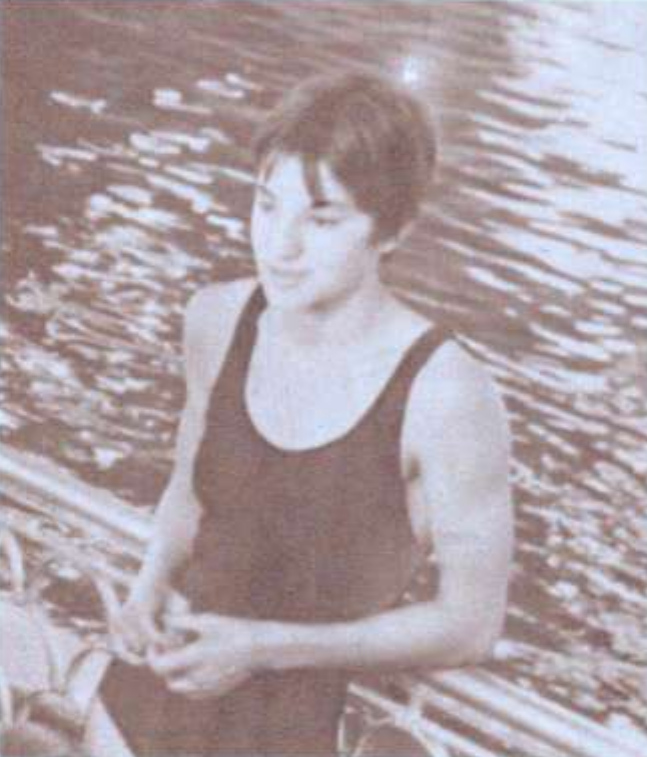
- Andrei in 1967

Personal information
- Born: 18 August 1951 (age 74) Reșița, Romania

Sport
- Sport: Swimming

Anca Andreiu (born 18 August 1951) is a Romanian former backstroke swimmer. She competed in two events at the 1968 Summer Olympics.
