= María Procopio =

Argentine swimmer

Personal information
- Born: 1 March 1951 (age 75) Avellaneda, Argentina

Sport
- Sport: Swimming

María Procopio (born 1 March 1951) is an Argentine former swimmer. She competed in two events at the 1968 Summer Olympics.
