= Patricia Sentous =

Argentine swimmer

Personal information
- Born: 19 March 1950 (age 76) Buenos Aires, Argentina

Sport
- Sport: Swimming

Patricia Sentous (born 19 March 1950) is an Argentine former swimmer. She competed in two events at the 1968 Summer Olympics.
