= Ulla Patrikka =

Finnish swimmer

Personal information
- Born: 10 April 1946 (age 80) Jyväskylä, Finland

Sport
- Sport: Swimming

Ulla Patrikka (born 10 April 1946) is a Finnish former backstroke swimmer. She competed in two events at the 1968 Summer Olympics.
