= Bénédicte Duprez =

French swimmer

Personal information
- Born: 8 August 1951 (age 74) Tourcoing, France

Sport
- Sport: Swimming
Medal record
Representing France
Summer Universiade
Bronze medal – third place	1973 Moscow	100m backstroke

Bénédicte Duprez (born 8 August 1951) is a French former backstroke swimmer. She competed in two events at the 1968 Summer Olympics.
