= Glenda Stirling =

New Zealand swimmer (born 1952)

Glenda Biddle
Personal information
- Birth name: Glenda Joy Stirling
- Born: 7 July 1952 (age 72); Auckland, New Zealand
- Height: 1.68 m (5 ft 6 in)
- Weight: 65 kg (143 lb)
- Spouse: Jack Edward Biddle
- Relative(s): Ivor Stirling (father); Ken Stirling (brother); Lorrie Hunter (grandfather)

Sport
- Country: New Zealand
- Sport: Swimming

Glenda Joy Stirling (married name Biddle, born 7 July 1952) is a former New Zealand swimmer who represented her country at the 1968 Summer Olympics and 1970 British Commonwealth Games.

== Early life and family ==
Stirling was born in Auckland on 7 July 1952. Her father was Ivor Gerald Stirling and her mother was Joyce Agnes Stirling (née Hunter), a daughter of politician Lorrie Hunter. She married Jack Edward Biddle, and the couple went on to have five children. Her brother, Ken, was a New Zealand rugby league international, as was her father.

== Swimming ==
Stirling competed in three events at the 1968 Summer Olympics, reaching the final and finishing eighth in the 100 m backstroke. She also competed in the 200 m backstroke and 4 × 100 m medlay relay, but did not progress beyond the heats. At the 1970 British Commonwealth Games in Edinburgh, she competed in the same three events, finishing fourth in both the 100 m backstroke and 4 × 100 m medlay relay, and sixth in the 200 m backstroke.
