= Francine Dauven =

Belgian swimmer

Personal information
- Born: 7 January 1949 (age 77) Liège, Belgium

Sport
- Sport: Swimming

Francine Dauven (born 7 January 1949) is a Belgian former backstroke swimmer. She competed in two events at the 1968 Summer Olympics.
