= Elaine Tanner =

Canadian swimmer

Elaine Tanner OC
Personal information
- Full name: Elaine Tanner-Watt
- Nickname: "Mighty Mouse"
- National team: Canada
- Born: February 22, 1951 (age 75) Vancouver, British Columbia, Canada
- Height: 1.60 m (5 ft 3 in)
- Weight: 61 kg (134 lb)

Sport
- Sport: Swimming
- Strokes: Backstroke, butterfly, freestyle
- Club: Canadian Dolphins; Pacific Dolphins
- Coach: Howard Firby (Canadian Dolphins)
Medal record
Women's swimming
Representing Canada
Olympic Games
| Silver medal – second place | 1968 Mexico City | 100 m backstroke |
| Silver medal – second place | 1968 Mexico City | 200 m backstroke |
| Bronze medal – third place | 1968 Mexico City | 4x100 m freestyle |
Pan American Games
| Gold medal – first place | 1967 Winnipeg | 100 m backstroke |
| Gold medal – first place | 1967 Winnipeg | 200 m backstroke |
| Silver medal – second place | 1967 Winnipeg | 100 m butterfly |
| Silver medal – second place | 1967 Winnipeg | 4×100 m freestyle relay |
| Silver medal – second place | 1967 Winnipeg | 4×100 m medley relay |
British Empire and Commonwealth Games
| Gold medal – first place | 1966 Kingston | 110 yd butterfly |
| Gold medal – first place | 1966 Kingston | 220 yd butterfly |
| Gold medal – first place | 1966 Kingston | 440 yd individual medley |
| Gold medal – first place | 1966 Kingston | 4×110 yd freestyle relay |
| Silver medal – second place | 1966 Kingston | 110 yd backstroke |
| Silver medal – second place | 1966 Kingston | 220 yd backstroke |
| Silver medal – second place | 1966 Kingston | 4×110 yd medley relay |

Elaine Tanner-Watt OC (born February 22, 1951) is a Canadian former competition swimmer. She is a triple Olympic medalist and former world record-holder in five events.

Tanner was born in Vancouver, British Columbia on February 22, 1951, to Ron and Edna Tanner. She learned to swim by five when the family moved to California. Returning to Vancouver at eight where she immediately joined the Vancouver's Canadian Dolphins Swimming Club, she competed and trained for Hall of Fame Coach Howard Firby. She credited Firby's knowledge of anatomy and kinetics with a rapid development in her speed, largely a result of Firby's skills in refining her stroke technique. His knowledge of swimming and skilled, and demanding training helped her refine her natural strength and power to become a champion.

Nicknamed "Mighty Mouse" partly because of her small stature (standing barely five feet tall) and partly due to her competitive drive, Tanner had a large impact on Canadian swimming and is considered one of the top performers in the sport.

== International competition ==
During the 1966 Commonwealth Games in Kingston, Jamaica, Tanner won four gold medals and three silvers, becoming the first woman to ever win four golds at a Commonwealth Games and the first person to get seven medals in those games. She won the Lou Marsh Trophy, recognizing her as Canada's best athlete in 1966 — the youngest person to ever receive the award — and was also selected as the country's top athlete overall. The following year at the 1967 Pan American Games in Winnipeg, Tanner won two gold and three silver medals, breaking two world records in the process.

She won the ASA National British Championships over 110 yards butterfly in 1965.

== 1968 Olympics ==
Tanner arrived at the 1968 Summer Olympics in Mexico City as a heavy medal favorite. She won three Olympic medals in Mexico City, including two individual silver medals and one relay bronze. After the Olympics, Tanner retired from competition at 18 years.

== Awards and accolades ==
In 1969, she was made an Officer of the Order of Canada and was inducted into Canada's Sports Hall of Fame in 1971. The Elaine Tanner Award has been presented to Canada's top junior female athlete since 1972.

== Personal life ==
Following the games, Tanner fell into a depression that lasted decades, developed a serious eating disorder, suffered anxiety attacks and had her first marriage end after 9 years in 1980, with two children that wound up going to the custody of the father in Prince George as Tanner remained in Vancouver. Roaming around Canada doing odd jobs and eventually having a failed second marriage that ended in 1987, by 1988 she was living off her car, jobless, and feeling suicidal, but eventually found her footing again after meeting former lifeguard John Watt. She married him five years later, and lives with him in White Rock, British Columbia. They have a charity organization, Team Underdog.

In 1969-70, she briefly attended the University of Alberta, and in 1970 enrolled at the University of Calgary. In 1986, she graduated Simon Fraser University in greater Vancouver with a degree in kinesiology and began a career in holistic health. As of 2013, she practiced in Oakville, Ontario.

== Bibliography ==
- Monkey Guy And The Cosmic Fairy (2015) - children's book
- Quest Beyond Gold (TBD) - autobiography

== See also ==
- List of members of the International Swimming Hall of Fame
- List of Olympic medalists in swimming (women)
- World record progression 100 metres backstroke
- World record progression 200 metres backstroke
