= Zdenka Gašparac =

Croatian swimmer

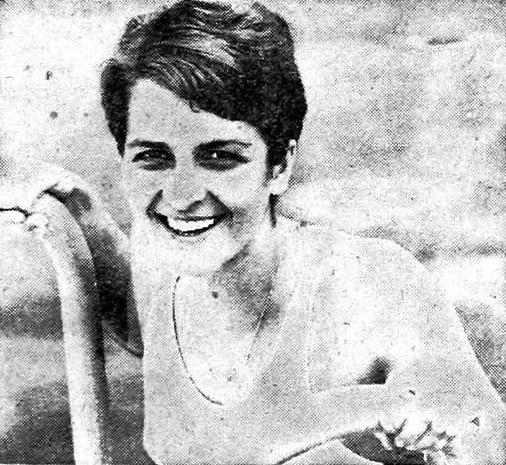
- Zdenka Gašparac in 1968

Personal information
- Born: 5 July 1949 (age 77) Zadar, Yugoslavia

Sport
- Sport: Swimming

Zdenka Gašparac (born 5 July 1949) is a Croatian former swimmer. She competed at the 1968 Summer Olympics and the 1972 Summer Olympics for Yugoslavia.
