= Sylvie Canet =

French swimmer

Personal information
- Born: 26 August 1953 (age 72) Casablanca, Morocco

Sport
- Sport: Swimming

Sylvie Canet (born 26 August 1953) is a French former backstroke swimmer. She competed in two events at the 1968 Summer Olympics.
